= Game Over (2003 film) =

- DVD cover
- Written by: Keith Shaw
- Directed by: Jason Bourque
- Starring: Yasmine Bleeth; Walter Koenig; Woody Jeffreys; Dominika Wolski; Vincent Schiavelli
- Music by: Mike Thomas
- Original language: English

Production
- Producer: Maryvonne Micale
- Running time: 90 minutes

Original release
- Release: June 23, 2003

Game Over is a 2003 television film starring Yasmine Bleeth, Walter Koenig, Woody Jeffreys and Dominika Wolski. It incorporates footage originally shot for several video games released by Digital Pictures.

== Plot ==
When a supercomputer is linked to a video game network, the computer programmer who designed the game must enter the virtual reality world of his fantasies and defeat the computer before it causes worldwide chaos.

== Cast ==
- Doug Abrahams – Mr. Brinkman
- Jeremiah Birkett – Winston
- Yasmine Bleeth – Jo
- Michael Buffer – boxing announcer
- Mike Ditka – football coach
- Brian Dobson – DJ
- Andy Hirsch – Codec
- Woody Jeffreys – Steve Hunter
- Erin Karpluk – Zoey
- Walter Koenig – Drexel's body
- Dick Miller – boxing cornerman
- France Perras – Synthi
- Manny Petruzzeli – Drexel's voice
- Alvin Sanders – Professor Roswell
- Vincent Schiavelli – Dr. Hellman
- Marek Wiedman – Commander
- Dominika Wolski – Elaine Barker
- Officer Pinkerton – Craig McNair

== Production ==
Game Over (originally titled Maximum Surge Movie) was made by combining 65 minutes of original footage with 25 minutes of footage originally filmed for full motion video sequences in five different Digital Pictures games: Maximum Surge (unreleased), Corpse Killer, Prize Fighter, Supreme Warrior, and Quarterback Attack with Mike Ditka. The storyline ties all these games together as being part of a game that the main character, Steve Hunter (played by Jeffreys), has to play in order to save the world. The villain of Maximum Surge, Drexel, is adapted to the film as a computer system created by the protagonist, with the in-game character Drexel being its avatar in virtual reality, and the dialogue of Walter Koenig portraying said avatar is dubbed over with a voice actor who also voices Drexel in the real world.

The real stars of the movie (Woody Jeffreys and Dominika Wolski) are given second billing in favor of the famous personalities who only appear in the game sequences (Koenig, Bleeth, Schiavelli). Since the game footage was taken several years before the movie was filmed, the footage quality is poorer than the rest of the film.
