= Kids on Site =

1994 video game

- North American Sega CD box art
- Developer: Digital Pictures
- Publisher: Digital Pictures
- Director: Heidi Holman
- Programmer: Richard Levine
- Platforms: Sega CD, MS-DOS, Macintosh, PlayStation 4, Windows
- Release: NA: November 1994; PAL: 1994; PS4, Windows: WW: July 28, 2022
- Genre: FMV
- Mode: Single-player

Kids on Site is a first-person simulation video game using full-motion video for its primary gameplay. It was produced for the Sega CD and ported to MS-DOS compatible operating systems and Mac. A 32X version was planned but never released. Versions for PlayStation 4 and Windows via Steam were re-released by Limited Run Games, Screaming Villains and Flash Film Works on June 14, 2022.

== Gameplay ==
This was a construction game for kids, where they watched videos and then got to "operate" heavy machinery on a construction site. This includes a steamroller, a wrecking ball, an excavator and a bulldozer.

== Development ==
The project was produced by Digital Pictures, directed by Heidi Holman and starred Larry Grennan, Scott McClain and Robin Joss. It was programmed by Richard Levine from a concept by Kevin Welsh.

== Reception ==
Kids on Site was awarded the "1995 Parents Choice Approval Award" and CD-ROM Magazine said it "captured all of the fun of playing with heavy machinery with the added advantage that your kids... won't come home full of dirt."
