= Double Switch (video game) =

1993 video game

- Double Switch PC cover
- Developer: Digital Pictures
- Publishers: Sega: Sega (Sega CD); Digital Pictures (Saturn, Windows, Mac OS); Flash Film Works (mobile); Screaming Villains (PS4, Vita, PC, Switch)
- Director: Mary Lambert
- Producers: James Riley; Paul Levin; Dena Maheras
- Designers: James Riley; Ken Soohoo
- Programmer: Ken Soohoo
- Writers: Flint Dille; James Riley; Christian Williams
- Composer: Thomas Dolby
- Platforms: Sega CD: Saturn; Microsoft Windows; Mac OS; iOS; Android; PlayStation 4; Nintendo Switch
- Release: Sega CD: NA: 1993; EU: February 1994; JP: March 24, 1995; Saturn: NA: 1995; Windows & Mac OS: NA: 1995; Mobile: WW: 2016; PlayStation 4, Windows (Steam): WW: December 11, 2018; Nintendo Switch: WW: October 5, 2019
- Genres: Adventure, interactive movie
- Mode: Single-player

Double Switch is an adventure interactive movie video game originally released for Sega CD, Sega Saturn and Microsoft Windows and later remastered for mobile, Steam, PlayStation 4 and Nintendo Switch. The game was produced by Digital Pictures and has a similar "trap-em-up" format to Space Panic, Heiankyo Alien, and Digital Pictures's earlier game, Night Trap. Apart from the HUD, the graphics consist of live action full motion video clips starring Corey Haim.

== Cast ==
- Corey Haim as Eddie
- Deborah Harry as Elizabeth
- Camille Cooper as Alex
- R. Lee Ermey as Lyle the Handyman
- Irwin Keyes as Brutus
- David Packer as Jeff
- Wendy Gazelle as Phoebe
- Kimberly Oja as Laura
- Taylor Negron as Slick Sammy

== Storyline ==
The game takes place in an apartment complex called the Edward Arms, which was built by the famous industrialist Lionel Atwater Edward III at the turn of the 20th Century. Built following an archaeological expedition to the Valley of the Kings, the building has an ancient Egypt theme and is rumored to hide a valuable statue of Isix (named after the precursor to Digital Pictures) stolen by Edward during his expedition. The player character, an anonymous, silent protagonist, is contacted via video call by the current owner of the Edward Arms, a young man named Eddie. Eddie says that he has equipped the building with cameras and traps to protect the tenants from the local criminal element, but one of the tenants has locked him in the basement. He gives the player character control of the cameras and traps and directs him to protect the tenants, trap the handyman Lyle whenever possible, and find the security codes to get him out.

After the player character acquires all the security codes, Eddie confides in him that one of the tenants is a killer. When he emerges from his basement prison, Eddie runs into Lyle and Elizabeth, the building's manager. Eddie and Lyle's argument reveals that Eddie is mentally unhinged, that Lyle and Elizabeth are his parents, and that Lyle locked him in the basement to keep him from doing harm to himself or others.

Each tenant has their own plot line that overlaps into the main plot. Alex, a journalist fresh out of college, enthusiastically investigates the many dangerous goings-on. Laura, an aspiring architect, and Phoebe, an archaeology student, share a room and have acquired a unique Egyptian statue. Another room is occupied by Scream, a hard rock band in search of a record deal. Brutus is an aging mobster that had just been released from prison and whose father worked on the construction of the Edward Arms. His father told him of gold concealed in the building, and Brutus wants to find it so he can pay off a debt to a dangerous mob boss. Elizabeth is trying to rekindle her relationship with Lyle. Though Lyle is held back by fears that any children they have will turn out like Eddie, he ultimately yields to her seductions.

Members of a secret society infiltrate the Edward Arms and go after Phoebe and Jeff as soon as they spot them with the statue. They escape and Jeff hides the statue in his room just before an A&R man arrives to audition Scream. One of the secret society attacks Jeff during the audition, but the player character uses a trap to save him and the A&R man decides to give Scream the label's fullest support. Meanwhile, Lyle goes around the building showing the player character dangerous traps that Eddie either did not know about or chose not to share with him. Lyle rewires these traps to give the player character control so that he can stop Eddie.

The building's killer appears dressed as a mummy. He herds the tenants into reach of the traps and tries to spring the traps using a remote control. The player character saves the tenants, and as the mummy is locked into a chair trap, Alex and Phoebe take the remote control away and unmask the mummy as Eddie. Enraged, Eddie vows to kill everyone in the building.

Alex and Phoebe petition Elizabeth for help, but Elizabeth is in denial of Eddie's problems. Angered by the girls' accusations, she locks the Edward Arms's entrance, trapping the tenants inside. Aided by the player character's trapping Eddie, the girls reunite with Laura and Jeff. Jeff suggests that Brutus likely has a gun that they can use to protect themselves. They find Brutus in his room, where Eddie attacks them, but is again trapped by the player character and returned to his basement prison. Elizabeth takes the statue from the girls and explains that Eddie had figured out that the statue is actually a key which transforms the entire Edward Arms into a giant treasury. The tenants stare in unified awe at the riches on display. Afterwards, someone takes the statue out of the lock to the treasury, resealing it.

== Gameplay ==
The objective of the game is to protect the tenants of the Edward Arms. The player character never actually enters the building, and must protect the tenants using the surveillance cameras, sensors, and traps installed in eight of the rooms. Using the cameras, the player may view any of the rooms, but can only view one room at a time, as with Night Trap. However, unlike Night Trap, at all times a mini map shows the player whether tenants, intruders, or both are present in each room, and an alarm sounds when an intruder enters any room. In addition, many of the intruders' appearances occur at random. Success in the game thus depends on quickly and effectively responding to situations rather than on determining when and where enemies appear.

When a tenant or intruder approaches a trap, the player may trap them by arming and then activating the trap. Trapping a tenant sometimes has no real consequences, but often results in a game over. If the player does not trap a solid majority of intruders as they appear, the game ends. Also, while most intruders do no particular harm when they appear, the player must trap any enemies who try to shut off the building's power, disconnect the phone lines, or attack the tenants. If an enemy succeeds in any one of those three things, the game immediately ends.

In addition to these objectives, each of the game's three levels (referred to in the manual as "acts") has its own special objective. In the first level the player must view the security codes needed to free Eddie from the basement. In level two the player must gain access to new hidden alcove traps. Level 3 includes a boss who the player must trap six times. If the player misses any opportunity to trap the boss, the boss will attack one or more of the tenants, resulting in a game over.

== Development ==
The Windows, Sega Saturn, and Mac editions were released later with enhanced video quality and Eddie's references to the Sega Genesis controller removed, though a TV in the game shows a screenshot from the Sega CD version no matter what version is being played.

== Reception ==
Reception

Review scores
Publication	Score
Electronic Gaming Monthly	6/10 (SCD)
Next Generation	2/5 (SAT)
Power Unlimited	78% (SCD)

Electronic Gaming Monthly gave the Sega CD version a 6 out of 10, describing it as "like Night Trap, [but] a little more involving". Manny LaMancha of GamePro praised the full-motion video quality and Thomas Dolby's music for the game, and said that "Double Switch is good enough that it'll sit in your CD tray until you're done – and you'll be glad you stuck it through the end."

Reviewing the Saturn version, a Next Generation critic felt that Double Switch holds up fairly well as a movie, with high production values, decent acting, and "top-notch" sets, but not as a game. He particularly noted the awkward interface and the repetitiveness of having to rewatch the same video segments over and over while using trial and error to figure out the correct course of actions. He also said that the poor video quality would have been acceptable on the Sega CD, but not on the Saturn. While Electronic Gaming Monthly never published an official review of the Saturn version, their preview based on a 90% complete beta was written in the manner of a review. They agreed that the graphics, while an improvement over the Sega CD version, are not up to Saturn standards, and also criticized the "highly confusing" gameplay. They concluded, "Players who are expecting a revamped version of Night Trap are sadly mistaken. This title boasts nothing more than a fallen star thrown in with other B-actors that have as much of a future as this title."

== Re-release ==
After Digital Pictures' bankruptcy, the games were purchased by a consortium that included visual effects company Flash Film Works. In December 2016, Double Switch was remastered from the original source video and released as an app for Google Play and iTunes. Additionally, in June 2018 it was announced that William Mesa and Flash Film Works had partnered with Screaming Villains and Limited Run Games to release the game on PlayStation 4 and Nintendo Switch as Double Switch: 25th Anniversary Edition.
