= Sewer Shark =

1992 video game

- North American Sega CD box art
- Developer: Digital Pictures
- Publishers: Sony Imagesoft; Hasbro (3DO)
- Director: John Dykstra
- Producers: JoAnne Michels-Bennett; Amanda Lathroum
- Designers: Kenneth Melville; Charlie Kellner
- Programmer: Charlie Kellner
- Writer: Kenneth Melville
- Composers: Tom Ferguson; Jay Ferguson
- Platforms: Sega CD, 3DO
- Release: Sega CD: NA: November 1992; PAL: June 1993; 3DO: NA: 1994
- Genres: Interactive movie, rail shooter
- Mode: Single-player

Sewer Shark is a 1992 interactive movie rail shooter video game developed by Digital Pictures and published by Sony Imagesoft for the Sega CD. It is one of the first games for a home console to use full-motion video for its primary gameplay. It was later ported to the 3DO in 1994.

The game was originally produced alongside Night Trap for release on the Control-Vision video game system, which was designed to use VHS tapes as its medium. However, Hasbro cancelled the Control-Vision in 1989, and Digital Pictures subsequently ported the game to the Sega CD add-on. Sewer Shark was one of the first titles for the Sega CD and became one of its best-selling games, leading Sega to eventually bundle it with Sega CD units. Total sales were reportedly over 750,000 copies. Sewer Shark received generally positive reviews upon release, with critics praising the use of FMV in the gameplay.

== Plot ==
Sewer Shark takes place in a post-apocalyptic future where environmental destruction has forced most of humanity to live underground. The player takes on the role of a rookie pilot in a band of "sewer jockeys", whose job is to exterminate dangerous mutated creatures to keep a vast network of sewers clean for "Solar City", an island paradise from which the evil Commissioner Stenchler (Robert Costanzo) gives his orders and critiques. The player's copilot, Ghost (David Underwood), evaluates the player's performance throughout the game, while a small robot named Catfish (voiced by Robert Weaver) scouts ahead and gives directions. The player is later assisted by Falco (Kari G. Peyton), a female jockey who believes that there is a hidden route to the surface. Falco is later captured by Stenchler, who threatens to mutate her into one of his mindless minions. This plot is thwarted when Ghost and the player reach Solar City.

== Gameplay ==
Sega CD screenshot

The objective of Sewer Shark is to travel all the way from the home base to Solar City without crashing or running out of energy, and while maintaining a satisfactory level of performance as judged by Ghost and Commissioner Stenchler. As in other rail shooters, the ship mostly flies itself, leaving the player to shoot ratigators (mutant crosses between rats and alligators), bats, giant scorpions and mechanical moles. Along the way, Catfish gives the player directions. If the player takes a wrong turn or misses a turn, they eventually hit a dead end and crash, ending the game. Later in the game, Catfish is replaced by a "crazy lookin' thing", which visually guides the player through the sewers.

The ship has a limited amount of energy, which depletes slowly during flight and while firing. Scorpions also rob the ship of energy if the player fails to shoot them down. This energy can be partially replenished at recharge stations. In later areas, the ship encounters occasional pockets of hydrogen that the player must have Catfish detonate to pass through safely.

At certain times, Ghost or Stenchler interrupt the player to give direct feedback. If the player is doing well, they are allowed to continue and are occasionally given a promotion in the form of a new call sign. A poor performance will eventually cause the game to end.

Sewer Shark is often referred to as an interactive movie due to its use of full motion video to convey the action, and the navigation aspect of the game is frequently compared to Dragon's Lair, since turns are gates that the player must pass through to continue playing.

== Production ==
The game originated on the cancelled VHS-based Control-Vision video game console. The video was split into four distinct tracks that were interleaved frame-by-frame, and the hardware would switch between tracks to, for example, show a turn being taken or ignored, along with the outcome of that decision (e.g. crashing into a wall). In converting the game to the Sega CD platform, Digital Pictures maintained this approach by having the console read all four tracks worth of data as a single continuous stream to minimize seek time on the CD. To work within the console's limitations, the developers wrote a custom video codec to highly compress the data streams so they could be read in realtime from the CD. This codec was also used in Night Trap and the Make My Video series, and an improved version was later used in Prize Fighter. A port was also planned for the Super NES CD-ROM before the system's cancellation.

Digital Pictures president Tom Zito has identified Rob Fulop, Kenneth Melville, and Charlie Kelner as the three main creative minds behind Sewer Shark. The video footage in Sewer Shark was directed by visual effects artist John Dykstra.

According to Zito, Sewer Shark cost $3 million to develop.

== Reception ==
Reception

Review scores
Publication	Score
AllGame	2/5 (SCD)
Electronic Gaming Monthly	7/10, 9/10, 6/10, 6/10 (SCD)
Mega Action	82% (SCD)
Mega Zone	68% (SCD)
Power Unlimited	78% (SCD)

Sewer Shark is one of the Sega CD's best-selling games, with more than 100,000 units sold prior to having been bundled with the system. Over 500,000 copies were bundled with the Sega CD, while non-bundled copies grossed about $18 million in retail sales. In the end the game sold more than 750,000 copies.

The game is on the Associated Press list of top ten video games from 1993. They called it "bizarre and wildly entertaining" and a must-have game for all Sega CD owners.

Entertainment Weekly wrote that "It is one of the first games to incorporate humans in live-action, full-motion video footage. And with the promise of movie-quality pictures, audiophile sound, and fast frames-per-second animation, CD-ROM figures to be the shape of games to come." Mega Action gave a review score of 82 out of 100, stating that "The graphics and stereo sound make this a must to your collection". Power Unlimited gave a score of 78%, writing: "Sewer Shark is another interactive movie that took advantage of the capabilities of the Sega CD. It was therefore one of the reasons that the device flopped. The visuals were of low quality and the game was boring and short. Good voices."
