= Ground Zero: Texas =

1993 video game

- European cover art
- Developer: Digital Pictures
- Publishers: Sony Imagesoft; Sega
- Director: Dwight H. Little
- Producer: Tom Zito
- Designers: Kenneth Melville; Amanda Lathroum; Mark D. Klein; Gene Kusmiak
- Programmer: Gene Kusmiak
- Writers: Alan B. McElroy (screenplay); Edward Neumeier (story); Joshua Stallings (story)
- Platforms: Sega CD, PlayStation 4, Windows
- Release: Sega CD: NA: November 1993; EU: February 18, 1994; PlayStation 4, Windows: WW: March 23, 2021
- Genres: Shooter, interactive movie
- Mode: Single-player

Ground Zero: Texas is a full motion video game, released for the Sega CD in November 1993. The game relies heavily on video footage, with which the player interacts. It contains 110 minutes of interactive footage from four different cameras. It was directed by Dwight H. Little, who is also known for the films Marked for Death and Halloween 4: The Return of Michael Myers.

== Plot ==
In 1995, aliens known as Reticulans attacked El Cadron, a small border town in Texas. The player has arrived to save the townspeople, who have been disappearing. The aliens have clever ways of disguising themselves as townspeople. The player's mission is to do away with the Reticulans, but they cannot be killed with regular guns. The player is armed with four BattleCams, with a stunning particle beam that stops the alien temporarily. The player must rid the world of the Reticulan menace before the entire area is destroyed by a nuclear bomb.

Four special operatives will help the player by providing clues to the Reticulan base. When a special operative is fighting with a Reticulan, the player has to shoot the enemy before they can abduct the special operative. After the enemy is disposed of, the special operative can look at its pendant. On each pendant is a number and a shape that corresponds to a special lock. Once the code is cracked, the vaulted door opens to reveal the Reticulans' weapons arsenal and a cold storage area.

After the base is secured, all of the player's BattleCams become reprogrammed with Reticulan weaponry. Upon learning of this development, the Reticulans deploy stormtroopers to destroy the town and its people. The Special Forces fight back as the areas of the town explode into debris.

In a desperate attempt to stop the Special Forces, the Reticulans abduct Reece, take him to their mothership, and prepare to take off. DiSalvo rigs a special BattleCam armed with a giant alien cannon. With a single well-placed shot, the mothership is obliterated, saving the town and Earth from the Reticulan army.

== Development ==
Ground Zero Texas was a "second-generation" title for Digital Pictures, their first titles for the Sega CD having been rehashes of titles developed for Hasbro's aborted NEMO system. The game had a $3 million dollar budget. Most of this was generated by the bundling of Sewer Shark with Sega CD consoles.

The game started life with the codename Project X, a script written by Digital Pictures co-founder Ken Melville that was inspired by Invasion of the Body Snatchers and Invaders from Mars. By the time development started, the script had been re-written by Alan B. McElroy, Edward Neumeier and Joshua Stallings.

The game's FMV was shot by a full Hollywood film crew, which meant that Digital Pictures had to negotiate with the Directors Guild, Screen Actors Guild and Writers Guild – the first time this had been done for a video game.

In the game, the film elements suffered due to the technical limitations of the Sega CD. The film had to be processed to reduce it to a palette of 64 colors and to accommodate the slow data transfer rate of the CD drive. Despite the limitations, the game's visual appearance was still described as "breathtaking" for 1993 by Edge. In a retrospective interview with Edge, Ken Melville of Digital Pictures expressed his displeasure at the technical limitations of the video, "All our video had to be tortured, kicking and screaming, into the most horrifying, blurry, reduced-color-palette mess imaginable in the Sega CD. I shudder to think about it"

== Reception ==
Reception

Review scores
Publication	Score
Electronic Gaming Monthly	7.5
Mega	84%

Ground Zero: Texas was a bestseller in the UK for two months. It was the top-selling Mega-CD game in the UK for four months in 1994, from February to May.

It was awarded Best Sega Mega-CD Game of 1994 by Electronic Gaming Monthly. Though their review of the game criticized it for poor control design, bad acting, and corny dialogue, they praised the music and storyline and scored it a 7.5 out of 10.

== Reissue ==
In 2021, the game was released for PlayStation 4 and Windows and was also reissued in its original Sega CD edition by Limited Run Games. The release included remastered footage and some behind the scenes bonus features.
