= Corpse Killer =

1994 video game

- North American 32X box art
- Developer: Digital Pictures
- Publishers: Digital Pictures: Screaming Villains (PS4, PC); Limited Run Games (Switch)
- Director: John Lafia
- Producers: Charles Ogden; Gene Marum
- Designers: Ken Soohoo; Kenneth Melville
- Programmer: Tyler Hogle
- Writer: Kenneth Melville
- Composer: Bradley Smith
- Platforms: Sega CD, 32X, 3DO, Sega Saturn, Windows, Macintosh, PlayStation 4, Nintendo Switch
- Release: November 1994: Sega CD; NA: November 1994; EU: March 1995 32X; NA: 1994; EU: July 1995 3DO; NA: 1994; JP: August 25, 1995 Saturn; NA: November 10, 1995 PlayStation 4, Windows; WW: July 30, 2019 Switch; WW: October 30, 2020
- Genres: Rail shooter, interactive movie
- Mode: Single-player

Corpse Killer is a 1994 rail shooter video game developed and published by Digital Pictures for the Sega CD, 32X, 3DO, Sega Saturn, Windows and Macintosh computers. An interactive variation on the zombie film genre, it utilizes live-action full motion video in a format similar to other games developed by Digital Pictures. Reviews for the game were mixed, generally criticizing the repetitive gameplay and low video quality, though many reviewers enjoyed the campy nature of the cutscenes. Corpse Killer was the first CD game released for the 32X. It was later remastered for Steam, PlayStation 4 and Nintendo Switch.

Footage from the game was recycled for the 2003 film Game Over.

== Plot ==
An unnamed United States Marine is airdropped onto a tropical island on a top-secret mission to stop the evil Dr. Hellman, who plans to release his army of zombies on the world. He is bitten by a zombie and also meets an attractive female reporter named Julie and a Rastafarian male driver named Winston. Four of the marine lieutenant's comrades are captured by Hellman and turned into zombies. To rescue them, the lieutenant infiltrates Hellman's compound and shoots each of them with bullets coated with extract from Datura plants, which can turn freshly created zombies back into humans.

== Gameplay ==
Most of the gameplay is similar to other light gun video games such as Lethal Enforcers. The player moves through the jungle, shooting various zombies, collecting better ammunition (to prepare for a raid on Hellman's compound), and medicine to recover health.

== Development ==
John Lafia directed the live-action footage, which was filmed on location in the Caribbean, with most scenes being shot in Puerto Rico. The actors portraying the zombies wore latex masks.

The Sega Saturn version of the game was released with the subtitle "Graveyard Edition". This version features a few exclusives such as full-screen video (other versions have the FMV boxed in), improved video quality, a difficulty select (ranging from normal to bloodthirsty to cannibal), items and power-ups that drop down from the top of the screen and can be shot and collected, and "in your face" zombie attacks. These attacks involve a zombie that pops up immediately in front of the "camera" and attacks the player. They can only be killed with armor-piercing rounds or Datura rounds. The Saturn version is also the only version of the game to lack light gun support (though there is no mention of light guns in the manual or packaging for the 3DO version, it does, in fact, include light gun support).

== Reception ==
Reception

Review scores
Publication	Score
Electronic Gaming Monthly	5.25/10 (32X); 4.375/10 (SAT)
Next Generation	1/5 (32X, SAT)

Reviewing the Sega CD version, GamePro remarked that "This frisky first-person blast-a-thon looks and feels like a bad live-action movie. But your taste for 'bad' just might bring this Corpse to life." They particularly praised the B-movie production values, "typically grainy but stylish" FMV graphics, and the effective controls even when using a standard gamepad instead of a light gun.

In their review of the 32X version, the four reviewers of Electronic Gaming Monthly said that the "campy, bad b-movie" cutscenes are entertaining but the gameplay is dull, and that the graphics are only slightly improved from the Sega CD version. Next Generation commented that the game itself is "decent", but that the improvement in graphics over the Sega CD version "is so small that only an expert could notice." GamePro reviewed that the 32X version retains the elements that made the Sega CD version fun and has far better graphics.

Electronic Gaming Monthly reversed their position on the game's cutscenes when reviewing the Saturn version, with all save Andrew Baran now saying that the scenes are dull and repetitive. They also criticized the substandard video quality of the FMV and the "laughable" gameplay. GamePro's brief review, while acknowledging the FMV is grainy, noted it was at least superior to any previous version of the game. The reviewer praised the cursor movement's easy control and concluded, "This'll do for zombified Saturn gamers." A brief review from Next Generation published over a year after the game's release criticized the "Cheesy graphics and extremely repetitious gameplay". In 1995, MegaZone included Corpse Killer in their Top 50 Games In History writing: "Great full-motion video and a silly-but-fun plot."

== Re-release ==
William Mesa, Flash Film Works, and Screaming Villains remastered the game from the original source material in 2019 and re-released it as a "25th Anniversary Edition" for Steam, and PlayStation 4. It was also released in physical PS4 media by Limited Run Games. The new version contained several hours' worth of behind-the-scenes video from the original production as well as hundreds of still images, the original production script and other assorted documents.
