= Stonados =

- Written by: Rafael Jordan
- Directed by: Jason Bourque
- Starring: Paul Johansson; Sebastian Spence; Miranda Frigon; Jessica McLeod; Dylan Schmid; William B. Davis; Thea Gill
- Music by: James Jandrisch
- Countries of origin: United States; Canada
- Original language: English

Production
- Producers: Kim Arnott; Dawn Knight; Mary Pantelidis; Robyn Snyder; Mandy Spencer-Phillips; Fernando Szew
- Cinematography: Brenton Spencer
- Editor: Lisa Robison
- Running time: 88 minutes
- Production companies: MarVista Entertainment; Two 4 The Money Media

Original release
- Release: 13 August 2013

Stonados (also known as Stonado) is a 2013 American–Canadian science-fiction action disaster television film directed by Jason Bourque. It is set in Boston and was filmed in Victoria, British Columbia.

== Synopsis ==
A tourist group see a waterspout that forms in the ocean off the coast of Plymouth Rock, then it quickly disappears. Meanwhile, a man playing basketball in Boston gets hit by a rock that falls from the sky out of nowhere.

Maddy, a police officer investigating the falling stones, calls her brother Joe, a science teacher, to help her investigate. Lee, a weather reporter and Joe's friend, goes to the scene with Joe. They theorize that the tornado formed in the sea may have thrown up stones from the sea floor. Joe's son Jackson and daughter Megan have gone to the harbor by themselves. Joe tries to phone them but can't get hold of them.

Ben, a lighthouse keeper on Little Brewster Island, phones Joe telling him about the tornados he is seeing forming in the sea off the coast which is drawing up and dropping stones. The tornados are forming near the harbor, so Joe makes an announcement to evacuate the harbor area.

A waterspout forms in the middle of the harbor, forming a tornado, and starts dropping stones onto the surrounding land, injuring people and destroying buildings. People run from the harbor, as Joe and Lee search the area to find his children. Police officer Maddy, who is Joe's sister, turns up as the tornado dies down. Joe finds his children who have survived the storm. Lee predicts that there will be a lot more tornados forming due to recent volcanic eruptions in the area. Joe runs some computer simulations which back up Lee's predictions.

Another tornado forms in the ocean, and one of the stones hits a car. Joe, Lee and Maddy investigate, finding that the stone is extremely cold. It then explodes and shatters, destroying the car. The biggest tornado yet forms in the Charles river basin, throwing out stones on both sides of the river, causing widespread destruction and killing many people. Lee and his cameraman televise this event, and advise people to stay in their homes. The Field Operating Agency (FOA) see this announcement and want to organize a widespread evacuation of the coastal areas. Joe suggests that the tornados may move inland, causing even more destruction.

A ship gets caught in a tornado and heads towards Little Brewster Island. Ben tells the ship to change its course, but as he is doing this a flying stone hits his lighthouse which collapses on top of him.

A tornado forms inland, destroying many buildings. Although Joe, Lee and Maddy are caught in the storm, they escape unscathed. Joe surmises that the recent volcanic eruptions have created atmospheric instability, causing frozen ozone droplets to form in the atmosphere, which the tornados are pulling down and throwing. Due to the atmospheric pressure change, the frozen ozone is also likely to explode when it lands.

Meanwhile, Megan and Jackson decide to go and watch a football game. Joe, Maddy and Lee go to pick them up, taking backstreet roads to avoid traffic. However, the roads are scattered with frozen stones which they have to navigate through before they explode. The tyres of their van are destroyed by one of the explosions, so they abandon the vehicle and walk on foot. The tornado hits the football stadium, and everyone is evacuated. Joe, Maddy and Lee arrive at the stadium and meet up with Megan and Jackson.

Joe speculates that the tornados might be stopped by raising the temperature of the atmosphere, which can be done by exploding a bomb high in the atmosphere. They manage to get to the FOA, and tell them. They provide Joe with the bomb needed. Another tornado forms, which Joe decides to launch the bomb into so that it is sucked up into the upper atmosphere. Joe and Lee drive towards the tornado with the bomb and jump out of the car just as it is sucked into the tornado. The bomb explodes, dissipating the tornado and dispersing the freak weather, preventing any more tornados from forming.

== Cast ==
- Paul Johansson as Joe Randall, a science professor
- Sebastian Spence as Lee Carlton, a weather reporter
- Miranda Frigon as Maddy Randall, a police officer (Joe Randall's Sister)
- Jessica McLeod as Megan Randall, is Joe Randall's daughter
- Dylan Schmid as Jackson Randall, is Joe Randall's son
- William B. Davis as Ben, a lighthouse keeper
- Grace Vukovic as Julie
- Ben Witmer as Jake
- Thea Gill as Tara Laykin, head of the FOA
- Aliyah O'Brien as Alicia - FOA Assistant
- Josh Byer as Stan
- David Allan Pearson as Tourist
- Dominika Juillet as Vanessa
- Dalias Blake as Defendor
- Hugo Steele as Player
- Katherine Evans as Student
- Alison Boston as Psychic
- Patrick Baynham as Owner
- Fraser Corbett as Swan Boat Operator
