= Digital Pictures =

Defunct video game developer

- Industry: Video game industry
- Founded: 1991
- Founders: Lode Coen; Mark Klein; Ken Melville; Anne Flaut-Reed; Kevin Welsh; Tom Zito
- Defunct: 1996
- Headquarters: San Mateo, California, U.S.
- Products: Interactive movies

Digital Pictures was an American video game developer founded in 1991 by Lode Coen, Mark Klein, Ken Melville, Anne Flaut-Reed, Kevin Welsh and Tom Zito.

The company originated from an attempt to produce a game for the cancelled VHS-based NEMO game system. One of its first titles, Night Trap, was originally produced as a title for the NEMO, before being converted for use with Sega's new Sega CD. The mature-themed content of Night Trap made it the source of some controversy. Nevertheless, the title was a bestseller. Digital Pictures went on to create other full motion video-based titles primarily for Sega hardware, and are regarded as a pioneer of the interactive movie genre. The company declined in the mid-1990s due to waning interest in full motion video games. Its final title, Maximum Surge, went unreleased and was later repurposed into a film called Game Over.

== Full motion video games ==
The founders of Digital Pictures met in the late 1980s while working at a division of the toy manufacturer Hasbro originally called Hasbro Interactive and later renamed Isix. The Isix team developed a video game system called NEMO (a code name abbreviation for "never ever mention outside") that used VHS tapes rather than cartridges, which allowed games to offer live action and interactive full motion video. They also developed a software prototype called Scene Of The Crime, which led to the production of two full-length titles, Night Trap and Sewer Shark.

After Hasbro executives declined to bring the NEMO system to market, closing its Isix division, key members of the Isix team purchased the NEMO software assets from Hasbro and later, in 1991, founded Digital Pictures. Digital Pictures converted Night Trap and Sewer Shark from their video tape-based format to the Sega CD platform.

We're betting, ultimately, when there's an interactive cable converter sitting atop everyone's TV set, that something that feels like Citizen Kane (or at least Leave It to Beaver) will have more legs than something that feels like Mario or Princess Toadstool.

— Tom Zito

Throughout the 1990s, Digital Pictures continued to design interactive full motion video games for the CD-ROM format. Steve Russell worked for the company for a time. Several celebrities, including actors Steve Eastin, Corey Haim, Debbie Harry, Yasmine Bleeth, R. Lee Ermey, and Dana Plato; sports stars Scottie Pippen and Mike Ditka; and musical acts INXS, Kris Kross, C+C Music Factory, and Marky Mark and the Funky Bunch, appeared in Digital Pictures games.

In 1994, when the company was on its height of its popularity, Digital Pictures signed a partnership with Acclaim Entertainment wherein Acclaim bought a stake in the company and Acclaim Distribution would distribute its titles.

== Controversy ==
In the early 1990s, Night Trap was singled out by numerous interest groups and by U.S. senators Joseph Lieberman and Herbert Kohl as evidence that the video game industry was marketing games with graphic violence and other adult content to minors. Concern about Night Trap and several other games such as Mortal Kombat helped to bring about the creation of the Entertainment Software Rating Board video game rating system.

== Decline ==
By the late 1990s, consumer interest in full-motion video games, which accounted for the majority of the company's profits, was in decline. After the collapse of the company, its assets were acquired by Cyber Cinema Interactive. The new company intended to re-release the games for DVD but that never came about. The only actual production for Cyber Cinema was the direct-to-video film Game Over, also known as Maximum Surge Movie. It used footage from an unreleased video game called Maximum Surge as well as clips from other Digital Pictures games. Although the film boasted stars such as Yasmine Bleeth and Walter Koenig, they only appear in the segments that had been pulled from the FMV sequences of the game, which suffer from lower image quality than the original footage.

== Rereleases ==
Flash Film Works later acquired the rights to some of the games. They remastered and rereleased Double Switch and Quarterback Attack for iTunes and Google Play in late 2016 before partnering with Screaming Villains and Limited Run Games to release PlayStation 4 remasters starting in 2018 with Double Switch and 2019 with Corpse Killer. Screaming Villains separately rereleased Night Trap and Ground Zero Texas (two of the games not owned by Flash Film Works) through Limited Run Games. In 2025, Flash Film Works announced that it had sold its rights in the games to the founder of Limited Run Games, Josh Fairhurst.

== Games developed ==
List of games developed by Digital Pictures and all subsequent releases of the games either by it or successor companies.

Title	Cast	Date of release	Format	Reference
Citizen X	Sharee Gregory, Charley Hayward, Peter Kent, Rob Narita, Mark Withers	2002	Sega CD	
Corpse Killer	Vincent Schiavelli, Jeremiah Birkett, Bridget Butler	1994	Sega CD	
Corpse Killer	Vincent Schiavelli, Jeremiah Birkett, Bridget Butler	1994	32X	
Corpse Killer	Vincent Schiavelli, Jeremiah Birkett, Bridget Butler	1995	3DO	
Corpse Killer	Vincent Schiavelli, Jeremiah Birkett, Bridget Butler	1995	Mac	
Corpse Killer	Vincent Schiavelli, Jeremiah Birkett, Bridget Butler	1995	Saturn	
Corpse Killer	Vincent Schiavelli, Jeremiah Birkett, Bridget Butler	2019	PlayStation 4	
Corpse Killer	Vincent Schiavelli, Jeremiah Birkett, Bridget Butler	2019	Windows	
Corpse Killer	Vincent Schiavelli, Jeremiah Birkett, Bridget Butler	2020	Nintendo Switch	
Double Switch	Corey Haim, Deborah Harry, R. Lee Ermey, Irwin Keyes, Camille Cooper	1993	Sega CD	
Double Switch	Corey Haim, Deborah Harry, R. Lee Ermey, Irwin Keyes, Camille Cooper	1995	Saturn	
Double Switch	Corey Haim, Deborah Harry, R. Lee Ermey, Irwin Keyes, Camille Cooper	1995	Windows 95	
Double Switch	Corey Haim, Deborah Harry, R. Lee Ermey, Irwin Keyes, Camille Cooper	2016	Google Play	
Double Switch	Corey Haim, Deborah Harry, R. Lee Ermey, Irwin Keyes, Camille Cooper	2016	iTunes	
Double Switch	Corey Haim, Deborah Harry, R. Lee Ermey, Irwin Keyes, Camille Cooper	2018	PlayStation 4	
Double Switch	Corey Haim, Deborah Harry, R. Lee Ermey, Irwin Keyes, Camille Cooper	2018	Windows	
Double Switch	Corey Haim, Deborah Harry, R. Lee Ermey, Irwin Keyes, Camille Cooper	2019	Nintendo Switch	
Double Switch	Corey Haim, Deborah Harry, R. Lee Ermey, Irwin Keyes, Camille Cooper	2026	PlayStation 5	
Ground Zero: Texas	Steve Eastin, Leslie Zemeckis, Scott Lawrence, Christopher Bradley, Rick Aiello	1993	Sega CD	
Ground Zero: Texas	Steve Eastin, Leslie Zemeckis, Scott Lawrence, Christopher Bradley, Rick Aiello	2021	PlayStation 4	
Ground Zero: Texas	Steve Eastin, Leslie Zemeckis, Scott Lawrence, Christopher Bradley, Rick Aiello	2021	Windows	
Kids on Site	Larry Grennan, Scott McClain, Robin Joss	1994	MS-DOS	
Kids on Site	Larry Grennan, Scott McClain, Robin Joss	1994	Mac	
Kids on Site	Larry Grennan, Scott McClain, Robin Joss	1994	Sega CD	
Kids on Site	Larry Grennan, Scott McClain, Robin Joss	2022	PlayStation 4	
Kids on Site	Larry Grennan, Scott McClain, Robin Joss	2022	Windows	
Kids on Site	Larry Grennan, Scott McClain, Robin Joss	2026	PlayStation 5	
Make My Video: INXS	INXS	1992	Sega CD	
Make My Video: Kris Kross	Kris Kross	1992	Sega CD	
Make My Video: Marky Mark and the Funky Bunch	Marky Mark and the Funky Bunch	1992	Sega CD	
Maximum Surge	Yasmine Bleeth, Walter Koenig, Michael Champion, Andy Hirsch	N/A	3DO	
Maximum Surge	Yasmine Bleeth, Walter Koenig, Michael Champion, Andy Hirsch	N/A	Mac	
Maximum Surge	Yasmine Bleeth, Walter Koenig, Michael Champion, Andy Hirsch	N/A	Saturn	
Maximum Surge	Yasmine Bleeth, Walter Koenig, Michael Champion, Andy Hirsch	N/A	Windows 95	
Night Trap	Dana Plato, Tracy Matheson, Debra Parks, Allison Rhea, Christy Ford	1992	Sega CD	
Night Trap	Dana Plato, Tracy Matheson, Debra Parks, Allison Rhea, Christy Ford	1994	3DO	
Night Trap	Dana Plato, Tracy Matheson, Debra Parks, Allison Rhea, Christy Ford	1994	MS-DOS	
Night Trap	Dana Plato, Tracy Matheson, Debra Parks, Allison Rhea, Christy Ford	1994	32X	
Night Trap	Dana Plato, Tracy Matheson, Debra Parks, Allison Rhea, Christy Ford	1995	Mac	
Night Trap	Dana Plato, Tracy Matheson, Debra Parks, Allison Rhea, Christy Ford	2017	PlayStation 4	
Night Trap	Dana Plato, Tracy Matheson, Debra Parks, Allison Rhea, Christy Ford	2017	Windows	
Night Trap	Dana Plato, Tracy Matheson, Debra Parks, Allison Rhea, Christy Ford	2018	Nintendo Switch	
Night Trap	Dana Plato, Tracy Matheson, Debra Parks, Allison Rhea, Christy Ford	2018	PlayStation Vita	
Night Trap	Dana Plato, Tracy Matheson, Debra Parks, Allison Rhea, Christy Ford	2022	PlayStation 5	
Power Factory Featuring C+C Music Factory	C+C Music Factory	1992	Sega CD	
Prize Fighter	Jimmy Nickerson, Manny Perry, Billy Lucas, Ben Bray	1993	Sega CD	
Prize Fighter	Jimmy Nickerson, Manny Perry, Billy Lucas, Ben Bray	2026		
Prize Fighter	Jimmy Nickerson, Manny Perry, Billy Lucas, Ben Bray	2026	PlayStation 4	
Prize Fighter	Jimmy Nickerson, Manny Perry, Billy Lucas, Ben Bray	2026	PlayStation 5	
Prize Fighter	Jimmy Nickerson, Manny Perry, Billy Lucas, Ben Bray	2026	Windows	
Quarterback Attack with Mike Ditka	Mike Ditka, Keith Neubert, Peter Kent	1995	3DO	
Quarterback Attack with Mike Ditka	Mike Ditka, Keith Neubert, Peter Kent	1995	Saturn	
Quarterback Attack with Mike Ditka	Mike Ditka, Keith Neubert, Peter Kent	1996	MS-DOS	
Quarterback Attack with Mike Ditka	Mike Ditka, Keith Neubert, Peter Kent	2016	Google Play	
Quarterback Attack with Mike Ditka	Mike Ditka, Keith Neubert, Peter Kent	2016	iTunes	
Sewer Shark	David Underwood, Robert Costanzo, Kari G. Peyton	1992	Sega CD	
Sewer Shark	David Underwood, Robert Costanzo, Kari G. Peyton	1994	3DO	
Slam City with Scottie Pippen	Scottie Pippen, Keith Gibbs, Malcolm Ian Cross, Keith Neubert, Dana Wilkerson	1994	Sega CD	
Slam City with Scottie Pippen	Scottie Pippen, Keith Gibbs, Malcolm Ian Cross, Keith Neubert, Dana Wilkerson	1995	MS-DOS	
Slam City with Scottie Pippen	Scottie Pippen, Keith Gibbs, Malcolm Ian Cross, Keith Neubert, Dana Wilkerson	1995	32X	
Supreme Warrior	Vivian Wu, Richard Norton, Roger Yuan, Chuck Jeffreys, Ron Yuan, Chaplin Chang	1994	3DO	
Supreme Warrior	Vivian Wu, Richard Norton, Roger Yuan, Chuck Jeffreys, Ron Yuan, Chaplin Chang	1994	32X	
Supreme Warrior	Vivian Wu, Richard Norton, Roger Yuan, Chuck Jeffreys, Ron Yuan, Chaplin Chang	1994	Sega CD	
Supreme Warrior	Vivian Wu, Richard Norton, Roger Yuan, Chuck Jeffreys, Ron Yuan, Chaplin Chang	1996	MS-DOS	
Supreme Warrior	Vivian Wu, Richard Norton, Roger Yuan, Chuck Jeffreys, Ron Yuan, Chaplin Chang	1996	Mac	
What's My Story?	Jill Wright	1996	Mac	
