= Maximum Surge =

Cancelled video game

Maximum Surge is a cancelled video game by Digital Pictures. Planned for release in 1996 for the 3DO, Mac, PC and Sega Saturn, it was to feature full-motion video in the same way that many of Digital Pictures' releases of the time did. The game's 90 minutes of video footage starred Walter Koenig and Yasmine Bleeth, was directed by William Mesa, and was written by J. Garrett Glover and Charlie Ogden.

According to Flash Film Works, the studio responsible for the special effects used in the game, Maximum Surge was never released. However, the ESRB's website lists a rating for the game on multiple platforms, suggesting that the project made it at least to the late stages of development. A short playable demo of Maximum Surge was released as part of a Digital Pictures Windows 95 demo disk.

== Plot ==
The game is set in the 21st century. The player character, an unnamed soldier, is hired to protect the Brokaw Territory and stop Drexel (Walter Koenig), who is trying to replace humanity with evil cyborg beings which transfer information by means of umbilical data cords. It is up to the player character to destroy his bases and ultimately face him in the final battle. Alongside him in the fight are a mercenary named Jo (Yasmine Bleeth), a computer hacker, and the resistance commander.

== Production ==
Maximum Surge differed from previous Digital Pictures games in that the gameplay graphics were not crafted from standalone full motion video, but from bits of full motion video superimposed upon traditional computer graphic backgrounds. This allowed the gameplay to break from the on-rails format typical of FMV-based games, giving the player the ability to look from left to right to a limited extent in order to shoot enemies who appear outside the player's initial range of vision. Digital Pictures president Tom Zito commented that "Maximum Surge is really the first game in which we used the camera as a tool rather than as a recording device. Just as if you were going to create Doom, you would go to a SGI workstation and create all the pieces of Doom as computer graphics, in Maximum Surge we have taken a video camera and done exactly the same thing."

The video footage was filmed in Hollywood and Long Beach, California. Yasmine Bleeth commented "Maximum Surge was a completely new experience for me. It was great to get tough and gritty. The whole concept of CD-ROM is still mind-blowing to me."

Footage from this and other Digital Pictures games was used by Insight Film and Video Production, Shavick Entertainment, and Avrio Filmworks to create a movie originally titled Maximum Surge Movie, which was later rereleased on DVD by York Entertainment under the name Game Over.

The game cost $3 million to develop.
