= Night Trap =

1992 interactive movie

- North American Sega CD box art
- Developer: Digital Pictures
- Publisher: Sega: Sega (Sega CD) Virgin Interactive (3DO) Digital Pictures (32X, MS-DOS, Mac OS) Screaming Villains (PS4, Vita, PC, Switch)
- Director: James Riley
- Producers: Ric LaCivita; Kevin Welsh
- Designers: James Riley; Rob Fulop
- Programmer: Gene Kusmiak
- Artist: Lode Coen
- Writer: Terry McDonell
- Composers: Sunny BlueSkyes; Martin Lund
- Platform: Sega CD: 32X, 3DO, MS-DOS, Mac OS, PlayStation 4, PlayStation 5, Windows, Nintendo Switch, PlayStation Vita
- Release: November 1992: Sega CD; NA: November 1992; PAL: June 1993; JP: November 19, 1993 32X; NA: January 1995; PAL: 1995 3DO; NA: December 1993 MS-DOS, Mac OS; NA: October 1994; NA: 1995 (Director's Cut) PlayStation 4, Windows; WW: August 15, 2017 Switch; WW: August 24, 2018 PlayStation Vita; WW: November 2, 2018
- Genre: Interactive movie
- Mode: Single-player

Night Trap is a 1992 interactive movie developed by Digital Pictures and published by Sega for the Sega CD. Presented primarily through full-motion video (FMV), Night Trap has the player observe a group of teenage girls having a sleepover at a house which, unbeknownst to them, is infested with vampires. The player watches live surveillance footage and triggers traps to capture anyone endangering the girls. The player can switch between different cameras to keep watch over the girls and eavesdrop on conversations to follow the story and listen for clues.

The Night Trap concept originated in a 1986 prototype game developed by Axlon to demonstrate their Control-Vision game console to Hasbro. The system used VHS tape technology to present film-like gaming experiences. With the system picked up by Hasbro, the production of Night Trap commenced. The video footage was recorded in 1987, followed by six months of editing and game programming. Hasbro suddenly canceled the Control-Vision in 1989, which prompted the game's executive producer, Tom Zito, to purchase the film footage and found Digital Pictures to complete Night Trap. The game was eventually released in November 1992 as the first interactive movie on the Sega CD, becoming a North American launch title for the add-on.

Night Trap initially received mixed reviews from critics, who praised its B movie-esque quality, humor, and video animation, but criticized the gameplay as shallow. The game was one of the principal subjects of a 1993 United States Senate committee hearing on violent video games, along with Lethal Enforcers and Mortal Kombat. Night Trap was cited during the hearing as promoting gratuitous violence and sexual aggression against women, prompting toy retailers Toys "R" Us and Kay-Bee Toys to pull the game from shelves that December, and Sega to cease producing copies in January 1994. The Senate hearing led to the creation of the Entertainment Software Rating Board (ESRB), the North American video game ratings board still used today. The controversy surrounding Night Trap inspired its designer, Rob Fulop, to then create a contrastingly "cute" game, which was released as Dogz: Your Computer Pet in 1995.

After the controversy subsided, Night Trap was ported to other systems, including the 32X, 3DO Interactive Multiplayer, MS-DOS, and Mac OS. It was re-released in 2017 and 2018 for eighth-generation consoles to mark its 25th anniversary. Retrospective reviews of Night Trap were negative, owing to FMV's aging appeal as a game medium, and it has been cited as one of the worst video games of all time, though has become a cult classic for its camp style.

== Gameplay ==
A screenshot of the Sega CD version, showing the user interface

Night Trap is an interactive movie video game that uses full motion video (FMV) to present the story and gameplay. The player is instructed by the in-game police squad to watch live surveillance footage of the Martin household and trigger traps to capture anyone that is seen endangering the house guests. Cameras are in eight locations in and around the house: the entryway, living room, kitchen, bedroom, bathroom, driveway, and two hallways. A map is available so the player can see how the rooms are connected. The player can freely switch between viewing the different cameras to keep up with house activities and pick up clues from conversations. Kelli, an undercover agent, provides clues to the player. The player must avoid trapping her, any other agent, or the house guests.

When someone is within range of a trap, a sensor bar will move into a red zone. Activating the trap at this moment will capture them. If the trap is activated when the bar is not in the red zone, the trap will not work and will become disabled for a short period of time. The traps will only work if the access code is correct. There are six possible access codes, and the player can eavesdrop on conversations to find out when the Martins change the code. When a new code is learned, the player must wait until the speaker leaves the room before changing the access code to the correct color to maintain control of the traps. Counters on the screen indicate how many perpetrators have entered the house and how many have been captured.

== Cast ==
- Dana Plato as Kelli
- Tracy Matheson as Cindy
- Debra Parks as Lisa
- Allison Rhea as Ashley
- Christy Ford as Megan
- Jon Rashad Kamal as Victor Martin
- Marion "Molly" Starr as Sheila Martin
- Suzy Cote as Sarah Martin
- Andras Jones as Jeff Martin
- Giovanni Lemm as Tony
- William Bertrand as Eddie
- Tony Dalton as a soldier

== Plot ==
The opening exposition to Night Trap is presented to the player by Cmdr. Simms of the Sega Control Attack Team (S.C.A.T.) on Sega CD, or Special Control Attack Team in other versions. He explains that the team was alerted to the disappearance of five teenage girls who were last seen at the Martin winery estate. The Martin family consists of Victor Martin, his wife Sheila, their children Jeff and Sarah, and cousin Tony. The missing girls were reportedly invited to stay for the night.

Police questioned the Martin family, but they claimed the girls had left safely, and they refused to let the police search the property. The police then handed over the case to S.C.A.T., which investigated the house and discovered a series of traps, security cameras, and an operational unit in the basement to control the apparatus. The S.C.A.T. agents spliced an override cable onto the control system and connected it to a control panel in the back hallway of the house. The player is given the role of an internal S.C.A.T. operative charged with controlling the traps and cameras from this back hallway.

Five more teenage girls head towards the estate, Kelli, Ashley, Lisa, Cindy, and Megan. S.C.A.T. has placed agent Kelli Medd (Note: The spelling of the character's first name has been published in different forms. The game's end credits list it with a "y"; the instruction manual spells it with an "i".) within the group as an undercover agent. The girls are not aware of her true identity. Also with the girls is Danny, Lisa's younger brother. The house is invaded by Augers, vampiric beings that need blood to survive. The Martin family themselves are full vampires. The following events and the ending vary widely depending on which characters the player saves from the Augers.

== Development ==
=== Concept ===
Rob Fulop, developer of Demon Attack (1982) and other Atari games, began working with Atari founder Nolan Bushnell at his company Axlon shortly after the video game crash of 1983. James Riley was also working with Bushnell at the time on a series of interactive retail advertising campaigns. Riley received a call from Fulop, his neighbor, who explained that an engineer presented an interesting device to another one of Bushnell's employees, Tom Zito. The system used VHS technology to create movie-like gaming experiences and allowed four video tracks to be played simultaneously. The team dubbed this system "NEMO" (Never Ever Mention Outside).

Scene of the Crime was created to demonstrate the NEMO to Hasbro and test new gameplay ideas.

Zito wanted to put together some demos to present the technology to Hasbro. Riley wanted to create an environment the player could move freely about, leading to the idea of surveillance cameras. Fulop and Riley were inspired by the play Tamara (1981) which ran parallel stories running in 13 different rooms. The audience would need to decide for themselves which stories they wanted to follow. Fulop and Riley watched the play three times over the course of a weekend in 1985. Fulop and Riley liked the design model and thought it would make a good basis for an interactive media experience.

A prototype game titled Scene of the Crime was produced to demonstrate the new technology to Hasbro and test the surveillance camera gameplay. It was a short five-minute demo where the player follows suspicious characters around a house to find who stole a stash of money. The player switches between cameras to observe the characters and eavesdrop on their conversations; all the characters have a plot to steal the money. At the end of the game, the player must guess who stole the money. In December 1986, the team flew to Hasbro headquarters in Pawtucket, Rhode Island, and pitched the technology to Hasbro CEO Stephen Hassenfeld and a boardroom of 22 executives, who liked the system and gave funding to support further development for the technology and games.

Ready to begin work on a full game, the NEMO team returned to the idea of surveillance cameras but wanted to make a more interactive and engaging experience. Zito originally had a plan for an interactive movie based on the A Nightmare on Elm Street film series. After negotiations with the film studio fell through, Zito hired Terry McDonell to write an original script. Zito has since identified Riley, Fulop, and McDonell as the three main creative minds behind Night Trap.

A cross-functional team of writers, directors, game designers, and programmers discussed how to blend the art of film with the interactivity of video games to create a compelling interactive narrative. The initial idea was to take the basis of Scene of the Crime to an extreme with a billionaire leaving an extremely large sum of money alone in a large house, guarded by a state-of-the-art security system. In this concept, the billionaire's daughter is staying at the house with her teenage friends when the house is attacked by ninja burglars who are attempting to steal the money.

Through much deliberation, the game evolved into the final vampire concept seen in Night Trap. Hasbro was concerned that the game may feature "reproducible violence". As a result, Hasbro did not want the vampires, later dubbed Augers, to bite or move too quickly. In addition, the device used by the Augers to drain blood from their victims was purposely designed to pass Hasbro's non-reproducible violence requirements.

=== Production and release ===
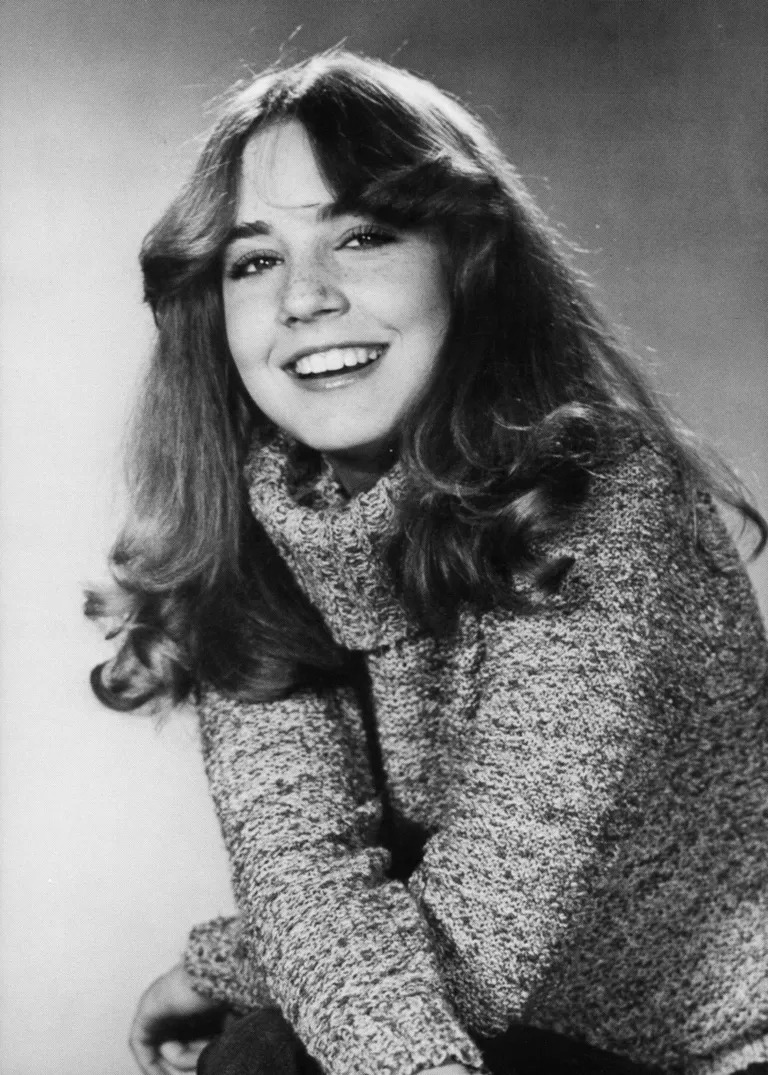
Actress Dana Plato plays the leading role of Kelli Medd, and was the most notable cast member in Night Trap.

Night Trap was developed over six months and was part movie shoot and part programming. The film was shot on 35 mm film in Culver City, California, across 16 days in 1987, with editing taking another few months. The film was directed by James Riley. The director of photography was Don Burgess, who later went on to shoot the award-winning Forrest Gump (1994). Originally the set was going to be darker, but it was made brighter for fear the footage would pixelate in-game. The script was unusual because it was built around the multi-linear gameplay. Riley was focused on timing the shoots correctly to sync the movement of actors among the rooms. There were four scenes occurring simultaneously at any given time, although there were eight rooms (the other four being still images).

Dana Plato was the most famous actor involved, known for her work on the American sitcom Diff'rent Strokes (1978–1986). Plato's career was spiraling downward at the time, partially due to her personal problems with drugs and alcohol. Fulop recounted that at first, she was very professional, but later she began showing up late and did not want to rehearse. The Augers were played by stuntmen. They developed a hobbling walk so that they would always be prepared to fall when the traps dropped under their feet.

The software was developed concurrently with the filming and editing. Through developing Night Trap, Fulop and his team came to realize their old-fashioned development methods did not always work with interactive movies. The team could not go back and "tweak" on-screen elements and other assets, such as inserting new scenes or changing the time an actor comes into view. They had to work with the video footage they were handed over.

Night Trap was ready for the launch of the NEMO in 1989 alongside another interactive movie, Sewer Shark. Both games had a combined budget of about US$4.5 million ($1.5 million for Night Trap, and $3 million for Sewer Shark) making them two of the most expensive video games of the era. Just before the launch of the NEMO in early 1989, which was now called the Control-Vision, Hasbro canceled the system release. The company cited high hardware costs as the reason. The system was originally intended to sell for $199, but the high manufacturing costs of the system's DRAM drove it to US$299 (equivalent to $776.6 in 2025). In contrast, the market-leading Nintendo Entertainment System sold for around $100 in 1989. Riley also cited the high cost of filmmaking for deterring Hasbro.

Zito purchased the rights to the abandoned Control-Vision games, and after learning that Sony was considering Sewer Shark for a release on its forthcoming Super NES CD-ROM, he founded his own company to bring them to the system, Digital Pictures. When the Super NES CD-ROM failed to materialize, Zito began working with Sega for a release on the Sega CD. Night Trap transitioned from VHS to CD-ROM and was released in November 1992 for the Sega CD, five years after it was originally filmed. The game was subsequently discussed in the UK Parliament in December 1993 during a debate on television violence and video game classification, where it was cited as a prominent example of a game requiring classification because of its use of live actors. In May 1993, British censors banned the game from being sold to children under 15 years old in the United Kingdom, which led to Sega creating the Videogame Rating Council (VRC) age rating system. Sega also released the Sega CD version in Japan on November 19, 1993.

== United States congressional hearings ==
In the "nightgown scene", Lisa is captured by the enemies and taken off camera. This scene was cited as promoting violence against women at a United States Senate hearing.

External videos
- "Video Game Violence", US Senate Governmental Affairs & Judicial Subcommittees (December 9, 1993)

On December 9, 1993, a United States Senate committee held a hearing on the subject of video game violence. The hearing was led by senators Joe Lieberman and Herb Kohl and was covered in major newspapers including USA Today, The Washington Post and The New York Times. At the hearing, the committee scrutinized Night Trap along with Midway's Mortal Kombat (1992). Lieberman claimed Night Trap featured gratuitous violence and promoted sexual aggression against women. One game over scene considered particularly offensive involved the nightgown-clad character Lisa being captured by Augers attempting to drain her blood. Tom Zito attempted to explain the context of the nightgown scene in defense of the game, but he claims he was silenced.

In the short documentary Dangerous Games (included with PC versions), the producers and cast explained the plot was to prevent the trapping and killing of women. In addition, the blood draining device was intended to look unrealistic to mitigate the violence. There are scenes in which the girls are grabbed or pulled by enemies, but no nudity or extreme acts of violence. Fulop was irked that Night Trap was compared to Mortal Kombat, which features ultraviolent gore, such as a character ripping the heart out of an opponent.

During the hearings, Nintendo of America senior vice president Howard Lincoln testified that Night Trap would never appear on a Nintendo system because it did not pass its guidelines. Fulop believed Lincoln was referring to technical guidelines—Night Trap could not run on a Nintendo system due to the lack of a CD-ROM drive—but Lincoln made it sound as if the game was unworthy of Nintendo's moral standards. Critics noted this as a deliberate move from Nintendo to distance itself from the scandal and make Sega look unfavorable.

As a result of the publicity generated by the hearings, retailers sold 50,000 copies of Night Trap the following week. Two weeks before Christmas, the game was removed from store shelves in the United States' two largest toy store chains, Toys "R" Us and Kay-Bee Toys, after receiving numerous complaints that were suspected to be part of an organized telephone campaign. Both stores continued to stock Mortal Kombat. The Night Trap box art was also criticized by interest groups for what many believed to be a sexist depiction.

In January 1994, Sega withdrew Night Trap from the market. Bill White, Sega Vice President of Marketing, stated that Night Trap was pulled because the continuing controversy surrounding it prevented constructive dialogue about an industry-wide rating system. He also stated that the game was misunderstood and was developed as a parody of vampire melodramas. Sega also announced in January the upcoming release of a censored version. The hearings led to the creation of the Entertainment Software Rating Board (ESRB) in 1994, the video game ratings board in North America still used today. After the controversy subsided, the game was ported to the 3DO, Sega 32X, MS-DOS, and Mac OS, each with a different cover from the original. Virgin Games released the 3DO version in Japan on June 25, 1994.

== Reception ==
Reception

Review scores
Publication	Score
Computer and Video Games	71% (SCD)
Dragon	4/5 (SCD)
Edge	5/10 (3DO)
Electronic Gaming Monthly	5/10, 8/10, 6/10, 5/10 (SCD)
Famitsu	9/10, 8/10, 9/10, 7/10 (SCD)
GameFan	60%, 74%, 70%, 69% (SCD)
Next Generation	1/5 (32X)
Electronic Games	89% (SCD)
Sega Zone	58% (SCD)
Sega Force	84% (SCD)
Mean Machines Sega	89% (SCD)
Mega	85% (SCD)
Wizard	A+ (SCD)

Initial reviews for Night Trap on the Sega CD were mixed. It was the first interactive movie on the system and was thus seen as breaking new ground in both genre and technology. Critics were quick to point out the game's B movie qualities that were reminiscent of teen horror movies. The staff at Sega Force said that playing the game was like "directing your own B movie. Night Trap makes you feel part of the game." Critics identified the "warped" and "tacky" sense of humor as helping the game's appeal and adding to its charm.

From a technological perspective, the video was praised for being high-quality and smooth, although the Sega CD's low color capabilities were identified as a weakness. The most common point of complaint was the gameplay. Some critics cited it for being boring and shallow because it mostly involved pressing one button at the right time to trap the enemies. The staff at Computer and Video Games said Night Trap was reminiscent of Dragon's Lair (1983) and Space Ace (1984) and shared the same issues those games had with gameplay just being a matter of hitting buttons in the right moments.

Reviewing the game in Wizard magazine, Glenn Rubenstein said that Night Trap "could be called the best game ever. Well maybe not the best, but it certainly is the most entertaining, that's for sure." He particularly praised the use of live actors and the need to play through the game multiple times in order to see everything.

Ports of Night Trap to other platforms received more harsh reviews; critics said the game did not age well. Staff at GamePro said it was "innovative at one time, but Trap's graphics and sounds now play like standard stuff." Reviewers at GameFan blamed the game's extensive publicity for making it seem better than it truly was, saying "it's a so-so game that got a lot more attention than it deserved."

Critics overwhelmingly found the game to be boring and dull. Next Generation called it "one of the most crashing bores ever released...this is a nongame." Critics agreed that the 3DO and 32X provided a larger color palette and higher-quality video than the Sega CD original. Night Trap was a commercial success, with sales totaling 400,000 copies by 1998. By 1994, 100,000 copies had been sold in the United States alone.

In retrospect, Night Trap is viewed negatively and is mostly remembered for the controversy it stirred. It was ranked the 12th worst video game of all time by Electronic Gaming Monthly editor Seanbaby in 2001. He and other game journalists also featured the game in a 2007 episode of Broken Pixels, a comedy web series that covers bad and obscure games. Yahoo! Games listed it among the most controversial games of all time in 2007, saying: "If it weren't for controversy...this throwaway Sega CD game would have drifted into obscurity as merely another failed attempt at marrying gameplay with live-action video." Hardcore Gaming 101 and Ars Technica both highlighted the game's cult classic status and camp appeal.

Game Informer listed the game among the worst horror games of all time in 2008. It was ranked number 59 on GamesRadar's 100 worst games of all time in 2014, in which they believed it was "less of a game and more a test of patience". In 1996, Computer Gaming World listed Night Trap at number six of 50 worst games of all time, saying that it was "the ultimate experience of FMV gone bad". After Night Trap's release, Rob Fulop went on to form PF.Magic, which later created the Petz virtual pet simulation series, partly inspired by the negativity surrounding Night Trap.

== Re-release ==
In May 2014, Night Trap designer James Riley announced that he was in talks to re-release the game with improved resolution and gameplay. That August, a Kickstarter campaign appeared for the game's original creators, who formed a company titled Night Trap LLC. The developers said that if the campaign was successful, they would be looking into re-releasing other Digital Pictures titles. The company was also considering making a sequel to the original game. The Kickstarter failed, only gaining $39,843 of its $330,000 goal.

In May 2016, game developer Tyler Hogle created a tech demo of Night Trap being played on a smartphone. Hogle had previously worked on official ports for two other Digital Pictures games, Double Switch (1993) and Quarterback Attack (1995). He posted a short video of his Night Trap demo online anonymously, and some gaming websites published stories on the video and contacted Tom Zito to ask if he was involved. Hogle got into contact with Zito, and the two began working towards a full release. The original source code and 1987 master footage were lost. Riley possessed a copy of the timed master footage and provided it to Hogle. Because the footage was already timed, it was easier for Hogle to develop. He had to replay the original game multiple times to learn what actions triggered which scenes.

In April 2017, Night Trap: 25th Anniversary Edition was announced to commemorate the game's 25th anniversary. The game was released on PlayStation 4 and Windows on August 15, 2017, with an Xbox One release planned for the future. The game was developed and published by Hogle's Screaming Villains, and a limited-edition physical release by Limited Run Games was made available for the PlayStation 4 with three different cover art variations available that mimic the packaging of the original Sega CD release, the later Sega CD release, and the 32X version.

The ESRB gave the re-release a "Teen" rating, a grade lower than the original's "Mature" rating. The anniversary edition of Night Trap uses the full uncompressed video footage with various new additions: deleted scenes including an introduction and a death scene featuring Danny, a behind-the-scenes developer commentary, a "theater mode" to watch all the story-related videos, a "survivor mode" which places Augers randomly in the house, and a playable version of Scene of the Crime.

On August 24 2018, the anniversary edition was released on the Nintendo Switch. A version for the PlayStation Vita was also released. In 2023, to commemorate April Fool's Day, Limited Run Games announced a Game Boy Advance port of Night Trap. The version was only available for preorder that weekend, and shipped in 2024. Unlike other versions, the Game Boy Advance game features no gameplay and only plays the video scenes.
