= Slam City with Scottie Pippen =

1994 video game

- Cover art
- Developer: Digital Pictures
- Publisher: Digital Pictures
- Platforms: Sega CD, Sega 32X, MS-DOS
- Release: November 1994
- Genres: FMV game, sports game

Slam City with Scottie Pippen is the first FMV basketball video game. It was developed by Digital Pictures for the PC and CD-ROM-based video game consoles such as the Sega CD. Scottie Pippen stars in the game, and performs the theme song. Ron Stein, who had previously directed the video footage for Prize Fighter, directed the video footage for the game. A 3DO Interactive Multiplayer version was announced but never released.

In the game, players face various opponents in one-on-one games of basketball, including Pippen himself. The game is spread across four discs, which must be swapped out based on the current opponent.

The game allowed full screen video playback of low resolution MPEG video without specialized hardware utilizing video compression technology that Digital Pictures dubbed "Digichrome". Lag free on-screen selection was accomplished through a disc layout and buffering technology the company called "Instaswitch".

== Reception ==
Reception

Review scores
Publication	Score
Electronic Gaming Monthly	7/10 (Sega CD); 5.5/10 (32X)
Next Generation	3/5 (Sega CD); 2/5 (32X)

GamePro gave the Sega CD version a negative review. Though they remarked that the video footage is of the same high quality as that in Prize Fighter, they felt that it becomes repetitive too quickly, with players limited to a small, crude selection of moves that yield the same video clips over and over. They also complained of extremely inaccurate controls. Next Generation, in contrast, said the game proved that full-motion video games have potential. They noted the problem with consistency within the gameplay (like the opponents having a bad habit of instantly breaking by for a dunk even when they appear to be 10 feet away), and some issues with controls, but ultimately called it solid entertainment for basketball fans. The two sports reviewers of Electronic Gaming Monthly both gave it a 7 out of 10, remarking that the game is dauntingly difficult but ultimately fun, with excellent video sequences.

The two sports reviewers of Electronic Gaming Monthly gave the 32X version scores of 5 and 6 out of 10, this time finding the game's difficulty more vexing. One of them echoed GamePro's criticism of repetitive gameplay, while the other praised the full-motion video concept but said the game is too difficult to play. A different GamePro critic gave the 32X version a much more mixed review, criticizing the slow reaction time on the controls but praising the game's presentation, particularly the realistic trash talking and the vast improvement in graphics over the Sega CD version. Next Generation, however, felt this was insufficient justification for owning all three consoles required to play the game. Despite noting 32X version had better video and sound than the Sega CD, they considered it inferior compared to other versions.

== See also ==
- Barkley Shut Up and Jam!
- Michael Jordan: Chaos in the Windy City
- Shaq Fu
