= Dominika Wolski =

Polish-born Canadian actress

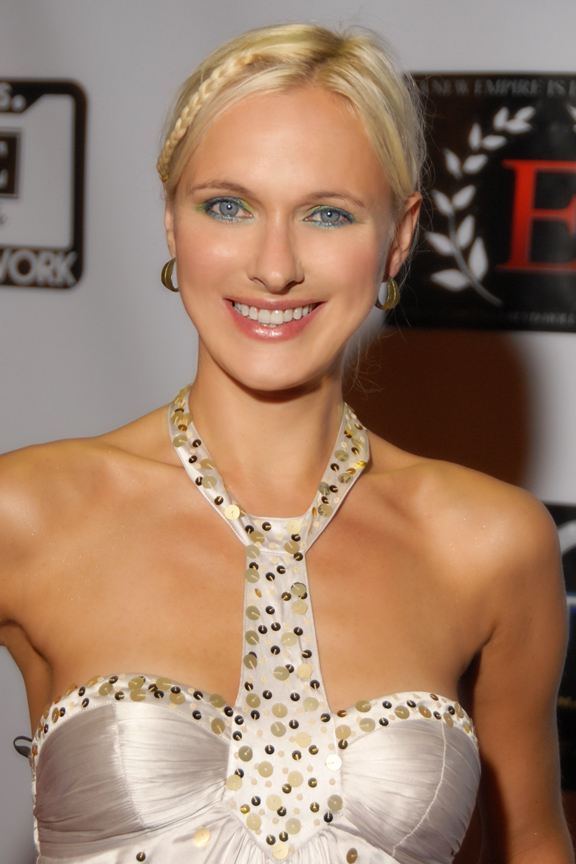
- Dominika Wolski attending the Birthday Party of Devon Guzzie at Empire, Hollywood, CA on 25 Sept. 2009
- Born: 4 February 1975 (age 51); Szczecin, Poland
- Occupation: Actress

Dominika Wolski (born 4 May in Szczecin, Poland) is a Polish-born, Canadian-raised actress living between Vancouver and Los Angeles.

== Biography ==
Born in Szczecin, Poland, Wolski emigrated to North America at the age of 7. Her parents came from both aristocratic and country lineage. She began acting and writing stories at the same time as a youngster and her work, both on and off screen, reflects a mixture of classical and rebellious influences, the aristocratic debutante and the country girl.

She is classically trained but is known as a supporting actress who, "takes risks and brings a refreshing energy", (Jason Bourque, director, Game Over). In her first five years of acting, she worked with names such as Jeremiah S. Chechik, Bobby Roth, Jessica Alba, Dominic Purcell, Mischa Barton, Roland Joffé, and Bruce Greenwood. Her career primarily is kept alive from working with Jason Bourque, who she has had a long time relationship with, and has directed her in the majority of her credits. She has been interviewed on MTV Canada and enRoute.

Wolski was notably awarded a CBC mini series out of 1400 applicants nationwide for a pilot she wrote and starred in. The final series "Under the Cover" would also feature both her talents as a writer and as an actress. The original pilot was shown on Much Music and acquired for distribution by Cineflix. Wolski's other writing accomplishments include a Leo-Award-winning music video concept in which she also played a pixie ("Walk the Talk" for Sean Hogan) and an award-winning Bravo!FACT for artist Wyckham Porteous: again, Wolski both wrote the concept and played a leading role in the story line. She has said many times of her work as a hyphenate, "It's not for every actor but since I have an English degree, it works. Plus, I can either sit here and lament at the lack of intriguing dynamic roles for girls or I can stop whining and do something about it."

Wolski's features are often compared to those of a young Uma Thurman, and her natural energy is likened to Cameron Diaz: the tall gamine's physique is deceiving to some degree since Wolski was part of a national volleyball recruit camp for the Olympic Games and enjoys a variety of sports, horse riding and film-related weapons use.

She plays classical piano and speaks Polish, French and English. Since switching to a serious pursuit of a film career in 2001, Wolski has guest starred on almost every series on the West Coast Vancouver film scene including Under the Cover which she wrote and starred in. Wolski travelled to Mozambique by invitation of director Ed Zwick to visit the set of Blood Diamond: she was also a guest at the Los Angeles premiere in December. Wolski actively supports actors working for social and environmental change: she is a member of Hollywood Hill, drives a VW Beetle and hopes to help promote clean diamonds as an alternative for her fellow actresses for glamorous events. She is also a big fan of animal & dog causes - her childhood "brother" was a large German Shepherd/Wolf cross called "Nero".

In 2009, Wolski appeared in You and I directed by Roland Joffe and with Jason Statham in an Audi advertisement that debuted during Super Bowl XLIII and has been cast in Demian Lichtenstein's film "Relentless."

In February 2010, Dominika guest starred on MTV's new series Warren the Ape as Ludmilla, a Russian astrophysicist, Glamour’s April 2010 issue and reappeared in the new Froote Collection.

In 2011, after an unexpected enforced 12-month hiatus, Dominika returned as Sasha in "Seattle Superstorm" and as the lead role in American World Pictures' film "Dragon Wasps", which released in March 2012. In 2012 Dominika also completed three new Syfy films and was named as ambassador for Drive Around the World, an organization taking a converted electric Hummer across the South Pole with Buzz Aldrin and Steve Wozniak. She is also the face of Azada couture by Italian actress Tara Haggiag.

== Filmography ==
=== Films ===
- 2000: The Guardian
- 2001: Ripper as Kissing Blonde/Grinding Girl
- 2003: Game Over as Elaine Barker
- 2010: Fetch as Magdalena Nowak
- 2011: You and I as Russian Super Model
- 2012: Dragon Wasps as Gina Humphries
- 2012: Dracano as Brayden Adcox
- 2012: Stonados as Vanessa
- 2013: Sink Hole as Heather
- 2016: Vanquisher as Miranda May

==== Shorts ====
- 2003: Art History as Stella Anderson

=== Television ===
==== Series ====
- 2001: The Chris Isaak Show (1: Episode: Wages of Fear)
- 2001: Pasadena (1 Episode: Henry's Secret) as Candy
- 2002: Jeremiah (1 Episode: City of Roses) as Chloe
- 2002: Dark Angel (2 Episodes: Love Among the Runes, Exposure) as Priestess
- 2003: John Doe (1 Episode: Shock to the System) as Bruised
- 2004: Andromeda (2 Episodes: Fear Burns Down to Ashes, Machinery of the Mind) as Hada
- 2006: Three Moons Over Milford (1 Episode: Wrestlemoonia)
- 2008: jPod (3 Episodes: Emo-tion Capture, I Love Turtles, The Betty and Veronica Syndrome) as Ellen
- 2010: Warren the Ape (1 Episode: Amends) as Ludmilla Laika

==== Films ====
- 2003: Maximum Surge as Elaine Barker
- 2003: Under the Cover as Tabatha
- 2004: Meltdown as Tamara
- 2012: Seattle Superstorm as Sasha
- 2015: The Wrong Girl as Hana
- 2016: I Didn't Kill My Sister as Lois Summer

==== TV shorts ====
- 2002: Below the Belt
