= Power Factory Featuring C+C Music Factory =

1993 video game

- Developer: Digital Pictures
- Publisher: Sony Imagesoft
- Platform: Sega CD
- Release: 1993
- Genre: Music Video Editor

Power Factory Featuring C+C Music Factory is a 1993 video game developed by Digital Pictures and published by Sony Imagesoft for the Sega CD.

Power Factory is an example of a music industry game: the game puts the player in control of editing the music videos for dance-pop group C+C Music Factory on 3 different songs: "Gonna Make You Sweat," "Things That Make You Go Hmmm..." and "Here We Go Let's Rock & Roll.", and takes place in a fictional "music factory". Digital Pictures also released three more games in the same style, the Make My Video series.

== Reception ==
Paul Mellerick of MEGA magazine reviewed the game at 55/100, describing the game as relatively short for what it offers.
