= Slam City =

Slam City may refer to:

== Film and TV ==
- Pitch Black: Slam City, a 2000 animated short film
- WWE Slam City, an animated show produced by WWE

== Other ==
- Slam City Jam, a North American skateboarding championship
- Slam City with Scottie Pippen, the first FMV basketball video game
