= Make My Video =

Make My Video is a series of three video games by Digital Pictures in 1992 for the Sega CD, featuring the musical groups INXS, Kris Kross, and Marky Mark and the Funky Bunch. The games featured three songs from the respective musical groups, and the player edited pre-made clips to make a new music video.

In each game, players are given instructions of what they should include in the video, and then the song is played while the video is edited live. Players can change between video clips available by pressing the buttons on the controller, and choose from clips of videos of the group, stock footage, movie clips, and special effects.

The games were panned by critics and were financial failures.

== Games ==
=== INXS ===
INXS: Make My Video
- Developer: Digital Pictures
- Publisher: Sega
- Platform: Sega CD
- Release: October 15, 1992
- Genre: Music video editor
- Mode: Single-player

INXS: Make My Video was created as a video game by Digital Pictures in 1992. The game puts the player in control of editing the music videos for the band INXS on the songs "Heaven Sent", "Baby Don't Cry", and "Not Enough Time". All three songs are from the 1992 album Welcome to Wherever You Are, and the box art for the game is taken from the album.

=== Kris Kross ===
Kris Kross: Make My Video
- Developer: Digital Pictures
- Publisher: Sony Imagesoft
- Platform: Sega CD
- Release: 1992
- Genre: Music video editor

Kris Kross: Make My Video was created as a video game by Digital Pictures in 1992, due to the popularity of the rap group Kris Kross.

The game puts the player in control of editing the music videos for the group on the songs: "Jump", "I Missed the Bus", and "Warm It Up".

=== Marky Mark and the Funky Bunch ===
Marky Mark and the Funky Bunch: Make My Video
- Developer: Digital Pictures
- Publisher: Sega
- Platform: Sega CD
- Release: October 15, 1992
- Genre: Music video editor
- Mode: Single-player

Marky Mark and the Funky Bunch: Make My Video was created as a video game by Digital Pictures in 1992.

The game puts the player in control of editing the music videos for hip-hop artist Mark Wahlberg and his group Marky Mark and the Funky Bunch on the songs "Good Vibrations", "I Need Money", and "You Gotta Believe".

== Reception ==
All three games turned out to be huge failures, both financially and critically. In 1997 Electronic Gaming Monthly listed the series collectively as number 2 on their "Top 10 Worst Games of All Time". Kris Kross is on Seanbaby's Crapstravaganza list of the 20 worst games of all time at #18.

Game Informer gave Marky Mark 0 out of 10, the lowest score a game ever received from the magazine. A 2006 PC World article rated the game as number 8 on their list of the 10 worst games of all time.

== See also ==
- Power Factory Featuring C+C Music Factory
