= Galaxis =

- Film poster
- Directed by: William Mesa
- Written by: Nick Davis
- Produced by: Patrick D. Cheh; Eung Pyo Choi; Barry L. Collier; Paul L. Newman; Nile Niami
- Starring: Brigitte Nielsen; Richard Moll; Craig Fairbrass
- Cinematography: Robert C. New
- Edited by: Gregory Hobson; Patrick Lussier
- Music by: Christopher L. Stone
- Production companies: Interlight; Morphosis Production Inc.; Prism Entertainment Corporation
- Distributed by: Cine Plus Home Entertainment; First Release Home Entertainment; Medusa Pictures; Prism Entertainment Corporation; Turner Home Video; Videosonic Arts
- Release date: June 1, 1995 (United States)
- Running time: 91 minutes
- Country: United States
- Language: English

Galaxis is a 1995 science fiction action film directed by William Mesa and written by Nick Davis. It stars Brigitte Nielsen, Richard Moll, and Craig Fairbrass. It was also released under the name Terminal Force.

== Plot summary ==
A mythical gem, created at the birth of the universe, generates energy for sustaining vitality. Kyla (Richard Moll) tries to find the object and use its inherent energy to increase his villainous sphere of influence. He successfully obtains the device after defeating its protectors on Sintaria. Meanwhile, Ladera (Brigitte Nielsen), a freedom fighter with the ability of invisibility, makes her way to Earth to seek out a sister gem to stalemate Kyla and prevent him from obtaining the object. Once there, she discovers Jed (John H. Brennan) has already retrieved the object from its secure location. However, Victor Menendez (Fred Asparagus) and his mercenaries also wish to own the device as recompense for monies Jed owes them. After dispatching Victor and his minions, Ladera bands together with Jed to seek out the first gem and thwart Kyla's plans.

== Cast ==
- Brigitte Nielsen as Ladera
- Richard Moll as Kyla
- John H. Brennan as Jed Sanders
- Roger Aaron Brown as Detective Carter
- Cindy Morgan as Detective Kelly
- Alan Fudge as Chief of Police
- Kristin Bauer van Straten as Commander
- Craig Fairbrass as Lord Tarkin
- Fred Asparagus as Victor Menendez
- Joey Gaynor as Stravos, Victor's Lieutenant
- Jeff Rector as Tray, Victor's Henchman
- Christopher Doyle as Seth, Victor's Henchman
- Michael Paul Chan as Manny Hopkins
- Richard Narita as Raymond, Manny's Nephew
- George Cheung as Eddie, Manny's Henchman
- Woon Young Park as Asian Henchman (uncredited)
- Jane Clark as Rape Victim
- Louisa Moritz as Bar Lady At Sharkey's
- Sam Raimi as Nervous Official
- Arthur Mesa as Robot Child

== Production ==
=== Filming ===
Galaxis was the feature film directorial debut for William Mesa. His prior credits included serving as visual effects supervisor for Under Siege and The Fugitive. The film is 91 minutes in duration. Filmmaker Sam Raimi made a cameo appearance in the movie.

=== Release ===
The film was released to VHS format for purchase in June 1995.

== Reception ==
The Houston Chronicle wrote a negative review, commenting: "Movies like this could give 'direct to video' a bad name." The review wrote that the action sequences were alright, and that the film probably suffered from its low budget and poor script. In The Sci-Fi Movie Guide, Chris Barasanti called it "derivative and joyless".

== Prequel ==
A prequel to the film was released as "The Survivor" in 1998, directed by Nick Davis, the screenwriter of the original. Richard Moll reprised his role as Kyla and Xavier Declie took over the role of Tarkin.

== See also ==
- Flash Film Works
- List of science fiction films of the 1990s
- Roman and Williams
