= Control-Vision =

Unreleased video game console

- Manufacturer: Axlon
- Type: Home video game console
- Generation: Third generation
- Released: 1989 (projected)
- Media: VHS tape, ROM cartridges

The Control-Vision (codenamed NEMO) is an unreleased video game console developed by Tom Zito. It is notable for using VHS tapes rather than ROM cartridges, prompting the creation of game content which survived on into much more advanced CD-ROM platforms.

== History ==
Originally codenamed "NEMO", initial development began in 1985 and was supported by Nolan Bushnell's company Axlon. The team, which included Apple Computer co-founder Steve Wozniak, created a prototype using a modified ColecoVision console to combine interactive images with a video stream transmitted through a cable. As a storage medium, NEMO employs VHS tapes that contain computer data alongside interleaved tracks of video and audio that can be toggled.

To take the project beyond prototype status, they searched for a partner who would fund further development. The Hasbro toy company agreed to invest $7 million in exchange for the video game rights to the technology.

Three short trial games were finished by the middle of 1986: Scene of the Crime, a four-minute interactive mystery; Bottom of the Ninth Inning, a baseball game; and an interactive music video for the song "You Might Think" by The Cars. The next step was the interactive movie Night Trap, inspired by Scene of the Crime, and filmed in December 1986 in Pawtucket, Rhode Island, the hometown of Hasbro. In 1987, Zito created the second full-size game named Sewer Shark, in one month's filming time and at a cost of $3 million.

After filming for Sewer Shark was completed, and two months prior to the 1989 release, Hasbro abandoned the project because the projected US$299 (equivalent to $780 in 2025) price was deemed uncompetitive against the well established and much cheaper Nintendo Entertainment System. Zito purchased the rights to the games and stored everything in a Rhode Island warehouse. In the late 1980s, Zito hired Mark Turmell, who would go on to create NBA Jam and Smash T.V., to develop two more interactive games, Citizen X, and a licensed tie-in game of Police Academy.

== Legacy ==
It was not until the early 1990s that the CD-ROM became an affordable mass storage medium for video game consoles, enabling full-motion video (FMV) games at home. Sega was looking for content for the 1992 introduction of the Sega CD accessory for the Genesis console. They contacted Zito, who created versions of Sewer Shark and Night Trap for Sega CD through his Digital Pictures company. Ports to other systems would soon follow.

Footage of a presentation of a NEMO prototype to Hasbro executives can be found in the Sega CD version of Night Trap when entering a cheat code. Lawrence H. Bernstein, working for Milton Bradley Company at that time, plays Scene of the Crime, the prototype of Night Trap. A playable version of Scene of the Crime can be found in Night Trap: 25th Anniversary Edition.

== Games ==
- Bottom of the Ninth Inning (1986)
- Night Trap (1986, known as Scene of the Crime)
- Sewer Shark (1987)
- Citizen X (1988)
- Police Academy (1988)

== See also ==
- Action Max, a VHS-based game console
- View-Master Interactive Vision, VHS based game console
