= Just the Ticket =

- VHS cover
- Directed by: Richard Wenk
- Written by: Richard Wenk
- Produced by: Andy García; Gary Lucchesi
- Starring: Andy García; Andie MacDowell
- Cinematography: Ellen Kuras
- Edited by: Christopher Cibelli
- Music by: Rick Marotta
- Production company: United Artists
- Distributed by: MGM Distribution Co.
- Release dates: February 1998 (AFM); February 26, 1999 (United States)
- Running time: 115 minutes
- Country: United States
- Language: English
- Budget: $12 million
- Box office: $430,404

Just the Ticket is a 1998 American drama film directed by Richard Wenk. It stars Andy García and Andie MacDowell. Garcia was also the producer. The film was originally titled A Piece of Cake.

== Plot ==
Gary Starke, desperate to get his girlfriend Linda back, goes to confession to seek guidance but doesn't get the help he seeks. He is a New York City ticket scalper who "works the street".

Linda won't take his calls, so Gary shows up at her sales job. He earns a dinner date with her by selling a 60-inch TV to someone who was only window shopping.

Gary plans to make one last big score: to win Linda back and straighten out his life. Believing his chance rests on an opportunity to scalp a large stack of tickets to see the Pope at Yankee Stadium. Gary comes up against 'Casino', a Florida scalper who undercuts him.

Meanwhile, at Linda's culinary course a New York Times food critic asks her to cater an upscale dinner party after trying her dish. So, instead of their date, Gary jumps in to help. She's way underpaid for the meal at the upperclass party, so they retaliate by ruining the dishes. That evening, they spend the night together.

The next day Gary is off seeking Pope tickets. He and the other scalpers get thrown in jail. While there, his scalper friends say that his lookout Benny Moran is unreliable, but he tells them Benny used to be in the corner for boxing champion Joe Frazier, and though they all had their money confiscated, Gary didn't because he hid his money in a tennis ball he'd been bouncing the entire time while talking to them, which he tells them was taught to him by Benny.

When Gary is released, he hurries to Linda's, only to meet Alan, an exterminator and her new boyfriend. He listens to advice from pregnant, ex drug addict 'Cyclops', to try to get a social security number. Unfortunately he can't without a birth certificate.

Gary finds Max offering 200 tickets for $5,000 if he can get it for Saturday. So he works hard scalping Broadway tickets. Caught by undercover cops, Casino helps out, warning that it's a one-time deal as it's his turf now and most everyone works for him.

Sitting opposite Linda's building, she comes out to tell Gary she's leaving for culinary school in Paris in three weeks. After some finagling, he buys the tickets to scalp, although warned about Max.

Linda's large family throws her a congratulatory party, a combined birthday and going away to culinary school celebration. Gary is warmly welcomed by everyone, and is quietly told she dumped the exterminator. They soon find out he has provided a film montage of loving moments between them.

Linda walks out mid-projection, with Gary following with a non-going away present, their trophy for best couple at a picnic. He again tries talking about his plans for them. Admitting she has loved him completely for years, but his many fantasies have never come through, so she needs to focus on the future.

In the city, Benny talks with Linda. He tells her that Gary has been intently working on something, and asks her to swear to do something for him. Then we see Gary in a realtor's office cutting a deal on a two-year lease. Afterwards, seeking out Benny, who was with his dog, he has passed.

At Benny's small funeral, Frazier comes to pay his respects, shocking the guys, as they hadn't believed he'd worked with him. Linda has also come, she tells Gary that Benny had asked her to promise to say yes to anything Gary asks. So he requests she be at an address at 9 a.m. on Monday.

Arriving home Gary finds Cyclops, who warns him that the tickets Max sold him were taken from a church, and the cops are looking for him. On the day of the Pope's address, dressed as a nun, Gary keeps the tickets and money in a hollowed out bible. Casino snitches on him, and although he transforms into a priest, he is caught. The evidence is lost in the scuffle.

As the scalping money is gone, Gary's not at the 9 a.m. appointment at the premises. An insurance rep appears on his doorstep instead with a $56,000 payment from Benny's life insurance policy as well as his own birth certificate he needed.

Gary sets up the lease, fully stocking it with dishes etc. Discovering Linda's at her mom's, he gets her to detour her airport taxi to the premises. Entering, she sees the signed lease and his social security card. Months later, we see the couple happily operating a thriving restaurant.

== Cast ==
- Andy Garcia as Gary Starke
- Andie MacDowell as Linda Palinski
- Richard Bradford as Benny Moran
- Alice Drummond as Lady With Cash
- Fred Asparagus as Zeus
- Louis Mustillo as Harry "The Head"
- Anita Elliott as Refund Lady At The Met
- Patrick Breen as Vinnie "San Diego Vinnie"
- Laura Harris as Alice / "Cyclops"
- Don Novello as Tony
- Ron Leibman as Barry "The Book"
- Michael Willis as TV Customer
- Jack Cafferty as Newscaster
- Molly Wenk as Fanny, Catholic Schoolgirl
- Daniella Garcia-Lorido as Lucy, Catholic Schoolgirl
- Abe Vigoda as Arty
- Andre B. Blake as "Casino"
- Michael P. Moran as Max "Fat Max"
- Ronald Guttman as Culinary Director
- Helen Carey as Mrs. Bennett, New York Times Food Critic
- Bobo Lewis as Mrs. Dolmatch
- Paunita Nichols as Rhonda
- Irene Worth as Mrs. Haywood
- Lenny Venito as Stanley
- Richard Wenk as Johnny "Good Call Johnny", D.J.
- George Palermo as Undercover Cop
- Anthony DeSando as Kenny Paliski
- Elizabeth Ashley as Mrs. Paliski
- Sully Boyar as Uncle Tony
- Joe Frazier as Himself
- Alfredo Álvarez Calderón as Yankee Stadium Security Chief
- Eugene Greytak as "The Pope" (credited as Gene Greytak)
- Bill Irwin as Ray Charles

== Reception ==
Just the Ticket was poorly received by critics. It holds a rating of 23% on Rotten Tomatoes from 13 reviews.

== See also ==
- Ticket resale
