= Fred Asparagus =

American comedian and actor

- Asparagus in Dragnet (1987)
- Born: Fred Reveles; June 10, 1947; Los Angeles County, California, U.S.
- Died: June 30, 1998 (aged 51); Panorama City, California, U.S.
- Occupations: Comedian, actor
- Spouse: Sandy Acord

Fred Asparagus (born Fred Reveles; June 10, 1947 – June 30, 1998) was an American actor and comedian. He was best known for playing the bartender in the 1986 film Three Amigos!.

Asparagus guest-starred in television programs including Roseanne, Who's the Boss?, Cheers, The John Larroquette Show, CHiPs, Falcon Crest, Something Wilder and Wiseguy, and also appeared in films, such as This Is Spinal Tap, Breakin' 2: Electric Boogaloo, The Five Heartbeats, Dragnet, Beverly Hills Cop III, Just the Ticket and Fatal Beauty.

Asparagus died on June 30, 1998 of a heart attack in Panorama City, California, at the age of 51.

== Filmography ==
=== Film ===
Year	Title	Role	Notes
1983	Surf II	Fat Boy #1	
1984	This Is Spinal Tap	Joe "Mama" Besser	
1984	Night Patrol	Fat Mexican	
1984	Breakin' 2: Electric Boogaloo	Hispanic Man	
1986	8 Million Ways to Die	Mundo	
1986	Three Amigos!	Bartender	
1987	Dragnet	Tito Provençal	
1987	Fatal Beauty	Delgadillo	
1987	Jonathan Winters: On the Ledge	Additional Improviser	TV movie
1988	Colors	Cook	
1989	Terminal Force		
1989	The Lords of Magick	Theatre Performer	
1990	Havana	Baby Hernadez	
1991	The Five Heartbeats	Big Red's Guys	
1994	Beverly Hills Cop III	Bobby	
1995	Galaxis	Victor Menendez	
1995	Steal Big Steal Little	Angel	
1996	The Class Cage	Waiter	
1998	Slappy and the Stinkers	Dockhand	
1998	Just the Ticket	Zeus	

=== Television ===
Year	Title	Role	Notes
1983	CHiPs	Weasel	1 episode
1987	Hunter	Max Santiago	1 episode
1988	Wiseguy	Willie Jesus	1 episode
1988	Cheers	Pepe	1 episode
1989	Falcon Crest	Chalo	3 episodes
1990	Who's the Boss?	Del Moore	1 episode
1993	Danger Theatre	Security Guard	1 episode
1994	The John Larroquette Show	Tarok	1 episode
1995	Something Wilder	Escobar	1 episode
1995	Land's End	Mr. Chavez	1 episode
1995	Roseanne	Jerry Garcia	1 episode
