= Quarterback Attack with Mike Ditka =

1995 video game

- North American Sega Saturn cover art
- Developer: Digital Pictures
- Publishers: Digital Pictures; Flash Filmworks (2016)
- Composer: Peter Bernstein
- Platforms: MS-DOS, Saturn, 3DO
- Release: MS-DOS, Saturn, 3DO: NA: 1995; Mobile: WW: 2016
- Genre: Sports
- Mode: Single-player

Quarterback Attack with Mike Ditka is a 1995 football video game published by Digital Pictures for the Sega Saturn, 3DO and MS-DOS. It features Mike Ditka as head coach of the player's team. Unlike in most football video games, the player does not control an entire team. Instead, Quarterback Attack attempts to simulate the experience of being a professional quarterback, with the other players rendered in full motion video (FMV). This break with convention divided critical response to the game.

The game was developed on a budget of two million dollars. The video footage was filmed over two weeks. When asked if it was difficult to call up his usual energy when working with a film crew instead of a real game-day situation, Mike Ditka said, "I've been called a lot of things, and being called 'an actor' has been one of them. It's not that hard to do, really."

Footage from the game was used in the film Game Over.

After Digital Pictures bankruptcy, the rights to several of their games were purchased by a consortium that included visual effects company Flash Film Works. In December 2016, Quarterback Attack was remastered from the original source video and released as an app for Google Play and iTunes.

== Reception ==
Reception

Review scores
Publication	Score
Electronic Gaming Monthly	7.25/10 (SAT)
Next Generation	3/5 (SAT)

The two sports reviewers of Electronic Gaming Monthly both praised the unique game concept and said that despite being FMV-based, the game is actually fun to play. A Next Generation critic agreed: "It's tempting to write this game off as another novelty FMV product, but when given the proper attention, this one might just surprise even the most die-hard of sports fans." He elaborated that the fast pace and smooth transitions between video clips enhance the feeling of being in a real football game. His one criticism was that the video quality is subpar by Saturn standards. Greasy Gus of GamePro also felt the game simulated the quarterback experience with a surprising amount of realism and interactivity, noting that "You do everything a real QB does: call the play and the cadence, study the defense at the line and adjust with audibles if necessary, dodge the rush, find your open man, and get your crosshair on him for a clean pass. You even have the option of eating the ball Steve Young-style and scrambling for some yards yourself." He found the graphics and sounds were both sufficient though not without problems, but concluded that many gamers would miss the comprehensive modes and options typical of football video games. Reviewing the 3DO version for the same magazine, Coach Kyle was even less forgiving of the game's novel concept; though he praised the video quality and humorous taunts, he focused most of his review lambasting the lack of football game conventions such as multiplayer modes, licensing, and the ability to control an entire team.
