= Prize Fighter (video game) =

1993 video game

- North American cover art
- Developer: Digital Pictures
- Publisher: Sega
- Director: Ron Stein
- Producers: Kevin Welsh; Charles J. D. Schlissel
- Designers: Kevin Welsh; Steve DeFrisco
- Programmer: Steve DeFrisco
- Writers: Laurie Frank; John Richardson
- Composer: Greg Hale Jones
- Platform: Sega CD
- Release: NA: 1993; PAL: March 1994
- Genre: Sports
- Mode: Single-player

Prize Fighter is a boxing video game developed by Digital Pictures and released by Sega for its Sega CD in 1993. Like other Digital Pictures titles, it is an interactive movie utilizing full motion video. All video footage during gameplay is in black and white. The game was directed by Ron Stein, who had previously worked as a fight coordinator for various films. Played entirely from a first-person perspective, the game casts players as an upstart boxer known as "The Kid", who must fight a series of opponents (played by Jimmy Nickerson, Manny Perry, Billy Lucas and Ben Bray) and win the championship. Prize Fighter was the pack-in game for the X'Eye, alongside two non-gaming software titles.

== Gameplay ==
The player is represented by the pair of gloves at the bottom of the video window. The health of the player and opponent are indicated by the face icons at the corners of the screen.

In the game, players take control of an up-and-coming boxer known as "The Kid." The entire game is played from a first-person perspective. As The Kid, players face four computer opponents: George "Honeyboy" Hernandez, "Mega" Joe Falco, T. Rex Hawkins and the champ, Nuke "the Duke" Johnson. During matches, players punch and block to defeat the opponent, each of whom has a different style. Between fights, cutscenes play in which The Kid is approached by various people from children with disabilities who look up to The Kid, to gangsters who want The Kid to intentionally lose the fight.

== Development ==
The developers spent five weeks on choreographing and training with the fighters prior to the actual filming.

== Reception ==
Electronic Gaming Monthly gave Prize Fighter a 6.2 out of 10, commenting that "For a first-person perspective fighting game, Prize Fighter fares very well with the black-and-white footage being incredibly effective". GamePro compared it favorably to the acclaimed boxing film Raging Bull and praised the responsive controls and realistic graphics.

Reviewer Shawn Sackenheim gave the title a positive retrospective review in Allgame. While admitting that playing the game was a matter of pattern memorization, he called it "a very challenging title requiring you to pick up on each of the boxers' styles and moves." and wrote "It's got enough challenge and appeal to last for months."
