= Manny Perry =

American stunt coordinator and stuntman

Manny Perry is an American stunt coordinator and stuntman. He has performed in dozens of films including Armageddon, Con Air, and The Mighty Ducks. He played the role of Big Jim Slade in Kentucky Fried Movie. He has also had acting roles as a policeman in the TV series 24 and a terrorist henchman in the Jean-Claude Van Damme movie Sudden Death.

== Selected filmography ==
- The Kentucky Fried Movie (1977) as Jim 'Big Jim' Slade (segments "Sex Record" & "Fistful of Yen")
- Cracking Up (1983) as Slavdriver
- Number One with a Bullet (1987) as Bodyguard At DeCosta's
- Terminal Exposure (1987) as Black Giant
- Who's Harry Crumb? (1989) as Cop In Car
- Marked for Death (1990) as Screwface's Jamaican Posse (uncredited)
- Predator 2 (1990) as King Willie Gang Member (uncredited)
- Out for Justice (1991) as King's Bouncer (uncredited)
- The Naked Gun 2½: The Smell of Fear (1991) as Jock #2
- The Last Boy Scout (1991) as Cigar Thug
- Stop! Or My Mom Will Shoot (1992) as Bad Guy
- American Me (1992) as Arthur J., Member of The Black Guerilla Family
- Nowhere to Run (1993) as Prisoner
- Loaded Weapon 1 (1993) as General Mortars Goon Squad (uncredited)
- Best of the Best II (1993) as Gunman In Desert
- True Lies (1994) as Bass Player (uncredited)
- Bad Boys (1995) as Drug Buyer Gunmen (uncredited)
- Panther (1995) as 'Shorty'
- Under Siege 2: Dark Territory (1995) as Mercenary (uncredited)
- Sudden Death (1995) as Brody
- Heat (1995) as Grocery Store Cop (uncredited)
- For Which He Stands (1996) as Cecil
- Fire Down Below (1997) as FBI Agent (uncredited)
- Rush Hour (1998) as Bartender
- Gun Shy (2000) as Cheemo's Bodyguard
- Collateral Damage (2002) as FBI Agent (uncredited)
- Eagle Eye (2008) as Sectran Courier
