= Jason Bourque =

Canadian screenwriter and director

- Born: Jason Christopher Bourque; 6 September 1972 (age 53); Vancouver, British Columbia, Canada
- Occupations: Film and television writer, director
- Years active: 1998–present

Jason Christopher Bourque (born 6 September 1972 in Vancouver, British Columbia) is a Canadian film and television writer and director.

== Career ==
Bourque has written and directed a wide variety of television movies, series, and documentaries, as well as over 60 commercials, short films, and music videos. In 2014, he directed the thriller film Black Fly, his feature film debut.
