= Flash Film Works =

American visual effects company

- Company type: Privately held company
- Industry: Visual effects, CGI animation
- Founded: 1993
- Headquarters: Hollywood, California, United States
- Key people: William Mesa; John Mesa; Emily Wallin; Jeremy Nelson; Lincoln Kupchak
- Number of employees: 50

Flash Film Works is a computer graphics company that provides visual effects for films, television shows and commercials. It is owned by director William Mesa and is located in Los Angeles, California.

== History ==
In 1993, Visual Effects Supervisor William Mesa left Introvision International to direct the low budget science fiction film Galaxis. To create the effects work for the film, Mesa formed his own effects company, which he dubbed Flash Film Works.

As an independent visual effects company, they were hired by New Line Cinema to work on Wes Craven's New Nightmare. This work led to them getting work on other films.

John Dykstra hired Flash Film Works for work on the Warner Brothers motion picture Batman and Robin, creating a digital matte painting of an ice-laden Gotham City, as well as performing some rig and wire removal work on the film.

For Tale of the Mummy, Flash Film works created 3-D mummy wrappings which unraveled and reformed into the mummy. Flash Film works also worked on the Adam Sandler comedy The Waterboy during this time as well as the Renny Harlin killer shark flick, Deep Blue Sea.

For the science fiction film, Red Planet, Flash Film works created various monitor display screens and interactive holographic monitors along with over 150 other shots for the film, including many wire removal shots to create the illusion of the actors floating in space.

In the year 2001, Flash Film works worked on the Eddie Murphy science fiction film The Adventures of Pluto Nash, creating computer generated Moonscapes for the actors to walk through.

For the Arnold Schwarzenegger action film Collateral Damage, Flash Film works was responsible for over 200 visual effects shots including creating CG Helicopters and debris, multiple rig and wire removal shots and several other types of shots as well.

For the Andy Davis directed film, Holes, based on the book by Louis Sachar, William Mesa was the visual effects supervisor as well as the Second Unit Director. For the film Flash Film works created and animated 3D lizards, designed and composited the "God's Thumb" mountain range and added desert and holes to many shots as well as considerable additional work.

Flash Film works big project for 2003 was the Edward Zwick directed film, The Last Samurai, starring Tom Cruise. Flash Film works performed around 200 effects shots on this film, including CG arrows, matte painting, compositing armies and face replacements.

Flash Film works created a CG Storm for several sequences in The Guardian and creating backgrounds for Blood Diamond. They later worked on Clash of the Titans and The Pacific.

Flash Film Works also acquired the rights to several video games originally produced by Digital Pictures and spearheaded having them remastered for newer game systems such as PlayStation 4 and Nintendo Switch.

== Selected visual effects filmography ==
- Wes Craven's New Nightmare (1994)
- Cutthroat Island (1995)
- Batman & Robin (1997)
- Tale of the Mummy (1998)
- Very Bad Things (1998)
- The Waterboy (1998)
- Deep Blue Sea (1999)
- Red Planet (2000)
- Collateral Damage (2002)
- Death to Smoochy (2002)
- The Adventures of Pluto Nash (2002)
- Birds of Prey (pilot) (2002)
- Holes (2003)
- The Last Samurai (2003)
- The Perfect Score (2004)
- White Chicks (2004)
- Ghost Whisperer (pilot) (2005)
- Dark Water (2005)
- Elizabethtown (2005)
- The Guardian (2006)
- Blood Diamond (2006)
- Defiance (2008)
- The Day the Earth Stood Still (2008)
- All About Steve (2009)
- The Pacific (2010)
- Clash of the Titans (2010)
- Dragon Age: Redemption (2011)
- Dolphin Tale (2011)
- Dolphin Tale 2 (2014)
- Against the Sun (2014)
- The Librarians (2014–15)
- Spy (2015)
- Barely Lethal (2015)
- Jack Reacher: Never Go Back (2016)
- Geostorm (2017)

== Awards ==
Flash Film Works won a number of Advertising Industry awards for its work on the series of Onstar television commercials which featured Batman driving the Onstar-equipped Batmobile.

Flash Film Works won the Visual Effects Society Award for "Best Supporting Visual Effects" for its work on the motion picture The Last Samurai in 2004. In 2010 they won two VES Awards for The Pacific for "Outstanding Visual Effects in a Broadcast Mini-Series, Movie or Special" and for "Outstanding Compositing in a Broadcast Series or Commercial."

Flash Film Works in 2010 won a Primetime Emmy Award for its Visual Effects work on the HBO mini-series, The Pacific.
