= Sega CD =

Video game console add-on

Sega CD / Mega-CD

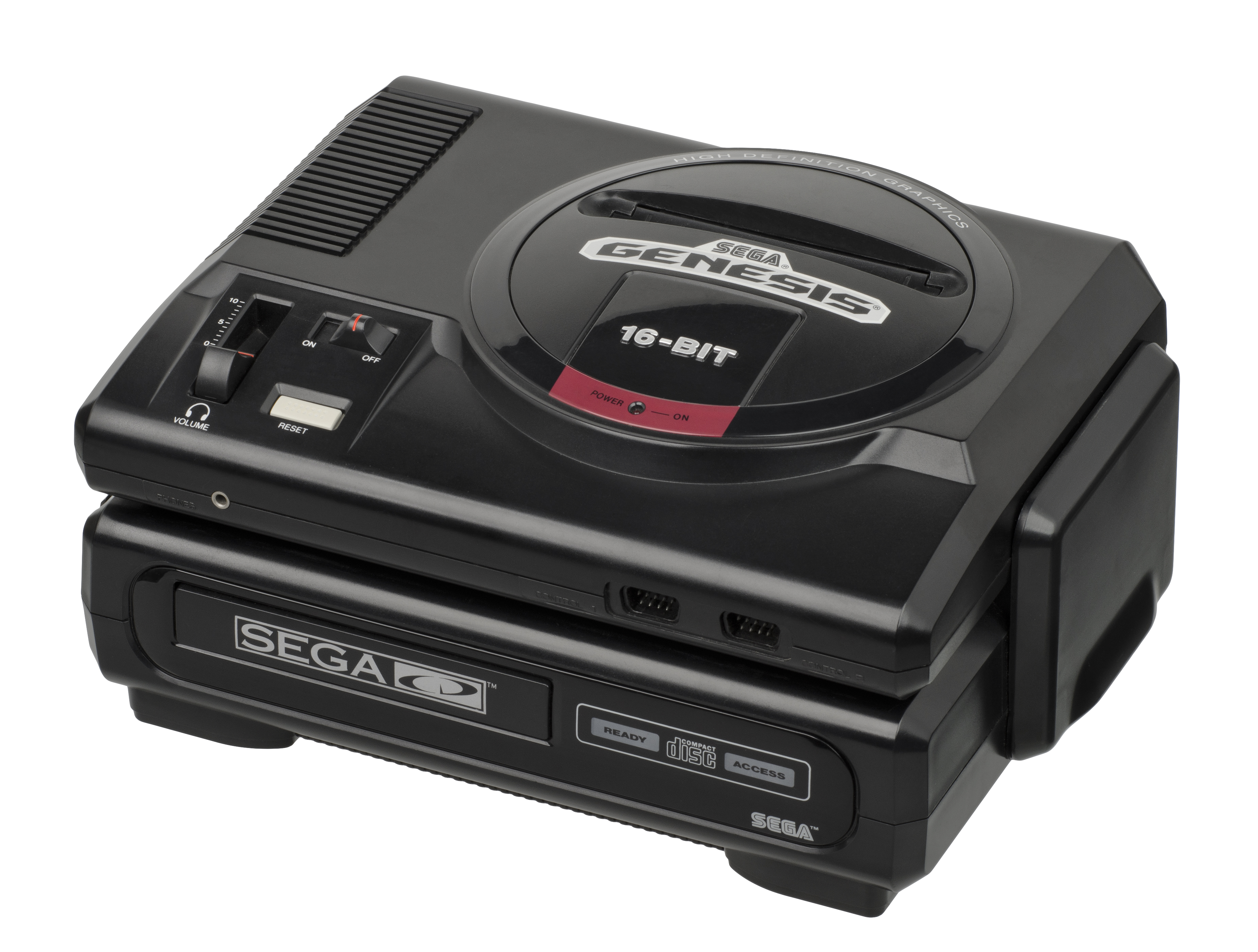
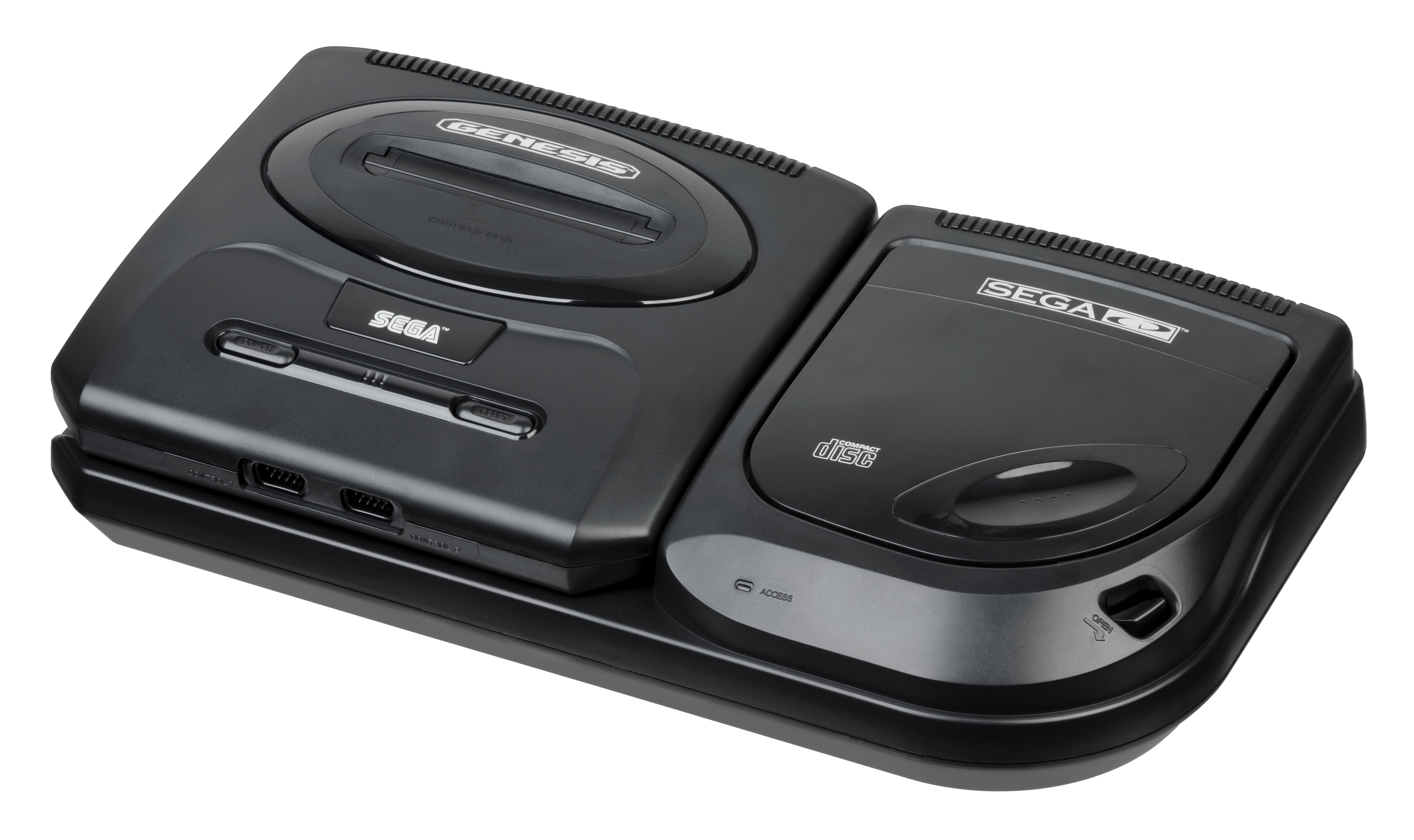
- Top: Model 1 Sega CD (bottom) attached to a Model 1 Genesis Bottom: Model 2 Sega CD (on right) attached to a Model 2 Genesis
- Also known as: Mega-CD (most regions outside North America and Brazil)
- Developer: Sega
- Manufacturer: Sega
- Type: Video game console add-on
- Generation: Fourth
- Released: JP: December 12, 1991; NA: October 15, 1992; AU: March 1993; UK: April 2, 1993; EU: April 1993; BR: October 1993
- Lifespan: 1991–1996
- Introductory price: JP¥49,800; US$299; £270
- Discontinued: 1996
- Units sold: 2.24 million
- Media: CD-ROM, CD+G
- CPU: Motorola 68000 @ 12.5 MHz
- Storage: 6.5 Mbit RAM (programs, pictures, and sounds), 128 kbit RAM (CD-ROM cache), 64 kbit RAM (backup memory)
- Graphics: custom ASIC
- Sound: Ricoh RF5C164
- Best-selling game: Sonic CD, 1.5 million
- Related: 32X

The Sega CD, known as Mega-CD (Note: Japanese: メガCD(シーディー), Hepburn: Mega Shī Dī) in most regions outside North America and Brazil, is a CD-ROM peripheral and format for the Sega Genesis produced by Sega as part of the fourth generation of video game consoles. Originally released in Japan on December 12, 1991, it came to North America on October 15, 1992, and the rest of the world in 1993. The Sega CD plays CD-based games and adds hardware functionality such as a faster CPU and a custom graphics chip for enhanced sprite scaling and rotation. It can also play audio CDs and CD+G discs.

Sega sought to match the capabilities of the competing PC Engine CD-ROM² System, and partnered with JVC to design the Sega CD. Sega refused to consult with their American division until the project was complete, fearful of leaks. The Sega CD was redesigned several times by Sega and was also licensed to third parties, including Pioneer and Aiwa who released home audio products with Sega CD gaming capability. The main benefit of CD technology at the time was greater storage; CDs offered approximately 160 times more space than Genesis/Mega Drive cartridges. This benefit manifested as full-motion video (FMV) games such as the controversial Night Trap.

The Sega CD game library features acclaimed games such as Sonic CD, Lunar: The Silver Star, Lunar: Eternal Blue, Popful Mail, and Snatcher, but also many Genesis ports and poorly received FMV games. Only 2.24 million Sega CD units were sold, after which Sega discontinued it to focus on the Sega Saturn. Retrospective reception has been mixed, with praise for some games and functions, but criticism for its lack of deep games and its high price. Sega's poor support for the Sega CD has been criticized as the beginning of the devaluation of its brand.

== History ==
=== Background ===
Released in 1988, the Genesis (known as the Mega Drive in most territories outside of North America) was Sega's entry into the fourth generation of video game consoles. In the early 1990s, Sega of America CEO Tom Kalinske helped make the Genesis a success by cutting the price, developing games for the American market with a new American team, continuing aggressive advertising campaigns, and selling Sonic the Hedgehog with the Genesis as a pack-in game.

By the early 1990s, compact discs (CDs) were making headway as a storage medium for music and video games. NEC had been the first to use CD technology in a video game console with their PC Engine CD-ROM² System add-on in October 1988 in Japan (launched in North America as the TurboGrafx-CD the following year), which sold 80,000 units in six months. That year, Nintendo announced a partnership with Sony to develop a CD-ROM peripheral for the Super Nintendo Entertainment System (SNES). Commodore International released their CD-based CDTV multimedia system in early 1991, while the CD-i from Philips arrived later that year. According to Nick Thorpe of Retro Gamer, Sega would have received criticism from investors and observers had it not developed a CD-ROM game system.

=== Development ===
Shortly after the release of the Genesis, Sega's Consumer Products Research and Development Labs, led by manager Tomio Takami, were tasked with creating a CD-ROM add-on. It was originally intended to equal the capabilities of the TurboGrafx-CD, but with twice as much random-access memory (RAM). In addition to relatively short loading times, Takami's team planned to implement hardware scaling and rotation similar to that of Sega's arcade games, which required a dedicated digital signal processor. A custom graphics chip would implement these features, alongside an additional sound chip manufactured by Ricoh. According to Kalinske, Sega was ambitious about what CD-ROM technology would do for video games, with its potential for "movie graphics", "rock and roll concert sound" and 3D animation.

However, two major changes were made towards the end of development that dramatically raised the price of the add-on. Because the Genesis' Motorola 68000 CPU was too slow to handle the Sega CD's new graphical capabilities, an additional 68000 CPU was incorporated. This second CPU has a clock speed of 12.5 MHz, faster than the 7.67 MHz CPU in the Genesis. Responding to rumors that NEC planned a memory upgrade to bring the TurboGrafx-CD RAM from 0.5 Mbit to between 2 and 4 Mbit, Sega increased the Sega CD's available RAM from 1 to 6.5 Mbit. This proved to be a technical challenge, since the Sega CD's RAM access speed was initially too slow to run programs effectively, and the developers had to focus on increasing the speed. The estimated cost of the device rose to US$370, but market research convinced Sega executives that consumers would be willing to pay more for a state-of-the-art machine. Sega partnered with JVC, which had been working with Warner New Media to develop a CD player under the CD+G standard.

Sega of America was not informed of the project details until mid-1991. Despite being provided with preliminary technical documents earlier in the year, the American division was not given a functioning unit to test. According to former executive producer Michael Latham: "When you work at a multinational company, there are things that go well and there are things that don't. They didn't want to send us working Sega CD units. They wanted to send us dummies and not send us the working CD units until the last minute because they were concerned about what we would do with it and if it would leak out. It was very frustrating."

Latham and Sega of America vice president of licensing Shinobu Toyoda assembled a functioning Sega CD by acquiring a ROM for the system and installing it in a dummy unit. The American staff were frustrated by the Sega CD's construction. Former senior producer Scot Bayless said: "[It] was designed with a cheap, consumer-grade audio CD drive, not a CD-ROM. Quite late in the run-up to launch, the quality assurance teams started running into severe problems with many of the units—and when I say severe, I mean units literally bursting into flames. We worked around the clock, trying to catch the failure in-progress, and after about a week we finally realized what was happening." He said the problems were caused by certain games excessively seeking to different tracks on the disc, leading to overheating of the motors which repositioned the laser head assembly.

=== Launch ===
As early as 1990, magazines were covering a CD-ROM expansion for the Genesis. Sega announced the release of the Mega-CD in Japan for late 1991, and North America (as the Sega CD) in 1992. It was unveiled to the public at the 1991 Tokyo Toy Show, to positive reception from critics, and at the Consumer Electronic Show in Chicago in mid-1991. It was released in Japan on December 12, 1991, initially retailing at JP¥49,800. Though the Mega-CD sold quickly, the small install base of the Mega Drive in Japan meant that sales declined rapidly. Within its first three months, the Mega-CD sold 200,000 units, but only sold an additional 200,000 over the next three years. Third-party game development suffered because Sega took a long time to release software development kits. Other factors affecting sales included the high launch price of the Mega-CD in Japan and only two games available at launch, with only five published by Sega within the first year.

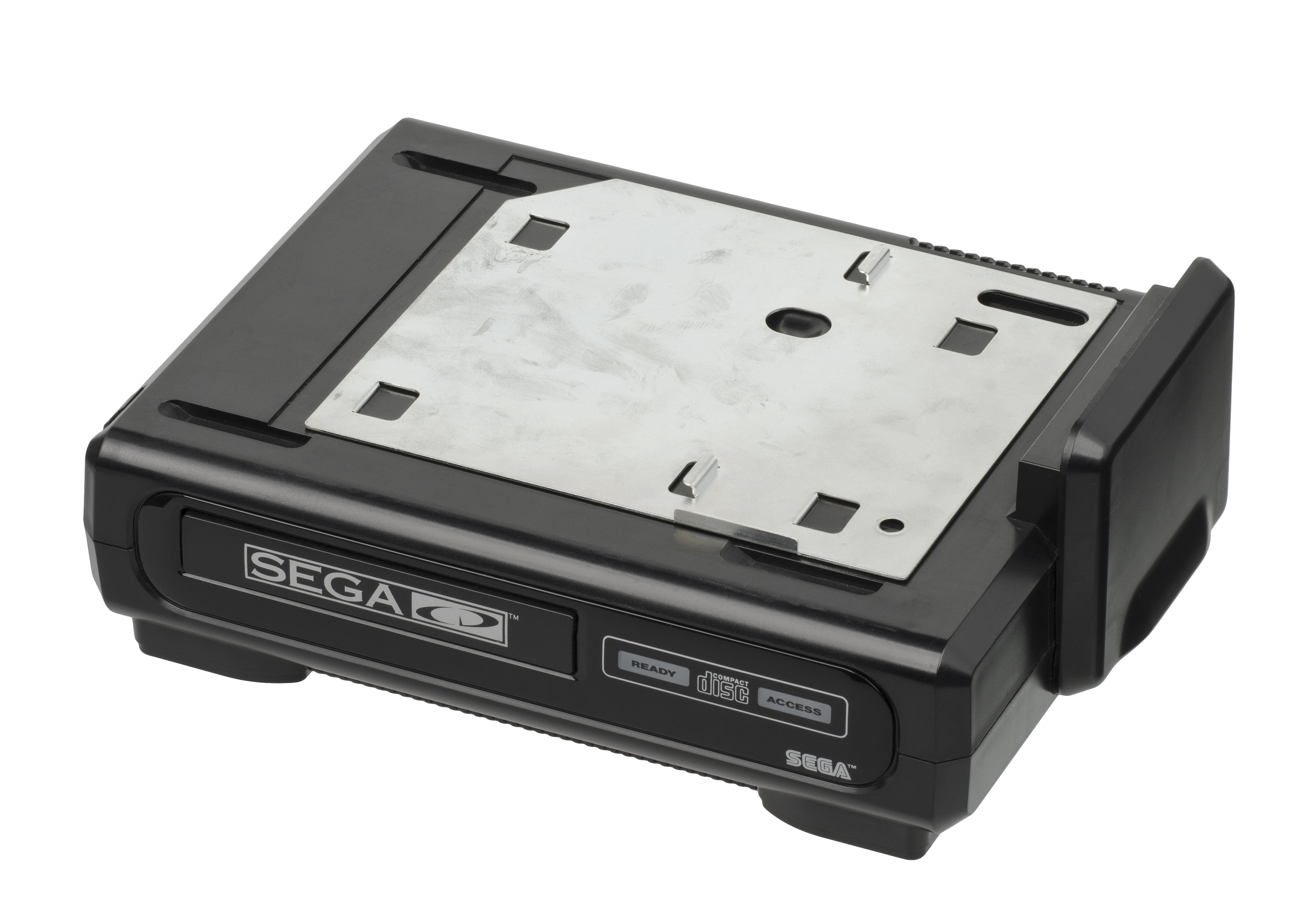
A Model 1 Sega CD without a Genesis attached. The steel joining plate was included to act as RF shielding between the CD and console hardware.

On October 15, 1992, the Mega-CD was released in North America as the Sega CD, with a retail price of US$299. Advertising included one of Sega's slogans, "Welcome to the Next Level". Though only 50,000 units were available at launch due to production problems, the Sega CD sold over 200,000 units by the end of 1992 and 300,000 by July 1993. As part of Sega's sales, Blockbuster purchased Sega CD units for rental in their stores. Sega of America emphasized that the Sega CD's additional storage space allowed for full-motion video (FMV), with Digital Pictures becoming an important partner. After the initial competition between Sega and Nintendo to develop a CD-based add-on, Nintendo canceled development of a CD add-on for the SNES after having partnered with Sony and then Philips to develop one.

The Mega-CD was launched in Europe in April 1993, starting with the United Kingdom on April 2, 1993, at a price of £269.99. The European version was packaged with Sol-Feace and Cobra Command in a two-disc set, along with a compilation CD of five Mega Drive games. Only 70,000 units were initially available in the UK, but 60,000 units were sold by August 1993. The Mega-CD was released in Australia in March 1993. Brazilian toy company Tectoy released the Sega CD in Brazil in October 1993, retaining the North American name despite the use of the name Mega Drive for the base console there.

Sega released a second model, the Sega CD 2 (Mega-CD 2), on April 23, 1993, in Japan. It was released in North America several months later at a price of US$229, bundled with one of the bestselling Sega CD games, Sewer Shark. Designed to bring down the manufacturing costs of the Sega CD, the newer model is smaller and does not use a motorized disc tray. A limited number of games were developed that used the Sega CD and another Genesis add-on, the 32X, released in November 1994.

=== Night Trap controversy ===
On December 9, 1993, the United States Congress began hearings on video game violence and the marketing of violent video games to children. The Sega CD game Night Trap, an FMV adventure game by Digital Pictures, was at the center of debate. Night Trap had been brought to the attention of United States Senator Joe Lieberman, who said: "It ends with this attack scene on this woman in lingerie, in her bathroom. I know that the creator of the game said it was all meant to be a satire of Dracula; nonetheless, I thought it sent out the wrong message." Lieberman's research concluded that the average video game player was between seven and twelve years old, and that video game publishers were marketing violence to children.

In the United Kingdom, Night Trap was discussed in Parliament. Former Sega Europe development director Mike Brogan noted that Night Trap brought Sega publicity, and helped reinforce Sega's image as an "edgy company with attitude". Despite the increased sales, Sega recalled Night Trap and rereleased it with revisions in 1994. Following the congressional hearings, Sega and other video game manufacturers came together in 1994 to establish a unified rating system under the Entertainment Software Rating Board.

=== Decline ===
By the end of 1993, sales of the Sega CD had stalled in Japan and were slowing in North America. In Europe, sales of Mega-CD games were outpaced by games for the Amiga CD32. Newer CD-based consoles such as the 3DO Interactive Multiplayer rendered the Sega CD technically obsolete, reducing public interest. In late 1993, less than a year after the Sega CD had launched in North America and Europe, the media reported that Sega was no longer accepting in-house development proposals for the Mega-CD in Japan. By 1994, 1.5 million units had been sold in the United States and 415,000 in Western Europe. Kalinske blamed the Sega CD's high price for limiting its potential market; Sega attempted to add value in the US and the UK by bundling more games, with some packages including up to five games.

In early 1995, Sega shifted its focus to the Sega Saturn and discontinued advertising for Genesis hardware, including the Sega CD. Sega discontinued the Sega CD in the first quarter of 1996, saying that it needed to concentrate on fewer platforms and that the Sega CD could not compete due to its high price and outdated single-speed drive. According to Thorpe, the Sega CD only reached a more popular price point in 1995, by which time customers were willing to wait for newer consoles. The last scheduled Sega CD games, ports of Myst and Brain Dead 13, were cancelled. 2.24 million Sega CD units were sold worldwide.

== Technical specifications ==
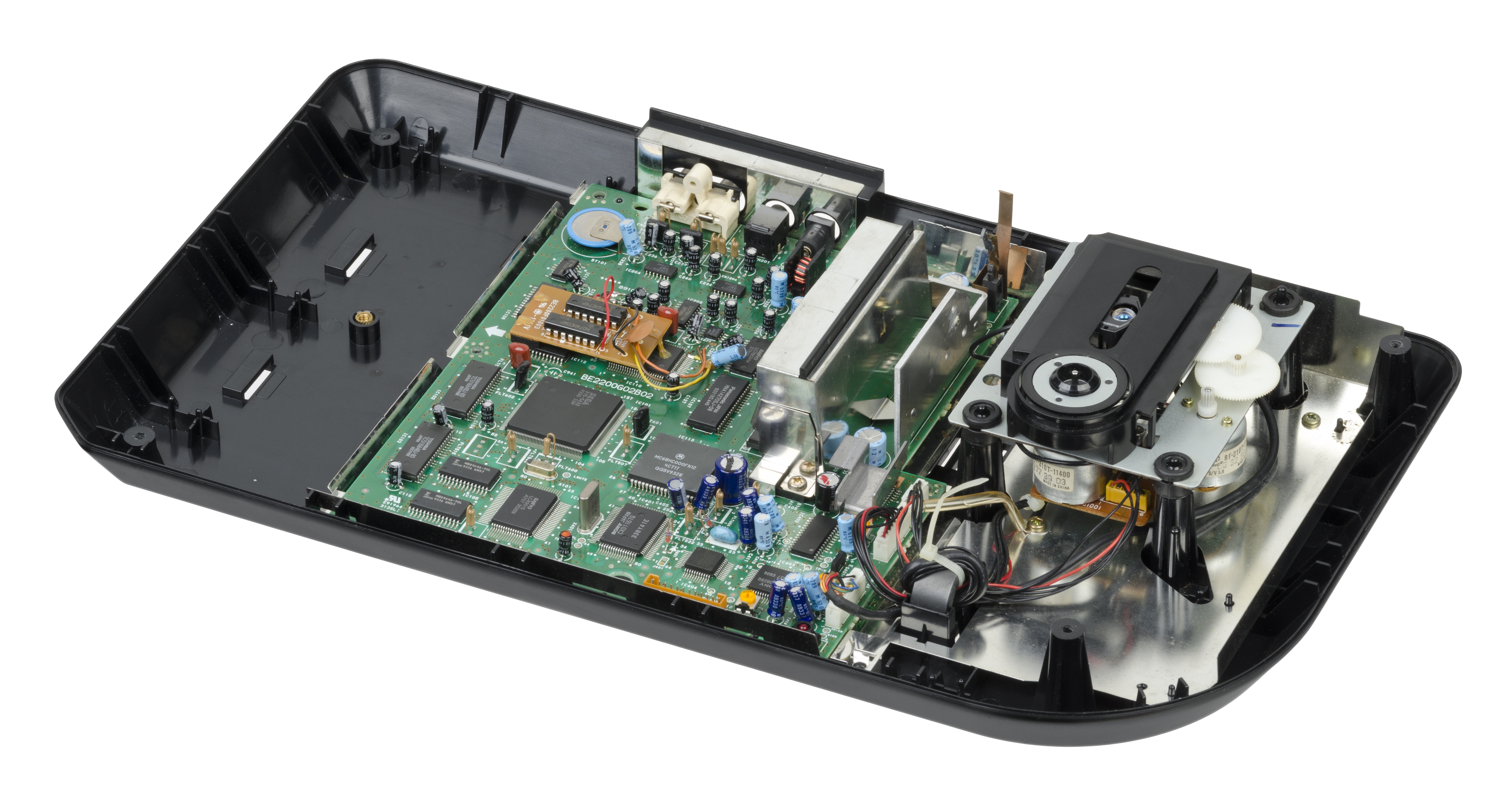
The motherboard and CD laser assembly of a Model 2 Sega CD

The Sega CD can only be used in conjunction with a Genesis system, attaching through an expansion slot on the side of the main console. It requires its own power supply. A core feature of the Sega CD is the increase in data storage by its games being CD-ROMs; whereas ROM cartridges of the day typically contained 8 to 16 megabits of data, a CD-ROM disc can hold more than 640 megabytes of data, more than 320 times the storage of a Genesis cartridge. This increase in storage allows the Sega CD to play FMV games. In addition to playing its own library of games in CD-ROM format, the Sega CD can also play compact discs and karaoke CD+G discs, and can be used in conjunction with the 32X to play 32-bit games that use both add-ons. The second model, also known as the Sega CD 2, includes a steel joining plate to be screwed into the bottom of the Genesis and an extension spacer to work with the original Genesis model.

The main CPU of the Sega CD is a 12.5 MHz 16-bit Motorola 68000 processor, which runs 5 MHz faster than the Genesis processor. It contains 1 Mbit of boot ROM, allocated for the CD game BIOS, CD player software, and compatibility with CD+G discs. 6.5 Mbit of RAM is allocated to data for programs, pictures, and sounds; 128 Kbit to CD-ROM data cache memory; and an additional 64 Kbit is allocated as the backup memory. Additional backup memory in the form of a 1 Mbit Backup RAM Cartridge was also available as a separate purchase, released near the end of the system's life. The graphics chip is a custom ASIC, and can perform similarly to the SNES's Mode 7, but with the ability to handle more objects at the same time. Audio is supplied through the Ricoh RF5C164, and two RCA pin jacks allow the Sega CD to output stereophonic sound separate from the Genesis. Combining stereo sound from a Genesis to either version of the Sega CD requires a cable between the Genesis's headphone jack and an input jack on the back of the CD unit. This is not required for the second model of the Genesis. Sega released an additional accessory to be used with the Sega CD for karaoke, including a microphone input and various sound controls.

== Models ==
Genesis and Sega CD (Model 1)	Genesis and Sega CD (Model 2)	Genesis CDX
Victor Wondermega RG-M1	Victor Wondermega RG-M2	Pioneer LaserActive

Several models of the Sega CD were released. The original model used a front-loading motorized disc tray and sat underneath the Genesis. The second model was redesigned to sit next to the Genesis and featured a top-loading disc tray. Sega also released the Genesis CDX (Multi-Mega in Europe), a combined Genesis and Sega CD, with additional functionality as a portable CD player.

Three additional system models were created by other electronics companies. Working with Sega, JVC released the Wondermega, a combination of the Genesis and Sega CD with high-quality audio, on April 1, 1992, in Japan. The Wondermega was redesigned by JVC and released as the X'Eye in North America in September 1994. Its high price kept it out of the hands of average consumers. Another console, the LaserActive by Pioneer Corporation, can play Genesis and Sega CD games if equipped with the Mega-LD attachment developed by Sega. The LaserActive was positioned to compete with the 3DO Interactive Multiplayer, but the combined system and Mega-LD pack retailed at too expensive a price for most consumers. Aiwa released the CSD-GM1, a combination Mega Drive and Mega CD unit built into a boombox. The CSD-GM1 was released in Japan in 1994.

== Games ==
Sonic CD's special stage uses the Sega CD's enhanced graphical capabilities.

The Sega CD supports a library of more than 200 games created by Sega and third-party publishers. Six Sega CD games were also released in versions that used both the Sega CD and 32X add-ons.

Well regarded Sega CD games include Sonic CD, Lunar: The Silver Star, Lunar: Eternal Blue, Popful Mail, and Snatcher, as well as the controversial Night Trap. Although Sega created Streets of Rage for the Genesis to compete against the SNES port of the arcade hit Final Fight, the Sega CD received an enhanced version of Final Fight that has been praised for its greater faithfulness to the arcade original. Eternal Champions: Challenge from the Dark Side was noted for its impressive use of the Sega CD hardware as well as its violent content. In particular, Sonic CD garnered acclaim for its graphics and time travel gameplay, which improved upon the traditional Sonic formula. The Sega CD also received enhanced ports of Genesis games including Batman Returns and Ecco the Dolphin.

The Sega CD library includes several FMV games, such as Night Trap, Dragon's Lair and Space Ace. FMV quality was substandard on the Sega CD due to poor video compression software and limited color palette, and the concept never caught on with the public. According to Digital Pictures founder Tom Zito, the Sega CD's limited color palette created "a horrible grainy look". Likewise, most Genesis ports for the Sega CD featured additional FMV sequences, extra levels, and enhanced audio, but were otherwise identical to their Genesis release. The video quality in these sequences has been criticized as comparable to an old VHS tape.

Given a large number of FMV games and Genesis ports, the Sega CD's game library has been criticized for its lack of depth. Kalinske felt this was a valid criticism, and that while it was useful for releasing collections of games, "just doing cartridge games on a CD-ROM was not a step forward". According to Thorpe, the Sega CD's games did not display enough advancement to justify the console price for most consumers. He felt that FMV games, targeted toward more casual players, were not enough to satisfy hardcore players.

== Reception and legacy ==
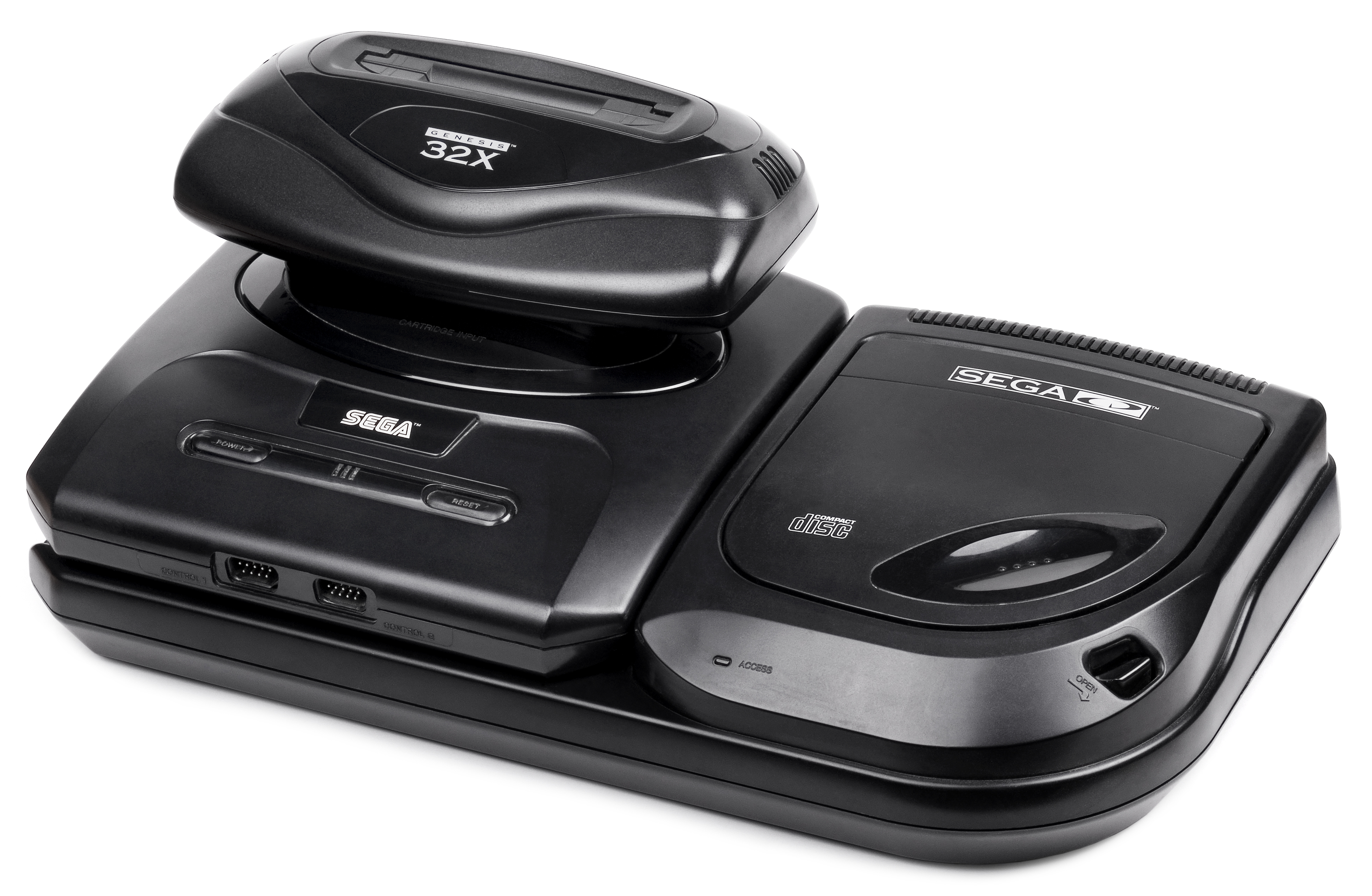
A Model 2 Sega CD with a Model 2 Genesis and a 32X attached. Each device requires its own power supply.

Near the time of its release, the Sega CD was awarded Best New Peripheral of 1992 by Electronic Gaming Monthly. Four separate reviews scored the add-on 8, 9, 8, and 8 out of 10; reviewers cited its upgrades to the Genesis as well as its high-quality and expanding library of games. In 1995, four Electronic Gaming Monthly reviewers scored it 5 out of 10, citing its limited game library and substandard video quality. GamePro cited the same problems, noting that many games were simple ports of cartridge games with minimal enhancements; GamePro concluded that the Sega CD was merely "a big memory device with CD sound" rather than a meaningful upgrade. They gave it a "thumbs sideways" and recommended that Genesis fans buy an SNES before considering a Sega CD. In a special Game Machine Cross Review in May 1995, Famicom Tsūshin scored the Japanese Mega-CD 2 17 out of 40.

Retrospective reception of the Sega CD has been mixed, praising certain games but criticizing its value for money and limited upgrades over Genesis. According to GamePro, the Sega CD is the seventh-lowest-selling console; reviewer Blake Snow wrote: "The problem was threefold: the device was expensive at $299, it arrived late in the 16-bit life cycle, and it didn't do much (if anything) to enhance the gameplay experience." However, Snow felt that the Sega CD had the greatest Sonic game in Sonic CD. IGN's Levi Buchanan criticized Sega's implementation of CD technology, arguing that it offered no new gameplay concepts. Jeremy Parish of USgamer wrote that Sega was not the only company of the period to "muddy its waters" with a CD add-on, and highlighted some "gems" for the system, but that "the benefits offered by the Sega CD had to be balanced against the fact that the add-on more than doubled the price (and complexity) of the [Genesis]." In a separate article for 1Up.com, Parish praised the Sega CD's expansion of value to the Genesis. Writing for Retro Gamer, Damien McFerran cited various reasons for the Sega CD's limited sales, including its price, lack of significant enhancement to the Genesis, and the fact that it was not a standalone console. Retro Gamer writer Aaron Birch, defended the Sega CD as "ahead of its time" and said that game developers had failed to meet the potential of CD technology.

Sega's poor support for the Sega CD has been criticized as the first step in the devaluation of the Sega brand. Writing for IGN, Buchanan said the Sega CD, released without a strong library of games, "looked like a strange, desperate move—something designed to nab some ink but without any real, thought-out strategy. Genesis owners that invested in the add-on were sorely disappointed, which undoubtedly helped sour the non-diehards on the brand." In GamePro, Snow wrote that the Sega CD was the first of several poorly supported Sega systems, which damaged the value of the brand and ultimately led to Sega's exit from the hardware market. Thorpe wrote that, while it was possible for Sega to have brushed off the Sega CD's failure, the failure of the Sega CD and the 32X together damaged faith in Sega's support for its platforms.

Former Sega of America senior producer Scot Bayless attributes the unsuccessful market to a lack of direction from Sega with the add-on. According to Bayless, "It was a fundamental paradigm shift with almost no thought given to consequences. I honestly don't think anyone at Sega asked the most important question: 'Why?' There's a rule I developed during my time as an engineer in the military aviation business: never fall in love with your tech. I think that's where the Mega-CD went off the rails. The whole company fell in love with the idea without ever really asking how it would affect the games you made." Sega of America producer Michael Latham said he "loved" the Sega CD, and that it had been damaged by an abundance of "Hollywood interactive film games" instead of using it to make "just plain great video games". Former Sega Europe president Nick Alexander said: "The Mega CD was interesting but probably misconceived and was seen very much as the interim product it was." Kalinske said that the Sega CD had been an important learning experience for Sega for programming for discs, and that it was not a mistake but not "as dramatically different as it needed to be".

== See also ==
- 64DD
- Atari Jaguar CD
- Family Computer Disk System
