= List of cancelled Sega CD games =

The Sega CD is an add-on to the Sega Genesis video game console. It never established much of a userbase, which resulted in a multitude of cancelled games. Early in its lifespan, many upgraded Sega Genesis ports were cancelled, while later in its lifespan, game development was cancelled in favor of moving games to the Sega 32X, Sega Saturn, or even Sony's original PlayStation console. This list documents games that were confirmed for release for the Sega CD at some point, but did not end up being released for it.

== Games ==
There are currently 76 games on this list. (Note: This number is always up to date by this script.)

List of cancelled Sega CD games
Title(s)	Notes/Reasons	Developer	Publisher
Akira	An adaptation of the 1988 anime film Akira was planned for release on Sega Genesis, SNES and Sega CD in 1995, with Game Boy and Game Gear games based on the film also being considered. Gameplay and content varied wildly among versions, but disagreements in the direction of the games with THQ occurred and the game fell onto the backburner, never releasing for any system.	Hand Made Software	THQ
Alien 3	A version of the multiplatform 1992 game was announced for the Sega CD, featuring the gameplay of the Sega Genesis version with clips from the Alien 3 film due to the extra storage of the CD-ROM format. The Sega CD version was featured at CES 1993, but never released.	Probe Software	Acclaim Entertainment
Alien Trilogy	Development of the game originally started on the Sega CD and Sega 32X, and even had a release date of November 1994 at one point, but development was eventually moved to the more powerful platforms of the Sega Saturn and PlayStation 1, where it eventually released in 1996.	Probe Software	Acclaim Entertainment
AV-8B Harrier Assault	The 1992 PC game was announced to have versions created for the Sega CD, SNES, and 3DO for 1994, though only the 3DO version ever materialized (under the name Flying Nightmares).	Simis	Domark
Baby Boom	One of a few games proposed by Sega to publish games that would appeal more to females, the game entailed controlling a hand that would move babies out of harm's way. The game was announced for the Sega CD, Genesis and Game Gear, but never released in any capacity. According to developer Ed Annunziata, the game was cancelled because the moving of the hand cursor was not fun with a d-pad controller.	Sega	Sega
Brain Dead 13	A FMV game released for most disc-based game and PC platforms active across 1995 and 1996, a Sega CD version was advertised, but the only version to never materialized, with its release date falling around the end of the Sega CD's lifespan.	ReadySoft	ReadySoft
Bubba 'N' Stix	A Sega CD version of the 1993 Sega Genesis release was scheduled for 1994, but never materialized.	Core Design	Core Design
Burning Fists: Force Striker	A fighting game similar to Street Fighter 2 developed by Sega for the Sega CD, the game was scheduled for release in 1994 but was cancelled for undisclosed reasons at roughly 80% completion. Two prototype builds, alpha and beta, were sold on eBay in 2005, and the rights were eventually gained by indie publisher Good Deal Games, a company known for purchasing and releasing unlicensed version of old prototypes after the death of video game platform, which they later did in 2006.	Sega	Sega
Chaos Control	A Sega CD version was announced, but only the CD-i, Sega Saturn, PlayStation 1, and PC versions ever released.	Infogrames	Infogrames
Citizen X	A side scrolling game similar to the early Prince of Persia, the game was cancelled during the lifespan of the Sega CD, but later released well after its lifespan as a "beta" by indie publisher Good Deal Games, a company known for purchasing and releasing unlicensed versions of old prototypes after the death of video game platform.	Digital Pictures	Digital Pictures
Cool World	A number of video game adaptions of the Cool World film were released to promote the film. A Sega CD version was announced, but only the NES, SNES, Game Boy, and PC versions ever released.	Sega	Sega
Cyberwar	A story sequel to the film The Lawnmower Man and its respective video game adaption, the game was announced for Sega CD, 32X, and Sega Saturn, and the 3DO Interactive Multiplayer, but only ever released on PlayStation 1 and PC platforms.		Sales Curve Interactive
Dark Ride	Announced as a FMV game that played like a "psychedelic roller coaster" strategy game played from the first person perspective, it was announced for Sega CD, 32X, and later shifted development to the Sega Saturn, but never ended up releasing on any platform.	Rocket Science Games	Rocket Science Games
Dark Seed	A Sega CD version of the PC game was advertised for release, but never materialized, though versions for Sega Saturn and PlayStation 1 eventually released years later.	Cyberdreams	Vic Tokai
Dark Seed II	Much like the original Dark Seed, a Sega CD port was announced, never materialized, but later arrived for the Sega Saturn and PlayStation 1 years later instead.	Cyberdreams	Cyberdreams
Discworld	A video game adaption of the novel Discworld, a Sega CD version was advertised in 1995, but only PC, Sega Saturn, and PlayStation 1 versions ever materialized across 1995 and 1996.	Perfect Entertainment	Psygnosis
Disney's Aladdin (Sega Genesis)	While never officially announced, a deep dive into the Sega Genesis's versions source code by the Video Game History Foundation in 2017 found evidence through design documents that a Sega CD version with additional levels was in development, but never released.	Virgin Games	Sega
Dragon Lore: The Legend Begins	Released on PC platforms in 1994, ports to the Sega CD and 3DO Interactive Multiplayer were announced for 1995, but only the 3DO version ever materialized.	Cryo Interactive	The Software Toolworks
Dragon's Lair II: Time Warp	A Sega CD version was advertised in promotional fliers, but like many proposed console ports announced for the game, never materialized.	Digital Leisure	ReadySoft
DynoBlaze/Dinoblades	A beat em up game announced for the Sega CD, Sega Genesis, and SNES, about dinosaurs that wear rollerblades and play street hockey. Scheduled for a late 1995 release, but never materialized in any capacity.	Bonsai Entertainment	Virgin Interactive Entertainment
The Excellent Dizzy Collection	A collection of three entries from the Dizzy series of games — Panic Dizzy (1990), Dizzy the Adventurer (1991), and the previously unreleased Go! Dizzy Go! — was scheduled for release in 1994. Despite being announced for the Genesis, Sega CD, Master System, and Game Gear, only the Game Gear version ever materialized.	Interactive Studios	Codemasters
The Exterminators	Announced as The Exterminators at CES 1994, the game never released for the Sega CD during its lifespan. Well after the platform's 1996 discontinuation, indie publisher Good Deal Games gained the right to the game and released an unlicensed prototype version of the game as Bug Blasters: The Exterminators in 2000. The game was a rail shooter played over the background of a Full-motion video.	Digital Pictures	Sony Imagesoft
Grandia	After developing Lunar: The Silver Star and Lunar: Eternal Blue for the Sega CD, Game Arts decided to start work on a new JRPG, Grandia for the platform. However, with the discontinuation of the Sega CD, development shifted to the Sega Saturn, where it was released in 1997 in Japan, and the original PlayStation, where it released worldwide across 1999 and 2000.	Game Arts	Entertainment Software Publishing
Hardcore/Ultracore	A game in development for the Sega CD and Sega Genesis and scheduled for release in 1994, its release was cancelled when publisher Psygnosis changed it focus to the then-upcoming original PlayStation. While never released during the Genesis or Sega CD's actual lifespan, the game was later revisited and finished in the late 2010s, and released under the name Ultracore for the Mega Sg, Nintendo Switch, PlayStation 4, and PlayStation Vita platforms across 2019 and 2020.	Digital Illusions	Psygnosis
Hudson Soft's Soccer / Virtual Soccer 2	After the success of Mega Bomberman (1994), Hudson Soft announced their intention to develop more titles for Sega platforms. One of which was a sequel to the SNES title Virtual Soccer (1994). It was scheduled for release very late in the Sega CD's lifespan - March 1995 - but never materialized.	Hudson Soft	Hudson Soft
The Humans	Released for Sega Genesis, SNES Game Boy, and Atari Jaguar, and a number of PC platforms in the early 1990s, Sega CD and Game Gear versions were announced as well. The Sega CD was reportedly very similar to the Genesis version, but neither other Sega version ever materialized.	Imagitec Design	GameTek
Hunters of the Ralk	Announced as an RPG designed by Dungeons & Dragons creator Gary Gygax for the Sega CD, the game never released on any platforms.		Cyberdreams
I Have No Mouth and I Must Scream	Early in development, a Sega CD version was reported to be in development, though it was not widely publicized, and only versions for various PC platforms ever released.	Cyberdreams	
The Incredible Machine	A Sega CD version of the 1993 PC game was mentioned as an upcoming project in mid-1993, but never materialized.	Dynamix	Dynamix
Indiana Jones and the Fate of Atlantis	A port of the 1992/1993 PC releases was announced for the Sega CD, but was cancelled after their previous title, The Secret of Monkey Island (1993), failed to perform well on the Sega CD.	LucasArts	JVC Musical Industries
Instruments of Chaos starring Young Indiana Jones	Originally planned for both the Sega CD and the Sega Genesis, only the Genesis version ever materialized. The poor state of the Sega CD market was thought to be the cause of the cancellation.		Sega
Jet Ski Rage	A game that involved racing jet skis and fighting opponents from the first person perspective. Subsequently, in development for the Sega CD, 32x, and Sega Saturn, it never ended up releasing for any platform.	Velocity Software	
Johnny Mnemonic	A video game adaption of the film of the same name, ports of the released PC version were scheduled for the Sega CD and the original PlayStation, but neither materialized.	Sony Imagesoft	Sony Imagesoft
Journey to the Center of the Earth	A video game adaption of the television series of the same name announced for the Sega CD, Game Gear, SNES, NES and Game Boy. While multiple adaptions released in the 1980s and 2000s, none of the proposed versions of the 1990s, Sega CD included, ever released.		Sony Imagesoft
King's Quest V	A port of the 1990 PC game was announced for the Sega CD, present at CES 1993, and scheduled for released in early 1993, but never materialized.	Sierra Entertainment	Sega
Last Action Hero	Released for the Sega Genesis, SNES, and Amiga computers, a Sega CD version based on the latter enhanced version was in development, and was going to incorporate footage from its respective film, but the Sega CD version never materialized.	Bits Corporation	Sony Imagesoft
Leisure Suit Larry in the Land of the Lounge Lizards	A Sega CD version of the 1987 computer game was announced and scheduled for a March 1993 release, but never materialized.	Sierra On-Line	Sierra On-Line
Lost Eden	French video game magazine Joypad reported that a Sega CD version of the game was in development alongside the 3DO, CD-i, and PC versions, but the Sega version never materialized.	Cryo Interactive	Virgin Interactive Entertainment
The Lost Vikings	The developers worked on an expanded edition of the Sega Genesis version of the 1993 multiplatform game for the Sega CD, that would have included extra levels and gameplay aspects the developers believed only possible on the Sega CD hardware, but this version never released.	Silicon & Synapse	Virgin Games
Morphs: Flashback 2	Never officially announced, but later revealed by development team member Thierry Levastre well after the fact, shortly after the release of Flashback in 1992, the development team started work on a similar sequel titled Morphs: Flashback 2 for the Sega CD. Work on the game spanned 3–4 months, however, the project was put on hold while they focused on finishing Shaq Fu (1994). By the time they returned to the project, the Sega CD was no longer seen as a viable platform, so it was scrapped in favor of restarting on the more powerful PlayStation 1, which turned into the 3D shooter Fade to Black (1995).	Delphine Software International	
Mr. Tuff	Announced for the Sega CD, Sega Genesis, and SNES, as a platformer with a difficulty level. The game followed "Mr. Tuff", a robot left behind to demolish the earth and its malfunctioning robots after humans have escaped to a new planet. The Sega CD version was reported to have improved graphics beyond the other two version. Despite being close to completion and scheduled for a late 1994 release, no version of the game ever released.	Sales Curve	
Myst	A port of the 1993 PC game was announced for the Sega CD and Sega Saturn, though only the Saturn version ever materialized, despite the Sega CD version being far enough along to be reviewed by video game magazines.	Cyan Worlds	Sunsoft
No Escape	A video game adaption of the 1994 film of the same name announced for the Sega CD, Sega Genesis, and SNES. While the Genesis and SNES versions released in the second half of 1994 as planned, the Sega CD version was cancelled as publisher Sony Imagesoft pulled support from the Sega CD platform.	Bits Corporation	Sony Imagesoft
Peaky Blinder	A side-scrolling game involving the player controlling "Peaky", a literal amalgamation and personification of garbage, which aspires to overcome his life in the slums to become a respectable person in a nice house. The game featured a shapeshifting gameplay mechanic for fighting enemies. Announced for a wide variety of platforms - SNES, Game Boy, Game Gear, Sega CD, and the Sega Genesis, the game never released in any capacity for any platforms.		Sales Curve Interactive
Penn & Teller's Smoke and Mirrors	Similar to the video Penn & Teller's Cruel Tricks for Dear Friends (1987), the game was to be centered around mini-games where the player could cheat and deceive their friends. The game was far enough along in its development for the Sega CD for review copies to be distributed to multiple magazines, but its release was cancelled when publisher Absolute Entertainment abruptly went bankrupt and the developers were unable to find another publisher willing to publish the game for the Sega CD due to its poor market status by 1995. One of the review copies leaked onto the internet in 2005 and the game found a cult following for its off-beat gameplay ideas.	Imagineering	Absolute Entertainment
Phantasy Star IV: The End of the Millennium	The game started development as a Sega CD game, but the platform's poor sales lead Sega to rework it for the Sega Genesis instead, where it released in 1993.	Sega	Sega
Police Quest III: The Kindred	A port of the 1991 PC game was announced for Sega CD, but never materlized.	Sierra On-Line	Sierra On-Line
Pop'n Land	A platformer with shoot em up elements, where the player would customize the main character's head, body, and weapon, which in turn affected their attributes and attacks. Over 4,000 combinations were said to be possible. The game was far enough along to have a review copy be reviewed by Japanese publication Beep! MegaDrive - who gave it 7/10, 5/10, 4/10, and 5/10 scores across their four reviewers - but they game was never released in any capacity.	Takeru	Sur Dé Wave
Power Drift	A port of the arcade game Power Drift was reported to be in development subsequently for the Sega Genesis, Sega CD, and Sega 32X, but none ever materialized. Ports later arrived on the Sega Saturn and Sega Dreamcast instead.	Sega AM2	Sega
Power Modeling	A game involving virtually building Revell and Monogram model cars and then racing them. In development exclusively for the Sega CD, and was present at CES 1993, but never released.	Revell, Monogram	
R.B.I. Baseball 4	The fourth entry in the R.B.I. Baseball series of baseball games was announced for the Sega CD, but only ever ended up releasing for the Sega Genesis.	Tengen	Tengen
R.B.I. Baseball '95	The eighth entry in the R.B.I. Baseball series of baseball games was announced for the Sega CD and the Sega 32X at CES 1995, but only ever ended up releasing for the 32X.	Time Warner Interactive	Time Warner Interactive
Return to Zork	A Sega CD version of the 1993 PC game was announced at CES 1994 and scheduled for release the following year, but only Sega Saturn and PlayStation 1 versions would release in the years to follow.	Activision	Infocom
Rise of the Robots	A Sega CD version of the multiplatform fighting game was announced, and scheduled for release on the platform into 1995, but never materialized.	Data Design Interactive	JVC Musical Industries
Robo Aleste 2 (Dennin Aleste 2)	A sequel to the original Robo Aleste (1992) was announced for the Sega CD, and some character art was shown, but it never released in any capacity.	Compile	Compile
Rocket Boy	An isometric action platformer game with pre-rendered 3D graphics in the vein of SegaSonic the Hedgehog (1993) and Sonic 3D Blast (1996), following a boy and his dog navigating a hostile alien planet. Originally in development for the Sega CD, the developer's lack of commercial success in releasing games for the platform lead for development to be moved to the Sega 32X and later the Sega Saturn before its ultimate cancellation. Prior to its cancellation, it had been scheduled for a late 1995 release on the Saturn, but the game had been put on hold due to its developers feeling it was too similar to other games they observed at CES 1995. They later closed down entirely in 1997.	Rocket Science Games	Rocket Science Games
Second Samurai	Originally released for the Amiga in 1993, Sega Genesis and Sega CD versions were announced to release alongside each other the following year, though only the Genesis version ever materialized.	Vivid Image	Sega
Sid & Al's Incredible Toons	A Sega CD version of the 1993 PC game was scheduled for release in October 1994, but never materialized.	Dynamix	Dynamix
Side Pocket	A Sega CD iteration of the Side Pocket series of pool games was promoted in the Electronic Gaming Monthly' 1995 buyers guide, but the game itself never released on the platform.	Data East	Data East
Sister Sonic	A Sonic the Hedgehog-branded reinterpretation of Popful Mail that would have starred a female family relative of Sonic's. Due to negative feedback from fans in Japan, its Japanese release was canceled in favor of a version of Popful Mail with no Sonic the Hedgehog ties. Plans to release Sister Sonic overseas remained for a while, but were eventually scrapped.	Sega Falcom	Sega
Sonic the Hedgehog	An early plan for a Sonic the Hedgehog title for the Sega CD began as an enhanced port of the original Sonic the Hedgehog (1991), but the plan was dropped when development morphed into its own separate game, which eventually released as Sonic CD (1993).	Sonic Team	Sega
Sonic the Hedgehog 2	An early plan for a Sonic the Hedgehog title for the Sega CD began as an enhanced port of Sonic the Hedgehog 2 (1992), but the plan was dropped when development morphed into its own separate game, which eventually released as Sonic CD (1993).	Sonic Team	Sega
Space Pirates	Originally released as a live-action arcade game in 1992, versions for PC, 3DO, and Sega CD were announced, though the Sega CD version never materialized.	American Laser Games	American Laser Games
Space Quest IV: Roger Wilco and the Time Rippers	A Sega CD version of the 1993 PC release was announced, and previewed by magazines, but never materialized.	Sierra On-Line	Sierra On-Line
Star Strike	A FMV game with a plot about fighting against an aggressive alien race that obtains all of a human's knowledge once they eat their brain. Gameplay largely consisted of simple shooting segments in between story segments. The game was cancelled during the lifespan of the Sega CD, but later finished and given an unofficial after-market release well outside of its lifespan in 2007.	Stargate Ent.	Sony Imagesoft
Star Trek: The Next Generation: Echoes from the Past	In 1994, versions of the game were planned for the Sega Genesis, SNES, Atari Jaguar, and Sega CD, though only the Genesis and SNES version ever released later that year.	MicroProse	Sega
Stellar 7	A remake of the 1983 PC game was announced for PC platforms and the Sega CD in the early 1990s, though the Sega CD version never materialized.	Sierra On-Line	Sierra On-Line
{{sort|Strangers|The Strangers	A fighting game based on the Malibu Comics series The Strangers was in development, but was cancelled.	Malibu Interactive	Malibu Interactive
Striker	While developing an iteration of the Striker soccer video games for the Sega Genesis, developers Rage Software discussed plans to develop enhanced versions for other Sega platforms, including a Sega CD version that used the increased storage space of its CD-ROM to store data for over 200,000 different soccer teams, and a Sega 32X version that used its stronger hardware for improved graphics. However, the Genesis version was the only one which ended up releasing on Sega platforms, and future Sega Saturn and Dreamcast version were completely different games.	Rage Software	Sega
Super Off Road: The Baja / Ivan Stewart's Super Off Road Baja 1000	A sequel to Super Off Road (1989) was announced for the SNES, Sega Genesis, and Sega CD. While the SNES version released in 1993, neither Sega version ever materialized.		Williams Entertainment
Super Strike Trilogy	A three game compilation of the first three Strike games - Desert Strike (1992), Jungle Strike (1993), and Urban Strike (1994) - was announced for the Sega CD at E3 1995, but the game never materialized.	Electronic Arts	Electronic Arts
Terminator 2: The Arcade Game	The 1991 arcade game was ported to a variety of 8-bit and 16-bit platforms. A Sega CD version was announced, but never released.	Probe Software	Acclaim Entertainment
Timecop	An enhanced Sega CD version of the 1995 SNES release, with additional cutscenes and higher quality music, was announced, but never released. The game featured a lengthy development period, and the Sega CD was relatively inactive with game releases by 1995.	Cryo Interactive	JVC Musical Industries
Total Carnage	Console ports of the 1992 arcade game were announced for the early and mid 1990s. Sega CD and Sega Genesis versions were announced, and far enough along to be previewed by magazines, but neither Sega versions ever released.	Malibu Games	THQ
World Cup Golf: Hyatt Dorado Beach	A Sega CD version of the multi-platform gold game was announced, but never materialized.	Arc Developments	U.S. Gold
Ys IV: Mask of the Sun	A port of the 1993 SNES release was one of a number of titles announced as part of a short-lived alliance between Sega and Nihon Falcom that never materialized.	Sega Falcom	Sega
