= Mr. Tuff =

- Developer: Sales Curve Interactive
- Publisher: The Retro Room
- Producer: Sean Kelly
- Designer: Ned Langman
- Programmer: John Croudy
- Artists: Dennis Gustafsson; Ned Langman
- Composers: Allister Brimble; Steve Blenkinsopp
- Platform: Super Nintendo Entertainment System
- Release: WW: October 2023
- Genres: Action, platform
- Modes: Single-player, multiplayer

Mr. Tuff is an action-platform video game developed by Sales Curve Interactive (SCi) for the Super Nintendo Entertainment System. Originally planned for a 1994 release, it was canceled until it was published by The Retro Room in 2023. Set in a future where humanity abandoned the Earth and migrated to the planet Utopia, military androids took over and enslaved the stranded domestic robots. The player controls a demolition robot named Mr. Tuff across six islands, exploring and searching each level for items and power-ups, while fighting enemies and defeating bosses.

Mr. Tuff was conceived for SCi by Darren Melbourne, based on a character named Mr. Max E. Tuff which later became Mr. Tuff. It was produced by Sean Kelly and designed by Ned Langman, who had worked on Hades Nebula and SWIV (1991), while the music was scored by Allister Brimble and Steve Blenkinsopp. The game was first announced in 1993 and shown at the 1994 ECTS Spring, and was intended to be published by Ocean Software in North America and Europe, and Sony Electronic Publishing in Australia. When it was ready, Ocean ran into financial difficulties and waived the cost of manufacturing the cartridges but paid SCi for its development.

Because Mr. Tuff was never published, SCi transferred the rights to Melbourne and Langman in the hope of publishing it in the future. In 2023, it was licensed and released by The Retro Room, a publishing company owned by developer John Roo. The game garnered an average critical reception prior to cancellation; most reviewers felt divided regarding its graphics, soundtrack, difficulty, and gameplay, while criticism was geared towards aspects such as the timed levels, lack of original ideas, and short length.

== Gameplay ==
Gameplay screenshot

Mr. Tuff is an action-platform game similar to Chuck Rock. The plot takes place in 2008; many years ago, human researchers discovered a habitable Earth-like planet and called it Utopia. When Earth becomes uninhabitable due to rampant pollution, humanity boards a fleet of spaceships and sets off for Utopia, leaving behind only household robots. The robots established a new society, however, six military androids quickly took power and set themselves up as rulers. The androids decided to take six islands as their domains and the robots became their slaves and servants. A demolition robot named Mr. Tuff decided to rebel against the totalitarian regime and free the robots.

The player controls Mr. Tuff throughout six areas divided into multiple buildings that correspond to a level, where the main objective of each is to destroy a predetermined number of targets within a given time limit to open the exit and advance to the next level. Each building can be played in any order and after each one is destroyed, the player must confront a boss before moving into the next area. There is also a secret island that can only be accessed by finding 30 coins hidden in bonus rooms on each level. The player must maneuver Mr. Tuff by jumping across ledges and fighting enemies, exploring and searching for items and power-ups, while also collecting stars scattered around the levels.

Mr. Tuff can be equipped with accessories for his fists, as well as backpacks and helmets with weapons. These range from drills, fire, jet packs, lasers, missile launchers, saw blades and yo-yos. Mr. Tuff can also hop into vehicles to navigate the level and fight enemies like wrecking trucks, hoverboards, submarines, and tanks. Each vehicle has its own energy bar, but they cannot be taken to another level unlike weapons. The player can access an in-game shop, where various items can be purchased using stars as currency, including a "lucky dip", a checkpoint, extra lives, and a password to resume progress. In addition, the game also has a multiplayer option which allows two players to play by alternating turns, where the second player assume the role of Mr. Firm.

== Development and release ==
Mr. Tuff was created by Sales Curve Interactive (SCi), a British game developer and publisher founded by former Telecomsoft executive Jane Cavanagh in 1988. SCi had previously worked on conversions for Amiga and Atari ST such as The Ninja Warriors (1987) and Silkworm, as well as SWIV (1991). SCi also published titles for the Super Nintendo Entertainment System under the Storm label like Super SWIV, Troddlers, and Time Slip (1993). It was conceived for SCi by Darren Melbourne, based on a character named Mr. Max E. Tuff who later became Mr. Tuff. The game was produced by Sean Kelly and designed by Ned Langman, who had worked on Hades Nebula and SWIV. Langman also acted as graphic artist alongside Dennis Gustafsson, who drew art for the introduction and the main character. John Croudy served as the game's sole programmer, while the soundtrack was composed by Allister Brimble and Steve Blenkinsopp.

Mr. Tuff was first announced in 1993 and showcased at the 1994 ECTS Spring, planning for an autumn release date. The title was intended to be published by Ocean Software in North America and Europe, and Sony Electronic Publishing in Australia. However, when it was ready, Ocean ran into financial difficulties and paid SCi for its development, but waived the cost of manufacturing the cartridges and having Nintendo publish it. Versions for the Sega Mega Drive and Mega-CD were also planned but never released. Due to never being published, SCi transferred the rights of the game to Melbourne and Langman, and they hoped to release it in the future. Between 2007 and 2022, two prototype ROM images were leaked online. In October 2023, the game was licensed and released by The Retro Room, a publishing company owned by developer John Roo.

== Reception ==
Reception

Review scores
Publication	Score
GameFan	81.66% (Note: GameFan's review was by three critics with different ratings: 79%, 79%, and 87%.)
GamesMaster	48%
HobbyConsolas	85/100
M! Games	51%
Mega Fun	60%
Superjuegos	85/100
Super Play	74%
Total!	60/100 (UK); 3 (DE)
Video Games (DE)	63%
Nintendo Acción	85/100
Play Time	61%
Super Gamer	86/100

Mr. Tuff garnered average reception from critics before its cancellation. GameFan's three reviewers commended the detailed graphics and gameplay, but expressed mixed thoughts regarding the soundtrack and saw its timed levels as the only shortcoming. They also drew similarities with Mega Man due to the game's array of weapon power-ups and thematic. Mega Fun's Markus Appel opined that the main character controlled well, and saw the weapon selection and hidden bonus rooms appealing, but felt some of the stages were short and easy in contrast to the bosses. Video Games' Wolfgang Schaedle gave favorable commentary for its animated sprites, and found the levels to be varied but felt the game seemed shallow, noting that original ideas rarely came into play.

MAN!AC's Oliver Ehrle called it an unimaginative platformer, citing the lack of a fresh idea in the game. Play Time's Ulf Schneider gave it average remarks towards its audiovisual presentation and fun factor. GamesMaster's Les Ellis criticized the game for its bland levels, uninspired sprites, soundscapes, and frustrating gameplay. HobbyConsolas' Antonio Caravaca found Mr. Tuff to be an entertaining game and highlighted its visuals, as well as the variety of weapons and vehicles on each level. Super Gamer's three writers praised the game's overall graphical department, audio, and gameplay, but noted the short length and faulted its repetitive levels, low difficulty, and lack of a two-player simultaneous mode.

Total!'s Josse and Atko commended the game's storyline and difficulty progression, but criticized its visuals, audio department, and derivative gameplay. They considered Mr. Tuff to be an unremarkable and below-average platformer. Writing for the German edition, Michael Anton gave the game positive remarks for its smooth graphics and cheerful music. Nintendo Acción's Javier Abad labelled it as an entertaining title, praising the musical variety, sound effects, and gameplay, but found the graphics childish and poorly detailed. Superjuegos' Roberto Serrano celebrated the game's settings for each level and fun gameplay, but saw the simple design of some enemies, repetitive music, the technical quality of certain sound effects, and high difficulty of later levels as negative points.
