= FireHawk (video game) =

1991 video game

- Developer: Codemasters
- Publisher: Camerica
- Designer: Oliver Twins
- Platforms: NES, Atari ST, Amiga
- Release: September 1991
- Genre: Shoot 'em up
- Mode: Single-player

FireHawk is a 1991 shoot 'em up video game developed by Codemasters and published by Camerica for the Nintendo Entertainment System.

The player character is commissioned by the President of the United States to stop the trafficking of drugs into the United States. The player flies an Apache helicopter to different places around the world and must destroy the drug traffickers' factories.

The game is very similar to Desert Strike and the rest of the Strike series, and nearly identical to Raid on Bungeling Bay, which was released for the Commodore 64 in 1984 as well as the Nintendo Entertainment System and MSX computers in 1985. In 1993, an unrelated action game Firehawk (Super Nintendo) was shown by Sony.

In 1992 it was released by Codemasters in Europe for the Nintendo Entertainment System (cartridge and Aladdin Deck Enhancer), Atari ST and Amiga.
