= Jungle Strike =

1993 video game

- MS-DOS cover art
- Developers: High Score Productions; Granite Bay Software (Note: Ported to Amiga by Hyperial Software, to Game Gear by Unexpected Development, to MS-DOS by Speedlink Communications and Gremlin Interactive, and to SNES by Gremlin Interactive.)
- Publishers: Electronic Arts; Ocean Software (Amiga); Black Pearl Software (Game Boy, Game Gear); Gremlin Interactive (MS-DOS)
- Producers: Scott Berfield; Susan Manley
- Designers: John Manley; Tony Barnes
- Composer: Brian Schmidt
- Series: Strike
- Platforms: Sega Genesis, MS-DOS, Amiga, CD32, Super NES, Game Gear, Game Boy, PlayStation Portable (Note: Jungle Strike was released in 2006 for the title EA Replay; Desert Strike was also released in this compilation.)
- Release: 1993: Genesis; 1994: Amiga, CD32; 1995: SNES, MS-DOS, Game Boy, Game Gear
- Genre: Shoot 'em up
- Mode: Single-player

Jungle Strike (Note: Subtitled The Sequel to Desert Strike, or Jungle Strike: Uketsugareta Kyouki (ジャングルストライク 受け継がれた狂気) in Japan.) is a video game developed and published by Electronic Arts in 1993 for the Sega Genesis. The game was later released for the Super NES and an enhanced version for MS-DOS. A 1994 Amiga version was developed by Ocean Software, the Super NES and MS-DOS versions developed by Gremlin Interactive, and portable console versions by Black Pearl Software. It is the direct sequel to Desert Strike (a best-seller released the previous year) and is the second installment in the Strike series. The game is a helicopter-based shoot 'em up, mixing action and strategy. The plot concerns two villains intent on destroying Washington, D.C. The player must use the helicopter and occasionally other vehicles to thwart their plans.

Its game engine was carried over from an unsuccessful attempt at a flight simulator and was inspired by Matchbox toys and Choplifter. Jungle Strike retained its predecessor's core mechanics and expanded on the model with additional vehicles and settings. The game was well received by most critics upon release. Publications praised its gameplay, strategy, design, controls and graphics.

== Plot ==
Jungle Strike features two antagonists: Ibn Kilbaba, the son of Desert Strike's antagonist, and Carlos Ortega, a notorious South American drug lord. The opening sequence depicts the two men observing a nuclear explosion on a deserted island, while discussing the delivery of "nuclear resources" and an attack on Washington D.C. Kilbaba seeks revenge for his father's death at the hands of the US, while Ortega wishes to "teach the Yankees to stay out of my drug trade".

The player takes control of a "lone special forces" pilot. The first level depicts the protagonist repelling terrorist attacks on Washington, D.C., including the President's limousine. Subsequent levels depict counter-attacks on the drug lord's forces, progressing towards his "jungle fortress". In the penultimate level, the player pursues Kilbaba and Ortega to their respective hideouts before capturing them.

The final level takes place in Washington, D.C. again, where the two antagonists attempt to flee after escaping from prison. The player must eliminate both Kilbaba and Ortega and stop four trucks carrying nuclear bombs from blowing up the White House. The PC version also extends the storyline with an extra level in Alaska, where the player must wipe out the remainder of Ortega's forces under the command of a Russian defector named Ptofski, who has taken control of oil tankers and is threatening to destroy the ecosystem with crude oil if his demands are not met. Once all levels are complete, the ending sequence begins and depicts the protagonist and his co-pilot in an open-topped car in front of cheering crowds.

== Gameplay ==
The player's helicopter engages enemy soldiers and enemy anti-aircraft guns to recapture the stealth jet

Jungle Strike is a helicopter-based shoot 'em up, mixing action and strategy. The player's primary weapon is a Comanche attack helicopter. Additional vehicles that can be operated include a motorbike, a hovercraft and an F-117. The latter in particular features variable height and unlimited ammunition, but is more vulnerable to crashes. The game features an "overhead" perspective "with a slight 3D twist". The graphics uses a 2.5D perspective which simulates the appearance of being 3D.

Levels consist of several missions, which are based around the destruction of weapons and installations, as well as rescuing hostages or prisoners of war, or capturing enemy personnel. The helicopter is armed with machine guns, Hydra rockets and Hellfire missiles. The more powerful the weapon, the fewer can be carried: the player must choose an appropriate weapon for each situation. Enemy weapons range from armoured cars to artillery and tanks.

The player's craft has a limited amount of armour, which is depleted as the helicopter is hit by enemy fire. Should armour reach zero, the craft will be destroyed, costing the player a life. The player must outmanoeuvre enemies to avoid damage, but can replenish armour by means of power-ups or by airlifting rescued friendlies or captives to a landing zone. Vehicles have a finite amount of fuel which is steadily depleted as the level progresses. Should the fuel run out, the vehicle will crash, again costing the player a life. The craft can refuel by collecting fuel barrels. Vehicles also carry limited ammunition, which must be replenished by means of ammo crates.

== Development and release ==
Jungle Strike is the sequel to Desert Strike, a similar game which parodied the Gulf War and was released in 1992. Desert Strike arose from a failed attempt at a flight simulator and was inspired by Matchbox toys and Choplifter. Central to the concept were nonlinear gameplay and the eschewing of power-ups and bosses. With the success of the original title, game director John Manley and associate producer Tony Barnes were tasked with making the sequel. Together with project manager Susan Manley, they crafted an expanded game with an opening movie and were Electronic Arts first ever 16 Megabit cartridge. Producer Scott Berfield joined the group when the project was Alpha. Jungle Strike kept the core mechanics of its predecessor, with the addition of various vehicles and settings. Desert Strike was at the time Electronic Arts' highest selling video game and maintained a high sales chart position as Jungle Strike was released in 1993.

The Amiga conversion of Desert Strike featured upgraded graphics and sound over the Mega Drive original. With regards to the Jungle Strike Amiga conversion, senior programmer Stuart Johnson stated that he "tried to keep this conversion a lot more faithful to the Mega Drive version than Desert Strike was". He tried to make the Amiga conversion run more smoothly than the Mega Drive original. Graphical improvements were attempted: these were less successful on the A500 than the A1200 because of technical restrictions. The developers also struggled with technical challenges because of differences in hardware between the Mega Drive and Amiga. Amendments were also made to the workings of in-mission plot screens. The Amiga conversion was released as sequel Urban Strike was published for the Mega Drive in 1994.

The DOS CD-ROM version includes full motion video cutscenes during the introduction, between stages, and the ending.

Jungle Strike was followed by three further sequels: Urban Strike, Soviet Strike, and Nuclear Strike. As the series moved to more advanced consoles, creator Mike Posehn became less involved in the programming side of development. Urban Strike, released for the Mega Drive, featured new vehicles and locations, in addition to on-foot sections. Soviet Strike, released for Sony's PlayStation and the Sega Saturn in 1996, featured 3D graphics, as did Nuclear Strike, released on PC and PlayStation in 1997 and the Nintendo 64 in 1999. Another sequel provisionally titled Future Strike was planned, but the game was eventually released as Future Cop: LAPD, a mech-based shooter game.

== Reception ==
Jungle Strike

Aggregate score
Aggregator	Score
GameRankings	85%(Genesis); 71.87%(SNES); 53.85%(GB)

Review scores
Publication	Score
Electronic Gaming Monthly	4.875/10 (GB)
Next Generation	3/5
Sega Force	94% & 96%
Amiga Format	87%
The One	86%
CU Amiga	85%
Amiga Power	77%

Award
Publication	Award
MegaTech	Hyper Game

The game was well received by critics upon release. Adrian Pitt and Mat Yeo of Sega Force both reviewed the game. Adrian Pitt called the title a "strategy game" and commended it as the "greatest game in the genre". Pritt said the controls were "without fault" and the graphics "superb". Mat Yeo praised the "amazing playability and 'lastability'" and said the game was "twice as good" as Desert Strike. Yeo called the graphics "brilliant" and said the game was "the best shoot 'em up I've seen in a long time". The Mega Drive version was a best-seller for 3 months. Across its console releases, Jungle Strike sold 250,000 copies in the country during 1993, ranking as the ninth best-selling home video game of the year.

MegaTech magazine said it has "impressive graphics and tons of missions". Lim Choon Klet of New Straits Times praised the "simply wonderful" graphics, but questioned whether the sound effects were enough to "create the environment of a full-scale war". Choon Klet pointed to a high initial difficulty, but said: "Once the skills are acquired, be ready for many hours of enjoyment and sleepless nights." Chip and Jonathan Carter of St. Petersburg Times deemed the game one of the best of the year and felt the SNES version "loses nothing in the translation". They said the Game Boy and Game Gear versions were "less impressive" due to their technical restrictions, but "about as good as you can get on the small screen". "Sir Garnabus" of GamePro was impressed with the Game Boy version's clear and detailed graphics, lack of slowdown, good controls, and faithfulness to the original version, but judged the Game Gear version to be "merely average", saying issues such as poor collision detection hamper the game despite its outstanding graphics. The four reviewers of Electronic Gaming Monthly commented that the Game Boy version has good control, but the small graphics make it a struggle to play. They said the playability is dramatically better with the Super Game Boy, but it would make no sense to buy the Game Boy version intending to play it that way, since Jungle Strike had already been released for the SNES. Amiga CD32 Gamer called Jungle Strike "a 500lb gorilla among games" and praised the controls and "masses of gameplay and realistic detail".

Amiga Computing said: "With its impressive graphics and superbly designed game system, it could well be the best chopper title yet" although the reviewer felt the difficulty curve was too steep. Amiga Format said of the game: "with a little more foresight and planning, it could have been a lot more fun", as the reviewer was irritated by the fact that fuel, armour and ammunition levels were displayed on the map screen. However, the magazine also wrote: "The bottom line though, is that Jungle Strike is an incredibly good game". Amiga Power called the game "an appreciable shoot 'em up", but said it was "clearly tailored for the shorter attention span" of a console gamer. CU Amiga Magazine wrote: "This blend of shooting and thinking action blends together seamlessly and in the process creates a classic blaster well worth a ride". The One Amiga magazine wrote: "Jungle Strike's a fine game, which will prove both a challenge for Desert Strike-ophiles, and a good solid blast for first bloods". ACAR observed the "Good graphics, okay sound, smooth animation and tough game play." Amiga Power complained that "Throughout the game you're battered with uneasily right-wing US politics", while Amiga Format said "jingoism" in the game was "rife". Amiga CD32 Gamer called the plot "typically 'ugly American' idiocy".

GamePro commented on the game's skillful challenge and variety of locales, and particularly praised the Super NES version for retaining the same gameplay of the Genesis version while improving on the graphics and sound.

Next Generation reviewed the PC version, rating it three stars out of five, and stated that "it's just what the doctor ordered for PC owners who feel nostalgic for their old Segas and Super Nintendos."

=== Accolades ===
Mega placed the game at No. 13 in their Top Mega Drive Games of All Time. In 1995, Total! ranked Jungle Strike 29th on their Top 100 SNES Games. In the same year, Flux magazine listed the Sega Genesis version 38th on their "Top 100 Video Games." In 2017, Gamesradar rated the game 16th in their "Best Sega Genesis/Mega Drive games of all time." IGN ranked the game #71 on their "Top 100 SNES Games of All Time."
