= Future Cop =

Future Cop may refer to:

- Future Cop: LAPD, a 1998 third-person shooter published and developed by Electronic Arts
- Future Cop (TV series), an American science fiction television series
- Future Cops, a 1993 Hong Kong action-comedy film loosely based on the Street Fighter video game franchise.
- Trancers, a 1984 science fiction film that was also released under the name Future Cop.
