= SW4 =

SW4 may refer to:

- SW4 in London, from the SW postcode area
- Toyota Fortuner, a mid-size SUV
- Star Wars Episode IV: A New Hope, a 1977 American epic space opera film written and directed by George Lucas
- Thanggam LRT station, Singapore

== See also ==
- SWIV (1991 videogame), also called Silkworm IV (Silkworm 4)
