= Free D.C! =

1991 video game

- Developer: Cineplay Interactive
- Publisher: Cineplay Interactive
- Release: 1991

Free D.C! is a 1991 video game published by Cineplay Interactive.

== Gameplay ==
Free D.C! is a game in which the machines took control of the world in the early 21st century, and hundreds of years later the surviving humans start to fight back.

== Reception ==
Reception

Review score
Publication	Score
Zero	80

Charles Ardai reviewed the game for Computer Gaming World, and stated that "Cineplay can do better than this — and almost certainly will. Free D.C! is ambitious, well-intentioned and promising, but it is also a failure."

Duncan MacDonald for Zero praised the character portraits and the storyline, calling it "an adventure game for people who are crap at adventures."

Joyce Worley for Electronic Games gave the game a B− and praised the sci-fi premise and its simple interface.

William R. Trotter for Game Players PC Entertainment complained that the game was a fizzle rather than a delight: "Given the kind of talent assembled for this project, game players had every right to expect something much better than this drab exercise."

Amiga Power called its chances of success "Slim, to say the least" but offered the possibility that "The PC version wasn't too hot but it's said improvements have been made for the Amiga so there's hope for it yet."

== Reviews ==
- ASM (Aktueller Software Markt) - May, 1992
- Datormagazin Vol 1992 No 12 (Jul 1992)
- Play Time - Jul, 1992
- Power Play - Jul, 1992
- PC Joker - Jan, 1992
