= Super SWIV =

1992 video game

Super SWIV Firepower 2000 Mega SWIV
- European SNES cover art
- Developer: The Sales Curve
- Publishers: Time Warner Interactive (EU); Sunsoft (US); Coconuts Japan (JP)
- Artists: Ned Langman, Robert Whitaker
- Composer: David Whittaker
- Platforms: Super NES, Mega Drive
- Release: Super NES: NA: November 1992; JP: November 1992; EU: August 1993; Mega Drive: EU: February 17, 1995
- Genre: Scrolling shoot'em up
- Modes: Single-player, multiplayer

Super SWIV (Firepower 2000 in the US) is a top-down shoot 'em up released for the Super Nintendo Entertainment System in 1992. It was released as Mega SWIV on the Mega Drive in 1995. It is the sequel to the 1991 game SWIV. It was followed by SWIV 3D in 1996.

The game's story involves a secret underground race on an island in the Atlantic Ocean which has stolen top military vehicles and equipment from around the world and built powerful war machines from them. Military and intelligence officials of major countries detect them, but are afraid that they will be unable to prepare against an assault by this underground race. They send the player character in to infiltrate their base and destroy them.

Players can control either a helicopter or a jeep. The helicopter is not stopped by obstacles but the jeep can fire in any direction. There are nine weapons (five permanent, four short-lasting specials) the player can pick up along the way.

== Reception ==
Reception

Aggregate score
Aggregator	Score
GameRankings	82.40% (SNES)

Review score
Publication	Score
Wizard	B (SNES)

Super Gamer reviewed the SNES version and gave an overall score of 70% writing: "Another vertical scroller with the addition of simultaneous two-player action. Sadly graphics and gameplay are rather dull and unoriginal." In 1995, Total! rated Super SWIV 72nd on its Top 100 SNES Games writing: "It looks a bit dated but this shooter is brilliantly designed. It's a two-player jobby too." Glenn Rubenstein of Wizard praised Firepower 2000 for there finally being an above average shooter for the SNES that was not produced by Konami, however not much effort was put into the graphics or plot. He commented that the gameplay being heavy on action made it an overall winner concluding: "Should be big with shooter fans, but the general player probably won't get too into it."

== See also ==
- SWIV, a version of the game on various home computer platforms
