= Nuclear Strike =

Shooter video game by Electronic Arts for the PlayStation in 1997

- PlayStation cover art
- Developers: Electronic Arts; Tiburon Entertainment (Windows); Pacific Coast Power & Light (N64)
- Publishers: Electronic Arts; THQ (N64)
- Directors: John Manley; Michael Becker; Jim Rushing; Thomas Boyd
- Producers: Michael Kosaka; Paul Grace
- Designer: R. J. Berg
- Programmers: David Gregory; Marco Busse; Marek Telgarsky; Stuart Riffle; Jeremy Paulding; Keelan Stuart
- Artist: Margaret Foley
- Composers: Don Veca; David O'Neal
- Series: Strike
- Platforms: PlayStation, Windows, Nintendo 64
- Release: PlayStation: NA: September 24, 1997; PAL: September 1997; Windows: NA: September 29, 1997; PAL: February 2, 1998; JP: February 2, 1998; Nintendo 64: NA: November 30, 1999; EU: March 3, 2000
- Genre: Shooter
- Mode: Single-player

Nuclear Strike is a shooter video game developed and published by Electronic Arts for the PlayStation in 1997. The game is the sequel to Soviet Strike and the fifth installment in the Strike series, which began with Desert Strike on the Sega Genesis. The Soviet Strike development team also created Nuclear Strike. EA released a Windows port the same year; THQ developed and in 1999 published a Nintendo 64 version called Nuclear Strike 64.

Nuclear Strike is a helicopter-based game, with strategy elements added to the action gameplay. The plot concerns an elite special force – the player's allies – pursuing a nuclear-armed rogue spy through a fictionalised Asian setting. It retains the earlier game's engine but added several modifications to improve graphical performance and make the game more accessible. The game features 15 playable vehicles, a large increase from previous games. In addition to the main fictionalised Apache, there are secondary helicopters, jets, armor and a hovercraft. The player also commands ground troops in occasional real-time strategy sections.

The game received mixed reviews. Critics noted a weak storyline, but praised the full-motion video, as well as the music and sound effects. Reviewers enjoyed the straightforward gameplay, but several complained of a close similarity to its predecessor Soviet Strike and questioned the game's value as a result.

== Plot ==
The game begins in Indocine, a fictional Southeast Asian country. The player controls a Super Apache helicopter as part of the STRIKE covert operations force, led by General Earle (John Marzilli) and assisted by technician Hack (Antwon Tanner) and propagandist and covert operative Andrea Gray (Susan Turner-Cray). The antagonist is Colonel Beauford LeMonde (Bo Hopkins), a spy-turned-warlord who has stolen a nuclear weapon. Allied to STRIKE in Indocine is guerrilla leader Naja Hana (Moon Bloodgood), whose forces join the player in attacking LeMonde's forces. Meanwhile, LeMonde bluffs STRIKE by arming a fake nuclear bomb in an old temple compound, which results in Naja attempting to locate the warhead and LeMonde. At the same time, the player is sent on a wild goose chase attacking a decoy convoy thought to have the nuclear bomb being transported away from Indocine. In actuality, LeMonde escapes capture long before STRIKE can catch up to him and he manages to smuggle the real nuclear bomb away from Indocine off-screen. This prompts the player to extract Naja from the now booby-trapped compound before the whole compound blows up. Nonetheless, his forces are eventually defeated in Indocine and STRIKE moves their operations to the South China Sea, where LeMonde is discovered dealing with Napoleon Hwong (Philip Tan), head of a fictional Triad-like criminal organization known as the Octad. The player recruits mercenary Harding Cash (Jamie Donovan) to battle the pirate warlord in an attempt to recover the missing nuclear weapon. After defeating Hwong's forces, the player and Harding manage to capture and interrogate Hwong for information concerning the whereabouts of the nuke long enough before Hwong commits suicide. The player eventually heads to Pyongyang, North Korea, where the stolen nuke is located.

LeMonde resurfaces in Pyongyang, where North Korean ruler Kym Zung-Lee invites several world leaders to a peace conference. The two plan to kidnap the world leaders, especially since Kim financed LeMonde's operations in Indocine and getting the nuclear weapon (stashed inside Kim Il Sung's statue on Mansudae Hill). Using a small helicopter and nonlethal weapons, the player is able to spirit the delegates to a French frigate somewhere in the Taedong River and get them out of the country; other delegates left behind are sent to bomb shelters or are evacuated by STRIKE Chinook transports. Also, between escorting the delegates to safety, the player and Andrea manage to take over an AH-1 Cobra attack helicopter from a museum while fending off Kym's security forces in the process. The missing nuclear weapon explodes as the player sits out the blast in the Rungnado May Day Stadium.

North Korea blames the nuclear explosion on the South and sends its forces across the DMZ in an attempt to start a second Korean War while LeMonde heads to Russia. STRIKE heads down to the DMZ and assists US Forces Korea and the South Korean Army in repelling the assault. Having prevented another Korean War, STRIKE, together with Naja and Cash, attacks an old Mongol-era fortress in Siberia, where LeMonde has brought in mercenaries to fortify it as he prepares the launch of a "proto-nuclear" missile designed to rupture the ozone layer. LeMonde's forces are eventually routed, the proto-nuclear missile is eventually destroyed, LeMonde himself is killed, and Naja and Cash fall in love, while STRIKE prepares for its next conflict.

== Gameplay ==
The player's helicopter destroys an enemy ship, with ensuing explosions.

Nuclear Strike is a helicopter-based shooter game with a blend of both strategy and action, which the player views from outside the helicopter from an overhead perspective. It is similar to previous games in the series, but has 15 playable vehicles, a larger number than any of its predecessors. The main helicopter is a fictional Super Apache, with additional helicopters including the Cobra and other Hueys. Playable jets include the Harrier jump jet and a fictional V/STOL version of the A-10 Thunderbolt II. The player can use surface vehicles including the M1 Abrams tank, Bradley armoured vehicle, the Multiple Launch Rocket System and a PACV hovercraft.

The game features five different terrain settings, with each level played on a large map divided into several missions. These missions include seek-and-destroy, search-and-rescue, escorts, the destruction of bridges, supply drops and air support. In some sections the player forms part of a coordinated attack with AI-controlled allies, while in others the player directs ground troops in the style of a real-time strategy game. In addition to engaging in combat, the player must avoid running out of fuel and ammunition. The heads-up display shows this information, along with intelligence on missions objectives and on friendly and enemy units and their locations. The compass indicating mission objectives is a feature new to Nuclear Strike, as is a radar showing the positions of nearby enemies.

== Development ==
The game is the second 32-bit Strike game: the sequel to Soviet Strike and the fifth installment in the Strike series, which began with Desert Strike on the Sega Genesis. It was developed at Electronic Arts' Granite Bay Software, by a 50-member team led by producer Michael Kosaka and including the same core group of designers, programmers, artists and composers that developed Soviet Strike. Series creator Mike Posehn received royalties for Nuclear Strike but did not work on programming the game. The game retained Soviet Strike's engine, with several modifications. The development team increased the frame rate by 25% over its predecessor, resulting in a faster and smoother feel. The game streams the environment from its CD, resulting in no perceptible loading time, while the terrain itself is persistent: damage such as cratering remains for the duration of play. The team improved the artificial intelligence and added more camera angles, though the game like its predecessors still eschews any in-cockpit perspective.

Soviet Strike received criticism regarding the player's limited view of the surroundings and attacks from the enemies found there. To offset this potential problem, the developers added a radar to the HUD, which displayed surrounding enemies to the player. Gamers also criticized the difficulty of Soviet Strike. A high difficulty level being traditional to the Strike series, the team did not wish to alienate long-term fans by making Nuclear Strike directly easier, but instead made it more accessible, using such devices as the new radar, a new compass indicating the direction of the next objective and more visual and audio clues. Producer Kosaka explained: "A lot of the stuff we couldn't fit in [Soviet Strike] is going in this one". The team added several new vehicles, as well as continuing the occasional real time strategy sections found in Soviet Strike. The jets proved problematic in early testing due to their speed, but appeared in the final game. Heat-seeking missiles were among the new additions, as was a proprietary technology termed the Interactive Music System. This generates more intense music depending on the level of action occurring in-game. Palomar Studios created the full motion video, for which some footage was shot in both Thailand and the Bronson Cave, used as the Batcave in the 1960s television incarnation of Batman. This latter shoot also employed a live tiger.

Initially only the PlayStation version and a Windows port were planned, but the game appeared on the Nintendo 64 in 1999 as Nuclear Strike 64. The Windows port was developed by EA Tiburon, with both the original PlayStation and Windows versions published by Electronic Arts in 1997. Nuclear Strike 64 was developed by Pacific Coast Power & Light and published by THQ. Another sequel provisionally titled Future Strike was later planned, but the game was eventually released as Future Cop: LAPD, a mech-based shooter game.

== Reception ==
Daily Radar found the story lacking, while GameSpot's Shane Mooney defended it thus: "people moan about a lack of a compelling story in action titles, which makes about as much sense as complaining about the lack of a nailgun in a football sim [...] People couldn't care less if the story was written by Steinbeck or Stymy the Hack, as long as they get to see THX-rattling fireballs and bad guys bleeding from every orifice."

IGN noted improved graphics, which it favourably compared to those of a John Woo film. GameSpot called the graphics as "about as good as it gets", particularly with a 3D video card. The New Straits Times also appreciated the game's performance with a 3Dfx Voodoo card, praising the graphics of the terrain, as well as water and helicopter movements. GameFan acclaimed the attention to detail and variety in environment graphics' textures. GamePro opined that "Smooth, polished landscapes and polygon-rich explosions snazz up the graphics, but the backgrounds aren't interactive and actually look fake (especially the frozen whitecap swells in the ocean)." Reviewing the Windows version, Allgame called the graphics "decent", but criticised the minimal progress from Soviet Strike which resulted in "a slightly archaic look" and lack of "a feel of individuality". Reviewing Nuclear Strike 64, the website noted that the graphics ably handled numerous explosions and enemies. The reviewer praised the detail, colours and fluid motion. He also acknowledged the use of the N64's Expansion Pak, but said "the game still moves and looks very nice" without it. Game Revolution felt: "This is definitely the best-looking 'Strike' game yet." It complimented the "gorgeously rendered" maps and the detail on structures and units, while Next Generation complained of "water that doesn't ripple and a few other missing touches" resulting in a somewhat haphazard feel. Daily Radar praised the terrain graphics but called the vehicles "horrible". Power Play praised the impressive graphics and destructible scenery. Game Revolution also praised the persistent battlefields: "What really stands out is the ability to interact with everything. When you shoot water, you see and hear the splashes. You can blow up almost anything that they've put on the map" but noted the sometimes unrealistic results, such as ships being launched high into the air upon destruction. Edge said the terrain graphics were "some of the best yet on the PlayStation", but there were otherwise no ground-breaking visuals.

GameFan praised the "super stylish" full motion video. Kraig Kujawa of Electronic Gaming Monthly described it as "snazzy, MTV-style", while his co-reviewer Shawn Smith said it was impressive enough for him to yearn for a Nuclear Strike feature-length film. Allgame felt the game to be worth playing for the FMV alone, calling it the "best aspect of the game" and "an awesome video presentation that, combined with a number of high quality voice-acting jobs, does a great job of conferring the intensity and danger of the nuclear dilemma at hand." Game Revolution noted the strong production values of most of the FMV and while a minority had "back yard" production, they nevertheless used quality actors and "fairly impressed" the reviewer, though he criticised the "MTV-like editing". Edge also noted the "MTV-style presentation" and called it "stylish" and atmospheric. Reviewing Nuclear Strike 64, Allgame praised the atmospheric music as "reminiscent of a large budget political spy thriller". The reviewer said: "what really cranks up the adrenaline and ramps up the immersion factor in the game is the great sound effects."

Nuclear Strike

Aggregate score
Aggregator	Score
GameRankings	79.11% (PS); 83.33% (PC); 72.35% (N64)

Review scores
Publication	Score
AllGame	2.5/5 (PC); 4/5 (N64)
Edge	7/10 (PS)
Electronic Gaming Monthly	8.25/10 (PS)
Game Informer	9/10 (PS); 8.75/10 (N64)
GameRevolution	B+
GameSpot	5.5/10 (PS); 7.8/10 (PC); 6.8/10 (N64)
IGN	7.6/10 (PS); 7.1/10 (N64)
Next Generation	3/5 (PS); 4/5 (N64)
Power Play (DE)	83% (PC)
Super GamePower	3/5 (PS)
Daily Radar	Miss (N64)

Allgame said the enjoyment "isn't bad", but limited: "You can only blow up so much stuff with a helicopter." Glenn Rubenstein of GameSpot in his PlayStation review called the game tired and mediocre, but reviewing the Windows version, Shane Mooney wrote: "I'm happy to say that the much-maligned action-heavy, plot-light genre has received a solid kick in the pants from the wonderfully fun Nuclear Strike." Mooney praised the successful port from the console version and believed players would "find plenty to slobber over in this extremely entertaining title." GamePro assessed that "newcomers [to the Strike series] may find the action too involved, while Command & Conquer cadets may find the blast-and-fly-past strategy too simple." Daily Radar said: "When it comes to creating an action game, it would be nice to play something that requires a little bit more than just holding down the fire button continuously. In Nuclear Strike 64, that's just about all you do." The website said: "if all you're looking for is a game where you can fly around in a helicopter, drive a tank and manipulate 10 other vehicles in a destructive fest, well, here you go." Kujawa argued that the game challenges the player to know which vehicle to use in each situation and manage their fuel, ammunition, and armor, and co-reviewers Crispin Boyer and Kelly Rickards agreed that the game is extremely challenging. Allgame summarised: "When all is said and done, Nuclear Strike 64 is a fine example of an excellent shooting game." The reviewer believed that gamers would appreciate the game's longevity and variety. Game Revolution praised the helpful interface and responsive controls and said the mechanics were generally good, but complained of an occasionally inaccurate targeting system. The website acclaimed the "perfect" difficulty level. GameFan took issue with enemies shooting the player's vehicle while not visible on-screen. GameSpot's minor complaints were infrequent game saves, a "too easy" structure allowing supply lines to be destroyed before the main forces, a short game despite large missions and a lack of multiplayer.

Allgame felt Nuclear Strike "is really nothing more than a repackaged version of the earlier game". The reviewer felt there to be limited motivation for owners of Soviet Strike to buy the new sequel other than the FMV. GamePro similarly said it "is simply more of the same. Even with the enhancements, the game plays exactly like the previous strikes ..." Boyer likewise said it "looks and plays just like Soviet Strike", but his three EGM co-reviewers all contended that it fixed all of its predecessor's problems with sharper graphics, smoother scrolling, clearer mission objectives, a more intuitive map interface, and more craft to choose from. GameFan called Nuclear Strike "a tangible improvement over its predecessor" and "a more satisfying experience all round." The writer felt the increased number of vehicles set the game apart from Soviet Strike, saying they "make for a far richer, more active playing experience." He recommended it to Soviet Strike devotees, while Power Play recommended it for fans of action games. IGN wrote the game was a "fine example" of the series, also citing a broader range of vehicles over Soviet Strike. Nonetheless, it gave Nuclear Strike a lower score than the game's predecessor, saying "at its heart Nuclear Strike is the same game as Soviet Strike [...] It's not a bad game, it's just more of the same." GameFan's reviewers called Nuclear Strike "the definitive strike game" and said it "trounces all other Strikes that have come before." Previewing the PlayStation version, Super GamePower predicted the improved explosion effects, missions and wider range of vehicles would make it the best in the series. In its review, the magazine said the game contained nothing new for fans of the previous games, but felt the control system, explosions, helicopter sound effects to be excellent. Next Generation said: "Those who enjoyed Soviet Strike are certain to like Nuclear Strike even more", but said the games are almost indistinguishable. Game Revolution acknowledged the game is "basically the same rehash of its predecessors, but it stands as a great game on its own. Nuclear Strike is a definite buy for fans who haven't tired of the series, and at least a 'rent me' for those who have been locked in the closet and haven't played any 'Strike' games." Edge said: "Fans of the series lusting after more above-viewed shooting action will naturally welcome this latest regurgitation. The seasoned gamer, however, will no doubt walk away with a feeling of déja vu."

Rick Sanchez reviewed the Nintendo 64 version of the game for Next Generation, rating it four stars out of five, and stated that "Small flaws keep this from being perfect – target colors on the map can be confusing, for example – but overall, Nuclear Strike is a solid action game with a lot of variety and great play mechanics."
