= XS (video game) =

1996 video game

- UK cover art
- Developer: SCi
- Publishers: NA: GT Interactive; EU: SCi
- Platform: MS-DOS
- Release: 1996
- Genre: First-person shooter
- Modes: Single-player, multiplayer

XS is a first-person shooter released by SCi Games and GT Interactive for MS-DOS on December 31, 1996.

== Plot ==
The game is set in the far future during a gladiator-style blood sport. The main character was told about the event by an associate who is believed dead at the start of the game. The player has to fight through a number of rounds of free for all deathmatch-style combat, choosing a pair of weapons to use before the match begins. The battles are to the death with the corpses of the losers used as meat for fast-food burgers. After defeating all the enemies the player's associate reveals himself and murders the player, taking the prize money for himself.

== Reception ==
Reception

Review scores
Publication	Score
Computer Gaming World	2/5
GameSpot	4.9/10
