= Gender Wars =

1996 video game

- Developers: The 8th Day; Sales Curve Interactive
- Publishers: GT Interactive; Sales Curve Interactive
- Director: Rob Henderson
- Producers: Jane Cavanagh; Steven Bishop; Fergus McNeill
- Designers: Ged Keaveney; Mark Watson; Jerr O'Carroll
- Programmers: Mark Watson; Ged Keaveney; Barry Irvine
- Artists: Jerr O'Carroll; Jim Bot‑Masey; Billy Allison
- Platform: DOS
- Release: 1996
- Genres: Real-time tactics, action
- Mode: Single-player

Gender Wars is a real-time tactics action game developed by The 8th Day and Sales Curve and published for DOS by GT Interactive and Sales Curve Interactive in 1996. The game is set at an undetermined point in the future in which humanity is divided into two warring societies based on gender.

== Gameplay ==
The player controls a squad leader and any of their members, as they kill enemies, destroy enemy facilities, or retrieve devices. However, the player will have to control each member at a time, as they have difficulty navigating by themselves.

== Plot ==
In the future, after an era of "political correctness and equality", humanity is divided into two warring factions based on sex and enters a brutal conflict known as the "Gender Wars". Each faction is a caricature of conventional gender stereotypes. The Male faction are crass jocks obsessed with alcohol and other "manly" things while the Females are vapid Valley Girl archetypes preoccupied with fashion and other stereotypically feminine interests. Both factions conduct raids against the other to steal cloning material and capture the other's leader.

The player has to choose between the Male or the Female faction. Regardless of the player's choice, the victorious faction will put the remaining members of the defeated sex into servitude. The game ends with the narrator mentioning the player's faction was overthrown by rebellion caused by men and women working together, taking place a few years after the end of the Gender Wars.

== Reception ==
GameSpot gave Gender Wars a "Fair" review score of 6.6/10, opining it is "a solid arcade strategy game that doesn't require lots of concentration, and has enough depth to keep things interesting. This basic premise, along with the game's original story line, good video and sound, and surprisingly good gameplay, make for a very engaging title." A retrospective by Richard Cobbett of PC Gamer called it "a rubbish Syndicate wannabe," one which still handles its subject "better than Rex Nebular and the Cosmic Gender Bender."
