= Cover Girl Strip Poker =

1991 erotic video game

- European Commodore 64 cover art
- Developer: Emotional Pictures (Original, Denmark): Leisure Soft (CD-ROM DOS, Germany) The Sales Curve (Amiga, Germany) Storm (Amiga, Germany; C64, Germany) Unreal (Amiga, Europe (Note: Outside of Denmark))
- Publisher: Emotional Pictures (Original, Denmark): On-Line Entertainment (CD-ROM DOS, Europe, Germany; CDTV, Europe) [Storm (CD-ROM DOS, Germany; Amiga, Germany, Europe) Proein S.A (CD-ROM DOS, Spain) The Sales Curve (DOS, Italy; C64, Italy, Germany, Europe; Amiga, France, Europe) United Software (Amiga, Germany; C64, Germany) InterActive Vision A/S (CDTV, Denmark)
- Directors: Ulf Stjernbo (Amiga, DOS, C64); Kenneth Bernholm (Amiga, DOS); Ole Mogensen (C64)
- Producers: Ole Mogensen (Amiga, DOS, C64); Kenneth Bernholm (Amiga, DOS)
- Programmers: Johnny Christensen, Samuel S. Nova (DOS); Claus O. Michelsen (CDTV, Amiga); Henrik Nørgaard Jørgensen (C64)
- Artists: Jacob Andersen, Henrik Thomas, Kenneth Bernholm, Henrik Bækdahl (Amiga, DOS); Jørgen Ryhne Andersen, Hans Jürgen Hansen (Amiga); Henrik Nørgaard Jørgensen, Ivan Eriksen, Ole Mogensen, Henrik N. Jorgensen (C64)
- Writer: Kenneth Bernholm (Amiga)
- Composers: Jacob Gadegaard Frandsen, Henrik Koitzsch, Martin de Agger (Amiga); Jesper Olsen (DOS); Thomas Bendt, Thomas Mogensen (C64)
- Platforms: Amiga, DOS, Commodore 64, CDTV, CD32 (Note: Many CDTV games are compatible with the CD32 without the need for a new release, and Cover Girl Strip Poker is specifically outlined by several magazines to be CD32 compatible.)
- Release: 1991 (Note: The copyright date given in the original DOS, Commodore 64, and CDTV releases is 1991, and these releases and the Amiga release were all advertised as being released and available in February 1992.); February 1992 (Amiga, Europe, Storm); May 1992 (C64, Europe, Sales Curve); 1993 (CD-ROM DOS, Europe, On-Line); 1994 (CD-ROM DOS, Spain, Proein S.A)
- Genres: Card game
- Modes: Single-player, Multiplayer

Cover Girl Strip Poker, alternately titled Cover Girl Poker, is a 1991 erotic video game based upon five-card strip poker and originally developed and self-published by Emotional Pictures; it was released for the Amiga, DOS, Commodore 64, CDTV, and CD32. Cover Girl Strip Poker is the original Danish title; it was retitled Cover Girl Poker outside of Denmark in the rest of Europe, and the title was subsequently reverted to Cover Girl Strip Poker for the European CDTV and CD-ROM DOS releases. Emotional Pictures was a subsidiary of Danish company InterActive Vision A/S.

Cover Girl Strip Poker received negative to mixed reviews from critics; many reviews criticized Strip Poker's 'poor' digitized graphics, 'bad' AI, and several reviews criticized the game's sexual content, calling it 'unappealing' or 'sad'. While other versions of the game received more mixed reviews, reviews of the Commodore 64 version were universally negative. Some reviews criticized Strip Poker as sexist, with one magazine calling it "an affront to the female species". In addendum to this, Strip Poker has a legal disclaimer stating that the game is "Not manufactured, distributed or endorsed by any of the models appearing in the product"; a model featured in the game later stated that she was not informed what the video footage/photoshoot was for, and several models did not receive pay for their work.

== Gameplay ==
Cover Girl Strip Poker's graphics across several ports (as shown here in the Amiga version) were criticized by many reviewers.

Reviews of the Commodore 64 version (pictured) of Strip Poker were universally negative.

Cover Girl Strip Poker is played as five-card strip poker; the player plays against an AI opponent, and may choose between eight models. Strip Poker has a multiplayer mode wherein up to three people may play against a single AI opponent at once, with each player having their own pool of money to bet with. Each time the AI loses $2,000, a digitized female model removes one item of clothing in video footage presented on the screen of a digitized cinema; different models display varying levels of nudity. Each player is dealt a hand of five cards, and may replace any number of those cards with different cards from the deck in order to obtain a winning hand. Both the player and the AI are given $2,500 to bet with, the maximum bet being $999, and there are two rounds of betting: one before the changing of cards and one after. If the player's hand is better than their opponent's, the player wins the betted money, and the cards are shuffled and both players are given new hands of cards. The game is coded so that after winning several hands, subsequent hands are harder to win.

Upon starting the game, the player is prompted to select a language; Cover Girl Strip Poker has releases in Danish, Swedish, English, French, German and Italian. The player may zoom in during the game's nude scenes.

In Cover Girl Strip Poker, four of the eight models in-game have video footage alongside the standard still images; the frame rate and graphic quality of these videos differs between versions of the game.

=== Version differences ===
In the Commodore 64 version, there are six possible opponents as opposed to eight; Signe Andersen and Sofia Bratlund are missing from this version. As opposed to other versions, which require the AI to lose $2,000 multiple times for the game to show sexual content, in the Commodore 64 version of the game, only once is required. In the CDTV and CD-ROM DOS versions, the models' in-game banter with the player is voice acted, and the CDTV version also adds eleven music tracks. The CDTV version of Cover Girl Strip Poker has fifteen minutes of full motion video footage.

In the Commodore 64 version of Strip Poker, the game's graphics are predominantly monochrome.

== Development ==
Tabloid magazine Daily Sport worked with Emotional Pictures in the development of Cover Girl Strip Poker in that models who have appeared in Daily Sport appear in the game: famous UK page 3 model Maria Whittaker, Amanda Godden, Minnie Champ (credited in-game as 'Ginny Champ'), Donna Ewin, Trine Michelsen, Sofia Bratlund, Signe Andersen, and a woman credited only as 'Jane'. Cover Girl Strip Poker was exhibited at the Arets Amiga Expo in Copenhagen, Denmark in March 1992, and Trine Michelsen promoted the game at Emotional Pictures' booth while dressed in lingerie, singing karaoke with attendees.

Danish gaming magazine Det Nye COMputer interviewed Trine Michelsen, who stated that she was not informed what the video footage and photos were for, and that other models were never paid for their work; she stated that she was paid 1000 Danish krone (equivalent to around US$265 in 1992), and that "It was not at all clear what it would be for, and I did it as a favor [for someone I knew]. Apparently some of the other models weren't paid at all." COMputer briefly interviewed Kenneth Bernholm, the CEO of InterActive Vision A/S, the parent company of Emotional Pictures, to ask how much the models were paid, and Bernholm stated that "You can ask, but you won't get an answer". Cover Girl Strip Poker has a disclaimer explicitly stating that the game is "Not manufactured, distributed or endorsed by any of the models appearing in the product"; Amiga Power questioned the legality of this disclaimer.

Due to standards for sexual content as set by The Association for UK Interactive Entertainment and the Video Standards Council, the CDTV version of Cover Girl Strip Poker was labelled with a BBFC 18 certificate; French gaming magazine Joystick speculated that On-Line Entertainment, the publisher of the European CDTV version, was intentionally seeking a mature rating for the game for the sake of publicitity. The CDTV release of Cover Girl Strip Poker is compatible with the Amiga CD32.

According to Computer and Video Games magazine, ports of Cover Girl Poker were planned for the Atari ST and ZX Spectrum, but these were never released. A demo of the Amiga version of Cover Girl Strip Poker was featured on the cover disk of issue one, volume eight of Danish gaming magazine Det Nye COMputer, and a demo of the DOS version was released on the cover disk of issue 31 of Zero. Cover Girl Strip Poker's full motion video was recorded in Malmö, Sweden.

The Danish, French, German, and English narration was recorded by Workstation 1, which also translated the game into French. The Swedish narration was recorded by Niklas Persson, who also performed the Swedish translation. Strip Poker was translated into German by Thomas Schmidt.

To promote the release of Cover Girl Poker, The Sales Curve ran a contest asking the question "What is the weekend equivalent of the Daily Sport?"; ten randomly selected entrants who mailed in the correct answer of "Sunday Sport" received an apron with inflatable breasts attached.

=== Title inconsistencies ===
Cover Girl Strip Poker was originally titled as such in Denmark, and was retitled Cover Girl Poker everywhere else in Europe for the Amiga, Commodore 64 and DOS releases, and is referred to by several different names by different publications; the front cover and the title screen of the Cover Girl Poker version of the game contradict each other as well; the cover art of the Commodore 64 version titles the game Cover Girl Poker, while the in-game title screen in all versions of the game gives the original title of Cover Girl Strip Poker. Other titles given to the game by reviewers include CoverGirl Poker, and Daily Sports Cover Girl Strip Poker or Daily Sport Cover Girl Poker due to the game's affiliation with tabloid magazine Daily Sport, although the title Cover Girl Strip Poker is overall the most commonly used. The European CDTV and CD-ROM DOS releases of Cover Girl Poker were retitled to the original title of Cover Girl Strip Poker.

=== Alternative publishers ===
Cover Girl Strip Poker was originally developed and published by Emotional Pictures, which was a subsidiary of Danish company InterActive Vision A/S; Strip Poker was the only game developed or published by Emotional Pictures. The game was then re-released by multiple different publishers in different countries.

==== Amiga ====
In Germany, an Amiga version was developed by The Sales Curve and published by United Software, and an alternate release was developed and self-published by Storm; both German releases cost 'around 80' Deutschmark in 1992. The European Amiga release of Cover Girl Poker was developed by Unreal and published by Storm, and was released in February 1992, costing £25.99 at launch.

==== DOS ====
The DOS version of Cover Girl Strip Poker was published by The Sales Curve in Italy, and was released on 5 1/4" and 3 1/2" floppy disks.

===== CD-ROM DOS =====
An upgraded CD-ROM DOS version of Cover Girl Strip Poker was released in Europe in 1993, and was published by On-Line Entertainment; it cost £34.99 at launch. In Spain, the CD-ROM DOS version of Cover Girl Strip Poker was published by Proein S.A in 1994. In Germany, the CD-ROM DOS version of Cover Girl Strip Poker was developed by Leisure Soft and published by Storm. In addendum to the version released by Storm, an alternate version was released by On-Line Entertainment, the original publisher of the CD-ROM DOS version, which, according to PC Joker, was due to the Storm version being 'of poor quality'. The German version released by Storm cost 'around 130' Deutschmark in 1994, while the release by On-Line Entertainment cost 'around 80–89' Deutschmark in 1993. In the German On-Line Entertainment CD-ROM DOS release, the voice acting is re-dubbed in German.

==== Commodore 64 ====
The Commodore 64 version of Cover Girl Poker was published by The Sales Curve in Europe, Italy, and Germany. In addendum to the version released by The Sales Curve in Germany, an alternate version of the Commodore 64 release was developed by Storm and published by United Software. Both German C64 releases cost 'around 50' Deutschmark in 1992.

The Commodore 64 version of Cover Girl Poker was released in May 1992 in Europe, and was published by The Sales Curve; it was released both on cassette tapes and floppy disks; the cassette version cost £10.99 at launch, and the floppy disk version cost £15.99.

==== CDTV ====
The CDTV version of Cover Girl Strip Poker was published in Denmark by InterActive Vision A/S, the parent company of Emotional Pictures; it cost 395 Danish krone in 1991. The European CDTV release was published by On-Line Entertainment, and it cost 'around £29.99-£34.99' in 1993.

== Reception ==
Reception

Review scores
Publication	Score
Videogame & Computer World	97.3% (DOS)
Joystick	80% (Amiga)
Det Nye COMputer	78% (Amiga); 69% (CDTV)
Amiga Mania	73% (Amiga)
Zzap! (Italy); Zzap!64 (UK)	67% (C64); 15% (C64)
Amiga Joker	50% (Amiga)
64'er	5/10 (C64)
PC Zone	40% (CD-ROM DOS)
Amiga Computing	34% (CDTV/CD32)
Amiga Magazin	4/12 (Amiga)
Commodore Format	32% (C64)
PC Joker	31% (CD-ROM DOS)
Power Play	30% (Amiga); 24% (CD-ROM DOS)
Amiga Power	1/5 (Amiga); 6% (Amiga)
Amiga Format	19% (Amiga)
CU Amiga	13% (CDTV/CD32)
Aktueller Software Markt	1/12 (C64)
PC Player	6% (CD-ROM DOS)

Cover Girl Strip Poker received largely negative reviews from critics, although some reviewer's scores may not reflect this; the Italian version of Zzap! gave Strip Poker an overall score of 67%, but was thoroughly critical of the game – similarly, PC Zone gave the game 40%, but called the graphics "so badly digitized that what you end up looking at is a lurid collection of flesh colored smudges", and summarized the game as "appallingly bad". While some reviewers praised Strip Poker's digitized graphics, the vast majority of reviewers heavily criticized them; the UK version of Zzap! stated that "[you're hardly] able to recognise the blobby mess as human, let alone a nude woman!", and German magazine PC Player called them "so heavily overexposed that you begin to become worried for the health of your monitor." Some critics expressed that Strip Poker's sexual content is 'fundamentally unattractive', PC Zone expressed that the graphics are only appealing "if you're a Pollock fan", and PC Joker criticized the game's voice acting as "very clinical and sterile", and stated that it "suffocates any eroticism to be had."

While other versions of the game received more mixed reviews, the reception of the Commodore 64 version was universally negative; unique to the C64 version, there is a screen flickering glitch that was criticized by some reviewers; the Italian version of Zzap! called it 'absurd and annoying', while Zzap! UK summarised Strip Poker overall as a "purile excuse for a game".

Cover Girl Strip Poker's gameplay was heavily criticized by many critics; many reviewers expressed that Strip Poker was too easy, as the game's AI is 'bad at poker', which also contributed to the game's 'lack of longevity'. Despite the game's sexual content, many reviewers noted Strip Poker as feeling as though it would appeal only to adolescents who 'shouldn't be able to access it to begin with'; Amiga Computing questioned whether "anyone outside of puberty [would] really pay this kind of money for this kind of sad product?", and PC Zone further criticized Strip Poker as only being exciting "if you've never seen a naked woman before". Several reviews furthermore called Strip Poker 'sad', with Amiga Power summarising it as "A sad game, made even sadder by the fact that you could probably buy a couple of porno mags for the same price!"

Many reviews criticized Cover Girl Strip Poker as 'overpriced', with those that did stating that one could buy 'several pornographic magazines with stronger sexual content' for the same price as the game. Amiga Computing and Zzap! UK criticized Strip Poker as sexist; Computing called it "an affront to the female species", and a critic from Zzap! called it a "sexist concept" and bluntly stated that "If some sexually frustrated dickhead wants to waste twelve quid on this tripe that's his problem". In an article by Amiga Computing strongly condemning the rise of digital pornography, Cover Girl Strip Poker was given as an example of a game that while "perfectly legal", is "thankfully largely absent from the commercial software [market]".

Despite many critical reviews, some publications praised Cover Girl Strip Poker; Spanish gaming magazine pcmanía expressed that it "makes the most of" the capabilities of the CD-ROM medium, and praised Strip Poker's animations as being "fluid and quite attractive". Italian gaming magazine Videogame & Computer World gave Strip Poker a significant overall score of 97.3%, similarly stating that the game "[makes] optimal use of the graphical capabilities of your [graphics] card", and commended Strip Poker as "a definitive product in its genre". Amiga Mania praised Strip Poker's "good" digitised graphics, as well as its gameplay, calling it "one of the best [poker games of this type]", and further stating that "If this is the sort of game you wish to play then you'll have to go a long way before you find one as good as Cover Girl." Many reviews praised the inclusion of UK page 3 girl Maria Whittaker; Serbian computer magazine Svet Kompjutera called her "particularly spellbinding".

Italian gaming magazine Videogame & Computer World gave the DOS version of Cover Girl Strip Poker a highly positive review – an outlier compared to Strip Poker's many negative to mixed reviews – giving it an overall score of 97.3%, and calling the game's music "decidedly superb" and "atmospheric", noting this to be in contrast to other poker video games which have 'poor' sound. Computer World praised Strip Poker's models, expressing that they have "sparkling physical qualities" and are "extremely hot", and further praised the game's graphics as "[making] optimal use of the graphical capabilities of your [graphics] card". Computer World praised Strip Poker's dialogue, expressing that it "[gives] an engaging personality to an already intriguing game in of itself", furthermore calling Strip Poker "a definitive product in its genre".

German gaming magazine PC Player gave the CD-ROM DOS version of Cover Girl Strip Poker an overall score of 6%, expressing that they wanted to stop playing the game as soon as possible, and strongly criticized the game as being "on the border of mental cruelty." PC Player criticized Strip Poker's dubbed German voice acting, stating that "the German voice acting has a sluggishness that will leave you at half-mast ... Another thing that torments me: the women mumble everything", and further called the game's 'unattractive' dialogue "a festival of unintentional hilarity." PC Player heavily criticized Strip Poker's "blurry" graphics, stating that "The graphics are so heavily overexposed that you begin to become worried for the health of your monitor", and further criticized the game's full motion video as "looking like a silent movie". PC Player criticized Strip Poker's gameplay, calling the game's AI and controls "extremely sluggish", and called it "just as lousy as every other strip poker game". PC Player summarised the overall design of the CD-ROM version of Cover Girl Strip Poker as "so disastrously bad that it's impressive."
