= Cool Bricks =

1999 video game

- Cover art
- Developer: Pukka Games
- Publisher: SCi Games
- Platform: Game Boy Color
- Release: 1 December 1999
- Genre: Block breaker
- Mode: Single-player

Cool Bricks is a 1999 block breaker game developed by Pukka Games and published by SCi Games. The game is an adaptation of the arcade game Breakout for the Game Boy Color.

== Gameplay ==
A screenshot of Cool Bricks, depicting the high color mode on the Game Boy Color.

Cool Bricks is a puzzle game requires the player to use a bat to guide a ball to break bricks to progress. Compared to Breakout, Cool Bricks features the inclusion of varied weapons, such as laser guns, missiles, grenade launchers, larger bats or multiple balls, and the addition of power-ups with positive and negative effects, such as a 'poison mode' that causes involuntary player movement. The game features over 150 levels with a password system to allow for returning to certain stages. The graphics of Cool Bricks are programmed to make use of a 'high-color mode' in the Game Boy Color that allows the device to display 2,000 instead of 50 colors on screen, by compromising with reduced animations.

== Reception ==
Reception

Review scores
Publication	Score
Game Boy Xtreme	82%
Total Game Boy Color	86%
64 Magazine	90%

Cool Bricks received positive reviews from gaming publications. Many reviewers made favorable comparisons made to the arcade games Breakout and Arkanoid, whilst praising the minor additions to the game such as the use of power-ups. David O'Donohoe for Console Domain praised the game as a "perfect port" of the Breakout formula, stating that "with a few new graphics and fresh levels in order to sell it to a new, younger audience [...] the gameplay is as addictive now as it has always been". 64 Magazine praised Cool Bricks as "extremely well suited to the Game Boy Color" and "almost impossible to put down once you've started playing". Total Game Boy Color also praised the game, noting whilst it was not "ground-breakingly original", Cool Bricks was an "addictive, challenging puzzler".
