= Hades Nebula =

1987 video game

- C64 box cover
- Developer: Paranoid Software
- Publisher: Nexus Productions
- Platforms: Atari ST, Commodore 64, ZX Spectrum
- Release: 30 April 1987 (C64), 21 May 1987 (Atari ST/Spectrum)
- Genre: Scrolling shooter
- Mode: Single-player

Hades Nebula is a 1987 vertically scrolling shooter for the Commodore 64, ZX Spectrum and Atari ST by Paranoid Software and published by Nexus Productions. The player controls an upgradable fighter that must battle its way through thousands of enemy ships before it confronts the final boss, Emperor Hades. There are fifteen levels.

== Gameplay ==
Gameplay screenshot

Enemies are face-like ships or bug-like ships that materialise at certain points in the game. Upon appearance they immediately seek out the player's ship and collide with it unless evasive action is taken. Also, every one or two levels or so, 'mother ship' bosses are encountered that take a considerable amount of bullet dodging and incisive shots to destroy.

There are two sound options while playing the game: either sound effects or the musical soundtrack by Ben Daglish. The latter is the default mode, and changes depending on whether you are fighting a boss or charging through a level.

== Development ==
Hades Nebula was developed by Paranoid Software: Darren Melbourne, Mark Greenshields and Ned Langman. Ben Daglish provided the music for the Commodore 64 version, while John Brozovski made the sound effects for the Atari ST.

== Reception ==
Reception

Review scores
Publication	Score
Crash	51%
Computer and Video Games	35/40 (C64/Spectrum); 28/40 (ST)
Sinclair User	7/10
Your Sinclair	7/10
Zzap!64	55%
ST Action	78%

A review of the Commodore 64 version in Zzap!64 criticized the game's immense difficulty, citing the unwieldy ship as the primary factor. Although the graphics and presentation were considered well done, the game was considered unplayable, receiving a rating of 55% from the magazine. A review of the ZX Spectrum version in Your Sinclair described it as "another standard shoot-em-up", giving it a 7 out of 10 rating.
