= Urban Strike =

1994 video game

- Developers: Granite Bay Software; Foley Hi-Tech; THQ (ports)
- Publishers: Electronic Arts; Black Pearl Software (ports)
- Director: John Manley
- Producer: Scott Berfield
- Designers: John Manley; Antonio Barnes
- Programmer: Mike Posehn
- Artist: Julie Gast Cressa
- Composer: Don Veca
- Series: Strike
- Platforms: Sega Mega Drive/Genesis, SNES, Game Gear, Game Boy
- Release: 1994 (Genesis); 1995 (SNES, Game Gear); 1996 (Game Boy)
- Genre: Shoot 'em up
- Mode: Single-player

Urban Strike (subtitled The Sequel to Jungle Strike) is a video game developed and published by Electronic Arts. It was initially released for the Sega Genesis in 1994, with ports handled by Black Pearl Software to the Super Nintendo Entertainment System and Game Gear in 1995 and to the Game Boy in 1996. It is the third game in the Strike series, after Desert Strike: Return to the Gulf and Jungle Strike.

== Plot ==
Urban Strike takes place in 2001 (2006 in the Black Pearl releases) and centers around the antagonist H. R. Malone, a millionaire media mogul who once ran for President of the United States. Despite losing the election, Malone's charisma has continued to sway many Americans to his side. Malone's agenda is moralistic and appeals to legitimate problems that have concerned Americans, such as violence, political corruption and organized crime.

As the plot begins, one of Malone's men is revealed to be "Agent Ego" (played by co-Designer, Tony Barnes), a spy for the fictional "Strike C.O.R.E." organization and a former co-pilot from the events of Jungle Strike. Ego reports to his superiors that Malone is planning construction of a superweapon with which to destabilize the U.S. government, and that valuable components are being collected in Hawaii. However, he is unaware that Malone has penetrated his cover, and Ego is killed with a car-bomb. The player character takes the news of Ego's death very personally.

The first mission takes place in Hawaii, where the player character intercepts Malone's attempted theft of giant mirrors and sees to the rescue of a plastic surgeon being targeted by assassins. After the mission's completion, the plastic surgeon reveals that he had operated on a horribly deformed burn victim in Washington DC many years ago, who later turned out to be Malone. The plastic surgeon says he was marked for death because he had recently deduced that the man he actually operated on was Carlos Ortega, who was one of the two main antagonists in (and was presumed killed at the end of) Jungle Strike.

After further missions in Mexico and San Francisco, Malone finishes the superweapon and fires it at New York City, causing mass destruction and chaos. As the player flies out to control the damage and rescue civilians, Malone fires the weapon twice more, allowing Strike C.O.R.E. to track its location: a facility located near Las Vegas. After infiltrating the facility and capturing Malone, the madman attempts to kill the player by detonating a time-bomb strapped to his chest, but the player drops Malone onto his own superweapon as it detonates, destroying them both at once.

== Gameplay ==
Urban Strike is a helicopter based shoot 'em up, mixing action and strategy, retaining its predecessor's core mechanics, and expanding on the model with additional vehicles and settings. This time, the campaign takes the player all over the North American continent, beginning in Hawaii and moving through locations in Mexico, San Francisco, New York, and Las Vegas.

The main model helicopter used in this game is known as the Mohican, which is designed for speed and combat. A larger, heavier model called the Blackhawke (designed for large-scale rescues) can be flown during the first two levels, and an experimental Ground Assault Vehicle (GAV) can be stolen and piloted in the third level. A new feature introduced in this game is on-foot missions, where the player is required to leave the helicopter at certain points and enter internal environments armed with a rifle and missile launcher.

Levels consist of several missions, which are based around the destruction of enemy weapons and installations, as well as rescuing hostages or prisoners of war, or capturing enemy personnel. The Mohican helicopter is armed with machine guns, more powerful Hydra rockets and yet more deadly Hellfire missiles. The more powerful the weapon, the fewer can be carried: the player must choose an appropriate weapon for each situation.

The player's craft has a limited amount of armor, which is depleted as the vehicle is hit by enemy fire. Should the armor reach zero, the craft will be destroyed, costing the player a life. The player must outmaneuver enemies to avoid damage, but can replenish armor by means of power-ups or by airlifting rescued friendlies or captives to a landing zone. The Mohican has a finite amount of fuel which is steadily depleted as the level progresses. Should the fuel run out the Mohican will crash, again costing the player a life. The craft can refuel by collecting fuel barrels. The helicopter also carries limited ammunition, which must be replenished by means of ammo crates.

== Development ==
The game had a marketing budget of £500,000.

== Reception ==
Reception

Review scores
Publication	Score	
Publication	Sega Genesis	SNES
Consoles +	92%	N/A
Computer and Video Games	82/100	N/A
Game Players	83%	N/A
GamePro	17.5/20	N/A
GamesMaster	92/100	N/A
HobbyConsolas	N/A	91/100
Hyper	84/100	N/A
Joypad	N/A	85%
M! Games	81%	67%
Mean Machines Sega	89/100	N/A
Mega Fun	85%	60%
Next Generation	3/5	3/5
Nintendo Power	N/A	12.7/20
Player One	N/A	92%
Super Play	N/A	75%
Total!	N/A	88/100
Video Games (DE)	84%	58%
VideoGames & Computer Entertainment	9/10	N/A
Games World	90/100	N/A

Russian magazine Great Drakon felt Urban Strike to be too easy and thus the weakest game in the series. The 88% review in Mega said: "Very good all round, but EA has taken the genre as far as it can go". Reviewing the Genesis version, GamePro deemed it "a top-notch helicopter-combat cart", citing the "ten massive missions", combination of airborne and ground-based combat, new helicopter moves and techno soundtrack.

A critic for Next Generation declared that the Super NES version is more colorful but overall inferior to the Genesis version, due to the less smooth controls and animation, but that it retains all the essential appeal of the Genesis version. He concluded that while the series formula was becoming stale, it still delivers for those who want more of the same, and gave it three out of five stars.

Next Generation reviewed the Genesis version of the game, rating it three stars out of five, and stated that "With all the great scenery, Urban Strike should be the best Strike game yet, but there's nothing new in the gameplay department, which is a shame." In 1996, GamesMaster ranked the Mega Drive version fifth on their "The GamesMaster Mega Drive Top 10."
