= SWIV 3D =

1996 video game

- Developer: Sales Curve Interactive
- Publisher: Sales Curve Interactive
- Programmers: James Sharman; Richard Matthias
- Artists: Glenn Broadway; Pieter Warmington
- Series: SWIV
- Platforms: Windows, MS-DOS
- Release: 1996
- Genre: Shoot 'em up
- Mode: Single-player

SWIV 3D (also known as SWIV 3D Assault) is a 3D video game remake of SWIV developed and published by Sales Curve Interactive. It was released in 1996 for MS-DOS and Windows. It is the last game in the Silkworm/SWIV series and the only game of the series to use a voxel-based 3D engine.

== Gameplay ==
In SWIV 3D the player pilots a helicopter through a series of landscapes while destroying buildings to fulfil mission goals. There are also opportunities to use an armoured SUV.

== Development ==
SCi attempted to license some tracks by Hallucinogen for the soundtrack, but due to a difficulty with getting royalties cleared, they were not able to secure the license in time for the game's release.

In early 1997, Interplay Productions bought the U.S. publishing rights for the game from Sales Curve, intending to publish the game for the PlayStation in June 1997. However, this version of the game was never released. Interplay did, however, re-release the game as SWIV 3D Assault in the US. Its only notable in-game difference was the implementation of Glide support.

== Reception ==
Reception

Review scores
Publication	Score
GameSpot	8.6/10
PC Review	8/10
Gambler	71%
PC Games	82%
Computer and Video Games	3/5

GameSpot rated the game an 8.6 of 10, stating, "SWIV 3D kicks ass in the shooter genre and avid action gamers will almost certainly kick themselves for not picking up a copy."
