= Zero (video game magazine) =

British video game magazine

- Issue 20, June 1991
- Editor: Gareth Herincx (Nov 89-Dec 89); Jackie Ryan (Jan 90); Tim Ponting (Feb 90-Apr 91); David Wilson (May 91-Aug 92); Amaya Lopez (Sep 92-Oct 92)
- Categories: Video game journalism
- Frequency: Monthly
- Circulation: 60,636 (c. 1991)
- First issue: October 1989
- Final issue Number: October 1992; 36
- Company: Dennis Publishing
- Country: United Kingdom
- Based in: London
- Language: English
- ISSN: 0957-9303
- OCLC: 50819394

Zero was a video game magazine in the UK, published monthly by Dennis Publishing Ltd. between November 1989 and October 1992. (Actual publication dates were in the preceding month, as usual for UK magazines.) It won the InDin Magazine of the Year award in both 1990 and 1991, and was also briefly the best-selling multi-format 16-bit computer magazine in the UK.

== History ==
The pre-launch editor and publisher was Teresa Maughan (also publisher of Your Sinclair) and initial editor was Gareth Herincx, who left during the compilation of issue 3, at which point Tim Ponting took over. Reviewers for the launch issue were: Jonathan Davies, Sean Kelly, Duncan MacDonald, David McCandless, Marcus 'Binky' Berkmann, and Matt Bielby (all former writers for Your Sinclair). Other journalists of note who worked at Zero included David 'Whistlin' Rick' Wilson, 'Lord' Paul Lakin, Amaya Lopez, Jackie Sutton, Rich Pelley and Jane Goldman.

Issue 1 contained a coverdisk containing two free games for the Amiga and Atari ST. A regular coverdisk was later introduced which included full games and playable demos. Zero caused controversy when issue 31 included a playable demo of Cover Girl Poker on the cover disk. This resulted in the magazine being banned from the leading newsagents. By issue 33 the magazine was re-designed without the spine and had taken on a more youth orientated look. The magazine was cancelled three issues later, with issue 36 being the last one.

== Content ==
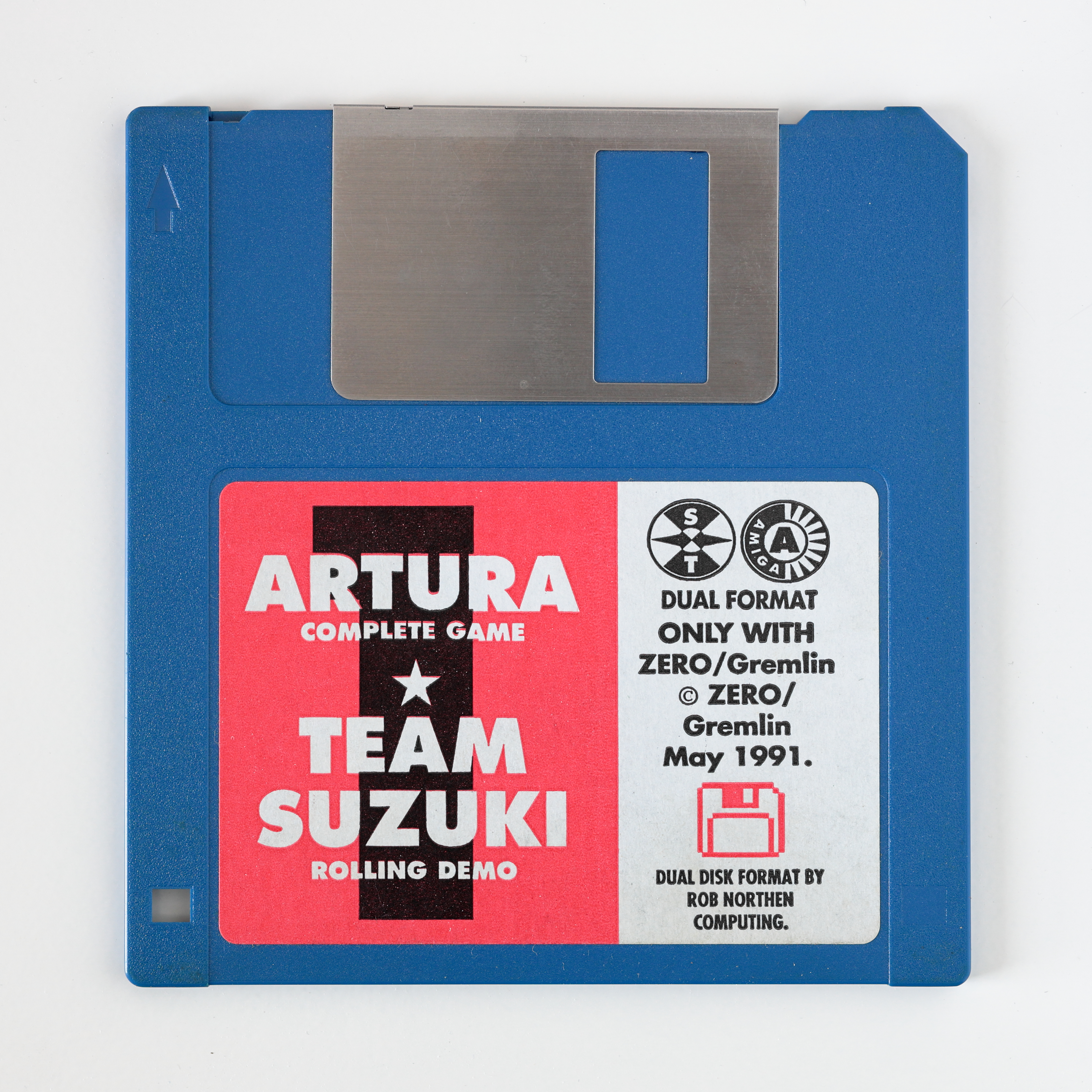
Game demos on a cover disk included with Zero in the May 1991 issue.

Like many similar magazines, it contained sections of news, game reviews, previews, tips, help guides, columnists, reader's letters, and cover-mounted disks of game demos. Some memorable features include "highest joystick" where readers would send in a picture of their gaming apparatus of choice at a high location, such as Ben Nevis or the cockpit of a jet (next to the altimeter), a feature where readers could send in a picture of themselves with a celebrity (One such picture had a topless Richard Branson with two young brothers), and "Smack In The Marf", in which readers could send in (obviously faked) pictures of themselves with their injuries.

The magazine was notable for the considerable off-beat adolescent humour and wordplay used throughout it — a continuation of the style first seen in Your Sinclair. Zero is the precursor to the humorous style of writing used in magazines such as PC Zone, and in fact many of the original writers who contributed to Zero went on to submit work for PC Zone.

- OI! (news and views on everything 16-bit)
- Previews (previews plus the ST, Amiga and PC top tens)
- Letters (readers' views and comments)
- Reviews (accolade – 'Zero Hero' 90+. ratings; Graphics, Sound, Addictiveness, Execution, Overall rating out of 100.)
- Combat Zone (strategy games)
- Under Wraps (an in-depth look at forthcoming games)
- Artifacts (computer graphics expert Alan Tomkins checks out all the latest on graphics software)
- Console Action (The Konix Multi-system revealed, Britain's only mini console magazine at the time)
- Stuff (films, videos, anything topical)
- Arcades (Arcade games)
- Deja Vu (New versions of existing titles, on new formats)
- Crystal Tips (Tips, maps, pokes)
- The Price Is Right (budget games section, later renamed just 'Budgets')
- Chip Shop Boys (in-depth look at people in the industry)
- Adventures (Adventure games)
- Yikes! (The readers page)
