= Soviet Strike =

1996 shooter video game

- North American PlayStation cover art
- Developers: Electronic Arts; Tiburon Entertainment (Saturn)
- Publisher: Electronic Arts
- Series: Strike
- Platforms: PlayStation, Saturn
- Release: PlayStation; NA: October 29, 1996; EU: November 8, 1996; Saturn; NA: February 17, 1997; EU: February 21, 1997
- Genre: Shooter
- Mode: Single player

Soviet Strike is a helicopter-based shooter game developed and published by Electronic Arts for the PlayStation in 1996 and the Sega Saturn in 1997. The game is a sequel to the Strike games which began on the Sega Genesis with Desert Strike: Return to the Gulf. Soviet Strike is the series' first installment for a 32-bit console and was first conceived as 32-bit Strike. Early on, it was intended for the 3DO platform, before development changed to the PlayStation.

Soviet Strike is set after the disintegration of the Soviet Union, and takes place in a fictionalised Russia, Eastern Europe and around the Caspian Sea. The player pilots an Apache helicopter and battles with the forces of Shadowman, a renegade ex-communist figure. Like its predecessors, the game features shooting action mixed with strategic management of fuel and ammunition, but has more authentic 3D graphics, as well as a modified overhead – as opposed to isometric – perspective. The game also features a more realistic enemy artificial intelligence and environment. Critics received the game positively, praising the graphics and full motion video, while commentary on the gameplay and difficulty was more mixed.

It was released on the PlayStation Store in Japan on November 11, 2009, and in North America on September 14, 2010.

== Gameplay ==
The player's "Apache" flies over the burning ruins of a building to attack an enemy structure, behind which enemy troops can be seen. The player's fuel, ammunition and armour levels can be seen at either side of the screen.

Soviet Strike is a helicopter-based shooter game. As in its predecessors, the player views the action from outside his craft, using one of two available viewpoints. These are similar to the isometric perspective of the previous games, but are improved "overhead" versions. This removes the predecessors' problem of buildings occasionally obstructing the player's view; and unlike the previous games, the player can no longer collide the helicopter into structures, instead always flying over them. The first camera system fixates on the Apache, while the second allows the player to rotate the screen around the helicopter. The Apache is armed with a machine gun, Hydra rockets and Hellfire missiles, which vary in power and payload. The Sega Saturn version includes two hidden power-up weapons: doubled machine guns and Maverick missiles. The craft has finite ammunition, fuel, and armour, and the player must manage the payload by collecting limited supplies.

The game has five large levels, each divided into several missions. Mission objectives include seeking and destroying enemy personnel and structures such as radars, training camps and ships; rescuing prisoners-of-war and other persons (including, in the last mission, Boris Yeltsin), as well as recovering intercontinental ballistic missiles and capturing enemy commanders and agents. Soviet Strike employs a relatively realistic, fluid virtual battlefield and sophisticated artificial intelligence, which will put in motion set pieces even if the protagonist has not arrived to take part. The opposing intelligence can track the player using radar and reinforce positions accordingly. As such the player must sometimes pre-emptively destroy radars. Enemy troops may also flee once they have lost a battle. Some missions require set piece solutions, including starting an avalanche to crush a tank battalion and sealing a nuclear reactor core in a salt mine. The game is very tightly structured, yet the player has the ability to roam the battlefield attacking enemies at will.

== Plot ==
=== Characters ===
The player is a helicopter pilot in STRIKE, a special covert operations force of the US military designed for preemptive action to prevent "wars that never happen." STRIKE's commander is General Earle. Major STRIKE personnel include electronics expert Hack and agent Andrea Grey, whose cover job is a news reporter. The other protagonists are STRIKE pilot Nick Arnold, guerrilla fighter Amad, and former Soviet Army pilot Ivan Uralia. The game's antagonists are former KGB Chairman Uri "Shadowman" Vatsiznov, Ireki dictator Sadissa Savak, and disgraced Soviet scientist Dr Grymyenko Ukrainian.

A series of voiceovers called STRIKE Files outline the origins of STRIKE. One such file has the Security Czar detailing the organization's mandate to US President Bill Clinton after his inauguration in January 1993. In the tape, Clinton is unaware that STRIKE prevented a civil war in Mexico in 1982 which could have turned the country into a secret Warsaw Pact member-state.

=== Plot ===
The end of the Soviet Union leaves a power vacuum in Eastern Europe that former KGB Chairman Uri Vatsiznov, a.k.a. the Shadowman, is willing to exploit for his own ends. In the first mission, which takes place in Crimea, the player must rescue a captured STRIKE pilot named Nick Arnold. The second level is set in the Sea of Azov: the player must battle the elements of the Black Sea Fleet which is preparing to invade Europe. The mission also involves the rescue of guerrilla fighter Amad.

STRIKE's victory in the Black Sea leads them to the Caucasus, where Sadissa Savak, leader of the fictional state of Irek, begins aggressive overtures against local fighters. In the mission (which is supposedly north of the main battle area where Desert Strike took place), the player and Amad join forces with a militia run by Amad's relatives in stopping Ireki troops from capturing an abandoned Soviet chemical weapons plant. With STRIKE killing Savak (and passed off as the victim of a car crash), the group goes to a heavily irradiated Transylvania to rescue Nick once more, this time from Dr Grymyenko Ukrainian, who wields an arsenal of ballistic missiles. The player is also tasked to kill the Shadowman's lead armor commander, Vila, who operates a special red-turreted T-80, and aid in the destruction of an abandoned nuclear reactor the Shadowman is planning to use.

The final mission takes place in Moscow, with the Shadowman unleashing his minions in the KGB, the military and the Russian mafia in attempting a coup against President Boris Yeltsin's government. The player must prevent a bombing on the Kremlin before seeking out and killing the Shadowman. The game's end sequence depicts Andrea delivering a televised news report blaming the destruction on an earthquake and consequent gas fires.

== Development ==
Soviet Strike began development as a game for the 3DO under the working title of 32-bit Strike. Strike series creator Mike Posehn assisted in early programming and the design but otherwise did not wish to work as part of a large team, necessitated by the move to a more advanced console. The development team, who had already spent several months working on the 3DO version, decided to rework it instead as a PlayStation game when it was clear that the 3DO's demise was inevitable; an additional two years' labor time was the result. The team re-evaluated the basics of the 16-bit games and aimed to create more lifelike environments and enemy behaviour. The 3D engine - created by the Road Rash 3DO team - used satellite images of real topography, imposed on polygonal maps. It also modified the preceding isometric viewpoint - which caused buildings to obstruct the player's view - to an overhead perspective with which the player could move and see over terrain and structures. In order to ensure proper spatial relations and unit placement, the team built three dimensional reliefs of each mission on sheets of plywood. Unlike some of its predecessors, Soviet Strike features only a helicopter - albeit with power-ups in some levels - and the team also abandoned the unpopular on-foot levels found in Urban Strike. The developers aimed to include more humour in the game, with other additions being voice-overs and full motion video.

The later Saturn version featured a number of changes: an optional easy difficulty setting (providing the player with twice the fire-power and slower fuel consumption), adjustable brightness on the heads-up display; two hidden powerful weapons; hundreds of bug fixes from the PlayStation version; extra sound effects added to helicopters; improvements to the graphics of control and menu screens and compass; and more improvised fuel added to level 4. It was also compatible with the Saturn's then-recent analogue controllers. The game was followed by a further sequel, Nuclear Strike, released in late 1997.

== Reception ==
Reception

Review scores
| Publication | Score |
|---|---|
| Edge | 7/10 |
| Electronic Gaming Monthly | 9/10, 7.5/10, 8.5/10, 7.5/10 (PS) |
| GameSpot | 5.5/10 (PS) |
| Hyper | 90% |
| IGN | 8/10 (PS) |
| Next Generation | 4/5 (PS) |
| Sega Saturn Magazine | 90% (SAT) |

Soviet Strike has an aggregate review score of 76.30% on Gamerankings for the PlayStation release, based on five reviews.

Reviewers praised the realism of the terrain graphics. Next Generation said that "the game makes a giant leap forward in terms of the environment" but called the explosions "average", while other reviewers found them impressive. Jeff Gerstmann said the vehicles "look good", while IGN called the structures "highly realistic". Next Generation felt the structures and vehicles together with the terrain formed an "impressive" environment. The magazine felt the animation was "average", and several other reviewers said that it sometimes gets choppy. GameFan's Saturn review summarised the graphics as "first-rate", while Russian magazine Great Drakon also praised them.

Critics called the full motion video stylish, and praised the acting. Gerstmann said the FMV had "some of the best CD-ROM acting seen in a long time" and called it the game's "only real plus". Hyper favorably described the sequences as a mixture of "the dark bits of The X-Files and the explosiveness of any big budget action flick". Edge noted the new video but felt it was "over-the-top" and intrusive, while others disagreed. GamePro compared the FMV to Desert Storm if reported by MTV, saying its "hip new attitude" was "part of the charm", while Sega Saturn Magazine said the sequences "spice up the proceedings a fair bit". Reviewing the Saturn version, GameFan noted a poorer quality of FMV than in the PlayStation version. Gerstmann felt the sound to be "dull", while Next Generation called it "exemplary". Others praised the quality of the gunfire sound effects, and noted humour in the enemy troops' utterances.

Gerstmann said it consisted of "a raw collection of messy operations", while Edge praised the game's "inventiveness" - saying it "makes Soviet Strike" - as well as the variety added by the games artificial intelligence. The magazine also felt that while the collecting of supplies added strategy to the action, the limited amount restricted the paths the player might take through the level. Next Generation said the "real-time, living battlefield enhances the urgency of the missions and the player's involvement" and also noted "practically no load time".

GameFan complained of a high difficulty and a steep curve, long levels which return the player to the beginning should he die, infrequent opportunities to repair armour and the enemies' tendency to attack the player from beyond his limited viewpoint, and was thankful for the Saturn version's optional easier difficulty setting. Next Generation also criticised the player's restricted view, calling it the game's "worst problem". One reviewer said revisiting levels to discover missed set pieces aided the game's longevity; Sega Saturn Magazine had "some reservations" about the game's replay-value, with only 5 missions, but said it was "very playable and enjoyable", while GamePro called it "a load of fun". Gerstmann criticised the poor scrolling, erratic motion and imprecise control, Great Drakon praised the controls, while GameFan noted they had improved in the Saturn version. The reviewer also enjoyed this version's new weaponry. Next Generation pointed to some "minor flaws", saying the HUD "smacks of 16-bit era graphics"; GamePro said the game's one flaw was the lack of an HUD map to save the player the trouble of hitting pause whenever they need to check their position. The game impressed Great Drakon's reviewer, who praised the attention to detail and the reviewer found the story convincing. IGN said: "Everything about this game is great. Excuse me for gushing, but when you come across a game that's as fun to play as Soviet Strike, and great looking, you really sit up and take notice."

Gerstmann called the quality FMV "a small victory in a larger conflict", saying the game had "too many little problems to recommend it" and that it "simply doesn't play as well as the old 16-bit Strike games." Sega Saturn Magazine called it a "worthy addition" to the series and also noted improvements to the Saturn version. They named it their "Game of the Month". GameFan said the game "is everything you could wish for from a 32bit Strike" and that "it plays brilliantly, and exercises both your trigger finger and grey matter." The magazine later reflected that the Saturn version was somewhat better but nevertheless very similar to the PlayStation original. It recommended the game to Strike fans but felt it would be an "in at the deep end" introduction for newcomers to the series. Edge summarised: "this is a fairly well-engineered continuation of the four-year-old Strike series", which retains the gameplay of the original but updates the graphics to true 3D. Scary Larry of GamePro felt the game might be too slow for fans of faster paced action games, but recommended it for players of previous instalments in the series. Air Hendrix of the same magazine called it "An outstanding mix of white-knuckle combat and challenging strategy". Allgame later felt: "The series peaked with the release of Soviet Strike."
