= Desert Strike =

1992 video game

- European Mega Drive cover art featuring an Apache helicopter
- Developers: Electronic Arts; Foresight New Media (DOS); Ocean Software (GB)
- Publishers: Electronic Arts: WW: Electronic Arts (MD/GEN, SNES); JP: Electronic Arts Victor (MD, SFC) Domark (MS, GG) Gremlin Interactive (DOS) Malibu Games/Ocean Software (GB)
- Producer: Richard Robbins
- Designers: Mike Posehn; John Manley
- Programmer: Mike Posehn
- Artists: Paul Vernon; Gary Martin; Amy Hennig
- Composers: Brian Schmidt; Rob Hubbard
- Series: Strike
- Platforms: Genesis, Amiga, MS-DOS, Mac OS, Master System, Lynx, Game Gear, Game Boy, Super NES, Game Boy Advance, PlayStation Portable (Note: Desert Strike was released in 2006 as part of the EA Replay compilation, which included Jungle Strike.)
- Release: March 1992: Genesis/Mega Drive; NA/EU: March 1992; JP: April 23, 1993; Super NES; NA: October 1992; JP: March 26, 1993; EU: May 1993; Amiga; EU: 1993; Atari Lynx; WW: 1993; MS-DOS; WW: 1994; Master System; EU: November 1993; Game Gear; WW: January 1994; Game Boy; WW: February 1995
- Genre: Shoot 'em up
- Mode: Single-player

Desert Strike: Return to the Gulf is a shoot 'em up video game released by Electronic Arts (EA) in 1992 for the Sega Genesis. The game was released on several other formats such as the Super Nintendo Entertainment System, including a much upgraded version for the Amiga home computer. The game was inspired by the Gulf War and depicts a conflict between an insane Middle Eastern dictator, General Kilbaba, and the United States. The player controls an Apache helicopter and attempts to destroy enemy weapons and installations, rescue hostages and capture enemy personnel, while managing supplies of fuel and ammunition.

Lead designer Mike Posehn had no video game experience prior to developing Desert Strike. Inspired by Choplifter, he aimed to create a nonlinear game with smoothly animated vehicles. Posehn developed a camera system with momentum to mimic realistic helicopter movements. Three-dimensional (3D) modeling was used to generate the vehicle sprites, which were later touched up on the pixel level with color.

Desert Strike was a commercial success: it was a chart-topping best seller and at the time Electronics Arts' highest selling game. The game also received a favourable critical response, with several magazines awarding scores of over 90%. Reviewers praised the game's enjoyability, mix of action and strategy, graphics and sound. There was controversy regarding the game's subject matter, with commentators criticising it as in poor taste due to the proximity of its release to the recently concluded Gulf War.

== Gameplay ==
The player's Apache helicopter (center) engages anti-aircraft weapons (center right) in order to destroy the grounded aircraft.

Desert Strike is a shoot 'em up game in which the player pilots an AH-64 Apache helicopter (albeit modified with a Fenestron rotor). The game is less frantic than typical shoot 'em ups, with the addition of greater strategic elements. The action takes place on open, multi-directional scrolling levels viewed from an isometric perspective. The player views the action from outside the helicopter, rather than from within the cockpit.

Levels consist of several missions, which are based around the destruction of enemy weapons and installations, as well as rescuing hostages or prisoners of war, or capturing enemy personnel. The Apache is armed with a machine gun, more powerful Hydra rockets and yet more deadly Hellfire missiles. The more powerful the weapon, the fewer can be carried: the player must choose an appropriate weapon for each situation. Enemy weapons range from soldiers with small arms, to anti-aircraft missiles to tanks and armored cars.

The player's craft has a limited amount of armor, which is depleted as the helicopter is hit by enemy fire. Should the armor reach zero, the craft will be destroyed, costing the player a life. The player must outmaneuver enemies to avoid damage, but can replenish armor by means of power-ups or by airlifting rescued friendlies or captives to a landing zone. The helicopter has a finite amount of fuel which is steadily depleted over time. Should the fuel run out the Apache will crash, again costing the player a life. The craft can refuel by collecting fuel barrels: the player must therefore plan mission routes carefully in order to maximize efficiency. The helicopter also carries limited ammunition, which must be replenished by means of ammo crates.

== Plot ==
The game opens with a self-proclaimed general named Kilbaba invading one of his neighbors, a small but wealthy emirate in the Persian Gulf. Installing himself as dictator, Kilbaba quickly begins fortifying his position with military weapons and installations, including facilities for building nuclear bombs. The United States decides to send in a single helicopter, piloted by the player's unnamed character and aided by a co-pilot, to infiltrate and destroy Kilbaba's forces in a series of swift strikes.

Altogether, four missions need to be resolved:

- In the first level (Air Superiority), the player must destroy several enemy airstrips and their support facilities, as well as liberate an exposed pro-American spy who holds important information about Kilbaba's next plans.
- The next mission (Scud Buster) entails locating and destroying a chemical weapons plant and a number of scud launchers wielding chemically charged missiles, and evacuate local and American non-combatants and P.O.W.s.
- The third mission (Embassy City) revolves around rescuing a U.N. inspection team, destroying a biological weapons plant and those bio-warhead missiles ready for deployment, as well as rescuing a large number of hostages, including the personnel from a local American embassy. Upon completion, the player is ordered to eliminate Kilbaba, who has been spotted partying on his private yacht. The player learns the yacht is heavily guarded and triggers a firefight; giving Kilbaba a chance to flee to freedom.
- In the final stage (Nuclear Storm), the player must – among other things – prevent the destruction of a major oil production facility, disable a nuclear power plant and several finished parts for nuclear weapons, and finally take down Kilbaba himself. However, Kilbaba has anticipated this attack, and has ordered nuclear material shipped in garbage trucks alongside garbage trucks that are engaging in legitimate duties in an attempt to confuse the player. After attacking the nuclear plant, the player captures a scientist who reveals that he produced a few bombs and shipped them to a bomber plane, where Kilbaba is on board and will attempt to use the bombs as a last-ditch effort. The player must then race to an airfield and stop the bomber plane prior to takeoff. A scene is then shown of Kilbaba perishing in the burning plane, and the player must safely return to the landing zone.
- The ending scene shows the pilot and copilot at the Rose Garden of the White House, being met by President and Mrs. Bush. President Bush gives the pilot a hearty congratulations.

The game's plot was felt by commentators to be a thinly disguised reference to the Gulf War; comparisons were drawn between Kilbaba and Saddam Hussein, as well as between the game's unnamed desert setting and Iraq.

== Development and release ==
The game was developed by a team headed by Mike Posehn. Posehn had previously worked for Electronic Arts (EA) as a software developer in the 1980s. Soon after leaving EA, he obtained a publishing deal with the company for Deluxe Video. The success of the software spurred Posehn to branch out and experiment with a flight simulator titled Fly for the IBM Personal Computer; however, International Business Machines cancelled the project. Posehn later met with EA president Trip Hawkins who suggested that Posehn develop a game for the Genesis, which was soon to be released. He also recommended that Posehn create a game similar to the Apple II game Choplifter; Hawkins felt flying a helicopter and rescuing people was "cool".

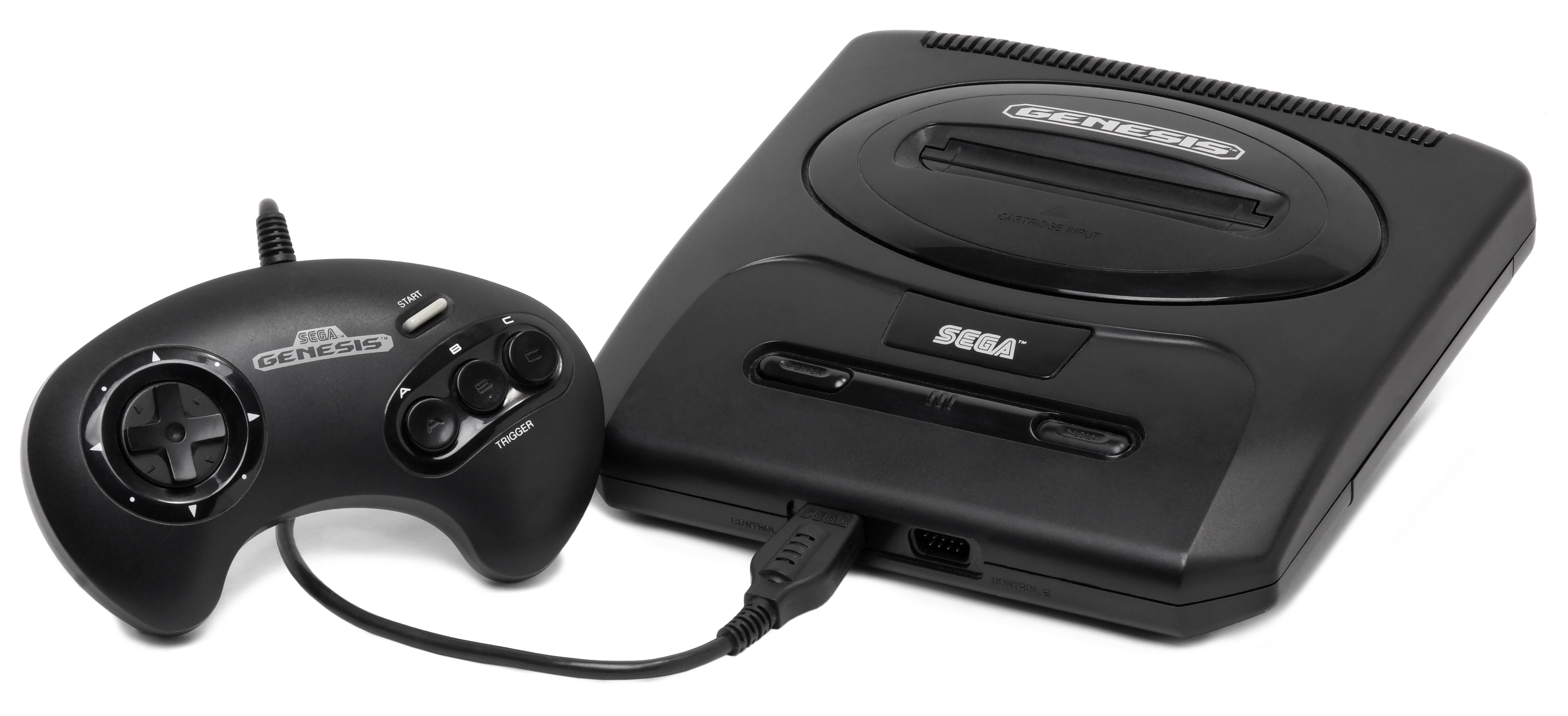
The team developed the game for the Sega Genesis console (pictured), known as the Mega Drive outside North America, after Mike Posehn met with Trip Hawkins, the president of EA at the time.

Desert Strike underwent few changes from the plans outlined in the original design documents. The initial concept involved smoothly animated vehicles on an isometric playing field. The developers also aimed to include cinematic scenes, similar to The Revenge of Shinobi's introduction sequence. The game began development before any discussion of an American invasion of Iraq, originally based on the Lebanese Civil War and titled Beirut Breakout; this was later changed to the Persian Gulf region. John Manley, an EA employee who assisted Posehn, recalled, "We actually wrote most of Desert Strike before Desert Shield happened. We were watching CNN at three in the afternoon and all of a sudden it was like, 'Oh my god – it's happening!'" A special point system intended to punish players was omitted; the system would have deducted points from the player's score if they destroyed objects that resulted in negative economic and political results. The control scheme was not well received at internal reviews of the game's early versions, and Posehn had to alter his original design to obtain approval for further development.

Manley assisted writing the game's program. He and Posehn collaborated to create the game's sandbox format, which they nicknamed "SNAFU". Posehn wanted the game to have nonlinear gameplay, whereas Manley felt a storyline and puzzles would help the player progress. Posehn disliked common gameplay elements like series of bosses and power-ups. As a compromise, the developers included only power-ups to replenish ammunition, armor, and other helicopter resources. To provide the player with options, the SNAFU system was designed to allow players to complete side missions in addition to main objectives. If the player alters the game scenario so that the objectives cannot be completed, the game instructs the player to reset the mission by returning to base.

Inspired by Matchbox toys he played with as a child, Posehn decided to make the size of the game sprites resemble toys. Posehn contacted his friend, Tim Calvin, to assist with designing and creating the vehicle sprites. Though Calvin was a practicing dentist at the time, he also had experience with 3D modelling. He rendered 3D models on a computer and reduced them to the desired size. Different views were obtained by rotating the models along a single axis. Calvin added color to the sprites to meet the production staff's specifications; most required black, white, red, and blue, as well as four shades of colors like green and brown. Calvin eventually felt the rendering process was a waste of resources and attempted to create sprites on the pixel level himself without 3D models. The developers, however, preferred the sprites created from the models over Calvin's freestyle ones.

Posehn had a difficult time working within the Genesis's output resolution of 320×240. He wanted to show as much of the playing field as possible without losing the details of the sprites; he felt a lack of graphical detail would make them less interesting. Posehn developed a dynamic camera system to help maintain what he felt was the right balance between the size of the field in view and the size of the game objects. The camera travels on an elliptic curve as the helicopter rotates to change the direction it travels, which puts whatever is in front of the helicopter more in view on screen. Posehn also integrated momentum to the camera movements to smooth transitions. He spent several months working on the physics for the screen and helicopter to ensure realistic movement. Instead of using completely accurate physics, Posehn chose to model movement that he believed players would assume a helicopter would have. He believed players would be put off by physics that didn't match their perceived movement.

After the success of the Genesis/Mega Drive version, work began on a conversion for the Amiga, with Gary Roberts (known for a John Madden Amiga conversion) and David Colclough (responsible for Myth) in charge of development. The developers retouched and redrew the graphics as well as added sound effects taken from military training videos. Conversions for other systems include the Atari Lynx, Super Nintendo Entertainment System, Master System, Game Gear, and Game Boy. The game was ported to the Game Boy Advance in 2002 as Desert Strike Advance, and was re-released in 2006 for the PlayStation Portable as part of a budget compilation.

== Reception ==
Reception

Aggregate score
Aggregator	Score
GameRankings	77.75%(Genesis); 77.33%(SNES); 69.80%(GBA); 65%(GB)

Review scores
Publication	Score
Computer and Video Games	92% (Genesis)
Electronic Gaming Monthly	7/10, 7/10, 6/10, 8/10 (SNES); 5/10, 5/10, 4/10, 5/10 (Lynx); 7/10, 6/10, 6/10, 7/10, 7/10 (Game Boy)
Mean Machines	94%
MegaTech	93%
Amiga Action	90%
Amiga Computing	93%
Amiga Format	87%
CU Amiga	93%
The One	93%

Award
Publication	Award
MegaTech (1991)	Hyper Game Award

Desert Strike was an immediate commercial success, going straight to the top of sales charts. The game remained a top-10 best seller for months after its release, and was at the time Electronic Arts' highest selling game ever. In the United Kingdom, Desert Strike topped the Mega Drive sales chart following its release and remained commercially successful into the following year, reaching number one on the ELSPA/Gallup computer games chart in May 1993.

Mean Machines praised the sophistication and tactical freedom found in the game, as well as its longevity and graphics. The magazine deemed it one of the best shooters on the Mega Drive thus far, as well as the best game released for the console that month. Computer and Video Games felt the game's subject matter was somewhat in bad taste, but praised its depth, soundtrack and sound effects. The magazine felt the game was "essential" for Mega Drive owners. ACE praised the balance of action and strategy, as well as the variety of missions. The magazine felt some of the graphics, particularly the explosions, were a little weak and complained that the fact that the helicopter is not fully rearmed and refuelled after the loss of a life was unduly frustrating. MegaTech magazine praised the graphics and gameplay, and said it was "one of the best shoot 'em ups on the Megadrive". Retro Gamer included this "thinking man's shoot-'em-up" among top ten Mega Drive games.

Amiga Action felt the game was not particularly innovative, but praised its open-ended gameplay, graphics and sound. The reviewer claimed the Amiga version of the game ran more slowly than the Mega Drive version but overall felt the port was "a more than satisfactory translation". Amiga Computing noted the improved graphics and sound over the Mega Drive version and praised the game as "EA's finest moment since Populous". The reviewer also acclaimed the game's "brilliant playability". Amiga Format commended the "Successful cross between a shoot 'em up and a flight simulator", graphics, sound, varied missions and "tremendous fun" of the game, although the reviewer noted some "occasional glitches" occurring in the sound and graphics. CU Amiga praised the Amiga version's improved graphics and sound, particularly the explosions, though the reviewer derided friendly units' invincibility as unrealistic and complained of poor enemy artificial intelligence. The magazine however said that "All things considered, Desert Strike couldn't be a better game", praising the "fast and frantic" action and "just-one-more-go appeal". The One praised the mix of action and strategy as well as opining that the Amiga version was a strong improvement over the Mega Drive game. The magazine said the game "plays like a dream" and was "one of the best shoot 'em ups available for any games machine".

The four reviewers of Electronic Gaming Monthly gave varying praise to the Lynx version's controls and graphics, but concurred that on the smaller portable screen Desert Strike loses much of its impact and playability, as it is difficult to identify enemies or even see the bullets the player character fires.

GamePro gave the Game Boy version a positive review, saying it "has almost everything that made the original title great." They particularly praised the graphics and extensive, realistic sound effects, remarking that they were very impressive given the limitations of Game Boy cartridges. Mike Weigand of Electronic Gaming Monthly likewise deemed it "A fairly faithful portable version of the 16-Bit military classic."

Despite its commercial success, some commentators felt the game was an attempt to capitalize on then-recent, extensive news coverage of the Gulf War, which had focused on the use of advanced, impersonal weapons (such as aircraft and guided missiles) to destroy enemy weapons and installations. These critics considered the game's subject matter to be in bad taste, with one magazine even reporting an incident of veterans burning copies of the game.

In 2017, GamesRadar ranked Desert Strike 26th on their "Best Sega Genesis/Mega Drive games of all time." In 1995, Total! rated the game 78th on its Top 100 SNES Games summarizing: "A bit old but this is a classic. Top army games with a nice tasteless Gulf War setting." In 1996, Super Play listed Desert Strike 92nd in their Top 100 SNES Games of All Time.

== Legacy ==
Desert Strike was followed by four sequels Jungle Strike, Urban Strike, Soviet Strike, and Nuclear Strike that expanded on the basic gameplay it established. The design staff made efforts to retain game mechanics they felt embodied the core of the original. They believed removing those elements would result in a loss of focus of what attracted fans. As the series moved to more advanced consoles, Posehn became less involved in the programming side of development. Jungle Strike and Urban Strike, both released for the Genesis, featured additional vehicles and locations. Soviet Strike, released for the original PlayStation and the Sega Saturn in 1996, featured 3D graphics, as did Nuclear Strike, released on PC and PlayStation in 1997 and the Nintendo 64 in 1999. A fifth sequel provisionally titled Future Strike was planned, but the game was eventually released as Future Cop: LAPD, a mech-based shooter game. Fatima Al Qadiri, a musician who lived in Kuwait during Operation Desert Storm, recorded an EP of the same name based on her experience of playing the game Desert Strike a year after the war ended; it was released in October 2012 by Fade to Mind.
