= SCi Games =

British video game publisher

SCi Games Limited
- Formerly: The Sales Curve Limited (1988–1994); SCi (Sales Curve Interactive) Limited (1994–1996)
- Type: Public
- Traded as: LSE: SEG
- Industry: Video games
- Founded: 1988
- Founder: Jane Cavanagh
- Defunct: 2009
- Fate: Merged with Square Enix in 2009
- Successor: Square Enix Limited
- Headquarters: London, England
- Key people: Jane Cavanagh (chairwoman, 1988–2006; CEO, 1988–2008); Tim Ryan (chairman, 2006-2009); Phil Rogers (CEO, 2008-2009)
- Owner: Warner Bros Entertainment (20%)
- Number of employees: 900 (2008)
- Subsidiaries: Eidos Interactive

SCi Games Limited (formerly The Sales Curve Limited and SCi (Sales Curve Interactive) Limited) was a British video game publisher based in London. The company was founded in 1988 by Jane Cavanagh and floated on the stock exchange in 1996. In May 2005, holding company SCi Entertainment Group plc acquired Eidos plc, the parent company of publisher Eidos Interactive, and merged their operations by June 2006; that company was briefly renamed Eidos. It was acquired by Square Enix in March 2009 and subsequently absorbed in November of that year.

== History ==
Jane Cavanagh, formerly an executive for British Telecom's Telecomsoft division, founded The Sales Curve in 1988, following a trip to Japan that convinced her of the potential of the video game industry. Cavanagh established and ran the company without external funding, and owned 100% of the company's shares. The Sales Curve published its games under the label Storm and was renamed SCi (Sales Curve Interactive) in 1994. Its parent company, SCi Entertainment, floated on the Alternative Investment Market in 1996.

By February 1999, SCi Entertainment reported a turnover of £3.262 million. In February 2004, the company acquired Pivotal Games. In October 2004, SCi announced publishing agreements of its games for the Gizmondo handheld. In January 2005, SCi invested in Rocksteady Studios, acquiring 25.1% of the company's shares.

=== Eidos takeover ===
In April 2005, SCi entered into a £103 million bid for Eidos plc, the parent company of Eidos Interactive. Eidos was acquired by SCi in May 2005, and fully merged with SCi by June 2006 with the Eidos brand used for all future games. Following Eidos' acquisition, all executives of the acquired company resigned, and were replaced by SCi's management. In October 2005, SCi employed around 600 people. By February 2006, it was the largest video game company in Britain, when Robert Tchenguiz's Thorson Investments owned a 14.6% stake after acquiring a holding from Robert Bonnier. In December 2006, Warner Bros. started investing in SCi in exchange for granting game licences to Warner Bros. films to SCi. Warner Bros. owned 10.3% in September 2007.

In July 2006, Cavanagh stepped down as chairwoman of SCi, while remaining chief executive officer (CEO). She was replaced by Tim Ryan, formerly non-executive director, as non-executive chairman of the board. In the 2007 New Year Honours, Cavanagh was named Officer of the Order of the British Empire (OBE) for her services in the video game industry, particularly SCi. Cavanagh was ousted as CEO in January 2008, and left the company alongside her husband, Bill Ennis, and studio chief Rob Murphy; they are likely to get more than £1.5 million in compensation according to London Evening Standard. Following their departure, SCi's shares doubled in value. Phil Rogers succeeded Cavanagh as CEO and announced a restructuring plan in February, reducing the headcount mostly in the United Kingdom. On 2 December 2008, SCi filed for changing its name to Eidos, which was finalised the following day.

During 2008, the company raised £60 million at 35p a share. Warner Bros Entertainment increased its stake to 30 per cent of shares. Eidos shareholders approved the acquisition by Square Enix on 27 March 2009 at 32p a share, a valuation of just over £84 million. At that point, Warner's share had decreased to 20 per cent, while 35 per cent of total shareholding were on the backing part of the offer. Eidos was absorbed by Square Enix together in November of that year.

== List of games ==
Games developed and/or published
| Date | Title | Publisher(s) | Platform(s) | Ref. |
|---|---|---|---|---|
| 1989 | Shinobi | Sega | Personal computers | |
| 1989 | Gemini Wing | Tecmo | Personal computers | |
| 1989 | Silkworm | Tecmo | Personal computers | |
| 1989 | Big Run | Jaleco | Personal computers | |
| 1990 | Narc | Ocean Software | Personal computers | |
| 1990 | The Ninja Warriors | Virgin Mastertronic | Personal computers | |
| 1991 | Double Dragon 3: The Rosetta Stone | Tradewest/The Sales Curve | Personal computers | |
| 1991 | Rod Land | The Sales Curve | Personal computers | |
| 1991 | SWIV | The Sales Curve | | |
| 1992 | Double Dragon 3: The Arcade Game | Acclaim Entertainment | Game Boy | |
| 1992 | Danny Sullivan's Indy Heat | The Sales Curve | Personal computers | |
| 1992 | Cover Girl Strip Poker | The Sales Curve | Personal computers | |
| 1992 | Super SWIV | The Sales Curve | SNES, Sega Genesis | |
| 1993 | Time Slip | Vic Tokai | SNES | |
| 1993 | The Lawnmower Man | The Sales Curve | SNES, Genesis, Game Boy, Sega CD | |
| 1994 | Cyberwar | Interplay Productions | MS-DOS, Mac, PlayStation | |
| 1996 | Kingdom O' Magic | | | |
| 1996 | XS | | | |
| 1996 | SWIV 3D | | Windows, MS-DOS | |
| 1998 | Star Trek Pinball | Interplay Entertainment | MS-DOS | |

Games published only
| Date | Title | Developer(s) | Platform(s) | Ref. |
|---|---|---|---|---|
| 1992 | Troddlers | Atod | Amiga | |
| 1993 | The Aquatic Games | Millennium Interactive | SNES | |
| 1996 | Gender Wars | The 8th Day | | |
| 1997 | Carmageddon | Stainless Games | | |
| 1999 | Live Wire! | The Code Monkeys | | |
| 1999 | Cool Bricks | Pukka Games | | |
| 2000 | Thunderbirds | Pukka Games | | |
| 2002 | Conflict: Desert Storm | Pivotal Games | | |
| 2003 | Rolling | Rage Software | | |
| 2004 | Richard Burns Rally | Warthog Games | PlayStation 2, Xbox, Windows, Gizmondo | |
| 2005 | Constantine (video game) | Bits Studios | PlayStation 2, Xbox, Windows | |

== See also ==
- NDreams
