= SWIV =

- Developer: The Sales Curve
- Publisher: Storm
- Platforms: Amiga, Atari ST, Acorn Archimedes, ZX Spectrum, Amstrad CPC, Commodore 64, MSX, Game Boy Color
- Release: 1991
- Genre: Scrolling shooter
- Modes: Single-player, multiplayer

SWIV is a 1991 vertically scrolling shooter video game developed and published by The Sales Curve. It was released for the Amiga, Atari ST, Commodore 64, MSX, ZX Spectrum, and Amstrad CPC computers. A Game Boy Color conversion was published in 2001.

The game was considered a spiritual successor to Tecmo's arcade game Silkworm, which The Sales Curve had previously converted to home computer formats in 1989. The game's heritage is evident from the game design whereby one player pilots a helicopter, and the other an armoured Jeep. SWIV is not an official sequel, as noted by ex-Sales Curve producer Dan Marchant: "SWIV wasn't really a sequel to Silkworm, but it was certainly inspired by it and several other shoot-'em-ups that we had played and loved."

According to the game's manual, "SWIV" was an acronym for "Special Weapons Interdiction Vehicle" and also short for "Silkworm IV", a lethal homing missile used by enemy units.

== Gameplay ==
SWIV is a 2D vertically scrolling shooter. The player chooses between using either a helicopter or a jeep at the beginning of the game and then plays in their chosen vehicles through scrolling levels, shooting at oncoming enemies. If two players are present, both vehicles will be used at once. Certain enemies when shot drop shield power-ups which can be either picked up to afford temporarily invincibility or detonated to destroy all enemies onscreen. Every so often a boss enemy will attack. The destruction of these bosses will give upgrades to the player's forward firing gun.

== Reception ==
Reception

Awards
Publication	Award
Sinclair User	SU Classic
Your Sinclair	Megagame

On release SWIV was met with positive reviews from most magazines of the time, receiving a 92% from Amiga Format magazine, an 88% from Commodore Format (C64 version) a 91% from Amiga Action, 90% from Computer and Video Games, and a 90% from Your Sinclair. It was ranked the 27th best game of all time by Amiga Power.

== Legacy ==
A sequel was published for the Super Nintendo Entertainment System as Super SWIV. It was ported to the Mega Drive as Mega SWIV. In 1997 SWIV 3D was released, with 3D terrain and models.
