= Strike (video game series) =

- Genre: Shoot 'em up
- Developer: Electronic Arts
- Publisher: Electronic Arts
- Platforms: Amiga, Amiga CD32, MS-DOS, Macintosh, Master System, Atari Lynx, Game Gear, Game Boy, Game Boy Advance, Nintendo 64, Sega Genesis, PC, PlayStation Network, PlayStation, PSP, Sega Saturn, Super NES
- First release: Desert Strike; March 1992
- Latest release: Nuclear Strike; 31 August 1997

Strike is a series of video games created by Mike Posehn, John Patrick Manley, and Tony Barnes released between 1991 and 1997 by Electronic Arts for a number of video game systems. The games are multi-directional shooters viewed from an overhead or top-down perspective. The first three games in the series were 2D and used isometric sprites to give the illusion of 3D depth. The series made the jump to real-time 3D graphics with the release of Soviet Strike which used a brand new engine built for fifth generation gaming consoles.

In the games, the player mainly controls a helicopter (although in the following titles some levels require the player to control other vehicles such as a hovercraft, an F-117 Nighthawk, a motorcycle and even on foot). The series is composed of five games, and was very popular during the 16-bit era, receiving critical acclaim for the games' strategic elements, gameplay, graphics, and sound. The last two games released on the PlayStation featured live-action cutscenes that reflected and explained events in the game.

== Overview ==
The player controls a helicopter - a Boeing AH-64 Apache or a similar type - equipped with three ammunition types, limited fuel, and armor. While there are refits for ammo, fuel, and armor scattered around the map, armor is more easily repaired by rescuing and delivering POWs, allied soldiers, or other passengers to a landing point. If either armor or fuel reaches zero, the aircraft crashes and a life is lost.

Levels are composed of several missions that can be completed in any order, but it is often better to complete them sequentially, as completing an earlier mission will make later ones easier. This is because the objectives of later missions are usually protected by a "Danger Zone" which gives enemies in the area increased weapon range, firepower, and damage as well as additional armor. A "Danger Zone" can be removed by the destruction of a radar or power plant, often the objective of an earlier mission. Later levels will often present only one mission that must be completed to reveal the next one. Missions can range from destruction of enemy targets, rescuing a MIA soldier who carries vital information, protecting friendly troops, capturing or eliminating an enemy leader, or delivery of friendlies or cargo to a drop zone. Between each level, cutscenes developing the story take place.

There are several kinds of enemies, from foot soldiers armed with rifles to powerful anti-aircraft systems and enemy helicopters. Generally, the player has no backup and must deal with the opponents on his own, though both Soviet Strike and Nuclear Strike incorporate missions involving large amounts of allies.

The player can lose a game in several ways: by losing all their lives or through an action that makes a mission impossible to complete. These include destroying a mission-critical object, killing someone who was to be captured or rescued, killing too many friendlies, allowing an objective to leave the battlefield, failing to protect a friendly target from being captured or destroyed, destroying your home base or landing zones, or waiting too long to complete a mission objective. After such an occurrence, the player must return to his home base, and the level restarts from the beginning. In Soviet Strike and Nuclear Strike, if a player fails to return, they are warned to return to base, and after three warnings, STRIKE shuts down the player's vehicle, and the level will be restarted.

The series was militaristic in nature, with each enemy sprite having a corresponding information section in the pause menu, relating details of the real-world weapon (or a fictionalized version, in the case of non-existent weapons, such as the Mohican helicopter from Urban Strike). The next-generation titles, Soviet Strike and Nuclear Strike, featured plots based heavily on present-day geopolitics, such as the instability of post-USSR states, or tensions at the DMZ between North and South Korea. However, in contrast, the games often displayed a quirky sense of humor, featuring numerous appearances by Elvis including outside a castle where he cannot be killed or even harmed; he just laughs at you and even Santa Claus, as well as wisecracks from the player character in the earlier games (in Urban Strike, the player's character, on being told the villain is an evil genius, comments, 'Great, another evil genius. Why can't I ever fight an evil idiot?') Although ostensibly serious in nature, the games were often quite tongue-in-cheek in their execution.

== Games ==
Title	Release	Platforms
Desert Strike	1992	Amiga, DOS, Macintosh, Master System, Atari Lynx, Game Gear, Game Boy, Game Boy Advance, Mega Drive/Genesis, Super NES, PSP (as part of EA Replay)
Jungle Strike	1993	Amiga, DOS, Game Gear, Game Boy, Mega Drive/Genesis, Super NES, Amiga CD32, PSP (as part of EA Replay)
Urban Strike	1994	Mega Drive/Genesis, Super NES, Game Gear, Game Boy
Soviet Strike	1996	PlayStation, Sega Saturn, PlayStation Network
Nuclear Strike	1997	PlayStation, PC, Nintendo 64, PlayStation Network

A Sega CD compilation called Super Strike Trilogy was demonstrated at the 1995 Electronic Entertainment Expo, but never released. It included Desert Strike, Jungle Strike, and Urban Strike.

Two new trademark filings for Desert Strike made in November 25, 2013 have been discovered on the U.S. Patent and Trademark Office's website. These list EA as the company filing for them but provide no additional information of substance or interest.

=== Future Strike ===
The final cutscene of Nuclear Strike includes a trailer for the next game in the series, Future Strike, including shots of a Mecha robot called 'Warrior' that could turn into a helicopter. Future Strike was never released, but development of the game evolved into Future Cop: LAPD, which features gameplay similar to the previous Strike games and a mech robot like the one seen in the Future Strike trailer that can turn into a police hovercar.

== Reception ==
The series was ranked as the 95th top game of all time by Next Generation in 1996, commenting that "rarely has a game series had such an on-target blend of action, strategy, and scenario." More than 2.7 million units of the Strike franchise have shipped by May 1997.

== See also ==
- G-Police
- LHX Attack Chopper
- Comanche (video game series)
