= Future Cop: LAPD =

1998 video game

- Developer: EA Redwood Shores
- Publisher: Electronic Arts
- Composer: Dave O'Neal
- Platforms: PlayStation; Windows; Mac OS
- Release: PlayStation: NA: September 16, 1998; EU: 1998; Windows, Mac OS: NA: November 25, 1998; EU: 1998 (Windows)
- Genre: Third-person shooter
- Modes: Single player, multiplayer

Future Cop: LAPD is a 1998 third-person shooter developed by EA Redwood Shores and published by Electronic Arts for PlayStation, Mac OS and Windows. It was originally developed as an installment of the Strike series.

In the game, players assume the role of a pilot for the X1-Alpha, a robot designed to fight in the "Crime War" in Los Angeles in the year 2098. The X1-Alpha is a police vehicle that can transform between a fast, hovering pursuit vehicle, and a slower, full-fledged combat mecha.

== Gameplay ==
There are two modes of play in the game, Crime War and Precinct Assault (both modes can be played either as single player or two player). Precinct Assault is a strategy mode that is similar to Herzog Zwei (except the player can actively help their armies get to the other base) and is well known for inspiring MOBA games like DotA and League of Legends.

=== Crime War Mode ===
Crime War is a story mode, following a day in the life of an LAPD X1-Alpha pilot. The story events range from rogue lunatics arming observatories with weapons, to a malfunctioning supercomputer. Players begin in a futuristic Griffith Park, but as they advance through the game they may unlock areas such as Venice Beach, LAX and Long Beach. Crime War also supports a second player in cooperative play. Cooperative play features the unique feature that the life bars of the two players are intertwined; if either player is destroyed, it counts as a failure for both players.

=== Precinct Assault Mode ===
Considered an early form of the MOBA genre by some, Precinct Assault is an arena battle mode in which each player starts with a single base and can capture automated Turrets or Outposts across the map. The objective is to defeat one's opponent by purchasing and deploying Hovertanks to invade their main base. The game ends when one player's base is breached by either a standard or super-sized "Dreadnought" Hovertank. Players may also deploy defensive Helicopters or the "Flying Fortress" Superplane to assist in securing their perimeter, shooting down enemy tanks that come near the base. Single-player mode consists of fighting a computer opponent named "Sky Captain", whose in-game avatar is a Superplane, more powerful and advanced than the X1-Alpha. Two player mode is a competitive battle between two X1-Alpha robots. There are five different precinct assault areas with 10 difficulty settings (for single player); however the level "La Cantina" was not on the original PlayStation release, only being added later for the computer versions. There is also a bonus area, known as 'Bug Hunt', which is the same as the 'Proving Ground' level, except all objects have been made into creatures such as worms and butterflies, instead of Hovertanks and Helicopters. The Flying Fortress is now a bat, and the Dreadnought is a large, armored caterpillar. The level features an up-beat music track in comparison to the game's normal dark military music and "Sky Captain" is a dragonfly.

The PC version also allowed for online competitive play,

== Reception ==
Reception

Aggregate score
Aggregator	Score		
Aggregator	Macintosh	PC	PS
GameRankings	N/A	80%	79%

Review scores
Publication	Score		
Publication	Macintosh	PC	PS
CNET Gamecenter	N/A	8/10	9/10
Computer Games Strategy Plus	N/A	3.5/5	N/A
Computer Gaming World	N/A	3.5/5	N/A
Electronic Gaming Monthly	N/A	N/A	7/10
Famitsu	N/A	N/A	29/40
Game Informer	N/A	N/A	8.5/10
GamePro	N/A	3.5/5 (Note: GamePro gave the PC version 4.5/5 for graphics, 3/5 for sound, and two 3.5/5 scores for control and overall fun factor.)	5/5 (Note: GamePro gave the PlayStation version three 4.5/5 scores for graphics, sound, and control, and 5/5 for overall fun factor.)
GameRevolution	N/A	N/A	B+
GameSpot	N/A	N/A	7/10
IGN	N/A	7.8/10	8.3/10
MacLife	"F.A."	N/A	N/A
Official U.S. PlayStation Magazine	N/A	N/A	3.5/5
PC Accelerator	N/A	7/10	N/A
PC Gamer (US)	N/A	76%	N/A

The game received favorable reviews on both platforms, according to the review aggregation website GameRankings. In Japan, where the PlayStation version was ported and published by Electronic Arts Square under the name Sōkō Kidōtai L.A.P.D. (装甲機動隊L.A.P.D.) on August 5, 1999, Famitsu gave it a score of 29 out of 40.

AllGame gave the PlayStation version four stars out of five, saying, "Fun? You bet! The bottom line is that Future Cop is the ticket for fans of the Strike series and those longing for a third person shooter with personality."

The Macintosh version was nominated for Best Macintosh Game at the 1998 CNET Gamecenter Awards, which went to Unreal.
