= List of 32X games =

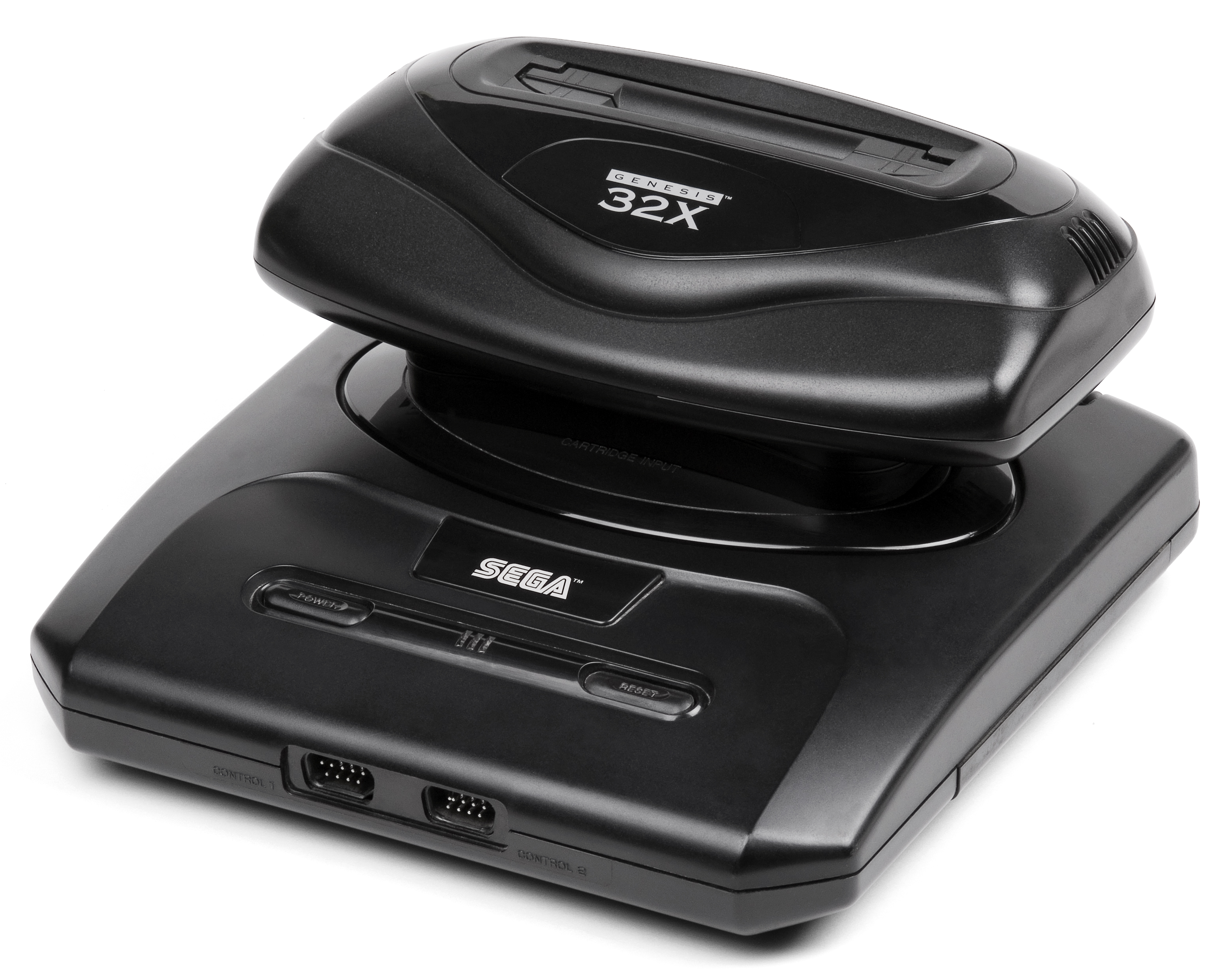
A 32X attached to a Sega Genesis

The 32X is an add-on for the Sega Genesis video game console. Codenamed "Project Mars", the 32X was designed to expand the power of the Genesis and serve as a holdover until the release of the Sega Saturn. Independent of the Genesis, the 32X used its own ROM cartridges and had its own library of games, as well as two 32-bit central processing unit chips and a 3D graphics processor. Despite these changes, the console failed to attract either developers or consumers as the Sega Saturn had already been announced for release the next year. In part because of this, and also to rush the 32X to market before the holiday season in 1994, the 32X suffered from a poor library of titles, including Genesis ports with minor improvements such as the number of colors that appeared on screen. Originally released at US$159, Sega dropped the price to $99 in only a few months and ultimately cleared the remaining inventory at $19.95. 800,000 units were sold worldwide.

There were 40 (Note: This number is always up to date by this script) games produced worldwide, including six that required both the 32X and the Sega CD add-ons, and ten that were only released in North America, as well as only one released exclusively for Brazil. Games that were announced or reported to be in development for the 32X, but never released, are listed at the list of cancelled 32X games.

Region code guide
Regions released	Region description
JP (Japan)	Japanese (NTSC-J) formatted release
NA (North America)	North America and other NTSC territories, besides Japan
PAL	PAL/SECAM territories: much of Europe, Australia, parts of Asia
BR (Brazil)	NTSC-U release in Brazil (some systems may output PAL-M, but all games are NTSC-U)

== Games ==
Title(s)	Requires Sega CD?	Developer(s)	Publisher(s)	Release date				Ref(s)
Title(s)	Requires Sega CD?	Developer(s)	Publisher(s)	JP	NA	PAL	BR	Ref(s)
After Burner Complete	No	Rutubo Games	Sega	January 13, 1995	January 1995	January 1995	Unreleased	
The Amazing Spider-Man: Web of Fire	No	BlueSky Software; Zono	Sega	Unreleased	March 1996	Unreleased	Unreleased	
BC Racers	No	Core Design	Front Street Publishing	Unreleased	June 1995	Unreleased	Unreleased	
Blackthorne	No	Blizzard Entertainment; Paradox Development	Sega; Tec Toy (Brazil)	Unreleased	September 1995	Unreleased	January 1996	
Brutal: Above the Claw	No	GameTek	GameTek	Unreleased	March 1995	Unreleased	Unreleased	
Corpse Killer	Yes	Digital Pictures	Digital Pictures	Unreleased	1994	1994	Unreleased	
Cosmic Carnage^{NA/PAL/BR} Cyber Brawl^{JP}	No	Almanic Corporation; ALU	Sega; Tec Toy (Brazil)	January 27, 1995	December 1994	February 1995	1995	
Darxide	No	Frontier Developments	Sega	Unreleased	Unreleased	January 1996	Unreleased	
Doom	No	id Software; Sega	Sega; Tec Toy (Brazil)	December 3, 1994	November 21, 1994	January 1995	1995	
Fahrenheit	Yes	Sega	Sega; Tec Toy (Brazil)	Unreleased	1995	Unreleased	1995	
FIFA Soccer 96	No	Extended Play Productions; Probe Entertainment	EA Sports	Unreleased	Unreleased	November 1995	Unreleased	
Golf Magazine: 36 Great Holes Starring Fred Couples	No	Flashpoint Productions	Sega; Tec Toy (Brazil)	February 24, 1995	January 1995	March 1995	1995	
Knuckles' Chaotix^{NA/PAL/BR} Chaotix^{JP}	No	Sega	Sega; Tec Toy (Brazil)	April 21, 1995	April 1995	June 23, 1995	1995	
Kolibri	No	Novotrade	Sega; Tec Toy (Brazil)	Unreleased	October 1995	November 17, 1995	January 1996	
Metal Head	No	Sega	Sega; Tec Toy (Brazil)	February 24, 1995	February 1995	April 1995	1995	
Mortal Kombat II	No	Probe Entertainment	Acclaim Entertainment; Tec Toy (Brazil)	May 19, 1995	March 1995	March 1995	1995	
Motocross Championship	No	Artech Studios	Sega	Unreleased	January 1995	March 1995	1995	
NBA Jam Tournament Edition	No	Iguana Entertainment	Acclaim Entertainment	September 1, 1995	1995	June 1995	Unreleased	
NFL Quarterback Club	No	Iguana Entertainment	Acclaim Entertainment	July 14, 1995	1995	July 1995	Unreleased	
Night Trap	Yes	Digital Pictures	Digital Pictures	Unreleased	January 1995	1995	Unreleased	
Pitfall: The Mayan Adventure	No	Activision; Big Bang Software; Zombie Virtual Reality Entertainment	Activision	Unreleased	October 1995	Unreleased	Unreleased	
Primal Rage	No	Probe Entertainment	Sega	Unreleased	November 14, 1995	March 1996	Unreleased	
R.B.I. Baseball '95	No	Time Warner Interactive	Time Warner Interactive	Unreleased	1995	Unreleased	Unreleased	
Sangokushi IV	No	Sega	Koei	July 28, 1995	Unreleased	Unreleased	Unreleased	
Shadow Squadron^{NA} Stellar Assault^{JP/PAL}	No	Sega	Sega	April 26, 1995	June 1995	June 1995	Unreleased	
Slam City with Scottie Pippen	Yes	Digital Pictures	Digital Pictures	Unreleased	1995	1995	Unreleased	
Space Harrier	No	Rutubo Games	Sega	December 3, 1994	January 1995	January 1995	Unreleased	
Star Trek: Starfleet Academy – Starship Bridge Simulator	No	Interplay; High Voltage Software	Interplay; Tec Toy (Brazil)	Unreleased	1995	Unreleased	1995	
Star Wars Arcade	No	Sega InterActive	Sega; Tec Toy (Brazil)	December 3, 1994	November 21, 1994	January 1995	March 1995	
Supreme Warrior	Yes	Digital Pictures	Digital Pictures	Unreleased	1995	1995	Unreleased	
Surgical Strike	Yes	The Code Monkeys	Tec Toy	Unreleased	Unreleased	Unreleased	1995	
T-MEK	No	Bits Corporation	Sega	Unreleased	1995	October 1995	Unreleased	
Tempo	No	Sega; Red Company	Sega; Tec Toy (Brazil)	March 24, 1995	1995	Unreleased	1995	
Toughman Contest	No	High Score Productions; Visual Concepts	EA Sports	Unreleased	May 1995	June 1995	Unreleased	
Virtua Fighter	No	Sega-AM2	Sega; Tec Toy (Brazil)	October 20, 1995	October 10, 1995	November 30, 1995	1995	
Virtua Racing Deluxe	No	Sega-AM2	Sega; Tec Toy (Brazil)	December 16, 1994	November 21, 1994	January 1995	March 1995	
World Series Baseball Starring Deion Sanders	No	Blue Sky Software	Sega	Unreleased	February 1996	Unreleased	Unreleased	
WWF Raw	No	Sculptured Software	Acclaim Entertainment	September 1, 1995	1995	September 1995	Unreleased	
WWF WrestleMania: The Arcade Game	No	Sculptured Software	Acclaim Entertainment	Unreleased	November 1995	Unreleased	Unreleased	
Zaxxon's Motherbase 2000^{NA} Motherbase^{PAL} Parasquad^{JP}	No	CSK Research Institute	Sega	July 14, 1995	June 1995	June 1995	Unreleased	

== See also ==
- List of cancelled 32X games
- List of Sega Genesis games
- List of Sega CD games
