= List of cancelled 32X games =

The 32X is an add-on to the Sega Genesis video game console that was designed as a cheaper, more incremental hardware alternative to the Sega Saturn. However, the dwindling of the aging Genesis market and the more advanced Saturn dwarfing it led to low sales and a very brief lifespan — launched in late 1994, it was discontinued by early 1996. Many games — even Sega's own — were cancelled simply because games were not able to be finished in this short time, with games either being moved on to the Saturn, or cancelled outright. This list documents games that were confirmed for release for the 32X at some point, but did not end up being released for it.

== Games ==
There are currently 68 games on this list. (Note: This number is always up to date by this script.)

List of cancelled 32X games
Title(s)	Notes/Reasons	Developer	Publisher
32 Xtreme	A collection of fantasy extreme sports games, such as "paintball snowboarding" and "garage roller hockey". The game was cancelled and was not revived for any future consoles, and is unrelated to Sony's 2 Xtreme and 3 Xtreme games in the late 1990s.	Sega	Sega
Aftershock	A game designed by the short-lived Sega division Sega Midwest Studio that was created to increase output of games for the Sega Genesis and 32X platforms. The game was planned to be an isometric action game in the vein of Battletech (1994) and Electronic Arts Strike series. A detailed 38 page game design document detailing its gameplay and post-apocalyptic characters and setting was created. The division was closed in January 1995, and while some of its members and projects were continued, the game was cancelled; the 32X's short-lifespan, and the game's ambitious scope, worked against its viability as a future project.	Sega Midwest Studio	Sega
Alone in the Dark	A 32X version of the 1992 PC game was announced at CES 1995, but never released.	Infogrames	Interplay Entertainment
Alien Trilogy	Development of the game originally started on the Sega CD and Sega 32X, and even had a release date of November 1994 at one point, but development was eventually moved to the more powerful platforms of the Sega Saturn and PlayStation 1, where it eventually released in 1996.	Probe Software	Acclaim Entertainment
Amok	Development originally started on the 32X in 1995, but was shifted to the Sega Saturn after the discontinuation of the 32X, where it released in 1996 alongside PC versions.	Lemon	Scavenger, Inc.
B.A.N.E.	The game was one of the Sega-developed games seen as the 32X's "second-wave of software" that was cancelled upon the quick termination of the platform in early 1996. The game involved maneuvering a tank that could adapt to whatever it touched.	Sega	Sega
Batman Forever	GamePro magazine reported a 32X version of the multiplatform game being present at E3 1995, but a 32X version never released.	Warner Bros.	Acclaim Entertainment
Beyond Zero Tolerance / Zero Tolerance 2	A sequel to the 1994 Sega Genesis title Zero Tolerance was announced for the Genesis and 32X, and scheduled for release in 1995, but was cancelled and never released for either platform. The game was later released onto the internet as freeware in the 2000s, and as part of the Zero Tolerance Collection on the Nintendo Switch in 2022.	Technopop	Accolade
Boogerman: A Pick and Flick Adventure	A port of the 1994 Sega Genesis game was announced by Interplay Entertainment, but the 32X version never materialized.	Interplay Entertainment	Interplay Entertainment
Bug!	After the success of porting Virtua Fighter to the 32X in 1995 after its 1994 Sega Saturn port, Sega was reportedly looking at other Saturn games to be ported to the 32X. A port of the 1995 Saturn game Bug! was announced in early 1996, but never released, with the 32X being discontinued shortly after.	Realtime Associates	Sega
Casper	A variety of video game adaptions of the 1995 film were released across many video game platforms; the 32X and Sega Genesis were announced as target platforms, but games of the franchise never released on either platform.	Funcom	Interplay Entertainment
Castlevania: The Bloodletting	Originally announced as a Castlevania entry for the Sega 32X, the platform's short lifespan lead to a shift to the Saturn and PlayStation platforms instead. The game was eventually cancelled, but some content was reworked into Castlevania: Symphony of the Night, which was released on PlayStation in 1997 and on Saturn in 1998.	Konami	Konami
ClayFighter 2: Judgment Clay	A port of the 1995 SNES game was announced for the 32X, but never released.	Interplay Entertainment	Interplay Entertainment
College Basketball's National Championship Hosted by Billy Packer	A college basketball game announced and made by Sega themselves, it would have featured scaling and camera rotation, which were uncommon in games for the time. While it was listed on release schedules across 1994 for release towards the end of the year, the game was never finished.	Sega	Sega
Converse Hardcore Hoops / Converse City Ball Tour	Announced at E3 1995 for the Saturn, Sega Genesis, Sega 32X, SNES, PlayStation 1, and PC, the game was reported far in development, but was cancelled and never released in any capacity. Despite a large budget and a then-impressive 15,000 frames of animations, the game reported garnered very negative reactions from test audiences, who did not like the game's half-court, two versus two set up.		Virgin Interactive
Cyberwar	A story sequel to the film The Lawnmower Man and its respective video game adaption, the game was announced for the 32X, Sega CD, Sega Saturn, and the 3DO, but only ever released on PlayStation 1 and PC platforms.		Sales Curve Interactive
DarkRide	Announced as a FMV game that played like a "psychedelic roller coaster" strategy game played from the first person perspective, it was announced for the 32X and Sega CD, and later shifted development to the Sega Saturn, but never ended up releasing on any platform.	Rocket Science Games	Rocket Science Games
Daytona USA	A port of the 1994 arcade game for the 32X and Sega Saturn was announced around the same time as the game's initial announcement. The 32X version was not present at the time of the 1995 Saturn release, but a 32X release was still reportedly possible into 1996, when Sega considered the possibility of more 32X ports after the success of Virtua Fighter on 32X in late 1995. However, the 32X was discontinued shortly thereafter.	Sega	Sega
Die Hard Trilogy	A video game adaption of the first three Die Hard films, development originally started off for the 32X and Sega Genesis, before development shifted to the Sega Saturn, PlayStation 1, and Windows, where it released across late 1996 and early 1997, well after the 32Xs lifespan.	Probe Entertainment	Fox Interactive
Descent	Released on PC platforms in 1995, the first console version was initially intended for the 32X. However, between the 32X's short lifespan, and difficulty in developing for the Saturn, the only console version that arose was for the PlayStation 1 in 1996.	Parallax Software	Interplay Entertainment
Dynamite Headdy	A version of the 1994 Sega Genesis game was announced to be in the works in Sega Power magazine shortly after the game's original release, but no further information ever materialized.	Treasure	Sega
Untitled Ecco the Dolphin title	Sega teased in 1994 that an entry in the Ecco the Dolphin series would release for the 32X, by creating a short tech demo using CinePak technology, and publications expected it to release in 1995, but no further details ever arose on the title.	Novotrade	Sega
Elite	A version of the 1984 PC game was in development for the Sega Genesis and 32X in 1994, but was delayed and eventually cancelled after Sony pulled out of publishing the game. The Genesis version featured polygonal graphics, and the 32X version featured greater detail in its graphics. In 2020, a demo of the Genesis version was released onto the internet by designer Ian Bell.	Hybrid Technology	Sony Imagesoft
Fever Pitch Soccer	A port of the 1995 Sega Genesis game was scheduled for 32X, but never materialized.		
Flying Aces / Wing Nuts: Battle in the Sky	Originally announced for Sega CD 32X platform, its short-lived lifespan lead to development shifting to Saturn, though it never released there or anywhere else either.		
Fractal Racer	Starting development on the 32X, development eventually shifted to the Sega Saturn, though the game never released in any capacity.	Core Design	
Garfield: Caught in the Act / Garfield in TV Land	A port of the 1995 Sega Genesis game, Garfield Caught in the Act, with the alternate title Garfield in TV Land, was scheduled for release for the 32X, but never materialized.	Sega, Novotrade	Sega
Heavy Machinery / Nitro Wrecks	A game that combined the gameplay of Outrun and Road Rash. In development across 1994 and 1995, it began under the name Nitro Wrecks for the Sega Genesis. Development later shifted to the 32X and the game received a name change to Heavy Machinery. The game never released for either platform due to the discontinuation of both platforms.	Zyrinx	Sega
HyperBlade / Hockeydrome	Originally announced as Hockeydrome, a futuristic, ultraviolent version of the sport of hockey for the 32X, Sega Saturn, and the original PlayStation, by the time the game was released under its final name, HyperBlade, in November 1996, only a version for Windows was released.	Wizbang! Software Productions	Activision
Izzy's Quest for the Olympic Rings	A port of the 1995 Sega Genesis game was scheduled for 32X, but never materialized.	Alexandria	U.S. Gold
Jet Ski Rage	A game that involved racing jet skis and fighting opponents from the first person perspective. Subsequently, in development for the Sega CD, 32x, and Sega Saturn, it never ended up releasing for any platform.	Velocity Software	
Judge Dredd	Released in 1995 for the Sega Genesis, Super NES, and PC platforms, expanded versions for the 32X, Sega Saturn, and the original PlayStation were announced, but never materialized.	Probe Software	Acclaim Entertainment
Kingdom: The Far Reaches / Thayer's Quest	After Sega announced that Capitol Multimedia was officially signed on to develop 32X games, one their first announcements was that 32X was one of the consoles that would receive ports of the arcade game Thayer's Quest under the new name Kingdom: The Far Reaches. However, the 32X version never materialized.	Capitol Multimedia	RDI Video Systems
Midnight Raiders	Released for the Sega CD across 1994 and 1995, a 32X version was announced, but never materialized.	Stargate Productions	Sega
Mission Impossible	When Ocean Software first announced they had acquired the rights to create a video game adaption of the 1996 Mission Impossible film in 1996, announced platforms included the 32X, Sega Genesis, Sega Saturn, and the SNES. However, a lengthy development period delayed it well beyond most of the platform's lifespans, leading to it only releasing on the Nintendo 64 and PlayStation 1 by the time of its 1998 release.	Ocean Software	Infogrames
NBA Action	An entry of Sega's NBA Action series was announced for 32X. Announced in between the vastly different Sega Genesis and Sega Saturn iterations, no footage was ever released of the game, making it difficult to discern if it was a variant or original game.	Sega Sports	Sega
NFL Football Trivia Challenge	One of the first games announced after Capitol Multimedia signed on to be a 32X software developer was NFL Football Trivia Challenge, a game with over 1500 NFL related questions voiced by commentary Pat Summerall. However, only the Sega CD version ever released.	Capitol Multimedia	
Out Run	A port of the arcade game Out Run was reported to be in development by GameFan magazine, but never materialized. Ports arrived on the Sega Genesis and Sega Saturn instead.	Sega	Sega
Pinocchio	Development of the game started in 1994, and was scheduled for release in September 1995, but the game was delayed over a year until late 1996, delaying it out of the 32X's lifespan. Sega Genesis and SNES versions still released.	Virgin Interactive Entertainment	Sega
Power Drift	A port of the arcade game Power Drift was reported to be in development subsequently for the Sega Genesis, Sega CD, and 32X, but none ever materialized. Ports later arrived on the Sega Saturn and Sega Dreamcast instead.	Sega AM2	Sega
Prime Time Football '96	A 32X iteration of the Sega Genesis game of the same name was announced, but never released. While no footage of it was ever released, its advertisements noted improvements over the Genesis version, including a fully 3D playing field, and player character models up to 4 times as large as Genesis football games.	FarSight Technologies	Sega
Race Drivin'	The 1990 arcade game was announced for a large number of home console and PC platforms; a 32X version was reported upon by Game Players magazine in 1994, but never materialized, despite a Sega Genesis version releasing the year prior in North America, and a Sega Saturn version releasing in Japan the following year.	Polygames	Tengen
Rap Jam: Volume One	A basketball game featuring rappers as playable characters, the game was announced for SNES, Sega Genesis, and the 32X, though only the SNES version ever materialized upon its release in 1995. The 32X version was planned to have an exclusive bonus character, Eazy-E.	64WD Creation	Motown Games
Ratchet and Bolt	Began development as early as 1991 for the Sega Genesis, but its ambition lead to it being pushed to the 32X and its stronger processing power. The game involved controlling 2 police officers, "Ratchet" and "Bolt", who would mix and match different weapon types to defeat oncoming enemies. Featured 2D characters in a 3D environment. The game was one of the Sega-developed games seen as the 32X's "second-wave of software" that was cancelled upon the quick termination of the platform in early 1996. The game is unrelated to Sony's similarly named Ratchet and Clank series.	Sega	Sega
Rayman	Throughout the game's lengthy planning and development period in the late 1980s and early 1990s, the game was planned for a number of platforms that it never released on, including the 32X, SNES, and 3DO.	Ubi Soft	Ubi Soft
Return Fire	Console ports of the arcade game were announced for 32X and Sega Saturn, though both versions never released. The 32X version was mentioned once in Mean Machines.	Electronic Arts	Electronic Arts
Revolution X	Console ports of the arcade game were announced for 32X, Sega Genesis, and Sega Saturn, though the 32X version never released. The 32X version was far enough along to be demoed at E3 1995.	Midway Games	Acclaim Entertainment
Rocket Boy	An isometric action platformer game with pre-rendered 3D graphics in the vein of SegaSonic the Hedgehog (1993) and Sonic 3D Blast (1996), following a boy and his dog navigating a hostile alien planet. Originally in development for the Sega CD, the developer's lack of commercial success in releasing games for the platform lead for development to be moved to the 32X and later the Sega Saturn before its ultimate cancellation. Prior to its cancellation, it had been scheduled for a late 1995 release on the Saturn, but the game had been put on hold due to its developers feeling it was too similar to other games they observed at CES 1995. They later closed down entirely in 1997.	Rocket Science Games	Rocket Science Games
SegaSonic the Hedgehog	A Sonic the Hedgehog arcade game with a relatively limited release. A 32X version of the game was reported by magazines as being in development, but never materialized. While no official reasons were given, well after the fact in 2005, when asked why it was not included in Sonic Gems Collection, Yuji Naka noted that there had been troubles in trying to translate the arcade game's trackball control scheme to standard game controllers, and to date, no ports of the game have ever been released.	Sega	Sega
Shellshock	Originally scheduled for release in 1995 for the 32X and PC platforms, by the time it was delayed and released in mid-1996, a 32X had been cancelled in favor of Sega Saturn and PlayStation 1 releases.	Core Design	U.S. Gold
Sonic Mars	A proposed Sonic the Hedgehog game for the 32X by Sega Technical Institute while Sonic Team was busy developing Nights Into Dreams for the Sega Saturn. Game design documents were created and gameplay prototyped internally, but staff changes and intercompany disagreements delayed progress, and with the 32X lifespan being short, development was shifted to the Saturn, where it became Sonic Xtreme, which was worked on until its cancellation in late 1996.	Sega Technical Institute	Sega
Sonic Sports	Game Players magazine reported that a Sonic Sports game was in development for the 32X. The game would have been similar in concept to ACME All-Stars, including the sports of basketball, soccer, and volleyball. Sonic, Tails, and Ristar were mentioned among the game's playable characters.	Sega	Sega
Soul Star X	Upgraded versions of the 1994 Soul Star release for Sega CD were announced for the 32X, Atari Jaguar CD, and PC platforms, but none ever materialized.	Core Design	Core Design
Spot Goes to Hollywood	An updated version of the 1995 Sega Genesis release was announced for the 32X, Sega Saturn, and the original PlayStation. The 32X version never released, but the Saturn and PS1 versions were criticized for being too similar to the Genesis game on more updated hardware.	Eurocom	Acclaim Entertainment
Street Fighter: The Movie	An altered version of the arcade game of the same name, both of which being game adaptions of the 1994 Street Fighter film, was announced for the 32X, but only ended up releasing on the Sega Saturn and PlayStation 1 in 1995.	Capcom	Capcom
Striker	While developing an iteration of the Striker soccer video games for the Sega Genesis, developers Rage Software discussed plans to develop enhanced versions for other Sega platforms, including a Sega CD version that used the increased storage space of its CD-ROM to store data for over 200,000 different soccer teams, and a 32X version that used its stronger hardware for improved graphics. However, the Genesis version was the only one which ended up releasing on Sega platforms, and future Sega Saturn and Dreamcast version were completely different games.	Rage Software	Sega
Street Racer	A 32X version of the multiplatform racing game was in development, and previewed by French video game magazine Consoles+, but never materialized.	Vivid Image	Ubi Soft
Timmy Time	An original game for the 32X that was described as a platformer shoot em up that involved time travel, the game never released in any capacity.	Domark	Domark
A Town Called Chaos, New Mexico	An adventure game where the player investigates terrible events that keep happening to a small town. The game was one of the Sega-developed games seen as the 32X's "second-wave of software" that was cancelled upon the quick termination of the platform in early 1996.	Sega	Sega
Virtual Golf / Tee-Off	Core Design began work on a golf video game for the 32X and Saturn before even having finalized hardware information for either. The game was announced as Tee-Off in 1994, with the team aiming to release it in time for the 32X launch. The game did not meet launch, and never released on 32X, but later released on Saturn as Virtual Golf.	Core Design	Core Design
Virtua Hamster	Announced in 1995 as a game in development for the 32X, development was briefly shifted to the Saturn before being cancelled outright.	Sega	Sega
VR Troopers	A 32X version of the 1995 Genesis and Game Gear game was in development. While no footage of the game was ever released, it reportedly featured a fully 3D world, something not present in the Genesis or Game Gear versions.	Syrox Developments	Sega
Waterworld	A variety of video game adaptions of the 1995 film of the same name were announced for release around the time of the film. While versions released on SNES, Game Boy, Sega Genesis, and even Virtual Boy, the 32X and Sega Saturn versions were never released.	Data Design Interactive	Ocean Software
Wild Guns	A 32X version of the 1994 SNES release was reportedly scheduled for release in 1995, but never materialized.	Natsume Co., Ltd.	Natsume Co., Ltd.
Wing War	A port of the 1994 arcade game was announced for the 32X, but never released, nor was the game ever released anywhere else beyond its initial arcade release.	Sega	Sega
Wirehead	One of the last Sega CD releases in 1995, a SEGA CD 32X port was announced, but never materialized.		
X-Men / X-Men: Mind Games	An action-adventure game featuring Wolverine, Bishop, Rogue, and Ice Man announced for 32X, and present at E3 1995, but never released in any capacity.		Sega
