= Zaxxon's Motherbase 2000 =

1995 video game

- North American cover art
- Developer: CSK Research Institute
- Publisher: Sega
- Directors: Shinya Izumi; Takeshi Niimura
- Producer: Hiroshi Aso
- Designers: Toshikazu Nagasato; Yuichiro Kuroda
- Programmers: Makoto Nakamura; Masanori Sato; Tooru Kujirai
- Artists: Emi Kurabayashi; Kiyoshi Fujita; Yuzi Yamashita
- Composers: Masami Yitsuse; Naoshi Kunisawa
- Series: Zaxxon
- Platform: 32X
- Release: NA/EU: June 1995; JP: July 14, 1995
- Genre: Scrolling shooter
- Modes: Single-player, multiplayer

Zaxxon's Motherbase 2000, known in Europe as Motherbase and in Japan as Parasquad, is a 1995 isometric-scrolling shooter video game developed by CSK Research Institute and published by Sega for the 32X. The North American version was rebranded as part of the Zaxxon series due to its similar gameplay. Gameplay involves piloting a ship to destroy giant robots and enemy ships, while being able to capture enemy ships and use them as power-ups. Reception to Zaxxon's Motherbase 2000 was negative. While reception of the gameplay was mixed, the visuals were panned as being rough-edged, ugly, and susceptible to slowdown. Most North American critics also said the game is not similar enough to Zaxxon to justify the use of the series name.

== Gameplay ==
Zaxxon's Motherbase 2000 is played from an isometric point of view. Players fight other ships and have the ability to jump into enemy ships and take control of them.

Played from an isometric point of view, similar to the original Zaxxon, the player flies a spaceship through various enemy bases with the goal of destroying enemy robots and craft. Additionally, the player's ship can enter into other craft, using the enemy craft as a power-up, granting the player access to powered up blasters depending on the craft hijacked. The game also features two player head-to-head multiplayer.

According to the game's manual, the story of Zaxxon's Motherbase 2000 involves a Hive Confederation, once a peaceful planetary system until the separation of the Ginglii clan from the Hive. The Ginglii have created a computer which can coordinate the production of weapons and have overtaken and enslaved Hive planets. A rebellion force has begun a mission, codenamed "Motherbase 2000", to get through the Ginglii defenses and reach the computer. The player's ship is called the Stinger.

Several influences on the gameplay have been identified, most prominently Zaxxon, but also elements from Stellar Assault, Space Harrier, Metal Head, Xevious, and Viewpoint.

== Reception ==
Reception

Review scores
Publication	Score
Electronic Gaming Monthly	5.375/10
Famitsu	25/40
HobbyConsolas	75/100
Next Generation	1/5
Video Games (DE)	58%
VideoGames & Computer Entertainment	5/10

Zaxxon's Motherbase 2000 received negative reviews. The four reviewers of Electronic Gaming Monthly especially criticized the removal of the ability to change altitude, which they regarded as one of the Zaxxon series's defining features, and all but one of the reviewers felt that the new jump ability was nearly useless. They approved of the 2D backgrounds but derided the polygon graphics as rough and the controls as sluggish, and generally agreed that the game was not as fun as previous Zaxxon games. GamePro praised the jump ability as the game's only redeeming feature. Though they allowed that some shooter fans would enjoy the game, they felt the gameplay and graphics to be mediocre, and criticized that the game does not resemble the original Zaxxon strongly enough to justify using the Zaxxon name. Spanish magazine Hobby Consolas praised the game's originality but criticized its scrolling mechanic. French magazine CD Consoles criticized the game's graphics and sound, while giving moderate reviews of its creativity and gameplay. Next Generation outright panned the game, arguing that the removal of the ability to change altitude strips Zaxxon of any interest. They also cited slowdown, glitches, and a poorly-designed two-player mode, and concluded: "Zaxxon's MotherBase 2000 is graphically ugly, slow, boring, repetitive, and a game that is truly unworthy of any stars. We'll still give it one star in memory of the much more playable original."

In France, Motherbase topped the Mega Drive 32X ranking published by Mega Force magazine in November 1995, ahead of Knuckles' Chaotix, Virtua Racing Deluxe and Doom.

== See also ==
- Darxide
- Star Wars Arcade
- List of 32X games
