= Garfield: Caught in the Act =

1995 video game

- European Sega Mega Drive box art
- Developers: Sega Interactive Development Division (Note: Ported to Windows by Point of View); Novotrade International (GG)
- Publisher: Sega; Relaunch: NA: Expert Software
- Producers: Michael Latham; Eric Quakenbush (GG)
- Designer: Rhonda Van
- Programmers: Ala D. Diaz; Michael Fernie; Pravin Wagh
- Artists: Art Wong; Michael Chung; Petra Evers
- Writers: James Cabral; Mike Yoffie
- Composers: Dwight Stone; Jeffrey Glenn Tveraas; Tristan des Prés
- Series: Garfield
- Platforms: Genesis, Game Gear, Windows
- Release: November 1995: Genesis; NA: November 1995; EU: December 1995 Game Gear; NA: November 1995; EU: 14 December 1995 Lost Levels; NA: February, 1996 (Sega Channel) Windows Original release; NA: March 1996 Relaunch; NA: September 1997
- Genre: Platform
- Mode: Single-player

Garfield: Caught in the Act (Note: Also known as Garfield in TV Land!) is a 1995 side-scrolling platform game developed and published by Sega for the Genesis and Game Gear; a Microsoft Windows version was also released. It is based upon Jim Davis' comic strip character, Garfield, and draws inspiration from Davis' 1984 book Garfield: His 9 Lives. The story follows Garfield, who is watching television when Odie scares him, causing him to fall onto the television and break it; they both attempt to repair it before Jon catches them. However, some leftover parts become an electronic monster known as the Glitch, who transports Garfield inside the TV, where he must defeat it in order to escape.

Upon release, Garfield: Caught in the Act received mixed reviews from critics, who praised its animation and graphics, but criticized its high difficulty, controls and gameplay.

== Gameplay ==
Genesis screenshot

Garfield: Caught in the Act is a side-scrolling platform game where players take control of the titular cat across levels of varying themes on the television in order to defeat an evil electronic being known as the Glitch and escape the TV.

The levels, though linear in nature, are large and populated with obstacles, enemies and environmental hazards, inviting the player to traverse the stage by running, jumping, climbing, swinging, throwing objects or dodging enemies. Later levels become more maze-like and exploratory, making the player take different routes to reach the end, where a boss must be fought to progress further. There are two types of bonus rounds, one of which resembles a Whac-A-Mole game. Each time the player defeats a boss, Garfield takes a commercial break where he rockets through the Television Wasteland, trying for an extra life or a continue.

Garfield is able to attack enemies up close or throw objects at them (close-range weapons and objects thrown change between each level). Enemies consist of ghosts, piranhas, crabs, bulldogs and mummified mice, among others. All levels also contain beneficial items and weapon ammunition to be collected for Garfield, among other secrets to be found. If Garfield is defeated, he respawns on the nearest checkpoint reached. Once all lives are lost, the game is over, though players have the option of resuming progress from the beginning of the last level reached by using continues or loading a saved game via passwords.

== Plot ==
The general plot summary of Garfield: Caught in the Act is shared between all versions of the game. Odie scares Garfield while he is watching television, and the latter ends up falling onto it, resulting in it breaking to pieces. In a rushed effort to repair the television before Jon catches them, Garfield and Odie attempt to put the broken TV back together, leaving a pile of spare parts. Garfield throws away said parts, which become an electronic monster known as the Glitch. The Glitch transports Garfield into the television and now he must defeat it in order to escape.

== Development ==
I've known [Sega of America president] Tom Kalinske ... for 15 years. We always thought [a Garfield video game] would be a good idea, but neither of us was ready. I didn't have the time to devote to it because of other projects. Two years ago Tom felt the time was right, so we started.

— Garfield creator Jim Davis gave Garfield: Caught in the Act its raison d'être when describing the pillar that formed the project.

Plans for a Garfield game on Sega Genesis came into existence with the rise of licensed platform titles such as Disney's Aladdin by Virgin Games. Development on Garfield: Caught in the Act originally began with programmer Steven Lashower, who worked on the Sega 32X conversion of Star Wars Arcade, but internal development issues led to the project being restarted during Christmas 1994 and months of work being scrapped as a result, with Michael Fernie now serving as lead programmer instead alongside Ala Diaz and Pravin Wagh.

Michael Fernie was a former Absolute Entertainment member who left the company and joined Sega to work on a 32X project titled Ratchet and Bolt but due to Sega Interactive focusing on releasing Eternal Champions: Challenge from the Dark Side, his team and the project made no progress until he was transferred with the Star Wars Arcade staff and was asked to take over Garfield: Caught in the Act, which was facing a turbulent creation cycle. Pravin Wagh was hired by Lashower after Sega purchased the company that later became Sega Interactive, while Petra Evers joined Sega due to her background as concept artist and designer, with the title marking her debut in the video game industry.

Garfield: Caught in the Act on Sega Genesis was developed by most of the same team that worked on Star Wars Arcade for the 32X at Sega Interactive simultaneously with the Game Gear port by Novotrade International, with Michael Latham and Eric Quakenbush serving as producers of each version respectively. Michael Fernie, Pravin Wagh and Petra Evers recounted about the game's development process and history through online interviews. Both Fernie and Wagn claimed that although the project had already been extensively planned via game design documents, many of the original ideas were scrapped due to not being fun such as the train segment in "Catsablanca", which was implemented early but ultimately deemed not satisfactory for the final version.

Other levels in varying degrees of completing were also removed from the original Genesis version such as "Alien Landscape", which was created by Evers and based on a lava lamp, as well as a minigame that involved players picking cheese from a mouse hole. Fernie stated that the marketing team at Sega requested "Count Slobula's Castle" to be the first level of the game, instead of "Cave Cat 3,000,000 BC", with Fernie regarding the former level as one of the weaker stages that likely put off players from seeing the entire game.

=== Art ===
All the sprites and hand-drawn animation in Garfield: Caught in the Act were created by Jim Davis and the artists at Paws, while Sega Interactive transposed the sketches lent by the studio into pixel art graphics, with Fernie stating that the person who did the process was a subcontractor. The game drew inspiration from Davis' 1984 book Garfield: His 9 Lives. Davis noted that the concept for his book allowed them to portray Garfield as more "kinetic" than his usual newspaper strip character, facilitating the book's adaptation into an hour-long TV special, and reasoned that a similar premise would allow a more effective translation of Garfield into the video game medium. Davis also stated he was responsible for creating both the cover art and the introduction sequence.

== Release ==
Garfield: Caught in the Act was first released for the Sega Genesis in 1995 with six levels. This version was also distributed in Brazil by Tectoy. A port for the Sega 32X, called Garfield in TV Land, was planned but ultimately cancelled.

The Game Gear version was developed by Novotrade International and released alongside the Genesis version. It includes two additional levels, one of which appears in The Lost Levels ("Bonehead the Barbarian") and one which is original ("Slobbin Hood"). There is only one type of bonus stage (accessed by finding an icon of Arlene's face in each level), in which the player must wreck everything in Jon's living room within a time limit to get an extra life. Garfield does not have different outfits in each level, and the attacks are the same in all levels (his close-range is a punch, and the projectile are stones). There are no invincibility items. In the between-level segments, Garfield does not take damage from the obstacles; instead, they teleport him back to the start of that segment. Like the Genesis original, the Game Gear version was also distributed in Brazil by Tectoy.

The Microsoft Windows port was developed by Point of View and released by Sega in March 1996. It includes one level from The Lost levels ("Alien Landscape"), while the remaining levels are presented in a different order than on the Genesis original. The PC port was also re-released in the Sonic & Garfield Pack, along with Sonic & Knuckles Collection and Baku Baku Animal. The Windows version is titled Garfield in TV Land! on the box art but Caught in the Act is the ingame title.

=== Garfield: The Lost Levels ===
An exclusive version of the game known as Garfield: The Lost Levels was distributed for the Genesis via the Sega Channel subscription service for three months beginning in February 1996. It features three levels that were originally intended for, but cut from, the main release ("Bonehead the Barbarian", "Alien Landscape", and the train sequence from "Catsablanca"). Due to the Genesis not saving the ROM data of downloaded Sega Channel titles after the console was powered off, Garfield: The Lost Levels became inaccessible to the public after its broadcast was complete. However, in September 2024, the Video Game History Foundation announced that they had acquired a playable build of The Lost Levels. It was publicly shown at the 2024 Portland Retro Gaming Expo, and later released online in December 2025.

== Reception ==
Reception

Review scores
Publication	Score	
Publication	Game Gear	Sega Genesis
AllGame	3/5	3/5
Electronic Gaming Monthly	N/A	8/10, 4/10, 6/10, 6/10
GameFan	N/A	241 / 300
Consoles +	86%	75%
The Electric Playground	N/A	8 / 10
Gambler	2- (B−)	N/A
Gamers	N/A	3- (C-)
Hobby Consolas	79 / 100	77 / 100
MAN!AC	N/A	65%
Mean Machines Sega	81 / 100	67 / 100
Mega Force	81%	N/A
Mega Fun	56%	54%
Player One	82%	N/A
SEGA Magazin	N/A	66%
Sega Power	N/A	70%
Sega Pro	83 / 100	85 / 100
Sega Saturn Magazine	N/A	67%
Video Games	N/A	59%

Award
Publication	Award
Game Players (1995)	Best Game Gear Game of the Year

Critical reception for Garfield: Caught in the Act has been mixed. Reviewing the Genesis version, the four reviewers of Electronic Gaming Monthly praised the graphics and animation, but all but one of them felt these were outweighed by the loose controls and large number of mandatory hits. GamePro similarly commented that "colorful backgrounds and big sprites will charm cartoon lovers", but that Garfield's slow movement and weak moves make the game too frustrating. They concluded, "Fans of the comic strip might enjoy this platform title. The tedious gameplay and hopeless controls will disgruntle anyone else." Sega Saturn Magazine (previously Sega Magazine) criticized the bland backgrounds and sluggish control and summarized that "Once you've overcome the novelty of eliciting any movement from the world's most notorious sleep junkie, you're left with a fairly unoriginal platformer". In a retrospective review of the Genesis version, AllGame editor Brett Alan Weiss praised the "cute cartoon-like" graphics, furthermore stating "Odie, Jon, and the gang all look like themselves, and Garfield is as orange and as fat as ever", but described the game as "an average and unimaginative action game that's cute but not very funny".

Reviewing the Game Gear version, GamePro was pleased with how well the player character recreates Garfield's look and behavior, commenting that, "Garfield's mugs and shrugs are funny and, dare we say it, cute." They concluded that the game, though simplistic and "hardly game of the year", would be a good experience for a younger or beginning gamer.
