= Motocross Championship =

1995 video game

- North American box art
- Developer: Artech Studios
- Publisher: Sega
- Producer: Jesse Taylor
- Platform: 32X
- Release: NA: January 1995; EU: March 1995
- Genre: Racing
- Modes: Single-player, multiplayer

Motocross Championship is a 1995 racing video game developed by Artech Studios and published by Sega for the 32X. The premise of the game is based on motocross racing across twelve different tracks, while being able to attack opponents during the race. Motocross Championship received mixed reviews, with criticism on multiple aspects of the game. Some reviewers have suggested the game's quality impacts the 32X negatively.

== Gameplay ==
The game is based on the sport of motocross. Players race from a perspective behind the biker they control. The biker can punch and kick opponents while passing them. Each race is against 11 other opponents. There are 12 courses in the game, each of which is littered with obstacles. Like motocross, the courses are hilly and riders bounce and slide. Various stunts can also be performed, such as wheelies, leaning over the handlebars, speed slides, and acrobatics. Players are given the option of one of three bikes to drive. Motocross Championship includes a head-to-head multiplayer mode, as well as a single-player Season Mode that comprises 36 races. A password system is used to save progress in Season Mode.

== Reception ==
Reception

Review scores
Publication	Score
Computer and Video Games	59/100
GameFan	79/100; 88/100
M! Games	37%
Mega Fun	57%
Next Generation	3/5
Video Games (DE)	25%
Mean Machines Sega	63/100
Sega Magazine	64/100
Consoles Plus	82%
Micromanía	75/100
Player One	69%

Motocross Championship received mixed reviews, with some commenting on how the release hurt impressions of the 32X as a whole. Next Generation reviewed the game, rating it three stars out of five, and stated that "comparing it to other 32bit games like the 3DO version of Road Rash is like comparing a Schwinn to a Harley Davidson. And Motocross Championship is most definitely the Schwinn." GamePro's Captain Squideo criticized the game's graphics but praised the sound, and called the game "fast fun". Two separate reviewers for GameFan scored the game 79 and 88 out of 100, with each praising the controls. Mean Machines Sega had two reviewers score the game 63 out of 100, with reviewer Gus calling the game's graphics "a hasty piece of work worth avoiding" and reviewer Paul noted the blurry racers and similar-looking tracks. Sega Magazine scored the game 64 out of 100 and also compared the game to Road Rash, with the reviewer calling the game "an embarrassment to the 32X", as well as "slow and unimaginative". A reviewer for Computer and Video Games gave the game 59 out of 100, stating that "the 32X takes another great leap backwards with this release" due to poor coloring, sound, and a lack of playability and game depth.

== See also ==
- List of 32X games
