= Metal Head =

1995 video game

- North American cover art
- Developer: Sega
- Publishers: WW: Sega; BRA: Tectoy
- Director: Masahide Kobayashi
- Producer: Koichi Nagata
- Designer: Ryūtarō Nonaka
- Programmer: Masahiro Wakayama
- Artist: Kōichi Sasaki
- Writer: Ryoichi Hasegawa
- Composers: Atsumu Miyazawa; Jun Senoue; Tatsuya Kōzaki
- Platform: 32X
- Release: JP: 24 February 1995; NA: February 1995; PAL: April 1995
- Genres: Mech simulation First-person shooter
- Mode: Single-player

Metal Head (Note: Japanese: メタルヘッド, Hepburn: Metaru Heddo) is a first-person shooter mech simulation video game developed and published by Sega, and released in 1995 for the Genesis/Mega Drive's 32X add-on, allowing for fully texture-mapped 3D polygons.

== Gameplay ==
Gameplay screenshot.

The game's North American box states "1 or 2 Players", but Sega has confirmed that this was a typographical error and that Metal Head is single player only.

Metal Head's levels are broken down into missions, though most of the missions are to destroy all of the enemies in that particular area using the Mech's various projectile weapons. The time the user have remaining for each mission will count down and is displayed below the power gauge health bar. Before each mission a talking head appears of presumably one of the superior commanders in the Federation Armed Forces/Federation Police, and will instruct the user of the objective of the mission, which includes full voice-acting. A summary of the current mission will also appear when the game is paused.

Designed for Sega's 6-button controller, the game uses a first-person view looking through the windshield of one of the game's 'Metal Head' mechs. The player can switch between multiple camera angles. Below the screen is a control panel displaying the remaining health status, represented by a power-gauge and a percentage number, the time the user has remaining for the mission, the weapon the user is currently accessing and a screen displaying various other information for what is required (i.e. a 'miss' when the user does not hit an enemy target).

In the top-right of the quadrant of the screen is a map of the level. The user's vehicle is represented as a triangle and remaining enemies' vehicles are represented as pulsating circles, which allows navigation throughout each level.

== Story ==
Five years after the 'World Federation' was established strife and war are still on the rise. In order to keep the peace the Federation Armed Forces, part of the Federation Police, build fully armed, bipedal Mechs also known as 'Metal Heads'. The Metal Head's success causes a heavy militarization of the countries of the Federation.

A sudden and chaotic revolution led by terrorists, armed with their own fully armed Mechs, breaks out and the terrorists take control of a whole country. The player character (in a Metal Head) is sent in with his team to liberate the country's capital.

The player character starts in a small border town and works his way in to reach the capital.

== Reception ==
Reception

Review scores
Publication	Score
Computer and Video Games	87/100
Electronic Gaming Monthly	5.5/10, 5/10, 4.5/10, 4/10
Famitsu	7/10, 7/10, 6/10, 6/10
Game Informer	7/10
Game Players	60%
GameFan	90/100, 89/100, 94/100
GamesMaster	78%
Mean Machines Sega	87/100
Next Generation	2/5
Electronic Games	C+
Game Zero Magazine	31.0/50
Games World	80/100
Mega	87%
Sega Magazine	87/100
Sega Power	76%
Sega Pro	80%
Sega Saturn Magazine (JP)	6.25/10
Ultimate Future Games	71%
VideoGames	8/10

According to Famitsu, Metal Head sold 8,103 copies during its lifetime in Japan. The Japanese publication Micom BASIC Magazine ranked the game second in popularity in its June 1995 issue, and it received a 7.2738/10 score in a 1995 readers' poll conducted by the Japanese Sega Saturn Magazine, ranking among 32X and Sega Mega Drive titles at the number 248 spot. It received average reviews.

GameFan's Dave Halverson and Nicholas Dean Des Barres regarded it as an excellent first-generation 32X title and the best game of its kind. Computer and Video Games deemed it as the most impressive-looking 32X title, but felt that it was hindered by weak explosions and slow gameplay. Mean Machines Sega praised the game's detailed polygonal cityscapes, and "called it a "thoughtful shoot 'em up that shows the promise of the 32X". Mega's Rich Lloyd described it as "the thinking man's Doom", but felt that the latter was better in terms of presentation and gameplay.

Game Zero Magazine found the game reasonably fun and compared its visuals favorably to Iron Soldier, but felt that the boring gameplay failed to create the feeling of controlling a mech. GamePro's Manny LaMancha criticized the visual and soundscapes, calling the digitized talking heads "laughable" and complaining of the rasping quality of the audio. LaMancha remarked that the missions are varied but ultimately boil down to the same actions, and summarized the game as "a promising programming experiment not taken to fruition". Electronic Gaming Monthly's four editors panned the game for its boring gameplay, while Next Generation said that its graphics look good in screenshots, but that the game suffers from slow pacing, glitchy explosions, bad controls, pop-up, a poorly designed change-view feature, and clunky combat.
