= Cosmic Carnage =

1994 video game

- North American cover art
- Developer: Almanic Corporation (Note: Additional work by ALU)
- Publisher: WW: Sega
- Programmer: Takashi Shichijo
- Composer: Hikoshi Hashimoto
- Platform: 32X
- Release: NA: December 1994; JP: 27 January 1995; EU: February 1995; BRA: 1995
- Genre: Fighting
- Modes: Single-player, multiplayer

Cosmic Carnage (Note: Also known as Cyber Brawl (Japanese: サイバーブロール, Hepburn: Saibā Burōru) in Japan.) is a 1994 fighting video game developed by Almanic Corporation, in conjunction with ALU, and published by Sega for the 32X add-on. Set in an uncharted star system, the game follows eight fighters from two factions in a struggle for survival. Its gameplay consists of one-on-one fights, with a main six-button configuration, featuring special moves and finisher techniques, as well as two playable modes. The title garnered mixed reception from critics since its release.

== Gameplay ==
Gameplay screenshot.

Cosmic Carnage is a fighting game similar to Mortal Kombat. The player fights against other opponents in one-on-one matches and the fighter who manages to deplete the health bar of the opponent wins the first bout. The first to win two bouts becomes the winner of the match. Each round is timed, which can be adjusted or deactivated in the game options; if both fighters still have health remaining when time expires, the fighter with more health wins the round. The game features five levels of difficulty. Hidden characters can be played via cheat code.

In single-player mode, players can choose from eight playable characters and fight against computer-controlled fighters. Achieving a ‘good ending’ for a fighter is time based; depending on how fast the player kills opponents, the more time there is left to escape to the life pod and get as far away as possible. Like Mortal Kombat, special and death moves are performed by entering button commands while pressing the d-pad. A notable feature is the ability to customize a character prior to matches; Four of the selectable characters use armor to assist them in battle and players may choose between one of two options (‘light’ or ‘heavy’) for each of the three armors (body, leg and arm), each providing characters with their own special move. Similar to the Samurai Shodown franchise, the camera zooms in or out to maximize or minimize the level of graphical detail depending on character movement.

== Synopsis ==
In an uncharted star system, a group of prisoners en route to a celestial space mine overpower the ship's guards and take control of the ship, but during their breakout, most of the ship's controls are damaged. After days of drifting, the criminals realize that their only hope is to hijack another ship and use their distress signal to bring a military ship to their aid. They then trick the ship by ramming their own vehicle into it. The impact, however, badly damages both and destroys all but one of the escape pods, as well as killing all but four from each ship (eight in total). The few survivors fight for the final escape pod and a chance of survival.

=== Characters ===
All soldiers use Light Armor and can be equipped with Heavy Armor before fights, while none of the fugitives use armor.

- Cylic – An alien red ant. In the Japanese version, he is a brown-haired human soldier named Jake. (Note: Jeiku (ジェイク))
- Zena-Lan – A female soldier whose head is constantly on fire. In the Japanese version, she is a blond-haired human soldier named Ray. (Note: Rei (レイ))
- Naruto – A shadow being. In the Japanese version, he is a brown-haired human.
- Tyr (Note: Known in Japan as Carl (カール, Kāru)) – A man with metallic skin wearing samurai like armor.
- Talmac (Note: Known in Japan as Bolt (ボルト, Boruto)) – A tall, dark, sinister figure with a skull-like face, spiked red hair and sharp claws. No one is sure if he wears a mask or not, because no one has gotten close enough to find out.
- Yug (Note: Known in Japan as Wishbone (ウィッシュボーン, U~isshubōn)) – A gorilla-like humanoid who is possibly a robot. He relies almost entirely on his powerful arms for his attacks.
- Naja (Note: Known in Japan as Steer (ステア, Sutea)) – A female snake-shaped siren, with a cobra's head and, instead of legs, a long tail that she uses as a battering ram. Her design and American name are derived from the serpentine nāga of Hinduism and Buddhism, which in sculptures and drawn art were often depicted as having humanoid torsos.
- Deamon (Note: Known in Japan as Finisher (フィニッシャー, Finisshā)) – A vicious alien with large talon-like claws and a scorpion-like stinger attached to the back of his head.

== Development and release ==
Cosmic Carnage was developed by Almanic Corporation in conjunction with ALU. Takashi Shichijo and Hikoshi Hashimoto served as the project's programmer and composer respectively, although neither are credited as such in the credits of the game. According to former Sega staff member Takayuki Kawagoe, the game was initially developed for the Mega Drive, but was converted to the 32X on short notice so that it could have a larger game library. ALU stated on their official website that development kits arrived three months prior to release date during development. The game was first released for the 32X by Sega in North America as a launch title on 21 November 1994. Former Sega of America executive producer Michael Latham stated that the company was rushed to release games on time for the 32X's launch, and said that "[w]hen Cosmic Carnage showed up, we didn't even want to ship it. It took a lot of convincing, you know, to ship that title." The title was then released in Japan on 27 January 1995 under the name Cyber Brawl and later in Europe on February of the same year.

== Reception ==
Reception

Review scores
Publication	Score
Computer and Video Games	65/100
Electronic Gaming Monthly	5/10, 6/10, 4/10, 4/10
Famitsu	6/10, 6/10, 7/10, 6/10
Game Informer	4.5/10
Game Players	61%
GameFan	80/100, 79/100, 89/100
GamesMaster	65%
IGN	3/10
Mean Machines Sega	42/100
Next Generation	1/5
Flux	D+
Games World	78/100
Mega	77%
Mega Play	58%, 45%, 55%, 50%
Sega Magazine	80/100
Sega Power	74%
Sega Pro	62%
VideoGames	7/10

Cosmic Carnage received a 4.6969/10 score in a 1995 readers' poll conducted by the Japanese Sega Saturn Magazine, ranking among 32X and Sega Mega Drive titles at the number 476 spot. The game garnered a mixed reception from critics. In a 1995 interview with Next Generation regarding the response it received, Sega of America president Tom Kalinske said only, "Well, you know, every now and then there are games with which we're not so happy. It's all part of the learning process."

Electronic Gaming Monthly's four editors unanimously commented that even taking into account the fact that it is a launch title, Cosmic Carnage is a disappointing game which fails to push significantly beyond the capabilities of the standalone Sega Genesis in either graphics or audio. They did remark that the armor mechanic is an impressive innovation, but nonetheless felt that the overall gameplay was mediocre at best. In their review, GamePro praised the armor mechanic and sci-fi styled graphics, but criticized the slow action and limited originality, and concluded that "there are more exciting Genesis fighters around". Next Generation considered it "A sad, shambling mockery of a fighting game." Flux's Jeff Kitts wrote that it was "Basically a second-rate fighting game with sluggish action, awful sound and overly detailed graphics that make it hard to determine just what the hell is going on." Although Kitts praised the characters and movesets.

In a retrospective review, IGN's Levi Buchanan applauded the character sprites, noting that they are "large, colorful, and decently detailed", but felt that the sprite detail were "ruined" by zooming effects. Buchanan also criticized the audio, which consists of "[h]orrid, crunchy music and weak sound effects."

== See also ==
- Eternal Champions
