= HyperBlade =

1996 video game

- Developer: Wizbang! Software Productions
- Publisher: Activision
- Platform: Windows 95
- Release: November 1, 1996
- Genre: Action / Sports

HyperBlade is an action video game, depicting a futuristic sport in a futuristic world. The sport is a mutated version of hockey, played in an egg-shaped arena rather than on a flat field or rink, which is loaded with weapons and deadly traps.

It was released by Wizbang! Software Productions in collaboration with Activision on December 16, 1996 for Windows 95, and serious graphics bugs are common in later operating systems. The game was originally announced under the name Hockeydrome, and scheduled to be released for the Sony PlayStation, Sega Saturn, and 32X platforms video game consoles as well, though none of these versions materialized.

== Gameplay ==
Brutality to an extreme is permitted, as advances in medical sciences have prevented once-fatal conditions (such as decapitation) from altering one's life. Each player must avoid the jaks of other players, as well as many arena objects. The players are allowed any enhancement, from steroids to bionic appendages. Each player is in a suit that allows maximum flexibility, strength, and protection, all of which are needed, colored to represent the team they play for. The players have one free gloved right hand, and a bladelike glove called a jak on their left. Players use this blade to pick up mines, swarves, and roks, as well as slash at their opponents (allowed). The primary method of transportation is skating, although jumping is very common to avoid obstacles and players.

HyperBlade is played on a court called a drome, an elliptical dome, each long end with a relatively small goal built into the wall. Many objects litter the drome, each one deadly in its own way. Examples are the turnstile, which one skates through to set spinning, injuring any who travel through it, the laser hurdle, which players must avoid at all costs, and the killball charger, which one skates through while carrying the rok to convert the rok into a killball, a high voltage electrocutor that can be thrown at others. Each team owns an arena, which can have any number of fixed objects in any position in the field..

The winner is the team with the most points (scored by throwing the rok into the goal) at the end of the three-period match. Each period can be 3 minutes, 5 minutes, or 7 minutes, depending on the options the player has enabled before the start of the game. If a team is totally annihilated, they can still win by having scored more points.

The sponsors give out awards to those teams that perform spectacular feats, such as the Supernova if a team racks up 30 points in a game, the Anvil if a team takes another entire team out for the season, and the Archer if all the player's shots on goal are goals.

Each team always has one goalie on the field. They also have two players out of four cycling in and out of the field at all times. When a player is killed or injured (the goalie is invulnerable to any attack except for mines), the player's spot cannot be filled until a goal is scored, or the period ends, and the body of the player is completely removed from the Drome. When a player is decapitated, his head is immediately magnetized and used as the rok, as the original rok (or, sometimes, previous head) vanishes.

The players vary greatly, some are light and fast, others are tough, slow and enforcer like, they also differ in other attributes, such as "rok handling".

== Multiplayer ==
Multiplayer was available via "network play", allowing up to four players to play at one time with up to 45 different playable characters to choose from.

== Development ==
The game was developed by WizBang! Software Productions, a company founded in 1994.

Nearly all of the polygons which form the players and environments are flat shaded, an unusual design choice given that most games of that time applied texture mapping. Lewis Peterson of Activision said of this that "Part of it was an aesthetic decision. More importantly, a texture-mapped polygon costs about 10 times the processor budget of a flat-shaded polygon, so we had to make a decision as to whether or not we wanted one big texture-mapped polygon, or a more detailed and fine-tuned characters. [sic]" Support for texture mapping using Direct3D graphics accelerators was added to HyperBlade after Peterson made this statement.

HyperBlade was one of the first PC games that supported the new Microsoft DirectX APIs and supported full 3D texture map support for PCs with the 3D graphics accelerators as well as flat shaded polygons for PCs without a graphics accelerator. Many graphics hardware manufacturers bundled HyperBlade in the box of their 3D graphics accelerators so consumers would have a title which supported Direct3D out of the box.

== Reception ==
Reception

Review scores
Publication	Score
Computer Games Magazine	3/5
PC Gamer	78%

Computer Games Magazine said "After a few games it grows tiresome, due to its lack of challenge and bothersome gameplay quirks. However, it has so much potential it makes you long for next year's model"

The game sold over a million copies.
