= SegaSonic the Hedgehog =

1993 arcade game

- Developer: Sega AM3
- Publisher: Sega
- Director: Tomosuke Tsuda
- Composers: Hiroshi Kawaguchi; Keitaro Hanada; Naoki Tokiwa
- Series: Sonic the Hedgehog
- Platform: Arcade
- Release: JP: 1993 (Note: Reported release date varies; sources either state it was released in June 1993 or in October 1993)
- Genre: Platform
- Modes: Single-player, multiplayer
- Arcade system: Sega System 32

SegaSonic the Hedgehog (Note: Japanese: セガソニック・ザ・ヘッジホッグ, Hepburn: SegaSonikku za Hejjihoggu) is a 1993 arcade game in the Sonic the Hedgehog series by Sega. Controlling Sonic the Hedgehog and his friends Mighty the Armadillo and Ray the Flying Squirrel, the player must escape an island after they are kidnapped by the villain, Doctor Eggman. The game uses an isometric perspective. Players use a trackball to move the characters while dodging obstacles and collecting rings. The game was developed by Sega's arcade division, Sega AM3. It is one of four Sonic games with the SegaSonic name and was inspired by the 1984 game Marble Madness.

SegaSonic the Hedgehog was released in Japanese arcades in late 1993. It has never been rereleased; a port for Sega's 32X never materialized, and the game was cut from the compilation Sonic Gems Collection (2005) due to problems with replicating the trackball control system on a standard controller. At the time of release, SegaSonic the Hedgehog received positive reviews from Electronic Gaming Monthly and Computer and Video Games for its graphics and gameplay. Retrospective reviews have been more divided. The game marked the debuts of Sonic characters Mighty and Ray; both have reappeared sparingly in the franchise.

== Gameplay ==
From left: Sonic, Mighty, and Ray skate across an ice-themed level.

SegaSonic the Hedgehog is a platform game that has been likened in gameplay to Marble Madness (1984). Players control three characters: Sonic the Hedgehog, Mighty the Armadillo, and Ray the Flying Squirrel, who can be controlled by a single player or simultaneously with two others. The story follows the three characters after series antagonist Doctor Eggman traps them on his island. They team up to escape, and must dodge various hazards and dangers to reach Eggman in his base, the Eggman Tower.

The game takes place over seven levels, which must be completed in the fastest time possible. Players use a trackball to control a characters' speed and direction from an isometric perspective, and a button to make a character jump into a Spin Attack. Each character has a health bar, which is depleted when the player falls into traps; players lose a life if the bar empties. Health can be recovered by collecting rings that are littered around the course or hidden inside obstacles or enemies. Players receive bonus rings for use in later levels they collect over a certain percentage of rings within a level. Upon reaching Eggman at the end of the game, he pushes a button that causes the island to self-destruct. The three heroes manage to escape unharmed, while Eggman is left stranded at sea.

== Development and release ==
Before SegaSonic the Hedgehog, Sega had attempted to create two Sonic the Hedgehog-based arcade games, but these were never released because "they were not the specialness that Sonic was." By May 1993, a new Sonic arcade project was in development. SegaSonic the Hedgehog was developed by Sega AM3, an internal Sega division that created games for arcade cabinets, with assistance from Sonic Team. The game is one of four arcade games in the Sonic the Hedgehog series to feature the SegaSonic name. (Note: The other titles are SegaSonic Popcorn Shop, SegaSonic Cosmo Fighter, and the canceled SegaSonic Bros.)

According to designer Manabu Kusunoki, the idea for trackball controls was conceived after an unspecified member of the development team—who was a fan of Marble Madness—suggested that it would work well with Sonic's style of gameplay. The game uses a Sega System 32 motherboard, which enables the multiplayer option, and a unique isometric graphics system. It features two new characters, Ray the Flying Squirrel and Mighty the Armadillo. Both were designed by Kusunoki, who chose their species since he thought they would control similarly to how Sonic did and that they, like hedgehogs, were obscure. Mighty was likely based on an early prototype of Sonic. The game also features voice acting, with Takeshi Kusao, Hinako Kanamaru, Yūsuke Numata, and Masaharu Satō voicing Sonic, Ray, Mighty, and Eggman, respectively.

The game's title in development was simply Sonic the Hedgehog, but was changed to SegaSonic because Sega lost the trademark to the Sonic name during production. Kusunoki could not recall why it was disputed; however, according to video game journalist John Szczepaniak, Sega of America failed to turn in its paperwork for the trademark on July 13, 1993. SegaSonic the Hedgehog was featured at the Summer International Consumer Electronics Show 1993 and the Amusement Machine Show 1993. It was released in Japanese arcades later that year. It is unclear if the game was released outside Japan. Hackers discovered English-translated dialogue and sprites based on Eggman's appearance in the American Sonic the Hedgehog animated series hidden within the ROM image, suggesting that there were plans to release it in American arcades to promote the series.

SegaSonic the Hedgehog has never been rereleased. A port for the 32X, an add-on for the Sega Genesis, was reported to be in development in late 1994. Sonic co-creator Yuji Naka said the game was considered for inclusion in the 2005 rarities compilation Sonic Gems Collection for the GameCube and PlayStation 2, but was excluded due to difficulties with emulating the trackball controls on a gamepad. In 2011, Sega's brand manager Ken Balough said there is not much demand for a rerelease, because it was not released outside Japan. In 2020, Sega's Yosuke Okunari mentioned the possibility of SegaSonic The Hedgehog being ported if games in the Sega Ages line were successful.

== Reception and legacy ==
Game Machine listed SegaSonic the Hedgehog in November 1993 as being the sixth most popular table arcade unit in Japan at the time. Electronic Gaming Monthly gave SegaSonic the Hedgehog a perfect score of 10 out of 10. The magazine stated that the game "shatters your perception of what a good game should be", reserving high praise for its graphics and music, and the variety of levels. It also praised the "hilarious" character animations and cinematics, and encouraged readers to play the game. Computer and Video Games offered similar acclaim and praised the game's attention to detail, "highly recommend[ing]" it. The French magazine Mega Force compared the isometric graphics to Sega's Zaxxon (1981) and SNK's Viewpoint (1992). Gamest enjoyed the game but wrote that its trackball controls will hurt the player's palm.

In the midst of a review for Sonic Gems Collection in 2005, GameSpy expressed disappointment that SegaSonic the Hedgehog was not one of the games in the compilation, voicing hope it would someday be rereleased. In 2014, GamesRadar+ called the game's graphics impressive for 1993, but that its lack of a rerelease was "no great loss". John Szczepaniak offered a negative stance in 2018, due to what he called bland level design and imprecise controls that had "an irritating fuzziness". He compared turning characters with the trackball to feeling intoxicated, and claimed to have watched several individuals try to play but give up. Hardcore Gaming 101's Kurt Kalata similarly criticized the controls and high difficulty level, but nonetheless praised its break-neck pace and level design, which he wrote were aspects the Genesis Sonic games could not achieve. He ultimately summarized the game as "a fun experiment".

Mighty appeared as a playable character in the 32X game Knuckles' Chaotix (1995). For many years, Ray did not appear in another game, but he and Mighty were featured in the Sonic the Hedgehog comic book series published by Archie Comics. Ray became a member of the Chaotix along with Mighty, who is depicted in the series as his honorary brother. The game is referenced in the anniversary game Sonic Generations (2011), where a "missing persons" poster of Ray and Mighty appears in City Escape. Mighty and Ray are playable in Sonic Mania Plus (2018), an expanded version of the 2017 game Sonic Mania.
