= Fahrenheit (1995 video game) =

- Developer: Sega
- Publisher: Sega
- Composer: Domenic Troiano
- Platforms: Sega CD, Sega 32X CD
- Release: 1995
- Genre: Adventure game
- Mode: Single-player

Fahrenheit is a full motion video game developed and published by Sega for release on the Sega CD and Sega 32X CD in 1995.

Developed primarily as a 32X CD title, it also saw a release on the Sega CD, where it was the same game, but with downgraded video quality. Both versions were bundled and sold together as one package for the North American release, while Japan and Europe only saw the Sega CD version released.

== Gameplay ==
Fahrenheit is one of the many full-motion-video games that were released for the Sega CD in the 1990s. Played through a first-person perspective it follows a rookie firefighter belonging to a fictional fire house called "Company 13".

After an introduction exposition scene the player advances to the first of three burning buildings (i.e. a house, an apartment, and a college service basement) to rescue victims and property while disposing of potential hazards (explosives, kerosene, gas valves, etc.).

As the player wanders through each building, an on-screen menu will pop up, allowing movement to the left, right or forward. The game is timed, so decisions must be made quickly or the computer will make the (wrong) decisions for the player. In addition to this, the player has a limited supply of oxygen.

The game has three different levels of difficulty and a password feature.

== Reception ==
On release, GamePro called the game "a well-executed thriller that slowly builds in intensity." Though they complained that players are given too much time to think about their choices, they praised the game's cinematic presentation, tough decision making, and use of aural clues. Famicom Tsūshin scored the Mega-CD version of the game a 24 out of 40.

GamePro later did a separate review for the 32X version, commenting that "The strong elements of Fahrenheit on the Sega CD get even better on the 32X CD." Next Generation scored the 32X version two out of five stars, commenting, "Fahrenheit is unusual in that it lets you decide where to go, something that has never been done in an FMV game before. That feature alone almost makes this game fun. However, the typically bad acting, grainy video, and lack of gameplay don't allow the fun to happen."
