= Knuckles' Chaotix =

1995 video game

- North American box art
- Developer: Sega
- Publisher: Sega
- Directors: Masahide Kobayashi; Atsuhiko Nakamura; Naohisa Nakazawa
- Producers: Hiroshi Aso; Makoto Oshitani; Mike Larsen
- Artist: Takumi Miyake
- Composers: Junko Shiratsu; Mariko Nanba
- Series: Sonic the Hedgehog
- Platform: 32X
- Release: JP: April 21, 1995; NA: May 1995; EU: June 23, 1995
- Genre: Platform
- Modes: Single-player, multiplayer

Knuckles' Chaotix (Note: The game is titled on the title screen and in Japan as Chaotix (Japanese: カオティクス, Hepburn: Kaotikusu).) is a 1995 platform game developed and published by Sega for the 32X. A spin-off of the Sonic the Hedgehog series, it features Knuckles the Echidna and four other characters known as the Chaotix, who must prevent Doctor Robotnik and Metal Sonic from obtaining six magic rings and conquering a mysterious island. The gameplay is similar to previous Sonic games: players complete levels while collecting rings and defeating enemies. Knuckles' Chaotix introduces a partner system whereby the player is connected to another character via a tether; the tether behaves like a rubber band and must be used to maneuver the characters.

While Sonic Team is sometimes credited with creating Knuckles' Chaotix, it was developed by another Sega team. Production began with Sonic Crackers, a 1994 prototype for the Sega Genesis which experimented with the tethering system and featured Sonic and Tails. Knuckles' Chaotix was planned as a Sonic game for the Sega Saturn, but transitioned to the 32X when it could not be completed in time. Sonic and Tails were replaced by Knuckles and a group of mostly pre-existing characters; Mighty the Armadillo first appeared in the arcade game SegaSonic the Hedgehog (1993).

Knuckles' Chaotix was released in Japan on April 21, 1995, and then in North America and Europe in May and June 1995 respectively. It received mixed contemporary reviews and failed commercially. Reviewers found the tethering physics cumbersome, although some appreciated it as an attempt to innovate. The level design and low difficulty level were also criticized. Journalists have described Knuckles' Chaotix as the last of the "classic" 2D Sonic games before the series moved to 3D. Some characters and concepts it introduced feature in later Sonic games and media, beginning with Sonic Heroes in 2003. Despite interest from fans, it has not been rereleased beyond a brief period through GameTap in the mid-2000s.

== Gameplay ==
The player (left) builds tension in the tether while anchoring the partner (right) to perform a speed boost.

Knuckles' Chaotix is a side-scrolling platform game similar to earlier entries in the Sonic series. Unlike other Sonic games, players are tethered to a computer or human-controlled partner; the tether behaves like a rubber band and must be properly handled to maneuver through stages. There are five playable characters, each with their own unique abilities. Knuckles the Echidna can glide and climb walls; Mighty the Armadillo can perform a wall jump; Espio the Chameleon can run along walls and ceilings; Vector the Crocodile can boost through the air and climb walls; and Charmy Bee can fly and hover. There are two other partner characters, Heavy the Robot and Bomb, who hinder players' progress due to their slow or destructive nature, respectively. The story takes place on a mysterious island and follows the group's efforts to stop Doctor Robotnik and Metal Sonic from harnessing the power of the island's mythical Chaos Rings to satisfy their evil deeds.

The game takes place over six levels called attractions. Each attraction is divided into five acts; the fifth ends in a boss fight with Robotnik and one of his large robots. Each act has a different time of day decor, such as morning, noon, evening, and night. Like earlier Sonic games, players collect rings, jump to perform a spin attack to defeat enemies, and can perform a spin dash on the ground to gain speed. Power-ups include rings, shields, and speed shoes. The partner system enables players to perform actions not seen in earlier Sonic games. Players can call their partner if they are separated, which reunites them with the main character but costs 10 rings, or throw their partner to reach far platforms. If the partner is computer-controlled, the player can stop and anchor the partner to perform special moves such as "snapping" to a higher ledge or thrusting to gain speed.

Before entering a stage, the player begins in a hub world where they choose a partner and level. Bonus stages are hidden throughout attractions, and can be triggered by obtaining 20 or more rings and finding one of the giant golden rings hidden away in each level. In the bonus levels, the player is free-falling and picks up power-ups. Special stages are reached by finishing a level with 50 or more rings. In these stages, the player collects blue spheres in a forward-scrolling platformer to earn a Chaos Ring. Collecting all Chaos Rings unlocks the "good" ending, in which Sonic and Tails are seen with the Chaotix, who have freed the island from Robotnik.

== Development ==
Although Sonic Team is sometimes credited for developing Knuckles' Chaotix, it was developed by another internal Sega team, including staff who had worked on Sonic CD (1993). Development began around April 1994 for the Sega Genesis as an engine test, with the working title Sonic Crackers. (Note: Sonic Crackers is sometimes referred to as Sonic Stadium because of the ROM header containing the title Sonic Studium [sic].) The prototype featured Sonic and Tails joined by an elastic band of energy; the name likely comes from clackers, a toy comprising two balls connected by string. According to the journalist Ken Horowitz, Sonic Crackers was most likely a ROM made to demonstrate new concepts to management. Some ideas were used in Sonic 3D Blast (1996), while the level design, tethering, and some music resurfaced in Knuckles' Chaotix.

Sega eventually moved development to the Genesis' more powerful 32X add-on. According to Horowitz, this was because the 16-bit era of consoles was coming to an end. Former Sega of America CEO Tom Kalinske recalled that Knuckles' Chaotix was once intended for the Genesis' successor, the Sega Saturn, as a mainline Sonic game. According to Kalinske, development moved to the 32X when it became clear that the game would not be ready for the Saturn launch; Kalinske said it was "too big, it was taking too long, it was over budgeted, it was behind schedule". Because Sega needed new 32X games, Sega decided to downsize the game and introduce it quickly on 32X.

By December 1994, Sonic and Tails had been removed and the game had been reworked to star Knuckles the Echidna, who had been introduced in Sonic the Hedgehog 3 (1994). The project had the working title Knuckles' Ringstar. The game also adds the characters Mighty the Armadillo, Vector the Crocodile, Espio the Chameleon, and Charmy Bee. Mighty had appeared in the arcade game SegaSonic the Hedgehog (1993); many of Sonic's animations from Crackers were repurposed for Mighty. Vector the Crocodile was created for the original Sonic the Hedgehog (1991) but scrapped before release, and Charmy Bee originally appeared in the Sonic the Hedgehog manga. Sonic co-creator Naoto Ohshima said he was responsible for repurposing Vector and Charmy, but otherwise had no involvement with Knuckles' Chaotix.

Espio was the only original character, designed by manga artist Takumi Miyake. A leaked prototype lists Espio as the featured character on the title screen instead of Knuckles, suggesting he once featured more prominently, possibly in a starring role. The 32X's processing power allowed for dynamic sprite-scaling effects, and 3D polygons in the special stages. A complex palette system allowed each level to load unique colors. The music was composed by Junko Shiratsu and Mariko Nanba.

== Release ==
Knuckles' Chaotix was released in Japan on April 21, 1995, in North America on May 1995, and in Europe on June 23, 1995. According to Horowitz, the game was rushed to help boost sluggish 32X sales. It quickly faded into obscurity, and is now considered a valuable collector's item due to the 32X's commercial failure. The only rerelease came in 2005, when Knuckles' Chaotix was briefly made available for Mac OS X and Windows computers via the subscription service GameTap.

The Sonic Crackers prototype ROM was leaked online by a Belgian hacking group in June 1995 and can be played with emulators. A cartridge version was auctioned for $146.50 in 2001. While some fans speculated that the Sonic Crackers ROM was an April Fools' Day hoax, its authenticity has been corroborated by multiple sources, including references in an internal Sega design document and text found in a later Knuckles' Chaotix prototype.

== Reception ==
Reception

Review scores
Publication	Score
1Up.com	B
AllGame	2/5
Electronic Gaming Monthly	7.5/10, 7/10, 7.5/10, 7.5/10
Famitsu	6/10, 6/10, 7/10, 6/10
Game Players	41%
GameFan	98/100
GamePro	2/5
IGN	6/10
Mean Machines Sega	84/100
Next Generation	2/5

Knuckles' Chaotix received mixed reviews, and failed commercially, as did the 32X.

The game's presentation divided critics. The four reviewers of Electronic Gaming Monthly (EGM) praised its graphics and believed the game was one of the best for the 32X, and GameFan considered Knuckles' Chaotix the best entry in the franchise since Sonic the Hedgehog 2 (1992). On the other hand, a reviewer from Next Generation found the graphics garish, and felt that the game made "unimpressive attempts to show off". GamePro, Game Players, and IGN believed the game failed to push the 32X to its limits, citing the lack of graphical effects and Genesis-quality audio, though IGN felt some elements, such as several musical tracks, were highlights. In 2008, GamesRadar wrote that Knuckles' Chaotix was the best game for the 32X and was underrated, though it still considered the game a "wasted opportunity".

The "rubber band" multiplayer system was criticized, despite being acknowledged as an effort to innovate. Though IGN admired the attempt to "breathe life into a series that was running out of steam" and fix the lopsided multiplayer of Sonic 2 and Sonic 3 (1994), whereby Tails would get lost off-screen, they felt the physics were "clunky" and unorthodox. EGM felt the system was original, but slowed down the gameplay, as did GamesRadar. Next Generation felt the bond was tiring and not truly innovative, and GamePro called it Knuckles' Chaotix's biggest flaw, finding it frustrating and choppy. The reviewer also found that the bond complicated gameplay and compared it to being handcuffed.

The level design and low difficulty were also criticized. GamePro wrote that the levels, while fairly large, were not populated with enough enemies or secrets, a sentiment echoed by IGN and Mean Machines Sega. IGN considered the boss design simplistic and the level design bland and seemingly unfinished, and Mean Machines Sega thought that, without enemies, "this is just not half the game it could have been". Game Players criticized the game's lack of replay value, saying the game's simplicity made secrets in levels impossible to miss. However, IGN, GameFan, and EGM praised the number of playable characters, and IGN felt the game's "marvelous" fully 3D special stages were the best of the Sonic series.

IGN described Knuckles' Chaotix as "a bad game with a good foundation", and in another article, concluded that it was interesting, if flawed. EGM felt it was the best for the 32X but failed to live up to previous games in the Sonic series. Game Players found it a major disappointment, saying "other than a few color-enhanced backgrounds, you're gonna wonder why this isn't a Genesis title". Some journalists have referred to Knuckles' Chaotix as the series's declining point, and AllGame and Complex Networks both wrote that it was among the worst games in the series.

== Legacy ==
Knuckles' Chaotix is considered the last of the "classic" Sonic games before the 3D game Sonic Adventure (1998) took the series in new gameplay directions. Several of its concepts were re-used in later Sonic games. A similar partner system features in the Game Boy Advance game Sonic Advance 3 (2004), and IGN noted similarities between the game's auto-running special stages and Sonic and the Secret Rings (2007). Two tracks from Knuckles' Chaotix, "Tube Panic" and "Door Into Summer", appear in Sonic Generations (2011). The "Hyper Ring" power-up re-appeared in Sonic Mania (2017) and a recreation of Knuckles' Chaotix's final boss fight was added in a 2018 update.

With the exception of Mighty, all Chaotix members have become recurring characters in the Sonic series. (Note: Games featuring the Chaotix include Sonic Heroes (2003), Shadow the Hedgehog (2005), Sonic Rivals 2 (2007), the Nintendo DS version of Sonic Colors (2010), Sonic Generations, and Sonic Forces (2017); Espio is a playable character in the arcade game Sonic the Fighters (1996) and Vector is playable in Mario & Sonic at the Olympic Games (2007) and its sequels.) The characters initially did not reappear until Sonic Heroes in 2003. Director Takashi Iizuka said that Sonic Team revived the Chaotix because the studio thought they were unique and had never used them. Iizuka considers the Heroes version of the characters different from the 32X one, claiming to have created new characters simply using the same designs. The group had storylines in the Sonic the Hedgehog comic series produced by Archie Comics and Sonic the Comic by Fleetway Publications, as well as in the anime series Sonic X. As part of the Sonic franchise's 35th anniversary in 2026, an audio drama about the Chaotix entitled Sonic the Hedgehog Presents: The Chaotix Casefiles was released on streaming services. The series spanned eight episodes from January 27th to March 17th, and has accumulated over two million downloads.

While Game Informer considered the Chaotix to be among the best characters of the franchise and are underutilized, GamesRadar considered the introduction of the Chaotix a negative turning point for the series as it "diluted the Sonic-verse by introducing tons of shitty characters". James Stephanie Sterling felt that all the Chaotix lacked redeeming qualities, calling Vector "Idiot the Crocodile" and Espio "Generic Brooder the Chameleon". They singled out Charmy for particular ridicule, feeling he was annoying and noting his high-pitched voice. Mighty would eventually return as a playable character in Sonic Mania Plus in 2018.

In 2011, Sega noted fans frequently requested Knuckles' Chaotix as a game desired to be rereleased. 1UP.com and GameSpy expressed disappointment the 2005 compilation Sonic Gems Collection did not include the game. In 2010, Sonic Team head Iizuka expressed interest in developing a sequel. Also expressing interest was Christian Whitehead, the developer of the mobile versions of Sonic CD, Sonic the Hedgehog, and Sonic the Hedgehog 2, saying in 2014 that he would be open to remaking Knuckles' Chaotix using the Retro Engine.
