= Zero Tolerance (video game) =

1994 video game

- Brazilian cover art
- Developer: Technopop
- Publisher: Accolade
- Director: Scott Haile
- Producer: Randel B. Reiss
- Designers: Thomas Gjoerup; Tony Ramos
- Programmers: Thomas Gjoerup; Justin Wolf
- Artists: Sheryl Knowles; Gary Jones
- Composer: Dezso Molnar
- Platform: Genesis
- Release: EU: September 1994; NA: October 5, 1994
- Genre: First-person shooter
- Modes: Single-player, multiplayer

Zero Tolerance is a first-person shooter video game developed by Technopop and published in 1994 by Accolade for the Sega Genesis. It was one of the few first-person shooters for the console, along with Bloodshot, Duke Nukem 3D, and Corporation.

== Plot ==
The game takes place in a future where mankind has made great advances in interstellar travel and subsequently colonized the Solar System. There are extrasolar settlements, research outposts, mines, commercial colonies, and spacecraft and space stations throughout the Solar System protected by an interstellar military conglomerate named the Planet Defense Corps.

When Europa-1, the flagship of the Planet Defense Corps, is attacked by an unknown yet lethal aggressor of extraterrestrial nature, the Planet Defense Corps call in Zero Tolerance, an elite strike squad containing five specialty-trained commandos. A recording of Europa-1's last transmission shows that there was a lot of fire damage to the warship, that almost everyone on board died, and that strange creatures were looking for the few people who managed to escape the attack. Additionally, the nuclear cooling system of Europa-1 has been damaged by a small arms fire, and a core breach caused by overheating will destroy the starship in a matter of hours.

During the crisis briefing, the player character is told to sneak into Europa-1 before it blows up as a member of the Zero Tolerance squad. Their mission is to eliminate the mysterious alien aggressor from within and the transformed humans of Europa-1 that have been "infected" in the next few hours to erase all evidence of the attack and the alien intruders.

== Gameplay ==
Zero Tolerance's first stage

Zero Tolerance has 40 levels spread out over three different areas: the space warship Europa-1, an abandoned merchant freighter, the Planet Defense Corps' heavily fortified central command building, and the sub-basement areas of that building. The objective of the game is to kill all of the enemies on a level and then proceed to the exit, which is either a staircase or elevator leading down to the next level.

However, nothing prevents the player from heading straight toward the exit without killing all of the enemies. If this is done, the player is simply not given any passwords until the entire area is finished.

When a character is killed, he or she is marked as "deceased" and is no longer playable. The player can choose from a total of five different characters; once they are all deceased, the game is over.

For multiplayer mode, the game supported connecting two systems using a special link cable and the second joypad port. The cable was originally supposed to be shipped as a pack-in with the game. However, this was changed in a last-minute decision, and a coupon for ordering a free cable was added instead.

== Reception ==
Reception

Review score
Publication	Score
Electronic Gaming Monthly	9/10, 7/10, 6/10, 8/10 (GEN)

GamePro gave the game a mostly positive review, commenting that "first-person games like Zero Tolerance put pressure on a system's processor, but Accolade has done a good job here: The anxiety caused by an adversary careening around a corner or the twitching body of a gunned-down spider is severe." They additionally praised the large and labyrinthine levels, cooperative multiplayer ability, and limited but effective sound effects, though they criticized a few elements, such as how slowly the player character turns. The four reviewers of Electronic Gaming Monthly had varying reactions to Zero Tolerance but generally agreed that it was an effective substitute for Wolfenstein 3D and Doom on the Genesis. Game Informer rated it eight out of ten. Power Unlimited gave the game a score of 70 out of 100 praising the 2-player mode and commented that "Apart from the flamethrower, it offers nothing new."

== Legacy ==
A sequel, called Beyond Zero Tolerance (or Zero Tolerance 2)⁣ was in development by Technopop for the Genesis, but its production was cancelled. A letter-writing campaign for Accolade to release the game was started and did not succeed. The ROMs of the game and its sequel were offered by the owner for free download later. In Beyond Zero Tolerance, the player character has to go to the alien motherland and kill every living thing there.

In October 2005, Eidos Interactive announced a game titled Zero Tolerance: City Under Fire for PlayStation 2 and Xbox. Technopop's former president and owner of its assets, Randel B. Reiss, made a statement in which he held the trademark for the title Zero Tolerance, and also announced that he was working on an updated version of the classic Zero Tolerance under the same title which was developed for the PlayStation Portable; the statement alleged trademark infringement on Reiss' trademark and sent a cease and desist notice to Eidos Interactive in using the title Zero Tolerance. Eidos later renamed their game Urban Chaos: Riot Response.

On April 21, 2022, Piko Interactive and Strictly Limited Games announced the Zero Tolerance Collection being developed by Qubyte Interactive. The Zero Tolerance Collection contains the original game, now called Zero Tolerance Origins, a new nine-level expansion called Zero Tolerance Underground, with maps originally meant for a canceled Sega CD version and the prototype for Beyond Zero Tolerance. It was released for Xbox One, Xbox Series X/S, PlayStation 4, PlayStation 5 and Nintendo Switch, alongside Microsoft Windows via Steam and GOG.com. Zero Tolerance Origins was also re-released for the Genesis as a limited physical run. Zero Tolerance Collection was released on July 7, 2022. In 2024, it was included on a release for the Evercade.

== See also ==
- List of commercial games released as freeware
