= Shadow Squadron =

1995 video game

- North American box art
- Developer: Sega (Note: Mechanical design work by Artmic)
- Publisher: Sega
- Directors: Katsunori Yamaji; Youichi Shimosato
- Producers: Mamoru Shigeta; Hiroshi Aso
- Designer: Koji Tsuchida
- Programmers: Shigeru Yoshida; Toshiyuki Kuwabara
- Artists: Kimitoshi Yamane; Tomohiro Maki
- Writer: Ryoichi Hasegawa
- Composers: Masaru Setsumaru; Teruhiko Nakagawa
- Platform: 32X
- Release: JP: 26 April 1995; NA/EU: June 1995
- Genre: Space combat simulation
- Modes: Single-player, multiplayer

Shadow Squadron (Note: Also known as Stellar Assault (Japanese: ステラアサルト, Hepburn: Sutera Asaruto) in Japan and Europe.) is a 1995 space combat simulation video game developed and published by Sega for the 32X. Players assume the role of a recently promoted flight officer from the titular squadron taking control of one of the two Feather space fighter crafts in an attempt to defend Outpost 51 by overthrowing the invading alien fleet coming from outer space bounds across multiple sectors and destroying their Sun-powered laser cannon. Conceived by Koji Tsuchida, Shadow Squadron was created in conjunction with Japanese animation design studio Artmic, who provided mecha designs by Kimitoshi Yamane.

Shadow Squadron has been met with a mostly mixed reception from critics since its release, some of which praised various aspects such as the 3D flat-shaded polygon visuals, gameplay and controls but others criticized its lackluster presentation and sound design, while most reviewers felt divided in regards to other areas like the lack of additional texture-mapped graphics and replay value. Critics also compared the game with other games in the same genre such as Star Fox, Star Raiders, and Star Wars Arcade, which received a conversion for the 32X months prior. A sequel, Stellar Assault SS, was created by SIMS Co., Ltd. and released exclusively for the Saturn in Japan on 26 February 1998.

== Gameplay ==

Top: Feather 1 gameplay.
Bottom: Feather 2 gameplay.

Shadow Squadron is a semi-open 3D space combat simulation game similar to Star Fox and Star Wars Arcade where players assume the role of a recently promoted flight officer from the titular squadron taking control of either one of the two Feather space fighter crafts through six missions set across various sectors in outer space, where the main objective is to obliterate the invading alien fleet and their Sun-powered laser cannon in order to protect Outpost 51. Besides a single-player campaign, the game also offers a two-player cooperative mode where one player pilots the ship, while either the AI or other human players act as the gunner. In addition, players also have access to the options menu at the title screen where various settings can be adjusted such as controls, difficulty level, sound configurations, among other settings that alters the gameplay as well as an object viewer option that allows to get a closer look at enemies.

The player can control the tilt of the ship and fly in any direction. There is a target locking system that helps the player find enemies quickly, as well as shows which enemies are closer by a number at the target's side. Besides lasers, both ships also have their own type of torpedo. An energy shield, capable of protecting the ship against enemy fire and hits, can be turned on and off when needed to save energy. A circular radar display appears at the bottom of the screen, which also tilts as the ship does. A next target arrow shows the player which direction the nearest enemy is. Each of the two available fighter crafts have their own advantages and disadvantages; Feather 1 is a highly maneuverable and fast light ship equipped with automatic laser cannons, whereas the Feather 2 is a more powerful and heavier ship that relies on manual fire. If the player chooses the second fighter they will have the option of choosing auto-pilot, which allows the computer to fly and the player to concentrate on fighting.

The enemy ships are built with polygons and there are two main type of enemies, fighters and carrier ships. Both types must be destroyed before the current mission is complete on some levels; on others only the carrier ships must be eliminated. Before starting each mission, a tactical display shows the player's ship and all targets that must be eliminated. If the ship is destroyed, players have the choice to keep playing with a limited number of continues but once all of them are used, the game is over. After dying or completing the game, a "Trace" option is unlocked at the title screen, acting as an entire instant replay of the previous playthrough.

== Development and release ==
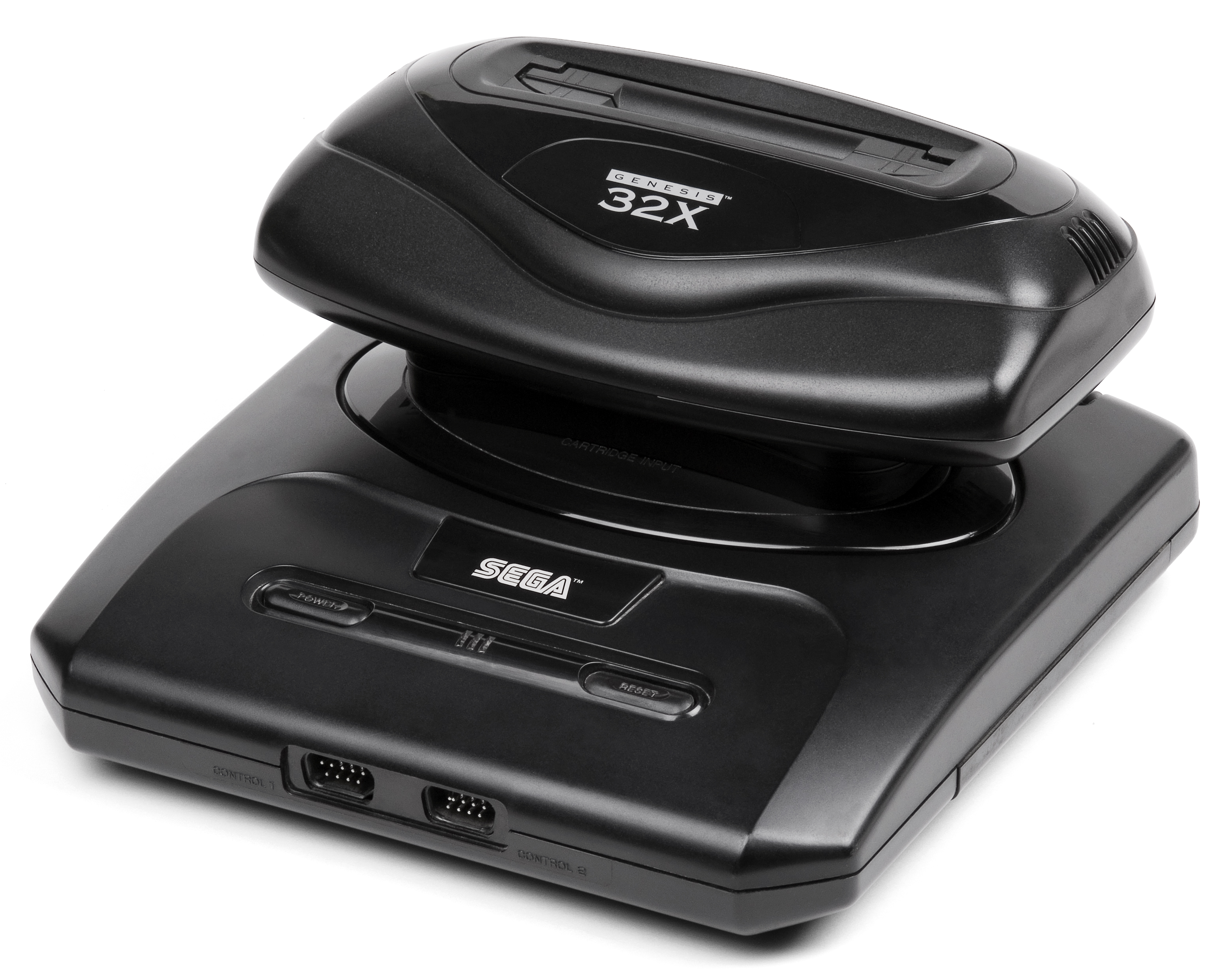
Shadow Squadron for the 32X was a collaboration effort between Sega and Artmic.

Shadow Squadron was developed by Sega in conjunction with Artmic, who assisted in the mechanical design work, becoming their only involvement with video games. Its creation was helmed by designer and director Koji Tsuchida, who was previously involved with projects such as the X68000 conversion of Fantasy Zone and Star Wars: Attack on the Death Star, alongside producers Hiroshi Aso and Mamoru Shigeta. Shigeru Yoshida and Toshiyuki Kuwabara served as its programmers while composers Masaru Setsumaru and Tatsuya Kozaki led the sound department with Teruhiko Nakagawa, who did the sound effects. Japanese mecha designer Kimitoshi Yamane provided the mechanical designs that would later be modeled in-game by artist Tomohiro Maki, among other people collaborating in its development.

Shadow Squadron was first released in Japan on 26 April 1995 under the title Stellar Assault, then in North America on 25 May of the same year, and later in Europe on June during the same time period under its original Japanese name. Some critics have noted similarities between the game and the science fiction metaseries Gall Force after release due to its mecha designs. Early previews before launch in video game magazines showcased a different HUD compared to the final version.

== Reception ==
Reception

Review scores
Publication	Score
Computer and Video Games	81/100
Electronic Gaming Monthly	5.5/10, 5/10, 5/10, 5/10
Famitsu	6/10, 6/10, 7/10, 7/10
Game Informer	8.25/10
Game Players	71%
GameFan	89/100, 75/100, 90/100
IGN	8/10
Mean Machines Sega	80/100
Next Generation	3/5
Fusion	B−
Games World	79%
Sega Power	87%
Sega Pro	82%
Sega Saturn Magazine (JP)	7.25/10
VideoGames	9/10

The Japanese publication Micom BASIC Magazine ranked Shadow Squadron seventh in popularity in its August 1995 issue, and it received a 8.5/10 score in a 1995 readers' poll conducted by the Japanese Sega Saturn Magazine, ranking among 32X and Sega Mega Drive titles at the number 42 spot. The game received generally favorable reviews from critics.

The four reviewers of Electronic Gaming Monthly gave Shadow Squadron a unanimous score of 5 out of 10, assessing it as no more than a thinly veiled upgrade of Star Wars Arcade with primitive graphics and dull gameplay. They argued that the free-roaming movement and multiplayer mode, while fun additions, do not make a fundamental difference to the gameplay. GamePro also regarded the game as a Star Wars Arcade upgrade, but give it a more mixed review. They criticized the music but praised the graphics and controls as a considerable improvement over Star Wars Arcade. Next Generation commented that the game has poor presentation, citing sound effects similar to those found on 8-bit consoles and an overly monochrome color scheme, but good gameplay and controls, particularly the ability to fly in any direction. They gave it three out of five stars.

John Linneman of Eurogamer gave praise to the game's 3D visuals.

== Legacy ==
A sequel to Shadow Squadron, titled Stellar Assault SS, was developed by SIMS Co., Ltd. and only released in Japan for the Sega Saturn on 26 February 1998. An English fan translation was released in 2023.
