= Game design document =

Living software design document

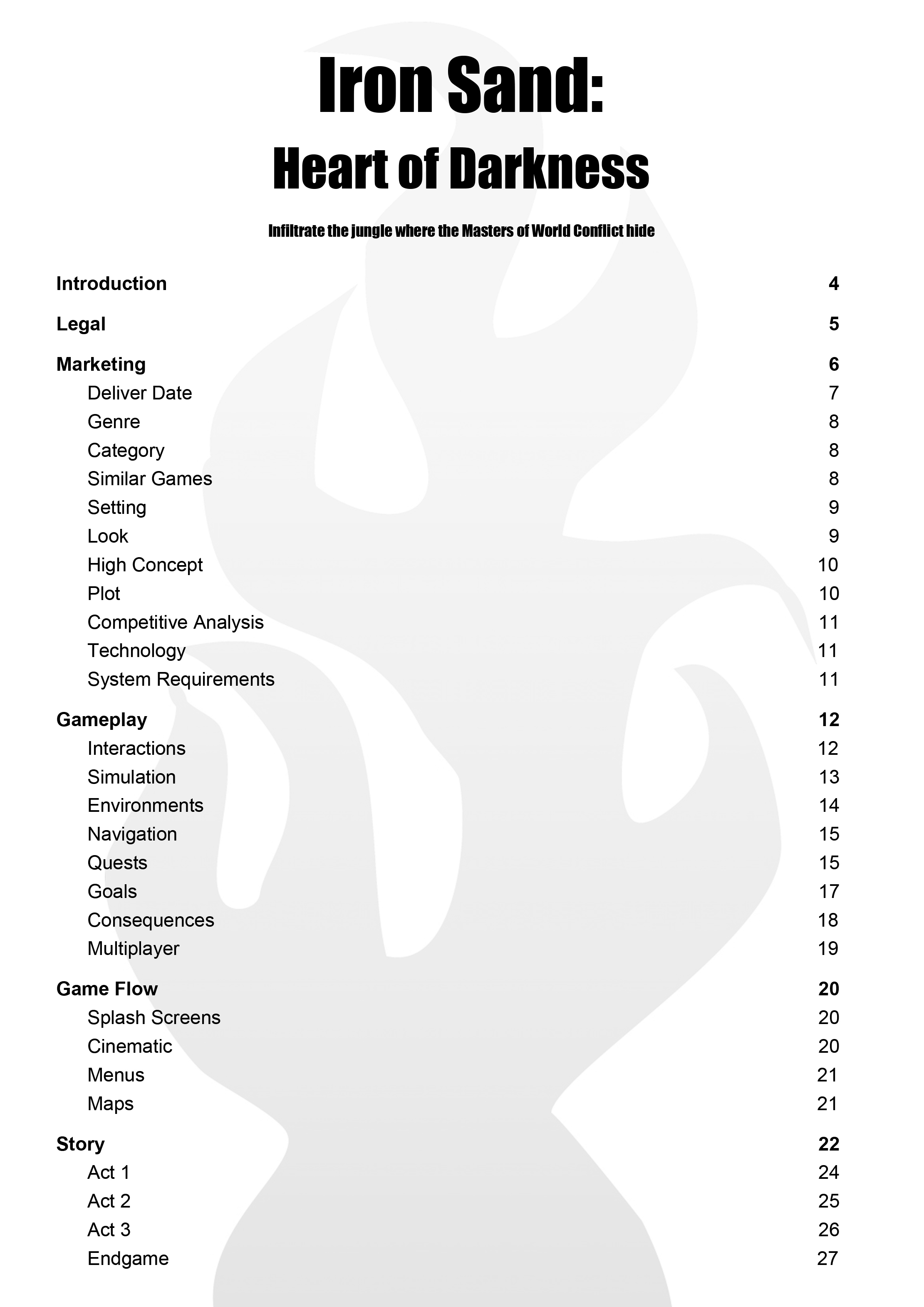
An example table of contents of a GDD

A game design document (GDD) is a highly descriptive living software design document of the design for a video game. A GDD is created and edited by the development team or a lead figurehead and is primarily used in the video game industry to organize efforts within a development team. The document is created by the development team as result of collaboration between their designers, artists and programmers as a guiding vision which is used throughout the game development process. When a game is commissioned by a game publisher to the development team, the document must be created by the development team and it is often attached to the agreement between publisher and developer; the developer has to adhere to the GDD during game development process.

== Life cycle ==
Game developers may produce the game design document in the pre-production stage of game development—prior to or after a pitch. Before a pitch, the document may be conceptual and incomplete. Once the project has been approved, the document is expanded by the developer to a level where it can successfully guide the development team. Because of the dynamic environment of game development, the document is often changed, revised and expanded as development progresses and changes in scope and direction are explored. As such, a game design document is often referred to as a living document, that is, a piece of work which is continuously improved upon throughout the implementation of the project, sometimes as often as daily. A document may start off with only the basic concept outlines and become a complete, detailed list of every game aspect by the end of the project.

== Content ==
A game design document may be made of text, images, diagrams, concept art, or any applicable media to better illustrate design decisions. Some design documents may include functional prototypes or a chosen game engine for some sections of the game.

Although considered a requirement by many companies, a GDD has no set industry standard form. For example, developers may choose to keep the document as a word processor document, or as an online collaboration tool.

== Structure ==
The purpose of a game design document is to unambiguously describe the game's selling points, target audience, gameplay, art, level design, story, characters, UI, assets, etc. in enough detail for the respective developers to implement. The document is purposely sectioned and divided in a way that game developers can refer to and maintain the relevant parts.

A game design document may cover some or all of the following topics:

- Story
- Monetization
- Characters
- Level/environment design
- Gameplay
- Art
- Sound and Music
- User Interface, Game Controls
- Accessibility
- Target Audience
- Development Timeline

Some topics might not appear in the GDD itself but may instead appear in supplemental documents.

== Game concept ==
The game concept describes the main idea of the game. This section of the document is a simple explanation of the ideas for the game. The concept includes what the game exactly is, and what is being made of it. This portion of the document will also inform such people like the art team, publishers, developers, etc., on the expectations of the game when it is being developed. So while in the production phase of the game, the document is being used as a guide to create the game. The concepts are introduced to a product development director, or even an executive producer, before it is allowed outside of the product development department. It will then be the director's decision to whether the idea has merit or not, leading to the idea being disregarded or supported to develop the game proposal.

Even with the concept being in favor of the director, there is still the possibility of changes being requested. The director might pass the concept to others as part of the design staff, producers, or shown to the entire department or company, giving the concept a higher chance at being more captivating with the addition of a buoyant and imaginative group of people.

The Game Concept portion of the document may contain the following:

- Introduction
- Background (optional)
- Description
- Key features
- Genre
- Platform(s)
- Concept art (optional)
