= Star Wars Arcade =

1994 video game

Star Wars
- North American 32X cover art
- Developer: Sega AM3 R&D (Note: 32X version developed by Sega InterActive.)
- Publishers: Sega; LucasArts
- Composers: Hiroshi Kawaguchi; Kazuhiko Nagai; Youichi Ueda
- Series: Star Wars
- Platforms: Arcade, 32X
- Release: Arcade: JP: April 27,1994; NA: 1994; EU: April 1994; 32X: NA: November 21, 1994; JP: December 3, 1994; PAL: January 1995
- Genres: Action, space simulation
- Modes: Single-player, multiplayer
- Arcade system: Sega Model 1

Star Wars is a 1994 action space simulation arcade game developed and published by Sega. The game is based on the original Star Wars trilogy. Combining elements of A New Hope and Return of the Jedi, the game has players pilot a Rebel starship and battle against the forces of the Empire. Sega developed Star Wars for their Model 1 system, the same arcade hardware that powered Virtua Fighter and Virtua Racing. Like those two titles, the graphics in Star Wars are rendered entirely using polygons. The game was given a home port under the name Star Wars Arcade, as an exclusive for the 32X's launch in 1994.

Sega followed up the release of Star Wars with Star Wars Trilogy Arcade and Star Wars: Racer Arcade, as well as a Star Wars pinball game.

== Gameplay ==
The gameplay is similar to that of Atari's 1983 Star Wars arcade game. Players pilot an X-wing or a Y-wing in first- or third-person perspective and battle Imperial forces.

The game has three levels which include intercepting TIE fighters in an asteroid field, destroying a Super Star Destroyer and making an assault run on a Death Star. The arcade cabinet allows two people to play, with one serving as pilot and the other as gunner.

== Reception ==
Reception

Review scores
Publication	Score
AllGame	32X: 2.5/5
Computer and Video Games	ARC: 80%
Edge	32X: 6/10
Electronic Gaming Monthly	32X: 6.25/10
Next Generation	32X: 3/5
Flux	32X: B

Award
Publication	Award
VideoGames	Best 32X Game

In Japan, Game Machine listed Star Wars Arcade as the sixth most successful upright/cockpit arcade unit of June 1994.

Electronic Gaming Monthly described it as a decent but disappointing launch game for the 32X. They praised the excellent graphics but complained about repetitive gameplay and limited movement. GamePro similarly assessed that the game is a decent demonstration of the 32X's graphical capabilities but suffers from repetitive gameplay. They also criticized that the controls are convoluted when using a standard three-button gamepad, and that in cooperative mode the second player's cursor is difficult to see against certain backgrounds. Next Generation called the 32X version: "An excellent translation of a good game, and a good hint of what to expect from 32X." Flux magazine reviewed the 32X version and praised the graphics, the digitized sound bytes although they criticized the "tough" controls. They recommended the game for Star Wars fans.
