= Sega Saturn Magazine =

British video game magazine

- June 1998 issue
- Editor: Samantha Robinson, Richard Leadbetter
- Categories: Video games
- Frequency: Monthly
- First issue: January 1994 (as Sega Magazine)
- Final issue Number: November 1998; 59
- Company: EMAP
- Country: United Kingdom
- Based in: London
- Language: English
- ISSN: 1360-9424

Sega Saturn Magazine (originally known as Sega Magazine) was a monthly magazine from the United Kingdom covering the Sega Saturn, a home video game console. It held the official Saturn magazine license for the UK, and some issues included a demo CD created by Sega, Sega Flash, which included playable games and game footage. In 1997, the magazine reported a readership of 30,140. The last issue, 37, was published in November 1998.

== History ==
Sega Magazine was first published in 1994 and covered the Sega consoles available at the time, including the Master System, Mega Drive, Mega-CD, 32X and Game Gear. In November 1995, it was relaunched as Sega Saturn Magazine and coverage of other Sega consoles was gradually reduced.

In addition to reviews, previews, and demo discs, the magazine included interviews with developers about topics such as the development libraries that Sega was providing them with, and would routinely cover topics of interest only to hardcore gamers such as imported Japanese RPGs and beat 'em ups. The magazine retained its title even after its content became chiefly devoted to the Saturn's successor, the Dreamcast, as the Saturn had been discontinued in Europe.
