= 32X =

Video game console add-on

Sega 32X

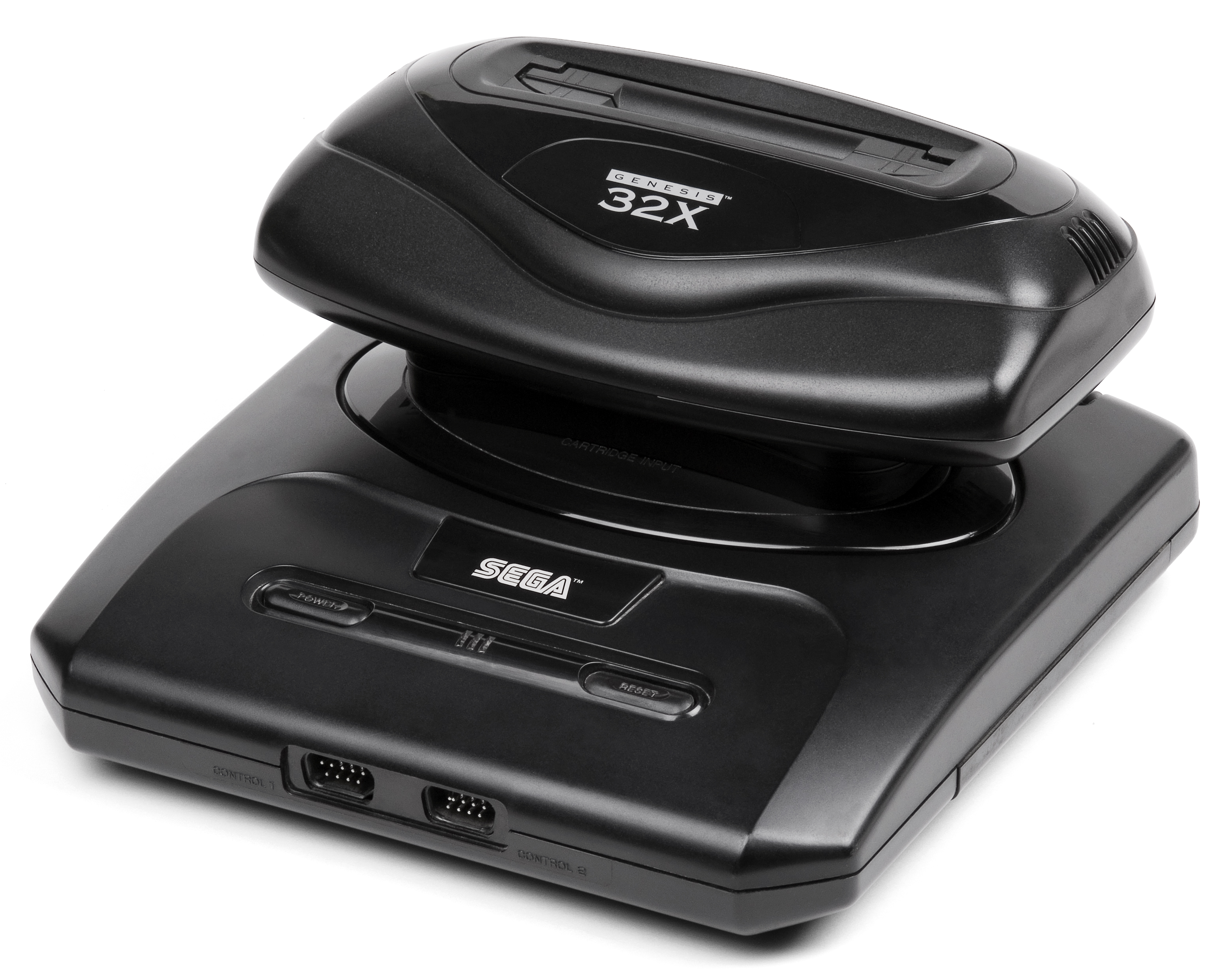
- The 32X attached to a second model Genesis
- Developer: Sega
- Manufacturer: Sega
- Type: Video game console add-on
- Generation: Fifth
- Released: November 21, 1994: NA: November 21, 1994; EU: November 1994; JP: December 3, 1994; BR: March 1995
- Introductory price: ¥16,800 (equivalent to ¥18,991 in 2024); US$159.99 (equivalent to $348 in 2025) £169.99 (equivalent to £359 in 2025)
- Discontinued: 1996
- Units sold: 665,000
- Media: ROM cartridge, CD-ROM (with Sega CD)
- CPU: 2× SH-2 32-bit RISC @ 23 MHz
- Memory: 256 KB RAM, 256 KB VRAM
- Display: 320 × 240 resolution, 32,768 on-screen colors
- Dimensions: 110 × 210 × 100 mm (4.3 × 8.3 × 3.9 in)
- Weight: 495 g (17.5 oz)
- Backward compatibility: Sega Genesis cartridges
- Related: Sega CD

The 32X is an add-on for the Sega Genesis video game console. Codenamed "Project Mars", it was designed to expand the power of the Genesis and serve as a transitional console into the 32-bit era until the release of the Sega Saturn. The 32X uses its own ROM cartridges and has its own library of games. It was distributed under the name Super 32X (Note: Japanese: スーパー32X(エックス), Hepburn: Sūpā Sanjūni Ekkusu) in Japan and South Korea, Genesis 32X in North America, Mega 32X in Brazil, and Mega Drive 32X in all other regions.

Sega unveiled the 32X at the Consumer Electronics Show in June 1994, and presented it as a low-cost option for 32-bit games. It was developed in response to the Atari Jaguar and concerns that the Saturn would not make it to market by the end of 1994. Though the 32X was conceived as a new, standalone console, at the suggestion of Sega of America executive Joe Miller and his team, it became an add-on for the Genesis that made the console more powerful. The final design contained two 32-bit central processing units and a visual display processor.

The 32X failed to attract third-party developers and consumers because of the announcement of the Saturn's simultaneous release in Japan. Sega's efforts to rush the 32X to market cut into time for game development, resulting in a weak library of 40 games that did not fully use the hardware, including Genesis ports. Sega produced 800,000 32X units and sold an estimated 665,000 by the end of 1994, selling the rest at steep discounts until it was discontinued in 1996 as Sega turned its focus to the Saturn.

The 32X is considered a commercial failure. Initial reception was positive, highlighting the low price and power expansion to the Genesis. Later reviews, both contemporary and retrospective, were mostly negative because of its limited game library, poor market timing and its market fragmentation of the Genesis.

== History ==
The Sega Genesis was released in 1988. During its lifespan, Sega had heavily marketed it as a 16-bit console that was technologically superior to its competitors. However by early 1994, it was facing competition from newer, more powerful 32-bit consoles, such as the Atari Jaguar and the 3DO. The Sega CD, a previous add-on for the Genesis released in 1991, had failed to meet commercial expectations or meaningfully extend the Genesis' lifespan, and the Sega Saturn, its planned successor, would not be fully rolled out worldwide until late 1995. This left a nearly two-year gap that Sega worried would allow its competitors to gain traction. According to then-Sega of America CEO Tom Kalinske, "Initially, the argument was that we could get another year of life out of the Genesis before we had to introduce the Saturn. Japan disagreed with me on that, so as kind of a stopgap measure, the 32X came up."

=== Development ===
During the Winter Consumer Electronics Show in January 1994, Sega of America research and development head Joe Miller took a phone call in his Las Vegas hotel suite from Sega president Hayao Nakayama, in which Nakayama stressed the importance of coming up with a quick response to the Atari Jaguar. Included on this call were Sega of America producer Scot Bayless, Sega hardware team head Hideki Sato, and Sega of America vice president of technology Marty Franz. One idea mooted by the Japanese team, referred to by former Sega of America producer Michael Latham as "Genesis 2", was an entirely new independent console. This would have been a new Genesis model with an upgraded color palette and some limited 3D capabilities thanks to integration of ideas from the development of the Sega Virtua Processor chip.

According to Latham, Miller dismissed an upgraded Genesis as "just a horrible idea. If all you're going to do is enhance the system, you should make it an add-on. If it's a new system with legitimate new software, great. But if the only thing it does is double the colors...." Miller said his idea was to leverage the existing Genesis as a way to keep from alienating Sega customers, who would otherwise be required to discard their Genesis systems entirely to play 32-bit games, and to control the cost of the new system in the form of an add-on. From these discussions, the new add-on, codenamed "Project Mars", was advanced.

With Miller pushing for his American team to create the system, the 32X was designed as a peripheral for the existing Genesis, expanding its power with two 32-bit SuperH-2 processors, the same as those that would be used in the Saturn but with a lower clock speed. The SH-2 had been developed in 1993 as a joint venture between Sega and Japanese electronics company Hitachi. The original design for the 32X add-on, according to Bayless, was created on a cocktail napkin, but Miller denied this. In another account, Bayless claimed that Franz began designing the 32X on a hotel notepad, drawing two SH-2 processors with separate framebuffers.

Although the new unit was a stronger console than originally proposed, it was not compatible with Saturn games. This was justified by Sega's statement that both platforms would run at the same time, and that the 32X would be aimed at players who could not afford the more expensive Saturn. Bayless praised the potential of this system at this point, calling it "a coder's dream for the day" with its twin processors and 3D capabilities. Sega of America headed up the development of the 32X, with some assistance from Sato's team in Japan. Shortages of processors due to the same 32-bit chips being used in both the 32X and the Saturn hindered the development of the 32X, as did the language barrier between the teams in Japan and the United States.

Before the 32X was launched, the release date of the Saturn was announced for November 1994 in Japan, coinciding with the 32X's target launch date in North America. Sega of America was tasked with marketing the 32X with the Saturn's Japan release occurring simultaneously. Their answer was to describe the 32X as a "transitional device" between the Genesis and the Saturn; Bayless said this "just made us look greedy and dumb to consumers".

=== Promotion and release ===
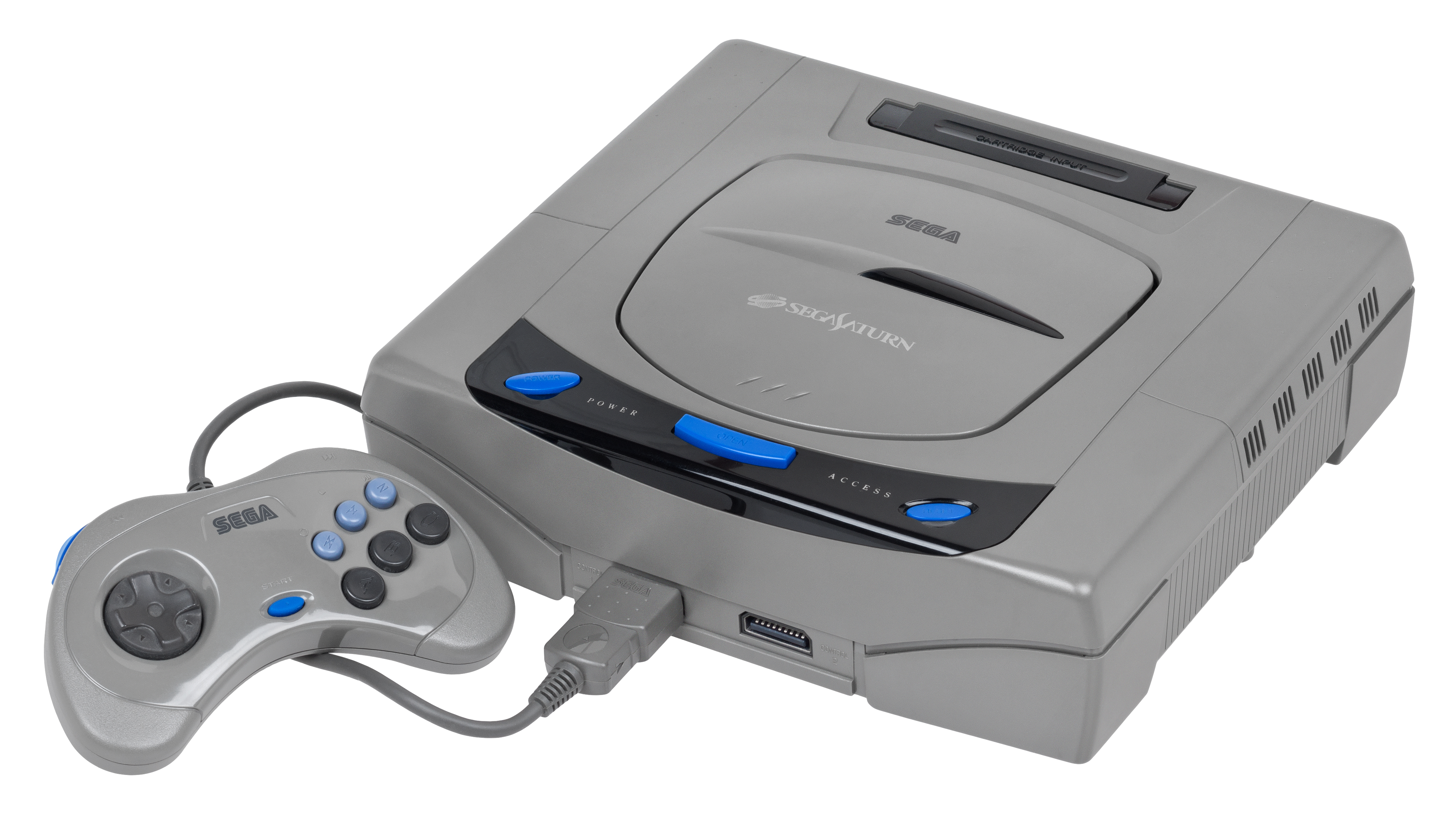
Japanese Sega Saturn, released in November 1994. The 32X was incompatible with Saturn software.

The 32X was unveiled to the public at the Summer Consumer Electronics Show in June 1994 in Chicago. Promoted as the "poor man's entry into 'next generation' games", 32X was marketed for its US$159 price point as a less-expensive alternative to the Saturn. However, Sega would not answer whether a Genesis console equipped with a Sega CD and a 32X would be able to run Saturn software. Trip Hawkins, founder of The 3DO Company, was willing to point out that it would not, stating, "Everyone knows that 32X is a Band-Aid. It's not a 'next generation system.' It's fairly expensive. It's not particularly high-performance. It's hard to program for, and it's not compatible with the Saturn." In response to these comments, Sega executive Richard Brudvik-Lindner pointed out that the 32X would play Genesis games, and had the same system architecture as the Saturn.

In August of that year, GamePro highlighted the advantages of the upcoming add-on in its 32-bit processors and significantly lower price, noting that "[n]o doubt gotta-get-it-now gamers will spend the big bucks to grab Saturn or PlayStation systems and games from Japan. For the rest of us, however, 32X may well be the system of choice in '94." Edge was more critical, questioning if the 32X was only there to fill in as a stopgap for the Christmas season in the US and Europe, and referred to the Japanese release as a "PR exercise and quick money maker [rather] than a serious bid to get the machine into every home". Responding to concerns over the 32X being a stopgap, Kalinske said, "Saturn will be at a price point that will not make it a massmarket item. In terms of volume and keeping the category exciting, it's Genesis and 32X."

The 32X was released on November 21, 1994, in North America, in time for the holiday season that year. As announced, it retailed for $159.99 without a pack-in game. Demand among retailers was high, and Sega could not keep up with orders for the new system. Over 1,000,000 orders had been placed for 32X units, but Sega had only managed to ship 600,000 units by January 1995. In the United States, nearly 500,000 units were sold by Christmas 1994, exceeding Sega's initial sales projection. Launching at about the same price as a Genesis console, the price of the 32X was less than half of what the Saturn's price would be at launch. The European release came in November 1994, at a price of £169.99, and also experienced initial high demand.

Sega promised 12 games available at launch and 50 games due for release in 1995 from third-party developers. Despite Sega's initial promises, only six games were available at its North American launch, including Doom, Star Wars Arcade, Virtua Racing Deluxe, and Cosmic Carnage. Although Virtua Racing was considered strong, Cosmic Carnage "looked and played so poorly that reporters made jokes about it". Games were available at a retail price of $69.95. Advertising for the system included images of the 32X being connected to a Genesis console to create an "arcade system". Japan received the 32X on December 3, 1994, two weeks after the launch of the Saturn in the region. The 32X launched in Brazil in March 1995.

=== Decline ===
Despite the lower price console's positioning as an inexpensive entry into 32-bit gaming, Sega had a difficult time convincing third-party developers to create games for the new system. Top developers were already aware of the coming arrival of the Sega Saturn, Nintendo 64, and PlayStation, and did not believe the 32X would be capable of competing with any of those systems. Not wanting to create games for an add-on that was "a technological dead-end", many developers decided not to make games for the system. Problems plagued games developed in-house due to the 32X's quick development time. According to Bayless, "games in the queue were effectively jammed into a box as fast as possible, which meant massive cutting of corners in every conceivable way. Even from the outset, designs of those games were deliberately conservative because of the time crunch. By the time they shipped they were even more conservative; they did nothing to show off what the hardware was capable of." Kalinske has said that Sega of America did not receive enough support from Japan in game development. Development kits came out late, leaving little time for game development before the 32X release. According to one developer, the 32X's hardware was significantly slower than the Saturn and lacked the capability for texture mapping.

Journalists were similarly concerned about Sega's tactic of selling two similar consoles at different prices and attempting to support both, likening Sega's approach to that of General Motors and segmenting the market for its consoles. In order to convince the press that the 32X was a worthwhile console, Sega flew in journalists from all around the country to San Francisco for a party at a local nightclub. The event featured a speech from Kalinske, live music with a local rapper, and 32X games on exhibition. However, the event turned out to be a bust, as journalists attempted to leave the party due to its loud music and unimpressive games on display, only to find that the buses that brought them to the nightclub had just left and would not return until the scheduled end of the party.

Though the system had a successful launch, demand soon disappeared. Over the first three months of 1995, several of the 32X's third party publishers, including Capcom and Konami, cancelled their 32X projects so that they could focus on producing games for the Saturn and PlayStation. The 32X failed to catch on with the public, and is considered a commercial failure. By 1995, the Genesis had still not proven successful in Japan, where it was known as Mega Drive, and the Saturn was beating the PlayStation, so Sega CEO Hayao Nakayama decided to force Sega of America to focus on the Saturn and cut support for Genesis products, executing a surprise early launch of the Saturn in the early summer of 1995. Sega was supporting five different consoles before this—Saturn, Genesis, Game Gear, Pico, and the Master System—as well as the Sega CD and 32X add-ons. Sales estimates for the 32X stood at 665,000 units at the end of 1994. Despite assurances from Sega that many games would be developed for the system, in early 1996, Sega finally conceded that it had promised too much out of the add-on and decided to discontinue the 32X in order to focus on the Saturn. In September 1995, the retail price for the 32X dropped to $99, and later the remaining inventory was cleared out of stores at $19.95, with 800,000 units sold in total.

=== Sega Neptune ===
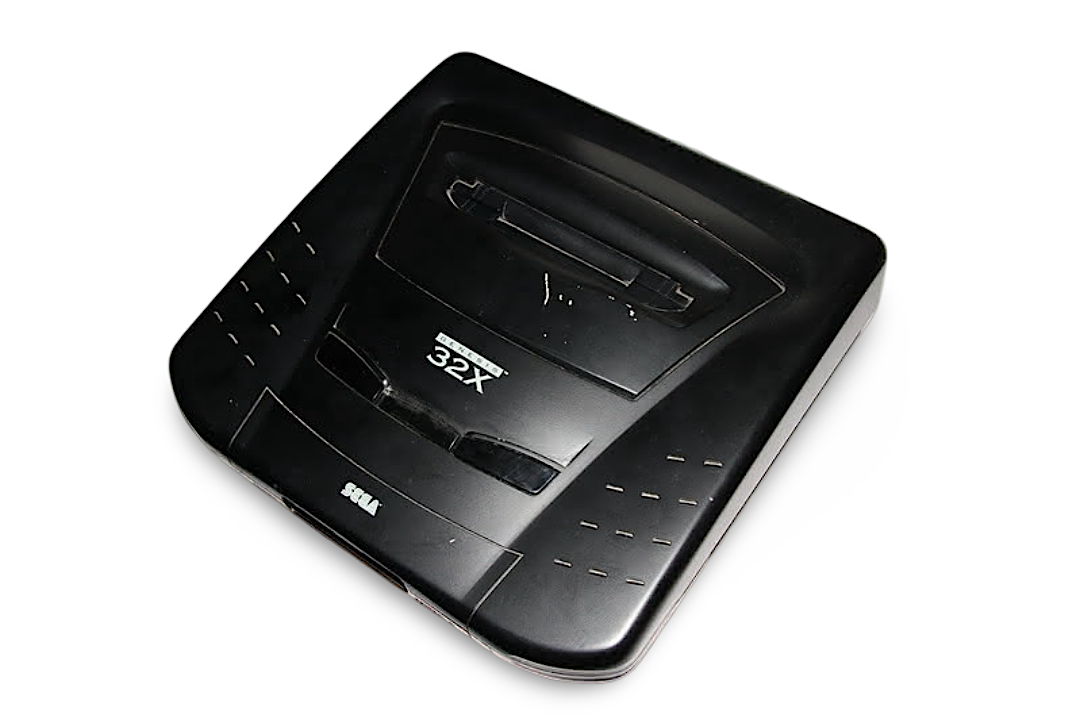
A non-functional representation of the Sega Neptune, illustrating Sega’s planned 'Genesis 32X System' design.

The Sega Neptune is an unproduced two-in-one Genesis and 32X console that Sega planned to release in winter 1996, with the retail price planned to be under $200. In Sega’s 1995 official product catalog, the system was presented under the name "Genesis 32X System", reflecting Sega’s intention to market it as a fully integrated Genesis and 32X platform.

The console was featured as early as March 1995, with Sega Magazine stating that the unit "shows [Sega's] commitment to the hardware". The same official catalog listed the system as compatible with the Sega-CD, which logically follows from its design as an integrated platform, meaning that both standard CD titles and CD 32X titles would have operated on the Neptune as well.

Sega cancelled the Neptune in October 1995, expressing concern that releasing another hardware platform would dilute their marketing focus on the Saturn and place a sub-$200 hybrid system uncomfortably close to their 32-bit offering. Electronic Gaming Monthly later used the Neptune as an April Fools' Day prank in its April 2001 issue, claiming that Sega had discovered a warehouse of unused Neptune units available for US$199 (equivalent to $361.84 in 2025).

Although often referred to as a prototype, the physical unit shown in promotional contexts was in fact a non-functional mock-up constructed from wood and plastic, used solely to illustrate the intended industrial design of the system.

== Technical aspects and specifications ==
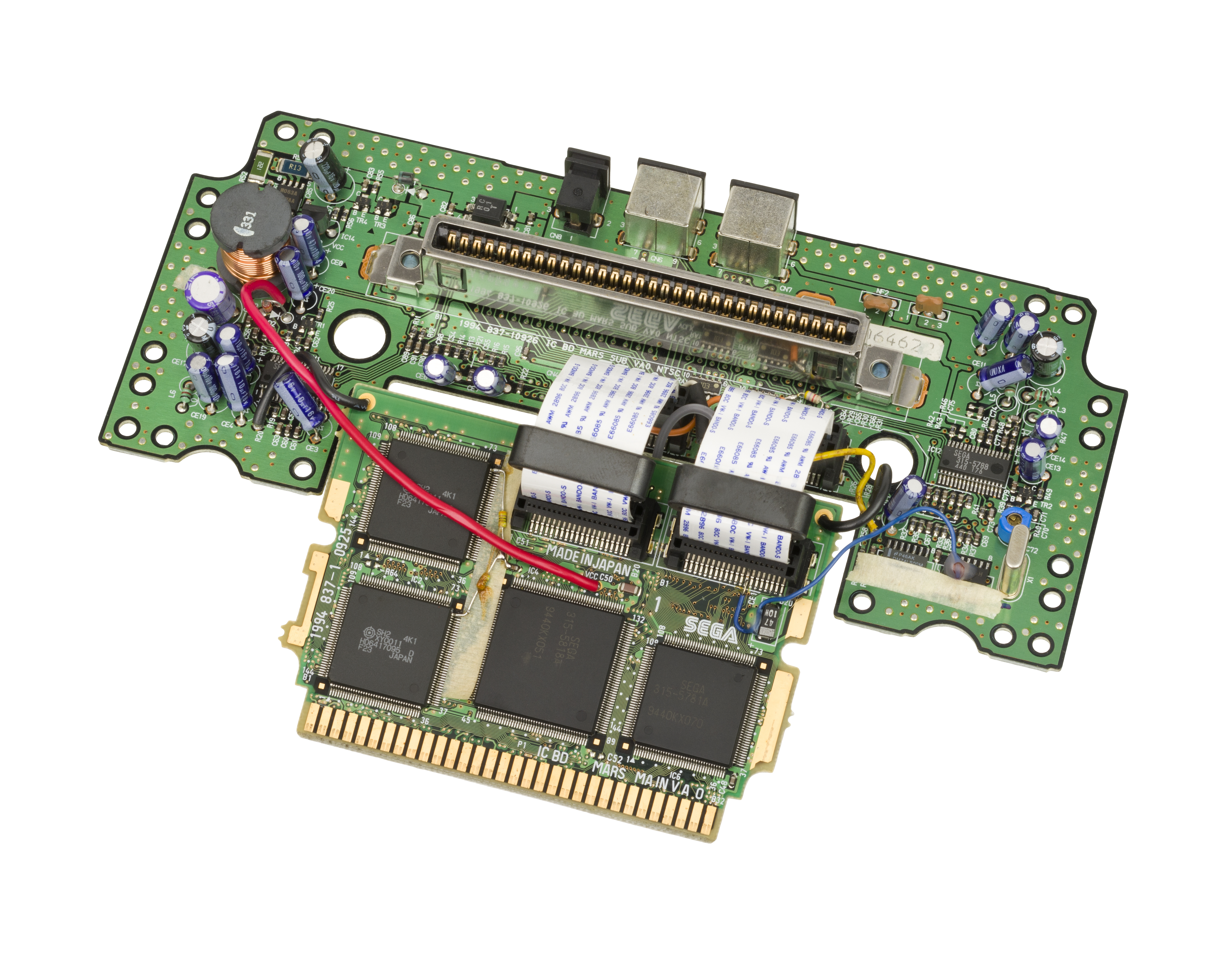
Twin Hitachi 32-bit SH-2 chips power the 32X.

The 32X can be used only in conjunction with a Genesis system. It is inserted into the system like a standard game cartridge. The add-on requires its own separate power supply, a connection cable linking it to the Genesis, and an additional conversion cable for the original model of the Genesis. As well as playing its own library of cartridges, the 32X is backwards-compatible with Genesis games, and can also be used in conjunction with the Sega CD to play games that use both add-ons. The 32X also came with a spacer so it would fit properly with the second model of the Genesis; an optional spacer was offered for use with the Sega Genesis CDX system, but ultimately never shipped due to risks of electric shock when the 32X and CDX were connected. Installation of the 32X also requires the insertion of two included electromagnetic shield plates into the Genesis' cartridge slot.

Seated on top of a Genesis, the 32X measures 115 mm × 210 mm × 100 mm (4.5 in × 8.3 in × 3.9 in). The 32X contains two Hitachi SH-2 32-bit RISC processors with a clock speed of 23 MHz, which Sega claimed would allow the system to work 40 times faster than a stand-alone Genesis. Its graphics processing unit is capable of producing 32,768 colors and rendering 50,000 polygons per second, which provides a noticeable improvement over the polygon rendering of the Genesis. The 32X also includes 256 kilobytes of random-access memory (RAM), along with 256 kilobytes of video RAM. Sound is supplied through a pulse-width modulation sound source. Input/output is supplied to a television set via a provided A/V cable that supplies composite video and stereo audio, or through an RF modulator. Stereo audio can also be played through headphones via a headphone jack on the attached Genesis.

== Game library ==
The 32X version of Doom

The 32X library consists of 40 games, including six that required both the 32X and Sega CD. Among them were ports of arcade games After Burner, Space Harrier, and Star Wars Arcade, a sidescroller with a hummingbird as a main character in Kolibri, and a 32X-exclusive Sonic the Hedgehog spinoff, Knuckles' Chaotix. Several of the games released for the 32X are enhanced ports of Genesis games, including NFL Quarterback Club and World Series Baseball '95. In a retrospective review of the console, Star Wars Arcade was considered the best game for the 32X by IGN for its cooperative play, soundtrack, and faithful reproduction of the experiences of Star Wars. In a separate review, IGN's Levi Buchanan praised the 32X game Shadow Squadron as superior to Star Wars Arcade. Retro Gamer writer Damien McFerran, however, praised Virtua Fighter as "the jewel in the 32X's crown", and GamesRadar+ named Knuckles' Chaotix as the best game for the system. Next Generation called Virtua Fighter "the colorful wreath on 32X's coffin", reflecting the consensus among contemporary critics that the game was at once arguably the 32X's best release and a clear harbinger of the platform's imminent discontinuation, since it was inferior to the already-released Saturn version of Virtua Fighter Remix, as well as the forthcoming Saturn release of Virtua Fighter 2. In response to fan inquiries, Sega stated that the 32X architecture was not powerful enough to handle a port of Virtua Fighter 2.

Despite its 32-bit processing and potential for better graphics and sound than the Genesis, most games did not take advantage of the 32X hardware. Doom for the 32X received near-perfect reviews, but was later criticized as inferior to versions for the PC and the Atari Jaguar, with missing levels, poor graphics and audio, jerky movement, and windowed gameplay. Franz believes few developers were willing to invest in designing games to work with the 32X's improved audio abilities. One cause was the rush to release games for the 32X launch; former Sega of America executive producer Michael Latham said it took "a lot of convincing" to release the 32X launch game Cosmic Carnage. With Doom, id Software programmer John Carmack had to cut a third of the levels to have the game ready for the 32X launch. Because of time limitations, game designs were intentionally conservative and did not show what the 32X hardware was able to do. Another factor was the architecture of the 32X's dual processors and graphics processor having difficulty accessing RAM, leading to developers choosing to only use one processor for their games. In an interview at the end of 1995, Sega vice president of marketing Mike Ribero insisted that Sega was not abandoning the 32X, but acknowledged that first-party support had been lackluster: "I won't lie to you, we screwed up with 32X. We overpromised and underdelivered."

== Reception and legacy ==
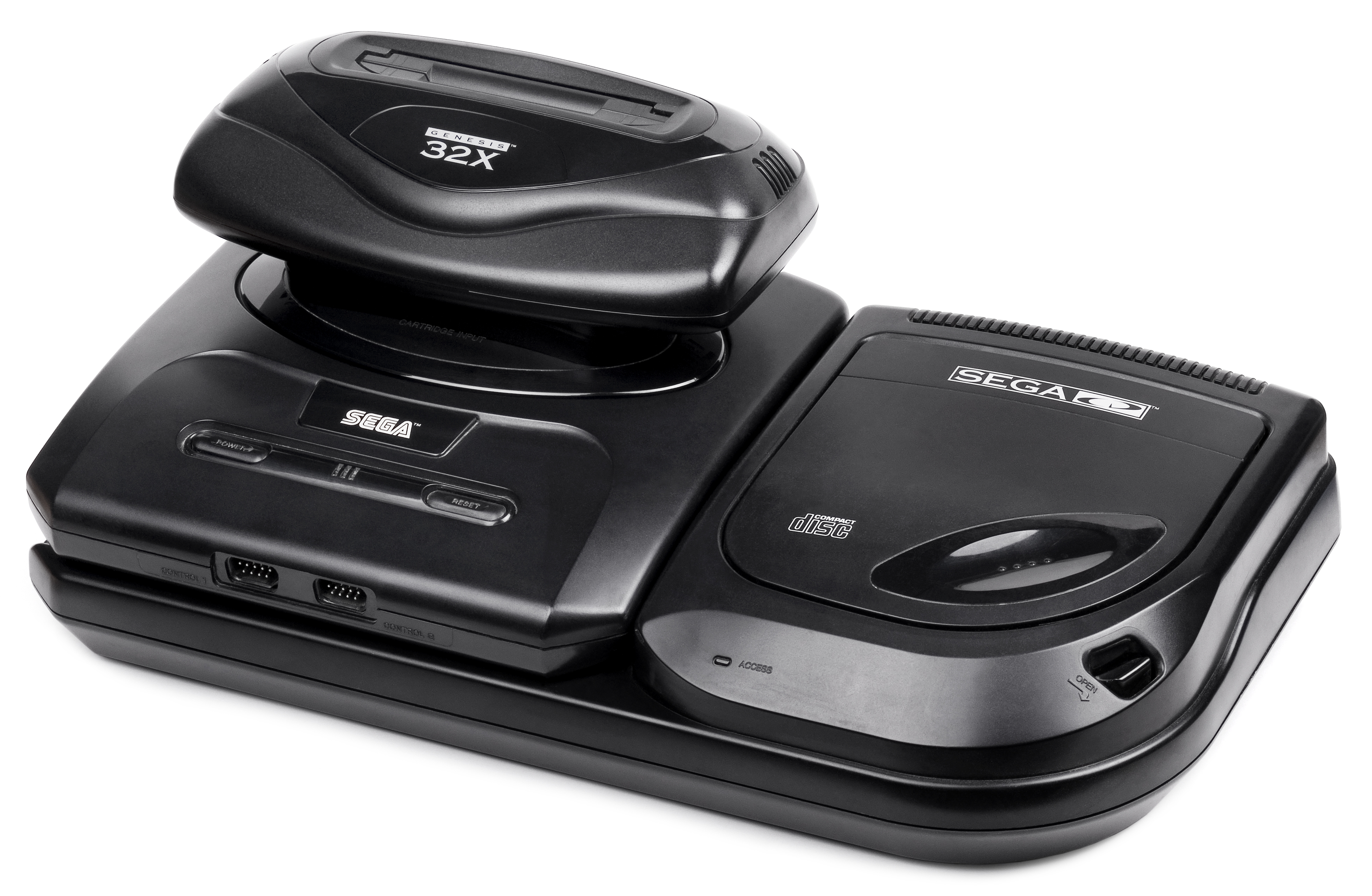
Sega Genesis with both the 32X and CD add-ons

Initial reception to the 32X and its games upon the launch of the add-on was positive. Four reviewers from Electronic Gaming Monthly graded the 32X well in their 1995 Buyer's Guide, highlighting the add-on's enhancements to the Genesis but questioning how long the system would be supported: one reviewer suggested the add-on had a "bright future" while another believed it was only meant to last until the release of the Saturn. A reviewer for GamePro commented that the 32X's multiple input and power cords make it "as complicated as setting up your VCR" and noted some performance glitches with the prototype such as freezes and overheating, but expressed confidence that the production models would perform well and gave the add-on their overall approval.

By late 1995, feedback to the add-on had soured. In its 1996 Buyer's Guide, Electronic Gaming Monthly's four reviewers scored the add-on 3, 3, 3, and 2 out of 10, criticizing the game library and Sega's abandonment of the system in favor of the Saturn. A review in Next Generation panned the 32X for its weak polygon processing, the tendency of developers to show off its capabilities with garishly colored games, and its apparent function as "simply a way of grabbing extra 1994 mind and market share while waiting for Saturn". The review gave it one out of five stars. Game Players assessed it as so much less powerful than the Saturn and PlayStation that its lower price could not be considered an enticement, and said that the vast majority of its games could have been done just as well on the Super NES. Additionally commenting that both first party and third party software support had been weak, they concluded, "The lack of support [and] good games, and the release of Saturn make the 32X a system that never was."

Retrospectively, the 32X is widely criticized as having a shallow library with a lack of support and a poor idea in the wake of the release of the Sega Saturn in Japan. 1UP.com's Jeremy Parish stated that the 32X "tainted just about everything it touched." GamesRadar+ also panned the system, placing it as their ninth-worst console with reviewer Mikel Reparaz criticizing that "it was a stopgap system that would be thrown under the bus when the Sega Saturn came out six months later, and everyone seemed to know it except for die-hard Sega fans and the company itself." Retro Gamer's Damien McFerran offered some praise for the power increase of the 32X to offer ports of Space Harrier, After Burner, and Virtua Fighter that were accurate to the original arcade versions, as well as the add-on's price point, stating, "If you didn't have deep enough pockets to afford a Saturn, then the 32X was a viable option; it's just a shame that it sold so poorly because the potential was there for true greatness." Levi Buchanan, writing for IGN, saw some sense in the move for Sega to create the 32X but criticized its implementation. According to Buchanan, "I actually thought the 32X was a better idea than the SEGA CD... The 32X, while underpowered, at least advanced the ball. Maybe it only gained a few inches in no small part due to a weak library, but at least the idea was the right one."

In particular, the console's status as an add-on and poor timing after the announcement of the Saturn has been identified by reviewers as being responsible factors for fracturing the audience for Sega's video game consoles in terms of both developers and consumers. Allgame's Scott Alan Marriott states that "[e]very add-on whittled away at the number of potential buyers and discouraged third-party companies from making the games necessary to boost sales." GamePro criticized the concept of the add-on, noting the expenses involved in purchasing the system. According to reviewer Blake Snow, "Just how many 16-bit attachments did one need? All in all, if you were one of the unlucky souls who completely bought into Sega's add-on frenzy, you would have spent a whopping $650 for something that weighed about as much as a small dog." Writing for GamesRadar+, Reparaz noted that "developers—not wanting to waste time on a technological dead-end—abandoned the 32X in droves. Gamers quickly followed suit, turning what was once a promising idea into an embarrassing footnote in console history, as well as an object lesson in why console makers shouldn't split their user base with pricey add-ons." Reparaz went on to criticize Sega's decision to release the 32X, noting that "(u)ltimately, the 32X was the product of boneheaded short-sightedness: its existence put Sega into competition with itself once the Saturn rolled out." Writing for IGN, Buchanan points out, "Notice that we haven't seen many add-ons like the 32X since 1994? I think the 32X killed the idea of an add-on like this—a power booster—permanently. And that's a good thing. Because add-ons, if not implemented properly, just splinter an audience."

Former executives at Sega have mixed opinions of the 32X. Bayless believed firmly that the 32X served as a warning to the video game industry not to risk splintering the market for consoles by creating add-ons, and was critical of the Kinect and PlayStation Move for doing so. Franz placed the 32X's commercial failure on its inability to function without an attached Genesis and lack of a CD drive, despite its compatibility with the Sega CD. Miller remembered the 32X and his vision for the console positively, but conceded that the timing was wrong with the Saturn on the horizon.
