= List of Sega CD games =

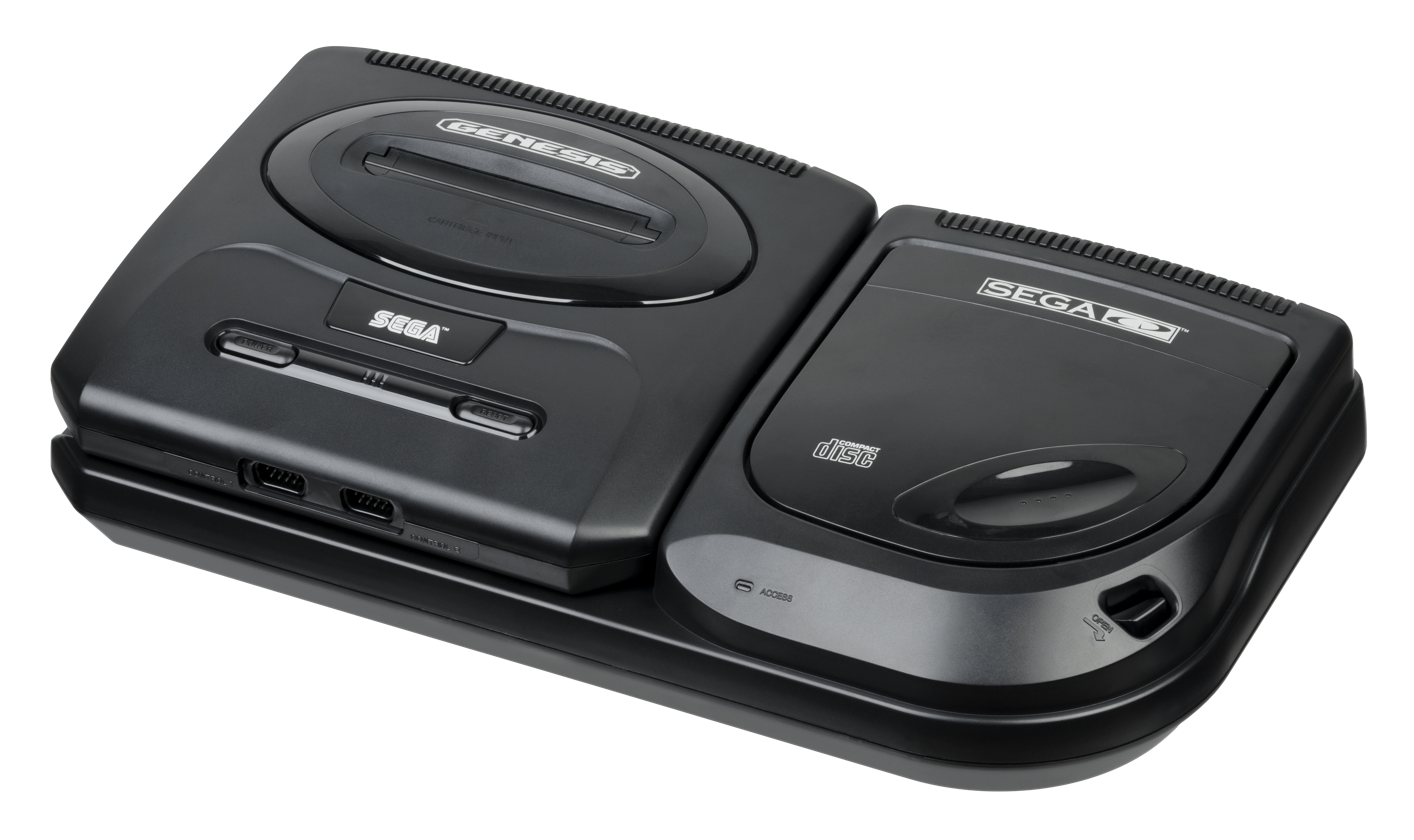
Sega CD 2 attached to a model 2 Sega Genesis

The Sega CD, originally released as the Mega-CD (メガCD, Mega-Shī Dī) in most regions outside of North America and Brazil, is an add-on device for the Sega Genesis video game console, designed and produced by Sega. It was released in Japan in 1991, North America in 1992 and in PAL regions in 1993. The device adds a CD-ROM drive to the console, allowing the user to play CD-based games and providing additional hardware functionality. It can also play audio CDs and CD+G discs. While the add-on did contain a faster central processing unit than the Genesis, as well as some enhanced graphics capabilities, the main focus of the device was to expand the size of games. The Sega CD sold 2.24 million units worldwide and was officially discontinued in 1996.

There are 207 (Note: This number is always up to date by this script) games on this list. 57 were released only in Japan, 38 were released only in North America, and 5 were released only in Europe. Of the games released, there are six titles (marked with a ^{†} in the title for the game) that were also released in formats that used a combination of the Sega CD and the 32X. Games that were announced or reported to be in development for the Sega CD, but never released, are located at the list of cancelled Sega CD games.

Region code guide
Regions released	Region description
JP	Japanese (NTSC-J) formatted release
NA	North America and other NTSC territories, besides Japan
PAL	PAL/SECAM territories: much of Europe, Australia, parts of Asia

== Games ==
Title(s)	Developer(s)	Publisher(s)	Release date		
Title(s)	Developer(s)	Publisher(s)	JP	NA	PAL
3 Ninjas Kick Back	Malibu Interactive	Sony Imagesoft	Unreleased	February 28, 1994 (Note: Released exclusively as part of a compilation with Hook.)	Unreleased
A-Rank Thunder Tanjouhen	Telenet Japan	Riot	June 25, 1993	Unreleased	Unreleased
The Adventures of Batman & Robin	Clockwork Tortoise	Sega	Unreleased	1995	December 1995
The Adventures of Willy Beamish	Infinite Laser Dog	Dynamix	Unreleased	1993	Unreleased
After Armageddon Gaiden: Majū Tōshōden Eclipse	Pandora Box	Sega	November 11, 1994	Unreleased	Unreleased
After Burner III	CRI	CRI^{JP} Sega^{WW}	December 18, 1992	1993	August 1993
Aisle Lord	Wolf Team	Wolf Team	May 29, 1992	Unreleased	Unreleased
Alshark	Right Stuff; CRC	Sandstorm	November 26, 1993	Unreleased	Unreleased
The Amazing Spider-Man vs. The Kingpin	Sega	Sega	Unreleased	1993	November 1993
Android Assault: The Revenge of Bari-Arm^{NA} Bari-Arm^{JP}	Human Entertainment	Human Entertainment^{JP} Big Fun Games^{NA}	July 30, 1993	October 1994	Unreleased
Anett Futatabi	Wolf Team	Wolf Team	March 30, 1993	Unreleased	Unreleased
Aoki Ōkami to Shiroki Mejika: Genchō Hishi	Koei	Koei	September 24, 1993	Unreleased	Unreleased
Arcus I-II-III	Wolf Team	Wolf Team	July 23, 1993	Unreleased	Unreleased
Arslān Senki	Sega	Sega	November 19, 1993	Unreleased	Unreleased
A/X-101	Micronet; Genki	Sega^{JP} Absolute Entertainment^{NA}	March 25, 1994	1994	Unreleased
Bakuden: Unbalance Zone	Kogado Software Products	Sony Music Entertainment	April 22, 1994	Unreleased	Unreleased
Batman Returns	Malibu Interactive	Sega	Unreleased	1993	August 1993
Battlecorps	Core Design	Core Design^{WW} Victor Entertainment^{JP}	September 30, 1994	August 1994	August 1994
BC Racers	Core Design	Core Design	Unreleased	February 1995	December 1994
Bill Walsh College Football	High Score Productions	EA Sports	Unreleased	December 1993	March 1994
Black Hole Assault	Micronet	Bignet USA^{NA} Micronet^{JP} Sega^{PAL}	October 23, 1992	November 1992	April 2, 1993
Bloodshot	Domark	Domark	Unreleased	Unreleased	June 1995
Bouncers	Dynamix	Sega	Unreleased	December 1994	Unreleased
Bram Stoker's Dracula	Psygnosis	Sony Imagesoft	Unreleased	November 1993	Unreleased
Brutal: Paws of Fury	GameTek	GameTek	Unreleased	November 1994	September 1994
Burai: Hachigyoku no Yūshi Densetsu	Sega	Sega	September 11, 1992	Unreleased	Unreleased
Cadillacs and Dinosaurs: The Second Cataclysm	Rocket Science Games	Rocket Science Games	Unreleased	1994	Unreleased
Capcom no Quiz Tonosama no Yabō	SIMS	SIMS	December 25, 1992	Unreleased	Unreleased
Captain Tsubasa	Tecmo	Tecmo	September 30, 1994	Unreleased	Unreleased
Chuck Rock	Core Design	Sony Imagesoft	Unreleased	1992	July 1993
Chuck Rock II: Son of Chuck	Core Design	Virgin Interactive Entertainment^{NA} Core Design^{PAL}	Unreleased	1993	January 1994
Cliffhanger	Malibu Interactive	Sony Imagesoft	Unreleased	November 1993	Unreleased
Cobra Command^{WW} Thunder Storm FX^{JP}	Wolf Team	Wolf Team^{JP} Sega^{WW}	August 28, 1992	October 15, 1992	April 2, 1993 (Note: Released exclusively as part of a two disc set with Sol-Feace as a pack-in game for that region.)
Corpse Killer †	Digital Pictures	Digital Pictures	Unreleased	November 1994	March 1995
Cosmic Fantasy Stories	Riot	Telenet Japan	March 27, 1992	Unreleased	Unreleased
Crime Patrol	American Laser Games	American Laser Games	Unreleased	October 1994	Unreleased
Cyborg 009	Telenet Japan	Riot	July 30, 1993	Unreleased	Unreleased
Daihoushinden	Flashback	Victor Entertainment	February 24, 1995	Unreleased	Unreleased
Dark Wizard	Sega	Sega	November 12, 1993	1994	Unreleased
Death Bringer	Riot	Telenet Japan	April 17, 1992	Unreleased	Unreleased
Demolition Man	Alexandria	Acclaim Entertainment	Unreleased	November 15, 1995	Unreleased
Detonator Orgun	Hot-B	Hot-B	July 31, 1992	Unreleased	Unreleased
Devastator	Wolf Team	Wolf Team	May 28, 1993	Unreleased	Unreleased
Double Switch	Digital Pictures	Sega	March 24, 1995	1993	February 1994
Dracula Unleashed	ICOM Simulations	Sega	Unreleased	1993	May 1994
Dragon's Lair	Epicenter Interactive	ReadySoft^{NA} Sega^{PAL/JP}	June 3, 1994	1993	March 1994
Dune	Cryo Interactive	Virgin Interactive Entertainment	Unreleased	December 1993	January 1994
Dungeon Explorer	Hudson Soft; Westone	Sega^{NA} Hudson Soft^{PAL}	Unreleased	May 1995	1995
Dungeon Master II: The Legend of Skullkeep	FTL Games	Victor Entertainment^{JP} JVC Musical Industries^{WW}	March 25, 1994	September 1994	1994
Dynamic Country Club	Sega AM3	Sega	July 16, 1993	Unreleased	Unreleased
Earnest Evans	Wolf Team	Wolf Team	December 20, 1991	Unreleased	Unreleased
Earthworm Jim: Special Edition	Shiny Entertainment	Interplay Productions	Unreleased	May 1995	1995
Ecco the Dolphin	Novotrade	Sega	February 24, 1995 (Note: Released exclusively in that region as part of a compilation called Ecco the Dolphin CD.)	1993	August 1993
Ecco: The Tides of Time	Novotrade	Sega	February 24, 1995 (Note: Released exclusively in that region as part of a compilation called Ecco the Dolphin CD.)	November 1994	June 1995
Egawa Suguru no Super League CD	Sega	Sega	August 6, 1993	Unreleased	Unreleased
ESPN Baseball Tonight	Sony Imagesoft	Sony Imagesoft	Unreleased	1994	1994
ESPN National Hockey Night	Sony Imagesoft	Sony Imagesoft	Unreleased	November 1994	Unreleased
ESPN NBA Hangtime '95	Sony Imagesoft	Sony Imagesoft	Unreleased	1994	Unreleased
ESPN Sunday Night NFL	Ringler Studios	Sony Imagesoft	Unreleased	November 1994	Unreleased
Eternal Champions: Challenge from the Dark Side	Sega Interactive Development Division	Sega	Unreleased	1995	May 1995
Eye of the Beholder	Opera House	Pony Canyon^{JP} Sega^{WW}	April 22, 1994	August 1994	December 1994
F1 Circus CD	Cream	Nichibutsu	March 18, 1994	Unreleased	Unreleased
Fahrenheit †	Sega	Sega	September 1, 1995	1995	May 1995
Fatal Fury Special	Funcom	Victor Entertainment^{JP} JVC Musical Industries^{WW}	March 31, 1995	1995	July 1995
FIFA International Soccer	Extended Play Productions	EA Sports	Unreleased	1994	June 1994
Final Fight CD	A Wave	Sega	April 2, 1993	April 1993	July 1993
Flashback: The Quest for Identity	Delphine Software International	Sega	Unreleased	November 1994	Unreleased
Flink	Psygnosis	Sony Electronic Publishing^{PAL} Vic Tokai^{NA}	Unreleased	February 1995	1994
Formula One World Championship: Beyond the Limit^{WW} Heavenly Symphony: Formula One World Championship 1993^{JP}	Sega	Sega	April 23, 1994	August 1994	September 1994
Gambler Jiko Chuushinha 2: Gekitou! Tokyo Mahjong Land Hen	Game Arts	Game Arts	December 18, 1992	Unreleased	Unreleased
Game no Kanzume Vol. 1	Sega	Sega	March 18, 1994	Unreleased	Unreleased
Game no Kanzume Vol. 2	Sega	Sega	March 18, 1994	Unreleased	Unreleased
Ground Zero: Texas	Digital Pictures	Sony Imagesoft	Unreleased	November 1993	February 18, 1994
Heart of the Alien	Interplay Productions	Virgin Interactive Entertainment	Unreleased	July 1994	Unreleased
Heavy Nova	Holocronet	Micronet	December 12, 1991	Unreleased	Unreleased
Heimdall	The 8th Day	Victor Entertainment^{JP} JVC Musical Industries^{NA}	March 18, 1994	April 1994	Unreleased
Hook	Core Design	Sony Imagesoft	Unreleased	1993	September 1993
Illusion City (Genei Toshi)	Aisystem Tokyo	Microcabin	May 28, 1993	Unreleased	Unreleased
INXS: Make My Video	Digital Pictures	Sega	Unreleased	October 15, 1992	August 1993
Iron Helix	Drew Pictures	Spectrum HoloByte	Unreleased	September 1994	Unreleased
Ishii Hisaichi no Daiseikai	G-Sat	Sega	January 28, 1994	Unreleased	Unreleased
Jaguar XJ220	Core Design	Victor Musical Industries^{JP} JVC Musical Industries^{NA} Sega^{PAL}	March 26, 1993	March 1993	April 2, 1993
Jango World Cup	Victor Entertainment	Victor Entertainment	August 27, 1993	Unreleased	Unreleased
Jeopardy!	Absolute Entertainment	Sony Imagesoft	Unreleased	November 1993	Unreleased
Joe Montana's NFL Football	Malibu Interactive	Sega	Unreleased	October 1993	Unreleased
Jurassic Park	Sega Multimedia Studio	Sega	September 30, 1994	1994	April 1994
Keio Flying Squadron	Victor Entertainment	Victor Entertainment^{JP} JVC Musical Industries^{WW}	August 6, 1993	November 10, 1994	December 1994
Kids on Site	Digital Pictures	Digital Pictures	Unreleased	November 1994	1994
Kris Kross: Make My Video	Digital Pictures	Sony Imagesoft	Unreleased	December 1992	September 1993
The Lawnmower Man	SCi	SCi	Unreleased	1994	November 1994
Lethal Enforcers	Konami	Konami	October 29, 1993	November 1993	December 1993
Lethal Enforcers II: Gun Fighters^{WW} Lethal Enforcers 2: The Western^{JP}	Konami	Konami	November 25, 1994	November 24, 1994	December 1994
Links: The Challenge of Golf	Papyrus Design Group	Virgin Interactive Entertainment	Unreleased	September 1994	Unreleased
Loadstar: The Legend of Tully Bodine	Rocket Science Games	Rocket Science Games	Unreleased	1994	Unreleased
Lords of Thunder	Hudson Soft; Eleven	Sega^{NA} Virgin Interactive Entertainment^{PAL}	Unreleased	1995	1995
Lunar: Eternal Blue	Game Arts; Studio Alex; Working Designs^{NA}	Game Arts^{JP} Working Designs^{NA}	December 22, 1994	September 1995	Unreleased
Lunar: The Silver Star	Game Arts; Studio Alex; Working Designs^{NA}	Game Arts^{JP} Working Designs^{NA}	June 26, 1992	December 1993	Unreleased
Mad Dog McCree	American Laser Games	American Laser Games	Unreleased	1993	Unreleased
Mad Dog II: The Lost Gold	American Laser Games	American Laser Games	Unreleased	1994	Unreleased
Mahou no Shoujo: Silky Lip	Riot	Telenet Japan	June 19, 1992	Unreleased	Unreleased
Mansion of Hidden Souls^{NA} Yumemi Yakata no Monogatari^{JP} Yumemi Mystery Mansion^{PAL}	System Sacom	Sega^{JP/PAL} Vic Tokai^{NA}	December 10, 1993	February 1994	March 1994
Marko's Magic Football	Domark	Domark	Unreleased	Unreleased	1994
Marky Mark and the Funky Bunch: Make My Video	Digital Pictures	Sega	Unreleased	October 15, 1992	Unreleased
Mary Shelley's Frankenstein	Psygnosis	Sony Imagesoft	Unreleased	1994 (Note: Released exclusively as part of a compilation with Bram Stoker's Dracula.)	Unreleased
The Masked Rider: Kamen Rider ZO^{NA} Kamen Rider ZO^{JP}	Telenet Japan	Toei Video^{JP} Sega^{NA}	May 13, 1994	1994	Unreleased
MegaRace	Cryo Interactive	The Software Toolworks	Unreleased	1994	Unreleased
Mega Schwarzschild	Kogado Studio	Sega	June 25, 1993	Unreleased	Unreleased
Mickey Mania: The Timeless Adventures of Mickey Mouse	Traveller's Tales	Sony Imagesoft	Unreleased	October 26, 1994	October 28, 1994
Microcosm	Psygnosis	Psygnosis^{WW} Victor Entertainment^{JP}	February 25, 1994	December 22, 1993	January 1994
Midnight Raiders	Stargate Productions	Sega	Unreleased	October 1994	March 1995
Might and Magic III: Isles of Terra	New World Computing	CRI	November 26, 1993	Unreleased	Unreleased
Mighty Morphin Power Rangers	Orion Technologies	Sega	Unreleased	1994	March 1995
Mortal Kombat	Probe Software	Arena Entertainment^{WW} Acclaim Entertainment^{JP}	June 3, 1994	April 1994	July 1994
My Paint: The Animated Paint Program	WayForward	Saddleback Graphics	Unreleased	1994	Unreleased
NBA Jam	Iguana Entertainment	Acclaim Entertainment	December 20, 1994	December 1994	1994
NFL Football Trivia Challenge	CapDisc	CapDisc	Unreleased	November 1994	Unreleased
NFL's Greatest: San Francisco vs. Dallas 1978-1993	Park Place Productions	Sega	Unreleased	October 1993	Unreleased
NHL '94	High Score Productions	EA Sports	Unreleased	1993	March 1994
Night Striker	Aisystem Tokyo	Taito	May 28, 1993	Unreleased	Unreleased
Night Trap †	Digital Pictures	Sega	November 19, 1993	October 15, 1992	June 1993
The Ninja Warriors	Aisystem Tokyo	Taito	March 12, 1993	Unreleased	Unreleased
Nobunaga no Yabō: Haōden	Koei	Koei	March 25, 1994	Unreleased	Unreleased
Nostalgia 1907	Takeru	Sur Dé Wave	December 14, 1991	Unreleased	Unreleased
Novastorm	Psygnosis	Sony Electronic Publishing^{PAL} Psygnosis^{NA}	Unreleased	1995	November 1994
Panic!^{NA} Switch^{JP}	Sega; Office I	Sega^{JP} Data East USA^{NA}	April 23, 1993	October 1994	Unreleased
Pitfall: The Mayan Adventure	Activision	Activision	Unreleased	November 1994	December 1994
Popful Mail	Sega Falcom; Working Designs^{NA}	Sega^{JP} Working Designs^{NA}	April 1, 1994	February 23, 1995	Unreleased
Power Factory Featuring C+C Music Factory	Digital Pictures	Sony Imagesoft	Unreleased	1993	September 1993
Powermonger	Sprytes	Electronic Arts	Unreleased	January 1994	April 1994
Prince of Persia	Bits Laboratory	Victor Musical Industries^{JP} Sega^{WW}	August 7, 1992	1992	April 2, 1993
Prize Fighter	Digital Pictures	Sega	March 24, 1995	1993	March 1994
Pro Yakyū Super League CD	Sega	Sega	October 30, 1992	Unreleased	Unreleased
Psychic Detective Series Vol. 3: Aýa	DataWest	DataWest	January 3, 1993	Unreleased	Unreleased
Psychic Detective Series Vol. 4: Orgel	DataWest	DataWest	December 10, 1993	Unreleased	Unreleased
Puggsy	Traveller's Tales	Psygnosis	Unreleased	January 6, 1994	November 1993
Quiz Scramble Special	Sega	Sega	May 29, 1992	Unreleased	Unreleased
Racing Aces	Hammond & Leyland	Sega	Unreleased	1993	Unreleased
Radical Rex	Beam Software	Activision	Unreleased	November 1994	Unreleased
Ranma ½: Byukuran Aika	Klon	Masaya	April 23, 1993	Unreleased	Unreleased
RDF Global Conflict	Absolute Entertainment	Absolute Entertainment	Unreleased	November 1994	Unreleased
Record of Lodoss War	Kogado Studio	Sega	May 20, 1994	Unreleased	Unreleased
Revenge of the Ninja	Wolf Team	Renovation Products	Unreleased	1994	Unreleased
Revengers of Vengeance^{NA} Battle Fantasy^{JP}	Micronet	Micronet^{JP} Extreme Entertainment Group^{NA}	April 15, 1994	July 1994	Unreleased
Rise of the Dragon	Game Arts	Sega	September 25, 1992	1993	Unreleased
Road Avenger^{WW} Road Blaster FX^{JP}	Wolf Team	Wolf Team^{JP} Renovation Products^{NA} Sega^{PAL}	December 18, 1992	March 1993	April 1993
Road Rash	Monkey Do Productions; New Level Software	Electronic Arts	Unreleased	March 1995	Unreleased
Robo Aleste^{WW} Dennin Aleste^{JP}	Compile	Compile^{JP} Sega^{PAL} Tengen^{NA}	November 27, 1992	August 1993	April 1993
Samurai Shodown	Funcom	JVC Musical Industries	Unreleased	January 1995	June 1995
San Diego Zoo Presents: The Animals!	Arnowitz Studios	The Software Toolworks^{NA} Mindscape^{PAL}	Unreleased	1994	September 1994
Sangokushi III	Koei	Koei	April 23, 1993	Unreleased	Unreleased
The Secret of Monkey Island	LucasArts	Victor Entertainment^{JP} JVC Musical Industries^{NA}	September 23, 1993	1993	Unreleased
Sega Classics Arcade Collection (4-in-1)	Sega	Sega	April 23, 1993	October 15, 1992	Unreleased
Sega Classics Arcade Collection (5-in-1)	Sega	Sega	Unreleased	1994	April 2, 1993 (Note: Released exclusively as a pack-in game for that region.)
Seima Densetsu 3×3 Eyes	Sega	Sega	July 23, 1993	Unreleased	Unreleased
Seireishin Seiki Fhey Area	Wolf Team	Wolf Team	February 18, 1992	Unreleased	Unreleased
Sengoku Denshou	SNK	Sammy	December 28, 1993	Unreleased	Unreleased
Sensible Soccer^{PAL} Championship Soccer '94^{NA}	Psygnosis	Sony Imagesoft	Unreleased	September 1994	July 1994
Sewer Shark	Digital Pictures	Sony Imagesoft	Unreleased	November 1992	June 1993
Shadow of the Beast II	Digital Developments	Psygnosis^{WW} Victor Entertainment^{JP}	July 29, 1994	1994	May 1994
Shadowrun	Compile	Compile	February 23, 1996	Unreleased	Unreleased
Sherlock Holmes: Consulting Detective	ICOM Simulations	Sega	Unreleased	November 1992	April 1993
Sherlock Holmes: Consulting Detective Vol. II	ICOM Simulations	Sega	Unreleased	1993	September 1993
Shin Megami Tensei	SIMS	SIMS	February 25, 1994	Unreleased	Unreleased
Shining Force CD	Sonic! Software Planning	Sega	July 22, 1994	March 1995	April 1995
Silpheed	Game Arts	Game Arts^{JP} Sega^{WW}	July 30, 1993	October 1993	September 1993
SimEarth	Game Arts	Sega	March 12, 1993	Unreleased	Unreleased
Slam City with Scottie Pippen †	Digital Pictures	Digital Pictures	Unreleased	November 1994	February 1995
The Smurfs	Malibu Interactive	Infogrames	Unreleased	Unreleased	June 1995
Snatcher	Konami	Konami	Unreleased	January 1995	December 15, 1994
Sol-Feace	Wolf Team	Wolf Team^{JP} Sega^{WW}	December 12, 1991	October 15, 1992	April 2, 1993 (Note: Released exclusively as part of a two disc set with Cobra Command as a pack-in game for that region.)
Sonic CD	Sega	Sega	September 23, 1993	November 23, 1993	November 23, 1993
Soulstar	Core Design	Core Design^{WW} Victor Entertainment^{JP}	December 22, 1994	September 1994	October 1994
Space Ace	ReadySoft	ReadySoft	Unreleased	1994	Unreleased
The Space Adventure	Hudson Soft	Hudson Soft	Unreleased	June 1995	July 1995
Starblade	Technosoft	Namco^{NA/JP} Sega^{PAL}	October 28, 1994	September 1994	December 1994
Star Wars Chess	The Software Toolworks	The Software Toolworks^{NA} Mindscape^{PAL}	Unreleased	May 1994	October 1994
Star Wars: Rebel Assault	LucasArts	JVC Musical Industries^{WW} Victor Entertainment^{JP}	September 22, 1994	March 1994	September 1994
Stellar-Fire	Infinite Laser Dog	Dynamix	Unreleased	December 1993	Unreleased
Supreme Warrior †	Digital Pictures	Digital Pictures	Unreleased	November 1994	February 1995
Surgical Strike †	The Code Monkeys	Sega	December 22, 1995	June 1995	September 1995
Syndicate	Bullfrog Productions	Domark	Unreleased	Unreleased	June 1995
Tenbu Mega CD Special	Wolf Team	Wolf Team	December 25, 1992	Unreleased	Unreleased
Tenka Fubu: Eiyuutachi no Houkou	Game Arts	Game Arts	December 28, 1991	Unreleased	Unreleased
The Terminator	Virgin Games	Virgin Games	Unreleased	December 1993	December 1993
Theme Park	Bullfrog Productions	Domark	Unreleased	Unreleased	1995
The Third World War	Micronet	Micronet^{JP} Extreme Entertainment Group^{NA}	November 26, 1993	1994	Unreleased
Thunderhawk^{PAL/JP} AH-3 Thunderstrike^{NA}	Core Design	Core Design^{PAL} Victor Entertainment^{JP} JVC Musical Industries^{NA}	September 17, 1993	1993	September 1, 1993
Time Gal	Wolf Team	Wolf Team^{JP} Renovation Products^{NA} Sega^{PAL}	November 13, 1992	May 1993	September 1993
Tomcat Alley	The Code Monkeys	Sega	December 22, 1994	March 1994	May 1994
Trivial Pursuit	Western Technologies	Virgin Interactive Entertainment	Unreleased	1994	Unreleased
Ultraverse Prime	Malibu Interactive	Sony Imagesoft	Unreleased	1994 (Note: Released exclusively as part of a compilation with Microcosm.)	Unreleased
Urusei Yatsura: Dear My Friends	Game Arts	Game Arts	April 15, 1994	Unreleased	Unreleased
Vay^{NA} Vay: Ryuusei no Yoroi^{JP}	Hertz	SIMS^{JP} Working Designs^{NA}	October 22, 1993	July 1994	Unreleased
Wakusei Woodstock: Funky Horror Band	Advance Communications Company	Sega	December 20, 1991	Unreleased	Unreleased
Warau Salesman	Compile	Sega	September 17, 1993	Unreleased	Unreleased
Wheel of Fortune	Absolute Entertainment	Sony Imagesoft	Unreleased	1994	Unreleased
Who Shot Johnny Rock?	American Laser Games	American Laser Games	Unreleased	1994	Unreleased
Wild Woody	Sega Multimedia Studio	Sega	Unreleased	September 1995	Unreleased
Wing Commander	Game Arts	Electronic Arts^{NA} Sega^{JP}	March 25, 1994	1994	Unreleased
Winning Post	Koei	Koei	September 17, 1993	Unreleased	Unreleased
Wirehead	The Code Monkeys	Sega; MGM Interactive	Unreleased	September 1995	Unreleased
Wolfchild	Core Design	JVC Musical Industries^{NA} Victor Musical Industries^{JP} Sega^{PAL}	March 19, 1993	December 1992	April 2, 1993
Wonder Dog	Core Design	Victor Musical Industries^{JP} JVC Musical Industries^{WW}	September 25, 1992	1992	January 1994
Wondermega Collection	JVC	Victor Musical Industries	January 4, 1992	Unreleased	Unreleased
World Cup USA '94	Tiertex Design Studios	U.S. Gold	Unreleased	1994	June 3, 1994
WWF Rage in the Cage^{WW} WWF Mania Tour^{JP}	Sculptured Software	Arena Entertainment^{WW} Acclaim Entertainment^{JP}	June 24, 1994	November 1993	January 1994
Yumimi Mix	Game Arts	Game Arts	January 29, 1993	Unreleased	Unreleased

== Non-game software ==
Title(s)	Developer(s)	Publisher(s)	Release date		
Title(s)	Developer(s)	Publisher(s)	JP	NA	PAL
Colors of Modern Rock	Digital Pictures	Sega	Unreleased	1993	Unreleased
Compton's Interactive Encyclopedia	Compton's NewMedia	Compton's NewMedia	Unreleased	1994	Unreleased
Flux	EXP	Virgin Interactive Entertainment	Unreleased	Unreleased	August 28, 1995
Fresh Cleaner	Mumin	Mumin	October 8, 1993	Unreleased	Unreleased

== See also ==
- List of cancelled Sega CD games
- List of Sega Genesis games
- List of 32X games
