= 1992 in video games =

1992 saw many sequels and prequels in video games, such as Dragon Quest V, Final Fantasy V, Sonic the Hedgehog 2, Street Fighter II: Champion Edition, Super Mario Land 2: 6 Golden Coins, Streets of Rage 2, and Super Mario Kart, along with new titles such as Art of Fighting, Lethal Enforcers, Mortal Kombat and Virtua Racing.

The year's highest-grossing video game worldwide was Capcom's arcade fighting game Street Fighter II for the second year in a row, while also being the year's highest-grossing entertainment product. The year's best-selling home system was the Game Boy for the third year in a row, while the year's best-selling home video games were Sonic the Hedgehog 2 for the Mega Drive/Genesis and the Super Nintendo Entertainment System port of Street Fighter II, which were both also the year's highest-grossing home entertainment products.

== Legend ==
Video game platforms
AMI	Amiga	Arcade	Arcade video game	ATRST	Atari ST, Atari Falcon
DOS	PC DOS / MS-DOS, Windows 3.X	GB	Game Boy	GG	Game Gear
GEN	Genesis / Mega Drive	IBM	IBM PC, IBM PC compatible	LYNX	Atari Lynx
MAC	Classic Mac OS, 2001 and before	NEO	Neo Geo AES	NES	Nintendo Entertainment System / Famicom
PC88	PC-8800 series	PC98	PC-9800 series	PCD	TurboGrafx-CD / PC Engine CD-ROM²
PCE	TurboGrafx-16 / PC Engine	SCD	Sega CD / Mega-CD	SMS	Master System
SNES	Super NES / Super Famicom / Super Comboy				

Video game genres
Action	Action game	Action-adventure	Action-adventure game	Adventure	Adventure game
Brawler	Beat 'em up	Educational	Educational video game	Fighting	Fighting game
FPS	First-person shooter	Platformer	Platformer	Puzzle	Puzzle video game
Racing	Racing video game	RPG	Role-playing video game	RTS	Real-time strategy
Shoot 'em up	Shoot 'em up	Simulation	Simulation video game	Sports	Sports video game

== Hardware releases ==
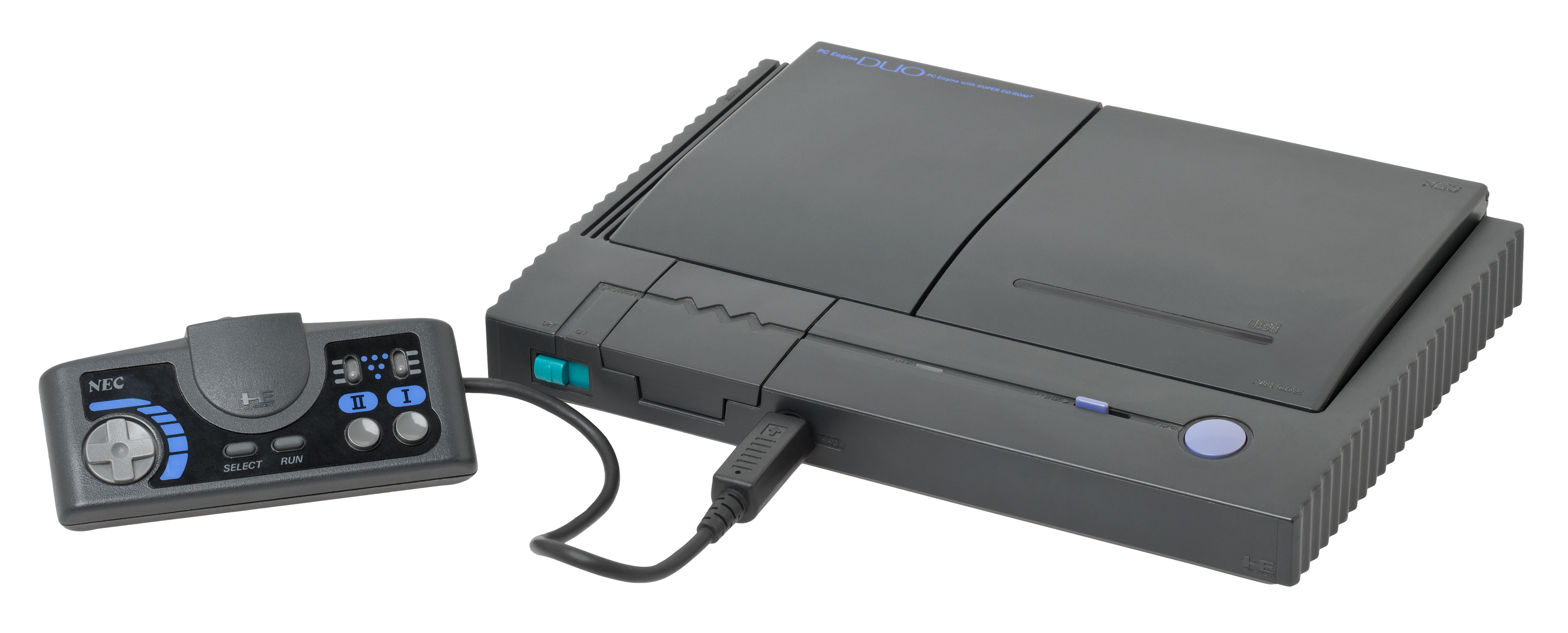
TurboDuo, the North American version of the PC Engine Duo.

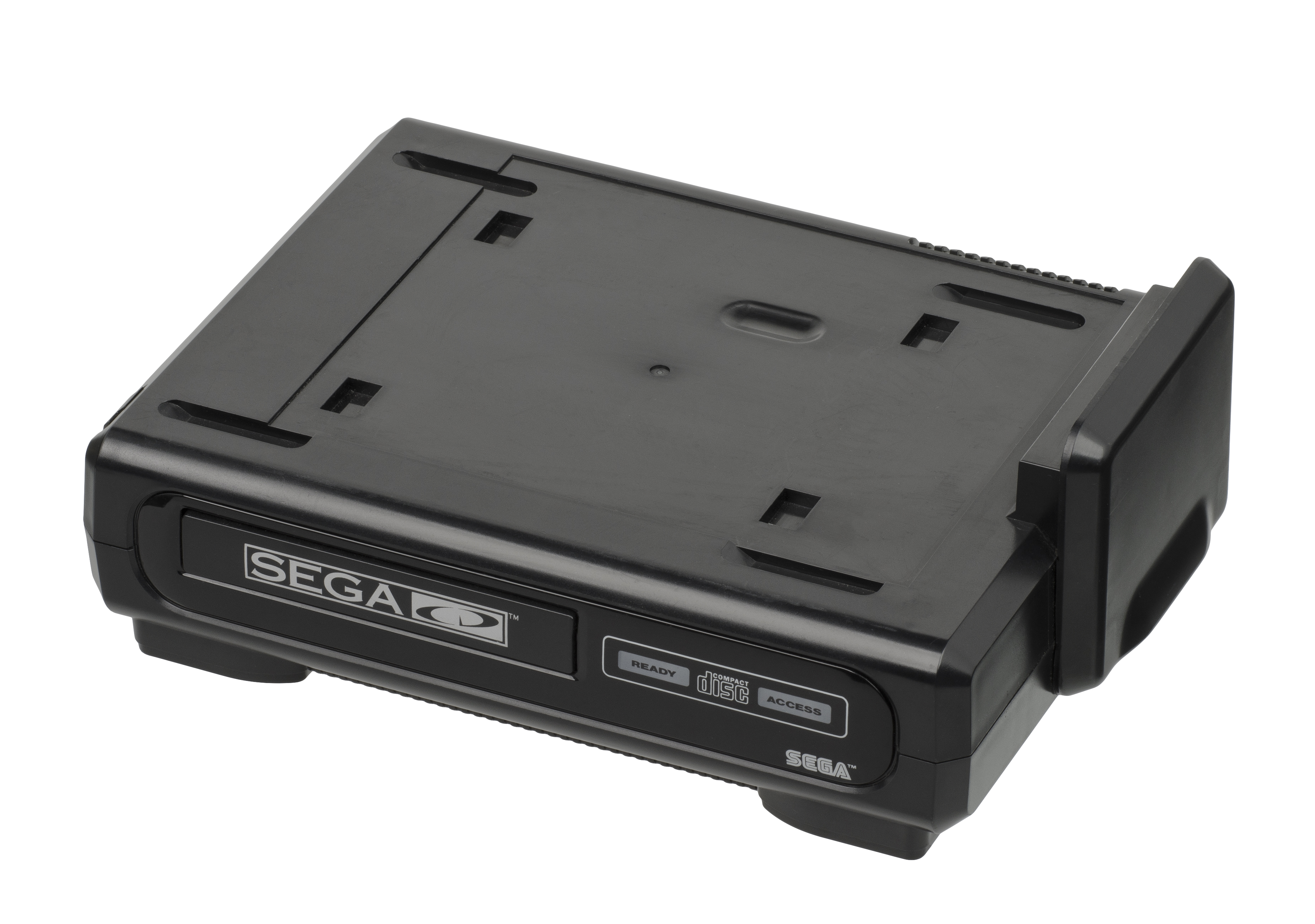
Sega CD, the North American version of the Mega-CD.

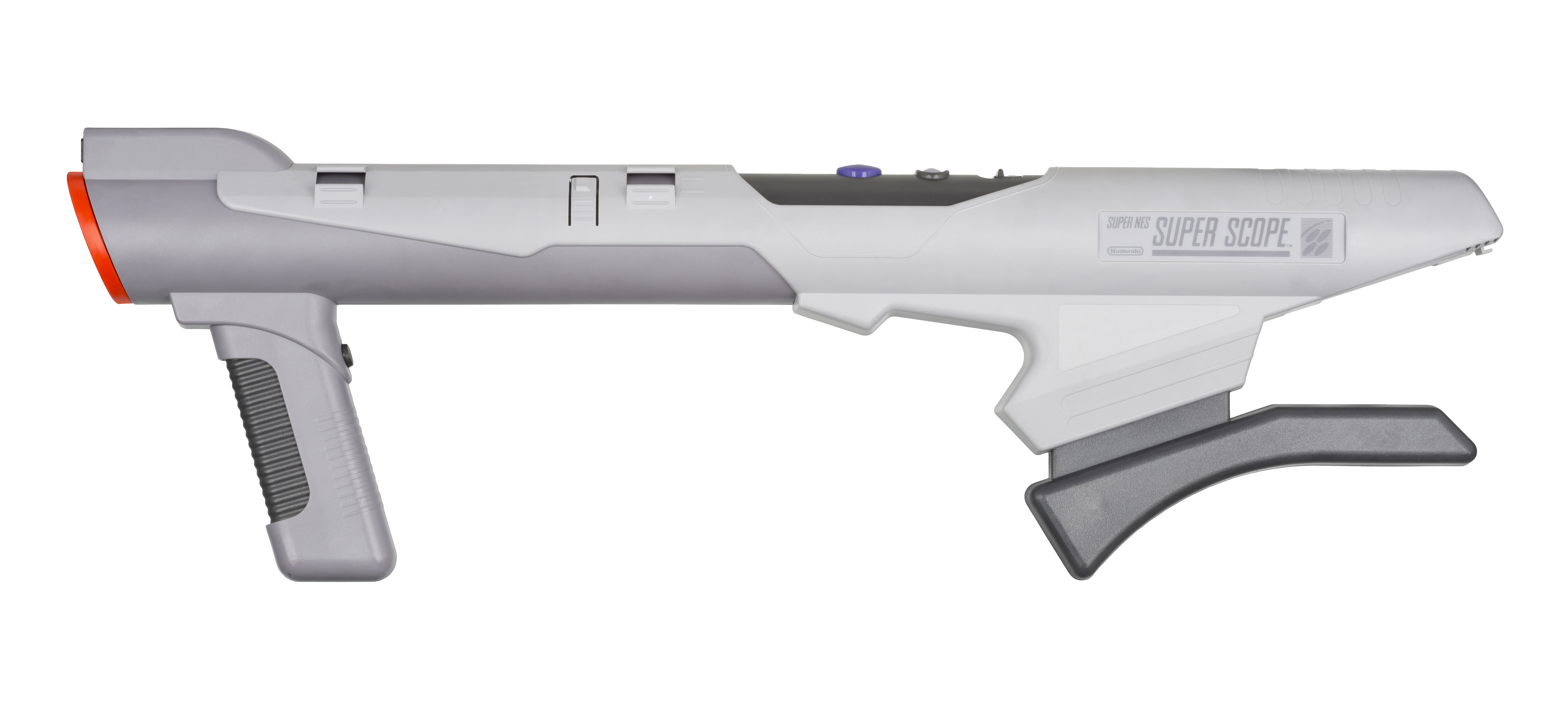
Super Scope

- April 11 – The Super NES releases in Ireland and the United Kingdom.
- June - The Super NES releases in the rest of Europe.
- June 8 - The Super NES releases in Chile.
- July 3 - The Super NES releases in the Australasia region.
- October – Sega releases the Model 1, Sega's first arcade system board supporting 3D polygon graphics.
- October 10 - The PC Engine Duo releases in North America as the TurboDuo, an updated version of the TurboGrafx-16 with built-in CD-ROM drive and Super System Card for Super CD-ROM² support.
- October 15 - Sega releases the Mega-CD as Sega CD (an add-on for the Sega Genesis) in North America, almost a year after the equivalent Japanese launch.
- October 21 - The Amiga 1200 computer is released. It's the final lower-cost Amiga model before Commodore's bankruptcy.
- Namco releases the System 22, an arcade system board that introduces 3D texture mapping and Gouraud shading.
- JVC releases the Wondermega console in Japan, a combined Mega Drive and Mega CD.
- Nintendo releases the Super Scope for the Super NES.

== Top-rated games ==
=== Game of the Year awards ===
The following titles won Game of the Year awards for 1992.

Awards	Game of the Year	Publisher	Genre	Platform	Ref
Chicago Tribune	Street Fighter II	Capcom	Fighting	SNES	
Electronic Gaming Awards	Street Fighter II	Capcom	Fighting	SNES	
Electronic Gaming Monthly (EGM)	Street Fighter II	Capcom	Fighting	SNES	
European Computer Trade Show (ECTS)	Street Fighter II	Capcom	Fighting	SNES	
GameFan Golden Megawards	Street Fighter II	Capcom	Fighting	SNES	
Game Informer	Street Fighter II	Capcom	Fighting	SNES	
Golden Joystick Awards	Street Fighter II	Capcom	Fighting	SNES	
Gamest Awards	Street Fighter II Dash (Champion Edition)	Capcom	Fighting	Arcade	
Chicago Tribune	The Legend of Zelda: A Link to the Past	Nintendo	Action-adventure	SNES	
Computer Gaming World	Links 386 Pro (Note: Until 1994, Computer Gaming World's eligibility period followed the "commercial year" (June to June) instead of the calendar year. In this instance, the winner for the period June 1992 to June 1993 was released in the 1992 calendar year.)	Access Software	Sports	DOS	
GameFan Golden Megawards	Cybernator (Assault Suits Valken)	Masaya Games	Run and gun	SNES	
GameFan Golden Megawards	Streets of Rage 2	Sega	Brawler	GEN	
GameFan Golden Megawards	Wonderdog	JVC Musical Industries	Platformer	SCD	
PC Engine Fan	Far East of Eden II: Manji Maru	Hudson Soft	RPG	PCD	

=== Famitsu Platinum Hall of Fame ===
The following video game releases in 1992 entered Famitsu magazine's "Platinum Hall of Fame" for receiving Famitsu scores of at least 35 out of 40.

Title	Developer	Publisher	Score (out of 40)	Genre	Platform
Dragon Quest V: Tenkū no Hanayome	Chunsoft	Enix	36	RPG	SNES
Shin Megami Tensei	Atlus	Atlus	36	RPG	SNES
I Love Mickey & Donald: Fushigi na Magic Box (World of Illusion)	Sega AM7	Sega	36	Platformer	SCD
Street Fighter II	Capcom	Capcom	35	Fighting	SNES
Mario Paint	Nintendo R&D1	Nintendo	35	Art	SNES

== Financial performance ==
=== Highest-grossing arcade games ===
The year's highest-grossing game worldwide was Street Fighter II, which alone accounted for an estimated 60% of the global arcade game market, according to Coinslot magazine. The following table lists the year's top-grossing arcade games in Japan, the United Kingdom, United States, and worldwide.

Market	Title	Coin drop revenue	Inflation	Manufacturer	Genre	Ref
Japan	Street Fighter II: The World Warrior	Unknown	Unknown	Capcom	Fighting	
United Kingdom	Street Fighter II: The World Warrior	$456 million	$1,046 million	Capcom	Fighting	
United States	Street Fighter II / Champion Edition	Unknown	Unknown	Capcom	Fighting	
Worldwide	Street Fighter II: The World Warrior			Capcom	Fighting	

==== Japan ====
The following titles were the top ten highest-grossing arcade games of 1992 in Japan, according to Gamest, Game Machine and Famicom Tsūshin (Famitsu) magazines.

Rank	Gamest	Game Machine			Famicom Tsūshin (Famitsu)
Rank	Gamest	Title	Type	Points	Famicom Tsūshin (Famitsu)
1	Street Fighter II: The World Warrior	Street Fighter II / Dash	Software kit	7795	Street Fighter II: The World Warrior
2	Street Fighter II Dash (Champion Edition)	Final Lap 2	Standard/deluxe	3821	Final Lap 2
3	Captain Commando	F1 Exhaust Note	Dedicated	3464	Street Fighter II Dash
4	Garō Densetsu: Shukumei no Tatakai (Fatal Fury)	Tetris (Sega)	Software kit	3402	F1 Exhaust Note
5	Final Lap 2	Columns	Software kit	3218	Final Lap
6	Knights of the Round	Super Volley '91 (Power Spikes)	Software kit	3140	Coca-Cola Suzuka 8 Hours
7	Sonic Wings (Aero Fighters)	Terminator 2: Judgment Day	Dedicated	2937	Super Monaco GP
8	F-1 Grand Prix	Clutch Hitter	Software kit	2748	Driver's Eyes
9	WWF WrestleFest	Garō Densetsu: Shukumei no Tatakai	Software kit	2401	Tetris (Sega)
10	Hacha Mecha Fighter	Super Monaco GP	Standard/deluxe	2347	Virtua Racing

==== United States ====
In the United States, the following titles were the highest-grossing arcade video games of 1992.

Rank	RePlay	Play Meter	Amusement & Music Operators Association (AMOA)		AMAA
Rank	RePlay	Play Meter	Dedicated arcade cabinet	Arcade conversion kit	AMAA
1	Street Fighter II / Champion Edition	Street Fighter II	Street Fighter II: Champion Edition	WWF WrestleFest	Street Fighter II: Champion Edition, Mortal Kombat, Neo Geo MVS, Terminator 2: Judgment Day
2	World Heroes, Art of Fighting, X-Men, Lethal Enforcers, Mortal Kombat, Steel Talons, Space Lords, Final Lap 2 / Final Lap 3, Coca-Cola Suzuka 8 Hours, Virtua Racing	Unknown	Street Fighter II: The World Warrior, Terminator 2: Judgment Day, Race Drivin', X-Men	Captain America and The Avengers, Road Riot 4WD, Sunset Riders, Super High Impact	Street Fighter II: Champion Edition, Mortal Kombat, Neo Geo MVS, Terminator 2: Judgment Day
3	World Heroes, Art of Fighting, X-Men, Lethal Enforcers, Mortal Kombat, Steel Talons, Space Lords, Final Lap 2 / Final Lap 3, Coca-Cola Suzuka 8 Hours, Virtua Racing	Unknown	Street Fighter II: The World Warrior, Terminator 2: Judgment Day, Race Drivin', X-Men	Captain America and The Avengers, Road Riot 4WD, Sunset Riders, Super High Impact	Street Fighter II: Champion Edition, Mortal Kombat, Neo Geo MVS, Terminator 2: Judgment Day
4	World Heroes, Art of Fighting, X-Men, Lethal Enforcers, Mortal Kombat, Steel Talons, Space Lords, Final Lap 2 / Final Lap 3, Coca-Cola Suzuka 8 Hours, Virtua Racing	Unknown	Street Fighter II: The World Warrior, Terminator 2: Judgment Day, Race Drivin', X-Men	Captain America and The Avengers, Road Riot 4WD, Sunset Riders, Super High Impact	Street Fighter II: Champion Edition, Mortal Kombat, Neo Geo MVS, Terminator 2: Judgment Day
5	World Heroes, Art of Fighting, X-Men, Lethal Enforcers, Mortal Kombat, Steel Talons, Space Lords, Final Lap 2 / Final Lap 3, Coca-Cola Suzuka 8 Hours, Virtua Racing	Unknown	Street Fighter II: The World Warrior, Terminator 2: Judgment Day, Race Drivin', X-Men	Captain America and The Avengers, Road Riot 4WD, Sunset Riders, Super High Impact	Suzuka 8 Hours
6	World Heroes, Art of Fighting, X-Men, Lethal Enforcers, Mortal Kombat, Steel Talons, Space Lords, Final Lap 2 / Final Lap 3, Coca-Cola Suzuka 8 Hours, Virtua Racing	Unknown	—N/a		—N/a
7	World Heroes, Art of Fighting, X-Men, Lethal Enforcers, Mortal Kombat, Steel Talons, Space Lords, Final Lap 2 / Final Lap 3, Coca-Cola Suzuka 8 Hours, Virtua Racing	Unknown	—N/a		—N/a
8	World Heroes, Art of Fighting, X-Men, Lethal Enforcers, Mortal Kombat, Steel Talons, Space Lords, Final Lap 2 / Final Lap 3, Coca-Cola Suzuka 8 Hours, Virtua Racing	Unknown	—N/a		—N/a
9	World Heroes, Art of Fighting, X-Men, Lethal Enforcers, Mortal Kombat, Steel Talons, Space Lords, Final Lap 2 / Final Lap 3, Coca-Cola Suzuka 8 Hours, Virtua Racing	Unknown	—N/a		—N/a
10	World Heroes, Art of Fighting, X-Men, Lethal Enforcers, Mortal Kombat, Steel Talons, Space Lords, Final Lap 2 / Final Lap 3, Coca-Cola Suzuka 8 Hours, Virtua Racing	Unknown	—N/a		—N/a

==== Australia ====
On Australia's Timezone monthly arcade charts published in the June 1992 issue of Leisure Line magazine, Capcom's Street Fighter II: Champion Edition was the top-grossing arcade conversion kit and Konami's X-Men was the top-grossing dedicated arcade cabinet.

=== Best-selling home systems ===
Rank	System(s)	Manufacturer	Type	Sales				
Rank	System(s)	Manufacturer	Type	Japan	USA	Europe	Korea	Worldwide
1	GB	Nintendo	Handheld	1,910,000	4,000,000	6,000,000	Unknown	11,910,000+
2	SNES	Nintendo	Console	3,580,000	5,600,000	2,030,000	20,000	11,230,000+
3	GEN	Sega	Console	400,000	5,100,000	2,660,000	76,000	8,236,000+
4	NES	Nintendo	Console	820,000	2,700,000	3,030,000	110,000	6,660,000+
5	IBM	IBM	Computer	—N/a	—N/a	—N/a	—N/a	3,400,000
6	MAC	Apple Inc.	Computer	—N/a	—N/a	—N/a	—N/a	2,500,000
7	SMS	Sega	Console	—N/a	< 50,000	2,235,000	180,000	2,415,000+
8	Compaq (IBM)	Compaq	Computer	—N/a	—N/a	—N/a	—N/a	1,500,000
9	GG	Sega	Handheld	250,000	800,000	320,000+ (UK)	Unknown	1,370,000+
10	PC88, PC98	NEC	Computer	1,120,000	Unknown	Unknown	Unknown	1,120,000+

=== Best-selling home video games ===
Sonic the Hedgehog 2 and Street Fighter II each sold 5 million units worldwide in 1992, making them the year's highest-grossing entertainment products. The following home video games sold more than 1 million units worldwide in 1992.

Rank	Title	Platform	Sales				Revenue	
Rank	Title	Platform	Japan	United States	Europe	Worldwide	Nominal	Inflation
1	Sonic the Hedgehog 2	GEN	Unknown	2,000,000	1,750,000+	5,000,000	$450 million	$1,030 million
1	Street Fighter II	SNES	2,000,000+	2,000,000	200,000+	5,000,000	Unknown	Unknown
3	Dragon Quest V: Tenkū no Hanayome	SNES	2,800,000	—N/a	—N/a	2,800,000+	$200 million+	$460 million+
4	Super Mario Kart	SNES	2,000,000+	< 1,000,000	—N/a	2,000,000+	Unknown	
4	Final Fantasy V	SNES	2,000,000+	—N/a	—N/a	2,000,000+	Unknown	
6	The Legend of Zelda: A Link to the Past	SNES	Unknown	1,000,000	Unknown	1,000,000+	Unknown	

The following table lists the year's top-selling home video game releases in several markets, including Europe, Japan, South Korea, and the United States.

Market	Title	Platform	Sales	Ref
Europe	Sonic the Hedgehog 2	GEN	1,750,000+	
Japan	Dragon Quest V: Tenkū no Hanayome	SNES	2,800,000	
South Korea	Street Fighter II	SNES	Unknown	
United States	Sonic the Hedgehog 2	GEN	2,000,000	
United States	Street Fighter II	SNES	2,000,000	

==== Asia ====
In Japan and South Korea, according to Famicom Tsūshin (Famitsu) magazine, the following titles were the top ten best-selling home video game releases of 1992.

Rank	Japan			South Korea	
Rank	Title	Platform	Sales	Title	Platform
1	Dragon Quest V: Tenkū no Hanayome	SNES	2,800,000	Street Fighter II	SNES
2	Final Fantasy V	SNES	2,000,000+	Final Fantasy V	SNES
3	Super Mario Kart	SNES	2,000,000+	Dragon Quest V	SNES
4	Street Fighter II	SNES	2,000,000+	Arang Jeonseol (Fatal Fury)	SNES
5	Romancing SaGa	SNES	< 1,170,000	Ranma ½: Hard Battle	SNES
6	Super Mario Land 2: 6-tsu no Kinka	GB	Unknown	—N/a	
7	Mario Paint	SNES	Unknown	—N/a	
8	Dragon Ball Z: Super Saiya Densetsu	SNES	< 730,000	—N/a	
9	Hoshi no Kirby (Kirby's Dream Land)	GB	Unknown	—N/a	
10	Super Famista (Super Batter Up)	SNES	Unknown	—N/a	

==== Europe ====
The following titles were the top three best-selling home video game releases of 1992 in Europe and the United Kingdom.

Rank	Europe			United Kingdom		
Rank	Title	Platform	Sales	Title	Platform	Sales
1	Sonic the Hedgehog 2	GEN	1,750,000+	Sonic the Hedgehog 2	GEN	1,000,000+
2	Road Rash II	GEN	Unknown	Street Fighter II	SNES	200,000
3	Mario Paint	SNES	Unknown	Street Fighter II	AMI	Unknown

In the United Kingdom, the following titles were the top-selling home video games of each month in 1992.

Month	Game consoles					Home computers		Ref
Month	Genesis	Super NES	Master System	NES	Game Boy	Amiga	ZX Spectrum	Ref
January	WWF WrestleMania (home computers)							
February	Robocod	—N/a	Sonic the Hedgehog	Super Mario Bros. 3	Super Mario Land	Grand Prix 1	Unknown	
March	QuackShot	—N/a	Asterix	Super Mario Bros. 3	Super Mario Land	1st Division Manager	Unknown	
April	Desert Strike	Unknown	Asterix	Super Mario Bros. 3	Super Mario Land	Project-X	Unknown	
May	Desert Strike	Unknown	Super Kick Off	Super Mario Bros. 3	Super Mario Land	John Madden	Unknown	
June	Desert Strike	Unknown	Champions of Europe	Rescue Rangers	Super Mario Land	Sensible Soccer	Italia '90	
July	Taz-Mania	Unknown	Wimbledon	Rescue Rangers	Super Mario Land	Sensible Soccer	Italia '90	
August	Olympic Gold	Unknown	Unknown	Unknown	Unknown	Sensible Soccer	Rainbow Islands	
September	Alien 3	WWF Super WrestleMania	Unknown	Unknown	Unknown	Sensible Soccer	Rainbow Islands	
October	Street Fighter II (SNES)							
November	Sonic the Hedgehog 2 (GEN)							
December	Sonic the Hedgehog 2 (GEN)							

==== United States ====
In the United States, the following titles were the top three best-selling home video games of 1992.

Rank	Title	Publisher	Genre	Sales	Platform	Ref
1	Sonic the Hedgehog 2	Sega	Platformer	2,000,000	GEN	
1	Street Fighter II	Capcom	Fighting	2,000,000	SNES	
3	The Legend of Zelda: A Link to the Past	Nintendo	Action-adventure	1,000,000	SNES	

The following titles were the best-selling home video games of each month for video game consoles (home consoles and handheld consoles) in 1992.

Month	NES	Super Nintendo	Sega Genesis	TurboDuo	Game Boy	Atari Lynx	Ref
June	Unknown	Final Fantasy II	Unknown	—N/a	Unknown	Unknown	
August	Yoshi	Street Fighter II	Evander Holyfield's Real Deal Boxing	—N/a	Super Mario Land	Batman Returns	
September	Yoshi	Turtles in Time	Evander Holyfield's Real Deal Boxing	—N/a	Super Mario Land	Batman Returns	
October	Tecmo Super Bowl	Street Fighter II	NHLPA Hockey '93	Cosmic Fantasy 2	Kirby's Dream Land	NFL Football	
November	Tecmo Super Bowl	Street Fighter II	John Madden Football '93	Air Zonk	Super Mario Land 2	NFL Football	
December	Tecmo Super Bowl	Street Fighter II	Sonic the Hedgehog 2	Air Zonk	Super Mario Land 2	Batman Returns	

The following titles were the top-selling personal computer games on the monthly PC Research charts in 1992, as reported by Electronic Games magazine.

Month	DOS games	DOS educational games	Amiga	Macintosh	CD-ROM	Ref
May	Hardball III	—N/a	—N/a	—N/a	—N/a	
June	Aces of the Pacific	Where in the World Is Carmen Sandiego?	—N/a	—N/a	—N/a	
July	Aces of the Pacific	Where in the World Is Carmen Sandiego?	—N/a	—N/a	—N/a	
August	Links	Where in the World Is Carmen Sandiego?	—N/a	—N/a	—N/a	
September	Falcon 3.0: Operation Fighting Tiger	Where in the World Is Carmen Sandiego?	—N/a	—N/a	—N/a	
October	King's Quest VI	Where in the World Is Carmen Sandiego?	Civilization	Prince of Persia	Battle Chess	

== Events ==
- January 1 – Atari Corporation drops support for the Atari 2600, Atari 8-bit computers, Atari 7800, and software for those systems.
- May 25 – FuncoLand founder David Pomije is named "Emerging Entrepreneur of the Year" by the TwinWest Chamber of Commerce.
- July 2 – FuncoLand's parent company Funco Inc. files a registration statement with the U.S. Securities and Exchange Commission for an initial public offering of one million shares of its common stock at $5 a share, with plans to use the proceeds from the sold shares to repay short-term debt and finance the opening of other FuncoLand locations.
- July 13 – The first Chicago-area FuncoLand location opens in Bloomingdale.
- August 12 – Funco's initial public offering, underwritten by Miller, Johnson & Kuehn Inc., is announced.
- September 22 – The first south suburban Chicago-area FuncoLand location opens in Orland Park.
- December – the Apple IIGS is discontinued.
- Atari Games Corp. v. Nintendo of America Inc.
- Lewis Galoob Toys, Inc. v. Nintendo of America, Inc.
- Sega v. Accolade
- Activision (as Mediagenic) files for Chapter 11 bankruptcy protection
- New companies: Wow Entertainment Inc. (Sega AM1), Humongous Entertainment, Halestorm

== Games released in 1992 ==
Release date	Title	Platform	Genre	Ref
January	The Addams Family	GB, NES	Action	
January	Art Alive!	GEN	Educational	
January	Back to the Future Part III	GEN	Adventure	
January	Beetlejuice	GB	Action	
January	Big Nose the Caveman	NES	Action	
January	Bucky O'Hare	NES	Action	
January	Cowboy Kid	NES	Action	
January	Darkwing Duck	PCE	Action	
January	Die Hard	NES	Action	
January	Dirty Larry: Renegade Cop	LYNX	Action	
January	Heavy Nova	GEN	Action	
January	Hydra	LYNX	Action	
January	Lynx Casino	LYNX	Simulation	
January	Mario Lemieux Hockey	GEN	Sports	
January	Monster in My Pocket	NES	Action	
January	Nightshade	NES	Action	
January	Pinball Jam	LYNX	Simulation	
January	Pit-Fighter	LYNX	Action	
January	Prince of Persia	GB	Action	
January	Rampart	NES	Adventure	
January	Rings of Power	GEN	RPG	
January	Sword Master	NES	Action-adventure	
January	Trouble Shooter	GEN	Action	
January	Wheel of Fortune Featuring Vanna White	NES	Game show	
January	The Games: Winter Challenge	GEN	Sports	
January 11	Super Adventure Island	SNES	Action	
January 14	Super Fantasy Zone	GEN	Shoot 'em up	
January 25	Dragon Ball Z: Legend of the Super Saiyan	SNES	RPG	
January 28	Romancing SaGa	SNES	RPG	
January 31	Football Frenzy	Arcade	Sports	
January 31	Soul Blazer	SNES	RPG	
February	Adventure Island	GB	Action	
February	Alisia Dragoon	GEN	Action	
February	Asteroids	GB	Action	
February	Boggle Plus	GB	Puzzle	
February	California Games	GEN	Sports	
February	F-15 Strike Eagle	NES	Simulation	
February	Godzilla 2: War of the Monsters	NES	Action	
February	Hudson Hawk	NES	Action	
February	InfoGenius Productivity Pak: Berlitz German Translator	GB	Educational	
February	M.C. Kids	NES	Action	
February	Paperboy	GEN	Action	
February	Q*bert	GB	Puzzle	
February	Sesame Street: Countdown	NES	Educational	
February	Super Smash TV	SNES	Action	
February	Star Trek: 25th Anniversary (NES)	NES	Action	
February	Star Trek: 25th Anniversary (GB)	GB	Action	
February	Super Spy Hunter	NES	Action	
February	Tiny Toon Adventures: Babs' Big Break	GB	Action	
February	Xenon 2: Megablast	GEN	Shoot 'em up	
February 14	Soccer Brawl	Arcade	Sports	
February 21	Football Frenzy	NEO	Sports	
February 21	Fortified Zone 2	GB	Action	
February 28	Contra III: The Alien Wars	SNES	Action	
March	The Addams Family	SNES	Action	
March	Baseball Heroes	LYNX	Sports	
March	Desert Strike	GEN	Action	
March	Fisher-Price: Firehouse Rescue	NES	Educational	
March	G.I. Joe: The Atlantis Factor	NES	Action	
March	Ghoul School	NES	Action	
March	InfoGenius Productivity Pak: Berlitz German & Japanese Translator	GB	Educational	
March	Kid Chameleon	GEN	Action	
March	Missile Command	GB	Action	
March	PGA Tour Golf	SNES	Sports	
March	Star Wars: The Empire Strikes Back	NES	Action	
March	The Terminator	GEN	Action	
March	Toki	LYNX	Action	
March	Ultima Underworld: The Stygian Abyss	DOS	RPG	
March	Where in Time Is Carmen Sandiego?	GEN	Educational	
March	Wizards & Warriors III: Kuros: Visions of Power	NES	Action	
March 13	Soccer Brawl	NEO	Sports	
March 16	Mutation Nation	Arcade	Action	
March 20	Shining Force	GEN	RPG	
March 23	Last Resort	Arcade	Shoot 'em up	
March 27	Arcana	SNES	RPG	
March 27	Rival Turf!	SNES	Action	
April	Crystal Mines II	LYNX	Action	
April	Devilish: The Next Possession	GEN	Action	
April	Double Dragon	GEN	Brawler	
April	Earnest Evans	GEN	Action	
April	George Foreman's KO Boxing	GG	Sports	
April	Hatris	NES	Puzzle	
April	Hook	NES	Action	
April	The Mutant Virus: Crisis in a Computer World	NES	Action	
April	Paperboy 2	GB, NES	Action	
April	Square Deal	GB	Simulation	
April	Super Skweek	LYNX	Action	
April	Toxic Crusaders	NES	Action	
April	Wizardry II: The Knight of Diamonds	NES	RPG	
April 5	Aerobiz	SNES	Simulation	
April 15	Baseball Stars 2	Arcade	Sports	
April 17	Mutation Nation	NEO	Action	
April 24	Last Resort	NEO	Shoot 'em up	
April 27	Kirby's Dream Land	GB	Action	
April 28	Baseball Stars 2	NEO	Sports	
April 30	Ninja Commando	Arcade	Shoot 'em up	
May	Ballistix	PCE	Sports	
May	NBA All-Star Challenge 2	GB	Sports	
May	Night Creatures	PCE	Action	
May	Rampart	LYNX	Action	
May	Roundball: 2 on 2 Challenge	NES	Sports	
May	Super Battletank	SNES	Simulation	
May	Turn and Burn: The F-14 Dogfight Simulator	GB	Action	
May 5	Wolfenstein 3D	DOS	FPS	
May 25	King of the Monsters 2	Arcade	Fighting	
May 29	Ninja Commando	NEO	Shoot 'em up	
June	Ferrari Grand Prix Challenge	NES	Sports	
June	High Stakes Gambling	GB	Simulation	
June	Indiana Jones and the Fate of Atlantis	DOS	Adventure	
June 15	Andro Dunos	Arcade	Shoot 'em up	
June 19	King of the Monsters 2	NEO	Fighting	
July 10	Soldier Blade	PCE		
July 29	Ecco the Dolphin			
August 27	Super Mario Kart		Racing (kart)	
September 1	Championship Manager	AMI, ATRST		
September 24	Art of Fighting	Arcade		
September 27 (JP)	Dragon Quest V			
October	Virtua Racing	Arcade	Racing	
October	Zool	AMI	Platformer	
October 8 (NA)	Mortal Kombat	Arcade	Fighting	
October 15	Night Trap	SCD		
October 21	Super Mario Land 2: 6 Golden Coins	GB		
October 23	Galaxy Fraulein Yuna	PCE	Adventure	
November	Star Control II			
November	Prince of Persia	SNES		
November 4	Stunt Island	DOS	Flight simulation	
November 21	Sonic the Hedgehog 2	GEN		
December	Dune II		RTS	
December 4 (JP)	Mega Man 5			
December 10	Fatal Fury 2	Arcade, NEO		
December 15 (US)	Mega Man 5			
Unknown	Alone in the Dark		survival horror	
Unknown	Flashback	AMI		

== See also ==
- 1992 in games
