= Midnight Raiders =

1994 video game

- Developer: Stargate Productions
- Publisher: Sega
- Director: Sam Nicholson
- Producer: Tony Cabalu
- Programmers: Jay Tautges; Kevin Ashley
- Writer: George Goldsmith
- Composer: Mars Lasar
- Platform: Sega CD
- Release: NA: October 1994; EU: March 1995; AU: April 1995
- Genre: Interactive movie
- Mode: Single-player

Midnight Raiders is a live-action, full-motion video game developed by American studio Stargate Productions and published by Sega for the Sega CD in North America in 1994 and PAL regions in 1995.

== Plot ==
A pair of Apache AH-64 helicopters, the Dragonfly and the Ladybug, is sent on "Operation Midnight", a covert mission to rescue a scientist who is being held hostage deep in enemy territory by the fictional Al Shakkur terrorist organization. Early in the mission, two allied trooper carriers are shot down, and the helicopter crews are left without their support. The team must infiltrate an enemy chemical weapons facility, extract the hostage, plant explosives, and escape.

== Gameplay ==
Midnight Raiders is an interactive film game in which the player shoots targets to continue the video and progress through the game.

== Development and release ==
Midnight Raiders was developed by Stargate Productions as part of Sega's "TruVideo" line of interactive film games for the Sega CD. It was directed by Sam Nicholson, who also worked on Tomcat Alley, Wing Nuts: Battle in the Sky, Surgical Strike, Bug Blasters: The Exterminators and Star Strike. These latter two Sega CD titles were produced by Stargate for publisher Sony Imagesoft. Both were cancelled during the console's life but eventually released by Good Deal Games. A version of Midnight Raiders was announced and advertised for the Sega 32X for a late 1994 release but it was cancelled.

== Reception ==
Reception

Review scores
Publication	Score
Game Players	58%
GamePro	3.875/5
Next Generation	2/5
Electronic Games	D
MAN!AC	64%
Mega Power	84%
Sega Pro	81%
VideoGames (US)	3/10
Video Games (DE)	9%

Critical reception for Midnight Raiders has been mixed and similar between all three region-specific releases the game saw. Next Generation reviewed the game, rating it two stars out of five, and stated that "It's a step up from Masked Rider Z, but frankly, that's not saying much." Other reviews included the Sega Pro which stated, "Not bad. The FMV movie is good stuff, although the simple shoot-'em-up action becomes repetitive after a while", rating it 81 out of 100. Retro Games Reviews gave it 4 stars out of 10, stating "Midnight Raiders is a weak attempt at the FMV genre due to its limited action, technical issues and poor controls."
