= Mega Power =

British video game magazine

- #12, August 1994
- Editor: Dave Perry
- Categories: Video game magazines
- Frequency: Monthly
- First issue: August 1993
- Final issue: July 1995
- Company: Paragon Publishing
- Country: United Kingdom
- Language: English
- ISSN: 0969-8434

Mega Power was launched following the success of Paragon Publishing's first publication, Sega Pro. Dave Perry along with a small editorial team helped the magazine become the first console publication to include a cover CD. The magazine was in circulation between August 1993 and July 1995.

== Cover mounted CDs ==
Issue 4, November 1993, included the first ever cover mounted demo playable on a Sega console, that being Thunderhawk. Game demo insert covers were provided, through the magazine, to use with the CD and an empty case.

Various other game demo CDs were released through 1993 and 1994 and they became a regular feature after May 1994. Other playable game demos CDs have included:-

Soulstar
Battlecorps
Sensible Soccer
FIFA International Soccer
Star Wars: Rebel Assault
Lawnmower Man
Mickey Mania
BC Racers
Lethal Enforcers II: Gunfighters

== See also ==
- Video game journalism
