= Wirehead =

Wirehead may refer to:

- Wirehead (science fiction), a fictional addict type
- Wirehead (video game), a Sega CD game based on the science fiction concept
- WireHead, a musical band formed in 2007 by Clive Edwards

== See also ==
- Carex cephalotes (wire-head sedge), a tussock-forming sedge
