= Heavy Nova =

Heavy Nova may refer to

- Heavy Nova (album), an album by Robert Palmer
- Heavy Nova (video game), a Sega CD video game
