= Wonder Dog =

Wonder Dog may refer to:

- Wonder Dog, the pet of Wendy and Marvin, two teenage characters of Super Friends
- Wonder Dog, musician Harry Thumann's side project, best known for the 1982 single "Ruff Mix"
- Wonder Dog (video game), a video game for the Mega-CD and Amiga
- Wonder Dog (Disney short), a 1950 short animation by the Walt Disney Company
- Rex the Wonder Dog, a fictional dog in the DC Comics universe
