= Live Wire! =

1999 maze video game

- Developer: The Code Monkeys
- Publisher: Sales Curve Interactive
- Platforms: PlayStation, Windows
- Release: 1999
- Genre: Maze
- Modes: Single-player, multiplayer

Live Wire! is a video game for the PlayStation and Microsoft Windows. It was released on April 10, 1999, by Sales Curve Interactive and was developed by The Code Monkeys. The game was only released in Europe.

The game is an Amidar-style game which sees four players compete against each other to claim tiles around the territory. To claim a tile, the player has to draw a line around a square, colouring each side. Tiles can also be stolen with power-ups. The level ends when the timer runs out or all the tiles have been captured. At the end of the level, the number of tiles collected are turned into points, with points also being allocated for stolen tiles and the amount of kills. The player with the most points wins the level.

The game's soundtrack was composed by Allister Whitehead.

== Reception ==
Reception

Review score
Publication	Score
AllGame	3/5

The game received mixed reviews. Absolute PlayStation rated the game 74%, praising the multiplayer mode but added that the game lacked addictive quality in comparison to other puzzle games. NowGamer gave the game a rating of 63.
