= E-Motion =

1990 video game

- North American Game Boy box art
- Developers: The Assembly Line; The Code Monkeys
- Publishers: NA: Accolade; EU: U.S. Gold
- Platforms: Amiga, Amstrad CPC, Atari ST, Commodore 64, MS-DOS, ZX Spectrum, Game Boy
- Release: 1990
- Genre: Puzzle
- Mode: Single-player

E-Motion (also known as Sphericule or The Game of Harmony) is a 1990 puzzle video game developed by The Assembly Line. It was available for Amiga, Amstrad CPC, Atari ST, Commodore 64, MS-DOS, ZX Spectrum, and Game Boy. The Spectrum and Game Boy versions were developed by The Code Monkeys.

== Gameplay ==
The player controls a round spacecraft, and must work to clear all globes from the screen within a time limit. The playing field wraps around at the edges, so a globe or the ship traveling off the left edge (for example) will re-appear on the right. Globes come in three different colors, and those of the same color will disappear when they collide, whereas differing-colored globes will produce small pods, of the third color. Pods can be collected for more energy, but if they are not picked up quickly, they will turn into globes.

There are 50 levels of increasing difficulty. On some levels, elastic bands connect certain globes, or even attach the player's ship to one or more globes. Destroying a globe will remove any elastic band attached to it. In other areas, barriers block the movement of the player and the globes. On difficulty settings above "easy", the globes are somewhat volatile. If they are not cleared within a certain time of their appearance, they will explode and damage the player's ship. If the ship loses enough energy, it is destroyed.

There are two kinds of bonus levels, both containing only pods, not full-sized spheres. One bonus level has yellow and blue pods, both of which can be collected, but only blue pods earn points. Collecting a blue pod causes a yellow pod to turn blue. Another bonus level has blue and red pods. Collecting a blue pod earns points, while collecting a red pod ends the bonus level immediately. There are also hidden bonuses available during the game; for example, completing a level by not rotating right earns extra bonus points.

The player's spaceship is operated by polar control, as in Spacewar! or Asteroids: moving the joystick left or right rotates the ship, and pressing the Fire button makes it thrust in whatever direction it is facing. The game's distinguishing feature is its realistic model of kinetics. Objects colliding with each other change their speed and direction in a realistic manner, and the elastic bands affect movement in a realistic fashion as well.

The "E" in E-Motion stands for Albert Einstein, and he appears in cover art and advertisements. There is a sequel, Vaxine, a more complex 3D shooting game which featured a similar ray traced graphical style to E-Motion.

== Reception ==
Reception

Award
Publication	Award
Amstrad Action	Mastergame

The game was ranked the 30th best game of all time by Amiga Power in 1991.

== Screenshots ==
MS-DOS version

ZX Spectrum title screen

Use of shapes instead of colours on the ZX Spectrum avoid color clash
