= F1 Exhaust Note =

1991 video game

- Japanese arcade flyer
- Developer: Sega
- Publisher: Sega
- Producer: Yu Suzuki
- Composer: Takayuki Nakamura
- Platform: Arcade
- Release: JP: November 1991; NA/EU: 1991
- Genre: Racing
- Arcade system: Sega System 32

F1 Exhaust Note is a two-player racing game released for arcades in 1991, modeled on Formula One racing. The game has a standard dual racing cabinet setup. Each player station has a 25-inch monitor, steering controls, shift controls, pedals, and a decorative seat. The sound originates from the back of the seat giving the player surround sound effect. The game ran on the Sega System 32 arcade hardware.

Original F1 Exhaust Note cabinet, 1991

== Reception ==
In Japan, Game Machine listed F1 Exhaust Note on their 1 January 1992 issue as being the second most-successful upright arcade unit of the month. It went on to be the highest-grossing dedicated arcade cabinet of 1992 in Japan, and the year's second highest-grossing arcade title after Street Fighter II. In the United States, the RePlay arcade charts listed F1 Exhaust Note as the top-grossing new video game from March to April 1992.

In Play Meter magazine, Jim Overman gave the game a rating of 94% and a "gut feeling" score of 10 out of 10.

== F1 Super Lap ==
In 1993, Sega released an FIA/FOCA licensed revision of F1 Exhaust Note titled F1 Super Lap, featuring cars from the 1992 Formula One World Championship. Other changes included an 'overtake' button, graphical improvements and the ability to link up to four cabinets for a maximum of 8 players.

=== Cars ===
Each player can select one of three cars, with the choices varying depending on the player number.

- Player 1 / 5: Williams FW14B, Lotus 107, Minardi M192
- Player 2 / 6: McLaren MP4/7A, Ligier JS37, Scuderia Italia Dallara 192
- Player 3 / 7: Benetton B192, Tyrrell 020B, Venturi Larrousse LC92
- Player 4 / 8: Ferrari F92A, Footwork FA13, Jordan 192
