= Baseball Heroes =

1992 video game

- Cover art in all regions
- Developer(s): Atari Corporation
- Publisher(s): Atari Corporation
- Producer(s): Juliana Wade
- Designer(s): Steve DeFrisco
- Programmer(s): Steve DeFrisco
- Artist(s): Bob Pauley
- Platform(s): Atari Lynx
- Release: NA: 1992; EU: 1992
- Genre(s): Sports
- Mode(s): Single-player, multiplayer

Baseball Heroes is a 1992 baseball video game developed and published by Atari Corporation in North America and Europe exclusively for the Atari Lynx.

== Gameplay ==
Gameplay screenshot.

Baseball Heroes is a baseball game. It supported up to 2 players with the Atari ComLynx. It had 4 different games included.

== Development and release ==
Baseball Heroes was developed for the Atari Lynx. It released in 1992. It came in a standard box. There was no option to save and there was only mono sound.

== Reception ==
Reception

Review scores
Publication	Score
IGN	8.0 / 10
Digital Press	6 / 10
Joypad	82%
Joystick	82%
Lynx User	6 / 10
Power Play	60%
Video Games	67%
VideoGames & Computer Entertainment	4 / 10

Robert A. Jung reviewed the game which was published on IGN. In his final verdict he wrote "Baseball Heroes is a very good translation of the sport, though not a perfect game. It has a few rough spots that will try some people, but for the most part this is a quality title and a showcase game for the Lynx." Giving it a final score of 8 out of 10.
