= Garfield (video game) =

2004 video game

- European Windows box art
- Developer: The Code Monkeys
- Publisher: Hip Games
- Engine: RenderWare
- Platforms: PlayStation 2, Microsoft Windows
- Release: PlayStation 2: EU: November 19, 2004; Microsoft Windows: EU: November 26, 2004; NA: May 17, 2005
- Mode: Single-player

Garfield is a 2004 video game based on the Garfield comic strip, developed by The Code Monkeys and published by Hip Games. It was released for PlayStation 2 and Windows in November 2004 in Europe, and on May 17, 2005, in North America for Windows only. It was the first 3D Garfield video game.

== Gameplay ==
The player (playing as Garfield) must clean the house and put everything in the right place before Jon gets home or he will put Garfield on a diet as punishment. Garfield uses the vacuum cleaner to suck out-of-place objects into the vacuum or fix paintings or pictures, and put out of place objects back in the right place by blowing them out. The game has a time limit of 8 and a half hours; if the player has not cleaned the house in time, a cutscene plays, showing Jon finding his house in ruins and the game going back to the main menu.

There are 15 rooms in the game. The player must clean these rooms to collect keys to open locked rooms, with color coded keys corresponding to their respective door. Various objects in the rooms, such as wall ornaments and basketballs, can be interacted with using the vacuum cleaner.

The player can only hold three items, and must go to storage boxes to store items they do not need at the moment. Player can also save the game at these storage boxes. There are also various mini games that the player can play, including a block matching game similar to Columns, a jigsaw puzzle that uses pieces found in the house, and a race with Nermal.

There are different keys to obtain after cleaning each room: cleaning the Den grants access to Jon's bedroom, while cleaning the Utility Room grants access to the Small Bedroom.

== Reception ==
The Garfield game received poor ratings, Superpanda of Jeuxvideo.com gave it a 5 out of 10, and Aymeric of jeuxvideopc.com (a PC section of Jeuxvideo.com) heavily criticized the game with a 0 out of 10 score. PS2 UK Magazine gave it a 2/10. 7Wolf Magazine rated the game 4.8 out of 10. Major points of criticism include boring gameplay, Odie constantly attacking the player, poor graphics, bad game engine physics, and sluggish controls.
