= Racing Aces =

1993 video game

- Developer(s): Hammond & Leyland
- Publisher(s): Sega
- Designer(s): Gregory D. Hammond
- Programmer(s): Robert Leyland
- Composer(s): Eric Hammond
- Platform(s): Sega CD
- Release: NA: 1993
- Genre(s): Flight simulator Shoot 'em up
- Mode(s): Single-player

Racing Aces is a 1993 video game for the Sega CD that was developed by American company Hammond & Leyland and published by Sega. It was released exclusively in North America. There is a selection of 30 different playable characters; all of them are parodies of 20th century celebrities.

== Gameplay ==
After the end of the Cold War, a new sport has merged involving surplus fighter planes from World War I in addition to World War II and the rest of the 20th century. Players must shoot at their opponents in addition to outracing them in order to win each race in a typical season. Four different classes of airplane use unique control methods; meaning that World War I fighter planes are easier to use than modern jet planes. Three of the planes available from the beginning of the game are the Fokker Dr.I, the P-38 Lightning and the ever-popular F-16 Fighting Falcon. Three fighter types, World War I and World War II piston driven, and modern day jets, are presented in the packaging art (at right) created for Sega of America by Bay area free lance illustrator Marc Ericksen.

All courses are done using 3D computer graphics and the view is always from behind the aircraft. A mountainous terrain allows player to clear see the poles that act as racing checkpoints. Players can buy better airplanes from Bob's Pro Shop; which is operated by a woman with the nickname of "Bob". A black market also exists that gives players a selection of superior weaponry that is considerably more expensive than buying from the pro shop.

== Reception ==
GamePro praised the authentic controls and sound effects of the planes, commenting that "Each of the classic planes, ranging from the beginner World War I Fokkers to the intermediate P-38s to the advanced jets, performs like the real McCoy."
