= The Games: Winter Challenge =

1991 video game

Winter Challenge
- Genesis box art
- Developer: MindSpan
- Publisher: Accolade
- Designers: Jeff Sember; Mike Benna
- Platforms: MS-DOS, Genesis
- Release: 1991: MS-DOS; 1992: Genesis
- Genre: Sports
- Modes: Single-player, multiplayer

The Games: Winter Challenge is a sports video game developed by Canadian developer MindSpan and published by Accolade for MS-DOS compatible operating systems in 1991 and as Winter Challenge for the Sega Genesis/Mega Drive in Europe in 1991 and the United States in 1992. The game portrays eight winter sports events that are competed in during the Winter Olympics. The game is unlicensed and not endorsed by the International Olympic Committee or similar organisations. Upon release, Winter Challenge received praise from several publications, with attention directed to the game's variety of events and visual presentation, with some criticism towards the inconsistency and difficulty of events. A sequel to the game based on the Summer Olympics, The Games: Summer Challenge, was released by Accolade in 1992.

== Gameplay ==
A screenshot of gameplay in Winter Challenge, depicting the luge event.

Winter Challenge features two modes. In Tournament mode, the player can create a competitor and participate with up to ten players, with selectable names, countries and user pictures. Once the players are selected, the game shows an opening ceremony for the tournament and then takes the player to a tournament screen where they can see their icons for the events, as well as four buttons that shows their current standings, starts a new tournament, allows the entering of a password to return to an existing tournament, or return to the main menu. In this mode, computer-generated opponents have a skill level, from 'Amateur' to 'Professional' and 'World Class', affecting their speed and stamina in events. In Training mode, the player can participate in a single event as one player. Several events are simplified for the training mode to allow error, such as being able to miss flags in the giant slalom. Once completed, the player can play again, return to the main menu, or watch an instant replay of their performance.

=== Events ===
Winter Challenge features eight events. Most events use the directional pad for steering, and buttons for performing certain functions like shooting, running, braking, or pushing off. Button mashing is necessary for some events, with others focused on timing and accuracy. The ski jump is scored by distance, the biathlon by time and shooting accuracy, and all other events are scored by time. A list of the events are provided below:

Luge	Players navigate turns in a downhill luge course in the fastest time possible, gaining speed by using the outside curves, whilst avoiding losing control on the course.
Downhill skiing	Players guide their skier between all the flagged gates in the fastest possible time to reach the end of a downhill course.
Cross-country skiing	Players navigate a long-distance course, and are required to manage an energy meter to maintain the optimum speed.
Bobsled	Players navigate a narrower course in a bobsled, similar to the luge event.
Speed skating	Players complete three laps of a circuit, starting to a gun and being required to press keys as quickly as possible to maintain speed.
Giant slalom	Players knock over as many flags as possible on a downhill course. The player relies on a course overview map to locate the flags. Players can 'tuck' their position to increase speed, at the cost of motion.
Biathlon	A mixture of the cross-country mode and shooting, players ski to five targets across a course and aim with their rifle. Inaccurate shots lead to a time penalty.
Ski jump	Players time a downhill jump, managing mid-air wind resistance to reach the greatest distance on the jump. Players need to align their landing to avoid wiping out.

== Reception ==
Reception

Review scores
Publication	Score	
Publication	DOS	Sega Genesis
ACE	5/5	
Computer Game Review	79%	
Electronic Gaming Monthly	90%	
Games-X	4/5	
GameZone		93%
VideoGames & Computer Entertainment	7/10	
Mean Machines		85%
Mega Zone		78%
Sega Force		80%
Sega Pro		79%

Winter Challenge received positive reviews from gaming publications, with many critics praising the variety and appeal of the game's different activities. Describing the title as a "multi-venued game" that imitated a "full-scale Olympic competition", Computer Gaming World praised the game as "more exciting" than its predecessors and highlighted the balance of "fast-paced" and "leisurely" game modes. However, some critics noted that the game was inconsistent in its execution. Computer Game Review observed that "the cross country events are too long and rather dull", and "competing against other than amateur competition is extremely tough." Similarly, whilst Mean Machines found the game "varied and engrossing", the game had an "inconsistent quality, finding some events "easy to finish", and remarking that "the multi-player mode is where the game is best appreciated."

Several reviewers praised the game's graphics and use of perspective to convey the action in the game. Sega Pro noted the rear view perspective "works successfully and gives a real impression of movement and perspective." Similarly, ACE praised the perspective for providing a "good view of the action as well as an excellent first-person impression of speed." Game Zone highlighted the "realistic" reflections and shadows, and noted the graphics were animated "well". GamePro praised the developers for "doing an excellent job of combining first-person perspective play with realistically-scaling background graphics." However, Sega Force critiqued the "limited field of vision" for some events, including the slalom, remarking that "degrees of white are difficult to distinguish."
