= The Code Monkeys =

British video game developer

The Code Monkeys Limited
- Company type: Private
- Industry: Video games
- Founded: 1 February 1988; 37 years ago
- Founders: Colin Hogg; Mark Kirkby; Elliot Gay
- Defunct: 14 February 2011
- Fate: Dissolved
- Headquarters: Dewsbury, England
- Key people: Colin Hogg; Mark Kirkby; Elliot Gay; Janet Smith

The Code Monkeys Limited was a British video game developer based in Dewsbury, England, and founded in February 1988 by Colin Hogg, Mark Kirkby and Elliot Gay. It was known for porting video games to various platforms. In February 2011, shareholders of the company decided to wind down the company, which was effective two weeks later.

== History ==
The Code Monkeys was founded by Colin Hogg and Mark Kirkby on 1 February 1988. The company went on to develop games for home computers as far back as the ZX81 and video game consoles such as the Mega Drive and the original PlayStation. On the PlayStation and the PlayStation 2, they developed budget interactive titles taken from Dingo Pictures' animated films, which were published first by Midas and then by Phoenix Games. In January 2010 the company scaled back its development team because of "production needs and predictions" for the year ahead. On 1 February 2011, shareholders of The Code Monkeys voted to cease trading, a move that was effective on 14 February 2011.

== Games ==
- Show Jumping (1986) (ZX Spectrum)
- The Games: Summer Edition (1988) (Amiga, Atari ST)
- The Games: Winter Edition (1988) (Atari ST)
- NorthStar (1988) (Atari ST)
- Mean Streets (1989-90) (Commodore 64, Amiga, Atari ST)
- Gunboat (1990-92) (Amstrad CPC, ZX Spectrum, TurboGrafx-16)
- The Game of Harmony (1990-91) (Commodore 64, Amstrad CPC, ZX Spectrum, Game Boy)
- Crime Wave (1990) (Amiga, Atari ST)
- Turrican (1991) (Mega Drive, TurboGrafx-16, Game Boy)
- Onslaught (1991) (Mega Drive)
- Universal Soldier (1992) (Mega Drive, Game Boy)
- Asteroids (1992) (Game Boy)
- Missile Command (1992-99) (Game Boy, Game Boy Color)
- Centipede (1992) (Game Boy)
- Road Rash (1993) (Game Boy)
- Tomcat Alley (1994) (Mega-CD)
- Surgical Strike (1995) (Mega-CD, 32X)
- Wirehead (1995) (Mega-CD)
- Live Wire! (1999) (PlayStation, Windows)
- Goldie (2000) (PlayStation)
- Moses Prince of Egypt (2000) (PlayStation)
- Nice Cats (2000) (PlayStation)
- The Dalmatians (2000) (PlayStation)
- Force 21 (2000) (Game Boy Color)
- Anastasia (2001) (PlayStation)
- Goofy's Fun House (2001) (PlayStation)
- Lion and the King (2001) (PlayStation)
- Lord of the Jungle (2001) (PlayStation)
- The Sword of Camelot (2001) (PlayStation)
- Worms World Party (2001) (PlayStation)
- Hunchback of Notredame (2002) (PlayStation)
- Legend of Pocahontas (2002) (PlayStation)
- Shrek: Treasure Hunt (2002) (PlayStation)
- The Simpsons Skateboarding (2002) (PlayStation 2)
- Animal Football (2003) (PlayStation)
- Atlantis the Lost Continent (2003) (PlayStation)
- Dalmatians 2 (2003) (PlayStation)
- Detective Mouse (2003) (PlayStation)
- Dinosaurs (2003) (PlayStation)
- Herkules (2003) (PlayStation)
- Legend of Mulan (2003) (PlayStation)
- Lion and the King 2 (2003) (PlayStation)
- Toys (2003) (PlayStation)
- Winky the Little Bear (2003) (PlayStation)
- Animal Soccer World (2004) (PlayStation 2)
- CT Special Forces 3: Bioterror (2004) (PlayStation)
- Countryside Bears (2004) (PlayStation 2)
- Dalmatians 3 (2004) (PlayStation 2)
- Dinosaur Adventure (2004) (PlayStation 2)
- Empire of Atlantis (2004) (PlayStation 2)
- Legend of Herkules (2004) (PlayStation 2)
- Mighty Mulan (2004) (PlayStation 2)
- Sitting Ducks (2004) (PlayStation)
- Son of the Lion King (2004) (PlayStation 2)
- Superbike Masters (2004) (PlayStation)
- The Mouse Police (2004) (PlayStation 2)
- The Toys Room (2004) (PlayStation 2)
- Garfield (2004) (PlayStation 2, Windows)
- Cartoon Kingdom (2006) (PlayStation 2)
- Kiddies Party Pack (2006) (PlayStation 2)
- Jump: Free Running (2007) (J2ME)
- Alan Hansen's Sports Challenge (2007) (PlayStation 2)
- King of Clubs (2007) (PlayStation 2)
- Castlevania: Aria of Sorrow (2008) (J2ME)
- International Athletics (2008) (Nintendo DS)
- 8BallAllstars (2009) (Nintendo DS)
- Triple Shot Sports (2009-10) (iOS, Wii)
- Casper's Scare School: Spooky Sports Day (2010) (Wii, DS)
- Triple Throwing Sports (2010) (Wii)
- Triple Jumping Sports (2010) (Wii)
- Triple Running Sports (2010) (Wii)
- Manic Monkey Mayhem (2010-12) (PlayStation Portable, PlayStation 3, Wii, PlayStation Vita)
