= Black Hole Assault =

1992 video game

- North American Sega CD box art
- Developer: Micronet
- Publishers: NA: Bignet USA; JP: Micronet; PAL: Sega
- Platforms: Sega CD, PC Engine CD
- Release: Sega CD: JP: October 23, 1992; NA: November 1992; EU: April 2, 1993; PC Engine CD: JP: July 23, 1993
- Genre: Fighting
- Modes: Single-player, multiplayer

Black Hole Assault (Note: Japanese: ブラックホール アサルト) is a 1992 fighting video game developed and published by Micronet for the Sega CD. It was released in Japan by Micronet, in North America by Bignet USA (Micronet's North American division) as a launch title for the system and in PAL territories by Sega. The game is the sequel to Micronet's Heavy Nova.

== Story ==
It has been forty years since Humans fought the Akirovians, a race of aliens who had previously aided Earth's dying atmosphere as well as Human technology only to enslave humanity. Since then, Humans have ventured deep into space in order to gather more resources from the planets for Earth's still-threatened natural resources. Several resource ships sent out to acquire these minerals, but many of them are destroyed under mysterious circumstances.

Captain Graine aboard the Defcon-2 realizes the destruction of each ship is too calculated and, upon further investigation of the issue, discovers the accidents are actually attacks from the Akirovians. The Akirovians had previously set-up outposts on each planet equipped with their own giant robots. Graine, sided by Earth Command, initiates a counter-attack using Cybernetic Anthropomorphized Machines (C.A.M.'s), military issue Heavy D.O.L.L.'s, to combat the Akirovians.

== Gameplay ==
In single-player mode, players fight eight different Akirovian giant robots in eight levels spanning throughout the Solar System using one of two C.A.M.'s, either the Cyquest or the Orion. Each battle between the player and enemy takes place over one round, and the player only has five continues should they lose a single match. Each battle is timed, and once the timer runs out the player's C.A.M. would self-destruct.

The combat is similar to Heavy Nova: the player's C.A.M. has an energy level that depletes with every sustained hit. However, the energy level rapidly grows back once the player stops moving and energy level depletion would not result in an inability to move. However, using the C.A.M.'s special attacks or abilities drains the robot's energy level. A unique feature to the game's combat is the Field Trap, an option that allows the player and enemy to be affected by atmospheric conditions in each level; elements such as gravity, fire and ice, when the Field Trap option is on, can slow or stall player/enemy movement.

The story of Black Hole Assault is told through animated cutscenes, complete with voice acting and the game's main score/final boss theme, mostly to introduce new enemies and their attacks.

== Reception ==
Reception

Review score
Publication	Score
Mega	14%

The game received harsh criticism, with Mega saying it was "pure unadulterated tedium".
