= The Third World War (video game) =

1993 video game

- Developer: Micronet
- Publishers: JP: Micronet; NA: Extreme
- Platform: Sega Mega-CD
- Release: JP: November 26, 1993; NA: 1994
- Genres: Simulation, Strategy
- Mode: Single-player

The Third World War, released in Japan as The IIIrd World War (Note: (ザ・サード ワールド ウォー)), is a 1993 turn-based strategy video game developed by Micronet for the Mega-CD. A Sega Genesis/Mega Drive version was planned, but never released. The objective of the game is to defeat an opponent computer player in order to prevent starting a Third World War.

== Gameplay ==
Players are tasked with competing against a computer player as a nation of their choosing in the past (i.e. during the Cold War), present-day, or future. Each nation has its own strengths and weaknesses, and the player is given a limited number of terms to develop their nation's society, technology, and military power.

Players are able to choose from one of 16 nations to lead: The United States of America, Russia, Japan, Germany, China, France, the United Kingdom, India, Brazil, Canada, Australia, Iraq, Israel, Saudi Arabia, South Africa, or Libya. Several other areas in the map are gray in most game options and are not selectable to control, but are conquerable (examples would include Cuba, Vietnam, Mexico, and Ethiopia).

Victory is achieved in one of two ways: a military victory or an economic victory. To achieve military victory, players must conquer 51 different nations. Once the 51st location is conquered, a small speech by the chosen country's leader will commence.

== Reception ==
Reception

Review score
Publication	Score
Electronic Gaming Monthly	6/10, 7/10, 5/10, 5/10, 5/10

Entertainment Weekly gave the game a C and wrote that "Assuming the leadership of any one of 16 countries, players negotiate treaties, deploy armed forces, and shore up their economies in this complex, menu-driven brain strainer. But while it's hard to dislike any game that includes options like 'aid terrorism' and 'manipulate media,' Third World War is a bit dull-by the time the shooting starts, you'll probably have tuned in CNN to catch the real thing."

== See also ==
- Risk; its versions for Commodore 64 and Macintosh computers share several similarities to this game.
