= Mighty Morphin Power Rangers (Sega CD video game) =

1994 video game

- North American cover art
- Developer: Orion Technologies
- Publisher: Sega
- Producer: Tony Van
- Designer: Tony Van
- Programmer: Chuck Batson
- Artists: Rolf Weber; Jenny Martin
- Composer: Ron Wasserman
- Platform: Sega CD
- Release: NA: 1994; EU: March 1995
- Genre: Interactive movie
- Mode: Single-player

Mighty Morphin Power Rangers is a video game for the Sega CD console. It was produced by Sega TruVideo and released by Sega in North America in 1994 and then Europe a year later. The game consists mostly of footage from nine episodes of the Mighty Morphin Power Rangers TV series, which featured footage from Kyōryū Sentai Zyuranger.

== Gameplay ==
Gameplay requires the player to press certain buttons at precise moments throughout the game as they appear on screen. If the player misses, the health meter will drop. However, there are points in the game where the player can press a button unprompted for extra points. At the end of each level, the player's progress is tallied. The points earned will be used to refill the player's health meter and can even score an extra life. Footage from episodes of the television series was used for the game. This footage was heavily cut down for disc space and level length. As a result, the five-part "Green With Evil" serial was turned into four small segments for the game.

The game has a total of nine levels. In easy mode, only levels one through five are playable. With levels six and seven being playable in normal mode and levels eight and nine being playable in hard mode.

== Reception ==
In the United States, it was the top-selling Sega CD game in December 1994.

In their review, GamePro remarked that the use of actual Power Rangers footage would make it appeal to fans of the show, but that the quick time event gameplay is overly simplistic and forces the player to choose between enjoying the footage and keeping an eye on the on-screen directions which they must follow to keep advancing. The four reviewers of Electronic Gaming Monthly gave it a unanimous score of four out of ten, panning the game for its poor video quality and limited interactivity.
