= Wonder Dog (video game) =

1992 video game

- Box art (US)
- Developer: Core Design
- Publishers: JVC Musical Industries; Victor Musical Industries (JP)
- Platforms: Sega CD, Amiga
- Release: JP: September 25, 1992; NA: December 1992; EU: 1993; UK: January 1994
- Genre: Platform
- Mode: Single-player

Wonder Dog is a side-scrolling platform game developed by Core Design and released by JVC Musical Industries for the Sega CD in 1992. It is one of the first games developed for the system. The game features Wonder Dog, a mascot for Victor and the Wondermega during the early 1990s.

In 1993, Core Design released a port of the game for the Amiga in Europe as part of a deal with JVC that saw them distributing Wolfchild on the Sega Genesis and Sega CD.

== Plot ==
The peaceful dog-ruled planet K-9 finds itself under attack by the evil Pitbully space armada. In a last-ditch effort to save his world, Dr. Kibble fast tracks the Wonder Dog project, an experiment to create a superpowered dog. Running out of time, he tests the serum on his newborn son and sends him to Earth with a special outfit called the Wonder Suit. His son crash lands on the planet and immediately befriends a boy. However, the two are separated as the boy's father will not let him keep the dog. The dog then returns to the ship, dons the Wonder Suit and becomes Wonder Dog, who must save K-9 from the Pitbullies' invasion.

== Gameplay ==
The game is a platformer with controls similar to the Super Mario Bros. games. The player controls Wonder Dog to guide him through seven stages: Bunny Hop Meadow, Dogsville, Scrapyard, Loony Moon, Planet Weird, Planet Foggia and Planet K-9 (known as "Planet Kninus" in the Amiga version). Wonder Dog moves when the "Left" and "Right" buttons on the D-pad are pressed. Holding the "B" Button while pressing "Left" and "Right" allows him to run. Pressing the "C" Button makes him jump, and he can also jump on the heads of enemies to defeat them. He can jump farther and higher while running. Holding the "C" Button in midair allows Wonder Dog to use his ears to glide. He can perform the Spin Dig, which digs into certain terrains, when the "Down" and "C" Buttons are pressed and held. By pressing the "A" Button, Wonder Dog can shoot stars for a ranged attack. The speed, distance, and trajectory of the stars fired depends on the Star Power gauge, which is increased by firing multiple stars in quick succession or by holding the fire button.

If Wonder Dog is hit by an enemy, he loses a hit point. He has three in total, which can be replenished by finding a Wings item. If he loses all of his hit points, he loses a life. Lives are limited but can be found throughout the game or when 100 Bones are collected. The game ends when the player runs out of lives but can be continued from the start of the current stage. Stages are mostly linear. However, each stage has several hidden areas containing bonus items, as well as two hidden stages (Underground and Moon Mines). Many stages contain invisible platforms, which can be revealed by finding a Smiley item.

== Development ==
In November 1991, Victor Musical Industries saw potential in the rise of 16-bit gaming and CD-ROM-based home consoles, and partnered with Sega to release the Wondermega, a console that combined the Sega Genesis and Sega CD and included extra features like with high-quality audio, MIDI output and microphone inputs. Various characters were created as candidates for mascots for their new console, but Satoshi Honda, General Manager of Victor's New Media Division at the time, selected a dog as the mascot, as the company's original logo had a dog mascot, Nipper. Since they were releasing the Wondermega, Victor needed a game in order to help sell the console as well, so they decided to create a family-friendly product that would appeal to a wide range of ages. They consulted Core Design for their assistance with developing the game, entitled Wonder Dog. Core Design already had quite a history, working on titles for computers like Rick Dangerous and Impossamole, so they were well-versed with creating platformers. The game was programmed by Chris Long, John Kirkland, Ged Keaveney and Robert Toone, play-tested by Mark Price and Darren Price, directed by Toshiyuki Nagai and Takeshi Minagawa, produced by Jeremy Heath-Smith and Isamu Senda, and executive produced by Honda, with graphics by Lee Pullen, Robert Churchill and Simon Phipps, and music and sound effects by Martin Iveson and Stewart Perkins. One of the game's sound effects was a clip of Homer Simpson's "D'oh!" from The Simpsons, used for some enemies when defeated. The game's opening cutscene was animated by Billy Allison and programmed by Sean Dunlevy. The game was originally set to be released in June 1992, but was moved to September 25 of that year. Telephone cards, stuffed toys, UFO catcher toys, stickers and a manga based on the game and a sequel were being planned at the time. The character of Wonder Dog also appeared in a short film contained in some VHS head cleaning videocassettes.

The Amiga version was programmed by Daniel Scott and Jason Gosling and produced by Jeremy Heath-Smith, with graphics by Adrian Mannion and Robert Churchill and music and sound effects by Martin Iveson. According to Scott, Chuck Rock II: Son of Chuck, another Core Design game for the Sega CD, was based on the same engine as Wonder Dog. He then started work on Chuck Rock II for the Amiga, after which the developers decided to convert Wonder Dog to the console as well. The game was distributed in Germany by Bomico and in Italy by Leader.

== Reception ==
Reception

Review scores
Publication	Score
Beep! MegaDrive	50%
Hippon Super!	50%
Famitsu	55%
Sega Pro	90%
GamePro	100%
Mega Drive Advanced Gaming	88%
Computer and Video Games	84/82%

Wonder Dog received positive reviews upon release, being praised for its visuals and soundtrack. Magazines such as Sega Pro, GamePro, Mega Drive Advanced Gaming and Computer and Video Games scored the game a 90%, 100%, 88% and 84%, respectively. Some magazines of the time, such as Beep! MegaDrive, Hippon Super and Famitsu, seemed to take offence to its manufactured origins as a product for order, with scores ranging from 50% to 60%. However, the game was not enough to make the Wondermega a success. This would be JVC's only attempt to breach the console market, though the console did get a second release as the JVC X'Eye in North America in 1994. This did not stop Core Design from supporting the Sega CD for years with games like Battlecorps and Soulstar, and they would later achieve success with Tomb Raider in 1996.

Doug Jackson of Sega-16 reviewed the game, giving it a score of 5 out of 10, and stating, "The bottom line for Wonder Dog is that it's just an average game that's too easy, lacks variety, has a poor story, and doesn't make any decent use of the CD's added capabilities. Ultimately, it just feels like a cash-in for the system." Stephen Barbato reviewed the game, stating, "Wonder Dog is a somewhat incoherent game, full of ideas that don't feel properly connected, but this unpredictability and unorthodox approach also gives it a distinct identity that makes getting to the next stage more rewarding when compared to other mascot platformers of the time. For those who never had a chance to be exposed to European-style platformers, it's a potentially good place to start due to its low difficulty and straightforward level design. It's by no means a must-play game in the genre, but it's an uncommon blending of platforming design philosophies from two different regions with a bit of interesting history behind it, making it worthy of recognition nonetheless."

Magazine reviews for the Amiga version ranged from 84% in The One to 31% in CU Amiga.
