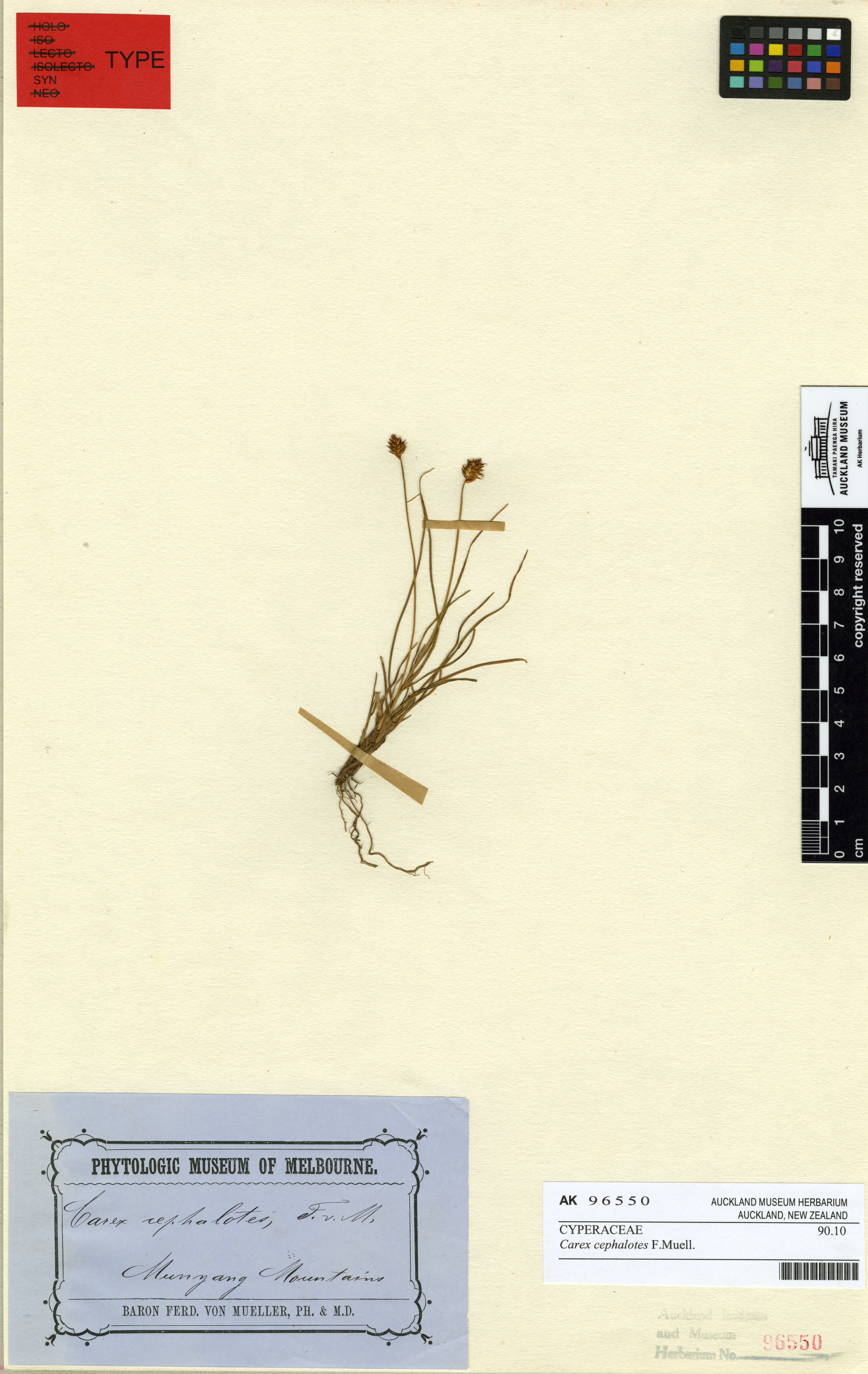

Scientific classification
- Kingdom: Plantae
- Clade: Tracheophytes
- Clade: Angiosperms
- Clade: Monocots
- Clade: Commelinids
- Order: Poales
- Family: Cyperaceae
- Genus: Carex
- Species: C. cephalotes

Binomial name
- Carex cephalotes F.Muell.

= Carex cephalotes =

Species of plant

Carex cephalotes, also known as wire-head sedge, is a tussock-forming species of perennial sedge in the family Cyperaceae. It is native to south eastern Australia and New Zealand.

== Description ==
The sedge has a densely tufted appearance with many shoots appearing along a short rhizome. It has smooth, erect, cylindrically tapering culms that are typically 5 to 20 cm (2.0 to 7.9 in) in length but can reach 30 cm (12 in) long and are 0.5 to 1.2 mm (0.020 to 0.047 in) in diameter. The leaves are often shorter than the culms and have a width of 0.2–1.2 mm (0.0079–0.0472 in) and have yellow to brown coloured sheaths. It flowers between October and march and produces erect Inflorescences that are 0.5–1.5 cm (0.20–0.59 in) in length and have a single spike. The lowest whorl of specialised leaves beneath the inlforecence or involucral bracts is a good deal shorter than the inflorescence itself.

== Taxonomy ==
The species was first formally described by the Australian botanist Ferdinand von Mueller in 1855 as a part of the work Definitions of Rare or Hitherto Undescribed Australian Plants. The only synonym is Carex pyrenaica var. cephalotes.

== Distribution ==
It is found in temperate areas of south eastern Australia from New South Wales down to Tasmania, as well as both the North Island and South Island of New Zealand. In New South Wales it has a limited distribution in area of alpine herbfields around Mount Kosciuszko. It is only found in small area in southern Victoria, where it is considered critically endangered, in the Highlands and Victorian Alps regions.

== See also ==
- List of Carex species
