= Mutation Nation =

1992 video game

- Developer: SNK
- Publisher: SNK
- Producer: Eikichi Kawasaki
- Designer: Kenji Ishimoto
- Programmer: Akio Ooi
- Artists: J. Mikami; Masato Miyoshi; R. Miyazaki
- Composer: Masahiko Hataya
- Platforms: Arcade, Neo Geo AES, Neo Geo CD
- Release: Arcade: WW: 16 March 1992; Neo Geo AES: WW: 17 April 1992; Neo Geo CD: JP: 25 February 1995; NA: October 1996
- Genre: Beat 'em up
- Modes: Single-player, multiplayer
- Arcade system: Neo Geo MVS

Mutation Nation (Note: Japanese: ミューテイション・ネイション, Hepburn: Myūteishon Neishon) is a 1992 beat 'em up video game developed and published by SNK for the Neo Geo arcade and home platforms. It was later released on the Wii Virtual Console. Hamster Corporation re-released the game as part of their ACA Neo Geo series for the PlayStation 4, Xbox One, Nintendo Switch, Windows, Android and iOS.

== Gameplay ==
Gameplay screenshot showcasing Ricky performing a charged special explosion attack against an enemy.

One or two players (Player 1 as Ricky and Player 2 as Johnny) fight their way through the six levels of various mutated and mechanical enemies, each level containing one or more sub-bosses before an actual boss appears at the end of each stage. The game plays close to the usual beat 'em up mold allowing the player to utilize various combos, jumping attacks, throws and special moves to utilize on the opposition. Rather than the standard fare of allowing players to pick up objects to use as weapons against the enemy, Mutation Nation instead uses a system where the player can pick up one of four elemental spheres that allow the player the ability to unleash screen-filling super attacks. There are also neutral spheres that will give life back to the player and increase the number of super attacks that they can use.

=== Spheres ===
These are the various elemental spheres that can be picked up by the player and used for special attacks. Each sphere is represented by a letter and color that helps the player tell them apart. If the players do not have any spheres available, they can instead sacrifice part of their life meter to unleash a flurry of attacks.

- Light - yellow with the letter A written on it. The light sphere unleashes the fastest but also least damaging attack in the game. The player splits into two bodies of light that shoot out in opposite directions before coming back together to reform the body after the enemies have been knocked down.
- Fire - this sphere is represented by the letter B and has a reddish color. It unleashes a large explosion from the player's hands which does heavy damage to everything on screen.
- Lightning - the lightning sphere has a blue color and the letter C. The attack it produces is by far the slowest attack in the game, but the player is invincible for the duration of the entire animation. The character will jump up off screen and come down a few moments later hitting the ground to create lightning bolts that go off in all directions for moderate damage.
- Wind - the last sphere is green and has the letter D on it. It unleashes the most powerful attack in the game where the player turns into a massive green tornado that will travel back and forth over the screen, mowing down everything in its path and often hitting more than once for massive damage.

== Plot ==
In the year 2050, a mad scientist's superiors shut down his bizarre biological experiments. His lab later explodes, however, and the scientist himself mysteriously disappears. Several years later, new buildings exist within the forgotten slums where the experiments took place, and a genetic virus has suddenly started spreading among the tenants, turning them into vicious mutants. Two young locals, Ricky Jones and Johnny Hart, return to town after having been away for a long time, and when they see the chaos that's happening, they take it upon themselves to clean up the town before the mutants spread across the nation. Along the way, they come across not only the mutants, but also robotic foes that the mad scientist has created to stop them.

== Reception ==
Reception

Review scores
Publication	Score
AllGame	(NG) 2/5
Aktueller Software Markt	(NG) 8 / 12
Consoles +	(NG) 84%
Computer and Video Games	(NG) 75 / 100
Electronic Gaming Monthly	(NG) 26 / 40
Famitsu	(NG) 23 / 40
GamePro	(NG) 18.5 / 20
HobbyConsolas	(NG) 92 / 100
Joypad	(NG) 88%
Joystick	(NG) 92%
Nintendo Life	(NS) 8 / 10
Player One	(NG) 80%

RePlay reported Mutation Nation to be the fifth most-popular arcade game at the time. In Japan, Game Machine listed Mutation Nation on their May 1, 1992 issue as being the sixteenth most-popular arcade game at the time. The title received generally favourable reception from critics since its release in arcades and other platforms.

AllGame's Kyle Knight regarded the sphere-based super-attack system as innovative but criticized issues with the controls, repetitive gameplay, enemy AI and average audiovisual presentation. Aktueller Software Markt's Hans-Joachim Amann praised the visuals and large character sprites but criticized the sound design. Consoles +' Marc Menier and Axel also commended the visual presentation, sprite animations, sound, playability and longevity. Computer and Video Games' Frank O'Connor gave positive remarks to the audiovisual presentation as well, stating that its gameplay is good for beat 'em up standards but criticized the lack of originality. Electronic Gaming Monthly's four reviewers praised the graphics and sound but criticized the Neo Geo AES version for its use of unlimited continues. GamePro's Slasher Quan commended the colorful visuals, background details, enemy variety and controls but criticized the lack of a throw move.

Hobby Consolas' Marcos García gave positive remarks to the multiplayer, digitized sound and playability but noted the lack of additional moves for the main characters. Joypad's Nourdine Nini and Joystick's Jean-Marc Demoly gave positive comments to its graphics, character animations, controls and sound. Nintendo Life's Dave Frear praised the varied character designs and rock-style music. Player One's Christophe Pottier commended its beautiful scenery and animation, but considered Mutation Nation an "average" game compared to other beat 'em ups on the same platform.
