= Surgical Strike (video game) =

1995 video game

- Developer: The Code Monkeys
- Publisher: Sega
- Director: James Riley
- Producer: Tony Van
- Composer: Mars Lasar
- Platforms: Sega CD, 32X
- Release: NA: June 1995; EU: September 1995
- Genres: Action, interactive movie
- Mode: Single-player

Surgical Strike is a 1995 full motion video based game developed by The Code Monkeys and published by Sega for the Sega CD in North America and Europe. The game sees players piloting a special hovercraft mounted with weapons as they try to clear out an area containing missiles that the player must shoot within a set time limit, while contending with enemy terrorists and other objectives.

An enhanced 32X CD version of the game was published by Tec Toy exclusively in Brazil.

== Reception ==
The four reviewers of Electronic Gaming Monthly were divided over the Sega CD version. Two of them, while criticizing that the limited ammunition negatively affects the gameplay, praised the exciting action and the "seamless" transitions between full motion video sequences. The other two denounced the game as suffering from grainy, repetitive FMV which hampers the gameplay. They gave it an average score of 6 out of 10. GamePro gave it a mixed review, applauding the quality and intensity of the full motion video but criticizing the driving controls.

Next Generation reviewed the Sega CD version of the game, rating it two stars out of five.

In France, Surgical Strike topped the Mega-CD ranking published by Mega Force magazine in November 1995, ahead of Final Fight CD and Jaguar XJ220.
