= Wirehead (video game) =

1995 video game

- Cover art by Robert Rodriguez
- Developer: The Code Monkeys
- Publisher: Sega
- Platform: Sega CD
- Release: September 1995
- Genre: Adventure
- Mode: Single-player

Wirehead is a 1995 interactive film developed by The Code Monkeys and published by Sega for the Sega CD. It was produced by MGM Interactive. Wirehead was one of the last games released for the Sega CD, and one of the platform's most ambitious full-motion video productions.

== Gameplay ==
Ned Hubbard (Steve Witting) is a mild-mannered family man who has a wireless device implanted into his brain. When strange men attempt to kidnap Ned from his home, he flees for his life. The player guides Ned by manipulating his brain–computer interface. Every few seconds, the player must react quickly to an audiovisual prompt, and guide Ned in one of three or four possible directions. In most cases, one option advances the game, and the others lead to Ned's downfall. Although Ned's evasive maneuvers are almost invariably non-violent, a few circumstances instigate "combat mode", in which the player has two attack options: punch or kick.

== Development ==
The Sega CD version was released in September 1995. A version for the Sega CD 32X was announced, but never released.

== Reception ==
Defunct Games gave the game a C+ review score.
