= Soulstar =

1994 video game

- North American cover art by James Ryman
- Developer: Core Design
- Publishers: WW: Core Design; JP: Victor Entertainment
- Producer: Jeremy Heath-Smith
- Designer: Guy Miller
- Programmer: Sarah Avory
- Artist: Roberto Cirillo
- Composer: Nathan McCree
- Platform: Sega CD
- Release: NA: September 1994; EU: October 1994; JP: 22 December 1994
- Genres: Rail shooter, third-person shooter
- Modes: Single-player, multiplayer

Soulstar is a hybrid rail shooter/third-person shooter video game developed and published by Core Design for the Sega CD in North America in September 1994, Europe in October by Core Design, and in Japan by Victor Entertainment on December 22.

In the game, the ancient Myrkoids alien race arrive upon the titular solar system to drain its planets of resources and destroy them, and it is up to Bryk Hammelt of the Cryo-Commandos warrior race to eliminate the Myrkoids by piloting his morphing fighter craft, the Aggressor. As the penultimate title developed by Core Design for the Sega CD, Soulstar heavily uses its scaling and rotation capabilities, similarly to other titles on the system created by the same developer, such as Thunderhawk and Battlecorps, which feature the same pseudo-3D graphical style. It is inspired by Sega's 1988 arcade game Galaxy Force II.

Upon release, Soulstar received praise from critics for its technical achievement on the hardware, soundtrack and multiple playstyles, though it received criticism for the repetitive gameplay. Nevertheless, the game was named "Best Shooter" on the Sega CD by GameFan. Ports for the 32X, Atari Jaguar CD and PC were in development by Core Design, but they were never released.

== Gameplay ==

Top: Strike Craft gameplay.
Bottom: Turbo Copter gameplay.

Soulstar is a shooter game that is primarily played in a third-person perspective behind the ship, similar to Galaxy Force II and Star Fox, where players take the role of Bryk Hammelt from the Cryo-Commandos in a mission to exterminate the alien race known as the Myrkoids, who have arrived on the titular Soulstar system to invade it. The gameplay is based around three types of space combat vehicles that the player's ship, the Aggressor, can transform into depending on the situation.

The first mode is an on rails shoot 'em up akin to Space Harrier, where it involves flying the Sub-light Strike Craft through space towards huge scaling sprites of a planet or space station and flying across a texture mapped planetscape, while shooting upcoming enemies from either the front or behind and collecting power-ups along the way.

The second mode involves controlling the Turbo Copter hovercraft in environments of 360°, allowing players to roam freely across the map on missions that take place in indoor or outdoor areas. In this mode, players are tasked with eliminating primary targets within the area, which are displayed before the start of each level at the mission briefing screen. A notable feature of the game is how the difficulty level is selected: After entering the second level and destroying the boss of the area, there are three warp gates that players can activate, each one representing a fixed level of difficulty of the game (from Easy to Hard) and a set number of levels to go through. At the end of each level set, the player returns to the space station to choose a remaining warp gate.

The third mode is similar to the Turbo Copter mode in terms of gameplay, but this time players control the Combat Walker mecha, which is capable of dashing along the ground and hover above the terrain for a brief period of time. Each vehicle in the three gameplay modes offer a different control scheme and functions. The game also has a two-player cooperative mode, where the first player pilots the spaceship, while the second players acts as an air gunner aiming at the enemies.

== Plot ==
The Myrkoids, an ancient alien species with a cold and unified mind have descended upon many star systems, stealing and draining every planet of their resources and destroying them in the process. Following the destruction of his home system, Bryk Hammelt, the last from a noble warrior race known as the Cryo-Commandos, sets out in his morphing starship, the Aggressor, to hunt down and eradicate the Myrkoids from existence, who have arrived at the Soulstar system to repeat their same process of planetary extermination.

== Development ==
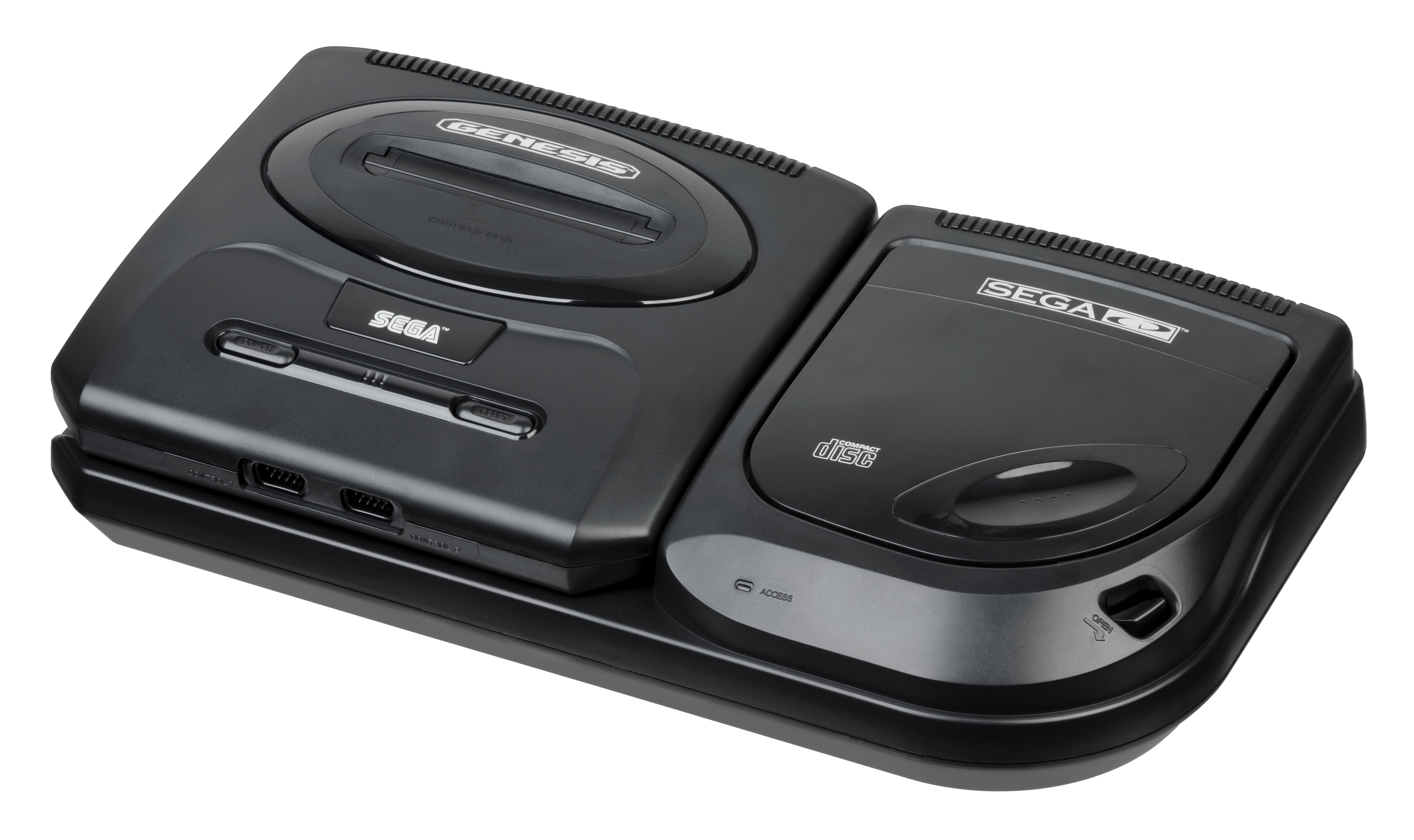
Soulstar is one of the handful of games developed by Core Design that made heavy use of the Sega CD's ASIC chip to produce its visuals.

Soulstar was conceived by Sarah Jane Avory after work on the Sega CD port of Thunderhawk was completed. Avory had the desire to develop a project similar to Galaxy Force II, as it was one of her favorite titles in arcades. However, no existing hardware released at the time on the market was capable of producing visuals of similar fidelity until the arrival of the Sega CD in 1991, which allowed Avory and one of her co-workers to make their vision a reality. The project began development in March 1993, two months after Thunderhawk was released in North America on Sega CD and was announced in late 1993 under the original name Aggressor and later as Soulstar: Malice of The Myrkoids in early 1994, along with other then-upcoming titles for the add-on by Core Design such as Battlecorps, Heimdall and BC Racers (then titled Chuck Rally).

Soulstar makes intensive use of the features available on the Sega CD hardware for its visuals, in addition to being the first title on the add-on that displayed sprites at 64 colors. Avory and her team planned on pushing the hardware as much as they could from the beginning of its development, with all of the sprites featured in the game being built on the system's WRAM as "stamp maps" in order to be displayed on-screen by the Sega Genesis, in addition to creating a display list to showcase up to 80 moving sprites. Avory also integrated a graphical trick that allowed both the sprites and terrain to exhibit color depth-fading. The soundtrack composed by Nathan McCree was implemented early in development and enters synchronization with gameplay during the Sub-light Strike Craft sections. Both Battlecorps and Soulstar shared the same game engine as with Thunderhawk on the Sega CD.

== Release ==
Soulstar was first was showcased during the Winter Consumer Electronics Show in 1994, with early previews showing elements that are not present in the final release. The game was first released in Europe in April, featuring the option of choosing between different languages for in-game options and text. The title was later brought to North America by Time Warner Interactive in September, with the language options being removed from this release. It was also published during the same year in Japan by Victor Entertainment on December 22, with all the in-game text left entirely in English.

=== Soulstar X ===
A version of the game for the Sega 32X, titled Soulstar X, was in development by Core Design and announced in 1995. Originally planned for an April 1995 release and later planned to be launched on Autumn/August, this version was set to feature improved gameplay and new weapons, in addition to sporting pre-rendered graphics and sprites at 256 colors that were created by using the Wavefront graphics software program found on Silicon Graphics (SGI) workstations, instead of the original hand-drawn look on Sega CD but was ultimately never released due to the commercial failure of the add-on. On February 20, 2010, a ROM image of an early but playable prototype of Soulstar X for the 32X was leaked online by a video game collector at the SEGASaturno forums.

A port of Soulstar X to the PC was also planned and in development by Core Design, but never released.

=== Atari Jaguar CD version ===
Gameplay screenshot from the unreleased Atari Jaguar CD version of Soulstar.

A port of Soulstar for the Atari Jaguar CD was in development by Core Design and announced at the same time as Soulstar X for the 32X. This version was set to feature the same pre-rendered sprites as the 32X version but with reworked graphics compared to the Sega CD original, in addition to redone FMV sequences, while retaining the same gameplay found on the original version, albeit at a faster frame rate. In a February 1995 interview by Atari Explorer Online with former Core Design employee Andrew Smith, he stated that work on the port was almost finished but not without the team coming across with issues found within the system's multi-chip architecture, in order to meet a strict time limit for completion. Smith also said that they were open to the idea of porting the title to the Atari Jaguar, but suggested that some elements would need to be omitted for a cartridge release, and that the idea would also need to be proven viable to Atari Corporation. It was first shown during Spring ECTS '95 and was originally planned for a Q2 1995 release.

Soulstar for the Jaguar CD was then showcased during E3 1995 along with Soulstar X, and now planned for an August/Q3 1995 release. Though internal documents from Atari Corp. listed the port as in development and later advertised to be launched in late 1995, the port was never released, with no explanation given in regards to its cancellation. Although Andrew Smith stated that the company did have some titles from their catalog listed to be converted for the Jaguar, with Susan Lusty of Core Design stating at WCES '95 that both Swagman and Tomb Raider were planned to be released for the add-on, Core's PR manager Susie Hamilton clarified in 1999 that Soulstar was their only title in development for the platform.

An ISO image of a playable build of the Jaguar CD version was leaked online, but gameplay is very prone to glitches and game-crashing bugs. A bootleg copy of this version was seen running at the fan festival Jaguar Connexion 2005. Video game collector and community member Matt Smith uploaded a full playthrough from an almost complete build of the Jaguar CD version on YouTube, with plans to be released online for download in the future.

== Reception ==
Reception

Review scores
Publication	Score
Beep! MegaDrive	7.5/10
Computer and Video Games	91/100
Edge	7/10
GameFan	258/300
GamesMaster	93/100
HobbyConsolas	92/100
Hyper	78%
M! Games	76%
Mean Machines Sega	77/100
Mega Fun	85%
Micromanía	88%
Player One	92%
Superjuegos	93/100
Video Games (DE)	84%
VideoGames & Computer Entertainment	9/10
Megablast	85%
Play Time	85%
Sega Force	55/100; 80 / 100

Award
Publication	Award
GameFan (1994)	Best Shooter

Soulstar got mixed-to-positive response upon release. GamePro gave the game a mixed review, saying that the graphics and audio are impressive, but that "the interstellar flying, which dominates the game, makes you feel like you're confined to a tight, invisible box - a drawback for Mode 7 fans." They also commented that the steep difficulty curve makes the game unsuitable for novice gamers.
