= Tomcat Alley =

1994 video game

- Developers: The Code Monkeys (Sega CD); Novotrade (PC)
- Publisher: Sega
- Designer: John Zuur Platten
- Platforms: Sega CD, Windows
- Release: Sega CD: NA: March 1994; EU: May 1994; Windows 95: NA: November 13, 1995
- Genre: Interactive film
- Mode: Single-player

Tomcat Alley is an interactive movie FMV video game developed by The Code Monkeys for Sega CD. It was the first Sega CD game to feature extensive full screen, full motion video. It was later released, with higher quality video, for Windows-based PCs. A 32X version was also in development, but never released.

== Storyline ==
The player controls a United States Navy pilot who has to bring peace and stability to the world after the cash-poor former Soviet Union sold off some of its military equipment to an unfriendly government.

The game takes place in a full screen, full motion video, first-person perspective, and the player has to move quickly to launch missiles at enemy aircraft.

== Critical reception ==
Reception

Review scores
Publication	Score
AllGame	4.5/5 (SCD)
Electronic Gaming Monthly	7/10, 6/10, 5/10, 5/10 (SCD)

GamePro named Tomcat Alley the best Sega CD game at the 1994 Consumer Electronics Show, commenting, "The demo at CES was stunning. It still had that grainy Sega CD look and feel, but you actually felt like you were flying inside the Tomcat." They later reviewed the game and gave it a perfect score, stating: "Tomcat Alley uses actors, sets, and outstanding aerial footage to create a breathtaking aerial battlefield." Four reviewers in Electronic Gaming Monthly commented on the game, with two reviewers complimenting that the FMV sequences use the whole screen instead of a small window, while another dismissed the game saying: "Aaargh, another full-motion video game! If you've played Night Trap or Double Switch, then you've played Tomcat Alley. ... the video [is] very blocky and often hard to see". In a retrospective review, Christopher Baker of Allgame wrote that the phrases and scenes are not as repetitive compared to other Sega CD games and praised the gameplay being fun and praised the game's challenging difficulty without being too frustrating.

In 1995, Flux magazine ranked the game 81st on their Top 100 Video Games summarizing: "A full-motion video game that doesn't suck, thanks to decent interactivity, semi randomized gameplay, and the hot pilot babe."
