= Heavy Nova (video game) =

1991 video game

- Developer: Micronet
- Publisher: Micronet
- Platforms: Sega CD, Genesis, X68000
- Release: Mega-CD: JP: December 12, 1991; Genesis: NA: December 1991; X68000: JP: April 10, 1992
- Genres: Fighting, platform
- Modes: Single-player, multiplayer

Heavy Nova (ヘビーノバ) is a 1991 video game developed and published by Micronet for the Sega CD, Sega Genesis, and X68000 that combines elements of fighting games with platform games and mission elements. Players assume the role of a robot operator destined to earn the highest operator rank. To do so, the robot – known in the game as a Heavy DOLL – must complete a combat training camp which prompts the 2D Platformer stages. The player then must combat other Heavy DOLLs as the end-level bosses which prompts the 2D fighting elements. A sequel, Black Hole Assault, was released in 1992; it is a fighting game unlike its predecessor.

== Plot ==
Sometime in Earth's future, it came to humanity's realization that the Earth's natural resources were starting to decline, but despite every nation's attempts, the Earth's environment and resources continued thin. Suddenly, an alien race appeared in the Solar System. Hailing from the planet Akirov, the aliens had been observing Earth for centuries and arrived in order to save it. With their technological help, Earth's environment was replenished and Humans were able to travel deeper into space. By the year 2102, humanity was finally at peace thanks to the Akirovians.

Ten years later, a plot to enslave humanity was discovered to be a part of the Akirovian's plans and a war waged between the two. Eight years later, the Akirovians lost and left the Solar System. The primary machines for Earth's victory came from original Akirovian designed machines: giant remote controlled robots first used to design and repair Earth's satellite and colony structures. The robots were favored as Earth's primary line of defense and were dubbed the Heavy D.O.L.L's (Defensive Offensive Lethal Liberator).

Now taking place in 2120, the prospect of earning the highest combat ranking for a Heavy D.O.L.L, the rank of Heavy Nova, has become a long desired military rank. The player assumes the role of such a person attempting to earn that rank who must go through training and combat situations to prove their abilities.

== Gameplay ==
Reception

Review scores
| Publication | Score |
|---|---|
| Mega | 12% |
| Entertainment Weekly | D+ |

Heavy Nova's Single Player game play is separated into two sections: a platform game section and a fighting game section. The player has to destroy every possible enemy robot in the Platformer sections and make it to the end in order to fight the boss awaiting them. The player has various attacks at their disposal with the Idar, most of which they were able to use during combat with the bosses in the Fighting Game stages. During the Fighting Game Stages/Boss Fights, the player had to defeat the boss using various Fighting Game attacks such as a button command that allowed missiles to launch from the Idar's hand. However, both Heavy D.O.L.L robots, player and enemy, has an energy bar under their health meter; the energy bar measures how much strength the player or enemy has in order to move their robot. Taking too much damage results in energy depletion. When the player's energy was depleted to two bars, the player robot cannot move, leaving the player completely vulnerable to enemy attacks.

Alternatively, the 2 Player mode pitches two players against each other using all of the enemy robot models encountered in the game.

== Reception ==
Heavy Nova received very poor reviews. Mega said that "badly animated robots, appalling music and terribly unresponsive controls as much fun as colouring in each square on a piece of graph paper with a different pen... with a headache... listening to Max Bygraves." Classic Game Room's Mark Bussler praised its intro cutscene, but called it "possibly the worst video game I've ever played", criticizing the clumsy controls, uninspired level design, and flawed collision detection that turns the boss fights into a matter of "simply mashing buttons and hoping for the best".

Entertainment Weekly gave the game a D+ and wrote that "Heavy Nova's high-stepping, stainless-steel robot hero may have a certain wacky appeal — if Michael Jackson were the Terminator, this is what his skeleton would look like — but it also has the most ponderous, difficult-to-master moves this side of a tai chi tournament. Identically languid opponents and shamelessly minimal action sequences make this game the perfect corrective to acute caffeine poisoning."
