= Battlecorps =

1994 video game

- European cover art
- Developer: Core Design
- Publisher: Core Design
- Producer: Jeremy Heath-Smith
- Designers: Jason Gee; Jonathon Hilliard
- Programmer: Jonathon Hilliard
- Artist: Jason Gee
- Composer: Martin Iveson
- Platform: Sega CD
- Release: NA/EU: August 1994; JP: September 30, 1994
- Genre: Shooter
- Mode: Single-player

Battlecorps is a 1994 shooter video game developed and published by Core Design for the Sega CD.

== Gameplay ==
Battlecorps involves a walking robot in a variety of terrain, armed with a large number of different weapons. Player characters include kickboxing specialist Becky Ojo, cyborg Dika "A" Jang, and special forces soldier Jack Cutter. The game is set in the year 2085 on the mining planet Mandelbrot's World.

== Development and release ==
Battlecorps was developed by British studio Core Design. The game's staff consisted of programmer and lead designer Jonathan Hilliard; graphic artist Jason Gee; product manager Guy Miller; and producer Jeremy Heath-Smith. Gee and Miller also contributed to the design and story. The music was composed by Martin Iveson with live guitar solos provided by Anthony Wheeldon. Miller lent his recorded voice to the start of the game's missions. Battlecorps was created simultaneously with Core Design's Soulstar, both being Sega CD projects built off the custom technology from the company's previous title AH-3 Thunderstrike. The project began as a series of pencil sketches. Once the mech shooter concept was established, the game's initial environment was crafted using the AH-3 Thunderstrike engine. Every aspect of Battlecorps was then drawn out on paper.

Hilliard claimed that development only took around six months. The team carefully planned out Battlecorps around the Sega CD's competent graphics chip as well as its limitations such as a relatively small amount of video RAM. Like Soulstar, the game utilizes depth shading for distant objects and increases the number of texture-mapped landscape colors found in AH-3 Thunderstrike from 16 to 64, compensating by making the display window smaller. For the terrains, Core Design heavily applied the console's sprite-scaling capability. Hilliard wrote a mere ten lines of code to the graphics sizing chip so that the ground is "effectively a huge sprite that scales and rotates beneath you." He further recalled, "I figured out that you could trick the flat floor drawing system into drawing textured (fake) perspective walls. It took a bit of work, you get a bit of wasted render overhead for each wall drawn, and the perspective on the walls is a bit wonky, but in the end it looked great, and no one else had done it yet."

Battlecorps makes limited use of full-motion video but team members were not fans of the feature and opted to take advantage of the Sega CD's other hardware traits to prioritize playability. It was reported early in production that the game would take place on six different planets. This was later changed to three moons and was then further reduced to a single planet consisting of six distinct terrain types. When questioned about the lack of a save or password feature, Hilliard could not recall the reason but speculated it could have been time-related, a management decision, or simply forgotten. Weapon power-ups that could be picked up during missions were planned at one point but were cut as testers preferred having pre-mounted weapons in limited-quantities.

Core Design self-published Battlecorps in Europe in August 1994 while Time Warner Interactive was the game's distributor for the North American release that same month. Victor Entertainment published the game in Japan on September 30, 1994.

== Reception ==
Reception

Review score
Publication	Score
Electronic Gaming Monthly	8/10, 6/10, 5/10, 6/10

Electronic Gaming Monthly's four reviewers, one reviewer complimented the game as one of the better Sega CD titles. The other three reviewers dismissed the graphics as being too pixelated, with the initial positive review saying it was difficult to see what was shooting the player. Two reviewers found the music to be inappropriate for the action scenes.

Next Generation reviewed the game, rating it three stars out of five. The reviewer called it a "Big mistake" to trade the flying machines of Thunderstrike for the walking robot, as "the net effect is the slowing down of action". He did find that the game offered "a relatively exciting challenge" but criticized the "bitmaps that look fine if you fly by them look blocky walking up to them" and quipped that "we'll keep waiting for Thunderstrike II."

The game was reviewed in French magazine Supersonic #23 (Jul, 1994), which gave the game a rating of 94%, saying that Core Design knows how to make good games for the Mega CD.

The game was reviewed in French magazine Consoles Plus #34 (Aug, 1994), which gave the game a rating of 89% and found that its visuals were innovative, but that the game becomes repetitive over time.

Martin Hughes reviewed Battlecorps for the website Sega-16.com (Aug 01, 2011) and stated that "Whether you want to see the game though, or just blow up some stuff, Battlecorps caters for all."
