= Thunderhawk (video game) =

1992 military helicopter simulator video game

Thunderhawk AH-73M
- Developer: Core Design
- Publishers: Core Design (original); JVC Musical Industries (remake)
- Producer: Jeremy Heath-Smith
- Designers: Simon Phipps; Mark Price; Jason Gee; Sean Dunlevy
- Programmers: Sarah Avory (68000), Sean Dunlevy (8086)
- Artist: Jason Gee
- Composers: Martin Walker (original); Martin Iveson (remake)
- Platforms: Amiga, MS-DOS, Sega CD, Atari ST
- Release: Amiga: EU: 1992; MS-DOS: NA: 1992 (original); NA: 1996 (remake); Sega CD: NA: 1993; EU: September 1, 1993
- Genre: Combat flight simulation
- Mode: Single-player

Thunderhawk, known as AH-3 Thunderstrike in North America (in Europe known as Thunderhawk AH-73M), is a combat flight simulation video game developed and published by Core Design and released for Amiga and MS-DOS in 1992. A remake was made and published by JVC Musical Industries for Sega CD in 1993 and for MS-DOS in 1996. An Atari Jaguar CD port was planned but never released. In the game, the player flies a fictional AH-73M attack helicopter.

== Gameplay ==
The game consists of several campaigns for each one of ten world areas. The campaigns are themed around real events or activities in these areas (e.g., escorting a UN humanitarian convoy during the Bosnian War, fighting pirates in the South China Sea, etc.)

A typical campaign consists of four or five missions. Each mission has a primary objective that must be completed to successfully complete the mission, there are other targets in each missions such as tanks and SAM launchers but these are only used to help the player boost their score. The primary target is usually a major structure like an enemy base or a bridge.

Usually the player is equipped with a standard set of weapons - 16 missiles, 76 rockets, and a machine gun with unlimited ammunition. On some special missions the rockets are replaced by a weapon that is critical to the success of that particular mission, such as a runway cratering system when the primary objective is to destroy an airbase or a bomb when destruction of a bridge is the primary objective.

The control system for Thunderhawk was fairly unusual for the platforms supporting a mouse. It used the mouse for basic control, plus some keyboard input for rarely used commands. Moving the mouse would tilt the helicopter in the specified direction, and make it start moving in that direction. Pressing the left mouse button fires weapons. When the right mouse button was held, moving the mouse up and down changed altitude, while side to side yawed the helicopter side to side.

== Reception ==
Reception

Review scores
Publication	Score
Edge	7/10 (Sega CD)
MegaTech	91%
Mega	91%

The game received critical acclaim, and the Mega CD version was a bestseller in the UK. Mega placed the game at #1 in their Top Mega-CD Games of All Time, with the sequel Battlecorps being fourth on the same list. Retro Gamer included it on their list of top ten Mega-CD games. Next Generation called it the best game release for Sega CD. German magazine Video Games regarded Thunderhawk as a showcase for the Mega-CD hardware, describing it as a compelling reason to own the add-on. In 1995, Flux magazine ranked the Sega CD version 27th on their "Top 100 Video Games".

The game sold about 300,000 units in Europe. Core Design co-founder Jeremy Smith recalled in 1997 that the Amiga and PC versions sold approximately 180,000 copies combined, while the subsequent Mega-CD version sold nearly 400,000 copies.

== Sequels ==
Thunderhawk spawned two sequels, Firestorm: Thunderhawk 2 and Thunderhawk: Operation Phoenix. Firestorm was created using the same game engine as the original Thunderhawk. Another Core Design game, Shellshock, also used the Thunderhawk engine.
