= List of Accolade games =

This is a list of games published by Accolade (renamed as Infogrames North America, Inc. in 1999), an American video game developer and publisher based in San Jose, California. The company was founded as Accolade in 1984 by Alan Miller and Bob Whitehead, who had previously co-founded Activision in 1979. The company became known for numerous sports franchises, including HardBall!, Jack Nicklaus, and Test Drive.

== Games ==
=== As Accolade ===
Complete list of games published and/or developed by Accolade
Game	Platform(s)	Release	Developer	Publisher	Ref
SunDog: Frozen Legacy	Apple II	1984	FTL Games	Accolade	
HardBall!	Apple II, Atari 8-bit, C64	1985	Accolade		
HardBall!	Amstrad CPC, Mac, ZX Spectrum	1986	Accolade		
HardBall!	Amiga, Apple IIGS, Atari ST, MS-DOS, MSX	1987	Accolade		
HardBall!	Genesis	1991	Accolade		
Fight Night	Apple II	1985	Sydney Development Corporation	Accolade	
Fight Night	Atari 8-bit, C64	1986	Sydney Development Corporation	Accolade	
Fight Night	Atari 8-bit cartridge	1987	Sydney Development Corporation	Accolade	
Fight Night	Atari 7800	1988	Sydney Development Corporation	Accolade	
Law of the West	Apple II, C64	1985	Accolade		
Law of the West	NES, PC-88, PC-98	1987	Accolade		
The Dam Busters	Apple II, MS-DOS, ZX Spectrum, C64	1985	Sydney Development Corporation	Accolade	
Psi-5 Trading Company	C64	1986	Accolade		
Psi-5 Trading Company	Amstrad CPC, Amstrad PCW, ZX Spectrum	1987	Accolade		
Mean 18	Amiga, Atari ST, MS-DOS	1986	Microsmiths	Accolade	
Mean 18	Apple IIGS	1987	Microsmiths	Accolade	
Mean 18	Atari 7800	1989	Microsmiths	Accolade	
Killed Until Dead	C64	1986	Artech Studios	Accolade	
Killed Until Dead	Apple II	1987	Artech Studios	Accolade	
Ace of Aces	C64	1986	Artech Studios	Accolade	
Ace of Aces	MS-DOS	1987	Artech Studios	Accolade	
Ace of Aces	Atari 7800, Atari 8-bit	1988	Artech Studios	Accolade	
Accolade Comics	Apple II, C64	1987	Distinctive Software	Accolade	
The Train: Escape to Normandy	Apple II, C64	1987	Artech Digital Entertainment	Accolade	
The Train: Escape to Normandy	Amstrad CPC, MS-DOS, ZX Spectrum	1988	Artech Digital Entertainment	Accolade	
4th & Inches	C64, Apple II	1987	Accolade		
4th & Inches	Amiga, Apple IIGS, MS-DOS, Mac	1988	Accolade		
Pinball Wizard	MS-DOS	1987	ERE Informatique	Accolade	
Pinball Wizard	Atari ST	1988	ERE Informatique	Accolade	
Mini-Putt	C64, MS-DOS	1987	Artech Studios	Accolade	
Mini-Putt	Apple IIGS	1988	Artech Studios	Accolade	
Apollo 18: Mission to the Moon	C64	1987	Artech Studios	Accolade	
Apollo 18: Mission to the Moon	MS-DOS	1988	Artech Studios	Accolade	
Power at Sea	C64	1988	Distinctive Software	Accolade	
Test Drive	Amiga, Atari ST, C64, MS-DOS	1987	Distinctive Software	Accolade	
Test Drive	Apple II	1988	Distinctive Software	Accolade	
Rack 'Em	MS-DOS	1988	Artech Studios	Accolade	
Serve & Volley	Apple II, Apple IIGS, C64, MS-DOS	1988	Artech Studios	Accolade	
Fast Break	C64, MS-DOS	1988	Accolade		
Fast Break	Amiga, Apple IIGS, Mac	1989	Accolade		
Grand Prix Circuit	C64, MS-DOS	1988	Distinctive Software	Accolade	
Grand Prix Circuit	Amiga, Apple IIGS, Mac	1989	Distinctive Software	Accolade	
Grand Prix Circuit	Amstrad CPC, ZX Spectrum	1990	Distinctive Software	Accolade	
Card Sharks	C64	1988	Accolade		
TKO	C64	1988	Accolade	Electronic Arts	
TKO	MS-DOS	1989	Accolade	Electronic Arts	
Bubble Ghost	Amiga, Atari ST, Apple II, Apple IIGS, C64, MS-DOS	1988	ERE Informatique	Accolade	
Jack Nicklaus' Greatest 18 Holes of Major Championship Golf	C64, MS-DOS	1988	Sculptured Software	Accolade	
Jack Nicklaus' Greatest 18 Holes of Major Championship Golf	Amiga, Amstrad CPC, Apple IIGS, Atari ST	1989	Sculptured Software	Accolade	
Jack Nicklaus' Greatest 18 Holes of Major Championship Golf	Mac, TG-16	1990	Sculptured Software	Accolade	
Steel Thunder	C64, MS-DOS	1988	Accolade		
Hardball II	MS-DOS	1989	Distinctive Software	Accolade	
Hardball II	Amiga, Mac	1990	Distinctive Software	Accolade	
Test Drive II: The Duel	Amiga, Amstrad CPC, Apple IIGS, C64, MS-DOS, Mac, ZX Spectrum	1989	Distinctive Software	Accolade	
Test Drive II: The Duel	Atari ST	1990	Distinctive Software	Accolade	
Test Drive II: The Duel	Genesis, Super NES	1992	Distinctive Software	Accolade	
Blue Angels: Formation Flight Simulation	Amiga, Atari ST, MS-DOS	1989	Artech Studios	Accolade	
Blue Angels: Formation Flight Simulation	C64	1990	Artech Studios	Accolade	
Day of the Viper	Amiga, Atari ST	1989	Accolade		
Day of the Viper	MS-DOS	1990	Accolade		
Don't Go Alone	MS-DOS	1989	Sterling Silver Software	Accolade	
The Cycles: International Grand Prix Racing	Amiga, C64, MS-DOS	1989	Distinctive Software	Accolade	
The Cycles: International Grand Prix Racing	Amstrad CPC, Mac OS, ZX Spectrum	1990	Distinctive Software	Accolade	
The Third Courier	MS-DOS	1989	Manley & Associates	Accolade	
The Third Courier	Amiga, Apple IIGS, Atari ST	1990	Manley & Associates	Accolade	
Bar Games	MS-DOS	1989	Accolade		
Bar Games	Amiga	1990	Accolade		
Strike Aces	Amiga, MS-DOS	1990	Vektor Grafix	Accolade	
Test Drive III: The Passion	MS-DOS	1990	Accolade		
Gunboat	Amstrad CPC, MS-DOS, ZX Spectrum	1990	Accolade		
Gunboat	Amiga	1991	Accolade		
Gunboat	Turbo-Grafx 16	1992	Accolade		
Heat Wave	Amiga, Atari ST, C64, MS-DOS	1990	Artech Studios	Accolade	
Ishido: The Way of Stones	Amiga, MS-DOS, Genesis, Mac	1990	Publishing International	Accolade	
The Game of Harmony	Amiga, C64, MS-DOS	1990	The Assembly Line	Accolade	
The Game of Harmony	Game Boy	1991	The Assembly Line	Accolade	
Altered Destiny	MS-DOS	1990	Accolade		
Altered Destiny	Amiga	1991	Accolade		
Stratego	MS-DOS, Mac	1990	Accolade		
Stratego	Amiga, Atari ST, C64	1991	Accolade		
Jack Nicklaus' Unlimited Golf & Course Design	Amiga, MS-DOS	1990	Sculptured Software	Accolade	
Elvira: Mistress of the Dark	Amiga, MS-DOS	1990	Horror Soft	Accolade	
Elvira: Mistress of the Dark	Atari ST, C64	1991	Horror Soft	Accolade	
Les Manley in: Search for the King	MS-DOS	1990	Accolade		
Les Manley in: Search for the King	Amiga	1991	Accolade		
Star Control	Amiga, Amstrad CPC, MS-DOS	1990	Toys for Bob	Accolade	
Star Control	C64, ZX Spectrum	1991	Toys for Bob	Accolade	
The Games: Winter Challenge	MS-DOS	1991	MindSpan	Accolade	
Les Manley in: Lost in L.A.	MS-DOS	1991	Accolade		
The Cardinal of the Kremlin	Amiga	1991	Capstone Software	Accolade	
Turrican	Game Boy, Genesis, TurboGrafx-16	1991	Rainbow Arts	Accolade	
Elvira II: The Jaws of Cerberus	MS-DOS	1991	Horror Soft	Accolade	
Elvira II: The Jaws of Cerberus	Amiga, Atari ST	1992	Horror Soft	Accolade	
Hoverforce	MS-DOS	1991	Astral Software	Accolade	
Mike Ditka Power Football	MS-DOS, Genesis	1991	Accolade		
The Games: Summer Challenge	MS-DOS	1992	MindSpan	Accolade	
The Games: Summer Challenge	Genesis	1993	MindSpan	Accolade	
Jack Nicklaus Golf & Course Design: Signature Edition	MS-DOS	1992	Sculptured Software	Accolade	
Waxworks	Amiga, MS-DOS	1992	Horror Soft	Accolade	
Snoopy's Game Club	MS-DOS	1992	Accolade		
Universal Soldier	Game Boy, Genesis	1992	The Code Monkeys	Accolade	
Grand Prix Unlimited	MS-DOS	1992	Accolade		
Zyconix	Amiga, MS-DOS	1992	Miracle Games	Accolade	
HardBall III	MS-DOS	1992	MindSpan	Accolade	
HardBall III	Genesis	1993	MindSpan	Accolade	
HardBall III	Super NES	1994	MindSpan	Accolade	
Star Control II	MS-DOS	1992	Toys for Bob	Accolade	
Star Control II	3DO	1994	Toys for Bob	Accolade	
WarpSpeed	Super NES	1992	Accolade		
WarpSpeed	Genesis	1993	Accolade		
Speed Racer in The Challenge of Racer X	MS-DOS	1993	Accolade		
Bubsy in Claws Encounters of the Furred Kind	Genesis, Super NES	1993	Accolade		
Pelé!	Genesis	1993	Radical Entertainment	Accolade	
Unnecessary Roughness	MS-DOS	1993	Accolade		
Brett Hull Hockey	Super NES	1994	Radical Entertainment	Accolade	
Unnecessary Roughness '95	MS-DOS, Genesis	1994	Accolade		
Rally	MS-DOS	1994	Pixelkraft	Accolade	
Ballz	Genesis, Super NES, 3DO	1994	PF.Magic	Accolade	
Battle Isle 2200	MS-DOS	1994	Blue Byte	Accolade	
Bubsy II	Genesis, Super NES	1994	Accolade		
Bubsy II	Game Boy	1994	Images Software	Accolade	
Cyclemania	MS-DOS	1994	Compro Games	Accolade	
Barkley Shut Up and Jam!	Genesis, Super NES	1994	Accolade		
HardBall IV	MS-DOS, Genesis	1994	MindSpan	Accolade	
Pelé II: World Tournament Soccer	Genesis	1994	Radical Entertainment	Accolade	
Zero Tolerance	Genesis	1994	Technopop	Accolade	
Combat Cars	Genesis	1994	Accolade		
Speed Racer in My Most Dangerous Adventures	Super NES	1994	Radical Entertainment	Accolade	
Brett Hull Hockey '95	Genesis, Super NES, MS-DOS	1995	Radical Entertainment	Accolade	
HardBall 5	MS-DOS, Genesis	1995	MindSpan	Accolade	
HardBall 5	PlayStation	1996	MindSpan	Accolade	
Barkley Shut Up and Jam! 2	Genesis	1995	Accolade		
Unnecessary Roughness '96	MS-DOS	1995	Accolade		
Star Control 3	MS-DOS	1996	Legend Entertainment	Accolade	
Eradicator	MS-DOS	1996	Accolade		
Deadlock: Planetary Conquest	Windows	1996	Accolade		
PO'ed	PlayStation	1996	Any Channel	Accolade; Warner Interactive Europe (EU)	
Pitball	PlayStation	1996	Warner Interactive Europe	Accolade; Warner Interactive Europe (EU)	
Bubsy 3D	PlayStation	1996	Eidetic	Accolade	
Test Drive: Off-Road	MS-DOS, PlayStation	1996	Elite Systems (MS-DOS), Motivetime Ltd.	Accolade; Eidos Interactive (EU)	
Jack Nicklaus 4	Windows	1997	Cinematronics, LLC	Accolade	
Jack Nicklaus 5	Windows	1997	Eclipse Entertainment	Accolade	
Test Drive 4	PlayStation, Windows	1997	Pitbull Syndicate	Accolade	
Deadlock II: Shrine Wars	Windows	1998	Cyberlore Studios	Accolade	
Test Drive 5	PlayStation, Windows	1998	Pitbull Syndicate	Accolade	
Test Drive: Off-Road 2	PlayStation, Windows	1998	Accolade; Pitbull Syndicate	Accolade	
HardBall 6	Windows	1998	MindSpan	Accolade	
Big Air	PlayStation	1998	Pitbull Syndicate	Accolade	
Redline	Windows	1999	Beyond Games	Accolade	

=== As Infogrames North America ===
Complete list of games published and/or developed by Accolade, after acquisition and re-brand as Infogrames
Game	Platform(s)	Release	Developer	Publisher	Ref
Slave Zero	Dreamcast, Windows	1999	Infogrames North America	Infogrames North America	
Test Drive 6	Dreamcast, PlayStation, Windows	1999	Pitbull Syndicate	Infogrames North America	
Test Drive 6	Game Boy Color	1999	Xantera	Infogrames North America	
Test Drive: Off-Road 3	PlayStation, Windows	1999	Infogrames North America	Infogrames North America	
Test Drive: Off-Road 3	Game Boy Color	1999	Xantera	Infogrames North America	
Demolition Racer	PlayStation, Windows	1999	Pitbull Syndicate	Infogrames North America	
Demolition Racer	Dreamcast	2000	Pitbull Syndicate	Infogrames North America	
Test Drive Cycles	PlayStation, Dreamcast, Windows	Cancelled	Infogrames North America	Infogrames North America	
Test Drive Cycles	Game Boy Color	2000	Xantera	Infogrames North America	
The Ring: Terror's Realm	Sega Dreamcast	2000	Asmik Ace Entertainment	Infogrames North America	
