= List of Apple IIGS games =

This is a list of native 16-bit Apple IIGS game (it does not include 8-bit Apple II games which the system is backward compatible with). A second section lists all the games which were announced, rumored, or otherwise were not released for the system.

== Released games ==
There are currently 257 games on this list. (Note: This number is always up to date by this script)

Title	Year	Developer	Publisher	Genre
4th & Inches	1988	Tony Manso & Sculptured Software	Accolade	Sports
Aaargh!	1988	Synergistic Software	Arcadia Software	Arcade-port
Affaire Santa Fe (l')	2025	Antoine Vignau & Olivier Zardini (Brutal Deluxe)		Adventure
Affaire Sydney (l')	2025	Antoine Vignau & Olivier Zardini (Brutal Deluxe)		Adventure
Affaire Vera Cruz (l')	2025	Antoine Vignau & Olivier Zardini (Brutal Deluxe)		Adventure
Airball	1989	Jason Harper	MicroDeal	Action
Alien Mind	1988	Rob Karr & Matt Crysdale	PBI Software	Action-adventure
Ancient Glory	1993	Logical Design Works, Westwood Associates	Big Red Computer Club	Action
Ancient Land of Ys	1989	Designer Software	Kyodai	Action RPG
Antetris	1990	Peter Jensen		Shoot 'em up
Apple IIgs Karate	2022	Antoine Vignau & Olivier Zardini (Brutal Deluxe)		Fighting
Arkanoid	1988	Ryan Ridges & John Lund	Taito America	Arcade-port
Arkanoid II: Revenge of Doh	1989	Ryan Ridges & John Lund	Taito America	Arcade-port
As the Link Turns	1988	Parik Rao & Scott Pease (Rogue Systems)		Shoot 'em up
Athanor 1: l'éveil	2026	Antoine Vignau & Olivier Zardini (Brutal Deluxe)		Adventure
Balance of Power: The 1990 Edition	1989	Chris Crawford	Mindscape	Simulation
Bard's Tale, The	1987	Rebecca Heineman	Electronic Arts	RPG
Bard's Tale II: The Destiny Knight, The	1988	Rebecca Heineman	Electronic Arts	RPG
Battle Chess	1989	Rebecca Heineman	Interplay Productions	Board
Belle Zohra, La	2024	Antoine Vignau & Olivier Zardini (Brutal Deluxe)		Interactive fiction
Beyond Zork	1988	Brian Moriarty	Infocom	Interactive fiction
Bill Palmer	2021	Antoine Vignau & Olivier Zardini (Brutal Deluxe)		Adventure
Bille Art	1992	Antoine Vignau & Olivier Zardini (Brutal Deluxe)		Puzzle
Black Cauldron	1987	Al Lowe	Sierra	Adventure
Blackjack Academy	1988	Westwood	Micro Illusions	Cards
Block Out	1989	Logical Design Works	California Dreams	Arcade-port
Blockade	1994	Antoine Vignau & Olivier Zardini (Brutal Deluxe)		Puzzle
Boggled	1992	Kenrick Mock (Sound Barrier Systems)		Board
Bouncing Bluster	1989	Jean-Francois Doué & Jean-Michel Vallat (Fantasia Entertainment)		Action
Bouncing Bluster II	1990	Jean-Francois Doué & Jean-Michel Vallat	Toolbox	Action
Bridge 6.0	1989	Arthur Walsh & Roger Harnish	Artworx	Cards
Bubble Ghost	1988	ERE Informatique	Accolade	Action
BuGS (Centipede)	2021	Jeremy Rand		Arcade-port
California Games	1988	Designer Software (Jimmy Huey)	Epyx	Sports
Canal Meurtre	2022	Antoine Vignau & Olivier Zardini (Brutal Deluxe)		Adventure
Captain Blood	1989	ERE Informatique (Alexis Martial & Jean-Michel Jarre)	Mindscape	Simulation/adventure
Carte Primus	1989	David Manthey		Cards
Castle Arms	1992	Tom Gooding		
Catacombs	1991	John Carmack & Tom Hall	Softdisk	Action-adventure
Cavern Cobra	1987	Greg Hale	PBI Software	Shoot 'em up
Chessmaster 2100, The Fidelity	1988	Troy Heere & Mark Manyen	Software Toolworks	Board
Cimetière des Ocelots (le)	2026	Antoine Vignau & Olivier Zardini (Brutal Deluxe)		Adventure
Club Backgammon	1988	Logical Design Works	California Dreams	Board
Cogito	1993	Antoine Vignau & Olivier Zardini (Brutal Deluxe)		Puzzle
Columns	1991	Kenrick Mock (Sound Barrier Systems)		Puzzle
Copy Killers	1989	Brian Greenstone & Dave Triplett	Pangea Software	
Cosmocade	1990	Brian Greenstone, Dave Triplett & Gene Koh	Pangea Software	Action
Cribbage King / Gin King	1990	Mark Manyen	Software Toolworks	Cards
Cryllan Mission 2088	1989	Vinay Pai, Vivek Pai & Vijay Pai	Victory Software	RPG
Cryllan Mission 2088: The Second Scenario	1990	Vinay Pai, Vivek Pai & Vijay Pai	Victory Software	RPG
Crystal Quest	1989	Rebecca Heineman	Cassidy & Greene	Action
Dark Castle	1989	Lane Roath	Three Sixty	Action
Dark Designs I	1990	John Carmack	Softdisk	RPG
Dark Designs II: Closing the Gate	1990	John Carmack	Softdisk	RPG
Dark Designs III: Retribution!	1990	John Carmack	Softdisk	RPG
Defender of the Crown	1989	Manley & Associates	Cinemaware	Action/strategy
Deja Vu: A Nightmare Comes True	1988	ICOM Simulations	Mindscape	Adventure
Deja Vu II: Lost in Las Vegas	1989	ICOM Simulations	Mindscape	Adventure
Destroyer	1987	Michael Kosaka & Chuck Sommerville	Epyx	Simulation
Doom	2026	Webifi		First-person shooter
Downhill Challenge	1989	Microids	Broderbund	Sports
Dr. Mario	1992	Blue Adept (USAlliance)		Puzzle
Dragon Wars	1990	Rebecca Heineman	Interplay Productions	RPG
Dragon's Lair	2022	Antoine Vignau & Olivier Zardini (Brutal Deluxe)		Arcade-port
Dragon's Lair: Escape from Singe's Castle	2022	Antoine Vignau & Olivier Zardini (Brutal Deluxe)		Arcade-port
Dragon's Lair II: Time Warp	2022	Antoine Vignau & Olivier Zardini (Brutal Deluxe)		Arcade-port
Dragon's Lair III: The Curse of Mordread	2022	Antoine Vignau & Olivier Zardini (Brutal Deluxe)		Arcade-port
Dream Zone	1988	Naughty Dog (Andy Gavin & Jason Rubin)	Baudville	Adventure
DuelTris	1992	Steven Chiang, Dave Seah & James Brookes	DreamWorld	Puzzle
Dungeon Master	1989	Don Jordan	FTL	RPG
DuoTris	1992	Richard Wifall & James Brookes (GS<>IRC)		Puzzle
Egérie, L'	2022	Antoine Vignau & Olivier Zardini (Brutal Deluxe)		Adventure
ExplorerGS	1991	Jason Smart		RPG
F1 Race	1988	Joel Quejada		Racing
Fast Break	1989	Greg Hospelhorn & George Wong	Accolade	Sports
Final Assault	1988	Infogrames	Epyx	Simulation
Firepower	1989	Stephen Lepisto	MicroIllusions	Action
Full Metal Planete	1993	Brainstorm Software (Francois Uhrich & Nicolas Bergeret)	Infogrames	Turn-based strategy
Fun Columns	1991	FTA (Olivier Goguel & Olivier Bailly-Maitre)	Toolbox	Puzzle
Futureshock 3D	1989	Jeff Johnson	Neeka Electronics	Action
Futuria	2026	Antoine Vignau & Olivier Zardini (Brutal Deluxe)		Adventure
GATE	1991	Bright Software (Joerg Kienzle, Yann Le Tensorer & Henrik Gudat)	Toolbox & Seven Hills	Action-adventure
Gauntlet	1988	Atari Games	Mindscape	Action
GBA Championship Basketball: Two on Two	1987	Gamestar (Paul Terry & Jack Thornton)	Activision	Sports
Gnarly Golf	1989	Visual Concepts (Jim Coliz Jnr & Darren Bartlett)	Britannica / Fanfare	Sports
Gold of the Americas	1991	Stephen Hart, Ian Trout & Allan Bell	Strategic Studies Group	Turn-based strategy
Gold Rush!	1989	Doug & Ken MacNeill	Sierra	Adventure
GS Adventure	2021	Peter Hirschberg		Action-adventure
GS Asteroids	2021	Peter Hirschberg		Arcade-port
GS Invaders	1994	David Ong-Tat-Wee		Action
GShisen	1998	Kelvin Sherlock		Board
Grackle	1989	Brian Greenstone	Pangea Software	Shoot 'em up
Grand Prix Circuit	1989	Distinctive Software	Accolade	Racing
Great Western Shootout	1989	Visual Concepts (Scott Patterson & Matt Crysdale)	Britannica / Fanfare	Action
Hacker II: The Doomsday Papers	1987	Steve Cartwright	Activision	Real-time strategy
Halls of Montezuma	1990	Roger Keating & Ian Trout	Strategic Studies Group	Turn-based strategy
HardBall!	1987	Distinctive Software (Dan Thompson)	Accolade	Sports
Hostage	1990	Infogrames	Mindscape	Action/strategy
Hover Blade	1991	Shiraz Akmal & Eric Boden	MCX	Action
Hunt for Red October	1989	John Brooks, Todd Daugherty & Alex Villagran	Software Toolworks	Simulation
Immortal, The	1990	Sandcastle (Will Harvey, Ian Nitchal & Doug Fulton)	Electronic Arts	Action RPG
Impossible Mission 2	1989	Novotrade	Epyx	Action
Jack Nicklaus' Greatest 18 Holes of Major Championship Golf	1989	Tony Manso	Accolade	Sports
Jigsaw!	1988	Huibert Aalbers & Javier Rullan Ruano	Britannica Software	Puzzle
John Elway's Quarterback	1989	Shadowmasters Design	Melbourne House	Sports
KABOOM!	2015	Ninjaforce		Action
Kaleidokubes	1989	Bob & Betsy Couch	Artworx	Puzzle
Keef the Thief	1989	Naughty Dog (Andy Gavin & Jason Rubin)	Electronic Arts	RPG
King of Chicago	1989	Doug Sharp	Cinemaware	Action/strategy
King's Quest: Quest for the Crown	1987	Roberta Williams	Sierra	Adventure
King's Quest II: Romancing the Throne	1988	Roberta Williams	Sierra	Adventure
King's Quest III: To Heir Is Human	1988	Roberta Williams	Sierra	Adventure
King's Quest IV: The Perils of Rosella	1989	Roberta Williams	Sierra	Adventure
LaserForce	1989	European Software Partner	Britannica / Fanfare	Action
Last Ninja, The	1988	System 3	Activision	Action-adventure
Legend of the Star Axe	1990	Heads on the Hills Software (Tom Hall, Kevin Kemmerly & Lane Roath)	Softdisk	Shoot 'em up
Leisure Suit Larry in the Land of the Lounge Lizards	1987	Al Lowe	Sierra	Adventure
Lemmings	1996	Antoine Vignau & Olivier Zardini (Brutal Deluxe)		Puzzle
LetterSlide	1992	Kenrick Mock (Sound Barrier Systems)		Board
Life & Death	1989	Mark Manyen & Jacob P. Smith	Software Toolworks	Simulation
Lode Runner	2025	Antoine Vignau & Olivier Zardini (Brutal Deluxe)		Puzzle-platform
Lost Treasures of Infocom, The	1993	Mike Howard & John Wrenholt	Big Red Computer Club	Interactive fiction
Lost Tribe, The	1992	Steve Vance, Frank Andrews & Todd Harris	Lawrence Productions	Adventure/strategy
Mad Match	1989	Paul Gauthier	Baudville	Board
Mancala	1988	Logical Design Works	California Dreams	Board
Manhunter: New York	1988	Dave, Barry and Dee Dee Murray	Sierra	Adventure
Marble Madness	1988	Will Harvey	Electronic Arts	Arcade-port
Mazer II	1992	Farfetch Software	Big Red Computer Club	Action RPG
Mean 18	1987	Mark Lesser & Micro Smiths	Accolade	Sports
Mighty Marvel Vs the Forces of E.V.I.L.	1988	Winchell Chung	ISM	RPG
Milestones 2000	1990	Ken Franklin		Cards
Mini-Putt	1988	Ross Salas & Tanager Software Productions	Accolade	Sports
Mixed Up Mother Goose	1988	Roberta Williams	Sierra	Adventure
Monte Carlo	1987	Richard Seaborne & Jeff Lefferts	PBI Software	Gambling
MontezumaGS	2026	Riad Megueddem		Action-adventure
Ms. Pac-Man GS	2026	Jawaid Bazyar		Arcade-port
NES: Balloon Fight	2025	Lucas Scharenbroich		Nintendo-port
NES: Contra	2026	Lucas Scharenbroich		Nintendo-port
NES: Donkey Kong	2025	Lucas Scharenbroich		Nintendo-port
NES: Duck Hunt	2026	Lucas Scharenbroich		Nintendo-port
NES: Excite Bike	2025	Lucas Scharenbroich		Nintendo-port
NES: Ghosts 'n Goblins	2026	Michele Di Paola		Nintendo-port
NES: Ice Climber	2025	Lucas Scharenbroich		Nintendo-port
NES: Legend of Zelda	2026	Lucas Scharenbroich		Nintendo-port
NES: Lights Out	2025	Lucas Scharenbroich		Nintendo-port
NES: Mario Bros.	2026	Lucas Scharenbroich		Nintendo-port
NES: Super Mario Bros.	2023	Lucas Scharenbroich		Nintendo-port
NES: Tetris (Tangen)	2026	Lucas Scharenbroich		Nintendo-port
NES: Wumpus	2025	Lucas Scharenbroich		Nintendo-port
Neuromancer	1989	Rebecca Heineman	Interplay Productions	Adventure
Night Driver	2021	Ian Schmidt & Fatdog Projects		Arcade-port
Omega	1990	Micro Magic	Origin	Simulation
One Arm Battle	1990	Ken Franklin		Gambling
Operation Lambda	1996	Bret Victor (Right Triangle Production)		Puzzle
Orbizone	1989	Brian Greenstone & Dave Triplett	Pangea Software	Action
Orphée, voyage aux enfers	2026	Antoine Vignau & Olivier Zardini (Brutal Deluxe)		Adventure
Out of this World (aka Another World)	1992	Rebecca Heineman	Interplay Productions	Action-adventure
Panzer Battles	1991	Roger Keating, Danny Stevens & Ian Trout	Strategic Studies Group	Turn-based strategy
Paperboy	1988	Atari Games	Mindscape	Action
Passagers du vent (les)	2021	Antoine Vignau & Olivier Zardini (Brutal Deluxe)		Adventure
Passagers du vent II (les)	2022	Antoine Vignau & Olivier Zardini (Brutal Deluxe)		Adventure
Pente	1993	Kenrick Mock (Sound Barrier Systems)		Puzzle
Pick 'n Pile	1992	Atreid Concept	Procyon	Puzzle
Pipe Dream	1990	Visual Concepts	Lucasfilm Games	Puzzle
Pirates!	1988	Ed Magnin	Microprose	Action/strategy
Pitfall! GS	2026	Dagen Brock		Action-adventure
Plunder!	1990	Ken Franklin		Board
Plotting	1991	Once Product (Philippe Leclercq)		Arcade-port
Police Quest	1987	Jim Walls	Sierra	Adventure
Puyo Puyo	1995	Bret Victor (Right Triangle Production)		Puzzle
Qix	1990	Ryan Ridges & John Lund	Taito America	Arcade-port
Quadronome	1989	Brian Greenstone & Dave Triplett	Pangea Software	Action
Quest for the Hoard	1991	Ken Burtch (Pegasoft)		Puzzle
Quest for the Hoard II: Treasures from Heaven	1993	Ken Burtch (Pegasoft)		Puzzle
Questmaster I	1990	Sean Barger	Miles Computing	Adventure
Questron II	1988	Westwood	Strategic Simulations	RPG
Rastan	1990	John Brooks	Taito America	Arcade-port
Reach for the Stars	1988	Roger Keating & Ian Trout	Strategic Studies Group	Turn-based strategy
Rescue Rover	1993	Rebecca Heineman & Adrian Carmack	Softdisk	Puzzle
Retour du Dr Genius (Le)	2024	Antoine Vignau & Olivier Zardini (Brutal Deluxe)		Adventure
Revolution '76	1989	Edward and Patricia Bever	Britannica Software	Turn-based strategy
Roadwar 2000	1987	Westwood	Strategic Simulations	Turn-based strategy
Rocket Ranger	1989	Ed Magnin	Cinemaware	Action-Adventure
Sea Strike	1987	Richard Seaborne & Jeff Lefferts	PBI Software	Shoot 'em up
Secret d'Anubis (le)	2025	Antoine Vignau & Olivier Zardini (Brutal Deluxe)		Adventure
Secrets of Bharas, The	1991	Vinay Pai, Vivek Pai & Vijay Pai	Victory Software	RPG
Sensei	1991	Phil Rivipellio, Walt Scapela & Neil Pulcadesso (Miami Software)		Fighting
Senseless Violence 1: Survival of the Fetus	1989	Brian Greenstone & Dave Triplett	Pangea Software	Action
Senseless Violence 2: You Use, You Die	1990	Brian Greenstone & Gene Koh	Pangea Software	Action
Serve & Volley	1988	Jeffrey Sigler	Accolade	Sports
Shadowgate	1988	ICOM Simulations	Mindscape	Adventure
Shanghai	1987	Manley & Associates (Brodie Lockard & Ivan Manley)	Activision	Board
Shanghai II: Dragon's Eye	1993	John Wrenholt & Steve Luellman	Big Red Computer Club	Board
Silent Service	1987	Ed Magnin	Microprose	Simulation
Silpheed	1989	Game Arts	Sierra	Action
Sinbad and the Throne of the Falcon	1990	Jim Simmons & Andrew Caldwell	Cinemaware	Action-Adventure
Sinistar	2026	Uraniumgun		Arcade-port
Skate or Die!	1988	David Bunch, Michael Kosaka & Michelle Shelfer	Electronic Arts	
Solarian	1992	David Tolson		Shoot 'em up
Solitaire & Cribbage	1990		Computrek Software	Cards
Solitaire Royale	1990	Jake Hoelter, Jody Sather & Brad Fregger	Spectrum Holobyte	Cards
Son of Star Axe	1992	Jay Jennings & Jerry Jones	Softdisk	Shoot 'em up
Space Ace	1990	David Foster & Simon Douglas	Ready Soft	Arcade-port
Space Ace (re-issue)	2022	Antoine Vignau & Olivier Zardini (Brutal Deluxe)		Arcade-port
Space Ace II: Borf's Revenge	2022	Antoine Vignau & Olivier Zardini (Brutal Deluxe)		Arcade-port
Space Cluster	1990	Pascal Watel, Olivier Philipp & Claude Pélisson (Miami Software)		Shoot 'em up
Space Quest I: The Sarien Encounter	1987	Scott Murphy & Mark Crowe	Sierra	Adventure
Space Quest II: Vohaul's Revenge	1988	Scott Murphy & Mark Crowe	Sierra	Adventure
Space Shark	1990	Miami Software	Toolbox	Shoot 'em up
Spacefox	1992	Bright Software (Joerg Kienzle & Yann Le Tensorer)	Toolbox & Seven Hills	Action
Spirit of Excalibur	1991	Synergistic Software	Virgin Mastertronic	RPG
Spy Hunter	1993	Shane Richards		Action
Stalactites	1994	Rebecca Heineman	Software Gremlins	Action
Star Saga One: Beyond the Boundary	1988	Richard Dutton, Walter Freitag, Andrew Greenberg, Michael Massimilla	Master Play	RPG
Star Saga: Two - The Clathran Menace	1988	Richard Dutton, Walter Freitag, A. & S. Greenberg, Michael Massimilla, Gerald Seixas	Master Play	RPG
Star Trek Classic	1991	Joe Jaworski		Real-time strategy
Street Sports Soccer	1988	Designer Software	Epyx	Sports
Strip Poker II	1987	Roger Harnish	Artworx	Gambling
Sub Battle Simulator	1987	Rob Brannon & Kelly Fergason	Epyx	Simulation
SubVersion	1992	Al Griest & Jason Harper	Point of View Computing	Turn-based strategy
Superstar Ice Hockey	1988	DesignStar Consultants (Andrew Caldwell)	Mindscape	Sports
Tarot	1990	François Uhrich & Jean-François Sauvage	Toolbox	Cards
Task Force	1990	Visual Concepts (Scott Patterson & Matt Crysdale)	Britannica / Fanfare	Action
Tass Times in Tonetown	1986	Rebecca Heineman (Interplay Productions & Brainwave Creations)	Activision	Adventure
Test Drive II: The Duel	1989	Distinctive Software	Accolade	Racing
Tetris	1988	Roland Gustafsson, Sean Barger & Dan Geisler	Spectrum Holobyte	Puzzle
Tetrotrix	1990	Pierre Abel		Puzzle
Time Pilot	2024	Stefan Wessels		Action
Thexder	1987	Game Arts	Sierra	Action
Third Courier, The	1989	Manley & Associates	Accolade	Adventure/RPG
Three Stooges, The	1990	Ed Magnin	Cinemaware	Action-Adventure
Tinies, The	1994	Antoine Vignau & Olivier Zardini (Brutal Deluxe)		Puzzle
Tomahawk	1988	John Brooks	Datasoft	Flight simulator
Tout a disparu	2023	Antoine Vignau & Olivier Zardini (Brutal Deluxe)		Interactive fiction
Tower of Myraglen	1987	Richard Seaborne & Jeff Lefferts	PBI Software	Action RPG
Transylvania III	1990	Antonio Antiochia & Veronika Slintak	Polarware	Adventure
Triango	1988	Logical Design Works	California Dreams	Board
Tunnels of Armageddon	1990	Logical Design Works	California Dreams	Action
Ultima I: The First Age of Darkness	1992	Rebecca Heineman	Vitesse	RPG
Uninvited	1988	ICOM Simulations	Mindscape	Adventure
Utopia	2026	Antoine Vignau & Olivier Zardini (Brutal Deluxe)		Adventure
Vegas Craps	1988	Logical Design Works	California Dreams	Gambling
Vegas Gambler	1988	Logical Design Works	California Dreams	Gambling
VIAD	1992	Kenrick Mock & James Brookes (Sound Barrier Systems)		Puzzle
War in Middle Earth	1989	Synergistic Software	Melbourne House	Real-time strategy
Warlock	1988	ERE Informatique	Three Sixty	Action
Wheel of Fortune	1988	Edward Rambeau		Trivia/puzzle
Where in the World is Carmen Sandiego?	1989	Loring Vogel	Broderbund	Educational
Where in the USA is Carmen Sandiego?	1990	Sculptured Software (Peter Adams)	Broderbund	Educational
Windwalker	1990	Greg Malone	Origin	RPG
Winter Games	1987	Westwood & IT	Epyx	Sports
Wolfenstein 3D	1998	Rebecca Heineman, Eric Shepherd & NinjaForce	Logicware	First-person shooter
World Games	1987	Westwood & IT	Epyx	Sports
World Tour Golf	1987	John Selhorst & Tanager Software Productions	Electronic Arts	Sports
Xenocide	1989	Pangea Software	Micro Revelations	Action
Zany Golf	1988	Sandcastle (Will Harvey, Ian Nitchal & Doug Fulton)	Electronic Arts	Sports
Zappa Roidz	1989	Ideas From the Deep (Lane Roath & John Romero)	Softdisk	Shoot 'em up

== Unreleased games ==
This section lists games that were never completed or officially released.

There are currently 76 unfinished games on this list. This number is always up to date by this script.

Title	Year	Developer/planned publisher	Exists ?	Notes
1942	1998	Brutal Deluxe	Yes	Incomplete - rudimentary scrolling, player sprite only
3-D Helicopter Simulator	1988	Sierra	Unverified	Reported in development
Attack of the PETSCII Robots	2021	The 8-Bit Guy (8-Bit Productions, LLC)	Yes	Game coding only 15% complete; GS-specific graphics created. Development halted.
Barbarian	1988	Melbourne House	Unverified	Reported in development in 1988
Bard's Tale III: Thief of Fate	1990	Rebecca Heineman / Interplay Productions	Unverified	Programmer claimed "was almost complete" (primarily missing graphics)
Blue Angels	1989	Accolade	Yes	Incomplete - missing features, crashes
Blue Helmet	1992	FTA	Yes	Incomplete - rudemtary sprites/scrolling
Bouncin' Ferno	1991	FTA	Yes	Incomplete -
Bubble Bobble	1988	Taito America	Unverified	Advertised available by Taito
Catacomb Abyss 3D	1993	Rebecca Heineman / Softdisk	Yes	Fully playable; audio not present?
Clue: Master Detective	1989	Mastertronic	Unverified	Reported in development at 1989 CES
Colonel's Bequest	1989	Sierra	Unverified	Reported in development at 1989 CES
Conspiracy: The Deadlock Files	1989	Accolade	Unverified	Reported in development at 1989 CES
Defender of the World	1993	David Ong Tat-Wee	Yes	Incomplete - only first level playable
Deluxe Tetris	1991	Scot Simpson / Jah Software	Unverified	Claimed game "complete and fully tested". May have seen limited distribution; Demo exists.
Diamonds	1996	Richard Bennett, Sean Craig & Alex Lee	Yes	Playable, 99% complete
Don't Go Alone	1989	Accolade	Unverified	Reported in development at 1989 CES
Double Dragon II	1989	Mastertronic	Unverified	Reported in development at 1989 CES
Dragon's Lair	1990	Ready Soft	Unverified	Reported in development. Prototype version spanning 16 floppy disks, used greyscale
Dragon's Lair: Escape from Singe's Castle	1991	Ready Soft	Unverified	Reports it was completed. Manual from other ports have IIGS loading instructions.
Dragon's Lair II: Time Warp	1992	Ready Soft	Unverified	Reports it was completed. Manual from other ports have IIGS loading instructions.
Faery Tale Adventure	1988	MicroIllusions	Unverified	Reported in development
Final Destination	1990	Pangea Software	Unverified	Was to be included with Cosmocade; canceled due to being incomplete
Flintstones	1989	MicroIllusions	Unverified	Reported in development at 1989 CES
Greg Norman's Ultimate Golf	1989	Mastertronics	Unverified	Reported in development at 1989 CES
GS Pac-Man	2021	Peter Hirschberg	Yes	Multiple bugs, poor audio; missing attract-mode and intermission cut-scenes
Hardball II	1989	Accolade	Unverified	Reported in development at 1989 CES
Heat Wave	1989	Accolade	Unverified	Reported in development at 1989 CES
Ishido	1989	Epyx	Unverified	Reported in development at 1989 CES
It Came from the Desert	1989	Cinemaware	Unverified	Reported in development at 1989 CES
Jigsaw Deluxe	1989	Britannica Software	Yes	Complete; missing new puzzle art
Leisure Suit Larry Goes Looking for Love	1988	Sierra	Unverified	Reported in development in 1988
Lode Runner	1989	ACS	Yes	Incomplete - no collision detection, missing sound effects
Lords of the Rising Sun	1989	Cinemaware (Ed Magnin & Ivan Manley)	Unverified	Reported in development in 1988
Magic Johnson's Basketball	1989	Synergistic Software / Melbourne House	Yes	Finished - fully playable (beta version, bugs)
Manhunter San Francisco	1989	Sierra	Unverified	Reported in development
Le Manor de Mortville	1989	Second Sight Software	Yes	
Miami Vice	1989	Intracorp	Unverified	Reported in development at 1989 CES
Mindshadow	1993	Rebecca Heineman / Interplay	Yes	Early-stage port using 8-bit version as framework (missing GUI, sound or enhanced graphics)
Mini-Prix	1990	FTA	Yes	Playable - pre-release beta version, bugs
Monopoly	1989	Mastertronics	Unverified	Reported in development at 1989 CES
Oil Landers	1992	FTA	Yes	Incomplete
Opale	1993	Brutal Deluxe	Yes	Incomplete, preview demo released
Operation Wolf	1989	Taito America	Unverified	Reported in development at 1989 CES
Passengers on the Wind	1988	Ordigrames / Infogrames	Yes	
Pinball Wizard	1988	ERE Informatique / Accolade	Yes	Incomplete - game engine not fully complete, design bugs. Playable.
Police Quest II: The Vengeance	1988	Sierra	Unverified	Reported in development in 1988
Pool of Radiance	1989	Strategic Simulations Inc	Unverified	Reported in development at 1989 CES
Project Neptune	1989	Infogrames / Epyx	Yes	Incomplete
Purple Saturn Day	1989	Infogrames / Epyx	Unverified	Reported in development at 1989 CES
Puzznic	1990	Ryan Ridges & John Lund / Taito America	Yes	Finished - fully playable (unpublished due to Taito America closure)
Ragnarok		DreamWorld	Unverified	Reported in development. Actual screen shot exists.
Renegade	1988	Taito America	Unverified	Reported in development at 1989 CES. Advertised available by Taito. Actual screen shots exist.
Return to Castle Wolfenstein	1992	Martin Hill	Yes	Incomplete - basic game engine only, no enemy AI or finished levels
Rick Dangerous	2019	Jason Anderson	Yes	Playable, sound engine needs work (low quality); bugs
Runaway Robots	1988	Tomoo Yoshiya / PBI Software	Yes	
S.D.I.	1988	Cinemaware	Unverified	Reported in development. Actual screen shots exist.
Scooby Doo	1990	MicroIllusions	Unverified	Reported in development
Sherlock: The Riddle of the Crown Jewels	1988	Infocom	Unverified	Reported in development
Shufflepuck Cafe	1990	Christopher Gross / Broderbund	Yes	Finished - fully playable
SimCity	1994	Rebecca Heineman	Yes	Incomplete - rudimentary menus, scrolling, displays
Space Ace II: Borf's Revenge	1991	ReadySoft	Unverified	Reports it was completed. Manual from other ports have IIGS loading instructions.
Space Harrier	1989	FTA	Yes	Incomplete - no collision detection, sound effects, or ability to complete first level
Space Quest III: The Pirates of Pestulon	1988	Sierra	Unverified	Reported in development in 1988
Star Command	1993	Joseph lee	Yes	Incomplete - basic game engine
Star Wizard	1989	Sergeant Claude / Antic's	Yes	Playable - pre-release beta version, bugs
Super Mario Bros.	1997	Lucas Scharenbroich	Yes	Incomplete - missing levels and audio. Playable.
Sword of Sodan	1989	Visual Concepts / Discovery Software	Yes	Incomplete - 5/11 levels missing enemy sprites-obstacles. Playable version shown at 1989 CES.
Teenage Queen	1990	Miami Software / Infogrames	Yes	Finished - fully playable
TimeLord	1992	Dreamworld (Chris McKinsey & Donald McIntosh)	Yes	Incomplete - lacks audio, unfinished map locations and story
Ultima V	1988	Richard Garriot / Origin Systems	Unverified	Reported in development by Origin staff
Ultima VI	1990	Richard Garriot / Origin Systems	Unverified	Claimed preliminary work started. IIGS version mentioned on box and manual of ports.
UMS 2 - Nations at War	1990	Microplay	Unverified	Reported programmed by developer. Manual from other ports have IIGS loading instructions.
Vindicators	1989	Tengen / Atari Games	Yes	Finished - fully playable (beta-version, bugs)
Wings of Fury		Robin Kar & Matt Crysdale / Broderbund	Unverified	Reported in development
Wonder Bulla in Terrific Land		FTA	Yes	Incomplete - no collision detection or audio. Unfinished levels.

== See also ==
- List of Apple II games
- Lists of video games
