= SportsTalk Live =

SportsTalk Live may refer to

- An American TV series in California, SportsTalk Live (NBC Sports Bay Area)
- The TV series of the same name on NBC Sports Washington
- The TV series of the same name on NBC Sports Chicago
  - The related podcast in Chicago, SportsTalk Live Podcast

== See also ==
- NBC SportsTalk, a daily U.S. show on NBCSN
- Talksport, a UK radio station
