= Card Shark (disambiguation) =

A card shark is a person who uses skill and/or deception to win card games.

Card Shark(s) can also refer to:

- Card Shark, a 2022 video game
- Card Sharks, a television game show
- Card Sharks (video game), a 1987 computer game
- Card Sharks (anthology), a 1993 book in the Wild Cards science fiction series
