= Eradicator =

The term Eradicator can mean the following:

- Eradicator (Algerian politics), a paramilitary group during the Algerian Civil War
- Eradicator (comics), a superhero/supervillain in the DC Comics universe
- Eradicator (video game), released by Accolade in 1996
- The Eradicator, a ski-mask wearing squash player appearing in a Kids in the Hall sketch, played by Bruce McCulloch.
