= Apollo 18 =

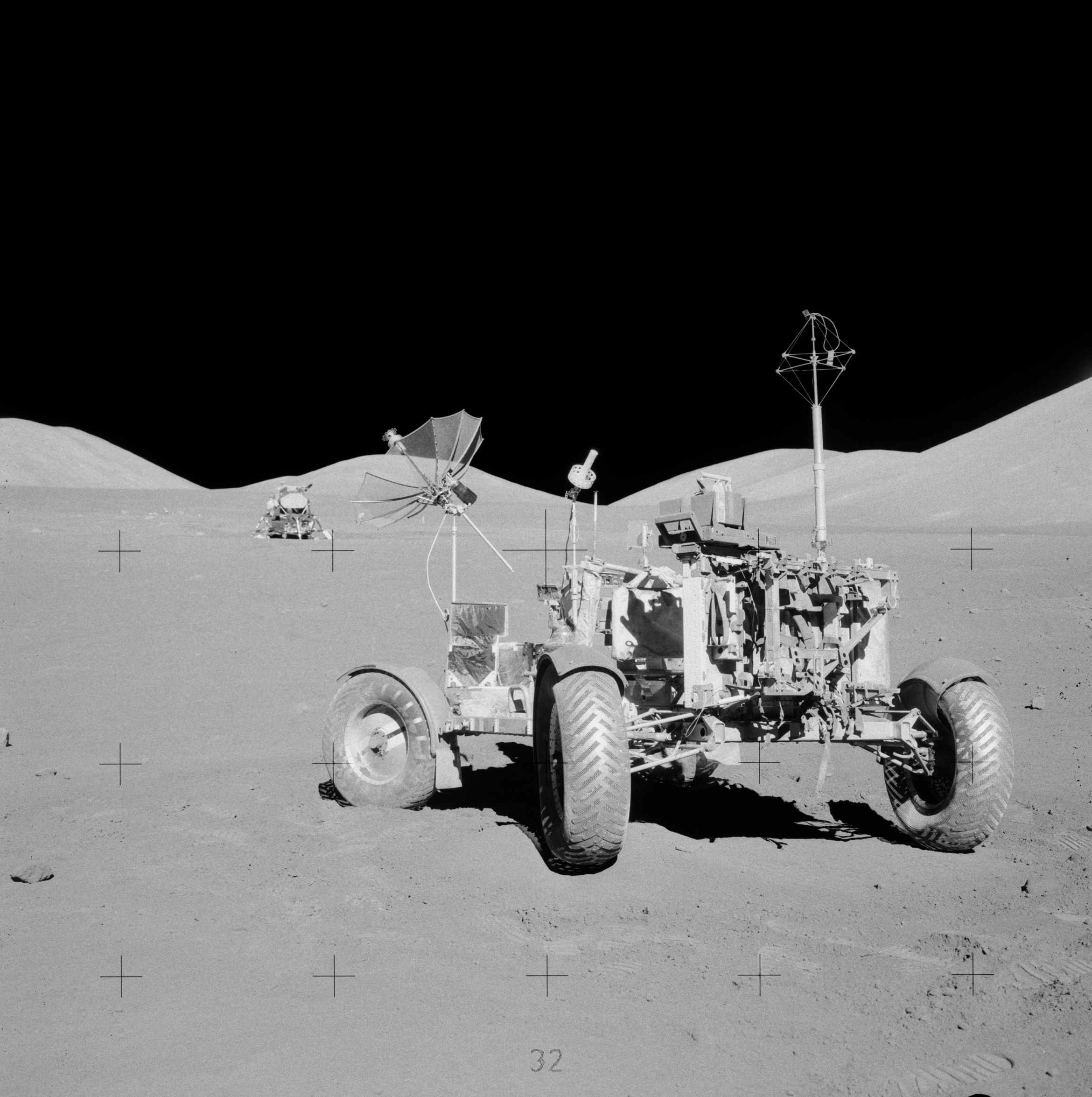
LRV near LM Rosemary

Apollo 18 may refer to:

- One of the canceled Apollo missions of the American Apollo lunar program of the 1960s and 1970s
- The officially unnumbered Apollo spacecraft used in the 1975 Apollo–Soyuz Test Project
- The fictional Apollo 18 mission in James Michener's 1982 novel Space
- The fictional Apollo 18 mission in the 2024 TV series Constellation on Apple TV+
- Apollo 18: Mission to the Moon, a 1988 video game by Accolade
- Apollo 18 (album), a 1992 album by They Might Be Giants
- Apollo 18 (band), a Korean indie rock trio, formed in 2008
- Apollo 18 (film), a 2011 horror film directed by Gonzalo López-Gallego
