= Mystery at the Museums =

1993 video game

- Developer: Binary Zoo Software
- Publisher: Artech Studios
- Designers: Rick Banks; Paul Butler
- Platform: MS-DOS
- Release: 1993
- Genre: Educational
- Mode: Single-player

Mystery at the Museums is an educational video game developed by Binary Zoo Software and published by Artech Studios for MS-DOS in 1993. The game is Binary Zoo's second release as well as the second in their Adventures With Edison series.

== Gameplay ==
The objective of Mystery at the Museums is to find all of the artifacts that have gone missing from the Smithsonian Museum before an inspector comes to visit at 10:00am the next morning. The artifacts have been scattered throughout the different Smithsonian museums, and the player must visit each of these museums and solve puzzles in order to get the artifacts back. The puzzles are all derived from popular existing puzzles, like cube folding puzzles, sliding puzzles, or Tetris puzzles, but have a museum theme and give information about various museums as the puzzles are solved. When the player correctly solves the puzzle, if there was an artifact there, the game will cut back to the curator's office and Edison will inform the curator that he has found an artifact. If there was no artifact to be found, the player will be taken back to the map screen and will have to choose another area to search. When the player has found all of the artifacts, he must then complete a maze in order to find out why all of the artifacts went missing in the first place.

== Development ==
Mystery at the Museums is the second program developed by Binary Zoo Software as well as the second in its Adventures with Edison series, which includes Wild Science Arcade and Rock and Bach Studio. It includes several unique features that few games at the time had including the ability to customize what the main character looks like as well as the ability to customize levels.

== Reception ==
Reception

Review score
Publication	Score
Abandonia	4.0 out of 5

Mystery at the Museums was reviewed in the Oppenheim Toy Portfolio Guide Book where the authors assessed the difficulty as falling within the 7 year old and older child.
