= Patriot (video game) =

1993 video game

- Developer: Artech Digital Entertainment
- Publisher: Three-Sixty Pacific
- Designers: Rick Banks; Frank Chadwick
- Platform: MS-DOS
- Release: 1993
- Genre: Wargame
- Mode: Single-player

Patriot is a computer wargame about the Gulf War, developed by Artech Digital Entertainment and published by Three-Sixty Pacific. It was released in 1993 for MS-DOS. The player can command either the Iraqi or Coalition forces.

== Reception ==
Computer Gaming World's April 1993 review began:

QUESTION: What do Patriot and The Satanic Verses have in common? ANSWER: In both cases, the end-users want to kill the author.

The reviewer, who participated in the Gulf War and was also an experienced wargamer and computer wargamer, stated that "Based on the program as released, I could not begin to figure out what to do or how to do it. Clearly, there is something wrong with this picture". He criticized the documentation, user interface, unrealistic unit strength, and lack of options such as military intelligence, logistics, or most close air support. The reviewer stated that Patriot was "the first civilian wargame ever published which could be used immediately in the military for a CPX (Command Post Exercise). And this is part of the problem"; while with many novel features, he wrote; "the lack of a meaningful game dooms the remainder to oblivion".

When evaluating version 1.10 of Patriot in December 1993, the same reviewer noted improvements in the documentation, stability, and user interface. He stated that "this was a wargame straight out of Command & General Staff College or the War College. In fact, this remains Patriot's greatest strength and failure — it is simply too military. There is no feeling of action or vicarious thrill/terror ... it often is not fun". The reviewer recommended that "casual gamers" avoid it, advised that the game be "marketed to the defense establishment as a serious tool for decision-making", and suggested that it might assist students in military staff colleges with coursework.

In 1996, Computer Gaming World declared Patriot the 45th-worst computer game ever released.
