= Greg Papa =

American sportscaster (born 1962)

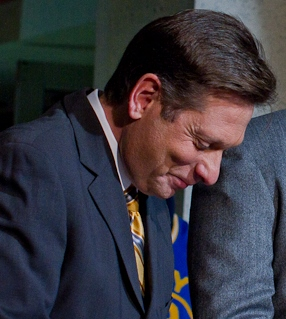
- Papa in 2012
- Born: Gregory Charles Papa; October 10, 1962 (age 64); Buffalo, New York, U.S.
- Education: Syracuse University
- Sports commentary career
- Teams: Indiana Pacers (1984–1986); Golden State Warriors (1986–1997); Oakland Athletics (1991–2003); San Antonio Spurs (1997–2000); Oakland Raiders (1997–2018); San Francisco Giants (2004–2008); San Francisco 49ers (2019–present)
- Genre: Play-by-play
- Sports: National Basketball Association; Major League Baseball; National Football League

Gregory Charles Papa (born October 10, 1962) is an American sportscaster, currently employed as the radio play-by-play announcer for the San Francisco 49ers. He has also broadcast for the Indiana Pacers, Golden State Warriors, Oakland Athletics, San Antonio Spurs, Oakland Raiders, and San Francisco Giants during his career.

He is best known as the radio play-by-play caller for the Raiders and the host of Chronicle Live on NBC Sports Bay Area. He, Garry St. Jean, and Kelenna Azubuike used to do the in-studio analysis for all the Golden State Warriors regular season games on NBC Sports Bay Area. He is the younger brother of deceased Philadelphia sportscaster Gary Papa. Papa is a three-time California Sportscaster of the Year Award winner.

== Career highlights ==
Papa graduated from Syracuse University's S. I. Newhouse School of Public Communications in 1984. While at Syracuse, he was the sports director and a play-by-play announcer for Syracuse Orange sports at WAER-FM. He was in the same 1984 Newhouse class as Sean McDonough and Tony Caridi.

Papa was a member of the Indiana Pacers' television and radio broadcasting team from 1984 to 1986. Then, he moved west and from 1986 to 1997, he was the radio announcer for the Golden State Warriors (including the famous "Sleepy Floyd Game," where Warrior Sleepy Floyd scored 51 points against the Lakers in a playoff game). From 1997 to 2000, Papa became the lead announcer on the San Antonio Spurs' telecasts. During this span, he was also the television play-by-play announcer for the Oakland Athletics with Ray Fosse from 1991 to 2003.

=== Oakland Raiders ===
Until his dismissal prior to the 2018 season, Papa was play-by-play announcer for the Raiders, alongside his color commentator, former Raider coach Tom Flores. The Raiders hired Papa for the 1997 season, replacing Joel Meyers, who had himself replaced King. His work was very much in the tradition of his predecessor, Bill King. Like King, his touchdown calls were punctuated by "TOUCHDOWN, RRRRAID-ERS!!!" Papa's best calls arguably were: Tyrone Wheatley's 26-yard run in the Raiders 1999 finale against the Kansas City Chiefs at Arrowhead Stadium ("Wheatley won't go down!!!") along with describing the events during the Tuck Rule game, when the Raiders seemingly had won a 2001 playoff game during a snow storm at New England after forcing a late fumble, only to see referee Walt Coleman reverse the call after consulting instant replay. The Patriots went on to win the historic, controversial contest in overtime.

Papa later speculated that he was let go by the Raiders for criticizing owner Mark Davis's decision to interview Mike Shanahan for the head coach position in 2015, as Shanahan, who previously coached the team from 1988 to 1989, had a "huge falling out" with Davis' father and previous owner Al Davis. Had Shanahan been hired, Papa had threatened to resign out of respect for Al Davis, and that allegedly led to a rift with Mark Davis.

=== Oakland Athletics ===
Greg Papa was also the television play-by-play announcer for the Oakland A's with Ray Fosse from 1991 to 2003.

=== San Francisco Giants ===
From 2004 to 2008, Papa called play-by-play for San Francisco Giants broadcasts on KTVU television and KNBR radio. In 2008, Papa hosted 35 of the 50 scheduled editions of "Giants Pregame Live" and all 65 of the "Giants Postgame Live" shows on Comcast SportsNet Bay Area. He occasionally announced several of the Giants' games on TV and radio when Jon Miller was on assignment at ESPN.

When Dave Flemming's microphone went dead when the ball was in the air for what turned out to be Barry Bonds' 715th career home run on May 28, 2006, Papa took over the broadcast, apologized to listeners, and explained what happened on the field.

Papa returned to baseball full-time for the 2021 season, hosting pregame and postgame coverage for the Giants, though this only lasted one season. Papa still remains as a substitute host for Giants Pre and Postgame Live.

=== Golden State Warriors ===
From the 2011–12 season until 2019–20, with a numerous rotation of analysts, Greg Papa has hosted both "Warriors Pregame Live" and "Warriors Postgame Live" on NBC Sports Bay Area. The duo also provide in studio analysis at half-time for the station's coverage of Warriors regular season (and 1st round playoff) games.

=== San Francisco 49ers ===
In 2018, Papa hosted 49ers pre- and postgame live on NBC Sports Bay Area, alongside Donte Whitner, Ian Williams, and Jeff Garcia.

Beginning with the 2019 season, Papa took over as the radio voice of the 49ers, handling the play-by-play duties for the team on KNBR 680 with analyst Tim Ryan. His touchdown calls are variations of Bill King. He punctuates a score with, “TOUCHDOWN, SAN-FRAN-CISCO!”

=== Other ===
Papa also does work for NBC Sports California, notably for broadcasts of the California Golden Bears football and basketball teams. He has also done San Jose Stealth and San Francisco Dragons lacrosse games. Papa is also formerly host of Chronicle Live, a nightly Bay Area sports talk show covering all Bay Area sports. He was also the play-by-play announcer for HardBall 6: 2000 Edition and some of his Oakland A's broadcast audio was in the 2011 film Moneyball.

In 2017, Papa began co-hosting The Happy Hour, a conversational discussion sports program on NBC Sports Bay Area, with sports anchor Kelli Johnson and media personality Ray Ratto. The Happy Hour was cancelled by NBC Sports Bay Area in 2018 with the last airing on December 21, 2018.

== Personal life ==
Papa resides in Marin County. His brother, Gary Papa, was a long time sportscaster for WPVI in Philadelphia. His other family members are associated with National Fire Adjustment Co., Inc; his grandfather Bernard founded the company in 1922 and father Frank (1926–2019) served as its longtime chairman.

On August 1, 2025, Papa announced that he had been diagnosed with cancer and would step away from his broadcast duties while recovering.
