= Tommo =

American video game publisher

Tommo Inc.
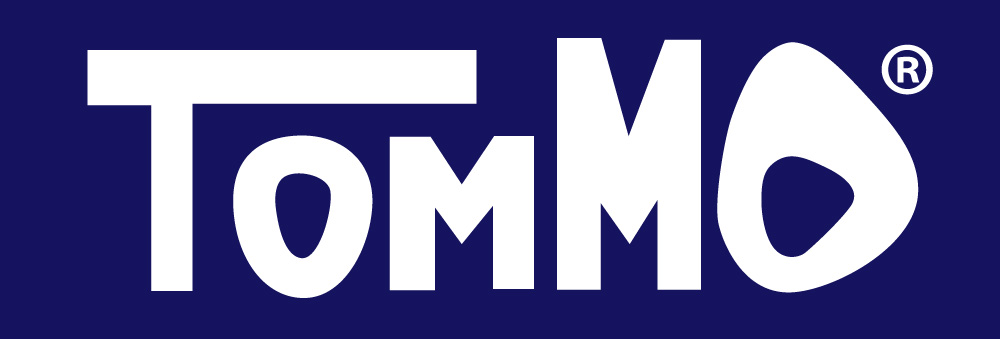
- Type: Private
- Industry: Video games
- Founded: 1990; 36 years ago
- Founder: Jonathan Wan
- Headquarters: City of Industry, California, US
- Key people: Jonathan Wan (CEO)
- Subsidiaries: UFO Interactive Games
- Website: tommo.com

Tommo Inc. is an American video game publisher based in City of Industry, California. Founded in 1990, Tommo started out as a small independent distributor of imported video games. Since 2006, Tommo also operates a publishing subsidiary, UFO Interactive Games, which is best known for publishing original games, such as several titles in the Raiden series.

== History ==
In July 2013, Tommo successfully placed a bid on a majority of assets held by Atari during the company's bankruptcy sale. The sale included assets related to Humongous Entertainment, GT Interactive, Accolade and over one-hundred titles.

In January 2014, Tommo relaunched the Humongous brand and began re-releasing the company's Junior Adventure titles onto Steam. In October 2014, in conjunction with Night Dive Studios, Tommo launched its Retroism publishing label, which specializes in the re-release of classic video game titles into digital distribution channels.

In 2017, Tommo began a partnership with Hong Kong–based investor and intellectual property management company Billionsoft. In the process, Tommo licensed out its Retroism titles over to them, alongside the brand names. Within the process, Billionsoft relaunched the Accolade label with the intention of producing new entries for ex-Accolade franchises, beginning with the Bubsy series.

In March 2020, newly-formed publisher Ziggurat Interactive purchased several of the ex-Atari titles from Tommo and Billionsoft.

On April 19, 2023, Atari re-purchased back over one-hundred titles held by the two companies, as well as the Accolade and GT Interactive brands.

== Games published ==
Year	Title	Platform(s)
2013	Challenge of the Five Realms	Microsoft Windows, OS X, Linux
2013	Command HQ	Microsoft Windows, OS X, Linux
2013	Dragonsphere	Microsoft Windows, OS X, Linux
2013	Darklands	Microsoft Windows, OS X, Linux
2013	Sid Meier's Colonization	Microsoft Windows, OS X, Linux
2013	Sid Meier's Covert Action	Microsoft Windows, OS X, Linux
2013	BloodNet	Microsoft Windows, OS X, Linux
2013	Silent Service	Microsoft Windows, OS X, Linux
2013	Silent Service II	Microsoft Windows, OS X, Linux
2013	The UnderGarden	Microsoft Windows
2013	Tycoon City: New York	Microsoft Windows
2013	Deadlock: Planetary Conquest	Microsoft Windows
2013	Deadlock II: Shrine Wars	Microsoft Windows
2013	Sid Meier's Pirates!	Microsoft Windows, OS X
2013	Pirates! Gold	Microsoft Windows, OS X, Linux
2013	7th Legion	Microsoft Windows
2013	Sword of the Samurai	Microsoft Windows, OS X, Linux
2013	Rex Nebular and the Cosmic Gender Bender	Microsoft Windows, OS X, Linux
2013	B-17 Flying Fortress: The Mighty 8th	Microsoft Windows
2013	Slave Zero	Microsoft Windows, Dreamcast
2013	Redline	Microsoft Windows
2013	F-117A Nighthawk Stealth Fighter 2.0a	Microsoft Windows
2013	1942: The Pacific Air War	Microsoft Windows, OS X, Linux
2013	Eradicator	Microsoft Windows, OS X, Linux
2013	Knights of the Sky	Microsoft Windows, Linux
2013	Fleet Defender	Microsoft Windows, Linux
2013	Hyperspeed	Microsoft Windows, OS X, Linux
2013	Shadow Ops: Red Mercury	Microsoft Windows
2015	Bubsy Two-Fur	Microsoft Windows
2017	Bubsy: The Woolies Strike Back	Microsoft Windows, PlayStation 4
2019	Bubsy: Paws on Fire!	Microsoft Windows, PlayStation 4, Nintendo Switch
