= Crystal's Pony Tale =

1994 children's video game

- Cover art
- Developer: Artech Studios
- Publisher: Sega
- Producer: Cindy Claveran
- Designers: Paul Butler; Rick Banks
- Programmers: Larry Donais; Dan Fanthome
- Artist: Grant Campbell
- Composer: Mark Mitchell
- Platform: Sega Genesis
- Release: NA: October 1994
- Genre: Action-adventure
- Mode: Single-player

Crystal's Pony Tale is a children's action-adventure game developed by Artech Studios and published by Sega for the Sega Genesis in 1994. The game features the adventures of protagonist Crystal Pony, who journeys to rescue her friends and stop an evil witch. It was created in hopes to attract little girls to the platform.

== Gameplay ==
The game has seven areas, each holding multiple secrets. There are three difficulties - easy, medium, and hard. There is a mixture of classical music and originals by the game's composer, Mark Mitchell, featured throughout the game; including Grieg, Faure and Brahms' 4th Symphony.

== Plot ==
The evil Storm Witch has cast a spell that imprisoned Crystal Pony's friends in her castle in order to rule Ponyland. The player's role is to collect crystals to free the ponies and defeat the witch once and for all, after which the ponies can live, finally, "happily ever after."

== Reception ==
Game Developer reported the game "was criticized for featuring too much pink in its graphics."
