= U.F.O.s (video game) =

1997 computer game

- Windows cover art
- Developer: Artech Digital Entertainment
- Publishers: Corel Corporation; Hoffmann + Associates
- Platforms: Macintosh, Windows
- Release: 1997
- Genre: Adventure
- Mode: Single-player

U.F.O.s is a 1997 adventure video game developed by Artech Digital Entertainment and published by Corel Corporation and Hoffmann + Associates on Macintosh and Windows.

== Plot and gameplay ==
The player character is an alien named "Gnap", who gets stranded on Earth due to his spaceship crash landing. Now he must find and repair his wrecked ship so he can return home.

The game is a comic adventure with themes aimed at a mature audience.

== Production ==
The game was localised by ARI Data CD in Germany (1997), AIM Productions in Belgium (1998), and Akella in Russia (1998).

== Reception ==
Tap Repeatedly felt it would be enjoyable only to adventure game fans. Metzomagic deemed the game amusing in a tasteless and offensive manner. Just Adventure compared the game's humour to that of Ren and Stimpy. Adventure archiv praised the cartoon-style graphics. Gambler felt it was a decent video game considering its limited budget. U.F.Os reminded Quandaryland of the video game Stupid Invaders.
