= Trivial Pursuit: Unhinged =

2004 video game

- Developer: Artech Studios
- Publisher: Atari Interactive
- Engine: RenderWare
- Platforms: PlayStation 2, Xbox, Windows
- Release: PlayStation 2, Xbox: NA: March 26, 2004; PAL: October 29, 2004 (PS2); Windows: NA: April 28, 2004; PAL: October 22, 2004
- Genres: Digital tabletop, quiz
- Modes: Single-player, multiplayer

Trivial Pursuit: Unhinged is a video game developed by Artech Studios and published by Atari Interactive based on the trivia board game of the same name. It was released in 2004 for the PlayStation 2, Xbox and Microsoft Windows.

The game supported online multiplayer. The Xbox version was supported online until the termination of Xbox Live for original Xbox games in 2010. Trivial Pursuit: Unhinged is supported on the revival online servers for the Xbox called Insignia.

== Game Modes ==
=== Classic Mode ===
This mode is played exactly like the original board game. Players take turns moving their pieces around the Trivial Pursuit board answering questions in six different categories of people & places (blue), arts & entertainment (pink), history (yellow), science & nature (brown), sports & leisure (green), & wild card (orange) to win one differently colored "pie piece" in each category. The first player to collect all six "pie pieces" and answer a randomly selected question in the game board's hub is the winner.

=== Unhinged ===
The titular Unhinged mode is a variation of Classic mode where players can bet on their opponents' game performance and certain spaces on the game board are given different properties including:

- Teleport - allows a player to move their playing piece anywhere on the board
- 50/50 - removes two incorrect answers from your four multiple choice answers
- Rotate - spins the board and moves all players to new positions
- Recycle - allows the player to swap their initial trivia question
Reception

Review scores
Publication	Score
GameSpot	4.7/10
GameSpy	2/5
IGN	7/10
TeamXbox	7.8/10

=== Flash ===
This is a quick two-player mode in which each player starts at the bottom of a tower and chooses a question in one of two random categories, each correct answer brings the player up a tier on the tower. The first player to the top is declared the winner.

== Development ==
Atari announced the game on August 15, 2003 for a release during the Christmas season. However, the game would miss this release window, and was instead released in March 2004. A European release was announced for a March 2004 release in November 2003, but this was delayed until October, with the Xbox version eventually being canceled in Europe.
