= Aces of the Galaxy =

2008 video game

- Developer: Artech Digital Entertainment
- Publisher: Vivendi Games (Note: Released under the Sierra Online brand name)
- Platforms: Xbox 360, Windows
- Release: NA: June 4, 2008
- Genre: Rail shooter
- Modes: Single-player, multiplayer

Aces of the Galaxy is a 2008 rail shooter video game developed by Artech Digital Entertainment and published by Sierra Online. It was released for the Xbox 360 and Microsoft Windows. The player controls a pilot who steals an alien spacecraft, and engages in space battles. Each level follows a predetermined path, and the player can use a chain gun, cluster missiles, and torpedoes to attack enemies. In order to complete the game, the player must complete nine consecutive levels, and if they die at any point, they must restart from the first level.

== Gameplay ==
Gameplay screenshot

Aces of the Galaxy is a rail shooter game played from a third-person perspective. The player controls a pilot who steals a spacecraft from an alien race called the Skurgians, and is subsequently chased. In each level the player flies along a predetermined path and engages in space battles. The player can attack with three types of weapons: a chain gun, which will fire shots in rapid succession; cluster missiles, which will lock onto several enemies at once; and torpedoes, which are effective against larger enemy spacecraft. Each weapon can be upgraded with power-ups found in each level. The player can also use a scanner to reveal hidden enemies, as well as perform barrel rolls and slow down time to dodge enemy attacks.

Each level includes a hidden power-up that if found allows the player to choose one of three different paths, each with their own set of levels. Each path has a different environment and enemy layout. The player must complete nine of the twenty-five available levels consecutively to complete the game. There are no checkpoints or save opportunities in Aces of the Galaxy, which means if the player dies, they must restart from the first level. Each enemy the player kills increases their score, and an online leaderboard tracks player scores from each playthrough.

== Release and reception ==
Reception

Aggregate score
Aggregator	Score
Metacritic	71/100

Review scores
Publication	Score
Eurogamer	6/10
GamePro	4.5/5
GameSpot	8/10
IGN	7.5/10
Official Xbox Magazine (US)	8/10
TeamXbox	8/10

Aces of the Galaxy was released on June 4, 2008, for the Xbox 360 service Xbox Live Arcade and Microsoft Windows. It was the most purchased Xbox Live Arcade game within its first week of release.

IGN awarded Aces an 7.5 of 10, stating, "Aces of the Galaxy is a solid, well-balanced space shooter." Official Xbox Magazine said the game was "So mindlessly enjoyable that you'll soar right past [its] flaws."
