= Gary Papa =

American journalist (1954–2009)

- Born: September 2, 1954; Buffalo, New York, U.S.
- Died: June 19, 2009 (aged 54); Philadelphia, Pennsylvania, U.S.
- Education: University at Buffalo Law School; Cornell University
- Occupation: Sportscaster
- Years active: 1976–2009

Gary Papa (September 2, 1954 – June 19, 2009) was a sportscaster with WPVI-TV in Philadelphia from April 1981 to June 2009 and was the 5:30 p.m., 6 p.m., and 11:00 p.m. sportcaster. He joined the station as a weekend sportscaster in 1981 and was promoted to the 6:00 p.m. and 11:00 p.m. newscasts in 1991, and was named sports director one year prior. In 1999, he added the 5:30 p.m. newscast to his duties on an interim basis due to sports anchor Scott Palmer anchoring regular news on weekend mornings joined by health reporter Anita Brikman.

== Biography ==
Prior to working at WPVI, Papa worked at WGR-TV (1978-1981) in his hometown of Buffalo, New York and WSTV-TV in Steubenville, Ohio (1976-1978). Papa's brother, Greg, was the longtime radio voice of the Oakland Raiders (now the radio voice of the San Francisco 49ers).

Papa co-hosted the Saturday evening public affairs show Primetime Weekend with Cecily Tynan. He had hosted the program since December 3, 1983, when he took over after the death of Jim O'Brien.

On April 20, 2004, he revealed to viewers that he had been receiving treatment for prostate cancer and lost his hair as a result. He continued to work while receiving chemotherapy. Three years later in July 2007, during the 6:00 p.m. Action News broadcast, Papa along with Jim Gardner announced that he once again was going through chemotherapy.

== Death ==
Papa died on June 19, 2009, at 2:57 p.m. at the Hospital of the University of Pennsylvania, at the age of 54; his final sportscast on WPVI had been a month earlier, on May 13. He was survived by his father, insurance adjuster Frank Papa (1926–2019); his wife, Kathleen; and his two sons, Nathaniel and Tucker, along with his brother Greg.

== Legacy ==
Papa was inducted into the Broadcast Pioneers of Philadelphia Hall of Fame on November 14, 2007.
