= Kelli Johnson =

American basketball player and journalist

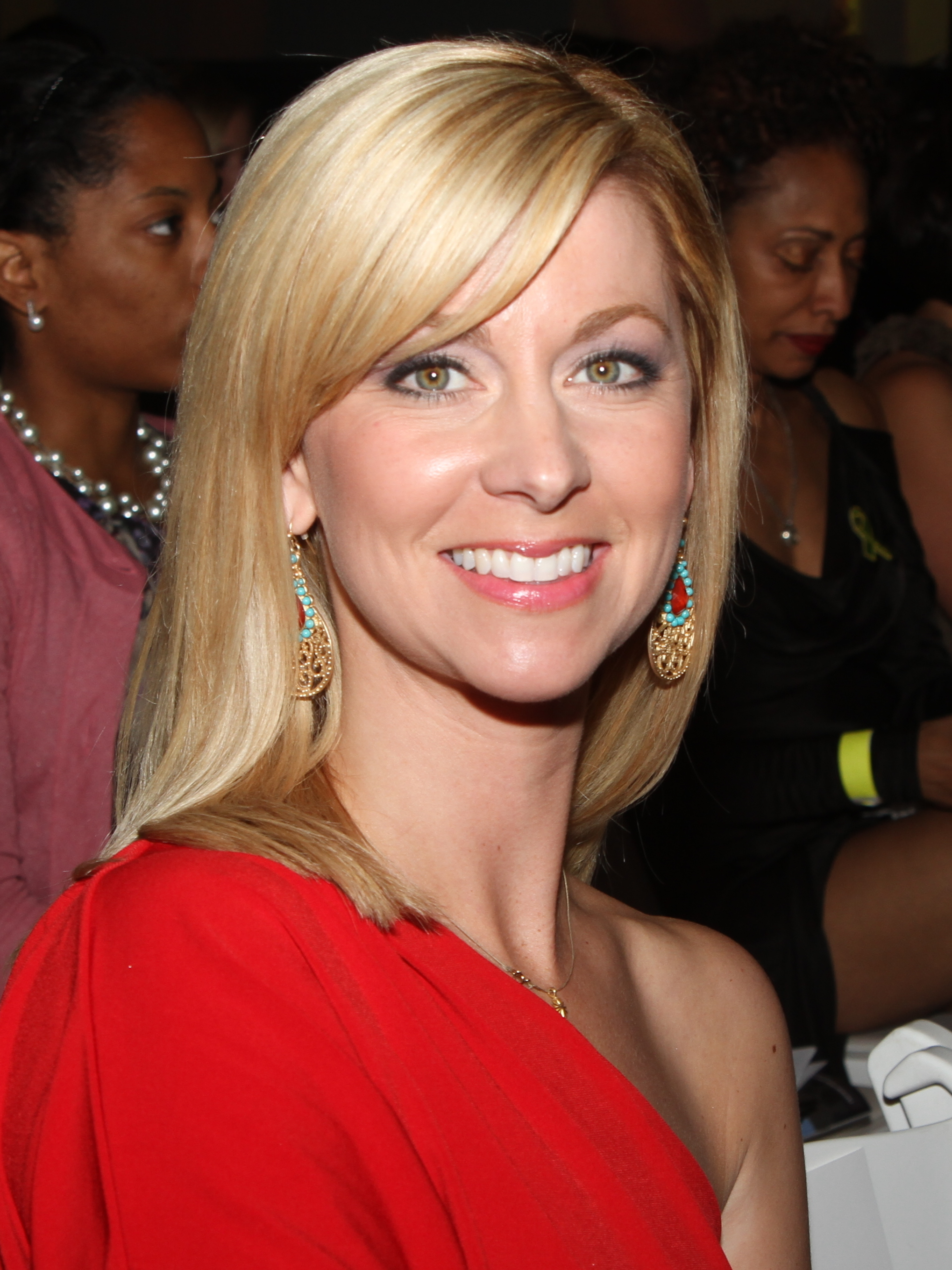
- Johnson in 2011
- Born: 1975 or 1976 (age 49–50)
- Education: University of Idaho
- Occupation: Sports anchor

Kelli Johnson is an American journalist and former sports anchor on NBC Sports Bay Area in San Francisco, California. She provided coverage on the Golden State Warriors and San Francisco Giants as well as other teams. She co-hosted the shows SportsNet Central and The Happy Hour. Growing up in Moscow, Idaho, she played basketball for University of Idaho and went into sports broadcasting with various places such as Medford, Oregon; Austin, Texas; and St. Louis, Missouri. With Comcast, she worked with Comcast SportsNet Mid-Atlantic in the Washington D.C. region, Comcast SportsNet Houston, and eventually NBC Sports Bay Area.

== Background ==
Johnson is a native of Moscow, Idaho. Both of her parents were coaches (baseball and gymnastics) and physical education teachers.

Kelli played point guard for the Moscow High School girls' basketball team. During that time, the team had a three-year winning streak, where they won three consecutive state titles. The Moscow-Pullman Daily News named her State A-2 Most Valuable Player for her senior year.

In 1994, she continued her basketball career immediately, as a freshman in her home town, at the University of Idaho as a shooting guard for the Idaho Vandals women's basketball team. She started all 110 games of her career, which were the third most in school history. As a junior, she set the record for the most three-point field goals in a game (seven) against the University of North Texas. That season, she also broke the career 3-point school record. By the end of her college career, Kelli had made 207 3-pointers – 81 more than the nearest contender. These records stood for 19 and 17 years, respectively. Johnson graduated in 1998 from Idaho with a degree in Broadcast Journalism. She joined her father in the Idaho Vandals Hall of Fame in 2016.

== Sports reporting career ==
Johnson's first job was as a sports reporter for KTVL in Medford, Oregon in 1999. After ten months at the station, she moved to Time Warner Cable in Austin, Texas, still doing sports reporting. Eighteen months later, she had her first position with an NBC affiliate in St. Louis, KSDK.

Then, in 2003, she joined Comcast SportsNet Mid-Atlantic, covering the Baltimore Orioles and, then, the Washington Redskins and Washington Nationals. In 2012, she joined Comcast SportsNet Houston as a sports anchor for SportsNet Central. In 2014, after a layoff from a rebranding of the Houston office, Johnson joined Comcast SportsNet Bay Area in San Francisco where she began covering the San Francisco Giants and the Golden State Warriors. In 2017, Johnson began hosting The Happy Hour, a conversational discussion sports program with media personalities Greg Papa and Ray Ratto; The Happy Hour was canceled at the end of 2018 with the airing of its final episode on December 21. In 2019, she hosted the pre-game and post-game programs for the San Francisco Giants. On August 4, 2020, NBC Sports Bay Area announced that they would not be renewing Johnson's contract.

== Other ventures ==
In addition to freelance reporting, Johnson announced in 2021 that she is involved as a real estate agent.
