= Q*bert (1999 video game) =

- North American cover art
- Developers: Artech Studios; Pipe Dream Interactive (Dreamcast, GBC)
- Publishers: Hasbro Interactive; MacSoft (Mac OS)
- Programmer: Antonio Santamaria
- Composer: Jake Kaufman (GBC)
- Series: Q*bert
- Platforms: Windows, PlayStation, Game Boy Color, Dreamcast, Mac OS
- Release: Windows, PlayStation: NA: November 19, 1999 (PC); NA: November 30, 1999 (PS); EU: 1999; Game Boy Color: NA: September 25, 2000; Dreamcast: NA: December 5, 2000; Mac OS; October 2001
- Genre: Action
- Modes: Single-player, multiplayer

Q*bert is a remake of the 1982 arcade game of the same name with 3D graphics. It was developed by Artech Studios and released by Hasbro Interactive (under the Atari brand name) on the PlayStation and Microsoft Windows in 1999, on the Dreamcast and Game Boy Color in 2000, and on Mac OS in 2001.

== Gameplay ==
Q*bert has three modes of play. Classic is like the original Q*bert, and the graphics can be changed from Retro to Modern. The Adventure mode takes Q*bert to 3D dimensions, and contains power ups and all new characters set in four worlds, with Q*bert aiming to rescue his friends from Coily. Head to Head is a multiplayer mode.

== Reception ==
Reception

Aggregate scores
Aggregator	Score			
Aggregator	Dreamcast	GBC	PC	PS
GameRankings	63%	N/A	67%	54%
Metacritic	58/100	N/A	N/A	N/A

Review scores
Publication	Score			
Publication	Dreamcast	GBC	PC	PS
AllGame	3/5	4.5/5	4.5/5	4.5/5
CNET Gamecenter	N/A	N/A	N/A	5/10
Computer Games Strategy Plus	N/A	N/A	4/5	N/A
Electronic Gaming Monthly	6.5/10	N/A	N/A	8.5/10
EP Daily	N/A	N/A	6/10	4/10
Game Informer	N/A	6.5/10	N/A	N/A
GameFan	N/A	N/A	N/A	91% (Note: In GameFan's viewpoint of the PlayStation version, three critics gave it each a score of 90, 91, and 92.) (T.R.) 78%
GameRevolution	C	N/A	N/A	N/A
GameSpot	3.7/10	N/A	N/A	3.6/10
GameZone	8/10	9/10	N/A	N/A
IGN	7/10	8/10	6.8/10	6.9/10
Next Generation	2/5	N/A	N/A	N/A
Official U.S. PlayStation Magazine	N/A	N/A	N/A	2.5/5
PC Zone	N/A	N/A	65%	N/A

The Dreamcast version received "mixed" reviews according to the review aggregation website Metacritic. AllGame's Brett Alan Weiss praised all aspects of the PlayStation version, while 1Up.com's Jeremy Parish called it a poor adaptation. Kevin Rice of NextGen praised the Dreamcast version's graphics, but criticized the new level designs and also said that adventure mode was not enjoyable. The PlayStation version was the winner of Electronic Gaming Monthly's "Puzzle Game of the Year" award.
