= The UnderGarden =

2010 video game

- The Undergarden icon from PlayStation Store
- Developer: Artech Studios
- Publisher: Atari
- Platforms: Microsoft Windows, PlayStation 3, Xbox 360
- Release: 10 November 2010; PS3: 1 February 2011
- Genre: Puzzle

The UnderGarden is a casual puzzle game released for Microsoft Windows, PlayStation 3 and Xbox 360. It uses a 2D platforming game style with puzzle elements including physics puzzles, and a floating player character. Two player cooperative play was also included. The game was marketed as a 'casual Zen game'.

Tommo purchased the rights to this game and digitally publishes it through its Retroism brand in 2015.

== Reception ==
The game received mixed reviews; it received praise for the appearance and musical presentation, as well as the peaceful or relaxing ambience and broad range of appeal, though actual gameplay was considered by some reviewers to be limited, lacking complexity, or dull in the long-term. A negative review by Kirk Hamilton in Joystiq described the game as having a 'me too' feel, comparing it unfavourably to Flower and Limbo. msxbox-world.com described it as "[feeling] like an artsy game made by a bunch of businessmen, rather than an artist".

Mouse control was considered not as good as control with a gamepad.
