= Eradicator (video game) =

1996 video game

- Developer: Accolade
- Publisher: Accolade
- Platform: MS-DOS
- Release: October 28, 1996
- Genres: First-person shooter, third-person shooter
- Mode: Single-player

Eradicator is a 1996 science fiction-themed video game developed by Accolade for MS-DOS compatible operating systems. The game was re-released on Steam in 2014 and on GOG.com in 2016 with support for Microsoft Windows, macOS, and Linux.

== Gameplay ==
Players choose to play as one of three characters: Kamchak the alien Treydan warrior, human mine engineer Dan Blaze, and mercenary Eleena Brynstaarl. Players then have to complete a series of unique objectives and puzzles within each level. Perspective can be set between first and third-person, as well as additional options such as picture-in-picture. The game allows for the use of twenty different weapons through twenty five levels set within a mysteriously reactivated alien fortress on the planet Ioxia, source of the valuable mineral element Mazrium.

Eradicator also features the ability to remotely control various apparatus and projectiles, among other unique power ups. Areas are themed as defense and miscellaneous bases, factories and refineries, and biological research laboratories. Enemies are ground- and air-based cybernetic mechanisms and alien creatures. Visually and mechanically, the game is sector-based 3D, comparable to Doom and the contemporary Duke Nukem 3D. Multiplayer gameplay over modem and LAN is supported; the game includes several deathmatch levels.

== Release ==
Tommo purchased the rights to this game and digitally publishes it through its Retroism brand in 2015. On February 26, 2016 it was released onto DRM-free retailer GOG.com with support for Microsoft Windows, OS X and Linux through DOSBox. Despite its limited uptake, the game received positive reviews from GameSpot and GameRevolution, as well as Coming Soon Magazine, The Computer Show and VrEOnline.

== Development ==
The game was originally conceived by Joe Ybarra's Creative Insights as "Marble Madness with a 3rd-person view" with the player character being a frog, but this was scrapped in favour of the final darker design upon the project's purchase by Accolade. This brought about the game's conversion to first-person primacy, although the original wholly third-person design lived on in the game's emphasis on platforming. Some developers from the game went on to create Slave Zero, a similar third/first person hybrid. Voice actors were brought in from the game Deadlock: Planetary Conquest.
