= Friends: The One with All the Trivia =

2005 video game

- PlayStation 2 cover art
- Developer: Artech Studios
- Publisher: Warner Bros. Interactive Entertainment
- Platforms: PlayStation 2, Windows
- Release: November 21, 2005
- Genre: Trivia
- Modes: Single-player, multiplayer

Friends: The One with All the Trivia is a 2005 video game developed by Artech Studios and published by Warner Bros. Interactive Entertainment for the PlayStation 2 and Windows.

== Gameplay ==
The game is hosted by Maggie Wheeler (Janice), James Michael Tyler (Gunther), Elliott Gould (Jack Geller) and Christina Pickles (Judy Geller), and features more than 3,000 questions about the program. The game contains 700 episodic clips, audio soundbites, original music and live audience laughter.

== Production ==
The game was released on November 21, 2005, and was intended to be a companion to a full-series DVD release of the series from Warner Home Video (titled "The One with All Ten Seasons"), which released three weeks prior on October 31.

== Critical reception ==
Cheat CC felt that the game looked cheap. Jogos noted that while it is a budget title, the game quality is still very poor for that type of release. 7Wolf noted the game would be "absolutely useless" to any players who had not watched Friends. Gamezone criticised the game's pixelated graphics and "annoying" question-readers. IGN said the game's front-end graphics look like they were made in Flash. Jeuxvideo felt the questions were either too hard or too easy. 20 Minutes felt the gameplay was very commonplace. Gamekult noted that the game had bad video quality.
