= HardBall 5 =

1995 video game

- Developers: MindSpan; Cygnus Multimedia Productions (Genesis)
- Publishers: Accolade; PlayStation: NA: Accolade; JP: SPS Co., Ltd.
- Producers: Michael Person; Pam Levins
- Programmers: Jeff Sember; Mike Benna
- Artists: Chris Eckardt; Dale Mauk; James Johnson
- Writer: Jim Carr
- Composer: Brian Shaw
- Series: HardBall!
- Platforms: MS-DOS, PlayStation, Genesis
- Release: Genesis: NA: June 1995; MS-DOS: NA: October 9, 1995; PlayStation: NA: 5 September 1996; JP: 13 December 1996
- Genre: Sports
- Modes: Single-player, multiplayer

HardBall 5 is a sports video game developed by American studio MindSpan and published by Sport Accolade for MS-DOS, Genesis, and PlayStation. Al Michaels provides color commentary.

== Gameplay ==
HardBall 5 is a baseball game with completely adjustable statistics. All MLB teams are featured, although the team logos are absent and replaced with fictional ones.

A special league featuring historic teams of the past is also available.

== Reception ==
Reception

Review scores
Publication	Score
AllGame	3/5 (GEN); 3.5/5 (PS1)
Computer Gaming World	3.5/5 (DOS)
Electronic Gaming Monthly	1/5 (PS)
Game Players	66% (PS)
GameFan	76/100 (PS)
GamePro	4.25/5 (GEN); 2.5/5 (PS)
GameSpot	8.4/10 (DOS)
Hyper	91% (PS)
IGN	4/10 (PS)
Next Generation	3/5 (DOS); 2/5 (GEN); 2/5 (PS)
PC Gamer (US)	86/100 (DOS)
PC Zone	71% (DOS)
Flux	D+ (GEN)
PC Entertainment	3.7/5 (DOS)
Ultimate Gamer	8/10 (DOS)
VideoGames	7/10 (GEN); 6/10 (PS)

Next Generation reviewed the Genesis version of the game as HardBall '95, rating it two stars out of five, and stated that "Sim fanatics will love the stats, but the poor gameplay quickly removes any ideas of playing out a whole season."

Next Generation gave the MS-DOS version three stars out of five and stated that "The latest addition to the Hardball series is a good, solid one, but there's still a lot of room for improvement." The magazine gave the PlayStation conversion two stars out of five, and stated that "Hardball 5 is best viewed as a strict statistical simulation. Anyone who's looking for a playable baseball game should look elsewhere."

As of February 1997 the game sold over 250,000 copies.
