= Alien Mind =

1988 action video game

- Box cover art showing a depiction of the Zekford Space Station
- Developers: Rob Karr & Matt Crysdale
- Publishers: PBI Software, Inc
- Platform: Apple IIGS
- Release: 1988
- Genre: Action-adventure

Alien Mind is an action-adventure game for the Apple IIGS, published and released by PBI Software in 1988. It is the final game from PBI, and notable as a GS-only title, in taking advantage of the graphics and sound capabilities of the machine to present an arcade style game.

== Plot ==
Two unhatched alien eggs, discovered in the Herzgod IV solar system, have been brought aboard the newly built five level Zekford Space Station. Timothy Hunter, after receiving a telegram from Aaron Avery–a long-time friend and associate Biologist, boards the Zekford Space Station to join him to study the eggs. The player takes the role of Hunter, who upon arrival, discovers everyone on the station has been killed. Avery, the only survivor and in hiding, informs him one of the eggs has hatched and released a super-intelligent alien. It has reprogrammed the station's security and maintenance robots to kill all humans, and is mind controlling lesser alien animal lifeforms (freed from the on-board research labs) to do the same. The alien itself has gone off into hiding and tapped into the station's central computer system, which is linked to everything. The alien closely monitors the computer terminals, the only means of communication between Hunter and Avery.

Hunter traverses the station, descending level by level, while fighting off killer robots, alien monsters and avoiding automated station defenses. At various points Avery is able to leave password-protected messages for Hunter by hacking into the station's various public service systems. Avery formulates a plan to defeat the alien while using cryptic clues and puzzles as passwords, hoping to throw it off and buy time in the process. It is decided the alien must be destroyed and the second egg stopped from hatching, or all of humanity is doomed. Towards the end of the game, pieces of a gun weapon are collected and assembled to use in a final confrontation with the alien.

== Gameplay ==
As an overhead 2D multi-directional scroller, the player navigates large rooms, corridors and maze-like passage ways aboard the Zekford Space Station. The player starts off with a needle-gun to defend himself against enemies that continually re-spawn. More powerful guns can be found and collected as the game progresses. Other collectable items include: ammo, health packs, energy conductors (slows enemies), energy shields (temporary invincibility) and key cards. Some special items found are necessary for completing a level (e.g. repair tool kit, elevator passes, printed schematics, chemicals, weapon parts).

The player can jump, shoot, access computer terminals and sit in chairs (necessary, as some terminals are seated). There are dozens of installed terminals, but only the correct one can access Avery's messages and must be located by the player. Corpses littering the floor may impede progress, however jumping or boarding a hovercraft prevents that. Locked doors can only be opened using key cards collected.

When logged into a terminal Avery has previously hacked, a correct password must be typed, provided through clues and puzzles. New messages reveal where the next terminal can be found, instructions for the next task or where special items can be located. All pieces of the super gun weapon must be collected before confronting the alien. The story unfolds and revealed in greater details through messages read on the terminal screens.

== Reception ==
Alien Mind received generally positive reception. John Munn reviewed the game for Computer Gaming World, and stated that "Alien Mind is an easily embraceable game designed with a relatively simple blending of strategic role-playing with the finger-itching excitement of an arcade game." Computist writer Philip G. Romine praised the game, feeling that it reflected well on the developer's work ethic and the capabilities of the platform due to the quality of sound, animation, and display. Guida Videogiochi staff felt similarly about the graphics and sound as well as the challenge of the game. They considered it one of the best games on the platform.
