= SportsTalk Live (NBC Sports Bay Area) =

SportsTalk Live is a television sports discussion series that airs on NBC Sports Bay Area in the United States.

The TV show began in 2009. It was originally titled Chronicle Live (2009–13), and then Yahoo! SportsTalk Live (in 2013), broadcasting on the station formerly known as Comcast Sportsnet Bay Area on Comcast Sportsnet California.

At its inception, it was hosted by veteran Bay Area sportscaster Greg Papa, well known as being the radio voice of the Oakland Raiders. Since 2019, it was hosted by Jim Kozimor.

== History ==
The show was announced in February 2009, as part of a revamping of the CSN Bay Area lineup. Previously, the channel (then Fox Sports Net Bay Area) was mainly just for airing local sports telecasts and FSN original programming. When the channel was re-launched in April 2008 as CSN Bay Area, plans were announced to have a news show for all Bay Area sports. It was then announced that sports talk show would premiere as well, and would be hosted by Greg Papa. The show is named for the San Francisco Chronicle newspaper, as the show's panel is composed primarily of columnists from the Chronicle. However, writers from the MediaNews Group (mainly the San Jose Mercury News, Oakland Tribune and Contra Costa Times) and the Sacramento Bee also frequent the show.

The show premiered on April 6, 2009 along with the news show (Sportsnet Central). Like the launch of CSN Bay Area itself a year earlier, this was intentionally set at the same time as the start of the baseball season. The show is thought to be the first of its kind in the Bay Area.

== Subjects ==
Half of the show's purpose is to discuss Bay Area news and results of the main pro and college teams. For example, in the first month, topics such as the start of the season for the San Francisco Giants and Oakland Athletics baseball teams, the playoff run for the San Jose Sharks and the conclusion of the season for the Golden State Warriors were discussed. The later half of 2009 was mostly dominated by the San Francisco 49ers and Oakland Raiders. The other half of the show's purpose is to interview a large variety of Bay Area sports personalities. Often this will be coaches and players of teams currently playing. All of the main pro teams (The Giants, A's, Sharks, Warriors, Raiders and 49ers) have been represented, as well as UC Berkeley, Stanford, San Jose State and other local college teams for various sports.

== Regular guests ==
- Cam Inman - Contra Costa Times columnist
- Tim Kawakami - San Jose Mercury News columnist
- Ann Killion - csnbayarea.com columnist
- Monte Poole - Oakland Tribune columnist
- Mark Purdy - San Jose Mercury News columnist
- Ray Ratto - CSN Bay Area Senior Insider
- Scott Ostler - San Francisco Chronicle columnist
- Damon Bruce - KNBR 1050 radio host
- Roxy Bernstein - Sports Byline USA radio host
- Al Saracevic - San Francisco Chronicle columnist and editor

== Other ==
=== Substitute hosts ===
When Greg Papa had a scheduling conflict (such as a Raiders game) or was on vacation, notable fill-in hosts included:

- Dave Benz - Sportsnet Central co-host
- Jim Kozimor - Comcast Sportsnet contributor
- Gary Radnich - Bay Area sports radio host
- Barry Tompkins - Pac-10 play-by-play caller for Fox Sports Net

Kozimor eventually became the show's full-time host in 2019.

=== On the road ===
Chronicle Live was typically filmed in the CSN Bay Area's studios in San Francisco, but the show has moved to other sites for special events. These have included:

- AT&T Park - During the Bay Bridge Series in San Francisco.
- Oakland Coliseum - During the Bay Bridge Series in Oakland.
- HP Pavilion - For the San Jose Sharks' home opener for the 2009-2010 season.
- Stanford Stadium - Filmed the day before the 2009 Big Game between Stanford and Cal.
- Haas Pavilion (UC Berkeley) - Filmed prior to the men's basketball game between Cal and Oregon, the television play-by-play being handled by Greg Papa.

During these specials, the guests would almost exclusively be related to the team hosting the event, or related to the event itself.

== See also ==
- CSN Bay Area
