= Unnecessary Roughness '95 =

1994 video game

- Genesis cover art
- Developer: Accolade
- Publisher: Accolade
- Platforms: Genesis, MS-DOS
- Release: Genesis: NA: November 1994
- Genre: Sports
- Modes: Single-player, multiplayer

Unnecessary Roughness '95 is an American football sports video game released for the Genesis and MS-DOS in 1994. Other entries in the series are Unnecessary Roughness (1993) and Unnecessary Roughness '96 (1996).

== Gameplay ==
First-quarter kickoff

Players can compete in exhibition games either against the AI-controlled opponent or against another human player.

Regular seasons, playoffs, and Super Bowls can be played as well. One of the primary features in the game is the Construction Set; where entire teams, stadiums, and tournaments can be made from scratch. They can be traded with friends through the use of floppy disks (as in the case with the DOS version). Players from the 1993 NFL season are used. These athletes have individual ratings in offense, defense, and athletic ability. A "Two Minute" drill forces a scenario where the player has to beat the computer with only two minutes left in the fourth quarter.

Announcer Al Michaels calls the plays on the DOS version. A battery save function allows the saving of seasons and statistics for the Genesis version.

== Reception ==
In 1994, PC Gamer UK named Unnecessary Roughness the 50th best computer game of all time. The editors wrote, "For fans and non-fans alike, there's no better American Football game on the PC."

In 1996, Computer Gaming World declared Unnecessary Roughness the 33rd-worst computer game ever released.
