= Deadlock II: Shrine Wars =

1998 video game

- Developer: Cyberlore Studios
- Publisher: Accolade
- Platform: Microsoft Windows
- Release: NA: February 23, 1998
- Genre: Turn-based strategy
- Modes: Single-player, multiplayer

Deadlock II: Shrine Wars is a science fiction turn-based strategy video game developed by Cyberlore Studios and published by Accolade, released on February 23, 1998 as a sequel to Deadlock: Planetary Conquest. The game allows the player to play as the leader of an alien species who controls colonies on a planet's surface.

Tommo purchased the rights to this game and digitally publishes it through its Retroism brand in 2015.

== Overview ==
Deadlock II: Shrine Wars features turn-based gameplay that takes place on a planet map that ranges from around 1 to 9000 tiles, each presenting a region, or area of building. Players take control of each territory by colonizing it with a "Colonizer" vehicle or taking it from another player through military conquest. Each territory consists of a six-by-six grid in which buildings can be placed. Like most strategy games, Deadlock II: Shrine Wars uses natural resources and credits to pay for new units and buildings. Colonists are assigned to buildings to generate resources and research. These new units and buildings are able to be created after their prerequisite technologies are researched.

== Reception ==
Reception

Aggregate score
| Aggregator | Score |
|---|---|
| GameRankings | 66% |

Review scores
| Publication | Score |
|---|---|
| CNET Gamecenter | 8/10 |
| Computer Games Strategy Plus | 2/5 |
| Computer Gaming World | 2/5 |
| Game Informer | 6/10 |
| GameRevolution | C− |
| GameSpot | 7.2/10 |
| Next Generation | 3/5 |
| PC Gamer (US) | 77% |

The game received average reviews according to the review aggregation website GameRankings. Next Generation called it "a decent game, but unfortunately the addition of Net play and a new interface hardly seem to justify the release of a new product, or its purchase."
