= Revolution '76 =

1989 video game

- Developer: Britannica Software
- Programmer: Ed Bever
- Platforms: Apple IIGS, MS-DOS
- Release: 1989
- Genres: Simulation, strategy
- Mode: Single-player

Revolution '76 is a 1989 simulation/strategy video game by Britannica Software designed for Apple IIGS and MS-DOS. It was written by former Sid Meier colleague, Ed Bever. The game is a simulation of the economic, social and political conditions at the commencement of the American Revolutionary War.

== Reception ==
Ace magazine felt the game was both complex and manageable. Compute magazine thought the title was a recreation of the war couched inside a video game. Computer Gaming World decided that the game offered depth, challenge, and replay value.
