= HardBall! =

1985 video game

- Developer: Accolade
- Publisher: Accolade
- Designer: Bob Whitehead
- Artist: Mimi Doggett
- Composer: Ed Bogas
- Platforms: Commodore 64, Apple II, Atari 8-bit, Amstrad CPC, ZX Spectrum, Mac, Atari ST, Amiga, Apple IIGS, MSX2, MS-DOS, Genesis
- Release: 1985: C64; 1987: Atari 8-bit June 1991: Genesis
- Genre: Sports
- Modes: Single-player, multiplayer

HardBall! is a baseball video game published by Accolade. Initially released for the Commodore 64 in 1985, it was ported to other computers over the next several years. A Sega Genesis cartridge was published in 1991. HardBall! was followed by HardBall II, HardBall III, HardBall IV, HardBall 5, and HardBall 6.

== Gameplay ==
Throwing a pitch on the Commodore 64 version, with options for the pitcher and batter

Play is controlled with a joystick or arrow keys and an action button. One of the four cardinal directions is used to choose the pitch, and again to aim it towards low, high, inside (towards batter), or outside (away from batter). The same directions are used to aim the swing when batting. When fielding after a hit, the defensive player closest to the ball will flash to show it is the one currently under control. The four directions are then used to throw to one of the four bases.

HardBall! was one of the first baseball video games to incorporate the perspective from the pitcher's mound, similar to MLB broadcasts. There are also managerial options available. The player has a selection of pitchers to choose from. Each team member has his own statistics that affect his performance, and can be rearranged as desired. Prior to HardBall!'s release, there were managerial baseball games available, such as MicroLeague Baseball but HardBall! was the first to integrate that aspect with the arcade control of the game action itself.

== Reception ==
Reception

Review scores
Publication	Score
AllGame	3/5 (C64/128)
MegaTech	75% (GEN)

HardBall! was a commercial blockbuster. The Commodore 64 version topped the UK sales chart in early 1986. It went on to become Accolade's best-selling Commodore game as of late 1987; by 1989, this version had surpassed 500,000 units sold.

Info rated HardBall! four-plus stars out of five, stating that it "is easily the best baseball simulation we have seen to date for the 64/128" and praising its graphics. "Graphics is HardBall's strength. Realism isn't", Antic said of the Atari 8-bit version. Citing unrealistic computer play, and a bug allowing for more than three outs, as examples of "questionable at best" gameplay, the magazine concluded "HardBall comes across as more like an ambitious arcade game than a full-fledged computer simulation". ANALOG Computing praised the Atari 8-bit version's gameplay, graphic, and animation, only criticizing the computer opponent's low difficulty level. The magazine concluded that the game "is in a league of its own, above all other Atari sports games—simulations included".

In an overview of statistics-oriented baseball games, Computer Gaming World stated that HardBall! "would probably be disappointing to anyone other than an avid arcade fan". Compute!'s Apple Applications stated that the Apple II and Macintosh versions had "almost everything you could want from a baseball simulation", with good support for playing as manager, player, or statistician and "exceptionally clear and precise graphics". The magazine concluded that "HardBall!'s realism is outstanding—at a level unmatched by other baseball software to date". The game was reviewed in 1988 in Dragon #132 by Hartley, Patricia, and Kirk Lesser in "The Role of Computers" column. The reviewers gave the game 5 out of 5 stars. MegaTech gave the Genesis version a score of 75%, writing: "A decent baseball game which doesn't have enough novel or interesting features to make it appeal to anyone other than real fans of the sport."

Entertainment Weekly picked the game as the #11 greatest game available in 1991, saying: "With its oversaturated colors, ultrarealistic sound effects (when the umpire shouts 'Play ball!' it sounds as if he's in the room), and detailed managerial options, HardBall! is the closest you may ever get to playing in a real major-league ballpark."
