= Wheel of Fortune video games =

Wheel of Fortune
- Genre: Game show
- Publishers: GameTek; Sony Imagesoft; Take-Two Interactive; Hasbro Interactive/Atari Interactive; Sony Online Entertainment; THQ; Ubisoft
- Creator: Merv Griffin (original game show)
- Latest release: Wheel of Fortune (Nintendo Switch); October 30, 2018

Wheel of Fortune is an American television game show created by Merv Griffin, premiering in 1975 with a syndicated version airing in 1983. Since 1986, the syndicated version has been adapted into various video games spanning numerous hardware generations. Most versions released in the 20th century were published by GameTek, which filed for Chapter 11 bankruptcy protection in 1998.

== Console games ==
An Atari 2600 adaptation of Wheel of Fortune was planned by The Great Game Co. in 1983, but ended up being cancelled during development. In 1987 the first of GameTek's many Wheel games was published, with Sharedata as its developer; this version was released simultaneously on the Commodore 64 and the Nintendo Entertainment System, and subsequently spawned a second Commodore 64 version of Wheel from Sharedata, as well as a "Family Edition" and a "Junior Edition", both of which were exclusive to the NES and were developed by Rare Neither host Pat Sajak nor hostess Vanna White is featured in any of these games. However, White is featured in a later NES game from GameTek and IJE Inc., which was released in 1992; she also appeared on the Sega Genesis, Super NES, and the Game Gearversions. The magazine Mega gave the Super NES and Genesis versions a score of 22%, saying that there was "no challenge". A "Deluxe Edition" was also released for the Super NES in 1994. A sequel, Wheel of Fortune 2, was planned for Genesis but never released.

In 1994, Sony Imagesoft released a game based on Wheel for the Sega CD. Next Generation rated it two stars out of five, and stated that "Even as a party game, Wheel of Fortune doesn't cut it." Two years later, GameTek made plans to create adaptations for the Sega Saturn and the 3DO, but both were canceled during development.

In mid-1997, Take-Two Interactive acquired GameTek's assets, including the rights to develop Wheel of Fortune games for the Nintendo 64. On December 2, 1997, Take-Two Interactive released its first Wheel game for the Nintendo 64; this was Take-Two's last collaboration with GameTek. The Sega CD and N64 versions of Wheel both feature full-motion video footage of White as host. Reviews generally stated that the N64 version did not hold up well to other N64 games but did a decent job of recreating the show, particularly the camera movements and the 3D studio. However, they derided the unnatural-sounding voices of the contestants and the animations of Vanna White walking in front of the puzzles (without touching the panels when they light up). The game received a score of 6.4 out of 10 from IGN and 5.125 out of 10 from Electronic Gaming Monthly.

Artech Studios and Hasbro Interactive produced a video game adaptation of Wheel for Sony Computer Entertainment's PlayStation console on December 15, 1998; this version again features White appearing as host via FMV sequences, Charlie O'Donnell as the announcer, and a 3-D engine that allows it to have a presentation similar to that of the actual show. This particular version is compatible with a memory card which allows it to avoid previously played puzzles until the entire library has been played through. On September 12, 2000, Hasbro released a second PlayStation version of Wheel, which features a behind-the-scenes interview with White and a qualifying exam for contestant hopefuls. Following the purchase and rebranding of Hasbro Interactive as Atari Interactive, the company released a PlayStation 2 edition in November 2003. On March 19, 2009, Sony Online Entertainment released a version of the show for the PlayStation 3 through the PlayStation Network, using the Gamebryo engine; Chris Roper of IGN gave that version a 5.8 out of 10, saying that it felt "empty and lifeless" for not featuring any host or hostess or any voice work whatsoever, and also criticized the graphic quality, saying that the game was "not fully polished".

On November 2, 2010, THQ released video games based on Wheel of Fortune for Nintendo's Wii and Nintendo DS console. This set of games is the first to feature Sajak as well as White as well as the last to feature announcer Charlie O'Donnell, which was released a day after his death. In 2012, THQ published reworked versions of the Wii version developed by Pipeworks Software appeared for the PlayStation 3, the Wii U, and Microsoft's Xbox 360, with Jim Thornton as the announcer.

On November 7, 2017, Ubisoft released versions based on Wheel of Fortune for PlayStation 4 and Xbox One, using the Unity engine. The game comes in digital download as well as a bundle retail version with Jeopardy!. This version of Wheel of Fortune features Classic and Quick modes, as well as online multiplayer options like leaderboards and voice chat. It includes over 4,000 puzzles and a leveling system that enables players to unlock 250 new customization items that can be used on contestants or the studio set. This version was later released for Nintendo Switch a year later. However, all 3 console versions didn't feature Pat Sajak and Vanna White, and instead were replaced by a generic host and hostess. Jim Thornton still appears as the announcer during the show's opening titles.

== Handheld games ==
In 1988, Mattel created a Wheel of Fortune game that allowed playing along with the TV show. At that time, the show would include encoded data at the beginning of each round, seen as flickering in the TV picture, that the Mattel machine could "download" to receive the puzzle and timing information for when letters were revealed in the puzzle. The game allowed players to spin and guess letters in the puzzle, buy vowels, and solve the puzzle. If a contestant on the TV show solved the puzzle before a person playing the Mattel machine solved it, the machine would reveal the puzzle and terminate the round.

In 1990, GameTek created a Wheel of Fortune game for the Game Boy. Then in 1997, Tiger Electronics released two adaptations of the show for its Game.com system, which allows players to use the console's touchscreen to select letters. Additionally, Majesco once planned a Wheel adaptation of its own for the Game Boy Color but that was cancelled. On November 2, 2010, THQ published a Nintendo DS Wheel of Fortune video game developed by Griptonite Games, which allows players to customize and name their player character.

Additionally, a number of Wheel games have been released for mobile telephones. On May 2, 2005, InfoSpace's Atlas Mobile studio created a tournament-style game based on the show as part of its "For Prizes" lineup of games allowing players to win free gift certificates; this game is set to a time limit of five minutes and requires players to complete the regular rounds in five turns or less apiece. Subsequent mobile phone incarnations of the show were released by Sony Pictures Mobile in 2006, 2008, 2010, and 2012.

== PC games ==
Wheel of Fortune has also been adapted for personal computers. From 1987 through 1990, GameTek created five Wheel of Fortune computer games for the Apple II, Commodore 64, and MS-DOS. On November 15, 1998, Hasbro Interactive released a PC version of its own, where Vanna White is joined by the then-current Wheel announcer, Charlie O'Donnell (but not Pat Sajak). In 2000, a Mac port was released by MacSoft That same year, Hasbro released a second PC version of Wheel, which like the aforementioned PlayStation equivalent features a behind-the-scenes interview and a qualifying exam. Atari's 2003 follow-up also saw a Windows version of its own which was published by infogrames.

In 2007, Sony Online Entertainment produced a Windows version of the show titled Wheel of Fortune Deluxe, sharing publishing duties with Encore, Inc. Encore followed that up with a "Super Deluxe" version of the game in 2008.

== Internet ==
Sony Pictures Digital and Game Show Network's interactive division released a free Wheel of Fortune game on Facebook. It combined most aspects of the TV game show and allowed players to become contestants competing for virtual currency, called "Wheel Bucks," by playing a "Main Round" puzzle on their own and a "Bonus Round" puzzle allowing them to collaborate with their Facebook friends to increase their winnings. The game was later moved to GSN's "Games by GSN Casino" with better graphics, faster load times, the ability to amass collections and win trophies, and a full-screen mode, but eventually the game was taken down. The "Games by GSN Casino" has also featured a "Wheel of Fortune Slots" game that abides by the basic rules of slots games but incorporates aspects of the actual show in various ways, such as featuring a bonus game where players can spin the Wheel to increase their earnings. Neither game features Sajak nor White, and both games support only one player.

Since 1996, International Game Technology has consistently released a number of Wheel of Fortune branded online slot games alongside their range of physical games that can be found in land-based casinos. These online slots include Wheel of Fortune, Wheel of Fortune Triple Spin Extreme, Wheel of Fortune on Tour, Wheel of Fortune on the Road, Wheel of Fortune On Air, Wheel of Fortune Ruby Riches, Wheel of Fortune Winning Words Game, Wheel of Fortune Hawaiian Getaway and Wheel of Fortune Exotic Far East.

== Sales ==
The Nintendo 64 Wheel of Fortune title shipped 185,000 units.
