= Rack 'Em =

1988 video game

- Developer: Artech
- Publisher: Accolade
- Designers: Paul Butler; Rick Banks
- Artist: Grant Campbell
- Composer: Paul Butler
- Platforms: Commodore 64, MS-DOS
- Release: 1988
- Genre: Sports
- Mode: Single-player

Rack 'Em is a sports video game developed by Artech Digital Entertainment and published by Accolade. Rack 'Em simulates five cue-sports, including pool and snooker. The game was released for both MS-DOS and Commodore 64 in 1988.

== Gameplay ==
Rack 'Em has five different game modes: Snooker, Pool, 8-ball, 9-ball and Bumper Pool. A trick shot mode allows saving shots to disk. The game includes in-game editor for the bumper pool mode.

== Reception ==
The game received a score of 708/1000 from ACE magazine in March 1989, that described the game as having "pretty realistic" game physics. However, the game does not have opponent artificial intelligence to play against, and ACE described this omission as the "sole disappointing aspect of Rack 'Em".
