= Combat Cars =

1994 video game

- European cover art
- Developer: Scangames
- Publisher: Accolade
- Artist: Stefan Holmqvist
- Composer: John Carehag
- Platform: Genesis
- Release: NA: June 1994; EU: July 8, 1994
- Genres: Racing, vehicular combat
- Modes: Single-player, multiplayer

Combat Cars is a racing vehicular combat game developed by Scangames and published by Accolade, and released for the Sega Genesis in 1994.

== Gameplay ==
The player races against other cars and can use various kinds of weapons and gadgets to damage their opponents. The game contains eight playable characters: Jackyl, Sadie Marks, Ray Shades, Mekmac, Metro 1200, Growl, Big Bad Mama and Andrew Alien. Each character has his/her own strengths and weaknesses (speed, car handling, etc.), as well as unique weapons, including a shotgun, glue spots that they can leave to slow other cars, homing missiles, mines, and others. There are 24 different tracks available in the game. The player earns money for winning or placing in races, and this money is used to calculate their score. As the player spends this money on upgrades for their vehicle, their score lowers accordingly.

The player must complete the 24 circuit tracks in multiple laps in linear fashion within a time limit if the player can reach the only checkpoint (which is the start/finish line) in a race to extend the time limit, and should the player run out of time or fail a race, the game is over. The player then must enter their name onto the scoreboard, the background being the type of environment the last race took place. After entering their name, the game resets to the SEGA introduction screen. The game also has a 2-player co-op mode.

== Development ==
Combat Cars was originally developed by Scangames in December 1992 as Fun Car Rally. The game's art was done by Stefan Holmqvist. The music was composed Matt Furniss, drawing inspiration from "Fun, Fun, Fun" by the Beach Boys (for the title screen) and "Get Out of Your Lazy Bed" by Matt Bianco (for the name entry screen). Scangames sold the game to Accolade through MagiCom (later Funcom). However, Accolade wanted the game to have a "cooler" appearance and techno music, so the game was renamed Combat Cars, the eight playable characters were redesigned, and weapons were added. John Carehag composed the soundtrack in Microsoft Works in five to six weeks. It was mostly inspired by 2 Unlimited, of which he had a cassette in his Walkman. The exceptions were the main menu and character select screens, which were inspired by "What Is Love" by Haddaway, and the Beach circuit track, which was based on "Justify My Love" by Madonna. Carehag had about 8 minutes to make the former tracks.

== Reviews ==
Reception

Review scores
Publication	Score
Consoles +	85%
Computer and Video Games	67%
Electronic Gaming Monthly	6.6
Mean Machines Sega	71%

Combat Cars received average reviews upon release. Mean Machines Sega described the game as "unexpectedly addictive" and enjoyable due to its variety of tracks and two-player mode, but found the game's graphics to be "competent but unsurprising", the cars to have "lacklustre special powers", and critiqued the lack of track customisation or editing. Computer & Video Games enjoyed the "pop techno" music but found that the "slidey" control system and "bland" sprites spoiled the game's fun. Electronic Gaming Monthly found the game to be "a blast with two drivers", although noting some of the variety of cars had "unfair advantages" over others.
