= 2088: The Cryllan Mission =

1989 video game

- Cover art by Jose Villegas
- Developer: Victory Software
- Publisher: Victory Software
- Designers: Vinay Pai; Vivek Pai; Vijay Pai
- Platform: Apple IIGS
- Release: 1989; 1990 (The Second Scenario)
- Genre: Role-playing
- Mode: Single-player

2088: The Cryllan Mission is a 1989 role-playing video game developed and published by Victory Software for the Apple IIGS.

== Gameplay ==
2088: The Cryllan Mission is a game in which a new spacecraft crew must find out what happened to the U.S.S. Houston on the planet Crylla.

== Development and release ==
2088: The Cryllan Mission was developed by Victory Software, which was composed of brothers Vinay, Vivek, and Vijay Pai. The family moved from India to Houston in 1978 and purchased an Apple computer in 1981 with a young Vinay quickly learning to code on the machine. The brothers began submitting programs to the Apple II-centric magazine Nibble in 1982. Vinay graduated from Rice University in 1988 with a degree in computer science, first working for IBM before forming Victory with Vivek and Vijay that same year. Their company’s name was taken from the ubiquitous brand in the George Orwell novel Nineteen Eighty-Four.

Vinay led the team on the three titles they produced, writing one third of the code using an Apple IIGS, giving demos, and doing the company's cold calling. He also penned the manual for 2088 and said that they commissioned the cover artwork for $250. The team relied on Apple for marketing, believing the IIGS to show immense promise for the future. Vinay later proclaimed that they were committed to the IIGS in what he posited was a time when many companies were abandoning the platform. "Victory Software, however, has written a true IIGS application and, in the process, created a role-playing game with some unconventional features, such as our conversation", he stated. The game’s design was influenced by the developers' Indian heritage and their interests in popular culture including Star Trek, Apocalypse Now, The Killing Fields, and the Ultima series. The repetitive and verbose speech of its NPCs was intended to pad the game’s length and challenge the player to decipher clues to advance.

2088 was released in 1989. The trio spent tens of thousands of dollars on manufacturing about 5,000 full-color game boxes. They sold the game online, through magazines, and at Babbage’s in Dallas. Most of the revenue from its very steep asking price of $69.95 went back into manufacturing and advertising. When it was commercially unsuccessful, Victory changed some of the graphics and dialogue and re-released it with the subtitle The Second Scenario in 1990, packaged in original 2088 boxes with a gold sticker simply slapped on to liquidate unsold stock. Victory folded shortly thereafter, having been in operation for just two years. Vinay said in 2016 that he considered the experience "a good failure" in which he learned a lot.

== Reception ==
Dennis Owens reviewed the game for Computer Gaming World, and stated that "Overall, 2088: The Cryllan Mission marks a promising entrance into the still underdeveloped market of IIGS-specific software by a new company."
