= Killed Until Dead =

1986 video game

- ZX Spectrum cover art
- Developer: Artech
- Publishers: NA: Accolade; EU: U.S. Gold
- Designers: Michael Bate; Rick Banks
- Programmer: MaryLou O'Rourke
- Artists: Scott Fiander; Grant Campbell
- Composer: Paul Butler
- Platforms: Commodore 64, Apple II, Amstrad CPC, ZX Spectrum
- Release: C64: NA: December 1986; EU: 1987; Apple II: NA: July 1987; CPC, ZX Spectrum: EU: 1987
- Genre: Adventure
- Mode: Single-player

Killed Until Dead is a 1986 adventure game developed by Artech and published by Accolade for the Apple II, Amstrad CPC, Commodore 64, and ZX Spectrum.

== Gameplay ==
The game seems to be inspired by Cluedo, where the player must eliminate clues as they get closer to stopping the crime, the objective being to prevent a murder before it happens. Gameplay mainly revolves around interrogating key suspects and interviewing them about other people, places, and objects. False accusations can result in the player getting killed, lending to the game's humorous ironic sentiments.

== Plot ==
Five mystery writers have gathered at a mansion and one of them plans to murder another. The player takes the role of Hercule Holmes, who must piece together all aspects of the crime in order to solve the case. The player can search suspect's rooms, confront them with evidence, and order cameras to record secret meetings.

== Reception ==
Reception

Review scores
Publication	Score
Crash	93% (Spectrum)
Aktueller Software Markt	9.6/12 (C64)
Happy Computer	76% (C64)
Computer and Video Games	7.6/10 (C64)

Award
Publication	Award
Crash	Smash

The game was well-received, garnering positive to average reviews.

Crash magazine deemed Killed Until Dead both involved and highly entertaining. Aktueller Software Markt gave the game a score of 9.6 out of 12, while Happy Computer offered a rating of 76%.

Computer and Video Games praised the humorous cartoon animations and frequent sound effects. Comparing Killed Until Dead to Clue, Compute!'s Gazette liked the game's user interface, note system, and humor, concluding that it "fits in very well with Accolade's impressive line of 64 software". Roy Wagner reviewed the game for Computer Gaming World, and stated that "The game is great family or group entertainment. The graphics and animation are tremendous; the presentation is very much like a movie; and the humor in the game is outstandingly funny. All puns are very much intended."
