= Mini-Putt (video game) =

1987 video game

- Developers: Artech Digital Entertainment; A-Wave (Famicom)
- Publishers: Accolade; A-Wave (Famicom)
- Platforms: Commodore 64, MS-DOS, Family Computer, ZX Spectrum, Apple IIGS
- Release: 1987

Mini-Putt is a simulation of miniature golf developed by Artech Digital Entertainment and released by Accolade for the Commodore 64, MS-DOS, Family Computer (Famicom) and ZX Spectrum in 1987, and Apple IIGS in 1988. A version for the Nintendo Entertainment System based on the Famicom port was planned to be published by JVC Musical Industries in North America with a release in 1992, but it ultimately did not materialize.

== Gameplay ==
Mini-Putt is a miniature golf game in which up to players can choose compete across four different nine-hole courses: Traditional, Deluxe, Classic and Challenge. Players can either complete an entire course or practise individual holes. Each course features different obstacles and hazards, including bridges, water, windmills and animated objects.

The game is viewed from an overhead perspective, with a separate map displaying the layout of each hole. Players can aim their shots by placing their cursor in the desired position, as well using a power and accuracy meters to control the strength and direction of their putts. Directional arrows indicate slopes on the course, which affect the movement of the ball.

== Reception ==
The game was reviewed in 1988 in Dragon #131 by Hartley, Patricia, and Kirk Lesser in "The Role of Computers" column. The reviewers gave the game 3 out of 5 stars.

Zzap!64 awarded the Commodore 64 version 78%, praising its enjoyable gameplay, colourful graphics and variety of courses. However, the reviewers criticised the limited number of holes and the lengthy loading times of the cassette version, which required each hole to be loaded separately.

Compute! described the game as looking easy, but playing hard. They noted its various obstacles and the precision required to control shots. The reviewer criticised the limited documentation and expressed disappointment at the absence of additional courses.

Writing for the Finnish publication Pelit, Petri Teittinen praised the design of several courses and found the multiplayer experience considerably more enjoyable than playing alone. However, he criticised the game's limited humour and the loading times of the cassette version.

In a retrospective review for AllGame, Jonathan Sutyak praised the game's precise controls, visual presentation and course design, although he felt that additional courses featuring animated obstacles would have improved the experience.
