= The Train: Escape to Normandy =

1987 video game

- Developer: Artech Digital Entertainment
- Publisher: Accolade
- Platforms: Amstrad CPC, Commodore 64, MS-DOS, ZX Spectrum
- Release: 1987
- Genre: Action
- Mode: Single-player

The Train: Escape to Normandy is an action video game released by Accolade in 1987 and themed loosely on the motion picture The Train, starring Burt Lancaster. It was released for the Amstrad CPC, Commodore 64, ZX Spectrum, and IBM PC compatibles.

In the video game, the player assumes the role of a train hijacker who has commandeered a steam train to escape Nazi Germany during World War II. When the train is in motion, the player must maintain the correct speed, steam pressure and other operational parameters. Also, the player must attempt to shoot down Nazi fighter planes which occasionally strafe the train by aiming and firing anti-aircraft guns mounted to the engine. When the train sometimes stops briefly for resupply at various stations, the player must also provide cover fire against attackers in the station buildings for comrades resupplying the train.

== Reception ==
Computer Gaming World called The Train "a rousing action game". It criticized the graphics' quality as below Accolade's standards, but said that the train-engineering portions were excellent. A survey of strategy and war games gave it two stars out of five.

The Spanish magazine Microhobby valued the game with the following scores: Originality: 70% Graphics: 70% Motion: 70% Sound: 60% Difficulty: 80% Addiction: 90%
