= HardBall IV =

1994 video game

- DOS cover art
- Developer: MindSpan
- Publishers: Accolade (Note: Released under the Sport Accolade label.); Warner Interactive Entertainment Europe (MS-DOS, EU)
- Producer: Pam Levins
- Programmers: Jeff Sember; Mike Benna
- Artists: Dale Mauk; John Boechler; Karen Hinds
- Composer: Brian Shaw
- Series: HardBall!
- Platforms: DOS, Sega Genesis
- Release: DOS: NA: 1994; EU: 1995; Genesis: NA: June 1994; EU: July 15, 1994
- Genre: Sports
- Modes: Single-player, multiplayer

HardBall IV is a video game developed by MindSpan and published by Accolade for the Sega Genesis as HardBall '94 and later for DOS.

== Gameplay ==
HardBall IV is a baseball game featuring Super VGA computer graphics.

== Release ==
A port of HardBall IV for the Atari Jaguar was in development by High Voltage Software, but it was never released.

== Reception ==
Reception

Review scores
| Publication | Score |
|---|---|
| AllGame | 3.5/5 (GEN) |
| Computer Gaming World | 3.5/5 (PC) |
| Game Players | 85% (GEN) |
| GamePro | 4/5 (GEN) |
| Hyper | 90/100 (PC) |
| Mean Machines Sega | 64/100 (GEN) |
| Next Generation | 4/5 (PC) |
| PC Gamer (US) | 79% (PC) |
| PC Zone | 83/100 (PC) |
| Electronic Entertainment | 4/5 (PC) |
| Electronic Games | A− (GEN) |
| Flux | 8.5/10 (GEN) |
| PC Games (UK) | 65% (PC) |
| Sega Power | 68% (GEN) |
| VideoGames | 8/10 (GEN) |

Next Generation reviewed the PC version of the game, rating it four stars out of five, and stated that "you've got a top-notch simulation of America's favorite sport."
