= Mike Ditka Ultimate Football =

1991 video game

- Developer: Accolade
- Publisher: Accolade
- Platforms: IBM, Sega Genesis
- Release: 1991

Mike Ditka Ultimate Football is a 1991 video game published by Accolade.

== Gameplay ==
Mike Ditka Ultimate Football is a game in which the player can choose from all the available 28 professional teams, and can play one game at a time, or play through the full season, or just the playoffs.

== Reception ==
Reception

Review scores
Publication	Score
Aktueller Software Markt	10/12
Zero	90

Wallace Poulter reviewed the game for Computer Gaming World, and stated that "Mike Ditka Ultimate Football is a "Smash Mouth" entrant into the field. Its blend of quality graphics, playability and fun combines to form a superior product."

Clayton Walnum for Compute! praised the graphics, animation, sounds, and gameplay, proclaiming "Mike Ditka Ultimate Football scores a touchdown".

Patrick McCarthy for Zero complimented the replay facility and concluded that "It's right up there with Joe Montana - maybe even a bit better."
