= Power At Sea =

1988 video game

- European cover art
- Developer: Distinctive Software
- Publishers: EU: Accolade; NA: Accolade
- Composers: Kris Hatlelid; Patrick Payne
- Platform: Commodore 64
- Release: EU: 1988; NA: 1988
- Genre: Submarine simulation
- Mode: Single-player

Power At Sea is a video game developed by Distinctive Software and published by Accolade in 1988 for the Commodore 64.

== Gameplay ==
Power At Sea is a game in which the World War II Battle of Leyte Gulf is simulated, with the Japanese trying to capture the Pacific. The player commands a fleet consisting of a battleship, an aircraft carrier, and a troop ship, and is able to fire naval gun barrages against emplacements in caves and can direct the assault forces to take possession of beachheads.

== Reception ==
In 1988, Dragon gave the game 3 out of 5 stars. A 1991 Computer Gaming World survey of strategy and war games gave it one star out of five, criticizing the game's abridged order of battle and arcade combat.
