= Monte Carlo (video game) =

1987 video game

- Publisher: PBI Software
- Designers: Richard L. Seaborne; Jeff A. Lefferts
- Platform: Apple IIGS
- Release: 1987
- Genre: Simulation

Monte Carlo is a gambling simulation video game created for the Apple IIGS, created by PBI Software. It was programmed by Richard L. Seaborne and released in 1987.

== Description ==
Monte Carlo offered a number of traditional casino-style gambling games, selectable from the game's main screen. Games included:

- Baccarat
- Black Jack
- Craps
- Roulette
- Slots
- Trente et Quarante
- Video Poker

One or two players could play against the house using standard casino rules. At the beginning of the game, players are given $5000 in virtual money which they could bet in any amounts by dragging various colored chips to the betting areas of the various games. There were no set time limits or goals to the game; players could choose to "cash out" at any point, at which time the game would be finished and their money total—if large enough to qualify—would be saved on a list of "high rollers". The player would then have to begin again from the initial $5000 point. If at any point a player bet all his or her money and lost, the game would be over and the player would have to start again; the game did not allow negative balances.

Nowhere in the game was there any explanation or tutorial on how to play any of the games; players were expected to be familiar with the rules of the particular casino game being played.

== Reception ==
The game was reviewed in 1988 in Dragon #133 by Hartley, Patricia, and Kirk Lesser in "The Role of Computers" column. The reviewers gave the game 4 out of 5 stars.
