= Tower of Myraglen =

1987 video game

- Publisher: PBI Software
- Designers: Richard L. Seaborne; Jeff A. Lefferts
- Platform: Apple IIGS
- Release: 1987
- Genre: Role-playing video game
- Mode: Single-player

Tower of Myraglen is an adventure role-playing video game published by PBI Software. It was released for the Apple IIGS in 1987.

== Plot ==
The player character is a Knight of Justice sent by the King of Myraglen to retrieve the Medallion of Soul Stealing from the Tower of Myraglen.

== Reception ==
The game was reviewed in 1988 in Dragon #129 by Hartley, Patricia, and Kirk Lesser in "The Role of Computers" column. The reviewers gave the game 3½ stars.

Scott Mace, writing in the April 1988 issue of inCider, praised the game's atmospheric sound effects but criticized its comparatively simple graphics and cumbersome interface. He considered the game less impressive than contemporary role-playing games such as The Bard's Tale, noting that its top-down perspective and menu-based controls limited its presentation and ease of use.

David Langendoen of Family Computing praised the game's colorful graphics, sound effects and balance between combat and puzzles, describing the challenge as engaging without being excessively frustrating. However, he criticized the difficulty of opening the game's plastic packaging.
