= WarpSpeed =

1992 video game

- Super NES cover art
- Developer: Accolade, Inc.
- Publishers: Accolade, Inc.
- Designers: Bob Smith; David Friedland
- Programmers: Bob Smith; Russell Borogove
- Platforms: Super NES, Genesis/Mega Drive
- Release: Super NES: NA: December 1992; Genesis/Mega Drive: NA: 1993; EU: 1993
- Genre: Space flight simulator
- Mode: Single-player

WarpSpeed is a 1992 space flight simulator video game developed and published by Accolade for the Super Nintendo Entertainment System and Sega Genesis.

== Gameplay ==
The premise of WarpSpeed is to rid the current scenario of enemy fighters. Scenarios make use of quadrants in which the player flies sector by sector or uses faster-than-light travel to warp from sector to sector. Most space flight consists of navigating asteroid fields, although some sectors contain mines that must be destroyed. During the course of gameplay, the player receives transmissions regarding various topics, consisting of clearing out minefields to travelling to a specific sector to obtain some manner of space technology before the enemy reaches it. Other transmissions are distress signals from space stations asking for assistance from approaching enemy fighters.

== Features ==
WarpSpeed features pseudo 3D gameplay, allowing the player to supposedly travel in 360 degrees in flight; however, the quadrant is laid out in a 2-D configuration so that the player only really travels along an X-axis and a Y-axis. Wormholes are also located in various quadrants and allow transport to other quadrants; however, they slowly deplete the vessel's warp drive reserves.

The game allows four different space craft for the player to use, each with progressively stronger weapons. The players accumulated game score eventually allows the player to automatically upgrade to the next available craft. The game also features an award system based on the number of points that players have gained from destroying enemy fighters to achieving other goals.

The game also features a damage system that affects the performance of the player's craft. For instance, if the damage control screen indicates the players' engines have been damaged, their maximum speed will decrease; if their weapons system has taken damage, the players' weapons will not always fire correctly, etc.

Throughout the quadrant, there may be one or multiple space stations for the player to dock with, refuel and replenish their ship's systems, ammunition, and warp drive reserves. These stations are critical to the player and if they are lost, they can not be replaced.

If the players craft suffers too much damage, the vessel will be destroyed. The player has three lives to complete the chosen scenario. If the player loses all three lives, the game is over.
