= Apollo 18: Mission to the Moon =

1987 simulation video game

- Developer: Artech
- Publisher: Accolade
- Platforms: Commodore 64, MS-DOS
- Release: 1987: C64; 1988: MS-DOS
- Genre: Simulation

Apollo 18: Mission to the Moon is a simulation video game developed by Canadian studio Artech and published in 1987 for the Commodore 64 by Accolade. A version for MS-DOS was released in 1988.

== Gameplay ==
Apollo 18: Mission to the Moon is a game in which an Apollo program mission is re-created all the way from countdown at the beginning to splashdown at the end.

== Reception ==
David M. Wilson reviewed the game for Computer Gaming World, and stated that "One thing is for sure, gamers who spend their money on this game will not spend their time in the light of the silvery moon or moonlighting, they will be at their computers."
