= Deadlock: Planetary Conquest =

1996 video game

- Developer: Accolade
- Publishers: NA: Accolade; EU: Warner Interactive Europe
- Platforms: Windows, Mac
- Release: NA: August 28, 1996; EU: 1996
- Genre: Turn-based strategy
- Modes: Single-player, multiplayer

Deadlock: Planetary Conquest is a turn-based strategy computer game by Accolade. The game was officially released in 1996. The story revolves around eight races' struggle for control over the planet Gallius IV, which came to a deadlock.

Tommo purchased the rights to Deadlock in 2015, and has since published it under the Retroism brand.

== Plot ==
Expeditions sent by the governments of eight races came to orbit around Gallius IV. An armed conflict ensued as each race was determined to capture the planet for its own purposes. To avoid an intergalactic war, as well as to prevent the disputed planet from being accidentally destroyed by the space fleets battling around it, a treaty called The Compact of Gallius IV was signed by seven of the eight races. Each of the seven would deploy five hundred lightly armed colonists to the planet, who would then each begin developing a colony. No restrictions were put on weapons developed and used by the colonies, as opposed to the colonists only being allowed to bring laser pistols with them. The colony to drive all others off the planet's surface, or to construct a pre-set number of cities, would claim the planet for its leaders. The recently discovered and neutral Tolnans serve as advisers to everyone, while the Skirineen operate the local black market.

== Reception ==
Deadlock sold above 100,000 units in its initial two months, and was a commercial success. The game ranked fourth on PC Data's list of Top Retail PC Games for September 1996.

== Sequel ==
The sequel, Deadlock II: Shrine Wars, offered slight changes in gameplay, less ability to micromanage, identical graphics, and a single-player campaign. The game interface also changed significantly.
