= Slave Zero =

1999 video game

- North American cover art
- Developer: Infogrames North America
- Publishers: NA: Infogrames North America; EU: Infogrames Multimedia
- Director: Sean Vesce
- Producer: Matthew J. Powers
- Designers: Jeffrey Gregg; Mike Wikan; Jason Weesner
- Artist: Ken Capelli
- Writer: Margaret Stohl
- Composer: Randy Atkins
- Engine: Ecstasy Engine
- Platforms: Microsoft Windows, Dreamcast
- Release: NA: November 17, 1999; EU: March 24, 2000
- Genre: Third-person shooter
- Modes: Single-player, multiplayer

Slave Zero is a 1999 action video game developed and published by Infogrames North America for Dreamcast, Windows 95, and Windows 98.

While the game was originally designed to work with Windows 95 and Windows 98, a fan following had developed a number of CD cracks in order to make the game compatible on newer systems. While this allowed the software to become playable, it still required that the owner possess the original software. The PC version uses the Ecstasy Engine. Tommo purchased the rights to the game and digitally published it through its Retroism brand in 2015. On March 25, 2014, Retroism re-released the game on GOG.com and, together with Night Dive Studios, to Steam.

In June 2022, publisher Ziggurat Interactive (who purchased the rights to Slave Zero) announced a prequel titled Slave Zero X. It was released on February 21, 2024 for the PlayStation 5, Xbox Series, PlayStation 4, Xbox One, Nintendo Switch and PC.

== Plot ==
Taking place 500 years in the future, the game tells the story of Lu Chen, a sinister world overlord more commonly known as the SovKhan, who rules the Earth from a massive complex called Megacity S1-9. The only resistance to the SovKhan is from an ancient order of warriors known only as the Guardians. The SovKhan's army is nearly invincible as it is, and it is growing by the day, his most powerful units being 60-foot-tall humanoid robots called "Slaves". The Slaves themselves are grown from a combination of artificially created cybernetic embryos and a mysterious compound called NTR95879, referred to as "dark matter" by the Guardians. Now the Guardians' only hope of overthrowing the SovKhan and his cybernetic army lies in a single captured Slave unit, which will have the mind of a specially trained Guardian agent permanently downloaded into it. The game follows "Slave Zero" as he wages war against the SovKhan's forces throughout every part of Megacity S1-9.

== Reception ==
Reception

Aggregate score
Aggregator	Score	
Aggregator	Dreamcast	PC
GameRankings	58%	72%

Review scores
Publication	Score	
Publication	Dreamcast	PC
Computer Games Strategy Plus	N/A	4/5
Computer Gaming World	N/A	3/5
Electronic Gaming Monthly	4.375/10	N/A
Eurogamer	6/10	N/A
Game Informer	6.25/10	N/A
GameFan	(J.W.) 79% (F.M.) 40%	80%
GamePro	4/5	N/A
GameRevolution	C+	B
GameSpot	7.2/10	6.9/10
GameSpy	(P.D.) 3.5/10; 35%	70%
IGN	3.2/10	8/10
Next Generation	3/5	N/A
PC Accelerator	N/A	6/10
PC Gamer (US)	N/A	68%
Maxim	N/A	4/5
USA Today	4/4	N/A

The game received mixed or average reviews according to the review aggregation website GameRankings. GameSpot and IGN both praised the PC version's selection of weapon upgrades, and GameSpot also argued that the boss battles are both unique and memorable.

GameSpot, GameRevolution, and IGN all criticized the game's failure to create any sense of being a giant robot on the rampage in a city, as well as the lack of combat depth or replay value. IGN and GameRevolution additionally criticized the Dreamcast version for its extremely poor frame rate, lack of in-game music, and conspicuous game-crashing bugs. Jeff Lundrigan of NextGen said that the same console version "may not be to everyone's taste, but it does offer a different sort of challenge for those so inclined."

Damien Thorpe of AllGame gave the Dreamcast version three-and-a-half stars out of five, saying that it "has its flaws, but turns out to be a fun game." Joel Durham of the same website gave the PC version three stars out of five, saying, "The more you play Slave Zero, the less appealing it is. [...] You can come pretty close to experiencing Slave Zero to its fullest -- for free -- by playing the demo thirty times. If you get tired of it, just think of the money you saved."

== Legacy ==
In June 2022, Ziggurat Interactive (owners of franchises such as BloodRayne, KKnD, Uprising, among others) announced a prequel to the original Slave Zero. Titled Slave Zero X, the game's genre was described as a side-scrolling hack-and-slash as opposed to the original game's third-person shooter premise. It was also announced that SungWon Cho and Anjali Kunapaneni were added to the game's cast. Slave Zero X was released on February 21, 2024 for the PlayStation 5, Xbox Series, PlayStation 4, Xbox One, Nintendo Switch, and PC. It tells the story of Shou, a member of the Guardians resistance group, who steals the group's salvaged Slave Bio-Armor "X" and sets out to slay the tyrannical SovKhan and his Five Calamities.

In addition to Slave Zero X, Ziggurat partnered with Ironwood Software and Poppy Works for Slave Zero X: Episode Enyo, a total conversion for the first-person shooter game Quake, which features Enyo, one of the antagonists of Slave Zero X as the playable character. It was confirmed to be part of the series' canon as it took place prior to the events of Slave Zero X.
