= Artech Digital Entertainment =

Video game developer company

- Trade name: Artech Studios
- Type: Private
- Founded: 1982
- Founders: Rick Banks; Paul Butler; Steve Armstrong
- Defunct: December 31, 2011; 14 years ago
- Fate: Disbanded
- Headquarters: Ottawa, Ontario, Canada
- Number of employees: 60+ (as of 2006)

Artech Digital Entertainment was a video game developer formed in 1982 in Ottawa, Ontario, Canada. Also known as Artech Studios, the company developed games such as Raze's Hell, Monopoly, Jeopardy!, Wheel of Fortune, and Q*bert.

The company has developed games for the ColecoVision, Commodore 64, Amiga, Nabu Network, Genesis, PlayStation, PlayStation 2, Xbox, Xbox 360,Mac, MS-DOS, and Windows They also developed a series of interactive games designed for standard DVD players.

Artech Studios shut down in December 2011.

== Games ==
=== Nabu Network ===
- Zot!
- Wiztype
- MacBeth
- Skiing!
- Astro Lander
- BC Matchup

=== Commodore 64 ===
- Ace of Aces
- BC's Quest for Tires
- B.C. II: Grog's Revenge
- Wiz Math
- The Dam Busters
- Fight Night
- Desert Fox
- Killed Until Dead
- Deceptor
- The Train: Escape to Normandy
- Apollo 18: Mission to the Moon
- Mean 18
- Rack 'Em
- Mental Blocks

=== ColecoVision ===
- BC's Quest for Tires

=== ZX Spectrum ===
- B.C. II: Grog's Revenge

=== Amiga ===
- Heat Wave
- Theatre of War
- Patriot
- Megafortress: The Flight of the Old Dog
- Blue Angels: Formation Flight Simulation
- Blue Max
- Das Boot
- Mental Blocks

=== Genesis ===
- BreakThru! (Sega Channel)
- Dark Castle
- Motocross Championship (32X)
- Crystal's Pony Tale

=== Super NES ===
- BreakThru!

=== Mac ===
- Theatre of War
- Patriot
- U.F.O.s

=== MS-DOS ===
- Heat Wave: Offshore Superboat Racing
- Fight Night
- The Train: Escape to Normandy
- Mean 18
- Rack 'Em
- Serve and Volley
- Blue Angels
- Mental Blocks
- Blue Max: Aces of the Great War
- Das Boot
- Megafortress
- Theatre of War
- Patriot
- Wild Science Arcade
- Mystery at the Museums
- Rock and Bach
- Director's Lab
- Wild Board Games
- Wild Card Games
- Adventures with Edison
- Play Math
- Wild Ride
- Super Putt
- UFOs - Gnap
- Medieval Times
- Moto Extreme
- Monopoly Star Wars
- Celtica
- Thunder Chrome
- ARA
- Star Wars Playset
- Wheel of Fortune
- Jeopardy!
- Guess Who?
- Family Feud
- Family Fortunes
- Wheel of Fortune 2nd Edition
- Jeopardy 2nd Edition
- Stanley's Tiger Tales
- Music Mix Studio
- Cinderella's Castle Builder

=== Windows ===
- Arcade Mania
- Super Putt
- Q*Bert
- Monopoly
- My Little Pony: Friendship Gardens
- Trivial Pursuit Unhinged
- Friends: The One with All the Trivia
- The Undergarden
- Aces of the Galaxy
- I Spy Fun House
- U.F.O.s
- Jeopardy 2003
- Wheel of Fortune 2003
- Hello Kitty Cutie World
- Stanley Wild for Sharks
- Stanley Tiger Tales
- Tonka Search and Rescue 2
- Power Rangers Ninja Storm

=== PlayStation ===
- Wheel of Fortune
- Jeopardy!
- Q*Bert
- Family Feud
- Wheel of Fortune 2nd Edition
- Jeopardy 2nd Edition

=== PlayStation 2 ===
- Wheel of Fortune PS2
- Jeopardy PS2
- Trivial Pursuit Unhinged
- Friends: The One with All the Trivia

=== Xbox ===
- Trivial Pursuit Unhinged
- Raze's Hell

=== DVD ===
- Show Me the Wild
- Time Troopers
- Trivial Pursuit: Lord of the Rings
- Scholastic Read with Me DVD!
- Clue
- Candyland
- Clifford/Goosebumps/I-Spy
- Twister Dance
- Monopoly Tropical Tycoon

=== Xbox 360 ===
- Boogie Bunnies
- Aces of the Galaxy
- The Undergarden

=== PlayStation 3 ===
- The Undergarden
