= Card Sharks (video game) =

1988 playing card video game

- Developer(s): Accolade
- Publisher(s): Accolade
- Designer(s): Mike Lorenzen
- Platform(s): Commodore 64
- Release: 1988
- Genre(s): Cards

Card Sharks is a 1988 game for the Commodore 64 developed and published by Accolade. It was designed by Mike Lorezen.

== Gameplay ==
The player can choose between three card games:

1. Poker with three different variations: Five card draw, Seven card stud, Texas hold'em.
2. Hearts
3. Blackjack

Depending the chosen game the player selects up to three opponents. Besides three fictional characters (Luigi, Lady and Milton), the player can select Mikhail Gorbachev, Ronald Reagan, and Margaret Thatcher. The characters comment the game situation in a humorous way.
