= Don't Go Alone =

1989 video game

- Developer(s): Sterling Silver Software
- Publisher(s): Accolade
- Platform(s): MS-DOS
- Release: 1989
- Genre(s): Role-playing, horror

Don't Go Alone is a role-playing video game for MS-DOS published in 1989 by Accolade. Players search the ten levels of an old monster-filled house to find and kill the evil Ancient One.

== Reception ==
Scorpia reviewed the game for Computer Gaming World, and stated that "the game is mainly an exercise in monster-mash, although on a more limited scale than most CRPG's. The simple interface, very nice auto-mapping, balanced combat, interesting monster graphics, formula components, and unique use of fear are all pluses, but these are overshadowed by the large minus of having little substantive to do in the game. Essentially, this game is best for those with little or no experience with CRPG's."
