= HardBall 6 =

1998 sports video game

- Cover art featuring Ken Caminiti
- Developer: MindSpan
- Publisher: Accolade
- Platforms: Microsoft Windows, PlayStation
- Release: Windows: NA: April 15, 1998; 2000 Edition: NA: March 24, 1999; PlayStation: NA: November 18, 1998
- Genre: Sports
- Modes: Single-player, multiplayer

HardBall 6, also known as HardBall 99 for the PlayStation version, is a baseball video game developed by MindSpan and published by Accolade for Microsoft Windows and PlayStation in 1998. A 2000 Edition was released for Windows only in 1999.

== Gameplay ==
Unlike its predecessors, the game was licensed by Major League Baseball in addition to the Major League Players Association license, so that not only the players but also the teams are represented by their real names. New features of the game include a multi-season mode and amateur player drafting. HardBall 6 was the first baseball game to support MPlayer.com, an online multiplayer service.

== Development ==
Unlike the previous games in the series, the game was developed in two years instead of one, to allow ample time for a new three-dimensional video game engine. The game was originally due for release in the second quarter of 1997, with the work on the three-dimensional engine delaying it for a year.

The game's voice commentator is Greg Papa, who replaced Al Michaels. The game's cover features San Diego Padres third baseman Ken Caminiti.

== Reception ==
Reception

Aggregate score
Aggregator	Score	
Aggregator	PC	PS
GameRankings	68% (2000) 51%	64%

Review scores
Publication	Score	
Publication	PC	PS
CNET Gamecenter	7/10 (2000) 4/10	8/10
Computer Gaming World	2.5/5	N/A
Game Informer	N/A	2/10
GamePro	2/5	3/5
GameRevolution	C−	N/A
GameSpot	7.1/10	5.4/10
IGN	6/10	N/A
PC Gamer (US)	67%	N/A

HardBall 6, its 2000 Edition, and HardBall 99 received "mixed" reviews according to the review aggregation website GameRankings.
