= Blue Angels: Formation Flight Simulation =

1989 video game

- Developer: Artech Digital Entertainment
- Publisher: Accolade
- Platforms: Amiga, Atari ST, Commodore 64, MS-DOS
- Release: WW: 1989
- Genre: Flight simulation

Blue Angels: Formation Flight Simulation is a flight simulation video game developed by Artech and published by Accolade. It was released in 1989 for Amiga, Atari ST, Commodore 64, and MS-DOS.

== Gameplay ==
Blue Angels is a flight simulator.

== Reception ==
Lt. H. E. Dille reviewed the game for Computer Gaming World, and stated that "Blue Angels deserves a fair amount of consideration based on novelty alone. As such, the product is recommended, with [...] reservations, to PC pilots seeking a change of pace."

In 1996, Computer Gaming World declared Blue Angels the 3rd-worst computer game ever released.
