= Rob Paulsen =

American voice actor (born 1956)

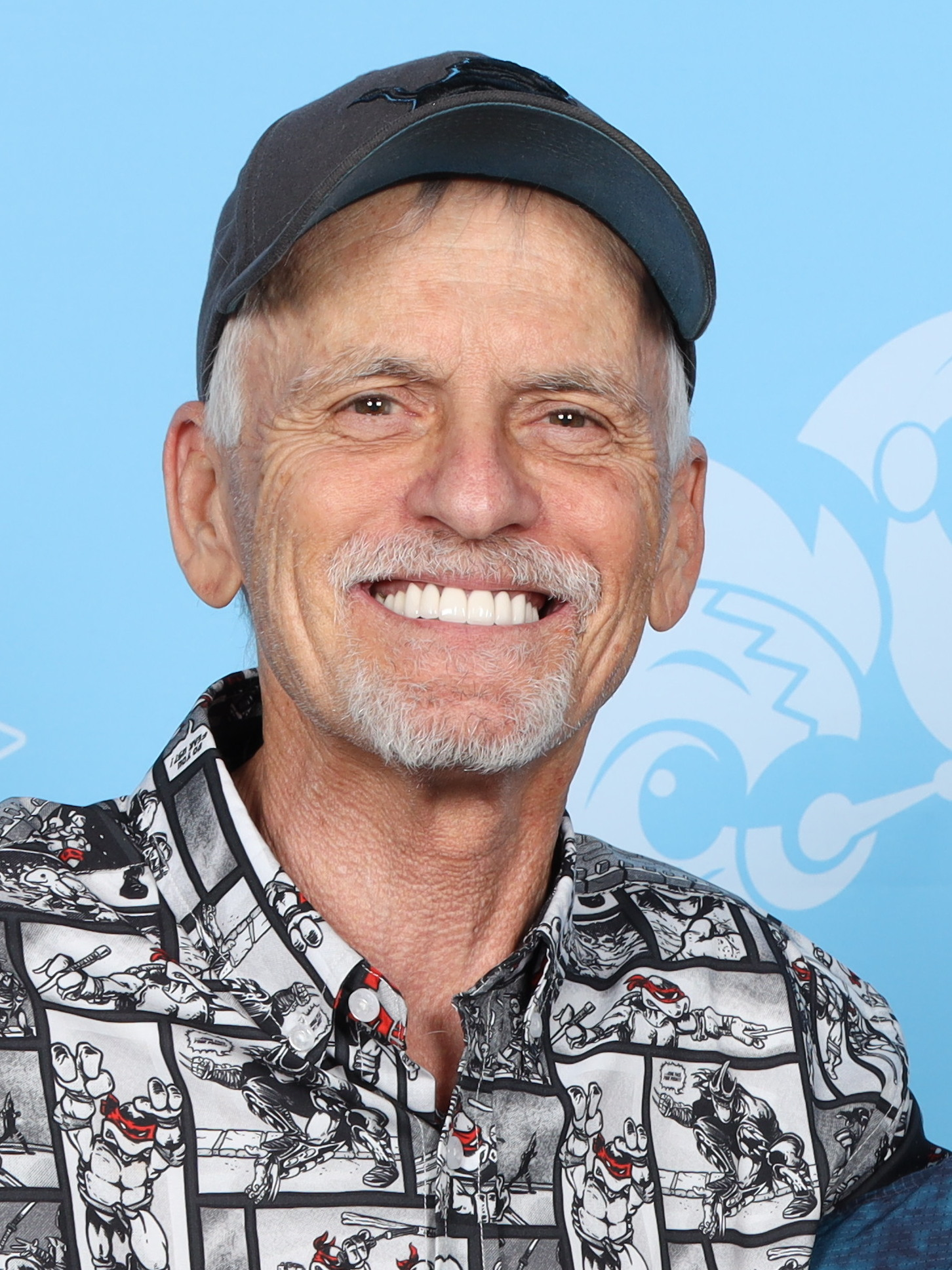
- Paulsen in 2024
- Born: Robert Frederick Paulsen III; March 11, 1956 (age 70); Detroit, Michigan, U.S.
- Education: University of Michigan-Flint
- Occupations: Voice actor; voice director
- Years active: 1978–present
- Spouses: Carol Anne Schnarr (m. 1979; div. 1982) Parrish Todd (m. 1983)
- Children: 1
- Website: robpaulsenvoice.com

Robert Frederick Paulsen III (born March 11, 1956) is an American voice actor and voice director, known for his roles in numerous animated television series and films. He received a Daytime Emmy Award for Outstanding Performer in an Animated Program and three Annie Awards for his role as both Yakko and Pinky in the Animaniacs franchise. His other voice roles include: Hadji in The New Adventures of Jonny Quest (1986–1987) and The Real Adventures of Jonny Quest (1996–1997); Raphael in Teenage Mutant Ninja Turtles (1987–1996); Donatello in Teenage Mutant Ninja Turtles (2012–2017); P.J. Pete in Goof Troop (1992), A Goofy Movie (1995), and An Extremely Goofy Movie (2000); Toodles in Mickey Mouse Clubhouse (2006–2016); Mark Chang in The Fairly OddParents (2001–2017); Brick and Boomer in The Powerpuff Girls (1998–2005); Major Glory in Dexter's Laboratory (1996–2003); Carl Wheezer in Jimmy Neutron: Boy Genius (2001) and its TV series (2002–2006); Jaq in Cinderella II: Dreams Come True (2002) and Cinderella III: A Twist in Time (2007); and Mac in The Looney Tunes Show (2011–2013) and Looney Tunes: Rabbits Run (2015). Paulsen published his memoir Voice Lessons: How a Couple of Ninja Turtles, Pinky, and an Animaniac Saved My Life in 2019.

== Early life ==
Robert Frederick Paulsen III was born in Detroit, Michigan, on March 11, 1956. He grew up in Grand Blanc, Michigan, where he graduated from Grand Blanc High School in 1974. He sang in choirs throughout his youth and adolescence and began performing in plays in school, but his childhood idol was ice hockey player Gordie Howe, and he considered the arts to be a secondary career choice due to his primary interest in becoming a National Hockey League (NHL) player. Paulsen credits Peter Sellers and Monty Python as major influences. He briefly attended the University of Michigan-Flint, but later dropped out and moved to Los Angeles in 1978 to pursue a career in show business, much to the disapproval of his father, who was a doctor and wanted Paulsen to pursue a more realistic career. He worked his first job as a musician, before pursuing voice acting full time.

== Career ==
Paulsen's first voice acting role came in 1983 with the mini-series G.I. Joe: A Real American Hero, where he played Snow Job and Tripwire. A few years later, his career launched into more roles such as Cobra Slavemaster and reprising Snow Job and Tripwire on G.I. Joe, Corky on The Snorks, Marco Smurf on the later seasons of The Smurfs, Boober in Fraggle Rock, Hadji in The New Adventures of Jonny Quest and the title character Saber Rider and the villain Jesse Blue on Saber Rider and the Star Sheriffs.

During the 1980s, Paulsen also explored the field of live action films. His first film was Eyes of Fire in 1983. He played supporting roles in Body Double, Stewardess School, Warlock, and Mutant on the Bounty. He appeared in television shows during this time as well, such as MacGyver and St. Elsewhere. Paulsen became more prevalent in the world of advertising as well. In the 1980s, he was the announcer for the sitcom Cheers and continued to secure roles as an announcer. He appeared as the voice of Mr. Opportunity, spokesman of Honda commercials on TV and radio, the announcer for Buffalo Dick's Radio Ranch, and the spokesman for Lucky Stores, a West Coast grocery store chain, before it was acquired by Albertsons in 1998. He provided the voice of Dog in the Taco Bell kids meal commercials from 1996 to mid-1997, with Eddie Deezen as the voice of Nacho the cat.

However, Paulsen's most famous advertising role was in the original commercial of the now ubiquitous Got Milk? campaign. The famous commercial, Who shot Alexander Hamilton in that famous duel?, aired in 1993, and launched the Got Milk? campaign into a successful enterprise. Paulsen continues to be one of the most sought-after commercial voice actors in the industry. He can be currently heard as the voice of singing Mr. Mini-Wheat in the Mini-Wheats commercials in Canada.

From 1987 to 1995, Paulsen voiced Raphael and various supporting characters in the original 1987 Teenage Mutant Ninja Turtles series. Originally starting as a five-part miniseries, the series continued for ten seasons and 193 episodes. It was a great success and became an instant pop culture symbol. Paulsen has said that Raphael's voice is very similar to his natural voice.

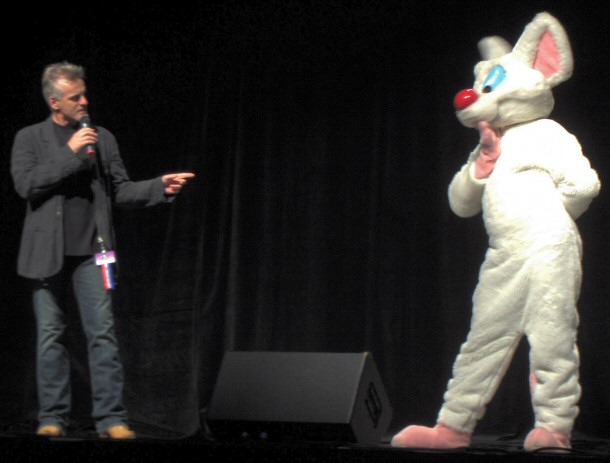
Paulsen with Pinky at Anthrocon 2007

Throughout the early 1990s, Paulsen continued to co-star in animated series, which allowed him to branch further into radio and television announcements, and came with the consequence of dropping live action acting from his repertoire. In 1993, he voiced "Antoine Depardieu" in ABC's series Sonic the Hedgehog, and "Arthur", an insecure accountant in a moth costume (wings included), in the superhero series The Tick in 1995, replacing Micky Dolenz, who had originally played Arthur.

In 1993, he starred as the title character in both Mighty Max and The Mask. Also at this time, he starred in what became one of his most popular roles, Yakko Warner of Animaniacs. Paulsen also provided the voice of Pinky from both Animaniacs and its spin-off Pinky and the Brain, a show which won him several Annie Awards and a Daytime Emmy in 1999. At around the same time, Paulsen provided his voice for Accolade's computer game star, Bubsy Bobcat, in the television pilot Bubsy in 1993. He also did a number of characters in Tiny Toon Adventures, including "Fowlmouth", "Arnold the Pit Bull", and "Concord Condor". In the direct-to-video film Tiny Toon Adventures: How I Spent My Vacation, he did the voices for Banjo Possum, Mr. Hitcher (who would also appear in other episodes), and Johnny Pew. Paulsen reprised his voice roles as Yakko and Pinky for the Animaniacs revival, which ran for three seasons on Hulu from 2020 to 2023.

Paulsen has also provided voices for numerous other characters, including Steelbeak in Darkwing Duck, Brick and Boomer in The Powerpuff Girls, Experiment 625 / Reuben and several of Jumba Jookiba's other genetic experiments in Lilo & Stitch: The Series and its film Leroy & Stitch, Atchan in Hi Hi Puffy AmiYumi, Spooky the Tuff Little Ghost in The Spooktacular New Adventures of Casper, Ogden O. Ostrich in Channel Umptee-3, Hathi in Jungle Cubs, Jack Fenton, The Box Ghost, Nicolai Technus, and The Vulture Ghosts in Danny Phantom, Carl Wheezer, Butch and Skeet in The Adventures of Jimmy Neutron, Boy Genius, Mark Chang, his father King Grippulon, Happy Peppy Gary, and Bucky McBadbat in The Fairly OddParents, Peck the Rooster in Barnyard and Back at the Barnyard, and Gordon in Catscratch.

He was also the voice of Rothchild in the early episodes of Samurai Jack. Additionally, Paulsen provided the voice of P.J. Pete in Goof Troop, A Goofy Movie, and An Extremely Goofy Movie, as well as the voices of Ratchet and Dr. Debolt in the TaleSpin pilot television film Plunder & Lightning. He also did the voices of Boober Fraggle, Sprocket, and Marjory the Trash Heap in the animated version of Fraggle Rock, as well as Gwizdo in the Dragon Hunters film.

He also voiced Zeek and Joshua in K10C: Kids' Ten Commandments, Rude Dog in Rude Dog and the Dweebs, and Archie the Raccoon, A.K.A. Ze Archer, in "Mask of the Raccoon" on The Penguins of Madagascar. and also provided the voices of 2T Fru-T and Mike Ellis in the 2001 cartoon series Butt-Ugly Martians.

He portrayed the voice of Chomper and Strut in The Land Before Time II: The Great Valley Adventure, Spike and Rinkus in The Land Before Time sequels and Spike in the TV series, but Spike was played anonymously in the original The Land Before Time. Paulsen also played Mo in The Land Before Time IX: Journey to Big Water. Paulsen also voiced the robot "D.E.C.K.S." in the early 1990s TV series Wake, Rattle, and Roll. Paulsen also voiced Prescott A. Wentworth III in the Jem episode The Fan. Paulsen also played Antoine Depardieu in Sonic the Hedgehog.

Paulsen was best known to Transformers fans as the voices of the Autobots Air Raid, Chase, Haywire, Fastlane and Slingshot in The Transformers.

Paulsen has voiced characters in video games such as Doom 3. He played Fluffy the Chinese-crested dog in 102 Dalmatians: Puppies to the Rescue, Bubsy in Bubsy II and Bubsy in Fractured Furry Tales (1994), an Irish pub landlord in the 1996 video game Toonstruck, and a floating talking skull named Morte in Planescape: Torment, as well as Anomen Delryn in Baldur's Gate II: Shadows of Amn and Gray Fox in Metal Gear Solid: The Twin Snakes and both Super Smash Bros. Brawl and Super Smash Bros. Ultimate as an Assist Trophy. He provided the voice for Erik the Swift of The Lost Vikings in its second installment. He portrayed Tobli and Lian Ronso in the English version of Square Enix's Final Fantasy X-2 and has played the lead character in Bubsy. Although an extremely minor role, Paulsen has also done the voice for the Greek soldiers in God of War. He voiced Jaq and The Grand Duke from the Cinderella world in Square Enix's and Disney's Kingdom Hearts Birth by Sleep.

In the video game The Nightmare Before Christmas: Oogie's Revenge, he did the voice of Igor. He also reprised his role as Yakko Warner, Dr. Otto Scratchansniff, and Pinky in Animaniacs: The Great Edgar Hunt. Rob Paulsen voiced the lead character, Lazarus Jones, in the PS2 game Ghosthunter. Rob also voiced Alfredo Fettuccini, Bob the Ghost Pirate, Lookout and Ghost Priest in The Secret of Monkey Island: Special Edition. He voiced the Fox and the Mouse in the Green Eggs and Ham PC game. He also voiced Tlaloc in Tak and the Power of Juju. He has voiced the Riddler in Lego Batman 2: DC Super Heroes, a role he reprised in Lego Batman: The Movie – DC Super Heroes Unite. Rob is the voice of talking alien dog Beak-Beak in Armikrog. Paulsen also voices Smash Hit in Skylanders: SuperChargers and Skylanders: Imaginators.

Paulsen is also the off-camera voice of the syndicated television series Funniest Pets & People, which is seen on Superstation WGN and other television stations throughout the United States and abroad.

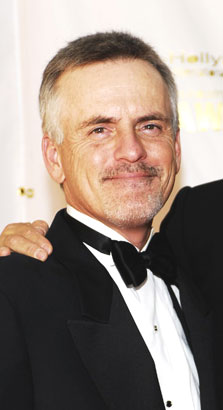
Paulsen at the 2006 Annie Awards

It was not long before Paulsen returned to Warner Bros. Animation, which had diverged into a new era of television serials (following what is sometimes referred to as the "Silver Age of Animation"). Paulsen appeared as Rev Runner of the new show Loonatics Unleashed and starred in Coconut Fred's Fruit Salad Island. He was also the voice of the character Squeeky on the TV show Danger Rangers. He voiced "Ichabeezer", Bacon Bill, Motato, Beau Rockley, Captain Mike, Tom Celeriac (a play on Tom Selleck), and other countless voices in VeggieTales in the House for Netflix. Paulsen also provides the voice for the Honda character Mr. Opportunity. In the Rob Zombie animated film, The Haunted World of El Superbeasto, Paulsen voiced the characters "El Gato" and "Commandant Hess", among some others. He also voiced Ditto, Rhomboid Vreedle, Baz-El, and Magister Patelliday in the Ben 10 franchise.

Beginning in 2001, Paulsen was the voice of Disney character José Carioca until he stepped down from the role in June 2020, announcing that he would no longer play characters of color. He became the new voice of Prince Eric of Disney's The Little Mermaid franchise beginning with the film The Little Mermaid II: Return to the Sea since Christopher Daniel Barnes failed to reprise the role in 2000, though Barnes did return to voice the character in the Kingdom Hearts series and in Gameloft's Disney video games. Additionally, he voiced Toodles in Mickey Mouse Clubhouse, Peck in Back at the Barnyard, various characters in The Replacements, and Bobble in the Tinker Bell films. Paulsen also played the titular character for an animated web series based on the video game Bravoman for Namco Bandai's ShiftyLook division.

He returned to the franchise as Donatello for the 2012 Teenage Mutant Ninja Turtles series on Nickelodeon, which ran for five seasons and 124 episodes from September 29, 2012, until November 12, 2017. He also reprised his role as 1987 Raphael in the multiple 1987/2012 crossover episodes.

Paulsen served as the voice director for the subsequent series, Rise of the Teenage Mutant Ninja Turtles, which premiered in July 2018.

== Awards and nominations ==
Paulsen has been nominated for an Annie Award for his role of Pinky for 4 consecutive years, which he won in 1996, 1997, and 1999. In 1999, he also won the Daytime Emmy Award for voicing Pinky. In 2004, he was nominated for his role of the Troubadour in Mickey, Donald, Goofy: The Three Musketeers, and in 2005, he was nominated for his role in The Happy Elf.

At the 2nd Children's and Family Emmy Awards in 2023, he was nominated for the Children's and Family Emmy Award for Outstanding Voice Performance in an Animated Program for his role in Animaniacs.

== Public appearances ==
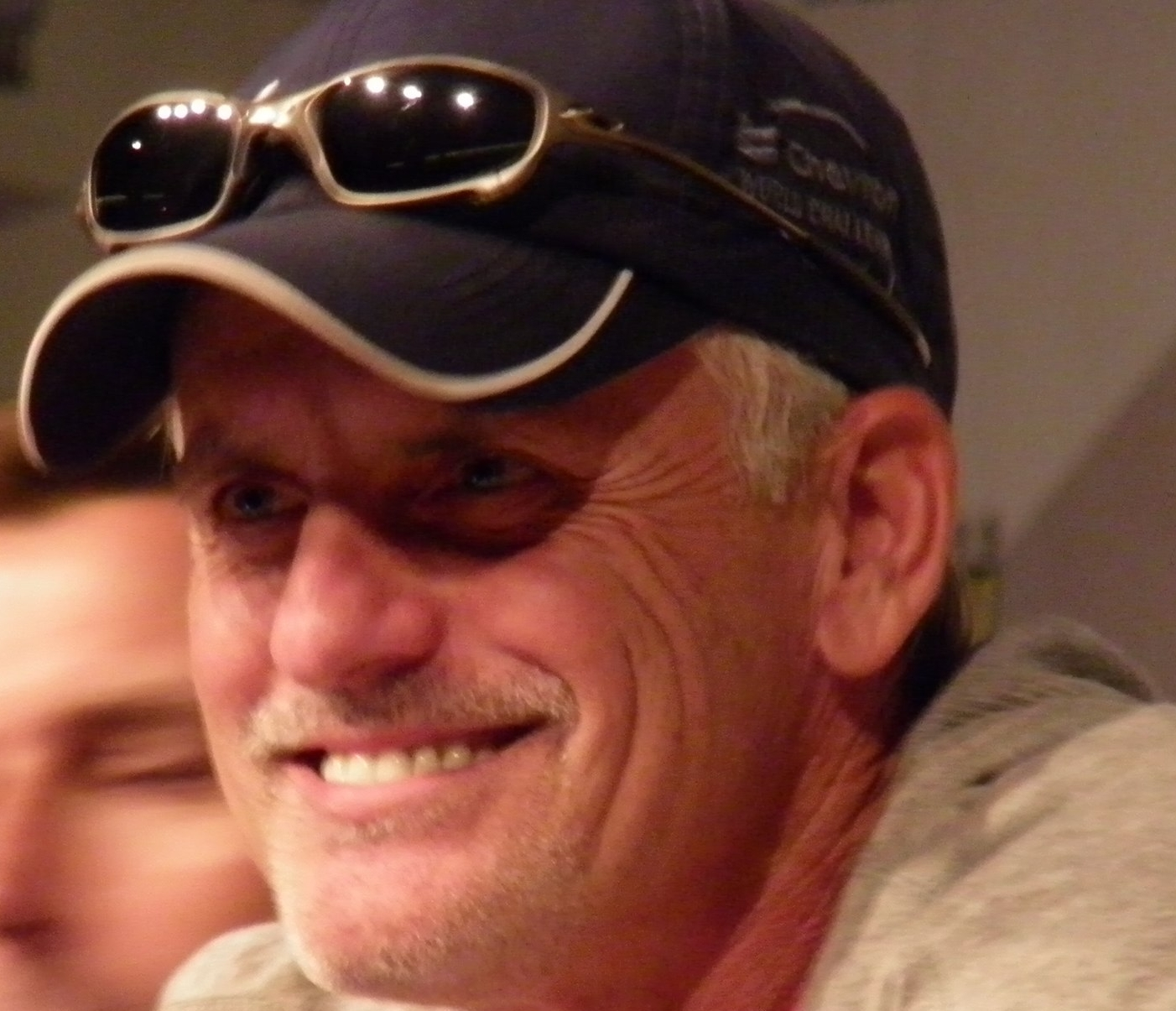
Paulsen at the 2011 San Diego Comic-Con

Paulsen has been a regular industry guest and featured panelist at San Diego Comic-Con. He has also appeared at animation industry-related events, such as the World Animation Celebration Online in 1998, among many others. He has also been a guest at several anime conventions, including JACON, Mikomicon, and Anime Overdose. Paulsen was a guest of honor at Anthrocon in 2007. He has recently started doing "Rob Paulsen Live" seminars across the U.S. to talk of his career, sign autographs, and talk with fans. Sometimes, people in attendance would request him to sing the famous Yakko's World number, where he sings all the nations of the world with his Yakko voice in a fast-paced delivery without rehearsing.

In May 2011, working with social media and web producer Chris Pope, Paulsen rolled out a new website RobPaulsenLive.com, as well as a weekly audio podcast called Talkin' Toons with Rob Paulsen, which started out being managed and deployed by The Tech Jives Network, before moving to be part of Nerdist Industries' Nerdist Podcast Network. Some episodes were recorded before a live audience at The Improv in Hollywood, California, while later ones were recorded at the Nerdist Showroom. The show is on indefinite hiatus following the March 23, 2019 episode with Dante Basco.

In June 2011, Paulsen made announcements that he was taking his show on the road with his "Lots of laughs and autographs" tour. Working closely with a team that included Chris Pope, his publicist, and others he made his first successful tour in Atlanta, Georgia, which happened on July 30, 2011, and another in Dallas, Texas on September 17, 2011, that required two seminars, one in the afternoon and one in the evening, as they were so popular.

== Personal life ==
He married his first wife, Carol Anne Schnarr on June 23, 1979. They divorced in 1982. He married his second wife, photographer Parrish Todd, in 1983. Together, they have a son. He lives in Agoura Hills, California with his family.

Paulsen has long supported various charities and raised donations for cancer research. He has worked a lot for GOALmodels, a program for adolescents, and is a sponsor of Camp Will-A-Way, a camp for children with developmental disabilities. He also donates funds from autographs to the Wounded Warrior Project and Operation Smile. In February 2016, he was diagnosed with stage III throat cancer. He has since undergone treatment and his cancer went into remission. Following his battle with cancer, he wrote a memoir called Voice Lessons: How a Couple of Ninja Turtles, Pinky, and an Animaniac Saved My Life.

== Filmography ==
=== Film ===
- 101 Dalmatians II: Patch's London Adventure – Danny
- A Gnome Named Gnorm – Gnorm
- A Goofy Movie – P.J. Pete
- An Extremely Goofy Movie – P.J. Pete
- Aladdin and the King of Thieves – Additional voices
- Alvin and the Chipmunks Meet the Wolfman – Mr. Rochelle
- The Ant Bully – Beetle
- Balto II: Wolf Quest – Muru (singing voice), Terrier, Sumac, Wolverine #2
- Barnyard – Peck, Gopher, Pizza Twin #1
- Batman: Gotham Knight – Sal Maroni
- Batman and Harley Quinn – Harold Goldblum, Min & Max
- Batman: The Dark Knight Returns Part 2 – Rob
- Bat Thumb – No Face, Commissioner
- Beauty and the Beast: Belle's Magical World – LePlume, Right Oven Mitt
- Cathy – Irving Hillman
- Cathy's Last Resort – Irving Hillman
- Cathy's Valentine – Irving Hillman
- Cinderella II: Dreams Come True – Jaq, Grand Duke, The Baker, Sir Hugh, Bert, Flower Vendor
- Cinderella III: A Twist in Time – The Grand Duke, Jaq
- Charlotte's Web 2: Wilbur's Great Adventure – Farley, Mr. Arable
- Cranberry Christmas – Mr. Whiskers
- Curious George: A Very Monkey Christmas – Charkie, Mr. Reloj, Mr. Dulsen
- Curious George Swings Into Spring – Charkie
- Dragon Hunters – Gwizdo, Lensflair, Bat 1, Bat 2
- Elvira's Haunted Hills – Adrian
- The Fox and the Hound 2 – Chief
- The GodThumb – Mickey, Toll Booth Guard
- G.I. Joe: The Movie – Snow Job
- Green Lantern: First Flight - Weaponer
- Hamburger: The Motion Picture – Security Guard
- Happily N'Ever After – Amigo 2 (credited as Robert F. Paulsen III)
- The Haunted World of El Superbeasto – El Gato, Commandant Hess, Michael, Bobby Hyde, Grossburger, Creature Preacher
- Hoodwinked Too! Hood vs. Evil – Johann, Bad Shatner, Bad Kelley
- Holly Hobbie and Friends: Surprise Party – Gary Hobbie, Tad, Mr. Valcucci
- The Hunchback of Notre Dame – Frollo's Soldiers
- I'm Mad – Yakko Warner, Dr. Scratchansniff
- Jetsons: The Movie – Additional voices
- Jimmy Neutron: Boy Genius – Carl Wheezer, Ebenezer Wheezer, Martha Wheezer, Kid in Classroom
- Jonny's Golden Quest – Hadji
- Jonny Quest vs. The Cyber Insects – Hadji Singh / 425
- Lady and the Tramp II: Scamp's Adventure – Otis
- The Fairly OddParents: Fairy Idol – Bucky McBabbat, Government Agent 2, William Hung
- The Fairly OddParents: School's Out The Musical – Happy Peppy Gary
- The Happy Elf – Eubie, Turbo, Kid
- The Land Before Time II: The Great Valley Adventure – Spike, Strut, Chomper
- The Land Before Time III: The Time of the Great Giving – Spike, Kosh
- The Land Before Time IV: Journey Through the Mists – Spike
- The Land Before Time V: The Mysterious Island – Spike
- The Land Before Time VII: The Stone of Cold Fire – Spike, Rinkus
- The Land Before Time VIII: The Big Freeze – Spike, Stegosaurus Leader
- The Land Before Time IX: Journey to Big Water – Spike, Mo
- The Land Before Time X: The Great Longneck Migration – Spike
- The Land Before Time XI: Invasion of the Tinysauruses – Spike, Kosh
- The Land Before Time XII: The Great Day of the Flyers – Spike, Mo, Guido, Kosh
- The Land Before Time XIII: The Wisdom of Friends – Spike, Beipiaosaurus #4
- The Land Before Time XIV: Journey of the Brave – Spike, Skinny Digger
- Lego Batman: The Movie – DC Super Heroes Unite – Riddler
- Leroy & Stitch – Reuben, Squeak, additional voices
- The Little Mermaid II: Return to the Sea – Prince Eric
- The Little Mermaid: Ariel's Beginning – Ink Spot, Swifty
- Looney Tunes: Rabbits Run – Mac Gopher
- Lone Wolf McQuade – Man at festival
- Manou the Swift – Sandpipers
- Mannequin – Cop #4
- Mickey's Magical Christmas: Snowed in at the House of Mouse – Jaq
- Mickey, Donald, Goofy: The Three Musketeers – Troubadour
- Mickey's Twice Upon a Christmas – Additional voices
- Mulan II – Prince Jeeki
- Otra Película de Huevos y un Pollo – Confi
- The Perfect Match – John Wainwright
- The Pirate Fairy – Bobble
- Pixie Hollow Games – Bobble, Buck
- Pocahontas II: Journey to a New World – Additional voices
- Porco Rosso – Additional voices
- The Powerpuff Girls Movie – Hota Wata, Killa Drilla, The Doot Da Doot Da Doo Doos (uncredited), Blah-Blah Blah-Blah (uncredited), Wacko Smacko (uncredited)
- Return to Never Land – Pirates Rusty
- Rise of the Teenage Mutant Ninja Turtles: The Movie – Foot Lieutenant
- Robbie the Reindeer: Hooves of Fire - Head Elf (US dub)
- Robbie the Reindeer: Legend of the Lost Tribe - Viking 2, Viking 4 (US dub)
- Rockin' with Judy Jetson – Sky Rocker
- Scooby-Doo! and the Reluctant Werewolf – Brunch
- Scooby-Doo! in Arabian Nights – Prince
- Scooby-Doo Meets the Boo Brothers – Shreako and Dispatcher
- Scooby-Doo! Music of the Vampire – Vampire Actor #2, the Sheriff, Teen Vampire
- Secret of the Wings – Bobble
- Spaceballs – Soldier voices
- The SpongeBob Movie: Sponge Out of Water – Seagull
- Teacher's Pet – Ian Wazselewski
- Tinker Bell – Bobble
- Tinker Bell and the Lost Treasure – Bobble, Grimsley, Mr. Owl
- Tinker Bell and the Great Fairy Rescue – Bobble
- Tiny Toon Adventures: How I Spent My Vacation – Fowlmouth, Johnny Pew, Mr. Hitcher, Banjo Possum, Hotel Manager and the Bike Carrier
- Tom and Jerry: Blast Off to Mars – Computer Voice, Worker #1, Worker #2
- Tom and Jerry: The Fast and the Furry – Irving, Dave
- Tom and Jerry and the Wizard of Oz – Hickory/Tin Man
- Tom and Jerry: Back to Oz – Hickory/Tin Man
- Top Cat and the Beverly Hills Cats – James, Lester Pester, Tour Bus Driver
- Tweety's High-Flying Adventure – Sphinx, Ship Crewman, Casino Cat, additional voices
- Wakko's Wish – Yakko Warner, Pinky, Dr. Otto Scratchansniff
- Yogi and the Invasion of the Space Bears – Zor Two
- Yogi the Easter Bear – Easter Bunny, Male Ranger

=== Television ===
- ABC Weekend Special – Spike Funnybunny, Moe Weasel, Policeman
- The Addams Family – Mr. Normanmeyer, Van Swash, Additional voices
- Adventures from the Book of Virtues – Peter, Classmate
- The Adventures of Jimmy Neutron, Boy Genius – Carl Wheezer, Butch, Ebenezer and Martha Wheezer, Eustace Strych, Additional voices
- Aladdin – Omar, Additional voices
- All Hail King Julien – Brodney, Captain Ethan, Lil Arms Magee, One Eyed Simon, Brendan the Butterfly, DJ, Narrator, Snake, Recorded Voice, Additional voices
- American Dragon: Jake Long – Groom, Additional voices
- The Angry Beavers – Terrence
- Animaniacs – Yakko Warner, Pinky, Dr. Otto von Scratchansniff, Additional voices
  - Animaniacs (2020 TV series) – Yakko Warner, Pinky, Dr. Otto von Scratchansniff
- Angelica and Susie's Pre-School Daze – Plumber, Fireman, Clown
- Attack of the Killer Tomatoes – Mummato, Tomato Worm
- The Batman – Kid
- Batman: The Animated Series – Jay
- Back at the Barnyard – Peck, Bernard, Honest Earl, Skunky, Joey, Badger, Pizza Twin #1
- Ben 10 – Ditto, Monitor 2
  - Ben 10: Alien Force – Baz-El, Rhomboid Vreedle, Alien Pilot, Patrolman, Cotton Candy Vendor
  - Ben 10: Ultimate Alien – Baz-El, Rhomboid Vreedle, Magister Patelliday
  - Ben 10: Omniverse – Magister Patelliday, Rhomboid Vreedle, Ditto, Captain Kork, Chadzmuth, Tummy Head, Gorvan, Phil, Gutrot
  - Ben 10 (2016 TV series) – Clown 5, Bruce, Coach Keene
- Biker Mice from Mars – Throttle, Fred the Mutant, Additional voices
- Biker Mice from Mars (2006 TV series) – Throttle, Hairball, Additional voices
- The Blues Brothers Animated Series – Benny Fingers, Doctor
- Be Cool, Scooby-Doo! – Dave Mann, Donald, Father, Archibald
- Bonkers – Various
- The Boondocks (TV series) – The Art Teacher, Additional voices
- Brandy & Mr. Whiskers – Additional voices
- Bravoman – Bravoman, Alpha Man, Alphette, Additional voices
- Bump in the Night – Squishington
- Butt-Ugly Martians – 2-T Fru-T, Mike
- Buzz Lightyear of Star Command – AP-06, Additional voices
- Can You Teach My Alligator Manners? – Al
- Capitol Critters – Additional voices
- CatDog – Hotdog, Hamburger (Meat Dog's Friends), Additional voices
- Cathy – Irving
- Catscratch – Gordon, Additional voices
- Centerville – Mitch & Brad
- Challenge of the GoBots – Additional voices
- Channel Umptee-3 – Ogden Ostrich
- ChalkZone – Vinnie Raton, Walrus, Craniac
- Chip 'n Dale Rescue Rangers – Captain Finn, Flash The Wonder Dog, Chief Marley, Shakabaka, Darby Spree
- Chowder – VG, Dom, Additional voices
- Coconut Fred's Fruit Salad Island!— Coconut Fred, Additional voices
- Codename: Kids Next Door – Rupert Puttkin/The Great Puttinsky, Shaunie Fulbright, Robin Food, Mr. Mogle, Additional voices
- The Crow: Stairway to Heaven – James
- Curious George – Compass, Charkie, Mr. Glass, Mr. Reloj, Additional voices
- Dan Dare: Pilot of The Future – The Mekon
- Danger Rangers – Squeaky, Snarf, additional voices
- Danny Phantom – Jack Fenton, Nicolai Technus, The Box Ghost
- Darkwing Duck – Steelbeak
- Dave the Barbarian – Malsquando, Additional voices
- Denver, the Last Dinosaur – Nick, Chet, Scott, Morton's Henchmen
- Detention – Uncle Kelly
- Dexter's Laboratory – Major Glory, Puppet Pal Mitch, Additional voices
- Dino-Riders – Faze, Kameelian
- Disney's Adventures of the Gummi Bears – Gusto Gummi
- Disney's The Emperor's New School – Overachiever's Club Member
- House of Mouse – José Carioca
- Disney's Sheriff Callie's Wild West – Tricky Travis
- Doc McStuffins – Sir Kirby, Townspeople
- Duck Dodgers – Mac Gopher, Porko, Captain Peters, Axl Gator
- DuckTales (1987 TV series) – Gladstone Gander
- DuckTales (2017 TV series) – Gibbous, Restaurant Host
- El Tigre: The Adventures of Manny Rivera – Additional voices
- Elena of Avalor – Macoco
- Eloise: The Animated Series – Bill
- The Fairly OddParents – Mark Chang, Happy Peppy Gary, King Gripullon, Bucky McBadbat, Mr. Ed Ledly, Additional voices
- Fish Hooks – Magic Hamster Mirror, Additional Voices
- Fish Police – Richie
- The Flintstone Kids – Additional voices
- Foofur – Additional Voices
- Fraggle Rock: The Animated Series – Boober Fraggle, Additional voices
- Freakazoid! – Yakko Warner, George Takei, Officer Mohammed Abdul, Pinky, Francois, Lord Bravery Singers
- Fresh Beat Band of Spies – Nutty Nuts, Walnut
- Gargoyles – Helios
- Gary the Rat – Additional voices
- Generator Rex – Providence Agent Jackson, Providence Tech, Additional voices
- "The George Lucas Talk Show" – Self, episode: Streamers of the Lost Art (of Conversation)
- G.I. Joe: A Real American Hero (1985 TV series) – Snow Job, Tripwire, Flash (ARAH), World War I American Warrior, Cobra slavemaster
- Goof Troop – P.J. Pete, Additional voices
- Gravity Falls – Additional Voices
- The Greatest Adventure: Stories from the Bible – Moki
- Green Eggs and Ham – Little Snerz, Pool Shark
- Green Lantern: The Animated Series – Goggan, Bumpy
- The Grim Adventures of Billy & Mandy – Tooth Fairy, Additional voices
- Half-Shell Heroes: Blast to the Past – Donatello, Triceraton Lieutenant
- Handy Manny – Eddie
- Harvey Birdman, Attorney at Law – Baba Looey, Kids, Announcer
- Henry Hugglemonster – Denzel Dugglemonster
- Higglytown Heroes – Barber Hero
- Hi Hi Puffy AmiYumi – Atchan, Additional voices
- The High Fructose Adventures of Annoying Orange – Broccoli Alien Overlord, Marshmallow Warriors, Dr. Sigmund Fruit, Dr. Fruitenstein, Thomas Jefferson, Rock, Apricot, President Dane, Junior, Sour Grapes, Green Apple
- Histeria! – Mr. Smartypants, Sammy Melman, Additional voices
- House of Mouse – José Carioca, Panchito Pistoles (singing voice in the episode, "Not So Goofy!")
- I Am Weasel – Stevie, Admiral Algebra Doll
- It's Pony – Noodleneck Ned
- Jackie Chan Adventures – Magister #2, Punk Magister
- Jake and the Never Land Pirates – Grandpa Bones
- Jem – Prescott A. Wentworth III
- Jellystone! - Major Glory
- The Jetsons – Gus Guesser, Blinky "Boy Boy Nova" Sunspot, Hall Monitor
- The Jimmy Timmy Power Hour series – Carl Wheezer, Eustace Strych, Bucky McBadbat, Additional voices
- Johnny Bravo – Green Swoosh, Additional Voices
- Jungle Cubs – Hathi, Akela, Additional voices
- Justice League – Lightray
- K10C: Kids' Ten Commandments – Zeek, Josephat, Joshua
- Kim Possible – François, Prince Wally, Dallas, Hank Perkins, Additional voices
- Kung Fu Panda: Legends of Awesomeness – Han Sr.
- The Land Before Time – Spike/Ruby's Father/Angry Apatosaurus #1/Hidden Runner/Mo/Milo/Stegosaurus Leader/Guido/Lambeosaurus
- The Legend of Prince Valiant – Robert Draconarius, Prince Edwin, Soldier
- The Legend of Tarzan – Radio Voice
- Lego Star Wars: The Padawan Menace – Commander Cody, Bobby, George Lucas
- The Life and Times of Juniper Lee – 10th Level Warlock, Leonard the Goblin, Additional voices
- Lilo & Stitch: The Series – Reuben, Squeak, Houdini, Frenchfry, Forehead, Lax, Manny, Wishy-Washy, Additional voices
- The Little Troll Prince: A Christmas Parable – Prince Borch
- Loonatics Unleashed – Rev Runner, Mr. Leghorn, Pilot #1, Gorlop, Pizza Chef, Policeman, Construction Worker, Computer
- The Looney Tunes Show – Mac Gopher, Chuck Berost, Cashier
- The Loud House – Lane Loud, Mrs. Coconuts, Seymour, Additional voices
- Mad – Lex Luthor, Various
- The Magician – Cosmos, Sonny Boy
- The Mask: Animated Series – Stanley Ipkiss/The Mask
- Megas XLR – V'arsin
- Mickey and the Roadster Racers – José Carioca (2017–2018)
  - Mickey Mouse – Referee
  - Mickey Mouse Clubhouse – Toodles
  - Mickey Mouse Works – José Carioca
- Midnight Patrol: Adventures in the Dream Zone – Nightmare Prince
- The Mighty B! – Additional voices
- Mighty Ducks – Shecky 'The Comedian' Carter, Dr. Swindle
- Mighty Max – Mighty Max
- Mighty Magiswords – Professor Cyrus, Botticelli the Tortoise, Weather Gnome, Mr. Tundrala
- Mrs. Munger's Class – Rock and Lance
- My Friends Tigger & Pooh – Raccoon
- My Life as a Teenage Robot – Additional voices
- The New Adventures of Jonny Quest – Hadji
- New Kids on the Block – Wildcat
- The New Woody Woodpecker Show – Corky, Louie, Woody Clone, Willy Walrus
- The New Yogi Bear Show – La Bamba Bear
- Oh Yeah! Cartoons – The Goose Lady, Home Owner
- Ozzy & Drix – Travis Lum, Backseat, Chief Maximus, Additional voices
- The Penguins of Madagascar – Ad Executive #1, Technician, Archie the Raccoon, Stockbroker, Guy #1, Stockbroker #1, Scout #1, Lobster #1, Kid Kazoo
- Pepper Ann – Larry, Danny
- Phantom 2040 – Sean One, Heisenberg, Additional voices
- Phineas and Ferb – TV Scientist, Additional voices
- Pinky and the Brain – Pinky, Yakko Warner, Romy, Dr. Otto von Scratchansniff
  - Pinky, Elmyra & the Brain – Pinky
- Pig Goat Banana Cricket – Early Bird, Cousion Eel, Hands, Additional voices
- Planet Sheen – Doppy Dopweiler, Globar, Hajingy, Chock Chock, Additional voices
- The Plucky Duck Show – Mr. Bughari, Furrball, Additional voices
- Poochini's Yard – Additional Voices
- Pound Puppies – King (AKA No-Name) (uncredited)
- Pound Puppies (2010 TV series) – Pet Delivery Guy, Suds, Yakov
- The Powerpuff Girls – Brick, Boomer, Additional voices
- ProStars – Additional voices
- Puss in Boots – Basil
- A Pup Named Scooby-Doo – Professor Digby/Nasty-Doo
- Quack Pack – Nigel Nightshade
- Random! Cartoons – Solomon Fix, Danny, Tickle Monster, Handycat, Drillbit, Flavio
- Randy Cunningham: 9th Grade Ninja – Jacques
- The Real Adventures of Jonny Quest – Hadji, Additional voices
- The Replacements – Phil Mygrave, Fabian Le'Tool, Mr. Vanderbosh, Dr. Scorpius, Additional voices
- Regular Show – Additional voices
- Rick and Morty – Snuffles/Snowball
  - Rick + Morty in the Eternal Nightmare Machine – Snuffles/Snowball
- Rise of the Teenage Mutant Ninja Turtles – Foot Lieutenant and voice director
- Road Rovers – Wolf King, Katzenstoki Ambassador, Gas Station Attendant
- Robot Chicken – Jesus, Dinosaur Train Singer, The Little Match Girl's Father (Episode: "Garbage Sushi")
- Robot and Monster – Bob, Scale
- Rude Dog and the Dweebs – Rude Dog, Additional voices
- Saber Rider and the Star Sheriffs – Saber Rider, Jesse Blue
- Sabrina: The Animated Series – Uncle Zamboni
- Samurai Jack – Rothchild, Additional voices
- Savage Dragon – Octopus
- Scooby-Doo! Ghastly Goals – Julio
  - Scooby-Doo! Mystery Incorporated – Winslow Fleach, Radio Newsman
- The Secret Saturdays – Baron Finster, Car Driver, Yachstman
- Slimer and the Real Ghostbusters – Robby, Additional Voices
- The Smurfs – Marco Smurf, Additional voices
- Snorks – Corky
- Sonic the Hedgehog – Antoine Depardieu
- Space Cats – Thomas 'Tom' Spacecat, Chelsie Pipshire
- Spider-Man: The Animated Series – Morris Bench / Hydro-Man
- The Spooktacular New Adventures of Casper – Spooky the Tuff Little Ghost
- Squirrel Boy – Rodney J. Squirrel (pilot)
- Star vs. the Forces of Evil – Gustav / Charlie Booth
- Stripperella – Carl, Milton Gibbs
- SpongeBob SquarePants – Glove World officer (Episode: "Escape from Beneath Glove World"; uncredited)
- The Super Hero Squad Show – Werewolf by Night, Baron Strucker
- Super Secret Secret Squirrel – Anteater, Snooper and Blabber
- SWAT Kats: The Radical Squadron – Hard Drive, Al
- The Sylvester & Tweety Mysteries – Mechanic, Dussel, Hephaestus, Stanley Coop, Farmer Boyer
- Tak and the Power of Juju – Party Juju, Judge Juju, Gillbert
- TaleSpin (Plunder & Lightning) – Ratchet, Dr. Debolt
- Tasty Time with ZeFronk – Frankie "ZeFronk"
- Taz-Mania – Digeri Dingo, Francis X. Bushlad, Axl Gator, Timothy Platypus, Marvin the Martian
- Teacher's Pet – Ian Wazselewski
- Teenage Mutant Ninja Turtles – Raphael, Donatello
  - 1987 – Raphael, Zach the Fifth Turtle, Wingnut, HiTech, The Grybyx, Mister Ogg, Professor Sopho, Tokka, Additional voices
  - 2012 – Donatello, Speed Demon Donnie, Metalhead, 80's Raphael, Shopkeeper, Cat Owner, Other Guy, Sir Paul, Triceraton Pilot, Sumo Glen, Triceraton Commander, Additional voices
  - Rise of the Teenage Mutant Ninja Turtles – Foot Lieutenant, Teem Customer and Voice Director
- Teen Titans – The Source, Quiz Monkey Host, Stunt Show Host
- ThunderCats – Shen, Rezard
- The Tick (1994 TV series) – Arthur (Season 2 and Season 3), Brainchild (1st Time), Crusading Chameleon, Captain Mucilage, The Forehead, The Terror
- Tigger & Pooh and a Musical, Too – Raccoon
- This Just In! – Jimmy Fallon
- Time Squad – Buck Tuddrussel
- Timon & Pumbaa – Banzai, Cheetata
- Timeless Tales from Hallmark – Runabout, Duckling 3, Crocodile 2
- Tiny Toon Adventures – Arnold the Pitbull, Banjo the Woodpile Possum, Blink Winkleman, Concord Condor, Cooper DeVille, Fowlmouth, Foxy, Sneezer's Dad, Peter Hastings, Vanilla Lice, Beaky Buzzard, Furrball
- Tiny Toons: Spring Break – Beaver
- Tom & Jerry Kids – Additional voices
- Totally Spies! – Diminutive Smalls (Season 1), Asian guard
- The Transformers – Air Raid, Chase, Fastlane, Slingshot
- TripTank – John, Groom, Dad
- T.U.F.F. Puppy – Bird Brain, Additional voices
- TUGS — Ten Cents, Zak (Only in test US dub)
- Ultimate Spider-Man – Batroc the Leaper, Boomerang, Additional voices
- The Upside Down Show – Cactus
- Wake, Rattle, and Roll – D.E.C.K.S
- The Weekenders – Cousin Phillip, Carl, Sid, Murph, Nonno
- What a Cartoon! – Cop, Pigeon, Yoink, Additional voices
- What's New, Scooby-Doo? – Avery Orenthal, Government Agent, Jamison Steven Ripley, Travis Knox
- Where's Wally?: The Animated Series – Additional voices
- Wild West C.O.W.-Boys of Moo Mesa – Cacklin' Kid
- Wildfire – Additional voices
- The Wizard of Oz – Additional voices
- Yo Yogi! – Dick 'Dickie' Dastardly, Chuck Toupee, Super Snooper, Robin Hood, Waiter, Wee Willie the Gorilla, Additional voices
- VeggieTales – Mr. Finnegan J. Beet
  - VeggieTales in the House – Ichabeezer, Bacon Bill, Motato, Junior's Dad, Tom Celeriac, Additional voices

=== Video games ===
- 102 Dalmatians: Puppies to the Rescue – Fluffy
- Animaniacs Game Pack – Yakko Warner, Pinky, Dr. Otto Scratchansniff
- Animaniacs: The Great Edgar Hunt – Yakko Warner, Pinky, Dr. Otto Scratchansniff
- Animaniacs: Ten Pin Alley – Yakko Warner, Pinky, Dr. Otto Scratchansniff
- Armed and Dangerous – Captain 2, Grunt, Kato
- Armikrog – Beak-Beak, PresidANTs
- Baldur's Gate – Kivan, Volo, Prism, Telmen
- Baldur's Gate II – Shadows of Amn – Anomen Delryn, Saerk Farrahd, Biff the Understudy, Qadeel
- Barnyard – Peck
- Ben 10 Alien Force: Vilgax Attacks – Rhomboid Vreedle
- Ben 10: Omniverse – Rhomboid Vreedle
- Ben 10: Galactic Racing – Rhomboid Vreedle
- Ben 10 Ultimate Alien: Cosmic Destruction – Rhomboid Vreedle
- Biker Mice from Mars – Throttle, Hairball, Claw Tooper
- Blazing Dragons – Mervin the Magician, Inventor of Baseball
- Bubsy II – Bubsy Bobcat
- Bubsy in Fractured Furry Tales – Bubsy
- Butt-Ugly Martians: Martian Boot Camp – 2T Fru-T
- Butt-Ugly Martians: Zoom or Doom! – 2T Fru-T, Chitzok
- Catscratch – Gordon Quid
- Doom 3 – Research Director Larry Bullman
- The Fairly OddParents: Breakin' da Rules – King Gripullon, Dog Catcher, Fairy Judge, Guard, Anti-Fairies, Squirrelly Scouts, Arthur, Gilded Arches
- The Fairly OddParents: Shadow Showdown – Mark Chang, Oberon, Quince, Ape King, Chamberlain, The Shadow
- Final Fantasy X-2 – Tobli, Lian
- FusionFall – Major Glory
- Ghosthunter – Officer Lazarus Jones
- Giants: Citizen Kabuto – Timmy the Smartie
- God of War – Greek Soldier
- The Incredibles: Rise of the Underminer – The Crustodian
- Jimmy Neutron: Boy Genius – Carl Wheezer, Yokian Fleet Commander, Yokian 1, Yokian 2, Yokian 3, Retroland Worker, Ultra-Lord (PC Version only)
- Jimmy Neutron vs. Jimmy Negatron – Carl Wheezer, The Herminator, Sporko's Employee, Sparko's Owner
- Kingdom Hearts Birth by Sleep – Jaq, Grand Duke
- Lego Batman 2: DC Super Heroes – Riddler
- The Lion King: Simba's Mighty Adventure – Banzai
- Lost Odyssey – Technician Amures
- Metal Gear Solid: The Twin Snakes – Gray Fox (English dub)
- Multiversus - Brick, Boomer
- Nickelodeon Toon Twister 3D – Carl Wheezer
- Nickelodeon All-Star Brawl 2 - Raphael
- Nickelodeon Kart Racers 3: Slime Speedway – Raphael
- Nicktoons & The Dice of Destiny - Carl Wheezer, Donatello
- Orion Burger – Wilbur Wafflemeier
- PK: Out of the Shadows – PK
- Planescape: Torment – Mortimer 'Morte' Rictusgrin
- Return to Monkey Island – Bob, The Lookout
- Sacrifice – Zyzyx
- Samurai Jack: Battle Through Time – Rothchild
- Scooby-Doo 2 Monsters Unleashed: The Video Game – Black Knight, Cotten Candy Glob, Miner 49er, Doorbell
- Sea of Thieves – Bob, The Lookout, Alfredo Fettucini
- The Secret of Monkey Island: Special Edition – Bob, The Lookout, Alfredo Fettucini
- The Secret Saturdays: Beasts of the 5th Sun – Baron Finster
- Skylanders: SuperChargers – Smash Hit
- Skylanders: Imaginators – Smash Hit
- Teacher's Pet – Ian Wazselewski
- The Sopranos: Road to Respect – Gil
- SpongeBob SquarePants Featuring Nicktoons: Globs of Doom – Technus, Carl Wheezer, Traloc
- Star Wars Rogue Squadron II: Rogue Leader – Rebel Wingman 7, Slave
- Star Wars: Galactic Battlegrounds – Captain Tarpals, Gungan Villager 1
- Stonekeep – Chuckle, Snort
- Stupid Invaders – Male Robot
- Super Smash Bros. Brawl – Gray Fox
- Super Smash Bros. Ultimate – Gray Fox
- Tak: The Great Juju Challenge – Dead Juju, Head 2, Tlaloc
- Tak and the Power of Juju – Tlaloc, Head 2, Dead Juju
- Tak 2: The Staff of Dreams – Tlaloc, Dead Juju, Giant Misunderstanding Juju
- The Adventures of Jimmy Neutron: Boy Genius: Attack of the Twonkies - Carl Wheezer, Principal Willoughby, Butch Pakovski, Ebenezer Wheezer, Music Producer
- Teenage Mutant Ninja Turtles video games – Raphael, Donatello
  - Nickelodeon's Teenage Mutant Ninja Turtles – Donatello
  - Portal Power – Donatello, 80's Raphael
  - Turtles in Time – Raphael
  - Danger of the Ooze – Donatello
  - Shredder's Revenge – Raphael, Slash
  - Wrath of the Mutants - Donatello
- Toonstruck – Lugnut, Mee, Barman

=== Live-action ===
Year	Title	Role	Notes
1983	Eyes of Fire	Jewell Buchanan	
1984	Body Double	Cameraman	
1984	St. Elsewhere	Ryan S. Hope	
1985	MacGyver	Rogers	
1986	Hamburger: The Motion Picture	Security Guard	
1986	Stewardess School	Larry Falkwell	
1987	Spaceballs	Spaceball Trooper, Background Characters	Uncredited
1988	The Perfect Match	John Wainwright	
1989	Warlock	Gas Station Attendant	
1990	Rosie	Texry "Hee Haw" Rose	13 episodes
1991	Seinfeld	Greg	Episode: "The Apartment"
2004	Comic Book: The Movie	Himself	
2006–2015	Funniest Pets & People	Announcer (voice)	
2009	Big Time Rush	C.A.L. (uncredited), Parrot, Sam Selmart	
2013	I Know That Voice	Himself	
2019	Changeland	Dad	

=== Internet ===
Year	Title	Role	Notes
2012	Demo Reel	Himself	
2012	Sock Puppet Theatre	Various Voices	
2013–2014	Bravoman	Bravoman, Alpha Man, Himself, Additional Voices	
2014	Nostalgia Critic	Himself, Pinky	
2017	Nickelodeon Animation Podcast	Himself	Episode 13, 35, 41
2018	Speech Bubble	Himself	
2022–present	Loosey Goosey & Fried Chicken	Loosey Goosey	

=== Theme parks ===
Year	Title	Role	Notes
2003	Jimmy Neutron's Nicktoon Blast	Carl Wheezer	
2007	Gran Fiesta Tour Starring The Three Caballeros	José Carioca	

=== Commercials ===
Years	Title	Role	Notes
1979	Jack in the Box	Employee Spokesperson	
1993	Aliens	Hicks	
1993	Got Milk?	Radio Announcer	
1995–1997	Taco Bell	Dog	
2004–2011	American Honda Motor Company	Mr. Opportunity	
	Haribo	Narrator (Gold Bear Land)	
