= Bubsy: The Woolies Strike Back =

2017 video game

- Developer: Black Forest Games
- Publisher: UFO Interactive Games (Note: Under the Accolade label)
- Director: Jean-Marc Haessig
- Producers: Christian Kruger; Dennis Schiefer
- Designers: Rolf Beismann; Stefan Schmitz
- Artist: Stefan Schmitz
- Composers: Chris Huelsbeck; Fabian Del Priore
- Series: Bubsy
- Engine: Havok
- Platforms: PlayStation 4; Windows
- Release: 31 October 2017
- Genre: Platform
- Mode: Single-player

Bubsy: The Woolies Strike Back is a platform game developed by Black Forest Games and published by UFO Interactive Games under the Accolade label. It was released for PlayStation 4 and Windows on 31 October 2017. The game is the fifth installment in the Bubsy series, and the first new entry in 21 years since Bubsy 3D.

The game received negative reviews from critics upon release.

== Gameplay ==
Bubsy: The Woolies Strike Back returns to the 2D side-scrolling platformer gameplay found in the first Bubsy games: Bubsy in: Claws Encounters of the Furred Kind, Bubsy II and Bubsy in: Fractured Furry Tales; albeit now with 3D character models, a first for the side-scrolling entries in the series.

== Story ==
The game sees Bubsy going against the Woolies, the antagonistic race of creatures from the first Bubsy game and Bubsy 3D, who have stolen Bubsy's prized Golden Fleece. Bubsy must get through 10 levels and three boss fights to get his yarn back.

== Development ==
The game was first announced in June 2017, as a brand-new game in the Bubsy series of video games. The entry is the first one in the series in 21 years, following 1996's Bubsy 3D. The game was announced as the first of many game franchise revivals of Accolade games (which, along with Bubsy, is a brand name now operated by Hong Kong company Billionsoft), including potential revivals of HardBall!, Slave Zero, Deadlock: Planetary Conquest, Eradicator, and Redline. The game was published by Tommo's subsidiary UFO Interactive Games, and developed by Black Forest Games, who previously worked on reviving the dormant Giana Sisters series with Giana Sisters: Twisted Dreams. Like Twisted Dreams, the game was developed using the Havok physics engine. To make Bubsy: The Woolies Strike Back an improvement over previous games in the series, Black Forest Games reduced Bubsy's acceleration time, and applied better traction, thus giving the player better control of the character.

A limited edition, called the Purrfect Edition, contains a physical copy of the game, a soundtrack CD, a copy of Bubsy's official "business card", and a "Mystery Bubsy Movie Poster postcard".

The game announcement was generally not well-received by video game journalists, whose reactions ranged from indifference to irritation. Accolade seemed to expect this, taking an approach similar to Sega with promoting Sonic the Hedgehog on social media; a dedicated Twitter account for the character that makes self-deprecating and aware comments about the franchise's negative reception of some past titles was created.

== Reception ==
Reception

Aggregate score
Aggregator	Score
Metacritic	(PC) 44/100 (PS4) 45/100

Review scores
Publication	Score
Destructoid	3/10
Electronic Gaming Monthly	1/5
Game Informer	5.5/10
Hardcore Gamer	3.5/5
IGN	4.5/10
Push Square	4/10

Bubsy: The Woolies Strike Back received "generally unfavorable" reviews from critics, according to review aggregator platform Metacritic Brian Shea of Game Informer panned the game, calling it "an unnecessary resuscitation". Patrick Hancock of Destructoid questioned why the character of Bubsy was brought back and made note of its retail price of $30 and its release in the same year as other more well-received platformers. Heidi Kemps of IGN dismissed the game as "an extremely short and completely forgettable platformer based on nothing but irony and nostalgic notoriety". Christian Donlan of Eurogamer wrote "Bubsy's return is more than a little underwhelming". Conversely, Jeremy Peeples of Hardcore Gamer said it "may not be perfect, but it's easily the best Bubsy game ever made." He found the controls and voice clips in particular a dramatic improvement over previous side-scrollers in the series, though he was disappointed that Bubsy's personality was not brought out in animation and facial expressions as well as it was in the earlier games. He also praised the new pounce move and the retention of the glide move.

The game was a runner-up for the "Worst Game (That We Played)" award at Giant Bomb's Game of the Year 2017 Awards.

== Sequel ==
A sixth Bubsy title, Bubsy: Paws on Fire!, was released in 2019 for PlayStation 4, Windows and Nintendo Switch. The game was developed by Choice Provisions, which previously worked on the Bit.Trip series.
