= Bubsy: Paws on Fire! =

2019 video game

- Developer: Choice Provisions
- Publisher: UFO Interactive Games (Note: Published under the Accolade label)
- Directors: Mike Roush; Alex Neuse
- Producer: Dant Rambo
- Designer: Connor Dietrich
- Artists: Brian Berringer; Jason Cirillo; Josh DeFries
- Writer: Dant Rambo
- Composer: Stemage
- Series: Bubsy
- Platforms: PlayStation 4, Windows, Nintendo Switch
- Release: WW: May 16, 2019; (PC, PS4): WW: August 29, 2019; (Switch)
- Genre: Platform
- Mode: Single-player

Bubsy: Paws on Fire! is a platform video game developed by Choice Provisions and published by UFO Interactive Games under the Accolade brand. It was released for PlayStation 4 and Windows on May 16, 2019. The Nintendo Switch port was released on August 29, 2019. The game is the sixth entry in the Bubsy series. It was followed by Bubsy 4D in 2026.

== Gameplay ==
The game uses the 2.5D side-scrolling platforming similar to Bubsy: The Woolies Strike Back, except that the levels auto-scroll. The goal of the game is to collect enough victory tokens to access Oinker's personal zoo, the Amazootorium. Pieces of a token can be acquired throughout a level, while more tokens can be earned by replaying it as characters Virgil and the Woolie. Each playable character has his/her own moves and abilities to get through a level: Bubsy can glide and pounce, Virgil can double-jump and duck to avoid obstacles, and the Woolie can rapid fire in her ship. Each level has three checkpoints, but, unlike previous Bubsy games, the characters have infinite lives; this means, if the player bumps into an enemy or an obstacle, they will start over from the last checkpoint that they touched, but the game will never be over. If all three tokens are collected from a level, the player will have access to a 3D forward-scrolling bonus level as Arnold, who must roll throughout a tunnel while collecting fruit and crystals, and avoiding obstacles.

The game consists of three worlds with nine levels each: the Village, Research Lab, and the Amazootorium. If the player has collected enough victory tokens, they can confront a boss as Bubsy at the end of each world, including Oinker as the final boss. In two of the boss battles, Bubsy has to get in the Woolie's ship to conquer the boss; in that case, he will have the same abilities as the Woolie.

The player can also collect different items with each character: Bubsy collects yarn balls, Virgil collects atoms, the Woolie collects golden yarn balls, and Arnold collects crystals. The items can be used as currency to purchase new costumes for the characters.

== Plot ==
Bubsy and his friends are celebrating the 14th Annual Yarn Ball, when the Woolies' twin queens Poly and Ester warn him about the return of the corrupt entrepreneur Oinker P. Hamm, who is capturing animals across the universe for his own personal zoo, the Amazootorium. With the help of his sidekick Arnold, scientist Virgil Reality, Poly and Ester's finest Woolie soldier and a new pair of sneakers (a gift from Bubsy's nephew and niece Terry and Terri, called "El Gato's Zapatos"), Bubsy treks across three worlds to find Oinker and end his business.

== Development ==
Some characters were recycled from the older games as well as the cartoon pilot episode. There was a bit of debate during development and the work was scrapped and redone.

Stemage composed the soundtrack in 32-bit in a variety of genres including Electronic, Chiptune, and Rock. Most music tracks played differently depending on the character being played on a level. Each music track had its own intro, three character variants, and outro. This was to keep the music consistent with the current stage, while adding variety, avoiding repetition, and getting around system audio limitations. The music tracks were segmented so that the playback would retain smoothness during transitions and level replays.

== Release ==
The game was first set for release by March, then April but was delayed. The game's release was made possible from a Kickstarter crowdfunding campaign raising $25,000. By this time, an audio CD with the game's soundtrack was released. For the Nintendo Switch version, it was delayed to allow for adjustments. A Limited Edition for the Switch version was released, which came with a booklet and a copy of the audio CD.

== Reception ==
Reception

Aggregate score
| Aggregator | Score |
|---|---|
| Metacritic | 63% (PS4) |

Review scores
| Publication | Score |
|---|---|
| Destructoid | 5/10 (PC) |
| Nintendo Life | 5/10 (Switch) |
| Push Square | 2/10 (PS4) |
| TechRaptor | 2.5/5 (PC) |

Bubsy: Paws on Fire! received mixed reviews from critics. Destructoid regarded it as a light arcade title, highlighting its visuals and music, but criticizing the repetition and blandness. Nintendo Life described the game as the foundation of a decent runner, praising the flow and additions to the gameplay, while turning down the performance and repetition. TechRaptor gave a negative review and hoped another Bubsy game would not come in the future. Push Square gave the game a poor review expressing how frustrating it was with no redeeming quality.
