= Bubsy 4D =

2026 video game

- Developer: Fabraz
- Publisher: Atari
- Composer: Fat Bard
- Series: Bubsy
- Engine: Unity
- Platforms: Nintendo Switch; Nintendo Switch 2; PlayStation 4; PlayStation 5; Windows; Xbox One; Xbox Series X/S
- Release: May 22, 2026
- Genre: Platform
- Mode: Single-player

Bubsy 4D is a platform game developed by Fabraz and published by Atari. It is the Bubsy series' first 3D entry in nearly 30 years, following Bubsy 3D (1996), and the seventh entry in the series overall. It was released on May 22, 2026 on the Nintendo Switch, Nintendo Switch 2, PlayStation 4, PlayStation 5, Windows, Xbox One, and Xbox Series X/S platforms.

== Gameplay ==
Bubsy 4D's gameplay builds upon Bubsy 3D's (1996) core gameplay, the only other 3D game in the series. The player is still able to maneuver Bubsy through levels by jumping and gliding, but new moves have been added as well. Going into "Hairball Mode" turns Bubsy into a fast spinning orange ball with movement similar to the Super Monkey Ball series of games. The game takes place across three different planets with five levels each. An in-game shop offers new outfits in exchange for yarn the player has collected in each level, while finding hidden blueprints unlocks new upgrades and abilities, including optional tank controls similar to Bubsy 3D. Similar to previous games in the series, Bubsy provides fourth wall-breaking commentary, alluding to his own out-of-universe reputation, publisher Atari, and memes about orange cats not being very smart. A time trial mode allows players to submit their best level completion times to an online leaderboard and race against other players' ghosts.

== Plot ==
While attempting to reinvent himself, Bubsy learns from Virgil Reality that the alien Woolies have returned, but instead of stealing Bubsy's Golden Fleece as before, (Note: As depicted in Bubsy: The Woolies Strike Back (2017).) they have decided to abduct Earth's sheep population to create their own. Bubsy dismisses the kidnappings as not his concern. Later, Virgil informs Bubsy that the sheep have freed themselves and upgraded their bodies with the Woolies' technology to form their own "BaaBot" faction, stealing the Golden Fleece and taking control of the Woolies' artificial planets for themselves. Despite his reluctance, Bubsy and his friends hijack a BaaBot spacecraft and take off into space to retrieve the stolen fleece.

Bubsy travels between the planets Wooltopia, Craftus, and Metalurgia, retrieving balls of Golden Fleece along the way. On each planet, he battles one of the BaaBosses—Baarbee, Baartholomeo, and Baaptiste—who seek to eliminate all organic life from the universe. Baaptiste attempts to convert Bubsy into a cyborg like themselves, but fails and is ejected into space with Baarbee and Baartholomeo. With the Golden Fleece secured, Bubsy and his friends return to Earth.

== Development ==
In 2023, Atari SA re-acquired various assets formerly belonging to publisher Tommo, including the Bubsy franchise. Later in the year, Atari announced that they were encouraging and accepting new Bubsy game pitches from indie video game developers. Atari CEO Wade Rosen encouraged pitches to be "interesting, innovative, and tongue-in-cheek" because "the last thing anyone wants is a really generic platformer" and that Bubsy's mixed legacy presented "an interesting challenge, and someone's going to crack it." Bubsy 4D was later announced on August 19, 2025, at the Gamescom video game expo. It is scheduled for release on the Nintendo Switch, Switch 2, PlayStation 4, PlayStation 5, Xbox One, Xbox Series X/S, and Windows platforms. The game is the first 3D platformer Bubsy game in almost 30 years, following Bubsy 3D (1996), and the first to be developed by New York City-based indie developer Fabraz, developers of the well-received Demon Turf games. The characters were redesigned for 4D, with Bubsy being given an open button-up shirt and red tie designed to evoke the red exclamation mark T-shirt from his original appearance. The game features fully-voiced cutscenes, with Bubsy voiced by actor Sean Chiplock. The game's soundtrack is composed by independent duo Fat Bard, who previously composed for the Demon Turf series. The game's release was promoted with the September 2025 release of Bubsy in: The Purrfect Collection, a collection of the first four Bubsy games on modern platforms.

== Release ==
A demo of the Windows version, featuring the first three levels of the game, was released on October 10, 2025. The full game was released on May 22, 2026. A physical "Pawsome Edition" was also released for Nintendo Switch and Switch 2, which includes a manual, poster, and art book.

On August 12, 2026, a free content update was released that added 15 additional levels, new outfits, and other extras.

== Reception ==
=== Pre-release ===
A number of publications observed positive reactions to the game's reveal. Nintendo Life expressed surprise that the game's reveal "actually looks pretty good". Inverse declared that "Bubsy's got the stuff to be one of the year's must-play platformers", praising the gameplay and self-deprecating humor. Some publications noted that fans expressed surprise or frustration that Bubsy received a new game before other dormant franchises such as Banjo-Kazooie, Mega Man, Spyro the Dragon, or Crash Bandicoot.

=== Post-release ===
Reception

Aggregate scores
Aggregator	Score
Metacritic	62/100 (PS5); 67/100 (PC); 61/100 (NS2); 61/100 (XBSX)
OpenCritic	48% recommend (Note: Based on 80 reviews)

Review scores
Publication	Score
Game Informer	4/10
Giant Bomb	3/5
Hardcore Gamer	3.5/5
IGN	7/10
Nintendo Life	7/10
Nintendo World Report	9/10
Retro Gamer	70%

Bubsy 4D received "mixed or average" reviews according to review aggregator Metacritic. Reviewers praised the game's momentum-based movement and compared it favorably to the previous Bubsy games, while criticism was directed at the game's short length.

Alessandro Fillari of IGN praised Bubsy 4D as a charming and self-aware revival with satisfying, energetic platforming, but criticized the sparse levels, occasionally imprecise controls, and short campaign. Martyn Caroll of Retro Gamer found the game makes amends for the "disaster that was Bubsy 3D" and said that its true appeal lies in Bubsy's "hairball form" which actively encouraged speedrunning.

A free update that doubled the game's level count was released on August 12, 2026, addressing one of the common criticisms.
