= Bubsy in: The Purrfect Collection =

Compilation of platformer games

- Developer: Limited Run Games
- Publisher: Atari
- Director: Joe Modzeleski
- Producer: Audi Sorlie
- Programmers: Kevin Armstrong; Francesco Podda; Dimitris Giannakis; Seth Fulkerson; George Bohorquez; Randal Linden
- Artist: Veronica McCullough
- Composer: Sean Bialo
- Series: Bubsy
- Platforms: Nintendo Switch; PlayStation 5; Windows; Xbox Series X/S
- Release: September 9, 2025
- Genre: Platform
- Modes: Single-player, multiplayer

Bubsy in: The Purrfect Collection is a video game compilation developed by Limited Run Games and published by Atari. It compiles the first four entries in the Bubsy series, originally released by Accolade, Inc. between 1993 and 1996. The collection was digitally released on September 9, 2025, for Nintendo Switch, PlayStation 5, Xbox Series X/S, and Microsoft Windows, with physical releases following later. The collection received mixed reviews from critics, who praised its emulation quality and special features, but felt that none of the games were enjoyable to play.

== Contents ==
The Purrfect Collection compiles every console version of the first four Bubsy games, emulated through Limited Run Games' Carbon Engine. The games all feature quality-of-life enhancements, including the addition of cheats and the ability to create save states and rewind gameplay. A "Refurbished Edition" of Bubsy 3D is also present in the collection, which adds analog controls to the game. The appearance of each game can be changed using optional scanline filters and screen borders, while Bubsy 3D now includes native widescreen support. The game also features a music player and an in-game "Meowseum" with multiple images and videos for viewing, including behind-the-scenes materials, advertisements, interviews with development team members, original game manuals and artwork, and the 1993 Bubsy television pilot.

=== Games ===
The following games and versions are included in The Purrfect Collection.

Games in the collection
Title	SNES	Genesis	Game Boy	Jaguar	PS1
Bubsy in Claws Encounters of the Furred Kind	Yes (Note: Includes both the English and Japanese versions.)	Yes	—N/a	—N/a	—N/a
Bubsy II	Yes	Yes	Yes	—N/a	—N/a
Bubsy in Fractured Furry Tales	—N/a	—N/a	—N/a	Yes	—N/a
Bubsy 3D	—N/a	—N/a	—N/a	—N/a	Yes (Note: Includes both the original version and a new "Refurbished Edition".)

== Release ==
The Purrfect Collection was first revealed in June 2024 as one of several retro game collections announced by Limited Run Games. It is the first Bubsy game to be published by Atari since their re-acquisition of the property in 2023. It was digitally released on September 9, 2025, for Nintendo Switch, PlayStation 5, Windows, and Xbox Series X/S. Physical versions were later released, and were also available in "Deluxe" and "Im-Paw-Sible" premium editions that included additional physical merchandise.

== Reception ==
Reception

Aggregate scores
Aggregator	Score
Metacritic	57/100 (NS); 53/100 (PS5)
OpenCritic	17% recommend

Review scores
Publication	Score
Nintendo Life	4/10
Push Square	3/10
Retro Gamer	70%

The Purrfect Collection received "mixed or average" reviews according to review aggregation website Metacritic. Fellow review aggregator OpenCritic assessed that the game received weak approval, being recommended by only 17% of critics. Tom Massey of Nintendo Life praised the frontend presentation of the collection, but called the included games "frustrating and painful to play", believing the new rewind feature was crucial to finish any of the games. John Hansen of Push Square believed the new quality-of-life changes made the games "minimally better, but not good".

Nick Thorpe of Retro Gamer described the game as "tricky to score", saying even the best games in the collection are only decent and that much care was given to giving them the best presentation possible, which alone deserves recognition, concluding it was a "fantastic collection of middling to awful games."
