= Fast Break =

Fast Break may refer to:

- Fast break, an offensive strategy in basketball and handball
- Fast Break (candy), a chocolate bar by the Hershey Company
- Fast Break (film), a 1979 film starring Gabe Kaplan and Bernard King
- Fast Break (radio program), a Philippine radio program
- Fast Break (video game), a 1989 video game by Accolade
- Magic Johnson's Fast Break, a 1988 video game
