= Bubsy 3D =

1996 video game

- North American cover art
- Developer: Eidetic
- Publisher: Accolade
- Producers: Michael Berlyn; Susan Egashira
- Designers: Michael Berlyn; Susan Egashira; Marc Blank; Richard Ham
- Programmers: Christopher Reese; Marc Blank; Kathy Bayless; Norman Chang; Tom Plunket
- Artists: Craig Maitlen; Darrin Hart
- Composer: Loudmouth Inc.
- Series: Bubsy
- Platform: PlayStation
- Release: NA: November 25, 1996; EU: August 1997
- Genre: Platform
- Modes: Single-player, multiplayer

Bubsy 3D (also known as Bubsy 3D: Furbitten Planet or Bubsy Is 3D in "Furbitten Planet") is a 1996 platform video game developed by Eidetic and published by Accolade for the PlayStation. It is the first video game in the Bubsy series to feature 3D gameplay, and the fourth game in the series overall. The game was released for the PlayStation on November 25, 1996, in North America, with a later European release in August 1997. Bubsy 3D follows the series' titular character, an orange bobcat named Bubsy, who travels to the planet Rayon to stop the alien Woolies, and return safely to Earth.

After the disappointing commercial performance of Bubsy II and Bubsy in: Fractured Furry Tales, both of which were released in 1994, Accolade asked the original Bubsy creator and designer Michael Berlyn to return to the series; he decided to revitalize the series with a transition to 3D. Bubsy 3D would become one of the first platformers to fully enable 3D exploration. However, the team's unfamiliarity with 3D technology created development challenges. Late in the game's development, Berlyn saw a preview of Nintendo's Super Mario 64 at the 1996 Consumer Electronics Show, and became concerned that Bubsy 3D was an inferior game. As Accolade insisted on releasing the game on time, the team aimed to make the best game they could under the circumstances. A version for the Sega Saturn was planned but ultimately canceled.

Bubsy 3D initially had a mixed reception. Although some reviewers did praise the game upon release, it has been universally panned in retrospect. Heavy criticism has been directed at the controls, environments, and voice acting. Several publications have ranked it among the worst video games in history. The game's legacy has also been affected by unfavorable comparisons to other early 3D platformers from the same year, Super Mario 64 and Naughty Dog's Crash Bandicoot.

Bubsy 3D was the last game in the Bubsy series for nearly 21 years until Bubsy: The Woolies Strike Back. It remained the only 3D entry in the series until Bubsy 4D (2026).

The game was re-released in 2025 as part of Bubsy in: The Purrfect Collection, including an updated version with improved controls.

== Gameplay ==
Exploring three-dimensional graphics, the player takes on a role as bobcat Bubsy, scoring points by collecting atoms.

Bubsy 3D is a 3D platformer in which the player controls Bubsy, an anthropomorphic orange bobcat, in order to stop the alien Woolies and escape their planet, Rayon, by collecting atoms. The player must also collect rocket parts to build a transport back to planet Earth, and defeat the two Woolie queens, Poly and Ester. (Note: Poly and Esther debuted in Bubsy in: Claws Encounters of the Furred Kind as an orange two-headed Woolie. Here, they are purple and have their own bodies. The two-headed Woolie was retconned as the General, who appears in the game's opening and endings, and who is also fought as a boss in the game's final level.) Bubsy's actions include running, jumping, gliding, swimming, and even piloting a rocket car in certain levels. The actions can trigger the character's signature quotes. The player can also control Bubsy's running speed, and the position of the camera.

Bubsy defeats enemies by shooting atoms, as well as using his jump and glide abilities to pounce on them. Bubsy has limited lives and hit points, which can be extended by collecting atoms, reaching a high score, or by attacking clams who offer random prizes. After each level is a potential bonus round, unlocked when Bubsy collects at least 150 atoms. There are also jumping puzzles where Bubsy must activate four platforms or switches in the right order, which unlocks either a rocket or a power-up that grants temporary abilities.

The game has 18 levels. Three of them take place underwater, where Bubsy must manage his oxygen supply, and his gliding action is replaced with a jetting dive. Bubsy passes most levels by touching a goal, except for two levels that are designed as boss fights. There are two rockets in each non-boss level, and there is a different ending if Bubsy collects all of them. There is also a two-player mode, where players contest each other to collect as many points as possible and achieve a higher score.

== Plot ==
Bubsy 3D takes place on the planet Rayon, the home planet of the series' recurring enemies, the Woolies. The story follows the central character, an orange bobcat named Bubsy, whose goal is to escape the planet by building a rocket ship from a collection of atoms and rocket pieces. The story begins with the Woolie queens, Poly and Ester, invading Earth and kidnapping Bubsy, intending to steal all of Earth's yarn. However, Bubsy escapes his kidnappers when there is a malfunction on the Woolie ship, creating a panic across their planet. The Woolies fail to understand why Bubsy is collecting atoms and rocket parts, but nonetheless see him as a danger and call for a military campaign to stop him.

The game's ending depends on how many collectibles the player is able to gather. If Bubsy collects fewer than the 32 rocket parts needed to escape, his rocket will ultimately become stranded in outer space. If the player successfully collects all 32 rocket pieces, the rocket rips through the space-time continuum due to the density of the atoms that Bubsy has collected, stranding Bubsy in the Stone Age. In both cases, the Woolies go through with their plans and invade Earth.

== Development ==
Bubsy 3D was developed by Eidetic and published by Accolade. The game was designed by mainly Michael Berlyn, the original creator of Bubsy, with a team that included fellow Eidetic founder and industry veteran Marc Blank (of Zork fame). Blank also programmed the game. According to Berlyn, Accolade asked him to return to the series in hopes of revitalizing it, after the disappointing performance of the second and third installments of the series. Berlyn agreed under the condition that the game would not be a rehash of the original game, and set out to make one of the first 3D platformers.

Development of the game started in April 1995, with a team of approximately eight people. The team paid particular attention to Bubsy's body language, taking inspiration from Warner Bros. cartoons. Some magazine previews stated the game's art direction to have been overseen by Warner Bros. animator Chuck Jones, though this has been disputed by Video Game History Foundation founder Frank Cifaldi. Programmer Christopher Reese described development changes due to the team's lack of experience with 3D technology. Due to console limitations, the environments were created with flat shaded polygons instead of textured polygons, which was less typical of most console games of the time. Still, the characters were Gouraud shaded and texture mapped. Berlyn said he chose this unusual combination because it made the characters stand out, ensuring the player's attention would be on Bubsy rather than on the environments. At the time, Bubsy 3D was one of the few PlayStation games that ran in high resolution. The cutscenes between stages were animated by hand in 2D, and the 3D polygonal models were then made to mimic this animation. Sprites were used for the HUD, menu items, and power-ups. Sound effects, music and voice lines for the game were implemented with ADPCM as separate layers. The voice of Bubsy was done by actress Lani Minella.

Berlyn attended the January 1996 Consumer Electronics Show to help demonstrate the Bubsy 3D beta personally. While wandering the floor he saw the demonstration for Super Mario 64, another 3D platformer, but one built with Nintendo's best resources in order to serve as the flagship title for a new gaming console (the Nintendo 64). Berlyn realized that Bubsy 3D looked greatly inferior to Super Mario 64, but as Accolade was already committed to releasing the game, it was too late to do anything except make Bubsy 3D as good as possible within the remaining time.

In Europe, distribution was handled by British publisher Telstar Electronic Studios under their budget label "Telstar Fun & Games". Accolade planned to release a version for the Sega Saturn, and announced plans to take advantage of the more sophisticated movement of the Saturn's analog controller. However, the Saturn version was ultimately cancelled.

== Reception ==
Reception

Aggregate score
Aggregator	Score
GameRankings	51%

Review scores
Publication	Score
AllGame	1.5/5
Electronic Gaming Monthly	3/10, 4.5/10, 3/10, 2.5/10
EP Daily	4/10
Game Players	6.1/10
GameFan	80, 79, 80
GameSpot	5.5/10
Next Generation	2/5
Play	82%
Superjuegos	75/100
Absolute PlayStation	67/100
Ação Games	7/10
Gamezilla	81/100
PSExtreme	93%

Award
Publication	Award
PSExtreme	Gold X Award

Bubsy 3D received a wide range of reviews upon release, but the majority were mixed to negative. Retrospective reception of Bubsy 3D turned more vehemently negative, with several sources citing the game as one of the all-time worst.

=== Contemporaneous ===
The game holds an aggregate score of 51% at GameRankings based on five reviews. Reviewers did praise the levels' vast size, with more reviewers highlighting the game's two-player mode. However, most reviews criticized the camera for being disorienting, the environments for their blandness, and Bubsy's voice. Most of all, journalists were critical of the game's tank controls, a control style they felt was more appropriate for other games, unlike the efficient timing required for a platform game.

There were some positive reviews for Bubsy 3D. PSExtreme gave the game a 93% and an editorial "Gold X Award", comparing the game favorably to a Warner Bros. cartoon. Three reviewers in GameFan gave ratings of 80, 79, and 80 with E. Storm commenting that he found Bubsy 3D refreshing for its peculiarity, uniqueness, and addictive qualities. NowGamer credited Bubsy 3D with being the first genuinely 3D PlayStation game, and said that "younger players will be enthralled by its bright colours and simple gameplay, even if adults reach straight for the sick bucket." Martin of Absolute PlayStation felt that Bubsy's voice acting would appeal to younger players, and that the difficult game would attract challenge-seeking players. Brazilian magazine Ação Games was critical of the graphics and sound, but felt that the levels featured many fun gameplay and design elements.

On the other hand, GameSpot was critical of almost every aspect of the game, especially the voice acting: "Thank god the programmers included an option to turn off the sound bites Bubsy spews during the game; after having to endure that lispy, grating voice two or three times, the player may be tempted to kill his or her television." Crispin Boyer stated in Electronic Gaming Monthly that he could have excused the "lackluster" visuals had the game played well, and later clarified it does not. N. Somniac of GamePro found the single-player mode repetitive, slow, and predictable, and concluded that while Bubsy fans ought to rent this game to see him in 3D, action fans might prefer Crash Bandicoot. (Note: GamePro gave Bubsy 3D 3.5/5 ratings for graphics, sound, and control and a 3.0/5 for fun factor.) Describing the controls, Mike Salmon of Ultra Game Players wrote that Bubsy 3D does not give what he described that a 3D platform game should — complete control over a character. Victor Lucas of The Electric Playground criticized both the visuals and the controls, explaining that "as disappointing as the visuals of Bubsy 3D are, it is the game's lack of speed and sloppy control that really make it a pain to play." Mark Skorupa of Gamezilla gave the game an overall score of 81, but similarly felt that the controls prevented the game from reaching its potential. He explains that "platform games require precise actions and split second decisions [and] Bubsy 3D's controls are very prohibitive to this type of gameplay."

=== Retrospectives ===
Retrospective reception of Bubsy 3D was more negative than reviews made shortly after release. Less than a year after they reviewed Bubsy 3D, Electronic Gaming Monthly listed it as the seventh worst console video game of all time. In January 2002, Seanbaby ranked it 17th in his 20 worst games of all time, criticizing the game's controls, the character's personality, and the graphics. The Guardian also included it on their list of the 30 worst video games of all time. GameTrailers was another publication that named Bubsy 3D the eighth worst video game ever made, criticizing the voice clips, the tank controls, and comparing it unfavorably to Super Mario 64.

Josh Wirtanen at Retrovolve blamed Bubsy 3D's negative legacy on such comparisons to Super Mario 64, saying that Bubsy 3D reflected the quality of most 3D games at the time, compared to the exceptional quality of Super Mario 64. IGN's Levi Buchanan cited the game as a failure to transition from 2D to 3D, criticizing the character design compared to previous Bubsy games, as well as the game's controls. Game Revolution suggested that the negative reception for Bubsy 3D may be why developers are reluctant to make another 3D game in the series. In an article dedicated to the now-defunct publisher Accolade, magazine Retro Gamer listed Bubsy 3D as one of the three games to avoid and used the game as an example of the "rushed, near-unplayable misfires that damaged the company's reputation badly."

In a 2015 interview, Berlyn called Bubsy 3D "[his] biggest failure". Still, he also felt that his team had no precedent to follow and that the end product deserves praise in light of that. Following the game's release, Berlyn opted to take a couple of years off from designing video games to "rethink things". Actress Lani Minella cited her voice work on the game as one of her least favorites, describing the voice as irritating.

== Legacy ==
Bubsy 3D is remembered as one of three 3D platformers released in 1996 that established the template for the genre, along with Super Mario 64 and Crash Bandicoot. In 2013, indie developer Arcane Kids released a sarcastic tribute to the game titled Bubsy 3D: Bubsy Visits the James Turrell Retrospective. In the game, the player guides an effigy of Bubsy through a nightmarish simulation of the James Turrell exhibition at the Los Angeles County Museum of Art. A remaster of the game was released by Arcane Kids in 2017, featuring an additional epilogue to the story in which Bubsy reflects on the events of his experience. Bubsy 3D was the last new game in the series for over 20 years. In September 2017, a new team released Bubsy: The Woolies Strike Back for the PlayStation 4 and PC.

Bubsy 3D was re-released for the first time in 2025 as part of Bubsy in: The Purrfect Collection. The compilation adds native widescreen support to Bubsy 3D, and also includes a "Refurbished Edition" of the game that features analog control. A new 3D Bubsy game, Bubsy 4D, was released in 2026.
