= Mr. Opportunity =

- First appearance: 2004
- Last appearance: September 2011
- Created by: American Honda Motor Company
- Voiced by: Rob Paulsen (2004–2011); Eduardo Iduñate (Spanish)

In-universe information
- Alias: Mr. O.
- Gender: Male

Mr. Opportunity (sometimes referred to as "Mr. O.") was an animated character used in marketing by American Honda Motor Company, a subsidiary of Honda Motors. From 2004 until 2011, he appeared in Honda advertisements as their mascot during the annual Honda Clearance event. Mr. Opportunity informed viewers (or radio listeners) about the deals offered by Honda during the model year-end clearance event. His typical tagline is “I’m Mr. Opportunity, [knocks on “glass” or microphone] and I'm knockin'!” Although more recent commercials didn't always use this tagline, a neutral thumping sound was used for television instead of a screen knock reflecting the fact that LCD televisions had become more prevalent among viewers.

In 2010, for unknown reasons, Honda began a campaign referencing 'Opportunity is knocking', but the commercials aired without Mr. Opportunity appearing. Several weeks into the campaign, Mr. Opportunity began making on-screen appearances; however his traditional trademark antics were modified that year.

Mr. Opportunity's TV commercials were animated by LAIKA/house in Portland, Oregon and the animation was directed by Aaron Sorenson entirely in the classic 2D animation style.

In September 2011, following the earthquake and tsunami in Japan, which affected Honda's supply chain a lot, the campaign ended and was replaced by the "Good Reasons" campaign, featuring actor Patrick Warburton making jabs at a cardboard Mr. Opportunity in the introductory ad about a "man doing a cartoon man's job".

== Character design and look ==
Mr. Opportunity appeared as a white man in his thirties. He has dark-blonde hair slightly up at the front in a kind of "cowlick" fashion and has green eyes. He typically wears a light-blue dress shirt with the sleeves rolled up, light brown slacks, and dark brown shoes. In older commercials, he wore a gray sport coat over that outfit. In the 2010 commercial "Paparazzi," Mr. Opportunity wore a dark blue suit and white collared shirt.

=== Voice portrayal ===
From 2004 to 2011, he was voiced by Rob Paulsen in the American commercials. In the Spanish dub of the commercials, he was voiced by Eduardo Iduñate.

== Radio ==
In radio commercials, Mr. Opportunity is sometimes joined by another person who usually expresses a certain amount of excitement upon meeting him. An example of this is as follows:

Sally: Wow, you’re so much taller in person…
Mr. O.: Sally, I’m not really real, I’m animated —
Sally: Aw, not to me, you’re not. Oh, are you married?

In these radio ads, Mr. Opportunity frequently references the fact that he is animated (i.e., not real, unlike the people around him). In one radio ad, he admits that coffee "goes right through [him]" when Sally asks him if he wants to get a cup with her (this obviously pokes fun at Mr. Opportunity's "intangibility").

== See also ==
- Honda
- Rob Paulsen
