= Bubsy in Fractured Furry Tales =

1994 platform video game

Bubsy in: Fractured Furry Tales
- Developer: Imagitec Design
- Publisher: Atari Corporation
- Producer: Faran Thomason
- Designers: Jody Cobb; Mark Hooley
- Programmer: Andrew Seed
- Artists: Colin Jackson; David Severn; Rick Lodge; Steve Noake
- Composers: Alastair Lindsay; Kevin Saville
- Series: Bubsy
- Platform: Atari Jaguar
- Release: NA: December 1994; EU: January 1995
- Genre: Platform
- Modes: Single-player, multiplayer

Bubsy in: Fractured Furry Tales is a platform video game developed by Imagitec Design and published by Atari Corporation for the Atari Jaguar in North America in December 1994, and Europe in January 1995. The third entry in the Bubsy series, the plot follows the titular character, who ventures through a realm of fairy tales to restore order and protect children all over the world from creatures and antagonists of corrupted fairy tales, which appeared after Mother Goose was captured by Hansel and Gretel.

In 1993, Accolade signed an agreement with Atari to become a third-party developer for the Jaguar, licensing Bubsy in: Claws Encounters of the Furred Kind from their catalog to be ported and released on the platform. During development, it was decided to create an original title due to Claws Encounters of the Furred Kind being already old on the market, introducing new enemies and storyline while making it more difficult than previous entries to cater towards younger and older players, using the original source code ported from Sega Genesis as basis. Fractured Furry Tales was produced by Faran Thomason, who worked on Jaguar titles such as Cybermorph (1993).

Fractured Furry Tales garnered a mixed reception from critics and retrospective commentators; some reviewers were divided regarding the overall audiovisual presentation, which they felt did not make use of the Jaguar's hardware and compared it to previous iterations on Sega Genesis and Super Nintendo Entertainment System, while criticism was geared towards its gameplay, controls, level design, and high difficulty. By 1995, the game had sold fewer than 9,000 copies. It was followed by Bubsy 3D (1996).

== Gameplay ==
Bubsy is about to turn the signal light post from green to red during the game's first level.

Bubsy in: Fractured Furry Tales is a side-scrolling platform game similar to Bubsy in: Claws Encounters of the Furred Kind and Bubsy II in which the player assumes the role of Bubsy, an anthropomorphic orange bobcat and the game's protagonist. The plot follows Bubsy venturing through Fairytaleland to restore order and protect children all over the world from creatures and antagonists of corrupted fairy tales that appeared after Mother Goose, who maintained peace and balance of the stories on Fairytaleland, was captured by Hansel and Gretel. The player controls Bubsy across 15 levels divided into five chapters, each themed after a different fairy tale: Alice's Adventures in Wonderland, Jack and the Beanstalk, Ali Baba and the Forty Thieves, Twenty Thousand Leagues Under the Seas, and Hansel and Gretel.

The player must maneuver Bubsy through the levels by jumping and gliding, while also collecting "Bubsy Balls" scattered across the levels, which grant points and an extra life when enough balls are collected. Players start off with nine lives at the beginning of the game, which are lost if Bubsy comes into contact with an enemy or an enemy attack, falls into either a spiked pit, a body of water, or from heights without gliding, gets crushed, or running out of time. Bubsy can only take one hit before losing a life. Enemies and bosses in the game are themed after their respective levels, representing one of the five fairy tales and they do not respawn on the level when defeated, even after the player loses a life. More lives can be earned by collecting numbered t-shirts but the game is over once all lives are lost, though the player can keep playing from the last level they died by finding a continue item.

Other gameplay elements include crates containing beneficial or harmful objects, invincibility t-shirts that render Bubsy immune to enemy contact and attacks but not from environmental hazards, and checkpoints that let players restart at the last location reached after dying. Signal light posts are placed at fixed positions on each level, acting as switches to deactivate spiked doors that block a section of the level if they are colored red. The door opens when the post is colored green the doors open, allowing players to progress further in the level. Also returning from both the first and second entries are doors which warps Bubsy into another section of the level or a hidden room. While it has a password feature that allows the player to resume their last progress, the game's internal EEPROM only saves high scores and changes to the option settings. In addition, the game also has a two-player option which allows two players to play by alternating turns.

== Development ==
Bubsy in: Fractured Furry Tales was created by Imagitec Design, a Dewsbury-based game developer founded in 1986, which had previously developed The Humans (1992) and a conversion of Raiden (1990) for the Atari Jaguar. It was produced by Faran Thomason of Atari Corporation, who worked on Jaguar titles such as Cybermorph (1993). The coding work was chiefly handled by programmer Andrew Seed, with Karl West, Martin Randall, Nigel Conroy, and Trevor Raynsford providing additional support. The game was designed by Jody Cobb, who also acted as level designer alongside Mark Hooley, with Seed as well as David Severn and Steve Noake providing additional design. Severn and Noake, along with Colin Jackson and Rick Lodge, were also responsible for the artwork. Game artist Shaun McClure also collaborated in the development process at Imagitec, drawing some of the game's enemies but went uncredited. The soundtrack was composed by Alastair Lindsay and Kevin Saville.

In 1993, Accolade signed an agreement with Atari to become a third-party developer for the Jaguar, licensing five titles from their catalog in order to be ported and released on the platform: Barkley Shut Up and Jam!, Brett Hull Hockey, Bubsy in: Claws Encounters of the Furred Kind, HardBall III, and Jack Nicklaus' Power Challenge Golf. The original idea was to port Claws Encounters of the Furred Kind to Jaguar, with gaming magazines advertising it as such. According to Thomason, however, it was decided to make an original title during development due to the first game being already old on the market, introducing new enemies and storyline while using the original source code ported from Sega Genesis supplied by Accolade as basis. The game was also made more difficult than previous Bubsy entries to cater towards younger and older players, with Thomason explaining that this was due to playtesters who were used to the extreme difficulty of video games at the time. Thomason also claimed the game's marketing and production budget was "fairly limited".

== Release ==
The game was first showcased at the 1994 Summer Consumer Electronics Show. Its final title, Bubsy in: Fractured Furry Tales, was later unveiled and featured in a promotional recording sent by Atari to video game retail stores on November 14, being advertised with a December launch window. It was first released by Atari in North America in December. The game was later released in Europe in January 1995. In Spain and Japan, it was distributed by Products Final and retailer Messe Sanoh respectively. Fractured Furry Tales was the only game out of the five titles from the Atari-Accolade deal to be released for Jaguar. In 2025, the game was re-released for the first time as part of Bubsy in: The Purrfect Collection for Nintendo Switch, PlayStation 5, Windows, and Xbox Series X and Series S.

== Reception ==
Reception

Review scores
| Publication | Score |
|---|---|
| Consoles + | 60% |
| Electronic Gaming Monthly | 7/10, 6/10, 5/10, 7/10, 7/10 |
| Game Players | 45% |
| M! Games | 57% |
| Mega Fun | 57% |
| Next Generation | 2/5 |
| Player One | 75% |
| Video Games (DE) | 65% |
| Atari Explorer Online | 3/5 |
| Atari Gaming Headquarters | 4/10 |
| Electronic Games | C− |
| Flux | C |
| Games World | 71/100 |
| Jaguar | 65% |
| Play Time | 57% |
| ST-Computer | 50% |
| ST Magazine | 72/100 |
| VideoGames | 4/10 |

Bubsy in: Fractured Furry Tales garnered a mixed reception from critics. Internal documentation from Atari Corporation showed that the game had sold fewer than 9,000 copies by April 1, 1995, though the book Inside Electronic Game Design by author Arnie Katz tells that 50,000 out of only 60,000 copies produced were sold in the first six months of release.

GamePro's Manny LaMancha commented that the game "offers a muddled mix of good and bad ingredients", citing its colorful graphics but jerky animation, good music but raspy sound effects, inconsistent control responsiveness, and fickle collision detection. Mega Fun's Martin Weidner noted its level design and extensive worlds but concurred with LaMachna, finding Bubsy's controls sloppy and the collision detection imprecise, as well as the game's high difficulty frustrating. Player One's Sami Souibgui commended the visuals and humor but criticized its playability, particularly Bubsy's controls. Souibgui ultimately regarded it as a nice platform game but felt it didn't exploit the Jaguar's capabilities.

Writing for the German magazine Jaguar, Daniel Jaeckel gave it positive remarks for the graphics but echoed similar thoughts as LaMancha and Weidner regarding the controls and difficulty, in addition to finding each chapter frustrating due to their non-linear level design and numerous enemies. Consoles + lauded its visuals and varied action, but they felt that the gameplay was not up to par. Electronic Gaming Monthly's five reviewers felt the control could have been tweaked. Nevertheless, they highlighted its large levels, as well as the detailed graphics and sound. In contrast, Game Players wrote: "To call this game frustrating is to give frustrating games a bad name. It just goes to show you that some endangered species deserve to be extinct."

MAN!AC's Robert Bannert saw the game's world visually unimaginative, expressing that it did not showcase the Jaguar's hardware. Next Generation said it has colorful and visually pleasing graphics but generic gameplay. Play Time's Stephan Girlich regarded it as an "average fare", noting that its high level of difficulty quickly diminished interest. ST-Computer's Rainer Fröhlich did not concurred with the other critics regarding the game's visuals, commending its appealing fairy tale world, colorful backgrounds, and Bubsy's detailed animation. However, the editor found its poor audio quality and difficulty to be negative aspects.

Marc Abramson of the French ST Magazine found Fractured Furry Tales fast and fluid but neither difficult nor easy. Abramson also commended the colorful cartoon-like setting, though he felt that it didn't pushed the Jaguar's hardware. VideoGames' Jim Loftus disagreed and lambasted the game's overall graphical presentation, writing that it did not show signs of being a 64-bit title. Loftus also found the gameplay frustrating, while also criticizing it for a lack of original play mechanics and quality audio. Flux's Jeff Kitts wrote that "the Jag's huge color palette and graphic capabilities gives Bubsy an impressively rich look. However, the action is way, way slow and at times so jerky you'll feel like your Jag is on the fritz." Atari Gaming Headquarters' Keita Iida was equally critical of the game, citing a frustrating combination of sloppy controls and high difficulty, suggesting Jaguar owners Rayman (1995) instead.

=== Retrospective coverage ===
Retrospective commentary for Bubsy in: Fractured Furry Tales has been equally middling. Author Andy Slaven regarded it as one of the better platform games on the Jaguar, citing its controls and colorful graphics, though noting that it looked and played exactly like the Super NES and Sega Genesis iterations. In a retrospective review, The Atari Times' Christopher J. Bean criticized the animation and control, though he complimented the visuals and music. In a retrospective outlook of the Bubsy series, IGN's Levi Buchanan wrote that while the fairy tale theme worked, he felt the game overall was "one giant step sideways", citing its very forced attitude, as well as the lack of extras and improvements from Bubsy II.

Michael Tausendpfund of German website neXGam faulted its demanding difficulty and long levels. Although Tausendpfund gave positive remarks for its adequate gameplay and fluid graphics, he felt that the game was technically feasible on SNES. Hardcore Gaming 101's Kurt Kalata found its concept interesting and the visuals impressive by SNES standards. While also commending the Amiga-style music, Kalata nevertheless wrote that "you can expect the same crappiness as it's [sic] predecessor." Eurogamer's John Linneman regarded Fractured Furry Tales as a "strange mishmash" of Bubsy in Claws Encounters of the Furred Kind and Bubsy II, criticizing its enemy and platform placement. Linneman also felt the game failed in utilizing the Jaguar's hardware, noting the simplified parallax background scrolling compared to previous entries, and stated that its visuals did not offer advantage over 16-bit consoles of the era.
