= Bubsy =

Series of platforming video games

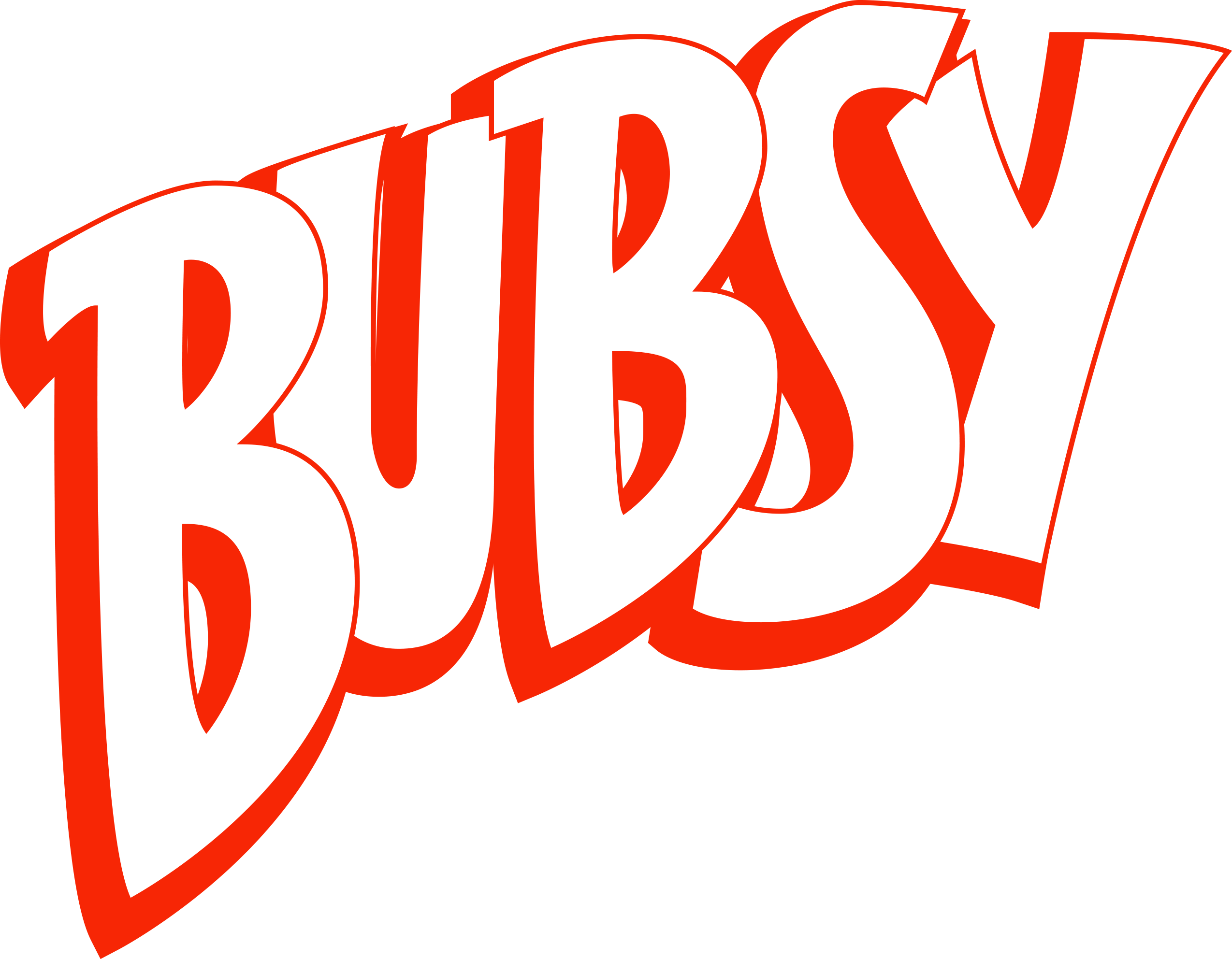
- Logo used in 1993 and since 2025
- Developers: Accolade, Imagitec Design, Eidetic, Black Forest Games, Choice Provisions, Fabraz
- Publishers: Accolade, Atari Corporation, Messe Sansao, Inc., Retroism, Billionsoft, Tommo, UFO Interactive Games, Atari, Inc.
- Creator: Michael Berlyn
- Composers: Matt Berardo; Chip Harris; Alastair Lindsay; Kevin Saville; Chris Huelsbeck; Fabian Del Priore; Stemage; Fat Bard
- Platforms: Super NES, Mega Drive/Genesis, Game Boy, Atari Jaguar, PlayStation, PlayStation 4, Nintendo Switch, Xbox One, PlayStation 5, Xbox Series X/S, Nintendo Switch 2, Microsoft Windows
- First release: Bubsy in Claws Encounters of the Furred Kind; May 1993
- Latest release: Bubsy 4D; May 22, 2026

Bubsy is a series of platform video games created by Michael Berlyn and developed and published by Accolade. The games star an anthropomorphic bobcat named Bubsy, a character that takes inspiration from Super Mario Bros. and Sonic the Hedgehog.

The first entry in the series was released in 1993, with multiple sequels released afterwards, but poor reception to Bubsy 3D (1996) caused the series to be put on hold. Beginning in 1999, ownership of Accolade and the Bubsy franchise changed hands several times, with later owners including Infogrames (now Atari SA), Tommo, and Billionsoft, the latter of which released two Bubsy games in the late 2010s. As of April 2023, Atari SA has re-acquired the Bubsy franchise and is currently publishing new games in the series through Atari, Inc. In addition to the games, a television pilot was created for a potential Bubsy animated series, but it was not picked up by any channel.

== Characters and story ==
A promotional Christmas card released by Atari in 2025 highlights the variations in the character's design and personality: from left to right: 4D, 3D, Claws Encounters of the Furred Kind and The Woolies Strike Back.

The protagonist of the series is Bubsy, an orange bobcat who typically wears a white shirt with a red exclamation mark on it; for Bubsy 4D, he was given an open button-up shirt and red exclamation mark tie designed to evoke his original appearance. He is described as loud-mouthed and wise-cracking, and frequently employs a personal catchphrase, "What could possibly go wrong?" Certain games have acknowledged Bubsy's perceived obnoxiousness with an in-game option to alter the frequency of his voice lines. Bubsy has the ability to jump and glide for short distances, with later games allowing him to pounce at enemies and roll himself into a "hairball".

Bubsy's supporting cast include Terri and Terry, his overeager twin niece and nephew; Arnold, his cowardly armadillo sidekick; Virgil Reality, a vole inventor and mad scientist; and Oblivia, Virgil's assistant and Bubsy's potential love interest who is hard of hearing. These supporting characters first appeared in the Bubsy television pilot and were not designed by Bubsy creator Michael Berlyn, who was on hiatus from Accolade at the time. Following the cartoon pilot, these characters were later introduced into the video games. Certain games, including Bubsy II and Paws on Fire!, have featured playable appearances for these characters.

In the series, Bubsy is the owner of the world's largest yarn collection, including the rare Golden Fleece. This makes him a frequent target of the Woolies, a race of wool-loving aliens from the planet Rayon, led by queens Poly and Ester. Multiple games have featured Bubsy and the Woolies battling for control of Earth's yarn and the Golden Fleece as a central plot element. Bubsy has also repeatedly contended with Oinker P. Hamm, a capitalist pig who steals rare objects and creatures to turn them into attractions. The television pilot includes an original villain, Ally Cassandra, an aristocratic alley cat constantly seeking to expand her wealth and power; she is aided by her henchmen Bozwell the buzzard and Sid the shrew, who appear as enemies in Bubsy II.

== History ==
Release timeline
1993	Bubsy in Claws Encounters of the Furred Kind
1994	Bubsy II
1994	Bubsy in Fractured Furry Tales
1995
1996	Bubsy 3D
1997–2016
2017	Bubsy: The Woolies Strike Back
2018
2019	Bubsy: Paws on Fire!
2020–2025
2026	Bubsy 4D

=== Bubsy in: Claws Encounters of the Furred Kind ===
The first Bubsy game was released by Accolade in May 1993 for the Super NES, and in July for the Sega Genesis. The plot focuses on Bubsy retrieving the world's yarn supply from the invading Woolies. A Windows port, titled Super Bubsy, was later released in May 1997.

=== Bubsy II ===
Bubsy II was released in October 1994, again for SNES and Genesis. In the game, Bubsy infiltrates Oinker's "Amazatorium", a theme park that saps information away from history and puts it on display for his personal profit. A Game Boy version was released the following year, and featured Super Game Boy support, while a Game Gear version was cancelled.

=== Bubsy in Fractured Furry Tales ===
Bubsy in: Fractured Furry Tales was released in December 1994, for the Atari Jaguar. This game sees Bubsy traversing across Fairytaleland to rescue the kidnapped Mother Goose.

=== Bubsy 3D ===
Bubsy 3D is the fourth Bubsy game, and was the series' first 3D entry. In the game, Bubsy is kidnapped by the Woolies and taken to their home planet, and must construct a rocket ship to escape. The game was released in 1996 for the PlayStation, while a planned release for the Sega Saturn was cancelled.

=== Bubsy: The Woolies Strike Back ===
In October 2017, Billionsoft released a fifth Bubsy title and the series' first new entry in over 20 years, Bubsy: The Woolies Strike Back, developed by Black Forest Games for PlayStation 4 and Windows. The game once again features Bubsy pursuing the Woolies, now attempting to retrieve his prized Golden Fleece.

=== Bubsy: Paws on Fire! ===
A sixth Bubsy title, Bubsy: Paws on Fire!, was developed by Choice Provisions and released in May 2019, for PlayStation 4 and Windows. Unlike other entries, Paws on Fire! is an auto-running game, in which Bubsy and his allies must free trapped animals from the Amazootorium, Oinker's personal zoo. A Nintendo Switch version was released the following August.

=== Bubsy 4D ===
A seventh Bubsy game, titled Bubsy 4D, was developed by indie studio Fabraz and published by Atari in May 2026 for Nintendo Switch, Nintendo Switch 2, PlayStation 4, PlayStation 5, Xbox One, Xbox Series X/S, and Windows. The game is a 3D platformer, and features Bubsy retrieving the golden fleece from an army of BaaBot sheep robots.

=== Compilations ===
An emulated re-release of the first two SNES games, titled Bubsy Two-Fur, was released on Steam in December 2015 by Tommo division Retroism. Two-Fur was later delisted in September 2025.

In June 2024, Atari announced Bubsy in: The Purrfect Collection, a compilation of the first four games in the series developed by Limited Run Games. The Purrfect Collection was released digitally in September 2025 for Nintendo Switch, PlayStation 5, Xbox Series X/S, and Windows, with physical releases set to follow at a later date.

== Other media ==
=== Television pilot ===
A pilot episode for a potential Bubsy animated series was produced by Calico Entertainment and Imagination Factory, and sponsored by Taco Bell. Titled "What Could Possibly Go Wrong?", it aired on Bohbot Communications' Kid's Day Off syndication package for Thanksgiving 1993. In the episode, Bubsy must rescue Virgil and Oblivia from Ally Cassandra, who wants Virgil's new reality-altering helmet for herself. Rob Paulsen provides the voice of Bubsy, while the other characters were performed by Tress MacNeille, Jim Cummings, Pat Fraley, B. J. Ward and Neil Ross. The pilot was not picked up for a full series, but was included in Super Bubsy and The Purrfect Collection.

=== Other appearances ===
In 2013, independent game developer Arcane Kids released Bubsy 3D: Bubsy Visits the James Turrell Retrospective, an unofficial fan game satirizing Bubsy 3D in celebration of the franchise's 20th anniversary. The parody game was well-received by audiences, and was briefly considered for inclusion in The Purrfect Collection.

Bubsy is planned to appear in RollerCoaster Tycoon Wonderworks as a costumed entertainer.

== Reception ==
Bubsy was awarded "Most Hype for a Character" of 1993 by Electronic Gaming Monthly. Bubsy also won GameFan's "Best New Character" award for 1993.
