= Fast Break (video game) =

1988 video game

- Developer: Accolade
- Publisher: Accolade
- Platforms: Amiga, Apple IIGS, Commodore 64, MS-DOS, Classic Mac OS
- Release: 1988
- Genre: Sports
- Modes: Single-player, multiplayer

Fast Break is a 1988 sports video game developed published by Accolade for MS-DOS. It was ported to the Amiga, Apple IIGS, Commodore 64, and Mac.

== Gameplay ==
Fast Break simulates the 3 on 3 game of basketball, allowing one or two players to control the players with either the keyboard or a joystick. The game allows to customize player's team by choosing any of the pre-defined players with their unique strength and weaknesses.
