= Bubsy in Claws Encounters of the Furred Kind =

1993 video game

Bubsy in: Claws Encounters of the Furred Kind
- Sega Genesis cover art
- Developers: Accolade; Solid Software; Al Baker & Associates (Genesis); ATI Technologies (Windows)
- Publishers: WW: Accolade; JP: Pack-In-Video (SFC); EU: Nintendo (SNES)
- Producers: John A.S. Skeel; Cynthia Kirkpatrick; Sandy Jackson (Windows)
- Designer: Michael Berlyn
- Programmers: D. Scott Williamson; Joel Seider (SNES); Al Baker (Genesis); Bart Crane (Windows)
- Artists: Beckett Gladney; Ken Macklin; Ken Nicholson (Windows); Mark Johnson (Windows)
- Composer: Matt Berardo
- Series: Bubsy
- Platforms: Super Nintendo Entertainment System; Genesis; Windows
- Release: Super NES; NA: May 1993; EU: October 28, 1993; BR: December 1993; JP: June 17, 1994 Genesis; NA: July 1993; EU: August 1993 Windows; NA: May 19, 1997; JP: August 29, 1997
- Genre: Platform
- Mode: Single-player

Bubsy in: Claws Encounters of the Furred Kind, often shortened to Bubsy, is a 1993 platform game developed and published by Accolade for the Super Nintendo Entertainment System. A port to the Sega Genesis was released months later. It is the first entry in the Bubsy series of video games. The game's title is a play on words in reference to the film Close Encounters of the Third Kind, with the game revolving around Bubsy defending the planet's supply of yarn balls from alien invaders.

The game was ported to Windows in 1997 under the title Super Bubsy. A sequel, Bubsy II, was released in 1994.

== Gameplay ==
Screenshot of the first level

In the game, enemy aliens called "Woolies" intend to steal Earth's supply of yarn balls. Since Bubsy has the world's largest collection of yarn balls, he has the most at stake and sets out to stop the Woolies and reclaim the yarn balls. The game plays as a 2D side-scrolling platformer. The player must maneuver Bubsy through the levels, jumping on Woolies, and collecting stray yarn balls (which earns the player an extra life if 500 are collected). The game consists of sixteen levels, and Bubsy starts off with nine lives.

== Development ==
Designer Michael Berlyn had previously designed adventure video games, prior to his work on Bubsy. Eventually burning out on the genre, he came across the Sonic the Hedgehog and ended up playing it 14 hours a day, for a whole week, in order to find inspiration to do his own take on it. Development of the game began on December 6, 1991. Earlier sketches show Bubsy wearing shoes which were omitted in the final design. The Genesis version, which was the first one being worked on, was to be released in September 1992, but Accolade's legal troubles with Sega caused the game to be delayed. After artists Beckett Gladney and Ken Macklin constructed the backgrounds and character animations respectively on a PC program, a group named Solid Software went on to program them for the Super NES.

Director John Skeel said in an interview that they wanted to create a game "as fast as Sonic and as deep as Mario" that would be easy to play but hard to master. He also had difficulty finding a good voice for the main character. After weeks of searching through voice talent tapes, Skeel received a call from Brian Silva who aided trying to find a suitable voice, until Skeel tried speeding up a recording of Silva's voice, which took inspiration from Looney Tunes characters like Daffy Duck and Bugs Bunny, and added to the end result of Bubsy's design. Bubsy's catchphrase, "What could possibly go wrong?", was derived from the development team's quip.

In December 1992, some children who resided near Accolade's office in San Jose, California, were invited to have pizza, soda, and to playtest the game. The children were also asked to comment on the game's aspects. Their suggestion to add more secret paths was picked up, resulting in the inclusion of some underground tube ways in the first level.

A group of 20+ people worked on the game. During the programming of the Super NES version of the game, one of the hazards in the game was catnip that could drive Bubsy mad. This was replaced with banana peels because of Nintendo's censorship policies. The game was developed and released concurrently for the Super NES and Genesis, with each version looking and sounding almost identical.

== Release and promotion ==
Pre-release anticipation for the game was very high, with the game receiving aggressive marketing regarding the game as the next Sonic the Hedgehog or Super Mario. Bubsy himself even won Electronic Gaming Monthly's "Most Hype for a Character of 1993". GameFan awarded Bubsy "Best New Character" for 1993. In January 1993 at the Consumer Electronics Show (CES) in Las Vegas, a Bubsy mascot leaped out of a sack to greet spectators. Months after the game's release, a lottery was put up by Accolade and GamePro. Winners of the lottery would win a 6-day trip to tourist locations in California, receive $500 in cash, and meet the game's developers. Other prizes included a Bubsy plush and shirt. In Spain, a contest of drawing Bubsy fanart was put up where the winners would receive a cap, a hairpin, a shirt, a cup, and a rain coat.

The Super NES version was released in Japan under the title Yamaneko Bubsy no Daibōken. (Note: やまねこバブジーの大冒険, Yamaneko Babujī no Daibōuken; lit. Bubsy the Bobcat's Great Adventure) The release was mostly identical, except that Bubsy's voice clips and most of the in-game text were dubbed in Japanese. Super Bubsy, a port of the game to Windows 95 developed by ATI Technologies, was released on May 19, 1997. It contained completely redrawn graphics and the Bubsy cartoon pilot, unlocked for viewing by collecting all 20 hidden TVs in the game.

The Super NES version was also re-released on Steam via emulation on December 17, 2015, as part of Bubsy Two-Fur, a compilation which also includes the Super NES version of Bubsy II. The Super NES and Genesis versions, as well as Yamaneko Bubsy no Daibōken, were re-released as part of Bubsy in: The Purrfect Collection in 2025. The Super NES version was also re-released on the Nintendo Classics service on October 9, 2025.

== Reception ==
Reception

Review scores
Publication	Score	
Publication	Sega Genesis	SNES
Computer and Video Games	81/100	N/A
Electronic Gaming Monthly	N/A	7/10, 9/10, 8/10, 8/10
Famitsu	N/A	7/10, 6/10; 5/10, 4/10
Game Informer	N/A	8.75/10, 8.5/10, 9/10
GameFan	80%, 84%, 82%, 88%	87%, 80%, 81%, 84%
GamesMaster	N/A	71%
Mean Machines Sega	80%	N/A
Official Nintendo Magazine	N/A	79/100
Super Play	N/A	77%
Total!	N/A	(UK) 81%, (DE) 2
VideoGames & Computer Entertainment	N/A	8/10
Hippon Super!	N/A	7/10
Mega	78%	N/A
Mega Action	87%	N/A
Mega Drive Advanced Gaming	74%	N/A
Mega Power	8/10	N/A
MegaTech	74/100	N/A
MegaZone	93/100	N/A
Sega Force Mega	84/100	N/A
Sega Power	69%	N/A
Sega Pro	81%	N/A
Sega Zone	77/100	N/A
SNES Force	N/A	70/100
Super Action	N/A	70%
Super Control	N/A	61%
Super Gamer	N/A	89%
Super Pro	N/A	93/100

Bubsy in Claws Encounters of the Furred Kind on the Super NES received generally favorable reviews. GamePro's Feline Groovy praised its graphics and opined that Bubsy had more personality than Sonic thanks to his animations and voice clips. She considered the game's non-linear levels to be a strong point and the controls to be a weak point, elaborating that Bubsy tends to keep running even without pressing the controller. VideoGames & Computer Entertainment's Andy Eddy commended the non-linear level designs, but complained that Bubsy suffers from uncontrollable momentum and that the game's backgrounds did not move enough to give the player a frame of reference when taking leaps. Electronic Games listed it as one of the best Super NES games.

The game also won a Parents' Choice Award for being fun but non-violent.

=== Genesis ===
The Sega Genesis version also garnered generally favorable reception from critics. GamePro's The Unknown Gamer found the Genesis version to be graphically identical despite being limited by a weaker color palette, but noted that Bubsy's moves were easier to execute than those of his SNES counterpart. Electronic Games listed it as one of the best action games for the Genesis.

=== Windows ===
Unlike the Super NES and Sega Genesis versions, the Microsoft Windows version, Super Bubsy, received generally unfavorable reviews.

=== Retrospective coverage ===
In a retrospective outlook, IGN highlighted the classic cartoon-inspired character designs, but called Bubsy in Claws Encounters of the Furred Kind a "mediocre" game and a "pale Sonic imitator", criticizing its floaty, imprecise physics and odd level design. Hardcore Gaming 101, also in retrospect, deemed the game as a "Sonic rip-off", faulting its physics, collision detection, and overall level design lacking structure and cohesion.
