= Accolade, Inc. =

American video game company

Infogrames North America, Inc.

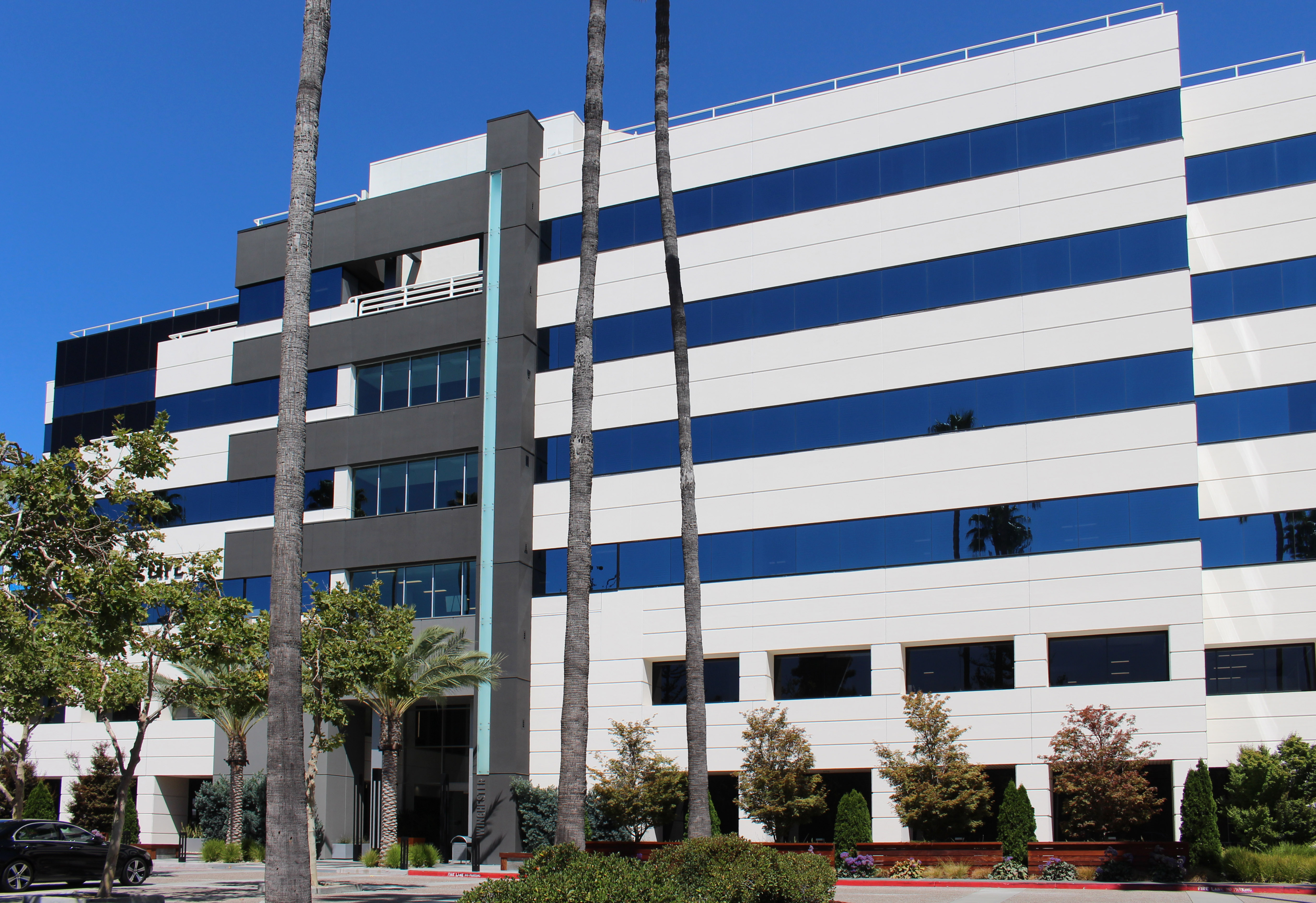
- Former headquarters in San Jose, c. 2023
- Formerly: Accolade, Inc. (1984–1999)
- Type: Subsidiary
- Industry: Video games
- Founded: 1984; 42 years ago
- Founders: Alan Miller; Bob Whitehead
- Defunct: October 3, 2000; 25 years ago
- Fate: Acquired and consolidated
- Headquarters: San Jose, California, US
- Area served: North America
- Products: HardBall! series; Test Drive series; Jack Nicklaus series; Star Control series; Bubsy series
- Parent: Infogrames (1999–2000)
- Website: accolade.com (archived)

Accolade, Inc. (later Infogrames North America, Inc.) was an American video game developer and publisher based in San Jose, California. The company was founded as Accolade in 1984 by Alan Miller and Bob Whitehead, who had previously co-founded Activision in 1979. The company became known for numerous sports game series, including HardBall!, Jack Nicklaus and Test Drive.

By the early 1990s, Accolade saw critical acclaim for Star Control (1990), as well as strong sales for Bubsy (1993). However, Sega sued Accolade for creating unauthorized Sega Genesis games by reverse-engineering the console's boot-protection. Accolade won the case on appeal, overturning an injunction from the lower court that had interrupted their sales and development. The founders soon left the company. The new chief executive, Peter Harris, attracted new investment from Time Warner. The following year, Accolade president Jim Barrett replaced him. He focused on existing franchises hoping to secure the company's future. However, technical issues undermined the release of Bubsy 3D (1996), and Jack Nicklaus 5 (1997) was considered a commercial disappointment, despite positive reviews. The company still had modest successes with games such as Star Control 3 (1996) and Deadlock (1996), and saw strong sales for both Test Drive 4 (1997) and Test Drive: Off Road (1997).

The French firm Infogrames purchased Accolade in 1999 as part of its strategy to become more global, transforming it into a subsidiary called Infogrames North America. By 2000, it was consolidated into Infogrames, Inc. (the former GT Interactive), marking the end of Infogrames North America as a separate company and what remained of Accolade as an entity. In the years that followed, Infogrames purchased the Atari trademark and rebranded as Atari SA, before declaring bankruptcy in 2013 resulting in the sell-off of some assets. The Accolade assets were purchased by game publisher Tommo, who later resold them to Hong Kong–based holding company Billionsoft as part of a strategy to revive several classic games, however the assets that Billionsoft held were re-acquired by Atari SA in April 2023.

== History ==
=== Origins (1984–1985) ===
First logo of Accolade, used from 1984 to 1990

Alan Miller and Bob Whitehead founded Accolade in 1984; both had worked previously at Atari. They believed Atari undervalued its programmers, leading them to leave the company and start Activision in October 1979. Activision became the first developer to operate independently of the console companies and one of the few firms to survive the video game crash of 1983, though they still posted a US$18 million loss the following year. After a large devaluation of their stock, Miller and Whitehead left Activision to form Accolade.

Accolade was founded and operated in San Jose, California. Whitehead and Miller focused their game development on home computers such as the Commodore 64, exploring a market for which Activision had not yet created games. This allowed Accolade to take advantage of the new technology of floppy disks, which were less expensive to manufacture than cartridges and did not require licensing fees to be paid to the console companies. Whitehead and Miller were unable to attract investment so soon after the game market had crashed, leading them to self-fund their new venture. The pair hired chief executive officer Tom Frisina to handle managerial duties, and they each began to work on their own launch titles. They also hired Mimi Doggett, a veteran visual artist from Atari, to compete with other developers on graphical detail.

When you've achieved so much success on a specific game system, it's hard to let go of it. We saw a new market, a new challenge, and some better hardware ... we wanted to move forward.

— Alan Miller, Accolade co-founder

Their goal for their first titles was to think beyond the gaming medium and draw inspiration from other forms of popular entertainment, including television and film. Miller's first project was Law of the West (1985), a High Noon–inspired western that mixed gunfights with adventure game elements, pioneering a choice of dialogue options that later became common in games. At the same time, Whitehead had seen success previously with the sports games Home Run and Football (1979) on the Atari 2600, which led to the baseball game HardBall! (1985) as his Accolade debut. The game was the first to emulate the "behind the pitcher" viewpoint seen on television, and introduced new features such as player data and coach mode. It became one of Accolade's bestselling games on the Commodore 64 and was considered one of the biggest commercial successes of its time.

=== Success in sports and publishing (1985–1990) ===
Accolade aimed to balance its roles as a developer and publisher. Miller recalled, "we tried to have about half of the original titles done by employee developers and half by external development groups". Several outside groups would port the games to other hardware so that Accolade could focus their staff on creating original titles. One of their first third-party games was SunDog: Frozen Legacy (1985) by FTL Games. Accolade recruited Mike Lorenzen from Activision to create the science fiction game Psi 5 Trading Company (1985), drawing inspiration from Star Trek. Other early successes included the boxing game Fight Night (1985), developed by Canadian developer Artech Digital Entertainment. Artech also created the combat flight simulation game The Dam Busters (1984), inspired by the eponymous classic war film. This led them to create another combat flight simulator called Ace of Aces (1986) with a development cost of US$80,000, which sold 500,000 units and became one of Accolade's most successful games. Accolade partnered with other publishing companies such as U.S. Gold to distribute their games in Europe, before later switching to Electronic Arts (EA).

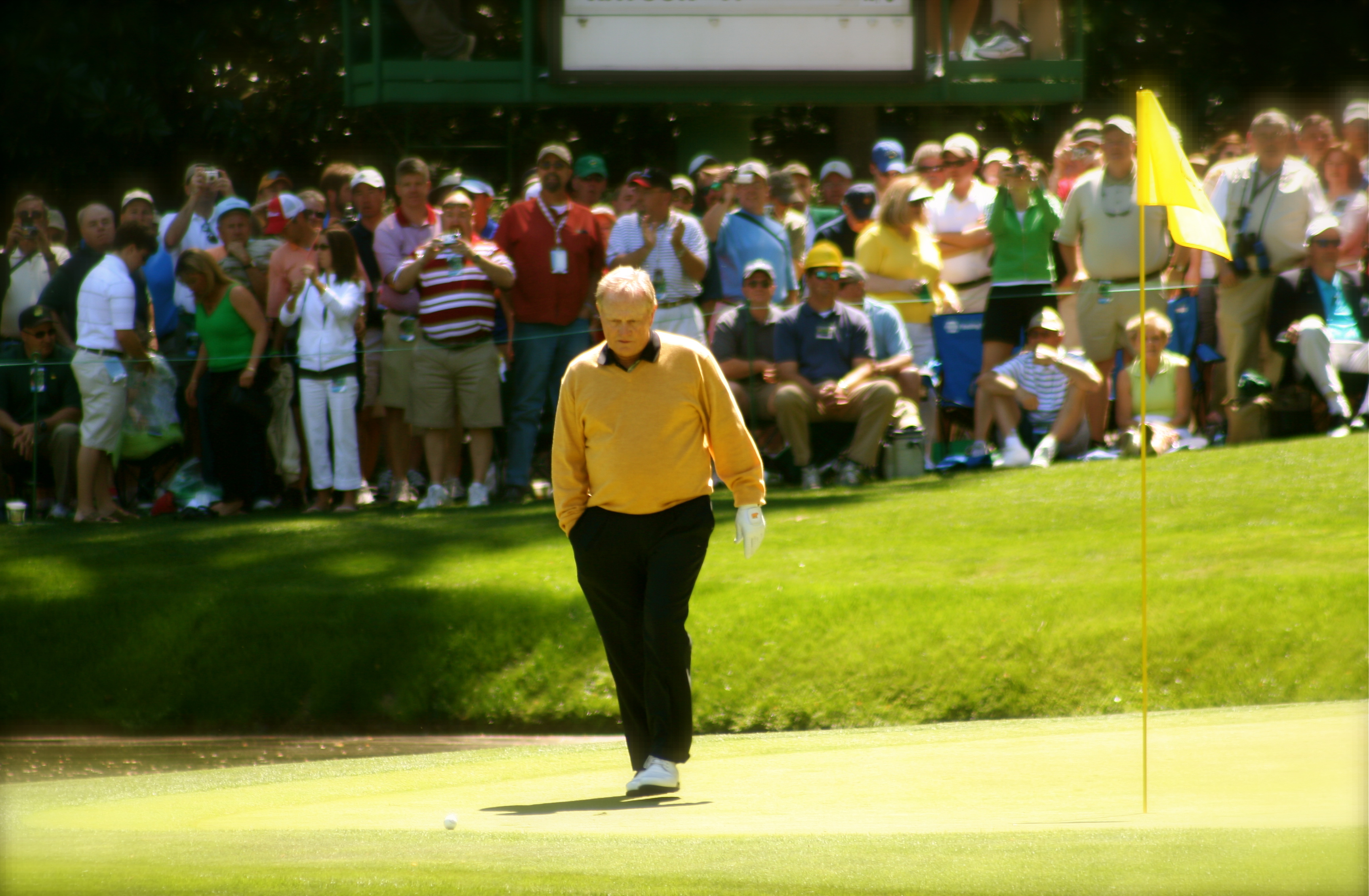
Accolade credits the Jack Nicklaus license with giving them an edge against their competitors.

Between 1985 and 1986, Accolade's revenues grew from US$1.5 million to US$5 million, thanks to titles like Ace of Aces, a golf game called Mean 18 (1986), and a driving game called Test Drive (1987). Distinctive Software, another Canadian developer who had previously ported Accolade's games to other computer systems, created Test Drive. The game pioneered the concept of driving exotic cars at the risk of being chased by the police and led to a series that would become one of Accolade's most successful. In 1987, Frisina left as CEO to found his own game company, Three-Sixty Pacific. Miller briefly took over as CEO until Allan Epstein was hired to lead the company in May 1988.

Accolade continued to enjoy a strong reputation as a publisher and developer of sports games. Their baseball game Hardball! became one of their most popular series, with later entries created by outside developers such as Chris Taylor. This allowed Whitehead time to develop original titles like the American football game 4th & Inches (1987), while the company published Steve Cartwright's basketball game Fast Break (1989), and Artech's tennis game, Serve & Volley (1988). Many of these sports titles became commercially and critically successful, with Accolade's biggest successes coming from golf. Their first golf game Mean 18, developed by Rex Bradford, became the Jack Nicklaus series. These games pioneered the "three-click" system seen in most golf games, where the player times their button presses to control their backswing, downswing and follow-through. Accolade outsold other golf game publishers thanks to the Jack Nicklaus license. By 1990, Accolade released Test Drive III: The Passion (1990), developing the game in-house as the first game in the series with three-dimensional (3D) polygon graphics.

At the turn of the decade, Accolade tried to diversify outside sports games and into other game genres. Hoping to compete with leading adventure game publishers LucasArts and Sierra, Accolade created their own adventure game engine. Infocom alumni Mike Berlyn created the adventure game Altered Destiny (1990), while Cartwright, an Activision veteran, created the Les Manley series. Accolade also published the Star Control series of games, created by Paul Reiche III and Fred Ford. Released in 1990 and 1992 respectively, both games received awards, and journalists repeatedly ranked them among the best games of all time. Still, Accolade remained focused on their successful sports games, and accidentally placed a sticker on the box of Star Control II calling it the "Best Sports Game" of 1992.

=== Console and legal challenges (1990–1993) ===
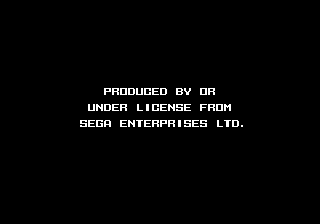
A screenshot of Sega's Trademark Security System. Accolade reverse engineered the security measure, leading to a landmark legal dispute.

By the early 1990s, Accolade observed the rise of a new generation of gaming consoles, and sought to shift towards a market they had previously abandoned. In 1990, Accolade CEO Allan Epstein expressed his opinion that the growing console market was both an opportunity and a challenge, since both the technology and audience differed from that of the computer.

The company released several games for the Sega Genesis by reverse engineering the console's boot-protection. Sega sued Accolade for doing this without their authorization, winning an initial injunction that forced Accolade to stop selling any games for the Genesis. Accolade, however, won on appeal, setting a precedent that became cited in numerous cases about reverse engineering. Accolade later reached an out-of-court settlement with Sega that allowed Accolade to continue building their own Genesis cartridges as an official licensee. One condition of the settlement was that Accolade would develop several games exclusive to Sega consoles, as a way for Sega to maintain an advantage over their rivals.

As Accolade rushed to develop the games promised to Sega, the company saw the departure of co-founder Bob Whitehead, who felt their games were slipping in quality and that the game industry had become tiresome. CEO Allan Epstein also left the company, and Alan Miller once again became the chief executive. By 1993, they had published the commercially successful platform game Bubsy (1993), created by Berlyn. Accolade marketed the game to compete with the most recognizable console mascots of the time, namely Nintendo's Mario and Sega's Sonic the Hedgehog, and Accolade's sales benefited from publishing Bubsy for both consoles. Accolade also tried to replicate its advantageous golf license in other sports, including their association football game Pelé! (1993) and American football game Mike Ditka Power Football (1991).

The lawsuit with Sega continued to have serious long-term effects for Accolade. Despite succeeding at the Court of Appeals and negotiating an agreement with Sega, the lower court's injunction had interrupted Accolade's sales and development for several months in 1992. Alan Miller estimated that "the commercial damage associated with this injunction ultimately proved to be somewhere around US$15 to US$25 million", leading the company to report major losses in 1993.

=== New leadership (1994–1999) ===
Accolade hired a new CEO in 1994, recruiting the former head of FAO Schwarz, Peter Harris, to help them attract much-needed investment. Alan Miller initially stayed on as chairman and head of product development, but quit the company later in the year to work in medical software, marking the end of the founders' influence. Harris led the company's efforts to build a new management team and secure new financing from Time Warner, before leaving to become CEO of the San Francisco 49ers in 1995.

Accolade president Jim Barnett became the new CEO and largely focused their strategy on extending existing franchises. Sales improved under his management. The company expanded the Bubsy series with multiple titles released on several consoles, including Sega, Nintendo, Atari Jaguar, and eventually PlayStation. However, the second and third installments of the Bubsy series were commercial disappointments, leading Accolade to ask series creator Mike Berlyn to return as the next game's producer. Berlyn worked on Bubsy 3D (1996) with a new team, but 3D technology was challenging for the developers. When they requested more time to polish the game, Accolade insisted on keeping the scheduled release date. After its release, the game's technical issues hurt the reputation of the Bubsy series, as well as that of Accolade as a company.

Accolade asked Ford and Reiche to make a third Star Control game at the same budget as Star Control II, which they turned down to pursue other projects. Instead, the publisher licensed Reiche and Ford's copyrighted character designs to make Star Control 3 (1996) with a different development team. However, the third game in the series did not live up to Accolade's hopes for the franchise, with reviewers noting the series' change in developer, tone and quality. Still, Star Control 3 was considered a moderate commercial success for Accolade as a publisher, as was the release of Deadlock (1996), both released in 1996. Accolade saw Deadlock as the start of a potential comeback. Moreover, Test Drive 4 (1997) and Test Drive: Off Road (1997) sold well for both the PC and PlayStation platforms, with sales of more than 850,000 and 500,000 copies respectively, making it the top-selling racing series at the time. Jack Nicklaus 5 (1997) was also a critical success, but was a commercial disappointment.

Despite Barnett's efforts, Accolade was unable to replicate the success of their earlier releases. With the company in need of a broad commercial success, EA invested in Accolade in 1997 and took over their distribution. The success of Test Drive: Off Road led the company to focus more heavily on consoles, which meant abandoning a massively multiplayer online game project. Accolade previewed several of their 1998 titles at the Electronic Entertainment Expo, with entries in major series such as HardBall 6 (1998), Test Drive 5 (1998), Test Drive: Off Road 2 (1998), and Star Control 4, as well as two original titles: Redline (1999) and Big Air Snowboarding (1999). By the end of the year, Accolade released their sequels to Test Drive as scheduled, while canceling their plans for a fourth Star Control game. Pitbull Syndicate completed the development of Big Air, which was released at the start of 1999 after a delay. Development was also completed on Redline, and Accolade published the driving-and-shooting game in April 1999.

=== Acquisition and end (1999–2000) ===
French publisher Infogrames purchased Accolade in April 1999, as part of the European company's strategy to gain a distribution network in North America. Infogrames paid US$50 million to acquire Accolade's workforce of 145 employees, their sports franchises such as Test Drive and Hardball, and Accolade's licensing deals with brands such as Major League Baseball. They retained CEO Jim Barnett to lead a new subsidiary company that became Infogrames North America, combining Accolade's workforce with an Infogrames office of 29 employees. As a result, major franchises such as Test Drive 6 (1999) and Test Drive: Off-Road 3 (1999) were published under the "Infogrames North America" name starting in 1999. What followed was a series of acquisitions and consolidations, when Infogrames purchased GT Interactive and renamed it Infogrames, Inc. Infogrames later merged Infogrames North America into a subsidiary of Infogrames, Inc. The merger was completed on October 3, 2000.

Later, Infogrames acquired the Atari brand from Hasbro Interactive in 2001, and through the decade slowly re-branded their properties under Atari SA. Atari/Infogrames declared bankruptcy in 2013, and game publisher Tommo purchased the "Accolade" trademark and several related assets. In June 2017, Hong Kong–based holding company Billionsoft announced its acquisition of the "Accolade" trademark, and together with developer Black Forest Games and publisher Tommo, announced it would develop new entries for several Accolade franchises, starting with the Bubsy series. In April 2023, it was announced that Atari had re-acquired over 100 different titles from Billionsoft, including select Accolade titles as well as the company's trademark and brand. Using this trademark, Atari announced Accolade Sports Collection, a compilation of Accolade sports titles developed by QUByte Interactive, in January 2025.

== Games ==
Accolade's video game series included HardBall!, Test Drive, Jack Nicklaus, Star Control and Bubsy.
