= Bubsy II =

1994 video game

- Sega Genesis cover art
- Developer: Accolade
- Publisher: Accolade
- Designer: Cyndi Kirkpatrick
- Programmers: Paul Kwinn; Russell Shiffer
- Composer: Chip Harris
- Series: Bubsy
- Platforms: Sega Genesis, Super NES, Game Boy, PC
- Release: Sega Genesis: NA: October 15, 1994; EU: October 28, 1994; Super NES: NA: October 15, 1994; EU: 1994; Game Boy: NA: August 1995; EU: 1994
- Genre: Platform
- Modes: Single-player, multiplayer

Bubsy II is a platform video game, the sequel to Bubsy in Claws Encounters of the Furred Kind, and the second game in the Bubsy series. It was originally released by Accolade in 1994 for the Sega Genesis, Super NES, and Game Boy. The Super NES version was re-released for Windows as part of Bubsy Two-Fur on December 17, 2015, while all three versions were re-released as part of Bubsy in: The Purrfect Collection in 2025.

== Gameplay ==
Gameplay of Bubsy II on Sega Genesis. Bubsy shoots his Nerf Ballzooka at an enemy.

Bubsy II plays very similar to its predecessor, as a 2D sidescrolling platformer. Unlike the first game where playing through the stages is linear, in Bubsy II the player gets to choose stages. The player must still maneuver Bubsy through the level through jumping and gliding, though Bubsy now collects marbles instead of yarn balls. The game features more variety than its predecessor. One new feature in the game was the ability to shoot a Nerf Ballzooka gun. A multiplayer mode was added as well, where a second player could control one of Bubsy's younger relatives. Bubsy can now take three hits before losing a life.

== Story ==
Corrupt entrepreneur Oinker P. Hamm announces a new theme park, the Amazatorium, which features virtual worlds based on various historical eras. Unknown to the public, Oinker is stealing items and information from throughout history using a time machine, changing the past so his thefts can only be found in his park. Fearing that the Amazatorium might get too crowded on its opening day, Bubsy's niece Terri and nephew Terry decide to break into the theme park the night before. Bubsy and his sidekick Arnold follow them into the park to rescue them and foil Oinker's plans.

== Development ==
Planning for the game started as early as a few months prior to the release of the first Bubsy game, with team members coming up with three possible scenarios for the game, none of them involving the first game's antagonists "The Woolies". A pilot for an animated television adaptation titled "What Could Possibly Go Wrong?" aired on Thanksgiving Day. Some characters from the TV pilot appeared in the second game. The sequel moved into full production after the first game was released and was a commercial success. The "history alteration" plotline of the game resembles one mentioned in-character by Bubsy as a prospective sequel in a press release for the first game, which would have featured villains named Hairnet and the Dogbot. However, a different, new development team within Accolade was responsible for making the game, without original designer Michael Berlyn's assistance. Like the original, the Sega Genesis and Super NES versions are virtually identical, but the Game Boy version is drastically different, with different level designs and only black-and-white graphics, unless played on a Super Game Boy, which applied very basic coloring.

Original Bubsy creator Michael Berlyn, who was not involved in this game of the series, has strongly criticized the game, stating that it "just about killed the franchise" and that "Accolade's choices about doing Bubsy II in-house with the development team selected was a mistake that pretty much buried him...Bubsy II failed due to mismanagement of the character. It was done by people who, no matter how talented and interested they may have been, had not understood the original vision".

== Promotion ==
A lottery was put up where the grand prize winner would have a 3-day trip to Hollywood as well as a tour of the studio where the Bubsy TV special was created. First prize winners were awarded shirts, while second prize winners were awarded patches.

== Reception ==
Reception

Review scores
Publication	Score	
Publication	Sega Genesis	SNES
Computer and Video Games	80/100	79/100
Game Players	64%	N/A
GameFan	50/100, 56/100, 60/100	N/A
Hyper	61/100	N/A
Mean Machines Sega	84/100	N/A
Official Nintendo Magazine	N/A	82/100
Total!	N/A	3
Electronic Games	A	A−
Games World	83/100	N/A
Mega	86%	N/A
Sega Power	72%	N/A
Sega Pro	88%	N/A
Super Gamer	N/A	70/100
VideoGames	N/A	6/10

Bubsy II on the Sega Genesis received generally favorable reviews. GamePro's CC Rider voiced approval for the multiple paths through each stage, special items, minigames, and improved controls over the first game. However, they felt that the game is boringly easy for experienced players. Electronic Games' Laurie Yates also praised the game for its audiovisual department and gameplay.

=== Super NES ===
The Super NES version garnered an average reception from critics. Electronic Games' John Wesley Hardin praised the game's humor and non-linear gameplay. GamePro's The Unknown Gamer stated that while the new features are initially confusing and some of the level designs are not as charming or original as the first game, Bubsy's personality remained as the game's main draw.

=== Game Boy ===
The Game Boy version was met with mixed reviews. Hardin highlighted its gameplay and graphics, which he considered exceptional for a Game Boy title. Electronic Gaming Monthly's five editors commented that the Game Boy port was a good introduction for those who had never played Bubsy before. GamePro's Earth Angel heavily criticized the Game Boy version, stating that it suffered from sloppy controls, boring enemies, slow-paced gameplay, poor graphics by Game Boy standards. They also said that none of the character's personality was retained in this version.

=== Retrospective coverage ===
In a retrospective outlook, IGN conceded that the gameplay had generally been cleaned up, but still felt the game lacked originality, stating that "the game just never quite gelled. Coming in only a year after the original Bubsy meant corner-cutting, which manifested itself in the art direction and enemy design. Too many assets are reused and some of the stages, such as the music levels, are just uninspired". Hardcore Gaming 101, also in retrospect, said that "Bubsy II is definitely an improvement, but the designers simply cranked the dial up from 'pile of junk' to 'terribly mediocre'".
