= Index of DOS games (T) =

This is an index of DOS games.

This list has been split into multiple pages. Please use the Table of Contents to browse it.

Title	Released	Developer(s)	Publisher(s)
T2: The Arcade Game	1991	Probe Software	Acclaim Entertainment
Tag Team Wrestling	1985	Quicksilver Software	Data East, U.S. Gold
Tales of the Unknown, Volume I: The Bard's Tale	1987	Electronic Arts	Interplay Entertainment
Tangled Tales	1989	Origin Systems	Origin Systems
Tapper	1984	Marvin Glass and Associates	Bally Midway
Task Force 1942	1992	MicroProse	MicroProse
Tass Times in Tonetown	1986	Brainwave Creations, Interplay Productions	Activision
Tau Ceti	1987	CRL Group PLC	CRL Group PLC
Tau Ceti II: Academy	1988	CRL Group PLC	CRL Group PLC
Team Suzuki	1991	Gremlin Graphics	Gremlin Graphics
Team Yankee	1990	Oxford Digital Enterprises	Empire Interactive
Tears	1997	Hypnomagic	BBS Interactive Multimedia
Techno Cop	1988	Gray Matter, Imagexcel	U.S. Gold
Teen Agent	1995	Metropolis Software House	Metropolis Software House
Teenage Mutant Ninja Turtles	1989	Distinctive Software	Ultra Software Corporation
Teenage Mutant Ninja Turtles II: The Arcade Game	1992	Image Works	Konami
Teenage Mutant Ninja Turtles: Manhattan Missions	1991	Distinctive Software	Konami
Tegel's Mercenaries	1992	Mindcraft	Mindcraft
Telengard	1985	Avalon Hill	Avalon Hill
Tempest 2000	1994	Atari Corporation, Llamasoft	Atari Corporation
Temple of Apshai	1982	Epyx	Automated Simulations
Temple of Apshai Trilogy	1985	Epyx	Epyx, Keypunch Software
Temple of Kroz	1990	Scott Miller	Apogee Software
Tennis Cup	1990	Loriciel	Loriciel
Tennis Cup 2	1992	Loriciel	Loriciel
Terminal Terror	1994	Pie in the Sky Software	Expert Software
Terminal Velocity	1995	Terminal Reality	3D Realms
Terminator 2029	1992	Bethesda Softworks	Bethesda Softworks
Terminator 2029: Operation Scour	1993	Bethesda Softworks	Bethesda Softworks
Terminator 2: Judgment Day	1991	Dementia	Ocean Software
Terminator 2: Judgment Day - Chess Wars	1993	Capstone Software	IntraCorp
Terminator, The	1991	Bethesda Softworks	Bethesda Softworks
Terminator: Rampage	1993	Bethesda Softworks	Bethesda Softworks
Terminator: Future Shock	1995	Bethesda Softworks	Bethesda Softworks
Terra Nova: Strike Force Centauri	1996	Looking Glass Technologies	Looking Glass Technologies
TerraFire	1997	ORT Software	ORT Software
Terror in Christmas Town	1995	Michael Zerbo	Michael Zerbo
Tesserae	1993	Eurocom Entertainment Software	GameTek
Test Drive	1987	Distinctive Software	Accolade
Test Drive II	1989	Distinctive Software	Accolade
Test Drive III: The Passion	1990	Accolade	Accolade
Test Drive: Off-Road	1997	Motivetime Ltd.	Accolade
Tetris	1986	AcademySoft	AcademySoft
Tetris	1988	Nexa	Spectrum Holobyte
Tetris Classic	1992	Spectrum Holobyte	Spectrum Holobyte
Tetris Gold	1993	Sphere, Inc.	Spectrum Holobyte
TFX	1993	Digital Image Design	Ocean Software
Theatre of War	1992	Artech	Three-Sixty Pacific
Their Finest Hour: The Battle of Britain	1989	LucasFilm Games	LucasFilm Games
Theme Hospital	1997	Bullfrog Productions	Electronic Arts
Theme Park	1994	Bullfrog Productions	Electronic Arts
Theme Park Mystery	1990	Joined Up Writing Software	Image Works
Thexder	1987	Game Arts	Sierra Entertainment
Think Quick!	1987	The Learning Company	The Learning Company
Third Courier, The	1989	Manley & Associates, Synergistic Software	Accolade, Inc.
Thomas the Tank Engine & Friends Pinball	1995	Spidersoft	Alternative Software
Thomas the Tank Engine & Friends	1993	Software Creations (UK)	THQ
Thor Trilogy, The	1989	Scenario Software	Apogee Software
Three Sisters' Story	1996	Sakura Soft	JAST USA
The $100,000 Pyramid	1987	The Box Office, Inc	The Box Office, Inc
The 11th Hour	1995	Trilobyte	Virgin Interactive
The 7th Guest	1993	Trilobyte	Virgin Games
The Three Stooges	1987	Incredible Technologies	Cinemaware
ThunderBlade	1989	Sega	U.S. Gold
Thunderchopper	1989	Sublogic	Sublogic
Thunderstrike	1990	Millennium Interactive	Millennium Interactive
Thunderstrike 2	1995	Core Design	Core Design
Tie Break	1990	Starbyte Software	Starbyte Software
Tiles of the Dragon	1993	Softdisk	Softdisk
Time and Magik	1988	Level 9	Mandarin Software
Time Bandit	1988	MicroDeal	MichTron Corp.
Time Commando	1996	Adeline Software	Electronic Arts, Activision
Time Gate: Knight's Chase	1996	Infogrames	Infogrames, Interplay Entertainment
Time Paradox	1996	Flair Software	Flair Software
Timequest	1991	Legend Entertainment	Legend Entertainment
Time Riders in American History	1992	The Learning Company	The Learning Company
Times of Lore	1988	Origin Systems	Origin Systems
Tintin in Tibet	1996	Infogrames	Infogrames
Tintin on the Moon	1989	Probe Entertainment	Infogrames
Tip Off	1992	Anco Software	Anco Software
Titan	1988	Titus Software	Titus Software
Titus the Fox	1992	Titus Interactive	Titus Interactive
T-Mek	1996	Bits Studios	GT Interactive
Tomahawk	1987	Digital Integration Ltd.	Datasoft
Tomb Raider	1996	Core Design	Eidos Interactive
Tomb Raider Gold	1998	Core Design	Eidos Interactive
Tom & Jerry	1993	Albino Frog Software	Hi-Tech Expressions
Tom & Jerry Cat-astrophe	1990	Hi-Tech Expressions	Hi-Tech Expressions
Tongue of the Fatman	1989	Brian A. Rice, Inc.	Activision
Tony La Russa Baseball 3	1995	Stormfront Studios	Maxis
Tony La Russa's Ultimate Baseball	1991	Stormfront Studios	Strategic Simulations
Toobin'	1989	Tengen	Domark
Toonstruck	1996	Burst Studios	Virgin Interactive
Top Gun	1987	Ocean Software	Thunder Mountain (company)
Top Gun: Danger Zone	1991	Distinctive Software	Konami
Top Gun: Fire At Will	1996	Spectrum Holobyte	MicroProse
Toppler	1990	Locis	Locis
Torin's Passage	1995	Sierra On-Line	Sierra On-Line
Tornado	1993	Digital Integration Ltd.	Spectrum Holobyte
Total Eclipse	1988	Major Developments	Domark
Touché: The Adventures of the Fifth Musketeer	1995	Clipper Software	CentreGold, U.S. Gold
Tower Toppler	1988	Hewson Consultants	U.S. Gold
Track Attack	1996	Arc Developments	MicroProse
Tracon II	1992	Wesson International	Wesson International
Trade Wars 2002	1990	Epic Interactive Strategy, Martech Software	Epic Interactive Strategy, Martech Software
Traffic Department 2192	1994	P-Squared Productions	Safari Software, Epic MegaGames
The Train: Escape to Normandy	1988	Artech	Accolade
Transarctica	1993	Silmarils	Silmarils
Transport Tycoon	1994	MicroProse	MicroProse
Transport Tycoon Deluxe	1996	MicroProse	MicroProse
Transylvania	1985	Penguin Software	Penguin Software
TRAZ	1989	Cascade	Cascade
Treasure Cove!	1992	The Learning Company	The Learning Company
Treasure MathStorm!	1992	The Learning Company	The Learning Company
Treasure Mountain!	1994	The Learning Company	The Learning Company
Treasures of the Savage Frontier	1992	Stormfront Studios	Strategic Simulations
Treehouse, The	1991	Broderbund	Broderbund
Trek Trivia	1988	Apogee Software	Apogee Software
Trinity	1986	Infocom	Infocom
Triplane Turmoil	1996	Dodekaedron Software	Dodekaedron Software
Triple Play 97	1996	Electronic Arts Canada	Electronic Arts
Trivia Whiz	1988	Micro F/X Software	Apogee Software
Troddlers	1993	Atod	The Sales Curve, Seika
Trog!	1990	Software Creations	Acclaim Entertainment
Trojan	1986	Pacific Dataworks International	Capcom
Trolls	1992	Flair Software	Capstone Software
Troll's Tale	1984	Sierra On-Line	Sierra On-Line
Tunnel B1	1996	NEON Software	Ocean Software
Tunnels of Armageddon	1989	Logical Design Works	California Dreams
Tunnels & Trolls: Crusaders of Khazan	1990	New World Computing	New World Computing, Flying Buffalo, Fiery Dragon Publications
Turbo Outrun	1990	Sega	Sega
Turrican II: The Final Fight	1995	Sun-Project	Rainbow Arts
TV Sports: Basketball	1990	Cinemaware	Mirrorsoft
TV Sports: Boxing	1991	Acme Interactive, Cinemaware	Data East
TV Sports: Football	1989	Cinemaware	Cinemaware
Twilight: 2000	1991	Paragon Software Corporation	MicroProse
Twinsen's Odyssey	1997	Adeline Software	Ubisoft
Typhoon of Steel	1991	Strategic Simulations	Strategic Simulations
Tyrian	1995	Eclipse Software	Epic MegaGames
Tyrian 2000	1999	Eclipse Software	Epic MegaGames
