= V.R.T.O. =

Video game developer

- Formerly: Acme Interactive (1991-1992); Malibu Interactive (1992-1994); Padded Cell Studios (1994-1997)
- Type: Division
- Industry: Video games
- Predecessor: Cinemaware
- Founded: February 21, 1991
- Founder: Robert Jacob
- Defunct: 1998
- Headquarters: Westlake Village, California, United States
- Products: Interactive video games
- Owner: Malibu Comics Entertainment (1992-1994); GameTek (1994-1997); Interplay Entertainment (1997-1998)
- Divisions: Malibu Interactive UK

V.R.T.O. (formerly Acme Interactive, Malibu Interactive and Padded Cell Studios) was an American game developer that was originally formed in 1991 by Cinemaware founder Robert "Bob" Jacob. It develops video games for home consoles, most notably sports games.

== History ==
In 1991, Cinemaware was facing bankruptcy, and the Cinemaware name and brand was sold to Mirrorsoft. Bob Jacob, who was the founder of Cinemaware, decided to form its own successor company called Acme Interactive. It was incorporated on February 21, 1991. The new company inherited the former design team of Cinemaware.

One of Acme Interactive's titles was Wings 2: Aces High, which was a sequel to a title by the company's predecessor Cinemaware. The company lured staff from British game developers Ocean Software, and the Derby area to develop video games after they flew from America, while some went to Derby.

In 1992, the company hit its turning point when the company merged with Malibu Graphics Publishing Group, a comic book publisher, to form Malibu Comics Entertainment, and the video game division was renamed to Malibu Interactive. The company then made video games based on Malibu Comics comic book characters, such as Ex-Mutants.

Under Malibu's ownership, the company incorporated a studio in the United Kingdom, called Malibu Interactive UK, led by Ian McGee. The company has offices in Derby and Wallington, and Tim Follin was later hired by the company as sound designer.

In 1993, the company had a development deal with THQ, whose titles were mostly released under Malibu Games, where Malibu Interactive developed titles, and THQ published it under the Malibu Games label, and one of the planned titles were to be an adaptation of the Ultraverse comic series. Only two games actually developed by the company were released under the Malibu Games label, those being Sports Illustrated: Championship Football and Baseball, and Time Trax, both for the SNES.

The company was America's second-largest independent developer behind Park Place Productions, and hit a series of mass layoffs between 1993 and 1994. Three sets of Malibu employees, namely Joel Jewett, Chris Ward and Mick West formed Neversoft Entertainment, while John Brandwood, Mike Lamb, and Jeff Godfrey went on to found Left Field Productions, Chris Shrigley moved to Walt Disney Computer Software, Stephen Thomson and other members formed Clockwork Tortoise, best known for The Adventures of Batman & Robin for Sega Genesis and Sega CD and the unreleased X-Women: The Sinister Virus for Sega Genesis, and Christine Hsu, the former CEO/CFO of Malibu Comics, started Paradox Development.

The rest of the team members were sold to GameTek and it was renamed to Padded Cell Studios in 1995, shortly after Malibu was sold itself to Marvel Comics in November 1994. In 1997, the company was sold to Interplay, who acquired the publishing rights to the unreleased Jimmy Johnson Football, and it was reincorporated as V.R.T.O., Inc., and it was later defunct in 1998 when one of its titles Warrick Dunn VR Football '99 was left unreleased and all team members joined Mass Media.

== Games ==
| Year | Title | Publisher | Platform | Notes |
As Acme Interactive
| 1991 | Bo Jackson Baseball | Mindscape | MS-DOS, Amiga | Originally planned by Cinemaware, but finished by Acme |
| 1991 | ABC Wide World of Sports Boxing | Mindscape | MS-DOS, Amiga | Originally planned by Cinemaware, but finished by Acme |
| 1991 | TV Sports Hockey | NEC | TurboGrafx-16 | Originally planned by Cinemaware, but finished by Acme |
| 1992 | David Robinson's Supreme Court | Sega of America | Genesis | |
| 1992 | Evander Holyfield's Real Deal Boxing | Sega of America | Genesis | |
| 1992 | Cal Ripken Jr. Baseball | Mindscape | SNES, Genesis | |
| 1992 | Wings 2: Aces High | Namco Hometek | SNES | |
| Unreleased | David Robinson's Supreme Court | Sega of America | Game Gear | |
| Unreleased | Sports Talk Wrestling | Sega of America | Genesis | |
As Malibu Interactive
| 1992 | Ex-Mutants | Sega of America | Genesis | |
| 1992 | Batman Returns | Sega of America | Genesis, Sega CD | |
| 1993 | Thomas the Tank Engine & Friends | THQ | Genesis | |
| 1993 | Greatest Heavyweights | Sega of America | Genesis | |
| 1993 | Joe Montana's NFL Football | Sega of America | Sega CD | |
| 1993 | Cliffhanger | Sony Imagesoft | SNES, Genesis, Sega CD | |
| 1993 | Riddick Bowe Boxing | Extreme Entertainment Group | SNES | |
| 1993 | Chavez | ASC Games | SNES | |
| 1993 | Battle Cars | Namco Hometek | SNES | |
| 1994 | The Smurfs | Infogrames | Sega CD | Developed under Malibu Interactive UK |
| 1994 | Ultraverse Prime | Sony Imagesoft | Sega CD | Developed under Malibu Interactive UK |
| 1994 | Tecmo Super Hockey | Tecmo | Genesis | |
| 1994 | NBA Action '94 | Sega of America | Genesis | |
| 1994 | BattleTech: A Game of Armored Combat | Extreme Entertainment Group | Genesis | |
| 1994 | Sports Illustrated: Championship Football & Baseball | Malibu Games | SNES | Known as All-American Championship Football in Europe |
| 1994 | Time Trax | Malibu Games | SNES | Developed under Malibu Interactive UK |
| 1994 | 3 Ninjas Kick Back | Sony Imagesoft | SNES, Genesis, Sega CD | Developed under Malibu Interactive UK |
| Unreleased | Tecmo Super Hockey | Tecmo | SNES | |
| Unreleased | Sports Illustrated: Championship Football & Baseball | Black Pearl Software | Genesis | |
| Unreleased | Time Trax | Black Pearl Software | Genesis | Developed under Malibu Interactive UK |
| Unreleased | Ultraverse Prime | Sony Imagesoft | SNES, Sega Game Gear | Developed under Malibu Interactive UK |
| Unreleased | The Strangers | Sony Imagesoft | Sega CD | Developed under Malibu Interactive UK |
| Unreleased | Firearm | THQ | SNES, Genesis | Developed under Malibu Interactive UK |
As Padded Cell Studios
| 1996 | NFL '97 | Sega of America | Saturn | |
| 1997 | Jimmy Johnson's VR Football '98 | VR Sports | PlayStation | |
As V.R.T.O., Inc.
| Unreleased | Warrick Dunn's VR Football '98 | VR Sports | Windows, PlayStation | |
