= List of libraries owned by the Walt Disney Company =

Content libraries and catalogs owned by the Walt Disney Company

This is a list of content libraries and catalogs owned by The Walt Disney Company.

== Content libraries ==
=== Walt Disney Studios ===
- Walt Disney Pictures film library
  - Walt Disney Animation Studios (excluding shorts in the public domain)
    - Disneytoon Studios
  - Pixar Animation Studios
  - True-Life Adventures (early documentary series)
- Touchstone Pictures film library
  - DreamWorks Pictures library (2011–2016) (excluding Indian distribution rights, and EMEA distribution rights to the 2013-2016 films only, owned by Reliance Entertainment and Mister Smith Entertainment respectively; however, Lincoln and Bridge of Spies are now distributed by Disney via 20th Century Studios worldwide)
- Hollywood Pictures film library
- Caravan Pictures film library
- Cinergi Pictures film library
- Disneynature
- Buena Vista International
- Star Distribution
- Marvel Studios film library (excluding the Spider-Man films (Homecoming, Far From Home, No Way Home, and Brand New Day), which is now owned by Sony Pictures)
  - Marvel Television (excluding Mutant X, owned by Lionsgate Television)
  - Marvel Animation (including ancillary rights to The Fantastic Four, distributed by Warner Bros., but excluding Marvel Anime, owned by Sony Pictures Entertainment Japan, the Marvel Animated Features direct-to-video film series, owned by Lionsgate Films, and the international distribution rights to certain shows; also includes character elements of The Thing segments of Fred and Barney Meet the Thing, although the show itself is owned and distributed by Warner Bros.)
  - Marvel Studios Animation
- Lucasfilm film library (including ancillary rights to the first four Indiana Jones films, distributed by Paramount Pictures, but excluding films owned by third-party companies)
  - Lucasfilm Animation
- 20th Century Studios (Note: formerly 20th Century Fox) film library (excluding the 2013–2017 DreamWorks Animation film library, which is now owned by Universal Pictures, the Terrytoons film library, which is now owned by Paramount Pictures, films owned by third-party companies and films in the public domain)
  - Fox 2000 Pictures
  - 20th Century Family
  - Fox Atomic
    - Fox Atomic Digital
    - Fox Atomic Comics
  - Fox Faith
  - 20th Century Animation
    - Fox Family Films (including ancillary rights to FernGully: The Last Rainforest, distributed by Shout! Studios under license from Machine Media Advisors)
    - Fox Animation Studios
    - Blue Sky Studios
    - Sullivan Bluth Studios (only films financed by Media Assets, a subsidiary of STAR TV, including international distribution rights to The Pebble and the Penguin, although US rights are owned by MGM)
  - Fox Film (excluding films owned in the public domain)
  - Twentieth Century Pictures
  - 20th Digital Studio
  - New World Pictures (post-1989 films)
  - Regency Enterprises (20%) (only films co-produced with 20th Century Studios and some pre-1999 films released by Warner Bros. Pictures)
  - Fox Digital Entertainment
    - FoxNext (successor)
  - Fox International Productions
  - 20th Century Fox International
- The Muppets Studio film library (excluding Muppets-related films produced and owned by Sony Pictures)
- Searchlight Pictures film library (excluding 28 Days Later, which is now owned by Columbia Pictures)
  - Searchlight Television
- Studio Ghibli film library (home media distribution in Japan, China and Taiwan)
- Disney Music Group discography
  - Walt Disney Records
  - Hollywood Records
    - Fox Music
    - DMG Nashville
    - Mammoth Records
    - Lyric Street Records
      - Carolwood Records
  - Disney Music Publishing
  - Disney Concerts
  - Buena Vista Records
  - RMI Recordings
  - S-Curve Records
  - Disney Pearl

=== Disney Entertainment Television ===
- Walt Disney Television
  - Disney Telefilms
- American Broadcasting Company (excluding the pre-1973 ABC Films library, owned by CBS Studios via Spelling Television)
  - ABC News (including ABC News Studios)
    - ABC News Productions
    - Lincoln Square Productions
    - ABC Audio
      - ABC News Radio
  - ABC Owned Television Stations
  - Greengrass Productions (excluding Wild West C.O.W.-Boys of Moo Mesa, Bump in the Night, The Secret Garden, and Hypernauts, owned by WildBrain)
  - ABC Circle Films
  - ABC Motion Pictures
  - ABC Pictures International
  - ABC Productions
    - ABC Pictures
  - Keep Calm and Carry On Productions
  - Palomar Pictures International (pre-1972)
  - Selmur Productions
  - Selznick International Pictures/Vanguard Films (excluding A Star Is Born, The Prisoner of Zenda and Gone with the Wind, distributed by Warner Bros., with the latter two owned by Turner Entertainment Co.)
  - Valleycrest Productions
  - Victor Television Productions
- Freeform
  - BV Family Productions, Inc.
  - BVS Entertainment (formerly Saban Entertainment)
    - BVS International, NV. (formerly Saban International, NV.)
    - SIP Animation (formerly Saban International Paris)
      - Créativité et Développement (excluding programs co-produced with AB Productions currently owned by Mediawan through Mediawan Thematics and Mediawan Kids & Family)
        - DIC Audiovisuel (select programs)
    - Libra Pictures
    - Fox Children's Network, Inc.
    - Marvel Productions/New World Animation (excluding non-Marvel/Muppets third-party productions)
      - DePatie–Freleng Enterprises (excluding non-Marvel/Fox third-party productions and co-productions with The Mirisch Company, with the latter owned by United Artists)
  - Television South
- Disney Television Studios
  - 20th Television
    - 20th Television Animation
    - Fox 21
    - Foxstar Productions
    - New Regency Television International (50%) (post-1998)
    - Touchstone Television
      - TVM Productions, Inc.
      - Final Stretch Productions
      - Fox World
      - Fox Lab
    - Metromedia Producers Corporation
    - FNM Films
    - New World Television (post-1989 programs, excluding distribution rights for some 1990–91 programs, held by Sony Pictures Television)
      - Four Star Television (excluding Wanted Dead or Alive, owned by StudioCanal)
      - Gold Key Entertainment
      - Genesis Entertainment (excluding Tales from the Crypt, owned by Warner Bros.)
    - MTM Enterprises (excluding The Trials of Rosie O'Neill, owned by Multicom Entertainment Group)
    - 20th Television (original incarnation, syndication company)
    - ABC Signature
      - Touchstone Television (original incarnation)
  - Walt Disney Television Alternative
- ESPN, LLC (72%)
  - Big Fights, Inc.
  - ESPN Films
  - ESPN Books
- Disney Kids & Family
  - Disney Channel
  - Disney Junior
  - Disney XD
  - Radio Disney
  - Disney Television Animation
  - It's a Laugh Productions
- Disney+ originals
- National Geographic Partners (73%) (joint venture with National Geographic Society)
  - National Geographic Global Networks
    - National Geographic Studios
  - National Geographic Documentary Films
  - National Geographic Magazine
  - National Geographic Books
  - National Geographic Maps
- FX Productions
  - Bluebush Productions, LLC
  - FX Movie Channel
- Soapnet
- Disney Digital Network
- Jetix Europe
  - Jetix Animation Concepts
- Fox International Studios

=== Disney Publishing Worldwide ===
- Disney Comics
- Disney Press
- Hyperion Books (excluding Hyperion's adult trade list, sold to Hachette)
- Disney·Hyperion
  - Rick Riordan Presents
- Marvel Comics
  - Marvel Entertainment
  - Magazine Management
    - Humorama
    - Timely Comics
    - Atlas Comics
  - Malibu Comics
    - Malibu Interactive/Acme Interactive library (excluding ports and games for Namco (Battle Cars and Wings 2: Aces High), Electronic Arts (Hard Nova), etc.)
    - Aircel Comics
    - Eternity Comics
    - Adventure Publications
  - Star Comics
  - Razorline
  - Tsunami
  - Ultimate Marvel
  - Amalgam Comics (co-owned with DC Comics)
  - Paramount Comics (co-owned with Paramount Pictures)
  - Epic Comics
  - CrossGen
  - Welsh Publishing Group
  - Marvel Press
    - Marvel Books
  - Curtis Magazines/Marvel Magazine Group
    - Marvel Monsters Group
  - Marvel 2099
  - Marvel Absurd
  - Marvel Age/Adventures
  - Marvel Edge
  - Marvel Knights
  - Marvel Illustrated
  - Marvel Mangaverse
  - Marvel Music
  - Marvel Next
  - Marvel Noir
  - Marvel UK
    - Marvel Frontier
  - Marvel Comics 2
  - Icon Comics
  - Infinite Comics
  - MAX Comics
  - Toy Biz/Marvel Toys
  - 20th Century Comics
- Disney·Jump at the Sun
- Disney·Lucasfilm Press
- Disney Editions
- Disney Libri
- Disney Libros (Spain)
- ABC Daytime Press
- Kingswell
- Freeform
- Disney Book Apps
- Disney Learning
  - Disney Educational Productions
  - Disney English
  - Disney Imagicademy

=== Disney Entertainment ===
- Hulu, LLC
- Streamboat Willie Productions
- UTV Software Communications
- Disney Star
  - Star Studio18 film library
- The Walt Disney Company India
- Patagonik Film Group
- Onyx Collective

=== Disney Interactive ===
- Disney Interactive Studios
  - Black Rock Studio
  - Creature Feep
  - Gamestar
  - Wideload Games
  - Rocket Pack
  - Playdom
    - Acclaim Games
- Disney Games
- Toysmart
- Disney Mobile
  - Tapulous
- Disney Online
- Disney Online Studios
- Disney Canada Inc.
- Marvel Games
- Lucasfilm Games
- Studio Ex
- Starwave
  - Infoseek
- 20th Century Games
  - Fox Interactive (predecessor)
    - Fox Toons Interactive
    - Fox Sports Interactive
    - Fox Arcade

=== Music publishing ===
- ABC Circle Music Inc. (BMI)
- ABC Family Music Publishing (BMI)
- Agarita Music (ASCAP)
- American Broadcasting Music Inc. (ASCAP)
- Bantha Music (BMI)
- Birch Street Music (ASCAP)
- Buena Vista Music Co. (BMI)
- Falferious Music (BMI)
- FFM Publishing (ASCAP)
- Five Hundred South Songs (SESAC)
- Fox Film Music Corporation (BMI)
- Fuzzy Muppet Songs (ASCAP)
- Holpic Music, Inc. (BMI)
- Hollywood Pictures Music (ASCAP)
- Mad Muppet Melodies (BMI)
- Marvel Characters Music (BMI)
- Marvel Comics Music (ASCAP)
- Marvel Hero Tunes (SESAC)
- Marvel Superhero Music (BMI)
- Middle Street Music (BMI)
- Pixar Music (BMI)
- Pixar Talking Pictures (ASCAP)
- Pixar Tunes (SESAC)
- Ronzo Road Music (SESAC)
- Seven Peaks Music (ASCAP)
  - Hobbitville Music (ASCAP)
  - Vistaville Music (ASCAP)
- Seven Summits Music (BMI)
- TCF Music Publishing Inc. (ASCAP)
- Touchstone Pictures Music & Songs, Inc. (ASCAP)
- Twentieth Tunes Music Inc. (SESAC)
- Utapau Music (BMI)
- Walt Disney Music Company (ASCAP)
- Wampa-Tauntaun Music (ASCAP)
- Wonderland Music Company Inc. (BMI)

== See also ==
- List of ABC programs
- List of 20th Television programs
- List of Freeform original films
- List of programs produced by ABC Signature
- List of assets owned by the Walt Disney Company
