= Riddick Bowe Boxing =

1993 video game

- North American SNES box art
- Developers: Malibu Interactive; Micronet Co., Ltd. (Game Gear)
- Publishers: NA: Extreme Entertainment Group; JP: Micronet
- Platforms: Super NES, Game Boy, Game Gear
- Release: Super NES: JP: November 23, 1993; NA: January 1994; Game Gear: NA: 1993; JP: January 21, 1994; Game Boy: NA: January 1994; EU: 1994
- Genre: Boxing/Fighting
- Modes: Single-player (exhibition or career); Two-player (exhibition only)

Riddick Bowe Boxing (リディック･ボウ ボクシング, Ridikku Bou Bokushingu) is a boxing video game released in 1993 for the Super Nintendo Entertainment System. It was also released for the Game Boy and Game Gear consoles.

The game was released for the Super NES in Mexico and, partially, in American Southwest states, as Chavez and starred Julio César Chávez instead of Riddick Bowe. It is identical except that the Spanish language is used instead of English.

== Overview ==
Riddick Bowe Boxing features gameplay that was practically identical to that featured in Greatest Heavyweights. The graphics are similar in function, but the artwork was completely redrawn. The visuals of a fight are made up of 2D sprite-based boxers and a simple boxing ring. The game features a career mode in which the player fights their way through all the boxers in the game until facing Bowe himself. The game also features an exhibition mode in which players can play as any boxer and put them in matches against any boxer in the game.

== Gameplay ==
=== During the fight ===
During a fight, each boxer has a healthmeter that decreases whenever the player is hit. When the health meter reaches zero and the player is punched the player suffers a knockdown. Large amounts of punishment to the head also result in visible cuts.

If a boxer is knocked down three times in a single round, the fight ends in a TKO. Unlike in real-life boxing matches, a fight never stops for other reasons; a boxer can be pummeled for an entire fight without throwing one punch in return, but unless he is knocked down three times, or he fails to get up in ten seconds after being knocked down, the fight is allowed to continue until the round ends or fight scheduled goes the distance.

=== Career mode ===
During career mode, the player creates his own boxer. Options to edit include name, hair color, skin color. Each boxer in the game had three attributes: power, stamina, and speed. Riddick Bowe has the highest stats, but starts losing them after losing the championship. Eventually, he retires in the course of the game's career mode, after which only resetting the internal data will bring him back.

During career mode, all of the attributes are increased by allotted training bonuses. As the boxer progresses from match to match, his statistics start to fade. After 35 fights, his hair turns from normal to grey. After 40 fights, the boxer is forced to retire even if he has never beaten the champion. Losing two fights in a row will also cause the player's boxer to retire.

== Reception ==
Electronic Gaming Monthly gave the SNES version a 7.2 out of 10 average, commenting, "Quite simply, this is the best boxing game for the SNES out there. The punches of your player are incredibly easy to do and it controls like a dream." Reviewing the SNES Chavez release, GamePro noted that it has "abundant options" but deemed it a mediocre game due to the rudimentary gameplay and uninvolving graphics and sounds. They also warned prospective buyers that the game and manual are both in Spanish.

Reviewing the Game Gear version, GamePro criticized the lack of backgrounds and weak sound effects, and said of the gameplay, "Somehow, your fighter moves around and blocks punches, even if you don't press any buttons. The buttons you do press don't respond quickly or accurately enough to make you feel like a champ."
