= Tear down the wall =

Tear down the wall(s) may refer to:

== Albums ==
- Tear Down the Walls, a 1964 album by Fred Neil and Vince Martin
- Across the Earth: Tear Down the Walls, a 2009 album by Hillsong United
- Tear Down These Walls, a 1988 album by Billy Ocean

== Songs ==
- "Tear down the wall!", a maxim from "The Trial" by Pink Floyd
- "Tear Down The Wall", a song by Demons and Wizard from the album Demons and Wizards
- "Tear Down The Walls", a song by Arch Enemy from the album Anthems of Rebellion

== Other uses ==
- "Tear Down the Walls", an episode of television program In the Heat of the Night
- Tear down this wall!, a challenge from United States President Ronald Reagan to Soviet leader Mikhail Gorbachev to destroy the Berlin Wall
- Tearing Down the Wall of Sound, biography of Sixties record producer Phil Spector, written by Mick Brown
- Tear Down The Wall, an MS-DOS computer game
