= Wings (1990 video game) =

- Amiga cover art
- Developers: Cinemaware (Amiga); Raylight Games (GBA)
- Publisher: Cinemaware
- Producer: Jerry Albright
- Designer: John Cutter
- Programmers: Dan Pinal; Tim Hays
- Artist: Jeffrey Hilbers
- Writer: Kenneth Goldstein
- Composer: Greg Haggard
- Platforms: Amiga, Game Boy Advance
- Release: October 1990 (Amiga); 18 October 2002 (GBA)
- Genres: Shoot 'em up, Air combat simulation
- Mode: Single player

Wings is a World War I video game developed and published by Cinemaware. It was released for the Amiga in 1990. The action sequences are similar in style to those of the 1927 silent film Wings.

An enhanced version was released for the Game Boy Advance as Wings Advance in 2002. A remake of the original, Wings! Remastered, was published in 2014 and 2015 for Windows, MacOS, Android, and iOS.

== Gameplay ==
In Wings, the player controls a World War I fighter pilot, including flying, firing the machine gun, and dropping bombs. The game is played from a first-person perspective, and the cockpit view shows the plane's instruments and the surrounding landscape.

The game features many types of missions, such as escorting bombers or having dogfights with enemy planes.

The game has a variety of planes to choose from, each with its own unique strengths and weaknesses. Some planes are faster but have weaker armor, while others are slower but can withstand more damage.

== Plot ==
Starting in 1916 as a rookie, the main character goes through his military career until the end of the war in 1918 with the Royal Flying Corps and later the Royal Air Force. The individual missions are chronicled by a daily diary. The objectives of the missions are linked to historical events, such as the shooting down of well-known flying aces such as Manfred von Richthofen.

== Reception ==
Wings for the Amiga was well received by critics. Computer Gaming World called it "a whopping good arcade experience ... exciting, novel, and addicting." In a survey of four World War I flight simulations, the magazine stated that Wings was the best choice for 'arcade' (action) gamers; two surveys of strategy and war games gave it three and a half stars out of five. Review scores in other magazines included 78% from Amiga Action, 79% from Amiga Format, 82.5% from Advanced Computer Entertainment, 87% from Zero, 90% from Amiga User International, 91% from The One, 94% from Computer + Video Games, and 94% from CU Amiga.

In 1993, Amiga World ranked Wings third on their list of all-time Amiga game hits. In 1996, Computer Gaming World ranked Wings for the Amiga as the 65th best game of all time for its "masterful combination of arcade action, flight simulation, and cinematic story." Retro Gamer included it on their list of top ten Amiga 500 games, stating: "You couldnt ask for a more varied game than Cinemawares Wings ... that was way ahead of its time. Its hard to believe that the game was made in 1990 as the 3D sections looked absolutely incredible and far in advance of anything that had appeared on consoles, PC or even the arcades at the time," and adding its story "told of the main characters eerily realistic wartime experiences, provoking an emotional response in the player that is all too rare in retro and modern gaming alike." In 1996, GamesMaster ranked the game 68th in their "Top 100 Games of All Time."

Wings Advance was well received too, receiving an averaged Metacritic score of 80. Craig Harris of IGN, who did not play the original Amiga version, gave the game an overall score of 7.5/10, calling it "a cool collection of three different game designs that, while fun in their own right, can't stand on their own because of gameplay limitations."

== Legacy ==
=== Wings Advance ===
The Game Boy Advance version, Wings Advance, is roughly the same game as the original, although it has been updated with improved graphics, new features, and increased gameplay options. The main difference is that the player can now opt to fly missions as a German pilot, experiencing the war from the opposite perspective.

=== Wings! Remastered ===
A campaign to create a Wings remake was put on Kickstarter at August 10, 2012 by Cinemaware with an intent to recreate the game in HD for mobile and desktop platforms (iOS, Android, Windows, Mac OS X). It aimed to recreate the original games experience and appeal. It was announced to be developed by Raylight Games, authors of Wings for the GBA, under Cinemaware's production leadership and coordination as Cinemaware first title in development since 2003's Robin Hood: Defender of the Crown. The Kickstarter project was to be funded if at least $350,000 was pledged by September 11, 2012, but was unsuccessful, reaching only $51,740. In November 2013, a second attempt (this time under the title Wings! Remastered) on Kickstarter was successful; earning $91,380 by the end of its 30-day run.

The game was officially released by Kalypso Media for Windows and MacOS on October 27, 2014 and was immediately available for Windows on Steam and GOG, though the MacOS version was only available for the game's Kickstarter backers until it was released on the Mac App Store on May 6, 2015. The game was also released with touch screen controls for Android and iOS in May 2015.

== See also ==
- Wings 2: Aces High
