= EGames (video game developer) =

American software publisher and developer

eGames Inc
- Type: Public
- Industry: Video games
- Predecessor: Romtech
- Founded: 1992; 34 years ago
- Defunct: 2012; 14 years ago
- Successor: Tamino Minerals, Inc.
- Headquarters: Langhorne, Pennsylvania
- Key people: Joseph A. Falsetti (Chairman, and co-founder); John Baer (VP and co-founder); Gerald W. Klein (President, CEO); Thomas W. Murphy (CFO); Rich Siporin (VP of Sales & Marketing)
- Products: PC games; see article
- Revenue: ▼$3,956,000 USD (2008)
- Number of employees: 15 (2005)

eGames, Inc. was an American software publisher and developer for casual and traditional computer games based in Langhorne, Pennsylvania.

== History ==
eGames was originally called Rom-Tech when it went public in 1996. The public company was formed by a merger between a software sales company (Romtech) and one of the first educational multi-media CD-ROM development companies called Applied Optical Media based in West Chester, Pennsylvania. Soon after going public, Romtech acquired a software development company based in San Luis Obispo, California that created SOHO software, and also shut down operations at Applied Optical Media.

eGames' flight simulator Xtreme Air Racing was a runner-up for GameSpot's annual "Best Simulation on PC" award, which went to Flanker 2.5. In late 2005, eGames acquired Cinemaware, a game company founded in the eighties who produced a series of "interactive movie" games including widely acclaimed Defender of the Crown. In 2006, eGames released the first titles under its new affiliated label, Cinemaware Marquee. Through Cinemaware Marquee, eGames brought traditional games developed around the world to retail. Cinemaware Marquee titles include Space Rangers 2: Dominators, Independent Game Festival grand prize winner Darwinia, and Moscow to Berlin: Red Siege. eGames announced that it would be reviving many of the classic Cinemaware titles, beginning with Defender of the Crown.

With the September 2005 release of Boss Hunter: Revenge is Sweet!, an office-themed arcade-style game where the player chases their boss with a wide variety of work-related weaponry and early 2007 launch of Defender of the Crown: Heroes Live Forever, eGames began in-house game development efforts working primarily with Brazil-based TechFront Studios, Ltd. eGames' third internally developed title, Burger Island launched in May 2007 in conjunction with Sandlot Games. It was distributed by Yahoo! Games for a two-week period, and was the number one downloadable game in terms of sales and downloads on Yahoo! in its debut week.

Following the success of Burger Island, eGames developed several additional titles with TechFront, including sequel Burger Island 2: The Missing Ingredient (2009), hidden object vampire adventure The Dracula Files (2009), pet adoption time management game Purrfect Pet Shop (2008), city-building puzzler Puzzle City (2007), fashion design time management game Satisfashion (2008), licensed puzzler Rubik's Cube Challenge (2007), and licensed comic hidden object game Three Stooges: Treasure Hunt Hijinx (2008). In addition to PC publication, Burger Island was released for the Nintendo DS, Nintendo Wii, and iOS platforms. Satisfashion was released on the Nintendo DS and Wii, while Puzzle City made its way to the DS.

eGames became known as Entertainment Games, following the acquisition of Heyday Games in June 2011.

Following this, the company focused its efforts on creating a Facebook game known as Retro World, followed by an unsuccessful Kickstarter campaign called Global Race Club.

Entertainment Games, Inc. ceased trading as an entertainment company in April 2012 due to financial difficulties. The company name, ticker symbol EGAM, and public company structure were acquired by a mining company, Tamino Minerals, in a reverse merger.

== Bundled adware ==
eGames Inc. was one of the first companies to include advertising in their commercially bundled software. Several eGames titles included adware called "TSAdBot" from the Conducent Affiliate Network.

== Cinemaware Marquee titles ==
- Buccaneer's Bounty
- Deer Drive
- Darwinia
- Moscow to Berlin: Red Siege
- Neighbors From Hell: On Vacation
- Space Rangers 2: Rise of the Dominators
- Wizard's War Chest

== eGames published titles ==
- The Dracula Files
- Booym
- Burger Island
- Burger Island 2: The Missing Ingredient
- Defender of the Crown: Heroes Live Forever
- Gadgets
- Marble Blaster
- MiniGolf Master: Miniverse
- Purrfect Pet Shop
- Puzzle City
- Satisfashion
- Rubik's Cube Challenge
- The Three Stooges: Treasure Hunt Hijinx
- Boss Hunter: Revenge is Sweet!
- Speedy Eggbert series
- Crazy Drake
- Spooky Castle: The Adventures Of Kid Mystic
- Safari Kongo
- Mini Car Racing
- Pinball Master
- Pinball: Full-Tilt Fun!
- 4 Elements
- Twistingo
- Drop!
- The Lost Inca Prophecy
- TV Guide Trivia
- Wild Wheels

== Notes ==
The company should not be confused with the e-games.com or eGames Inc, Malaysia which used to host MMO games, or E-Games Philippines-IP e-games, a wholly owned subsidiary of IPVG (Intellectual Property Ventures Group), a local game publisher in the Philippines.
