= Lords of the Rising Sun =

1989 video game

- Developer: Cinemaware
- Publisher: Cinemaware
- Director: Doug Barnett
- Composer: Bob Lindstrom
- Platforms: Amiga, PC Engine CD, CD-i, X68000
- Release: 1989
- Mode: Single-player

Lords of the Rising Sun is a 1989 video game by Cinemaware, game design and art by Doug Barnett, released for the Amiga among other systems. Like the earlier Defender of the Crown, it was a mix of map-based strategy and arcade-style mini games as the player, playing as one of the famous Japanese generals Yoshitsune or Yoritomo, fights to pacify Japan by force. In the short documentary "The Total War Story", Mike Simpson, studio director for the company Creative Assembly said that the company's Total War series of games had been influenced by Lords of the Rising Sun.

== Reception ==
Computer Gaming World gave the game a positive review, admiring the cinematic qualities of the game as well as the mix of action and strategy elements. In 1990 and 1993 surveys of strategy and war games, however, the magazine gave the game three stars out of five, stating that it was "only marginally" about history.

Ernesto Williams reviewed Lords of the Rising Sun for Games International magazine, and gave it 4 stars out of 5, and stated that "Lords of the Rising Sun has set a standard that others will find hard to follow. And follow they will."
