= Time Trax (video game) =

1994 video game

- North American cover art
- Developer: Malibu Interactive
- Publisher: Malibu Games
- Producers: George Sinfield; Ian McGee; Steve Ryno
- Designer: Terry Lloyd
- Programmer: Robert Toone
- Artists: Lee Pullen; Robert Hemphill; Terry Lloyd
- Composers: Richard Joseph (SNES); Tim Follin (Genesis)
- Platforms: Super Nintendo Entertainment System; Sega Genesis
- Release: SNES: NA: April 1994; EU: May-June 1994; Genesis; Cancelled
- Genres: Action, platform
- Mode: Single-player

Time Trax is a 1994 action-platform video game developed by Malibu Interactive and published by Malibu Games for the Super Nintendo Entertainment System. It is based on the television series of the same name, which aired from 1993 to 1994. The story follows police Captain Lambert as he tries to stop criminal fugitives from changing history and gaining control of the future, with aid from his supercomputer assistant. The player controls Lambert across eight levels, apprehending enemies using a stunner weapon capable of sending them back to the future. The player can also use martial arts to defeat enemies, or use a time ability to slow them down.

Time Trax was produced by Malibu Interactive, an American-British studio established by Cinemaware co-founder Bob Jacob with former staff from Ocean Software and Software Creations. It was co-produced by George Sinfield, Ian McGee, and Steve Ryno. The soundtrack was scored by Richard Joseph. A Sega Genesis version, featuring music composed by Tim Follin, was developed but never released until a prototype was leaked online. The game garnered a generally favorable critical reception; praise was given to the audiovisual presentation but most reviewers felt divided regarding its gameplay, while criticism was geared towards aspects such as the difficulty and lack of continues.

== Gameplay ==
Example of the gameplay from Super Nintendo Entertainment System (SNES) version

Time Trax is a side-scrolling action-platform game based on the television series of the same name, similar to Rolling Thunder (1986) and the Super Star Wars titles. The plot follows police Captain Lambert, with aid from his supercomputer assistant S.E.L.M.A. Lambert travels back in time using the Trax device to capture commander Sepp Dietrich and doctor Mordecai Sahmbi. Sahmbi has sent criminal fugitives back in time to assist him in his plan of changing history and gain control of the future.

The player controls Lambert across eight levels in order to confront Dietrich and Sahmbi, while apprehending criminal fugitives sent back in time. Lambert is equipped with the "Pellet Projection Tube" (PPT) weapon, which can be used to stun enemies, or shoot pellets that transport them back to the future. The player can also use martial arts to defeat enemies, or use a time ability to slow them down. The player starts with three lives at the beginning and more can be obtained by finding heart icons in each level, but the game is over if all of them are lost.

== Development and release ==
Time Trax for the Super Nintendo Entertainment System is based on the television series of the same name, which aired from 1993 to 1994. It was developed by Malibu Interactive, a defunct American-British game developer first established by Cinemaware co-founder Bob Jacob under the name Acme Interactive with former staff from Ocean Software and Software Creations. The company merged with Malibu Graphics in 1992 to form Malibu Comics and becoming its software division. It was co-produced by George Sinfield, Ian McGee, and Steve Ryno. Terry Lloyd served as designer, with Robert Toone acting as main programmer. Lloyd was also responsible for the artwork along with Lee Pullen and Robert Hemphill. The soundtrack was scored by English composer Richard Joseph.

Time Trax was announced for both the SNES and Sega Genesis at the 1993 Consumer Electronics Show, with a release date in early 1994. The SNES version was first published in North America in April 1994 (although some sources list October 1993 and March 1994), and later in Europe between May and June of that year by Malibu Games (a name used by THQ for Nintendo games). The Sega Genesis version was going to be published by Black Pearl Software (a name used by THQ for Sega games). Despite being reviewed in major gaming publications, this version was never released until a prototype ROM image in a fully finished state was leaked online in 2013. The Genesis version was distinguished by its soundtrack, scored by English composer Tim Follin using a sound driver written by Dean Belfield.

== Reception ==
Reception

Review scores
Publication	Score	
Publication	Sega Genesis	SNES
Consoles +	N/A	87%
Computer and Video Games	N/A	89%
Electronic Gaming Monthly	7/10, 7/10, 6/10, 7/10, 7/10	N/A
Game Informer	6.75/10	N/A
Game Players	69%	62%
GameFan	N/A	78%, 78%, 80%, 86% (Note: GameFan's review was by four critics with four different ratings.)
GamePro	16.5/20 (Note: GamePro scored the Genesis versions of Time Trax 4.5/5 twice for sound and fun factor, 4/5 for graphics, and 3.5/5 for control.)	17/20 (Note: GamePro scored the SNES version of Time Trax 4.5/5 twice for graphics and fun factor, and the same amount of 4/5 ratings for sound and control.)
GamesMaster	N/A	72/100
Joypad	N/A	84%
Official Nintendo Magazine	N/A	87/100
Player One	N/A	79%
Superjuegos	N/A	85/100
Total!	N/A	(UK) 70% (DE) 4
Video Games (DE)	N/A	78%
VideoGames & Computer Entertainment	8/10	8/10
Electronic Games	C+	82%
Games World	N/A	80/100
Nintendo Acción	N/A	70/100
Super Control	N/A	54%

Time Trax garnered generally favorable reviews from critics. Video Games's Robert Zengerle called it an "excellent action platformer." Games World magazine labelled it as a fun platform/shoot 'em up title, and celebrated its technical use of the Super Nintendo hardware. Paul Davies and Andy McVittie of Nintendo Magazine System (Official Nintendo Magazine) praised the presentation, detailed visuals, audio, gameplay, and replayability. GamePro's Manny LaMancha gave positive remarks to its audiovisual presentation and high level of challenge. Computer and Video Games summarized their review by writing: "Challenging, absorbing and loads of fun to play - one of the best platform beat-'em-ups on the SNES."

GameFan's four reviewers regarded it as a good action-platform title, highlighting its detailed character animation, solid gameplay mechanics, and high degree of difficulty, while criticizing the music. Player One's Julien Van De Steene commended the animations and playability, but found the music "cheesy" and felt that the graphics underutilized the Super Nintendo's capabilities. Superjuegos' Juan Carlos Sanz lauded the game's backgrounds and large bosses, but disapproved of the enemy sprites and the limited number of weapons.

Richard Homsy and Nicolas Gavet of Consoles + commended the "well thought-out" scenario, graphical effects, fast animation movements, audio, and playability. However, both Homsy and Gavet commented that the lack of continues may seem off-putting. Joypad's Olivier Prézeau and Nini Nourdine also criticized the lack of continue system, while reserving praise for the graphics, sound, controls, and smooth scrolling. Game Players's Erik Lundrian argued that the soundtrack added suspense to the game, but noted the lack of passwords or continues.

Spanish publication Nintendo Acción gave positive remarks to the audiovisual presentation but noted the character's minimal fighting ability. Total!'s Will Groves considered its gameplay enjoyable but uninspired. Writing for the German edition, Hans-Joachim Amann deemed it as a below-average title. GamesMaster's Tim Tucker commended its sound and playability reminiscent of the Super Star Wars games, but found the graphics average and expressed mixed feelings regarding lastability. British publication Super Control criticized the game's sub-standard audiovisual presentation and lack of originality.
