= Tecmo Super Hockey =

1995 video game

- Developer: Malibu Interactive
- Publisher: Tecmo
- Composer: Chip Burwell
- Platform: Sega Genesis
- Release: February 1995
- Genre: Professional hockey
- Modes: Single-player, multiplayer

Tecmo Super Hockey is a professional hockey video game that was developed by Malibu Interactive and published by Tecmo's American division, and released in 1995 for the Sega Genesis. An SNES version was planned, but cancelled. It was not licensed by the NHL, but did have a license from the NHLPA.

The game received mixed reviews from critics, who called the game overly simplistic.

== Gameplay ==
The game can be played by one or two players, and includes both preseason and regular games. Playing a full season is also possible, with real NHL players of the time and stats in eight categories.

The game features brief animated fight sequences that appear randomly to add excitement.

== Reception ==
Slapshot McGraw of GamePro praised the many options but criticized the sluggishness of the moves, and concluded "this simplistic cart probably won't satisfy serious gamers", only suggesting the game "if your store is out of NHL '95 or Brett Hull Hockey".

Game Players called the game "an arcade-style cartridge with hints of a sim" which is entertaining but repetitive.

Mega Fun magazine rated the game 39%, calling the game poorly programmed and the movement "like brontosaurs over the ice".

Next Generation reviewed the game, rating it two stars out of five, and stated that "Tecmo Super Hockey winds up with the rest of the wanna-bes, who would be lucky to lace the skates of EA's phenomenal NHL '95."

== See also ==
- Tecmo Bowl
- Tecmo Super Baseball
