= Moscow to Berlin: Red Siege =

2006 video game

- Developers: INtex Publishing; Monte Cristo
- Publishers: GER: Koch Media; NA: Cinemaware Marquee
- Platform: Windows
- Release: GER: October 7, 2005; NA: June 28, 2006
- Genre: Real-time strategy
- Mode: Single-player

Moscow to Berlin: Red Siege is a Windows title developed by German-based INtex Publishing in cooperation with Monte Cristo. It takes place on the Eastern Front of World War II and is an addition to Monte Cristo's World War II Battle collection, in the line of D-Day, Battle of the Bulge, and Desert Rats. The fundamentals of gameplay are similar to the prequel games, but new units and settings bring fresh life into this game. True to life history lessons help the player evaluate their plans and strategy as they work on either German or Soviet campaigns in the fight from Moscow to Berlin.

== Reception ==
Reception

Aggregate score
Aggregator	Score
Metacritic	57/100

Review scores
Publication	Score
1Up.com	C
GameSpot	4.6/10
GamesRadar+	2/5
GameZone	6.8/10
IGN	6.2/10

Moscow to Berlin: Red Siege received mixed reviews from critics. On Metacritic, the game received a score of 57/100 based on 18 reviews, indicating "mixed or average reviews".
