= NFL '97 =

1996 video game

- Cover art picturing Kordell Stewart
- Developers: GameTek; Padded Cell Studios
- Publisher: Sega
- Series: Sega NFL
- Platform: Sega Saturn
- Release: NA: November 20, 1996
- Genre: Sports
- Modes: Single-player, multiplayer (1-8 players)

NFL '97 is a football video game released exclusively for the Sega Saturn. New gameplay features included the ability to control the speed with which the ball is thrown and the use of a blue arc to track possible receivers.

The game was originally developed as Jimmy Johnson Football before Sega decided to release it with the NFL '97 name, while the PlayStation version was separately picked up by Interplay under the VR Sports label, and became Jimmy Johnson's VR Football '98, after being originally licensed to Konami.

== Gameplay ==
NFL '97 is an American football simulation featuring all 30 National Football League teams and their respective players and stadiums from the 1996 season. The game includes Exhibition, Practice and Season modes, the latter allowing players to compete in a full 16-game season, shortened four- or eight-game seasons, or proceed directly to the playoffs. Team and individual player statistics are tracked throughout the season.

The game features a play editor allowing players to create and modify offensive plays, including the formation, ball carrier and individual player routes. Custom plays can be named, saved and added to a team's playbook. Players can also assemble custom teams using players from existing NFL rosters.

The passing system allows players to control the speed of a throw, while optional on-screen indicators display the intended landing point of passes, the first-down line and receiver coverage. Additional settings allow players to adjust weather conditions, wind, playing surfaces and camera perspectives.

== Development and release ==
NFL '97 originated as a project developed by GameTek under the title Jimmy Johnson Football. Sega subsequently acquired the Sega Saturn version and released it as NFL '97. Meanwhile, the PlayStation version passed from GameTek to Konami and subsequently to Interplay Entertainment, which released it under the title Jimmy Johnson's VR Football '98.

The Saturn game's development credits identify Andy Green as lead programmer for graphics and the user interface and Mike Knauer was responsible for artificial intelligence programming. Bobby King was credited with play design, and Bernie Whang and King served as GameTek's producers. Sega's production staff included executive producer Manny Granillo and producer David Locke.

== Reception ==
Reception

Aggregate score
Aggregator	Score
GameRankings	57% (4 reviews)

Review scores
Publication	Score
Electronic Gaming Monthly	4.5/10
GameRevolution	B+
GameSpot	4.8/10
Next Generation	1/5

NFL 97 received mostly mixed reviews, with American publications being more critical than their German counterparts. Critics highly praised the play editor, but criticized the player animations, the camera, and various aspects of the gameplay. Tom Ham elaborated in GameSpot: "For example, it's hard to distinguish who the receiver is, and the quarterback takes too long to hand the ball off. Even executing a kickoff was painful." Next Generation found the most fault with the passing arc, while GamePro focused on the limited number of player moves, and concluded that "with so many serious flaws, the game's just no fun to play." Kraig Kujawa of Electronic Gaming Monthly simply said that "it hurts to play NFL '97." Colin Ferris gave it a positive review in Game Revolution, citing the playbook editor, bigger player graphics, and control of passing arc.

German publications were generally more favourable. Video Games awarded NFL '97 69%, praising its accessibility and visual aids, including markings indicating the first-down line and passing trajectories. Mega Fun gave the game 75%, appreciating its passing mechanics and tactical options while finding its computer-controlled opponents inferior to those in Madden NFL '97. Sega Magazin awarded it 78%, praising its extensive customisation options and play editor, although reviewer Ulf Schneider criticised the simplistic artificial intelligence and unimpressive graphics and sound.
