= The King of Chicago =

- Amiga cover art
- Developers: Cinemaware; Master Designer Software
- Publishers: Cinemaware; Mindscape
- Designer: Doug Sharp
- Platforms: Amiga, Atari ST, Apple IIGS, MS-DOS, Classic Mac OS, X68000
- Release: 1987
- Genre: Action-adventure
- Mode: Single-player

The King of Chicago is a 1986 action-adventure video game by Doug Sharp. Based on numerous Hollywood mobster movies, this game is set in the 1930s, but some sequences towards the end of the game take place in 1986. The Macintosh version of the game is animated using claymation, while other versions utilize drawn graphics.

== Description ==
The protagonist, Pinky (left), and Ben (right), another member of the gang, as shown in the Macintosh version. The Mac version uses claymation and monochrome graphics

The same scene as above, as shown in the Amiga version

The player starts in Chicago with a small mafia-type mob and follow Al Capone in being the mob-king of the city. The goal of the game is to increase the size of one's gang in order to take over all mobster activity in the city. The player must do this by a certain date in order to be included in the formation of the New York syndicate.

The game features many mobster activities, such as drive-by shootings, bombings, illegal gambling and bribing of corrupt government officials. The player must murder and out-deal his opponents in order to win control of the city. As if that weren't enough, the player also has to stay one step ahead of the law and keep his girlfriend satisfied by catering to her whims and desires, or risk losing her.

The game has many endings determined by the choices the player makes. Wrong choices could end in the player's death or arrest. But there are several ways to win the game; one such way is to kill the leader of the main rival gang.

== Ports ==
This game was first developed by Doug Sharp on the Macintosh, then limited to a monochrome display, using graphics based on digitized images of clay models. The game was given a complete visual redesign by the inhouse Cinemaware art team for release on the Amiga, then ported to the Apple IIGS, Atari ST, MS-DOS, and X68000. The Mac version was published by Mindscape and later versions for US platforms published by Cinemaware itself. Distribution in the UK, including platforms found almost exclusively there and in Europe, was done by Mirrorsoft.

In July, 2012, Cinemaware announced they were planning to release an iOS emulated version of the Amiga edition of The King of Chicago. As of 2013 the game has been released on the app store.

== Reception ==
Macworld reviewed the Macintosh version of The King of Chicago, praising its attempt to bridge the gap between movies and video games, stating that "The King of Chicago delivers a game that comes one step closer to the computer entertainment dream: a real-time movie controlled by the user." Macworld praises The King of Chicago's gameplay and graphics, calling the claymation graphics "innovative" and gameplay "consistently entertaining", furthermore stating that "Everything is handled with self-parodying wit and interchanges between characters are terrifically funny. I've never had so much fun playing a computer game." Macworld heavily criticized the lack of a save feature, calling it "appalling that a game that takes hours to complete won't let you save", and although characters behave differently in different playthroughs, Macworld expressed that the game suffers from "eventual repetitiveness", saying that "eventually you find yourself watching some scenes again and again."
