= Speedy Blupi =

1998 video game

- Developer: EPSITEC
- Publisher: eGames
- Platform: Windows
- Release: 1998
- Genre: Platformer
- Modes: Single-player, multiplayer

Speedy Blupi (Speedy Eggbert in the United States), is a video game for Windows based PCs developed by EPSITEC, and released in 1998, as an independent title. It is part of the Blupi series, and the successor to Planet Blupi.

A sequel, Speedy Blupi II, was also released, and renamed by eGames to Speedy Eggbert 2. Speedy Blupi has been released as freeware by EPSITEC, and is available at blupi.org, Planet Blupi was released Open-source under GPLv3 on GitHub in 2017.

== Gameplay ==
The whole game is centered on a central hub, in which the player character Blupi (alias Eggbert) can access all of the game's seven themed worlds to embark on challenging treasure hunting quests within these worlds that are rigged and bomb-planted by other multi-colored Blupis who are keeping each hub world locked and guarded. At first, he can only go to the practice level, where he will learn most of the controls listed above. The rest of the controls are not shown to during the practice game; they are left for the player to discover these moves while passing through the levels.

The game has over forty levels, ranging from easy to relatively difficult. The objective of each level is to collect all the treasure chests and then move to the endpoint. The game includes enemies which Blupi cannot destroy normally, but can be destroyed using the Helicopter, the Glue Tank and self-placed yellow mines.

The Jeep and Skateboard allow Blupi to destroy all kinds of mines them without losing a life. Glue balls can be collected by Blupi, where they can be fired as weapons from the Glue Tank or Helicopter to defeat enemies. There are also deductive problems to be solved and errors may make finishing the level impossible (by for example, accidentally destroying all helicopters available).

=== Level editor ===
Players can create up to 20 custom missions on their account, for a total of 160 custom missions across all players. They can use all the objects, enemies, and vehicles to make their levels. However, they cannot make the large keys and doors on single player mode. The custom missions in game can be saved to the C:/User directory as .XCH files, which can later be loaded to import older missions.

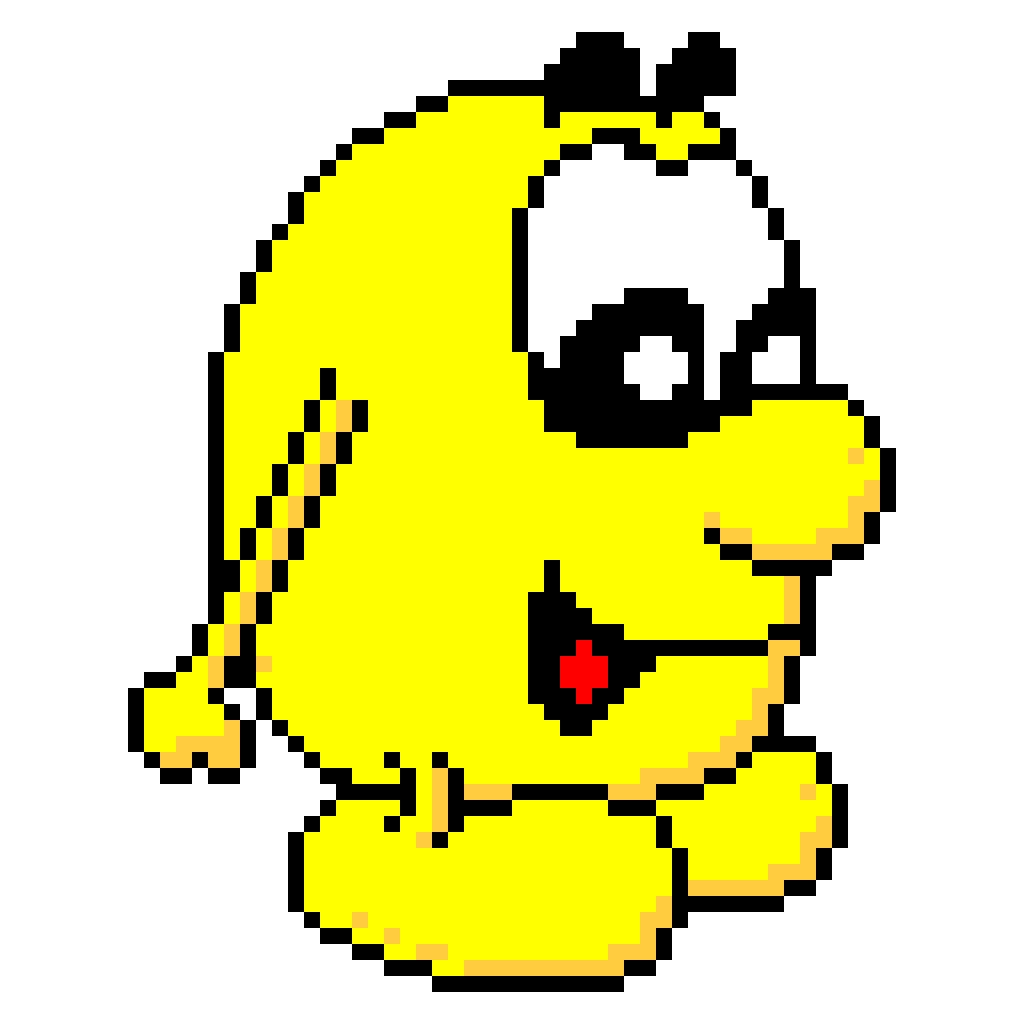
Eggbert (from the game Blupimania)

== Release and distribution ==
Speedy Blupi was originally developed and published by EPSITEC in Switzerland. In North America, the game was published by eGames under the title Speedy Eggbert. The game was also featured in the CD-ROM game package Arcade Classics, which featured other eGames titles, such as DemonStar and Crazy Drake.

== Character overview ==
Eggbert/Blupi (originally created as Blup, and also known as Toto in early releases) is a yellow, oval-shaped character created by Swiss developer Daniel Roux. The character first appeared in a comic titled La guerre des Blup in the 1970s and later became the mascot of Smaky computer systems. Blupi subsequently became the protagonist of multiple video games released from the late 1980s onward across several platforms and regions. The franchise has seen continued releases in the 2020s, including new entries for Windows, web platforms, Android and Game Boy Color.

== Legacy ==
=== Speedy Eggbert 2 ===
Among the changes noticeable in the sequel are the addition of keys and lock barriers, teleporters, special barriers that only open when a specified number of treasure boxes have been collected, new enemies for Eggbert to defeat, and the addition of new themes, such as slime, cavern, cheese, and palace. A new vehicle, the hovercraft, is introduced in Speedy Blupi II. The player is also still allowed to create their own levels.

=== Wild Wheels ===
Eggbert also appears as a robot in the "Taxi 1" game, consisting of various missions and races, all to be accomplished by a remote-controlled car. There, he is one of three robots to be taken to their work stations in as short a time as possible and with as little damage as possible to the taxi. In another, a number of Eggberts, undergoing torture, have to be rescued before their execution.

=== Mobile release ===
A Windows Phone version of Speedy Blupi was released in 2013 on the Windows Phone Store.
