= S.D.I. (video game) =

1986 video game

- Developer: Master Designer Software
- Publisher: Cinemaware
- Designer: Robert Jacob
- Engine: Custom
- Platforms: Amiga, Atari ST, MS-DOS, Macintosh
- Release: 1986/1987
- Genre: Action-adventure
- Mode: Single-player

S.D.I. is a 1986 action-adventure game developed and published by Cinemaware. The game is set in the then-future year of 2017. In this fictional timeline, both sides have somehow managed to construct space-based anti-missile defense systems.

== Gameplay ==
Atari ST screenshot

The player takes the role of the commander-in-chief of the American SDI system, Captain Sloan McCormick. McCormick has his headquarters on an American military space station, which commands and controls a network of twelve anti-missile satellites in geosynchronous orbit over the United States. The game's advertising blurb indicates that these American satellites employ particle beams. The Soviets have a similar system also controlled by a space station.

Soviet insurrectionists, led by discontented members of the KGB have gained control of several ICBMs, as well as space launch facilities capable of deploying crewed orbital fighters. They receive no response to their demands for the Kremlin to surrender and for the Americans to abandon their SDI system, so they begin using their seized assets to periodically launch fighters against both space stations and firing waves of nuclear missiles at the United States. The player engages the enemy projectiles and enemy ships using a space-based fighter. The player must destroy the incoming missiles lest they wreak destruction upon the U.S. The player must also make repairs to the defense satellites that become damaged during the battles.

Later in the game, McCormick must make a desperate attempt to rescue his lover, the Soviet station commander, Natalia "Talia" Kazarian. She is placed in grave danger because her station is eventually boarded by the enemy forces, so McCormack must attempt to fight his way past them and reach Kazarian before she is killed. She does not have to be saved to win the game.

== Plot ==
This game was released near the end of the Cold War. According to the game introduction screen, it takes place in October 2017. The game uses the controversial Strategic Defense Initiative (S.D.I.) as its plot device. True to its name, Cinemaware also looked to Hollywood for some inspiration of the storyline. The storyline is reminiscent of several spy films (such as the 007 films From Russia with Love and Moonraker). The game assumes that both the Soviet Union and the United States have their own version of S.D.I. protecting their respective nations. The American station is never referred to by name, but the manual and the in-game text indicate that the Soviet facility is called V. I. Lenin Defense Station. It is also mentioned that the Soviet station has laser cannons for defense against fighters.

== Reception ==
Antic stated that S.D.I. for the Atari ST was "only partially successful". Comparing portions to Star Raiders and Missile Command, the magazine stated that it "is a series of old arcade games strung together [without] depth", criticizing the "fairly repetitious" gameplay and "inconsistent" joystick controls. The reviewer concluded, however, asking "why do I find myself playing it again and again? I don't know, but once I get into it, it holds a bizarre fascination as few other games do. And if that's not a recommendation, I don't know what is". Computer Gaming World praised the ST version, particularly for its touching ending sequences. The review also noted the game "relies more on arcade elements than the other Cinemaware games". Compute! praised the Atari ST version's graphics but called the gameplay repetitive. The Amiga version of the arcade game was reviewed in 1987 in Dragon #128 by Hartley, Patricia, and Kirk Lesser in "The Role of Computers" column. The reviewers gave the game 3 out of 5 stars.
