= Batman Returns (Sega video games) =

- European Mega Drive cover
- Developers: Aspect (Game Gear, Master System); Malibu Interactive (Genesis, Sega CD)
- Publisher: Sega
- Composers: Motohiro Kawashima (Game Gear, Master System)
- Series: Batman
- Platforms: Game Gear, Master System, Genesis/Mega Drive, Sega CD
- Release: September 1992: Game Gear; NA: September 1992; JP: October 23, 1992; Genesis/Mega Drive; NA: October 1992; EU: December 10, 1992; JP: February 19, 1993; Master System; EU: March 1993; Sega CD; NA: 1993; EU: August 1993
- Genres: Action, platform Vehicular combat (Sega CD only)
- Mode: Single-player

Batman Returns is the name of several video games for various platforms based on the 1992 film of the same name.

The Sega console versions (i.e. Sega Genesis, Sega CD, Master System and Game Gear) were published by Sega.

== Genesis/Sega CD ==
The Sega Genesis version of the game is a two-dimensional platforming game similar in design to Sunsoft's 1990 game based on the 1989 Batman film. The Genesis version of the game was released on December 29, 1992. The Sega CD version is an expanded version of the Genesis game, and adds a number of 3D racing levels that took advantage of the graphics hardware provided by the Sega CD unit, plus improved music in the form of CD audio with a number of animations featuring original artwork instead of still photos. Both versions feature a plot based on the events of the movie starting after The Penguin kills the Ice Princess and frames Batman for the murder, as shown in the game's introductions.

== Master System/Game Gear ==
The Master System and Game Gear versions of the game are essentially identical side-scrolling platform games, but the titles were created independently of the 16-bit versions and share no design elements. This version featured a unique branched level system, allowing players to choose from an easy and difficult route. The latter typically forced players to use rope swinging to navigate over large floorless areas. The music was composed by Motohiro Kawashima under the supervision of Yuzo Koshiro, and was one of his first soundtracks for a game; he utilized Music Macro Language to program the music, with assistance from Koshiro.

== Reception ==
Reception

Review scores
Publication	Score
Electronic Gaming Monthly	21/40 (Sega CD)
GamePro	16.5/20 (Game Gear); 15.5/20 (Genesis); 13.5/20 (Sega CD)
MegaTech	94%
Sega Master Force	54%
Entertainment Weekly	A

Awards
Publication	Award
MegaTech	Hyper Game
Electronic Gaming Monthly	Best Licensed Game of 1992

In his review of the Genesis version, Boy Blunder of GamePro described the controls as "a tad cumbersome at first, but playable after practice", and felt that they were "a step down from Sunsoft's cart". He remarked that the visuals were "too muted to win an award", though said that the backgrounds were "well-drawn" and admired the occasional effects, particularly the "bizarre diagonal scrolling in Act I's cutaway building". He was apathetic toward the music and had a mixed response to the sound effects, explaining that "some of the effects, such as the thunderstorm, are hot, but others are not. The death bleep for the enemies is particularly grating".

Sister Sinister appreciated the Game Gear version's "wonderfully elaborate and colorful" graphics and varied soundtrack, though noted that Batman is "small and a little hard on the eyes".

The Sega CD version received middling reviews. The Tummynator of GamePro described the graphics as "unimpressive", elaborating that the backgrounds and sprites were colored with similar dark palettes, which made the game "muddy and hard to see". He further described the music as "average Bat bebop" and the sound effects as "below CD quality", and said that the three Batmobile-centered levels were the only bonus for those who have already played the Genesis version. The reviewers of Electronic Gaming Monthly commended the Sega CD version's driving levels and soundtrack, but derided the side-scrolling sections as weak. The Mega-CD version was a bestseller in the UK.

Entertainment Weekly gave the game an A and wrote: "Forget about the tortured dualities of good and evil – this is a rousing, jump and-shoot-action game, whose main links with the movie are in its dark backgrounds and Tim Burton-inspired character design".

The 1992 titles together were awarded Best License of the Year by Electronic Gaming Monthly.
