= Walt Disney Studios =

Walt Disney Studios may refer to:

- Walt Disney Studios (division), the Walt Disney Company's primary entertainment unit consisting of its film studio divisions, music labels, theatrical production and distribution companies
- Walt Disney Studios (Burbank), a film studio and business complex in Burbank, California, United States built in 1939 and as the corporate headquarters for the Walt Disney Company
- Walt Disney Studio (1926–1929), the second name of the Walt Disney Company
- Walt Disney Animation Studios, the main animation division of the Walt Disney Company
- Walt Disney Studios Motion Pictures, the primary theatrical film distributor of the Walt Disney Company who releases films released under the Walt Disney Pictures label
- Walt Disney Studios Home Entertainment, the primary home video media distributor of the Walt Disney Company
- Walt Disney Television Studios, the former incarnation of Disney Television Studios, the television studios arm of the Walt Disney Company
- Walt Disney Studios Park, a theme park located in Disneyland Paris in Marne-la-Vallée, France

== See also ==
- Disney Interactive Studios, former video game studio
- Disney's Hollywood Studios, a theme park at the Walt Disney World Resort in Lake Buena Vista, Florida
