= Disney Television =

Disney Television may refer to:

- Disney Television Studios, the television studios arm of The Walt Disney Company
- Disney Television Animation, the animation studio division of Disney tasked with television production
- Disney Branded Television, now Disney Kids & Family, a division of Disney that makes productions for distribution on its television and digital platforms
- Walt Disney Television, the original television sector from 1983 to 2003
- Disney Entertainment Television, which also carried the name Walt Disney Television from 2019 to 2021
