= RomTech =

Software company based in Pennsylvania

RomTech was a software company based in Langhorne Borough, Pennsylvania. The company released CD-ROM collections of clip art, games, and small office/home office (SOHO) applications sold at retail stores such as Walmart and Target. The company was founded in 1992.

In December 1996, RomTech's Galaxy of Games bundle was the #1 bestselling software at a number of major retail outlets.

== History ==
RomTech made an initial public offering in 1995, at the same time as acquiring Applied Optical Media Corporation. It then acquired Virtual Reality Laboratories in April 1996. On March 1, 1999 Romtech changed its name to eGames and announced a new focus of developing PC titles.

== CD-ROM titles ==
RomTech released a number of retail titles on CD-ROM

Name	Platform	Description
Galaxy of Games	Win 98 / Win.95 / Win. 3.1	Curated bundle of games
Mars Rover		Simulation software created in RomTech's VistaPro that used real images from NASA
FileABC		PC imaging and document solution
FormWizard		Software for scanning or importing documents to complete electronically and later print or fax
Exploring Civilizations	Win.95 / Win. 3.1	Education software allowing players to explore ancient civilizations with Professor Diggs
VistaPro 4.0	Win95 / NT	Landscape rendering software

=== Other software ===
Name	Platform
Galaxy of Home Office Help: Print It!	Win.95 / Win. 3.1
Amazing Mazes	
Clipart 50,000	Win.95 / Win. 3.1
PrintIt! 2.0 Plus	Win.95 / Win. 3.1
Fonts 2,600	Win.95 / Win. 3.1
Presentation Pictures & Sounds	Win.95 / Win. 3.1
Custom Calendar	Win.95
FindIt!	Win.95 / NT
Student Essentials	Win.95
Galaxy of Clipart, 75,000 images	Win.95 / Win. 3.1
PrintIt! 2.0	Win.95 / Win. 3.1
Fonts 2,600	Win.95 / Win. 3.1
Clipart 25,000	Win.95 / Win. 3.1
Presentation Pictures	Win.95 / Win. 3.1
Wav Sound Effects	Win.95 / Win. 3.1
Icons 8,000	Win.95 / Win. 3.1
Custom Calendar	Win.95
Clipart 25,000 Vol II	Win.95 / Win. 98
Christian Desktop	Win.95 / Win. 98
Universe Explorer	Win.95 / Win. 3.1
