= Crazy Drake =

1996 video game

- Developer: Neurotech Software
- Publishers: One Reality eGames
- Platform: MS-DOS
- Release: 1996
- Genre: Platform
- Mode: Single-player

Crazy Drake is a platform game released for MS-DOS in 1996. The protagonist of the game is a duck named Prince Drake, whose mission is to rescue a golden egg from Dr. Foulbrain, an evil scientist.

== Plot ==
Title screen

Gameplay follows the character Prince Drake, the son of King Drake and Queen Drake of Loonville (Ducktropolis in the eGames version). After the antagonist, Dr. Foulbrain steals a relic named the Sacred Golden Egg, Prince Drake (disguised as his alter ego Crazy Drake) confronts Dr. Foulbrain to recover the egg.

== Gameplay ==
There are six worlds in Crazy Drake (plus one bonus hidden level if all are completed). Each world (excluding the hidden level) has 3 levels each, featuring its own set of enemies and its own theme.

- Each level one ends with a boss related to level's theme, for example aliens for Sci-Fi Space.
- Each level two is set in midair and ends with Crazy Drake entering an elevator.
- Each level three ends with the appearance of Dr. Foulbrain.

== Legacy ==
A new version of the game, made by eGames, was released in 2000. It was included in the CD-ROM game package Arcade Classics, with other eGames titles such as Speedy Eggbert, and Demonstar.
