= Greatest Heavyweights =

1993 video game

- North American cover art
- Developer: Acme Interactive
- Publisher: Sega
- Platform: Sega Genesis
- Release: NA: December 1993; EU: January 21, 1994; JP: May 27, 1994
- Genre: Sports
- Modes: Single-player, multiplayer

Greatest Heavyweights is a boxing video game that was published by Sega in 1993 for the Sega Genesis console. It is a follow-up to Evander Holyfield's Real Deal Boxing and is virtually identical in many ways, apart from a number of significant improvements.

== Overview ==
The game features eight of the most famous and successful heavyweight boxers in history: Muhammad Ali, Jack Dempsey, Joe Frazier, Larry Holmes, Evander Holyfield, Joe Louis, Rocky Marciano, and Floyd Patterson. There are also a total of thirty other imaginary fighters present in the game. The cartridge supports the six-button control pad (an improvement over the controller options of its predecessor).

== Gameplay ==
Evander Holyfield is trying to defend some blows to the torso given out by Rocky Marciano.

The gameplay of the game is very similar to that featured in Evander Holyfield's Real Deal Boxing. Perhaps the most noticeable improvement is the speed of the game; it is significantly faster than the aforementioned title. The "taunting" feature is also improved; the phrases used are now more varied, because each of the boxers based on real-life fighters have their own set of taunts. Some of them reflect utterances actually spoken by them during their careers. Boxers will now also sometimes taunt their opponents before fights as well as during them.

The game uses an identical 'attributes' system for each boxer to Evander Holyfield's Real Deal Boxing, apart from one change: the attribute "defense" is no longer present. As with Evander Holyfield in the previously mentioned game, the eight real-life fighters have maximum values on all of the attributes featured.

Career mode is slightly altered, in that the player fights their way through the thirty imaginary boxers in the game, with the last of these fights being for the World Heavyweight Title. After the player has won the title, they then fight all eight of the pugilists based on real-life boxers, in 'challenge' matches. Also, when creating a fighter, it is no longer possible to alter whether the boxer is left or right-handed. Instead, it is now possible to choose the physical size of your boxer from three pre-sets. An improvement over Evander Holyfield's Real Deal Boxing is that the player now has many more colors to choose from when determining skin and hair colour for their fighter. If they so wish, they can have boxers that are wildly unrealistic colours such as bright blue or green. There are also more colors to choose from when adjusting the color of a fighter's shorts.

There is one new mode: tournament. In this mode, a player takes control of one of the eight real-life boxers in the game, and competes against the other seven in an eight-man tournament. In any of the three modes, the player can choose to have their fighter on either the left or right side of the screen.

The real-life boxers featured in the game reflect the fighters they are based upon in the way the console controls them. For example, Muhammad Ali dances about the ring, throwing many quick, straight punches, whereas Rocky Marciano constantly moves forward, throwing heavier punches such as hooks or uppercuts.

== Reception ==
Allgame gave the game a score of 4.5 stars out of a possible 5 in their overview. Game Players gave it a score of 56% in their February 1994 issue.
