= The Three Stooges (video game) =

1987 video game

- Box art. The Evil Banker is modeled after Ted Healy.
- Developer: Incredible Technologies
- Publisher: Cinemaware
- Platforms: Amiga, Apple IIGS, Commodore 64, NES, Game Boy Advance, PlayStation, MS-DOS, Windows, Macintosh
- Release: NA: 1987
- Genre: Adventure video game

The Three Stooges is a video game released by Cinemaware in 1987 for the Amiga based on the comedy trio of the same name. Players control Stooges Moe, Larry, and Curly in minigames based on Stooges films with the aim of raising enough money to save an orphanage. It was ported to the Apple IIGS, Commodore 64, MS-DOS, NES and Game Boy Advance. The game has been praised as a faithful adaptation of the Stooges films, but has been criticized for repetitive gameplay and limited replay value.

A remake was released for Microsoft Windows and Macintosh.

== Gameplay ==
Players must select a minigame to complete for each in-game day.

John Cutter designed the game as a kind of board game. The Three Stooges must rescue an old woman's orphanage by earning money in minigames based on various Three Stooges films. These include cracker-eating contests (based on the Stooges short Dutiful But Dumb), boxing matches (based on the short Punch Drunks). and hospital go-cart races (based on the short Men in Black). Players select minigames by timing a button press as a hand randomly points to various symbols representing in-game events, including non-interactive events that can raise or lower the Stooges' cash total. Each event takes up one in-game day; players have 30 in-game days to earn as much money as possible.

The hand gradually speeds up from one day to the next but can be slowed down by landing on a space that allows Moe to pummel Larry and Curly. The player must avoid mousetrap spaces, which injure the fingers on the hand; landing on four such spaces immediately end the game, regardless of the number of days completed.

Several different game endings are possible, depending on the amount of money the player has earned. These range from the banker foreclosing on the orphanage due to the Stooges' inability to collect enough money to pay the rent, to the orphanage being saved and renovated and the Stooges marrying the owner's three daughters.

== Ports and related releases ==
The game was later ported to the NES, developed by Beam Software and published by Activision. Cinemaware directly released a port for the Apple IIGS in 1990. Versions for the Game Boy Advance (developed by Crawfish Interactive) and PlayStation (developed by Flying Tiger) were published by Metro3D, Inc. and released in 2002. The game was also updated for release on Microsoft Windows and Apple Macintosh as one of Cinemaware's "Digitally Remastered" editions.

== Reception ==
The Amiga version of the game received mixed reviews, with the game's graphics and digital voices receiving most of the praise. Mark Patterson of Commodore User gave the game an 8 out of 10, citing positive impressions of the game's humor, writing that the game was "probably the only game that has intentionally set out to make people laugh, and worked." Computer Gaming World wrote that the Amiga and Commodore 64 versions "captured the Three Stooges magic", stating that for fans of the trio it was "simultaneously a delight and piece of 'living' memorabilia". Compute! called The Three Stooges "one of the high points of the season", stating that the game "looks like the Stooges, sounds like the Stooges ... and most important, feels like the Stooges". However, Commodore Computing International criticized the game's limited replay value and long loading times. The publication also criticized the game's lack of a "common theme" and called the game "a little disjointed." The Games Machine offered similar criticism, stating that while the game is "a masterpiece in FX and presentation", the gameplay is "disappointingly shallow." Six reviewers in Digital Press gave the NES version 9, 7, 6, 7, 8, and 9 (all out of 10).
