= TRACON (series) =

Air traffic control software

- Cover art for Tracon II
- Genre: Simulation
- Developer: Wesson International
- Publisher: Wesson International
- Platforms: MS-DOS, Classic Mac OS, Amiga, Windows

TRACON is a series of video games that simulate air traffic control. The games were originally sold by Texas-based Wesson International as an offshoot to their line of professional air traffic control simulation products. TRACON and RAPCON were released in 1989, and TRACON II was released in 1990. Both were met with critical acclaim. Wesson was merged into Adacel in 2001.

== Gameplay ==
The games include graphics that simulate TRACON air traffic control situations. At periodic screen updates, aircraft icons move slowly across the controller's sector. The player sees an aircraft icon with its identifier and the aircraft's altitude or flight level.

The game familiarizes a player with the difficulty of tracking many events simultaneously. Every aircraft is moving in a dynamic environment. The player must contend with the representation of three-dimensional space in two dimensions on the screen. Generally, aircraft must be kept separated by 1,000 vertical feet and three miles horizontal separation. A series of alarms sound if adequate space between aircraft is not maintained. A few separation conflicts can quickly wipe out the player's entire accrued point value. The closer aircraft get, the more severe the warnings. A mid-air crash ends the game.

There are two ways to run ATC simulation scenarios: a) random scenarios created by the program itself, or b) player created scenarios which may be edited with a simple text editor (file extension *.sim), following all the syntax rules and geographical sector details .

In case (a) the player selects traffic density to control (aircraft / time) and one from the available geographical sectors and then the game issues random start and end points within this sector at random altitudes and activation times. It juggles aircraft types, some being commercial airline traffic while others are slow-moving general aviation aircraft. Each game sees a different mix of aircraft, callsigns, start- and end-points, unless the user elects to "repeat the last simulation." Aircraft types have profiles: an airliner might cruise at 250 knots while general aviation craft may cruise as slowly as 90 knots. The player can slow an airliner to 170 knots in order to space aircraft in an approach pattern. If the aircraft is ordered to fly below its minimum speed, the game says, "That's below my minimum." Aircraft identify as heavy where appropriate. Flight plans can either transit a sector or involve takeoffs and landings. Users receive point credit for successfully getting aircraft through their respective flight plans. Points are continually deducted for each command issued to a pilot and for time delays. Shorter flights mean higher point counts. Each turn or change in speed the player orders costs points.

Aircraft arriving at the edge of the player's TRACON will call. "AA34 with you at one one thousand," the status line will display this in text, voice of the calling pilot will play, and the icon will persistently flash. If ignored, the aircraft will circle and hold at the radio fix identified as the beginning-point in the player's sector.

In case (b) the player selects his own simulation (*.sim) file to run and the scenario unfolds exactly as described by the designer. In this case the possibilities to use TRACON II as a more realistic ATC simulator are many, adding to it the fact that a user may also design his entirely own airspace-sectors (file extension *.sec) to work with. Thus a large number of fans all over the world appeared offering sectors and simulation files well beyond the standard ones coming with this package. There are of course some limitations. The maximum altitude one may use is restricted by the maximum binary number (8bit) used in this program to below 31000 feet which, however, is enough for Terminal Area Control, although insufficient for higher airspaces. The aircraft performance can be varied but not with all necessary parameters, although still almost realistic for aircraft approaching - departing aerodromes at below 10000 feet. The sector creation needs careful design for its syntax but it is otherwise simple. The positioning on points demands a conversion of geographical coordinates to a X,Y grid centered on a point selected by the user which is allocated the 0,0 coordinates.

Plenty of explanations for the syntax and files details were provided with the initial version.

== MS-DOS ==
Version 1.5 of the software was shipped on three 5.25-inch, 360K floppy disks. It ran on an 8088-based PC with a single 5.25-inch floppy disk drive, DOS 2, 256KB RAM, and an EGA or 640x480 VGA display. This version would also run on a Hercules-type monochrome 720x348 graphics card. A series of submenus allowed configuration changes to the game. A running dialog appeared in text near the bottom of the screen. Changes to aircraft status were displayed by standardized text phrases such as "AA34 is landing."

Simulated paper strips allowed the player to see pending flight plans and aircraft within their sector. Just before an aircraft called to make a first request, their paper strip would appear on the screen. It showed their requested altitude, aircraft type, start and end points. After an aircraft was handed off to an approach or another sector, its paper strip would disappear.

To vary the difficulty of the game, users could choose crosswind directions and speeds, whether pilots were talented or sometimes missed instructions, and how many aircraft were present over what length of time. The system randomized the aircraft behavior. Sometimes, four aircraft would call within seconds, requesting the player's attention. Other times the player would have time to concentrate on getting an aircraft cleanly handed off to a tower for an approach.

Time is a central mechanic. If a player ignored an aircraft's request to take off, the aircraft could eventually run out of fuel. The game could be paused, but with a cost of thousands of deducted points. The game documentation suggested that real air traffic could not be paused.

Colors were adjustable and changed based on the aircraft's status. For example, the icon of an aircraft requesting to enter the controller's sector would flash as it approached. This indicated the pilot was calling, requesting to enter sector airspace. The text at the bottom of the display might read, "AA34 (American thirty four) with you at one one thousand." An option for voice, which came out of the PCs speaker (no sound card required), was available. Sound was a resource hog: while sounds played, the rest of the PC's functions froze. If sound was turned off, the PC speaker would chirp to alert the player that a new aircraft request was in their queue. Sounds could be set to off, play aircraft calls only, or play aircraft and controllers. In the latter, the game simulates the voice radio calls a player would speak to vector aircraft in the simulation.

The game shipped with three sectors: San Francisco, Boston, and Los Angeles. These are simplified but spatially accurate models of regions. Wesson sold additional packs of sectors simulating other parts of the US.

In the game, aircraft with a flight plan involving a landing must be vectored to a proper altitude at the start of the approach pattern. For example, if the approach started at 1,700 feet on a heading of 170 degrees, the player needed to get the aircraft near that altitude and heading. At that point, the aircraft is handed off to the approach controller. The aircraft responds, "AA34 switching to tower frequency." This changes the aircraft's icon to flash in a different color. If successful, the icon would change to, "AA34 is landing." Its altitude display would tick downward until it disappeared off the radar. Failure to get the aircraft lined up at a reasonable altitude got the response, "AA34 executing missed approach." The player would have to vector the aircraft back around into the approach pattern.

Mid-air crashes end the game and pop a dialog box with one of a group of several messages. Most messages tell the player their employment is terminated. One says the player can apply for the job of custodian. Another suggests the player pick up the pieces of their life.

An external text file allows many of the internal program settings to be adjusted.

A cassette tape was included with the program. It provided an audio track for a demonstration scenario taking place in the Los Angeles Sector.

== RAPCON ==
At the same time with TRACON 1.5, another version appeared that simulated in particular the military precision approach phase from the same producer and with the same file and simulation syntax, under the title RAPCON . This version, remained the unique ever PC simulator for this type of approach known as well under the term GCA for Ground Control Approach. Although it starts as a normal Terminal Area Control, at the moment a flight is put on its final track, by pressing the F2 key, the aircraft was transferred to the GCA position and the screen was changed to the equivalent Precision Approach Radar one, while the rest of the traffic was actually 'frozen', meaning that you could continue control this single aircraft and after landing, you could then move over to the previous Terminal Area Control to keep on with the rest of the traffic that had stayed at the moment you moved to the GCA position. All the commands for this particular type of control were available additionally to the standard ones for TRACON.

== Windows ==
In addition to more sector charts, sound is more seamless than in MS-DOS versions. It was easy to turn on sound without being distracted by the game freezing as each sound played.

Another addition was the existence of VFR general aviation pilots in simulations. In many simulations, a number of VFR icons criss-cross the screen. Occasionally, one would call, "Cherokee five five zulu with you at three thousand five hundred." The player would have to ask the VFR pilot to squawk their transponder, making the VFR craft's icon bloom on the screen. This separated the calling aircraft's icon from other identical VFR icons on the screen. Within a short time frame, the player had to attach the correct ident (55Z) to the VFR aircraft. The squawked icon would only bloom for a few seconds. If too much time passed, the player had to repeat the request and try again. It becomes essential to have the sound working properly if you want to handle this VFR traffic, else it becomes necessary to scroll up/down your dialogue window to see the calls made by any VFR entering so that you may call them with their proper call sign or you can not identify them and consequently control them.

In this TRACON for Windows version, the player is given the option to work in TRACON or RAPCON but under RAPCON we simply see a classic Terminal Area Control over some military sectors, without any apparent possibility of reverting to the Precision Approach Radar position.

== Reception ==
M. Evan Brooks reviewed the game for Computer Gaming World, and stated that "this reviewer's initial impression was muted, in that the simulation appeared to be too much simulation and not enough game. However, repeated play has shown that TRACON can be a very enjoyable pastime. It is definitely not for the arcade set. If one finds intellectual challenge appealing, TRACON is heartily recommended."

In a 1994 survey of wargames Computer Gaming World gave RAPCON three stars out of five, describing it as "detailed ... quite interesting", but for "a narrow market".
