= TV Sports: Football =

1988 video game

- Developer: Cinemaware
- Publishers: Cinemaware; Mirrorsoft; Victor Entertainment
- Platforms: Amiga, Atari ST, Commodore 64, MS-DOS, TurboGrafx-16
- Release: 1988: Amiga; 1989: ST, MS-DOS; 1990: C64, TurboGrafx-16
- Genre: Sports

TV Sports: Football is an American football video game developed and published by Cinemaware. It was released for the Amiga in 1988, Atari ST and MS-DOS in 1989, and Commodore 64 and TurboGrafx-16 in 1990.

== Gameplay ==
TV Sports: Football is the first in a series of sports video games which feature athletic action styled as on television.

== Reception ==
Wyatt Lee and J. D. Lambright reviewed the game for Computer Gaming World, and wrote that "action game fans who want a difficult game may not like this game as well as a strict arcade game like John Elway's Quarterback, but players who want to capture the atmosphere, flow of play, and fast-moving competition of professional football should love it".

In the November 1989 edition of the British magazine Games International (issue 10), Ernesto Williams was not familiar with the American sport of football, but was able to learn about it through this video game. Although he liked most of the game, including the graphics and audio, he did not admire the appearance of sports announcers from time to time, and pointed out "mercifully this window dressing can be skipped in most cases, speeding up play considerably". He also noted that the incessant disk swapping slowed the game considerably. He concluded by giving both the game and its graphics above-average ratings of 4 out of 5, saying: "Simple but subtle, American Football is a game that needs time to fully appreciate".

Matt Taylor reviewed the game for Computer Gaming World, and said that "despite the scattered flags on the play, as a multi-player game the call on TV Sports Football with this official is: 'The kick is up... It's long enough... It's good!'"

In 1996, Computer Gaming World declared TV Sports: Football the 112th-best computer game ever released.
