= Sky Mission =

1992 video game

- Japanese cover art
- Developer: Malibu Interactive
- Publisher: Namco
- Producer: Ken Lobb
- Programmer: Steve Hughes
- Artists: Jeremy Cantor; Steve Thomson
- Composers: George Sanger; Joe McDermott; David Govett; Kevin Phelan
- Platform: Super Nintendo Entertainment System
- Release: JP: September 29, 1992; NA: October 1992; EU: January 21, 1993
- Genre: Combat flight simulation
- Mode: Single-player

Sky Mission (Note: Japanese: スカイミッション, Hepburn: Sukaimisshon) is a 1992 combat flight simulation video game developed by Malibu Interactive and published by Namco for the Super Nintendo Entertainment System. In North America, the game was rebranded as the sequel to the Commodore Amiga game Wings, which was developed by the developer's predecessor Cinemaware, titled Wings 2: Aces High, while in Europe it was renamed to Blazing Skies. As the leader of a British plane squadron during World War I, the player is tasked with destroying enemy planes under the command of German emperor Kaiser Wilhelm II in France. Gameplay involves gunning down enemies and performing bombing runs on enemy bases. The game was produced by Ken Lobb, best known as the co-creator of the Killer Instinct fighting game series, with music composed by musician George Sanger. Sky Mission was met with a mixed reaction from critics — although it was disliked for its short length and lacking gameplay, it was praised for its realistic visuals, soundtrack and sense of thrill.

== Gameplay ==
The player engaged in a dogfight with an enemy plane.

As the leader of a squadron of British warplanes, the player must bomb German buildings viable to Kaiser Wilhelm II's war effort while over the fields of France.

Five different pilots are given this difficult task; obtaining status points to improve their performance in combat. If any of these pilots fails to complete their appointed mission but survives the actual combat, the pilot will suffer demotion. If failure to complete missions (while surviving) persists, the eventual result will be a dishonorable discharge from the military. If he dies in the line of duty, then the player gets a cemetery scene with the game taking place in the year 1917, with applicable medals earned displayed by the fighter's portrait.

In standard (non-bombing) flight missions, the player must use guns to blast down German biplanes. Eventually, the player will get to face off with the Red Baron (famed World War I fighter ace Manfred von Richthofen). There is also a cheat code for radar which, unusually, was included in a small section of the manual. In real life, radar was not operationally employed as a means to seek out enemy aircraft until World War II. The game is controlled using controls that are friendly to most arcade players and a password system can be used for advanced players to gain the ability to join the conflict during any stage.

== Development ==
Wings 2: Aces High is based on Japanese title Sky Mission. The Wings branding was only added to the game's US release, with the European version going under the name Blazing Skies. The title was superficially similar to the original game, with dogfighting and bombing missions, but was presented in more of an arcade format whereby the player was sent back and forced to complete failed missions - in Wings, by contrast, the narrative continues whether missions are passed or failed and even when the player pilot is killed the game continues with another.

The instruction manual has been illustrated with numerous photographs from the era, donated by the San Diego Aerospace Museum along with the explanation about the origins of World War I.

== Reception ==
Reception

Aggregate score
Aggregator	Score
GameRankings	70%

Review scores
Publication	Score
Famitsu	24/40
GamePro	3.5/5
Super Famicom Magazine	19.36/40
N-Force	77/100

Sky Mission was met with a mixed response from critics — although it was often criticized for its short length and lacking gameplay, it was praised for its impressive graphics, soundtrack and sense of thrill. It holds a 70% score on video game aggregator website GameRankings.

Japanese publication Famitsu found the game to lack the freedom that other combat flight simulation games have, while Family Computer Magazine criticized its controls for being awkward. Famitsu also criticized its gameplay for being too simplistic and its shooting mechanics monotonous. N-Force magazine stated that the game was too short and lacking in gameplay, only recommending it to fans of the flight-sim genre. German magazine Power Play was much more negative towards the game, mockingly commenting that its variety could only be seen "with a pair of binoculars", while also criticizing its high difficulty and short length. GamePro claimed that the enemy planes cheated through unrealistic movements that were impossible for planes at the time, while also disliking the music for drowning out sound effects.

Famitsu was impressed with the game's graphics and soundtrack, saying that it created a true illusion of soaring through the skies. They also liked the game's overall sense of thrill and cinematic presentation. A similar response was echoed by Super Famicom Magazine, who applauded its Mode 7 3D effects and realistic visuals. GamePro claimed that the game was "some pilot's dream come true" with its immersive 3D visuals and music, while also praising its hectic dog-fight missions and overall thrill. Power Play found the game to be visually impressive, complementing its 3D visuals and realistic graphics. SNES Force listed it among the ten best strategy console games of 1993, briefly noting of its realistic dog fighting scenarios and World War I setting.
