= Evander Holyfield's Real Deal Boxing =

1992 video game

Evander Holyfield's "Real Deal" True Boxing
- Packaging for the European Mega Drive version.
- Developers: Acme Interactive (GEN); Novotrade International (GG)
- Publisher: Sega
- Platforms: Mega Drive/Genesis, Game Gear
- Release: NA: August 1992; EU: September 24, 1992; JP: October 30, 1992
- Genre: Traditional boxing simulation
- Modes: Single-player multiplayer

Evander Holyfield's "Real Deal" Boxing is a boxing video game that was developed by Acme Interactive and published by Sega in 1992, released for the Mega Drive/Genesis and Game Gear consoles. It was followed by a sequel in 1993, Greatest Heavyweights, which featured a number of improvements.

== Overview ==
The game features Evander Holyfield, and over 28 imaginary fighters. It uses 2D sprites seen from a side-on view, combined with a top-down map of the ring, to allow boxers to move 360 degrees about the ring. The cartridge utilises battery-backed RAM to save a player's progress.

== Gameplay ==
During a fight, each boxer has an energy meter that decreases whenever they are hit. When the energy meter reaches zero, that player's boxer will suffer a knockdown. The meter is not affected by how much physical activity the boxer engages in (apart from getting punched). In addition, there is a meter for the boxer's head and body, which shows how much damage each of these areas has sustained. When the head or body meters reach zero, that boxer will take much more damage when hit in that area. Regardless of how much damage a boxer receives, punches reduce a fighter's energy bar by a consistent amount (unlike in many boxing games, where punches sometimes vary by how likely they are to knock a boxer down, causing serious damage in the process).

If a boxer has received large amount of damage to either their head or their body, and they continue to be punched in that area, the fight will soon end in a TKO. Large amounts of punishment to the head will also result in visible cuts. A TKO will also result if a boxer is knocked down three times. However, unlike in real-life boxing matches, a boxer can be pummelled for an entire fight without throwing one punch in return, but unless they are knocked down three times, or suffer extreme damage to either their head or body, the fight will be allowed to continue. Similarly, fight judges will not score a round as 10-8 unless a fighter is knocked down. The only exception to this is if the scoring of a round as 10-9 would result in a draw. In such an instance, the round will be scored 10–8 to the fighter who won the round. This system of scoring is unrealistic, because in real boxing matches, a round is sometimes scored 10-8 if one boxer has been badly pummelled. It is also possible for boxers to pause and hurl insults during a fight, such as "come on and fight you wimp!".

=== Career mode ===
In career mode, the player fights their way through the 28 selectable imaginary boxers in the game, with the last of these being against Holyfeld himself, for the World Heavyweight Title. Following the attainment of the title, the player then fights in a number of 'challenge' matches, against high-ranked contenders. Some of these fights include imaginary fighters who were previously unseen in the rankings. After a certain number of fights (usually 20-25) the player's boxer will weaken and it will be increasingly more difficult to keep his attributes at a high level. Once the career of the player's boxer reaches 40 fights, he will have to retire. This prevents gamers from repeatedly fighting the same low-ranked, low-quality boxers in order to receive more training (and thus better attributes, making the game easier) at an early stage of their career. If the player beats Holyfield he will also decline and fall down the rankings until he eventually retires as well. Only resetting the internal memory of the game can bring Holyfield back to his optimum form.

In career mode, the player must create their own boxer; they cannot use any of the game's pre-created boxers. Options to edit are: name, body size, handedness, skin colour and short colour - with selectable colours including: red, green, gold, purple, dark blue, cyan and yellow. An unlockable boxer named "The Beast" (unlocked by entering that as his name) wears silver. Each boxer in the game also has four attributes: power, speed, stamina and defense. These attributes all vary widely between the 30 boxers featured in the game (Evander Holyfield has the maximum rating on all of them). During career mode, all of the attributes can be increased by selecting various training activities, such as free weights sessions or a protein diet. Many of these portray somewhat unusual ways for a fighter to attempt to improve their boxing ability; for example, taking Karate lessons, paying a visit to a health club, or obtaining an iron gum shield.

In exhibition mode, the player can choose to pit any boxer against any other, with the option to make each fighter controlled by either a player or the console.

The game gradually replaces aging or low-ranked boxers (including Holyfield) with new ones as Career Mode progresses.

=== Other boxers ===
The 28 fictional boxers are (at factory default settings):

Rank	Name	Nation
Champ	Evander Holyfield	(United States)
2	Alan Beast	(United States)
3	Razor Robbins	(Republic of Ireland)
4	Ice Ian	(United States)
5	Rob Hemphill	(United States)
6	Hot Rod Nils	(Sweden)
7	Hunk Hughes	(United States)
8	Joe Steinman	(United States)
9	Michael Lamb	(Canada)
10	Jim Kahn	(Chile)
11	Jeff Godfrey	(England)
12	B.J Higgins	(United States)
13	Dane King	(Australia)
14	Dave Stevis	(Scotland)
15	Slo Mo Jones	(United States)
16	Big Bob Jacob	(South Africa)
17	J.D Leforge	(France)
18	Wildman West	(United States)
19	Red Mclane	(Wales)
20	Carl Coolman	(Jamaica)
21	Jim Jo Bone	(United States)
22	E.Z Ray	(United States)
23	Kent Goad	(Netherlands)
24	Pat Grinder	(Canada)
25	Chuck Wayne	(United States)
26	Dynamite Don	(United States)
27	Dick Steptoe	(England)
28	Mick Llonigan	(Republic of Ireland)

== Presentation ==
The visuals of a fight are made up of 2D sprite-based boxers, and a simple 3D rendering of the ring. A small, overhead map of the ring, featuring both fighters' positions, is also visible during fights. Thus, using this as a navigation aide, it is possible to move boxers 360 degrees around the ring. However, the boxers' lateral movement appears somewhat unusual, due to their sprites being drawn from one side-on point of view.

Digitized speech is used to:

1. Declare a knockout has taken place ("Knockout!").
2. Declare a fight is to be stopped due to medical concerns ("Stop the fight!").
3. To break up fighters who are clinching ("Break").
4. To tell when to start the fight ("Box").

It is also used for the taunts that computer-controlled boxers will sometimes say during a fight. There are also grunts and groans that emphasize the impact of some punches. There are also audible crowd effects; if a boxer lands a damaging punch, the crowd will cheer in approval, whereas if there is a lack of action, they will make evident their disapproval with boos and jeers. As a boxer's rank advances, more spectators appear in the crowd.

== Reception ==
Mean Machines (UK) awarded the Mega Drive version 52%, saying: "Some good ideas and some impressive graphics ruined by awful gameplay and in-game logic." Glenn Rubenstein of Wizard magazine gave the Genesis version a score of A− praising the graphics, the realistic gameplay and the feature to customize your boxer. The only criticism he had was some of the characters movements are too choppy concluding: "This game is a must have for boxing fans of all ages and anyone who likes sports games." The four reviewers of Mega Play gave the Genesis version positive reviews praising the graphics, sound effects, animation, and the ability to customize characters. One reviewer felt the gameplay was robotic and lacks variety in punching and techniques.
