= Robin Hood: Defender of the Crown =

2003 video game

- Developers: Cinemaware (PS2); Atomic Planet Entertainment (PC, Xbox); Simian Industries (Mobile)
- Publishers: WW: Capcom; EU: ZOO Digital Group (PC); WW: I-play (Mobile)
- Platforms: PlayStation 2 Windows; Xbox; Mobile phone
- Release: PlayStation 2, Xbox: NA: September 30, 2003 (PS2); NA: November 11, 2003 (Xbox); EU: November 28, 2003; Windows: NA: September 30, 2003; EU: March 5, 2004; Mobile; August 19, 2004
- Genre: Turn-based strategy
- Mode: Single player

Robin Hood: Defender of the Crown is a 2003 turn-based strategy video game developed by Cinemaware and published by Capcom. It is loosely based on the legend of Robin Hood and remake of Cinemaware's previous game Defender of the Crown, released for PlayStation 2, Windows, Xbox, and mobile phones.

== Plot ==
It is a time of great unrest in England. With King Richard the Lionheart held for ransom, the evil Prince John seizes the throne, and declares himself the King of England. The entire nation soon falls into civil war as greedy nobles war amongst themselves and Prince John sends forth armies to shackle the country under his unjust rule.

In this time of lawlessness, only an outlaw can lead the people to freedom. One man, the embodiment of true honor, vows to save his people and restore peace to the land. This man is known as Robin Hood. From the small-scale skirmishes with the Sheriff of Nottingham in Sherwood Forest, Robin finds himself drawn into the larger battlefields of England, and the hero of the poor must become the savior of an entire nation.

== Gameplay ==
Robin Hood is a blend of role-playing and turn-based strategy combined with action sequences.

As Robin Hood, the player must:

- Fund the war effort by lightening the purses of traveling merchants in archery ambushes.
- Lay siege to castles using mighty siege engines and Greek Fire.
- Joust in tournaments for fame, fortune and land.
- Conquer England's 38 territories by commanding troops on the battlefield and manage Robin's growing armies.
- Sword fight through battlements, catacombs and towers in search of treasure – or to rescue a damsel-in-distress.

The game also features:

- Special events, multiple goals and non-linear gameplay.
- A story of action, drama, romance and adventure.
- Twenty minutes of rendered cutscenes and a full hour of recorded voice acting.
- 8 different alternate game endings depending on the player's actions through the game.

== Reception ==
Reception

Aggregate scores
Aggregator	Score			
Aggregator	mobile	PC	PS2	Xbox
GameRankings	60%	68%	63%	55%
Metacritic	N/A	63/100	59/100	57/100

Review scores
Publication	Score			
Publication	mobile	PC	PS2	Xbox
Electronic Gaming Monthly	N/A	N/A	4.5/10	4.5/10
Game Informer	N/A	N/A	5.25/10	6.75/10
GameRevolution	N/A	N/A	D	N/A
GameSpot	5/10	6/10	6/10	6/10
GameSpy	N/A	N/A	2/5	2/5
GameZone	N/A	N/A	6.5/10	N/A
IGN	N/A	7.1/10	7.1/10	7.1/10
Official U.S. PlayStation Magazine	N/A	N/A	2.5/5	N/A
Official Xbox Magazine (US)	N/A	N/A	N/A	5.7/10
X-Play	N/A	N/A	2/5	N/A

The PC, PlayStation 2 and Xbox versions received "mixed" reviews according to the review aggregation website Metacritic. IGN said, "With all the elements that come into play, Defender of the Crown is overly enjoyable – especially for fans of strategy titles who want to be able to pick up and play something without too much of a hassle."
