= Time Trax =

- Created by: Harve Bennett; Jeffrey M. Hayes; Grant Rosenberg
- Starring: Dale Midkiff; Elizabeth Alexander
- Countries of origin: United States; Australia
- No. of seasons: 2
- No. of episodes: 44

Production
- Running time: 60 minutes
- Production companies: Gary Nardino Productions; Lorimar Television (1993) (season 1); Warner Bros. Television (1993-1994) (seasons 1-2)

Original release
- Network: Prime Time Entertainment Network
- Release: January 20, 1993 – December 3, 1994

Time Trax is a science fiction television series that first aired in 1993. A police officer, sent two centuries into the past to a parallel universe, must apprehend and return convicted criminals who have escaped prison in the future. This was the last new production from Lorimar Television.

== Premise ==
In the year 2193, over a hundred criminals become fugitives of law enforcement by traveling back in time two hundred years to a parallel Universe, using a time machine called Trax. Darien Lambert is a police detective of that period who is sent back to 1993 in order to apprehend as many of the fugitives as possible. He is assisted by the Specified Encapsulated Limitless Memory Archive, or SELMA, an extremely small but very powerful computer (described as equivalent to a mainframe) disguised for the mission as a credit card; SELMA communicates through a holographic interface which takes the visual form of a woman. Lambert is also equipped with a Micro-Pellet Projection Tube disguised as a keyless car alarm remote, which can stun targets or engulf them in an energy field, rendering them transportable to the future. This process, executed by SELMA, incorporates a transmission sequence to send the criminal on his way. Dr. Mordecai Sahmbi, who was responsible for sending the fugitives to 1993, tries several times to kill Lambert.

Captain Lambert, fearing the possible consequences of altering the timeline, does not actively attempt to interfere with the natural flow of history, although he frequently leaves messages for his colleagues in 2193 (via the personals sections of assorted newspapers).

== Cast ==
Dale Midkiff as Capt. Darien Lambert and Elizabeth Alexander as SELMA

=== Regular ===
- Dale Midkiff as Captain Darien Lambert, Fugitive Retrieval Section. A police officer from the 22nd century. Born in 2160 and abandoned by his parents, he was raised in Enclave I-6 Middle City, the area formerly known as Chicago Land. As a child of his time, he has abilities superior to those of 20th-century humans: IQ 204, a speed memorization rate of 1.2 pages per second, a top speed of 8.6 seconds for 100 m, a heartbeat of 35 beats per minute and a life expectancy of 120 years, as well as mental focusing capabilities from beta wave training, including the ability to slow down the speed of visual images reaching the brain. He attended the International Police Academy at West Point, from which he graduated first in his class. In 2193, after over a hundred criminals escaped back to 1993, he is sent back to 1993 to retrieve them.
- Elizabeth Alexander as SELMA (Specified Encapsulated Limitless Memory Archive), an advanced computer AI disguised as Darien's credit card. Selma communicates with both a voice and a holographic interface based on a picture of Darien's mother. Selma can place phone calls, perform medical and scientific testing as well as interface with virtually any computer including those belonging to law enforcement agencies, as well as having a vast amount of information in her database.

=== Recurring ===
- Peter Donat as Dr. Mordecai Sahmbi, a MIT professor and winner of the Nobel Prize for Physics for his theoretical work in the teletransportation of particle mass. Creator of the TRAX time machine. He was paid by criminals to send them to the past. In the first episode, he traveled to the past to escape Darien.
- Mia Sara as Annie Knox (Past - 20th century) and Elyssa Knox (Future - 22nd century)
  - Elyssa Knox was a young prodigy, accepted to MIT at age 9. By age 17, she was Dr. Sahmbi's most gifted student. In episode 1, she became Darien's love interest.
  - Annie Knox: A Secret Service Agent whom Darien encounters after his arrival and in several other episodes.

== Episode list ==
=== Season 1 ===
No. overall	No. in season	Title	Directed by	Written by	Original release date	Prod. code
1	1	"A Stranger In Time"	Lewis Teague	Harve Bennett	20 January 1993	296609-01
2	2	"A Stranger In Time"	Lewis Teague	Harve Bennett	20 January 1993	296609-02
A police captain in the year 2193 travels back in time 200 years to apprehend fugitives from his own time.
3	3	"To Kill a Billionaire"	Colin Budds	Harold Gast	3 February 1993	296609-04
Dr. Sahmbi concocts a scheme to send nuclear waste to the twenty-second century under the guise of a business.
4	4	"Fire and Ice"	Brian Trenchard-Smith	Garner Simmons	10 February 1993	296609-05
Darien tracks down a pair of jewel thieves.
5	5	"Showdown"	Colin Budds	David Loughery	17 February 1993	296609-03
It is a new kind of wild west when Darien teams up with a local lawman to capture a fugitive. But this lawman might not be what he seems.
6	6	"The Prodigy"	Donald Crombie	Tracy Friedman	24 February 1993	296609-06
When a boy (Rider Strong) displays unusual athletic prowess, Darien suspects both the boy and his father are from the future.
7	7	"Death Takes a Holiday"	Rob Stewart	Ronald M. Cohen	3 March 1993	296609-09
A fugitive uses his knowledge of future drugs to manage a Mafia family.
8	8	"The Contender"	Rob Stewart	Grant Rosenberg	10 March 1993	296609-07
A fellow time traveler (Bernie Casey) asks Darien to help him bring his son, a banned boxer, back to the future.
9	9	"Night of the Savage"	Colin Budds	Mark Rodgers	17 March 1993	296609-08
Darien travels to London to find a literally bloodthirsty killer known as the Savage.
10	10	"Treasure of the Ages"	Donald Crombie	Jeffrey M. Hayes	31 March 1993	296609-11
A fugitive turned treasure hunter is trapped in a hurricane with Darien.
11	11	"The Price of Honor"	Colin Budds	Mary Ann Kasica and Michael Scheff	7 April 1993	296609-10
A fugitive blackmails the Secretary of State (Dorian Harewood) who will eventually become President of the United States.
12	12	"Face of Death"	Rob Stewart	Garner Simmons	14 April 1993	296609-12
When a plastic surgeon is killed in a strange manner, Darien believes one of the fugitives is responsible. The only problem is the doctor was a plastic surgeon, and now Darien must figure which member of an archeological expedition is his target.
13	13	"Revenge"	Rob Stewart	Ruel Fischmann	5 May 1993	296609-15
Sepp Dietrich has survived the third dose of TXP and resurfaces in Hawaii as leader of a white supremacist group.
14	14	"Darien Comes Home"	Brian Trenchard-Smith	Grant Rosenberg	12 May 1993	296609-14
While visiting Chicago, Darien learns that a man was killed by a future weapon, and goes undercover at a computer company to catch the killers, a pair of fugitive brothers (Christopher Daniel Barnes and Robert Mammone).
15	15	"Two Beans in a Wheel"	Donald Crombie	George Yanok	19 May 1993	296609-13
A woman claiming to be from the future tells Darien that Sahmbi is after the Holy Grail.
16	16	"Little Boy Lost"	Donald Crombie	Harve Bennett	26 May 1993	296609-17
One of Darien's old instructors winds up in the hospital, and Darien seeks the Man's adopted son.
17	17	"The Mysterious Stranger"	Colin Budds	George Yanok and Harve Bennett	27 October 1993	296609-16
Darien travels to Mexico in search of a fugitive who started a drug epidemic in the 22nd century. Along the way he encounters a PI from the future who is not exactly who he seems.
18	18	"Framed"	Chris Thomson	Bill Froehlich	3 November 1993	296609-18
Darien is framed for murder of a federal agent as part of another attempted government takeover by Charley Burke.
19	19	"Beautiful Songbird"	Colin Budds	Tracy Friedman	10 November 1993	296609-19
An obsessed fugitive (John de Lancie) stalks a country singer who is destined to be a star.
20	20	"Photo Finish"	Chris Thomson	Garner Simmons	17 November 1993	296609-22
A fugitive uses an invention of his on race horses.
21	21	"Darrow for the Defense"	Colin Budds	Ruel Fischmann	26 November 1993	296609-20
Laura Darrow (Amy Steel), a lawyer and old friend of Darien's, goes back to 1993 to find her client, who just happens to a fugitive, to inform him he has been acquitted of the charges against him.
22	22	"One On One"	Colin Budds	Harold Gast	1 December 1993	296609-21
Darien becomes the unwilling test subject of Sahmbi's mind control invention.

=== Season 2 ===
No. overall	No. in season	Title	Directed by	Written by	Original release date	Prod. code
23	1	"Return of the Yakuza"	Rob Stewart	Ruel Fischmann	28 January 1994	296609-23
A yakuza from the future and fugitive (Philip Moon) tries to use his knowledge to take over the group in the present day.
24	2	"Missing"	Rob Stewart	Garner Simmons	5 February 1994	296609-25
When Selma is stolen by muggers, Darien teams up with an older officer (Ralph Waite) to save her.
25	3	"To Live or Die in Docker Flats"	Chris Thomson	Michael Ahnemann	12 February 1994	296609-28
When a fugitive is murdered in a small town, Darien stays to find out who did it. But this town is not exactly Mayberry.
26	4	"A Close Encounter"	Colin Budds	Jonathan Glassner	19 February 1994	296609-29
Darien helps an alien find his mate.
27	5	"The Gravity of it All"	Colin Budds	Bill Dial	26 February 1994	296609-27
Darien encounters a professor from the future (John Schuck) who has created a belt allowing people to fly. The problem is terrorists want it as well.
28	6	"Happy Valley"	Chris Thomson	Tracy Friedman	5 March 1994	296609-26
Darien's friend Tulsa Giles enlists his aid in discovering why home buyers in a certain subdivision are losing their minds.
29	7	"Lethal Weapons"	Chris Thomson	Grant Rosenberg	12 March 1994	296609-24
A futuristic arms dealer is manufacturing 22nd century weapons and selling to 20th century criminals.
30	8	"The Cure"	Ian Barry	Harold Gast	19 March 1994	296609-31
Darien travels to Australia and encounters Dr. Sahmbi's fraudulent attempt to treat people for diseases by using TXP.
31	9	"Perfect Pair"	Rob Stewart	Robert McCullough	23 April 1994	296609-30
Darien's old partner Mace Warfield arrives in the 20th century with an assignment for both of them: to track down and retrieve a corrupt police captain.
32	10	"Catch Me If You Can"	Rob Stewart	Babs Greyhosky	30 April 1994	296609-36
Darien teams up with a female U.S. Marshal to pursue a bank robbing 22nd century fugitive who manages to stay one step ahead.
33	11	"The Dream Team"	Harve Bennett	Harve Bennett	7 May 1994	296609-34
A basketball star turned priest (Julius Erving) needs protection after hearing the confession of a future fugitive while in prison.
34	12	"Almost Human"	Colin Budds	David Loughery and Laurie Stevens	14 May 1994	296609-32
Sahmbi creates an android double for Darien, and then sets him on Darien's trail.
35	13	"Mother"	Colin Budds	Ruel Fischmann	21 May 1994	296609-37
Darien pursues a fugitive who leads him to Kathryn Logan (Elizabeth Alexander in a dual role), his mother.
36	14	"The Last M.I.A."	Ian Barry	Michael Ahnemann	28 May 1994	296609-39
After being wounded in an encounter with a fugitive, Darien is nursed back to health by a military veteran (Ronny Cox), who asks Darien's assistance in finding his son, still missing in action in Cambodia.
37	15	"Split Image"	Colin Budds	Grant Rosenberg	15 October 1994	296609-41
A female cat burglar is caught in the act, but uses a futuristic weapon to escape.
38	16	"Cool Hand Darien"	Jeffrey M. Hayes	Jeffrey M. Hayes	22 October 1994	296609-40
The widow of a fugitive, reported dead, asks Darien's help in finding out what really happened.
39	17	"The Lottery"	Mark Defriest	Garner Simmons	29 October 1994	296609-43
A comedian in the 20th Century turns out to have been someone who was Darien's favorite comic performer in the 22nd Century.
40	18	"Out For Blood"	Colin Budds	David H. Balkan	5 November 1994	296609-35
Darien must prevent the murder of an innocent woman (Jeri Ryan) by a man from the future intent on keeping her from having descendants, one of whom will become a murderer in the 22nd Century who will kill his girlfriend.
41	19	"The Scarlet Koala"	Rob Stewart	Tracy Friedman	12 November 1994	296609-38
A rare Koala must be found by Darien in order to stop a plague that will decimate the 22nd Century.
42	20	"Optic Nerve"	Donald Crombie	David Loughery and Laurie Stevens	19 November 1994	296609-42
Captain Lambert is attacked and blinded by a criminal from the future.
43	21	"The Crash"	Donald Crombie	Ruel Fischmann	26 November 1994	296609-44
Darien Lambert apprehends a fugitive, who tries to cut a deal by leading the cop from the future to his boss, a much more important criminal.
44	22	"Forgotten Tomorrows"	Rob Stewart	James L. Novack	3 December 1994	296609-33
Darien is exposed to DXT while protecting a witness in a trial, which causes full memory loss.

== Production ==
Time Trax was created by veteran Hollywood producers Harve Bennett, Jeffrey M. Hayes and Grant Rosenberg. Rosenberg came up with the original idea, which Bennett and Hayes helped craft into the final premise. It was one of the first three original programming offerings of the Prime Time Entertainment Network, alongside Kung Fu: The Legend Continues and Babylon 5, and it ran between January 20, 1993, and December 3, 1994. Despite being well received by viewers, the network cancelled the series because they wanted to go in a different direction to increase their viewer base.

Despite its Washington, D.C., setting, the series was shot in Queensland, Australia, near the Warner/Roadshow Studios. It was the last series to premiere under the Lorimar Productions name.

== Home media ==
Time Trax was released on DVD on October 9, 2012, Warner Bros. released the complete first season on DVD in Region 1 via the Warner Archive Collection burn on demand service. The second and final season was released the following year on July 9, 2013.

== International broadcasters ==
- Bangladesh - Bangladesh Television
- India - Doordarshan
- UK - ITV, Sci Fi Channel
- Pakistan - PTV
- Sri Lanka - MTV (Now known as Sirasa TV)
- Germany - Sat.1
- Hungary - RTL Klub
- Israel - Channel 2 (Telad)
- Russia - CTC
- Indonesia - RCTI
- Korea - SBS
- Ukraine - ICTV
- Chile - Canal 13
- Sweden - SVT
- NZ - TVNZ 2 (Originally known as Channel 2 and TV2)
- Australia - Seven Network
- El Salvador - Canal 2 (TCS)
- Argentina - Telefe
- Perú - Canal 13 - Global Televisión

== Video game ==
See main article: Time Trax (video game)

A video game for the Super NES console based on the series was released on the U.S. market by Malibu Games in April 1994 (although some sources list December 1993).

A Sega Genesis version was also developed and completed, and was reviewed in major gaming publications, but it was never released by the publisher. A prototype of the Mega Drive/Genesis version in fully finished state was leaked in 2013. The Genesis version's most notable difference is its soundtrack being composed by Tim Follin.
