= Track Attack =

1982 video game

- Publisher: Broderbund
- Designer: Chris Jochumson
- Programmers: Apple II; Chris Jochumson; Atari 8-bit Bill Hooper
- Platforms: Apple II, Atari 8-bit
- Release: 1982
- Genres: Maze, platform
- Mode: Single-player

Track Attack (stylized as Track Attack!) is a train-themed action game written by Chris Jochumson for the Apple II. It was published in 1982 by Broderbund, as was a port for Atari 8-bit computers by Bill Hooper. Track Attack contains both overhead maze levels and side-scrolling platform levels. In the latter, the player controls a character who runs along the top of a train, performing acrobatic leaps between the cars. Jochumson co-authored The Arcade Machine, which was released the same year.

== Gameplay ==
First stage (Atari 8-bit). The player's blue car is at center.

There are three distinct levels with unique gameplay. The first shows a top-down view of overlapping mazes of roads and train tracks. The player drives a car attempting to—at places where the tracks and road intersect—jump through boxcars and to steal the gold contained within. The second level shows a side view of the train, and the player runs along the top, making aerial somersaults between the cars as the train scrolls horizontally. Reaching the locomotive ends the level. In the third segment the overhead maze returns, but the player now controls the train, picking up gold along the tracks while avoiding vehicles on the road.

== Reception ==
ROM magazine liked the visuals, commenting "The second level of this game are [sic] really impressive. The movement of the little man is smooth and the train is very colorful with fine details." The reviewer disliked the minimal sound, blaming it on the game being ported from the Apple II. It received an overall rating of 8.2 out of 10, with 10s for both playability and graphics.

Reviewing the Atari 8-bit computer translation for Softline, Marcia and Gary Rose concluded, "Track Attack is an original game that makes good use of the cops and robbers theme, an area that has sadly been overlooked in these times of extraterrestrial warfare and adventure." In a "D+" review, Addison Wesley Book of Atari Software 1984 called the controls "somewhat crazy" and found there to be too many random factors in the game.
