= Sports Illustrated: Championship Football & Baseball =

1993 video game

- North American Box art (Super NES)
- Developers: Malibu Interactive (SNES); Halestorm (Game Boy); Unexpected Development (Game Gear)
- Publisher: THQ (Note: Released under the Malibu Games brand on Nintendo platforms and the Black Pearl Software brand on Game Gear)
- Composer: Audio Cyber Factory (Super NES version)
- Platforms: Game Boy, Game Gear, Super Nintendo Entertainment System
- Release: Game Boy: NA: October 1993; Game Gear: NA: 1993; Super NES: NA: February 1994; EU: 1994
- Genre: Sports
- Modes: Single-player, multiplayer

Sports Illustrated: Championship Football & Baseball (known in Europe as All-American Championship Football) is a multiplatform sports video game that is licensed by sports magazine Sports Illustrated which features both American football and baseball games.

== Gameplay ==
In the American football mode, players can play a complete season of 16 games plus playoffs with 90 different players for both teams. Sometimes, the camera zooms in on the action in American football mode when a play is significant enough to affect the overall game. Baseball mode gives the players 28 unlicensed teams in addition to various offensive and defensive plays. Both season modes come with complete league standings, a complete team/league schedule, and team comparisons to each other prior to each game.

== Reception ==
GamePro panned the Super NES version, citing the limited number of options, weak graphics which make it difficult to follow the action, subdued sound effects, and the use of generic teams and players instead of real teams, elaborating that "the lack of player identification keeps you removed from the action."
