= TRAZ =

1988 video game

- Developer: Cascade Games
- Publisher: Cascade Games
- Composer: Jeroen Kimmel
- Platforms: Commodore 64, DOS, ZX Spectrum
- Release: 1988
- Genre: Block breaker
- Modes: Single player, multiplayer

TRAZ (short for Transformable Arcade Zone) is a 1988 block breaker game developed and published by Cascade Games. The game was released in 1988 for the Commodore 64, DOS, and ZX Spectrum.

== Gameplay ==
TRAZ is a block breaker game, but unlike most such games, it supports an arbitrary number of paddles either horizontally or vertically, with the player controlling all of them simultaneously. Also unlike other block breaker games, the edges of the screen are not open but surrounded by a wall that bounces the ball back; hazards are instead represented by beams of electricity (also either horizontal or vertical) that destroy the ball on contact; a turn is lost when all balls are destroyed. Both the beams and the paddles can be anywhere on the map in any alignment, allowing paddles to block each other, or having the hazard in the middle of the screen rather than the edges as traditional. The game consists of 64 levels, as well as an editor mode allowing the player to create their own levels.

== Reception ==
Reception

Review scores
Publication	Score	
Publication	C64	ZX
Crash		81%
Sinclair User		68/100
The Games Machine (UK)	80%	
Zzap!64	87%	
Commodore User	7/10	
