= Defender of the Crown =

1986 video game

- Developer: Cinemaware
- Publisher: Cinemaware
- Designer: Kellyn Beeck
- Artist: James D. Sachs
- Composer: Jim Cuomo
- Platforms: Amiga, C64, Atari ST, MS-DOS, Macintosh, Apple IIGS, Amstrad CPC, ZX Spectrum, NES, CDTV, CD-i, Windows, Game Boy Advance, mobile phone, iOS, Android, Jaguar, Intellivision
- Release: NA: November 1, 1986
- Genre: Strategy
- Mode: Single-player

Defender of the Crown is a strategy video game designed by Kellyn Beeck. It was Cinemaware's first game, and was originally released for the Commodore Amiga in 1986, setting a new standard for graphic quality in home computer games.

In 1987 it was ported to MS-DOS, the Atari ST and the Macintosh and a conversion was done for the Commodore 64. Later it was ported to the CDTV, CD-i and Atari Jaguar and conversions were made for the Nintendo Entertainment System (NES), Amstrad CPC, Apple IIGS and Intellivision. Unofficially a ZX Spectrum version was also made. A sequel, Defender of the Crown II, was released in 1993 for the CDTV and Amiga CD32. Two remakes have been released: Robin Hood: Defender of the Crown in 2003 and Defender of the Crown: Heroes Live Forever in 2007.

== Gameplay ==
The game is set in England in 1149 during the Middle Ages where, following the death of the king, different factions are fighting for territorial control.

The fighting screen was one of the features added to the Atari ST version

The player assumes the role of one of four Saxon, Wilfred of Ivanhoe, Cedric of Rotherwood, Geoffrey Longsword, or Wolfric the Wild, and tries to fight off the Norman hordes and wrestle for control of England. Eventually, the player must fight for control of all territories, including those controlled by other Saxons if they have become antagonistic. The player must amass armies and fight for control of opponents' castles. The player may engage enemy armies in battle and loot or lay siege to opposing castles. Territories can also be won in the periodic jousting contests. From time to time the player may attempt to rescue a damsel in distress and can appeal for help from the legendary bandit Robin Hood.

The game's strategy boils down to a war of attrition as the player tries to amass larger armies than their opponents and manages to attack their territories at the right time.

Due to financial strains, Cinemaware decided to release the initial version without all the features originally planned for because of their need for revenue. Some features were partially implemented, but were removed so the game could be shipped. Some additional features completed but never seen in the shipped game include flaming fireballs (launched via the catapult), more locations (more varied castles to attack), and more in-depth strategy. Some of these features were implemented in later versions of the game.

James D. Sachs, the primary artist for the game, showcased some of these features on the Amiga during interviews after the release of the game.

== Cover art ==
The cover art of Defender of the Crown was put together by Peter Green Design and painted by Ezra Tucker.

Randy McDonald was in charge of art direction, design, and production for Cinemaware's first four games, and he explains in an interview that "Peter Greene or I would do a sketch of generally what we wanted for each cover. I went to Western Costume in Hollywood, which for many decades was the giant in the costume industry there, and rented costumes for the types of "look" we had settled on for each cover. We hired models and brought them into Peter's large photo studio, where we set them up in the costumes I had rented, posed as closely as possible to the way we wanted them to be illustrated."

The initial artist, according to Randy McDonald, was supposed to be Greg Winter, but the cover eventually went to Ezra Tucker.

== Ports ==
Defender of the Crown for MS-DOS and NES have poor graphic and audio quality, but have more in-depth strategic elements compared to the original. The Apple IIGS, Mac, and Atari ST ports have graphics close to the Amiga version.

A version for the X68000 was in development by Bullet-Proof Software but never released.

All versions:

- Amstrad CPC
- Atari ST
- Apple IIGS
- Commodore 64
- Game Boy Advance
- Nintendo Entertainment System
- Mac
- MS-DOS CGA (4 color) and EGA (16 color)
- CD-i
- iOS
- Android
- Jaguar

In 1989, the game became the second game to ship on CD-ROM, after The Manhole.

== Reception ==
The first public demonstration of Defender of the Crown occurred at the Los Angeles Commodore Show in September 1986, before its November release, and attracted a huge crowd. The game amazed those who saw it for the first time:

Screenshot of a raid with graphics in the 1986 Amiga version.

Mical saw artist Jim Sachs push the Amiga to its full potential. "Jim Sachs, what a god he is," marvels Mical. "Jim Sachs is amazing. These days everyone sees graphics like that because there are a lot of really good computer graphics artists now, but back then, 20 years ago, it was astonishing to have someone that good."

The final game was a landmark in video game production values. As game designer Bob Lindstrom recalls, "The shock of seeing Defender for the first time was one of those experiences that changed the gaming stakes for all of us."

Compared to other video games of the time, Defender of the Crown established a new level of quality. IBM had Kings Quest by Sierra On-Line, a decent but primitive adventure game. The Macintosh had games like Checkers or Backgammon, or board games like Risk. Defender of the Crown had richer graphics than any computer, console, or even arcade game could boast in 1986. It was a revelation.

Defender of the Crown became a commercial hit. In 1989, Video Games & Computer Entertainment reported that it had been purchased by "almost three-quarters of a million gamers worldwide". Sales had surpassed 1 million units by 2001.

Info gave the Amiga version four stars out of five, stating that its "graphics have set new standards for computer games". The magazine praised the "breathtaking" animation and "impressive" color, but hoped that future Cinemaware games would improve on the "adequate" gameplay, which was "the weak link". The Australian Commodore Review gave the Commodore 64 version of the game a total score of 96 out of 100, while Commodore User said that it was "totally brilliant and one of the best games to date on the 64." Computer Gaming World praised the Amiga version of Defender of the Crown's graphics and animation, calling the game "a showcase program to demonstrate the power of the Amiga to your friends." Although the gameplay was not as complex as other strategy games of the time, the reviewer was still exceptionally pleased with Cinemaware's first game. That year the magazine gave Defender of the Crown a special award for "Artistic Achievement in a Computer Game", but in 1990 and 1993, surveys of wargames in the magazine gave the game two-plus stars out of five.

Compute! also stated that Defender of the Crown effectively demonstrated the Amiga's graphics, but stated that its gameplay was oversimplified. CU Amiga stated that "there are not many areas in which Defender of the Crown could be improved ... the graphics are sophisticated with lush colours and visual effects." Amiga Format were less kind to the CD rerelease of the game, stating that it "hasn't stood the test of time simply because the gameplay is somewhat weak." Power Unlimited gave the CD-i version a score of 87% writing: "Defender of the Crown is a very varied game. All sorts of things come your way, including tactics, action and romance. Graphically it is also beautifully put together. Too bad it runs quite slowly, like many other CD-I games."

The One magazine in 1991 rated the game four out of five stars for the Amiga, Atari ST and PC. In 1996, Computer Gaming World declared Defender of the Crown the 92nd-best computer game ever released.

== Legacy ==
Defender of the Crown II was published by Commodore International in 1993 for the CDTV and Amiga CD32.

After a string of successful games and game series, Cinemaware eventually went bankrupt. In 2000, however, Lars Fuhrken-Batista and Sean Vesce bought Cinemaware's name and assets, and founded Cinemaware Inc., naming a remake of Defender of the Crown for modern PCs as one of the reformed company's first projects. The new version, titled Robin Hood: Defender of the Crown was released in 2003 for the PlayStation 2 (September 30), Xbox (October 6), and Windows (October 15). The new company also created "Digitally Remastered Versions" of classic Cinemaware games, including Defender of the Crown.

In February 2007, a second remake to the game called Defender of the Crown: Heroes Live Forever was released by eGames, who had acquired Cinemaware in 2005. Heroes Live Forever features many of the elements of the original game, including jousting and archery tournaments, raiding castles, rescuing princesses, and laying siege to enemy fortresses via catapult. A new addition to the game involved the use of Hero and Tactic cards during battles, giving the user's army various upgrades during the on-screen melee.

During the second half of the 1980s, some games directly inspired by Defender of the Crown were released. Among these was for example Joan of Arc (Rainbow Arts, 1989).

The Danish band PRESS PLAY ON TAPE remixed the theme music of the game on their 2003 album Run/Stop Restore, replacing the instrumental tune with proper medieval-sounding lyrics.
