= Thunderstrike (video game) =

1990 video game

- Developer(s): Millennium Interactive
- Publisher(s): Millennium Interactive
- Platform(s): MS-DOS, Atari ST, Amiga
- Release: 1990
- Genre(s): First-person shooter
- Mode(s): Single-player

Thunderstrike is a futuristic 3D shooter game released by Millennium Interactive in 1990.

== Plot ==
The year is 2238 and the most popular sport in the world is the Military Olympics, in which gladiators in various combat aircraft fight robot drones and each other for victory.

== Gameplay ==
Players control a low-flying combat aircraft in a series of combat arenas filled with enemy robot drones. They start with the titular "Thunderstrike" fighter by default, but may choose between five different models, all differing in flight characteristics.

Players must defend their base installations (red pyramids) from attack by various robot drones; if they are all destroyed the game is lost. Meanwhile, they must find and destroy the robot spawn bases (blue/red bunkers); when these are all destroyed the round is won and the player progresses to the next arena.

== Reception ==
Computer Gaming World advised flight-simulator fans to avoid Thunderstrike, but that "those who want a challenging game with more than the average arcade style, however, are bound to be pleasanty surprised ... addicting".
