= Battle Cars =

1993 video game

- Cover art
- Developer: Malibu Interactive
- Publisher: Namco Hometek
- Platform: Super Nintendo Entertainment System
- Release: NA: October 1993
- Genres: Racing, Vehicular combat
- Modes: Single-player, multiplayer

Battle Cars is a 1993 racing video game developed by Malibu Interactive and published by Namco Hometek for the Super Nintendo Entertainment System. It is a futuristic racing game in which cars are equipped with multiple weapons which are used to eliminate opponents. It was only released in North America.

== Gameplay ==
The game can be played solo or in multiplayer. In a solo game, the player progresses through a series of progressively harder levels. The main game features nine levels, each with two race tracks; one cross-country and one circuit. Two players can alternate as each progresses through the levels of the one-player game, or they may go head-to-head in a number of race tracks. The main game features nine levels, each with two race tracks; one cross-country and one circuit.

The game is set in a post-apocalyptic world in which the sport of choice is a violent auto race called "Battle Cars." The player can select from three vehicles at the start of the game in a variety of colors, to be played for the duration of the game. The choices are a spiked vehicle, a hot rod, and a formula one-style race car. The vehicles driven by the level bosses are unavailable to play in the main game, but the first three bosses’ vehicles are available in 2 player single races, including alternate colors.

The player can upgrade their vehicle by spending cash earned by defeating enemies on cross-country circuits. Each category may be upgraded to level eight. The game features three weapons: Missiles (which home in on another racer once shot), Disks (which fire straight in front of your car and bounce around the race track until they hit another racer) and Grenades (which are thrown ahead of other racers and explode on contact). These can be upgraded up to five levels, each increasing in speed and accuracy. Weapon upgrades are purchased using credits obtained from quickly completing Cross-Country races.

Single exhibition races can also be played in 2 player mode where 2 players face off in split screen.

== Reception ==
Reception

Review scores
Publication	Score
AllGame	2.5/5
Electronic Gaming Monthly	31/40
GamePro	16/20
M! Games	58%
Nintendo Power	13.3/20
Super Play	73%
Video Games (DE)	70%
VideoGames & Computer Entertainment	6/10
Super Action	89%
Ultimate Future Games	3/5
