= ABC Wide World of Sports Boxing =

1991 video game

ABC Wide World Of Sports Boxing
- North American cover art
- Developers: Acme Interactive; Cinemaware
- Publishers: NA: Data East; EU: Mindscape
- Producers: Jerry Albright; Ian McGee
- Designers: Michael Knauer; Jerry Albright; John Cutter
- Programmer: Michael Knauer
- Artists: Jeff Godfrey; John Duggan; Russel Comte
- Composers: Brian Howarth; Bernard Whang
- Platforms: MS-DOS, Amiga
- Release: 1991
- Genres: Versus fighting, sports

ABC Wide World Of Sports Boxing is a boxing video game released in 1991. The player can create, train, and manage their own character. It is based on the American Broadcasting Company (ABC) program Wide World of Sports and was released at the time of the program's 30th anniversary. Sportscaster Dan Dierdorf, then a boxing commentator for ABC, is featured in this game.

In Europe the game was renamed TV Sports Boxing and published by Mindscape as part of Cinemaware's TV Sports series.

== Reception ==
Computer Gaming World stated that the game's fighting animation was inferior to that of 4D Boxing but that its career options were superior.
