= Cinemaware =

Video game developer

- Cinemaware logo from 2008
- Formerly: Master Designer Software (1986-1988)
- Industry: Video games
- Founded: January 1986
- Founders: Robert Jacob; Phyllis Jacob
- Defunct: 1991
- Successors: Acme Interactive
- Headquarters: Langhorne, PA
- Products: Defender of the Crown; It Came from the Desert; Wings
- Website: cinemaware.com (archived)

Cinemaware was a video game developer and publisher. It had released several titles in the 1980s based on various film themes. The company was resurrected in 2000, before being acquired by eGames in 2005.

== Cinemaware Corp. (1986–1991) ==
The company was founded in January 1986 by Phyllis and Robert “Bob” Jacob as Master Designer Software. The company initially released games under a partnership with Mindscape. The company initially released games under the Cinemaware label.

Cinemaware's first title was Defender of the Crown, a strategy computer game originally released for the Commodore Amiga. Bob Jacob was a film buff, and Cinemaware released other games based on classic film genres which were made as an attempt to emphasize action, graphics, and ease of play. Its games generally debuted on the most graphically powerful home computers of the era, the Amiga, Apple IIGS, and Atari ST, and then ported to others, such as the Commodore 64, PC (running under MS-DOS), and the Nintendo Entertainment System. Defender of the Crown is the most ported Cinemaware game.

In its company's early years, the company had a distribution deal with Mindscape, before Master Designer Software decided to distribute its titles independently. The company intended to expand in 1987 with Cinemaware Corporation being incorporated a separate company before being dissolved in 1988 and reincorporated under the name Cinemaware Corporation.

Cinemaware expanded to sports games, with its "TV Sports" line, which featured elements of sports telecasts such as studio announcers. The "TV Sports" line covered basketball, ice hockey, and football. Some of the titles were only known by the generic name "TV Sports" in Europe such asTV Sports: Boxing and TV Sports: Baseball, which were released in the United States by Data East as ABC Wide World of Sports Boxing and Bo Jackson Baseball, respectively. In 1989, the company debuted its Spotlight Software label in order to release foreign titles for the American market, most notably Speedball.

By 1990, the NEC owned 15% of Cinemaware. Cinemaware went bankrupt in 1991. Coupled with falling sales of its other titles amid an economic downturn, the company suffered. The company also suffered from software piracy, threatening to stop publishing Amiga games at several points because of the ease by which video games could be copied. After Cinemaware went bankrupt, the Cinemaware name and brand was sold to Mirrorsoft, which the company's financial troubles allowed to sell the brand to Mindscape in 1992, and Bob Jacob created a spiritual successor to the company called Acme Interactive, which inherited the Cinemaware design team, which was later merged with Malibu Comics Entertainment in 1992. One of Acme's games, Wings 2: Aces High, was a sequel to a title by Cinemaware. Many of the laid off team members, including David Riordan and David Todd, whose group was Mass Media, went on to Philips to start out Philips POV Entertainment Group, before becoming an independent developer with the Mass Media name.

=== Releases ===
Cinemaware's titles include the following:

- Defender of the Crown (swashbuckling movies; 1986, Apple IIGS, Amiga, Atari ST, Commodore 64, ZX Spectrum, Amstrad CPC, MS-DOS, Macintosh, CD-I)
- S.D.I. (Cold War era space drama; 1986, Amiga, Atari ST, Amstrad CPC, ZX Spectrum, MS-DOS, Macintosh)
- The King of Chicago (inspired by mob movies; 1987, Apple IIGS, Amiga, Atari ST, MS-DOS, Macintosh)
- Sinbad and the Throne of the Falcon (Sinbad and Arabian nights movies; 1987, Apple IIGS, Amiga, Atari ST, Commodore 64, MS-DOS)
- The Three Stooges (The Three Stooges short subjects; 1987, Apple IIGS, Amiga, Commodore 64, MS-DOS)
- Rocket Ranger (1950s science fiction serials; 1988, Apple IIGS, Amiga, Atari ST, Commodore 64, MS-DOS)
- TV Sports: Football (1988, Amiga, Atari ST, Commodore 64, MS-DOS, TG-16)
- Lords of the Rising Sun (Japanese Samurai movies; 1988, Amiga, Atari ST, MS-DOS, TG-16, CD-I)
- Disney's Cartoon Arcade (1989 Viewmaster Interactive Vision)
- It Came from the Desert (1950s science fiction/monster movies; 1989, Amiga, Mega Drive, TG-16, MS-DOS)
- TV Sports: Baseball (1989, Amiga, TG-16)
- TV Sports: Basketball (1990, Amiga, MS-DOS, TG-16)
- Antheads: It Came from the Desert 2 (1990, Amiga)
- Wings (World War I movies; 1990, Amiga)
- TV Sports: Boxing (1991, Amiga, MS-DOS)
- TV Sports: Hockey (1991, TG-16)

== Post-Company Brand History ==
Lars Fuhrken-Batista later bought the Cinemaware trademark and associated intellectual property and its game library in 1999, founding Cinemaware Inc. in 2000. Cinemaware developed recreations of its past titles, updated for Microsoft Windows and the Apple Macintosh. Dubbed the "Digitally Remastered" editions, these games feature the same gameplay as the originals, but with updated graphics. It also ported some of its older games to handheld systems, such as the Game Boy Advance. On its website, it has also released disk images of its original titles for use with emulators and some are emulated via Macromedia Shockwave.

The new Cinemaware developed newer versions of Cinemaware games. Their first game in this endeavor was Robin Hood: Defender of the Crown, released in September 2003 for Windows, PlayStation 2, and Xbox. On October 6, 2005, Cinemaware was acquired by predominantly family-oriented game publisher eGames, Inc.

=== Releases ===
- Robin Hood: Defender of the Crown (2003, PS2, Xbox, Windows)
- Defender of the Crown (2002, GBA)
- The Three Stooges (GBA, PlayStation)
- Wings (2003, GBA)
- Torrente (video game) (2003, Windows)
- Defender of the Crown: Digitally Remastered Edition (Windows, Macintosh)
- The Three Stooges: Digitally Remastered Edition (2002, Windows, Mac)
- Wings: Digitally Remastered Edition (postponed, Windows, Mac)
- Lords of the Rising Sun: Digitally Remastered Edition (postponed, Windows, Mac)
- Wings Remastered (2014, Windows, Mac)

In May 2016, Swedish game developer and publisher Starbreeze acquired all Cinemaware intellectual property rights from Cinemaware. The rights include all brands, websites, existing products, and licenses including the Cinemaware label.

In January 2024, Lithuanian game developer and publisher Nordcurrent acquired all Cinemaware intellectual property rights from Starbreeze. The company states that this aligns with the company's vision to establish its division Nordcurrent Labs in the PC and console games publishing sector.
