= Batter Up (game controller) =

Baseball bat-shaped video game controller

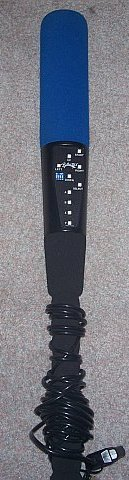
The Batter Up controller for the Super Nintendo

Batter Up is a foam-covered plastic baseball bat controller manufactured for the Sega Genesis, Super Nintendo Entertainment System and PC by Sports Sciences Inc.

The Batter Up controller worked by sensing the timing of the swing and simulating a fire button press in response, so it was compatible with a wide range of games that supported a sufficiently simple control scheme. Sports Sciences also made TeeV Golf, a similar motion-sensing controller for golf games which had to be configured using a card for each game it supported.

== Compatible SNES games ==
- Cal Ripken Jr. Baseball, 1992 Mindscape
- ESPN Baseball Tonight, 1994 Sony Imagesoft
- Hardball III, 1994 Accolade
- Ken Griffey Jr. Presents Major League Baseball, 1994 Nintendo
- Ken Griffey, Jr.'s Winning Run, 1996 Nintendo
- MLBPA Baseball, 1994 EA Sports
- Sports Illustrated: Championship Football & Baseball, 1993 Malibu Games
- Tecmo Super Baseball, 1994 Tecmo
- Super Batter Up, 1993 Namco

== Compatible Genesis games ==
- Sports Talk Baseball, 1992 Sega
- World Series Baseball, 1994 Sega
- Hardball III, 1993 Accolade
- Hardball '94, 1994 Accolade
- RBI Baseball '93, 1993 Tengen
- RBI Baseball '94, 1994 Tengen
- Cal Ripken Jr. Baseball, 1992 Mindscape
- ESPN Baseball Tonight, 1994 Sony Imagesoft
- Super Baseball 2020, 1993 Electronic Arts
- Tony La Russa Baseball, 1993 EA Sports
- MLBPA Baseball, 1994 EA Sports

== Reception ==
According to a 1995 press release, Batter Up was "chosen as a winner of Innovations '95 by the Consumer Electronics Show."

Popular Science included Batter Up in their list of 1994's "100 Greatest Achievements in Science and Technology". Wired included it in their roundup of new products in April 1995, saying "Who says videogames encourage lethargy? ... I wonder what would happen if you used it to play Mortal Kombat?", and Playboy similarly highlighted it as a "cool sports gadget" in March 1995. Men's Health identified Batter Up as part of a 1995 trend for "exertainment" products that combined exercise equipment and computers.

Electronic Games reviewed the Sega Genesis version of Batter Up in April 1995, with reviewer Ed Dille noting that the controller was limited to sensing the timing of the swing and not the direction, and describing it as "more a toy than a tool".

Steve Bauman reviewed the PC version for Computer Games Strategy Plus in October 1995, again noting the limitations of the sensors, but saying that it was "one of the cheapest ways to add a pseudo-virtual reality device to your PC ... still the ultimate party favor for your next baseball get-together".

== See also ==
- Super Scope
- Wii Remote
