= Bit rate reduction =

Bit rate reduction may refer to:

- Bit-rate reduction, a synonym for data compression
- Bit Rate Reduction, an audio compression format used by the SPC-700 processing core of the Nintendo S-SMP, the audio processing unit of the Super Nintendo Entertainment System
