= HardBall III =

1992 video game

- Super NES cover art
- Developer: MindSpan
- Publisher: Accolade
- Producers: Pam Levins; Pam Davis
- Designers: Mike Benna; Jeff Sember
- Programmers: Mike Benna; Jeff Sember
- Artist: John Boechler
- Composer: Alistair Hirst
- Platforms: MS-DOS, Genesis, Super NES
- Release: MS-DOS: NA: 1992; EU: 1992; Genesis/Mega Drive: NA: March 1993; EU: May 1993; Super NES: NA: June 1994
- Genre: Sports
- Modes: Single-player, multiplayer

HardBall III is a baseball video game developed by MindSpan and published by Accolade between 1992 and 1994 for MS-DOS, Genesis, and the Super Nintendo Entertainment System. It is licensed by the Major League Baseball Players Association and is the sequel to HardBall II.

== Ports ==
In November 1993, Accolade signed an agreement with Atari Corporation to be a third-party developer for the recently released Jaguar and licensed five games from their catalog to Atari, including HardBall III (then titled Al Michaels Announces HardBall III). It was announced in early 1994. It was originally planned for a Q3 1995 release date and was being developed by NuFX. However, the port went unreleased for unknown reasons.

== Reception ==
Reception

Review scores
Publication	Score	
Publication	Sega Genesis	SNES
Electronic Gaming Monthly	N/A	8/10; 7/10; 5/10; 7/10; 8/10
GamePro	N/A	3.5/5; 4/5; 4/5; 3.5/5
Joypad	81%	N/A
Total!	N/A	62%
MegaTech	69/100	N/A
Sega Force	63/100	N/A

Computer Gaming World in 1992 said that "HardBall III looks like another winner", complementing its emphasis on action while also providing simulation functions. The magazine praised its "glorious" support for VGA graphics and sound cards, and concluded that the game "packs more features in a single box than any of its competitors". Reviewing the Super NES version, GamePro praised the huge number of options and player stats, but felt the rough graphics and "choppy" player movements reduce the game to merely above average.
