= Tecmo Super Baseball =

1994 video game

- North American box art (Super NES version)
- Developer: Sculptured Software
- Publisher: Tecmo
- Composer: Rick Rhodes
- Platforms: Super NES; Sega Genesis
- Release: Genesis: NA: October 15, 1994; Super NES: NA/JP: 1994
- Genre: Professional baseball
- Modes: Single-player, multiplayer

Tecmo Super Baseball is a professional baseball video game that was released in 1994 for the Super NES and Sega Genesis gaming systems. It features all 28 MLB teams that existed at the time. However, the only license the game has is the MLBPA license. This means that while the game does feature actual players, there are no team names or logos. The teams wear uniforms without logos and are only named by their city (the teams that share the cities of Chicago and New York are separated by having either an A or N after their name, denoting their league).

The main menu theme is a cover of "Take Me Out to the Ball Game".

== Modes ==
=== Pre-season ===
This is a single exhibition game between any two teams. The player can face the computer, play against another player, or let the computer go at it. In addition, there is the coach option, which allows the player to act as a manager. In this mode, the player selects what kind of pitches will be thrown and what kind of batting swings will be taken, but then lets the computer execute the actions.

Tecmo Super Baseball in action (SNES version)

=== Regular season ===
The player selects the status of all 28 teams (play, coach, watch, or skip) and goes through a complete season (the schedule is based on the 1994 season), ending with the playoffs and finally the World Championship Series. Along the way, stats are kept for every team and player in the league.

=== Super Stars ===
A game can be played between the Super Star teams (a copyright-free name for the All-Star teams). Players can use either the All-Star teams from 1993 or draft their own team.

=== Team data ===
Here, players can view all of the players' statistics from 1993, as well as their statistics for the game's current season, if one is in progress.

== Reception ==
On release, Famicom Tsūshin scored the Super Famicom version of the game a 23 out of 40. GamePro called it "a statistics-filled gaming experience that also generates some real excitement." They complimented the large number of options, the high degree of control over the game, and the rendition of "Take Me Out to the Ball Game", though they felt that most of the game's music was mediocre.
