= MLBPA Baseball =

1994 video game

- Cover art (Super NES)
- Developers: Visual Concepts (SNES); High Score Productions (Genesis); Beam Software (Game Gear)
- Publishers: NA: EA Sports; JP: Coconuts Japan
- Platforms: Super Nintendo Entertainment System; Sega Genesis; Game Gear
- Release: 1994
- Genre: Sports (professional baseball)
- Modes: Single-player multiplayer

MLBPA Baseball, known in Japan as Fighting Baseball (Fighting(ファイティング)ベースボール, Faitingu Bēsubōru; "Fighting Baseball"), is a baseball video game for the Super NES, Sega Genesis, and Game Gear.

== Summary ==
The game included the 1993 season's major league players and stats thanks to its MLBPA license, but could not use team names for lack of an MLB license. The game got around this by using the city names of each team with matching colors, and using terms "A League", "N League", and "The Series". Notably, MLB teams representing a state are referred to by a city in that state instead, for instance, the Florida Marlins are referred to as Miami in the game. Players are allowed to play a single game (with the default teams being Philadelphia at Toronto, the 1993 league champs), a full season based on the 1994 schedule (with wins and losses recorded by password in the SNES version, battery back-up for Genesis), playoffs, and a World Series. Though the full season mode is based on the 1994 schedule, it does not include the new (and current) three divisions/wild card format introduced for the 1994 season; instead it uses the old two division (per league) format.

Couched in what the packaging billed as "huge arcade style graphics," games could be played on either natural or artificial grass (depending on the home team) during day or night. The game also featured scoreboard animations for double and triple plays, home runs, grand slams, pitching changes, pinch hitters, and sometimes strike outs.

The SNES version is the first ever baseball video game to include the Atlanta Braves' distinctive Tomahawk Chop theme song, which is advertised on the back of the game box.

The game's cover features Brent Gates of the Oakland Athletics and Billy Hatcher of the Boston Red Sox.

The Japanese version of Fighting Baseball did not have the MLBPA license and used modified player names and statistics.

== Reception ==
On release, Famicom Tsūshin scored the Super Famicom version of the game a 20 out of 40. GamePro praised the easy controls, digitized voices, and the ability to control the ball after it leaves the pitcher's hand, but criticized the lack of real teams and the so-so graphics. They summarized it as an enjoyable game that falls short of ranking among the best in the genre.

A two-column list of 22 fictional American-sounding player names from the Japanese version

The Japanese version of Fighting Baseball, which did not have the MLBPA license, achieved fame on the Internet in 2017 when the programmer-created rosters went viral. The game's players include examples of Engrish and included names such as 'Sleve McDichael' and 'Bobson Dugnutt’, many of which are based on combining actual MLB and NHL player names.
