= Cal Ripken Jr. Baseball =

1992 video game

- North American Super NES cover art
- Developer: Acme Interactive
- Publisher: Mindscape
- Producer: Ian McGee
- Programmers: Craig Ewert (Genesis); Nigel Spencer (SNES)
- Composer: Brian Howarth
- Platforms: Sega Genesis, Super Nintendo
- Release: NA: 1992; EU: June 1993 (SNES)
- Genre: Sports
- Modes: Single-player, multiplayer

Cal Ripken Jr. Baseball is a sports video game released in 1992 by Mindscape for the Sega Genesis and Super Nintendo Entertainment System. It was a port of TV Sports: Baseball for home computers.

== Gameplay ==
Due to a lack of licensing from Major League Baseball (MLB), the game features no MLB team names, stadiums, or artwork, and Cal Ripken Jr. himself is the only non-fictitious player in the game. The two game modes that are available are Exhibition and League. In Exhibition mode, players can select the field location as either domed or outdoor. Artificial turf or natural grass can be selected which affects gameplay, with artificial turf being faster. Exhibition allows for single player vs computer, 2 players against each other or an entirely computer simulated game can be watched. In League mode there are 16 teams including the player selected team. If the player is in first place at the end of the league, they will enter the playoffs, and then have the chance to win the pennant. If the player’s team wins the pennant, they will face off against another pennant winner in the World Series.

== Reception ==
Reception

Aggregate score
Aggregator	Score
GameRankings	SNES: 70%

Review scores
Publication	Score
Computer and Video Games	SMD: 62/100
GamePro	SNES: 14/20
Total!	SNES: 65%
Video Games (DE)	SNES: 59%
Play Time	SNES: 75%
Super Action	SNES: 85%
Sega Force	SMD: 67%
