= Super Nintendo Entertainment System =

Home video game console

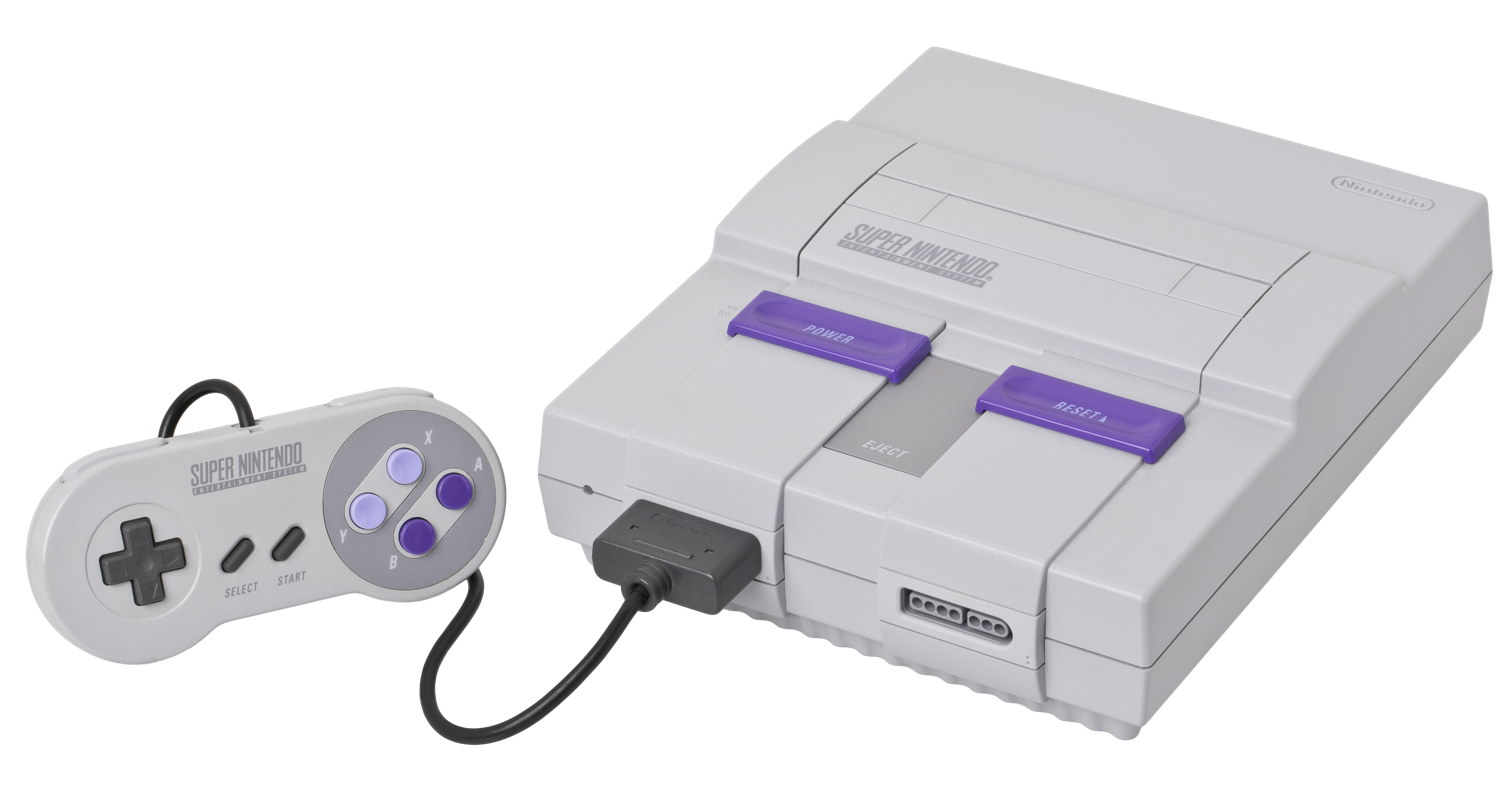
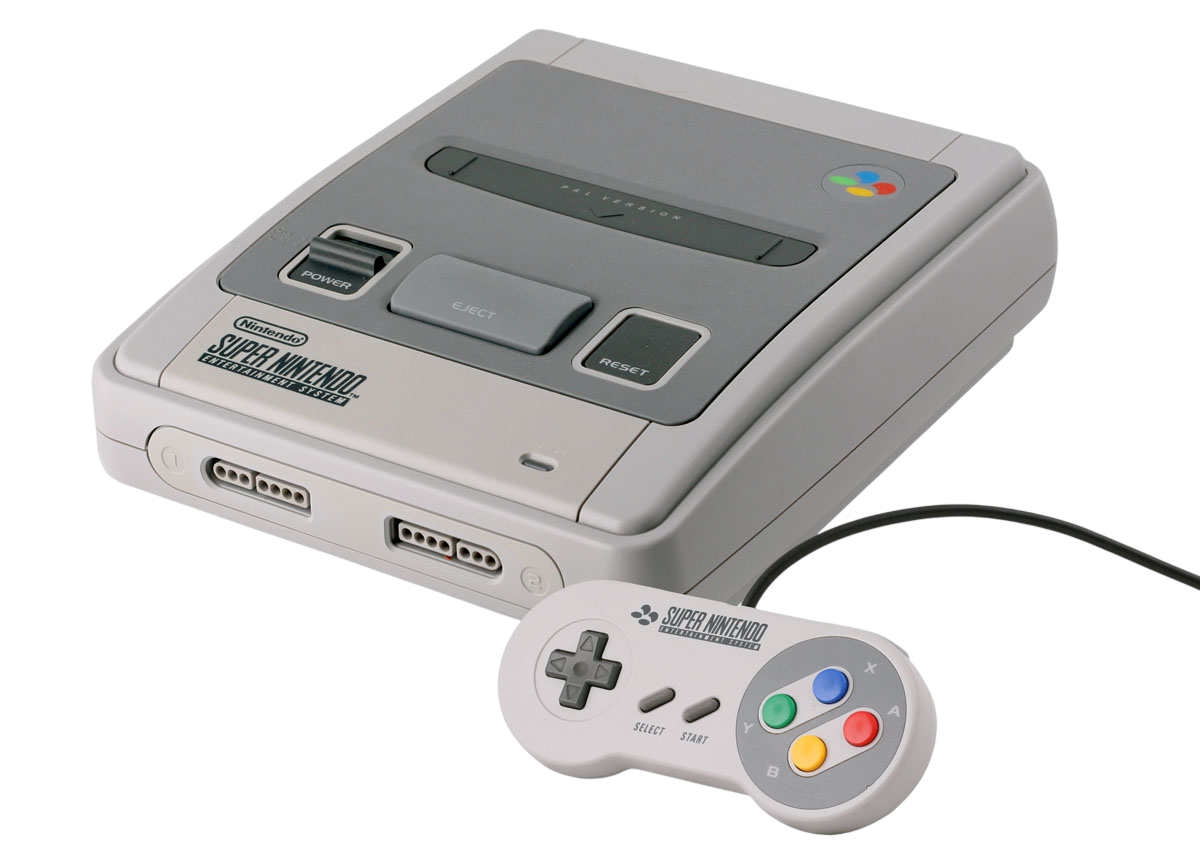
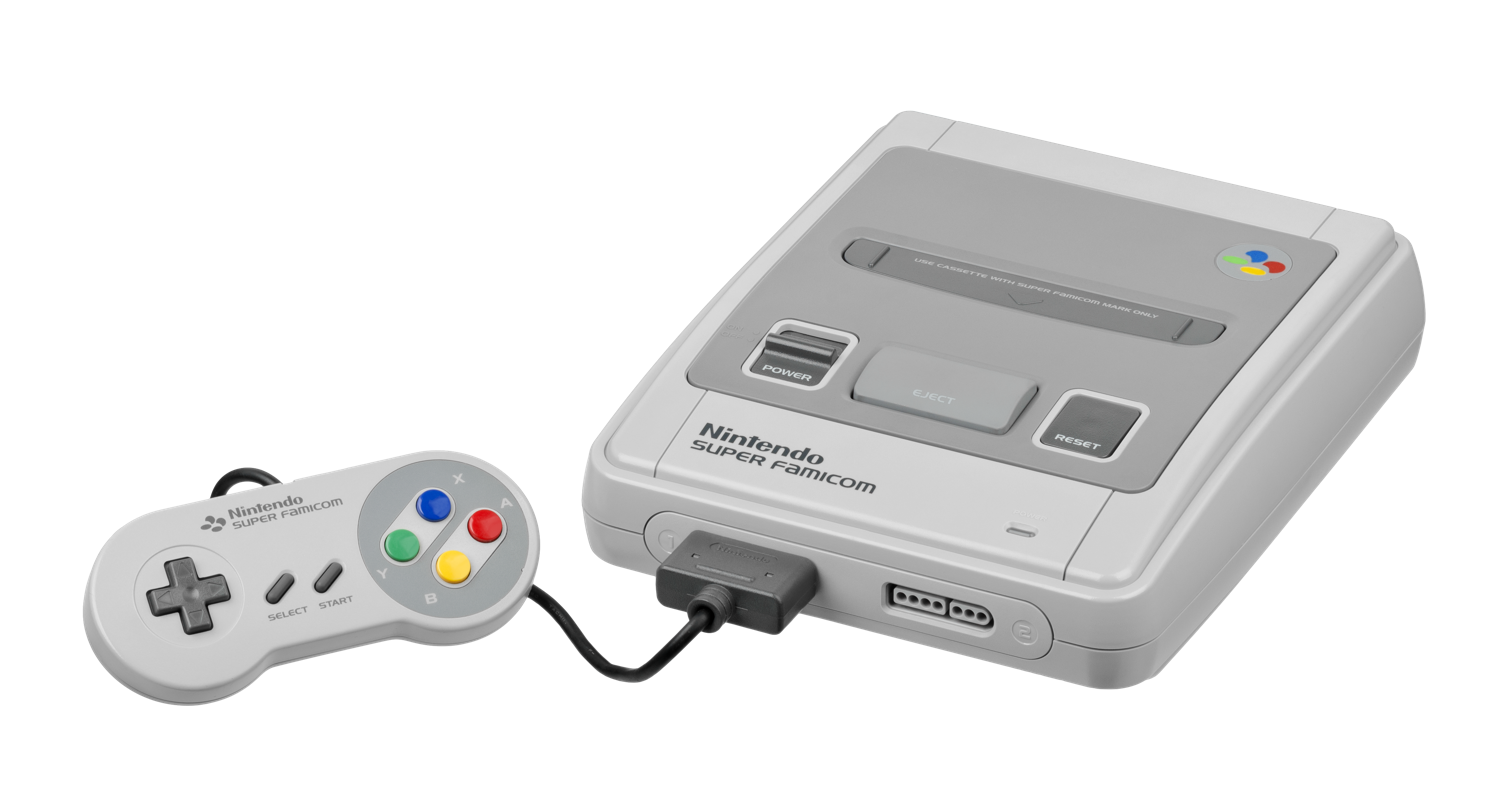
- Top: North American Super NES Control Deck with controller Middle: PAL-region Super NES Control Deck with controller Bottom: Japanese Super Famicom main unit with controller
- Also known as: SNES; Super NES; Super Nintendo; KOR: Super Comboy
- Developer: Nintendo R&D2
- Manufacturer: Nintendo
- Type: Home video game console
- Generation: Fourth
- Released: November 21, 1990: JP: November 21, 1990; NA: August 23, 1991 (Note: Kent says that September 1 was planned but later rescheduled to September 9. Newspaper and magazine articles from late 1991 report that the first shipments were in stores in some regions on August 23, and it arrived in other regions at a later date. August 23 is also the release date officially recognized by Nintendo of America.); FR/GB/IE: April 11, 1992; EU: June 1992; CHL: June 8, 1992; AU: July 3, 1992; DE: August 15, 1992; BR: August 30, 1993; RU: November 15, 1994
- Introductory price: ¥25,000 (equivalent to ¥30,000 in 2024); US$199 (equivalent to $470 in 2025)
- Discontinued: EU: 1998; NA: 1999; BR: 2003; KOR: April 1, 2003; JP: September 25, 2003
- Units sold: Worldwide: 49.10 million; North America: 23.35 million; Japan: 17.17 million; Other: 8.58 million
- Media: Super NES Game Pak
- CPU: Ricoh 5A22 @ 3.58 MHz
- Memory: 128 KB "work" RAM; 64 KB SRAM; 64 KB PSRAM
- Display: 256 × 224, 512 × 224, 512 × 448
- Graphics: S-PPU1 and S-PPU2
- Sound: Nintendo S-SMP
- Online services: JP: Satellaview; JP/NA: XBAND; GB: BT Interactive TV (Trial)
- Best-selling game: Pack-in: Super Mario World (20.6 million); Standalone: Street Fighter II: The World Warrior (6.3 million) (list)
- Predecessor: Nintendo Entertainment System
- Successor: Nintendo 64

The Super Nintendo Entertainment System (Super NES or SNES) (Note: Often referred to as the Super Nintendo, though Nintendo of America's official guidelines discourage the use of this shorthand in favor of "Super NES", as written on many of its products such as Super NES Control Deck, Super NES Controller, Super NES Mouse, and Super NES Multi-Player Adapter.) (Note: The name "SNES" can be pronounced by English speakers as an acronym (one word, like "NATO") with various pronunciations, an initialism (a string of letters, like "IBM"), or as a hybrid, like "JPEG". In written English, the choice of indefinite article ("a" or "an") is therefore problematic.) is a home video game console developed and marketed by Nintendo. It was released as the Super Famicom (Note: Japanese: スーパーファミコン, Hepburn: Sūpā Famikon; officially adopting the abbreviated name of its predecessor, the Famicom) (SFC) in Japan on November 21, 1990, as the Super NES in North America on August 23, 1991, and internationally throughout 1992. It was Nintendo's second programmable home console, following the Nintendo Entertainment System (NES). A fourth-generation console, the SNES primarily competed with the Sega Genesis in the console war, a fierce battle for market share in the United States and Europe.

Masayuki Uemura, a Nintendo engineer, designed the 16-bit SNES in response to the introduction of the Genesis and NEC's TurboGrafx-16. The SNES had advanced graphical and sound capabilities compared to its competitors, with features such as Mode 7 to simulate 3D perspective and eight-channel ADPCM audio. Its CPU was designed to accommodate ongoing technological innovations by allowing it to interface with enhancement chips, such as Super FX, integrated into game cartridges. Its controller built on the NES's with additional face buttons and two shoulder buttons. Nintendo released many accessories, including the Super Game Boy adapter to play Game Boy games and the Japan-exclusive Satellaview modem peripheral.

Nintendo released the SNES with Super Mario World (1990) as a pack-in game. It introduced the SNES relatively late in the fourth generation amidst intense competition with Sega, which positioned the Genesis as the preferable console for adolescents through aggressive youth marketing. Nonetheless, the SNES quickly became a success, helped by Nintendo's retention of key third-party developers such as Capcom, Enix, Konami, and Square. Over 1,700 SNES games were released, and Nintendo loosened its previously strict licensing requirements to better compete with Sega. The release of Donkey Kong Country (1994) helped maintain the SNES's popularity into the 32-bit era. Nintendo sold 49.1 million SNESs, making it the best selling fourth-generation home console.

Nintendo released a successor, the Nintendo 64, on June 23, 1996. It discontinued the SNES in 1999 and the Super Famicom on September 25, 2003. Video game journalists regard the SNES as one of the greatest consoles; its library includes acclaimed games such as The Legend of Zelda: A Link to the Past (1991), EarthBound (1994), Final Fantasy VI (1994), Super Metroid (1994), Yoshi's Island (1995), and Kirby Super Star (1996). It remains popular among collectors and retro gamers, and via emulation with applications such as Snes9x and ZSNES. Nintendo has released emulated SNES games through the Virtual Console and Nintendo Classics services and the SNES Classic Edition dedicated console.

== History ==
=== Background ===
In order to compete with the popular Family Computer in Japan, NEC Home Electronics launched the PC Engine on October 30, 1987, and Sega followed suit with the Mega Drive on October 29, 1988. The two platforms were later launched in North America in August 1989 as the TurboGrafx-16 and the Sega Genesis respectively. Both systems were built on 16-bit architectures and offered improved graphics and sound over the 8-bit NES. It took several years for Sega's system to become successful.

Bill Mensch, the co-creator of the 8-bit MOS Technology 6502 microprocessor and founder of the Western Design Center (WDC), gave Ricoh the exclusive right to supply 8-bit and 16-bit WDC microprocessors for Nintendo's new system. Meanwhile, Sony engineer Ken Kutaragi reached an agreement with Nintendo to design the console's sound chip without notifying his supervisors, who were enraged when they discovered the project; although Kutaragi was nearly fired, then-CEO Norio Ohga intervened in support of the project and gave him permission to complete it.

=== Development ===
On September 9, 1987, then-Nintendo president Hiroshi Yamauchi revealed the development of the Super Famicom in the newspaper Kyoto Shimbun. On August 30, 1988, in an interview with TOUCH Magazine, Yamauchi announced the development of Super Mario Bros. 4, Dragon Quest V, three original games, and he projected sales of 3 million units of the upcoming console. In that same interview, Yamauchi pointed out that sales of the Famicom were slowly dropping ever since it hit its peak about two years earlier, and that if they continued supporting it, players would eventually "get bored" and move on in favor of better-quality games, which would be "a dangerous situation" for them. Famicom Hissyoubon magazine speculated that Yamauchi's early announcement was probably made to forestall Christmas shopping for the PC Engine, and relayed Enix's clarification that it was waiting on sales figures to select either PC Engine or Super Famicom for its next Dragon Quest game. The magazine and Enix both expressed a strong interest in networking as a standard platform feature. A prototype was demonstrated to the Japanese press on November 21, 1988, and again on July 28, 1989, which only had 32 KB of work RAM. During the second demonstration, Nintendo also announced that they were forced to delay the release of the Super Famicom to the fall of 1990, as a result of problems such as a distinct lack of software for third-party developers and a global chip shortage – due to a new generation of semiconductor and chip technology that forced manufacturers to split production capacity, which also drove prices up considerably.

The final design of the Super Famicom unveiled at the second Shoshinkai show, which was held between August 28–29, 1990. This included late prototypes of Super Mario World and F-Zero. The demonstration garnered positive results by the public in terms of gameplay. It gained so much popularity that Nintendo received 1.5 million pre-orders for the Super Famicom from wholesalers, making them worried that launch day would get a little chaotic. To solve this, they encouraged retailers to install a reservation system when selling the console. On November 20, the day before launch, Nintendo loaded 100 trucks with boxes of Super Famicom consoles, alongside cartridges of F-Zero and Super Mario World early in the morning. In that same day, Nintendo executed "Operation: Midnight Shipping" by sending these orders late at night, in the hopes of warding off thieves.

=== Launch ===
The four-color mark is part of the logo in the Japanese and PAL regions, with colors corresponding to those of the control pad buttons. The North American logo has a striped background outlining four oval shapes.

Designed by Masayuki Uemura, the designer of the original Famicom, the Super Famicom was released in Japan on November 21, 1990, for ¥25,000 (equivalent to ¥30,265 in 2024). It was an instant success. Nintendo's initial shipment of 300,000 units sold out within hours. This gained the attention of the yakuza criminal organizations, so the devices were shipped at night to avoid robbery.

With the Super Famicom quickly outselling its rivals, Nintendo reasserted itself as the leader of the Japanese console market. Nintendo's success was partially due to the retention of most of its key third-party developers, including Capcom, Konami, Tecmo, Square, Koei, and Enix.

Nintendo released the Super Nintendo Entertainment System, a redesigned version of the Super Famicom, in North America for US$199 (equivalent to $470 in 2025). It began shipping in limited quantities on August 23, 1991, with an official nationwide release date of September 9, 1991. The SNES was released in the United Kingdom and Ireland in April 1992 for £150 (equivalent to £330 in 2025).

Most of the PAL region versions of the console use the Japanese Super Famicom design, except for labeling and the length of the joypad leads. The Playtronic SNES in Brazil, although PAL-M, uses the North American design. Both the NES and SNES were released in Brazil in 1993 by Playtronic, a joint venture between the toy company Estrela and consumer electronics company Gradiente.

The SNES and Super Famicom launched with few games, but these games were well received. In Japan, only two games were initially available: Super Mario World and F-Zero. Bombuzal was released during the launch week. In North America, Super Mario World was launched as a bundle with the console; other launch games include F-Zero, Pilotwings (both of which demonstrate the console's Mode 7 pseudo-3D rendering), SimCity, and Gradius III.

=== Console wars ===
The rivalry between Nintendo and Sega was described as one of the most notable console wars in video game history, in which Sega positioned the Genesis as the "cool" console, with games aimed at older audiences, and aggressive advertisements that occasionally attacked the competition. Nintendo scored an early public-relations advantage by securing the first console conversion of Capcom's arcade hit Street Fighter II for SNES, which took more than a year to make the transition to the Genesis. Though the Genesis had a two-year lead to launch time, a much larger library of games, and a lower price point, it only represented an estimated 60% of the American 16-bit console market in June 1992, and neither console could maintain a definitive lead for several years. Donkey Kong Country is said to have helped establish the SNES's market prominence in the latter years of the 16-bit generation, and for a time, maintain against the PlayStation and Saturn. According to Nintendo, the company had sold more than 20 million SNES units in the U.S. According to a 2014 Wedbush Securities report based on NPD sales data, the SNES outsold the Genesis in the U.S. market by 1.5 million units and gained its lead in the US/North American 16 bit market.

=== Changes in policy ===
During the NES era, Nintendo maintained exclusive control over games released for the system – the company had to approve every game, each third-party developer could only release up to five games per year (but some third parties got around this by using different names, such as Konami's "Ultra Games" brand), those games could not be released on another console within two years, and Nintendo was the exclusive manufacturer and supplier of NES cartridges. Competition from Sega's console brought an end to this practice; in 1991, Acclaim Entertainment began releasing games for both platforms, with most of Nintendo's other licensees following suit over the next several years; Capcom (which licensed some games to Sega instead of producing them directly) and Square were the most notable holdouts.

Nintendo continued to carefully review submitted games, scoring them on a 40-point scale and allocating marketing resources accordingly. Each region performed separate evaluations. Nintendo of America also maintained a policy that, among other things, limited the amount of violence in the games on its systems. The surprise arcade hit Mortal Kombat (1992), a gory fighting game with huge splashes of blood and graphically violent fatality moves, was heavily censored by Nintendo. (Note: In both The Ultimate History of Video Games and Purple Reign: 15 Years of the SNES, the disparity in sales is directly attributed to the Super NES version lacking the excessive blood which was recolored grey and described as "sweat", and lacking some of the more gruesome finishing moves. See the Talk page for details.) Because the Genesis version allowed for an uncensored version via cheat code, it outsold the censored SNES version by a ratio of nearly three to one.

U.S. Senators Herb Kohl and Joe Lieberman convened a Congressional hearing on December 9, 1993, to investigate the marketing of violent video games to children. (Note: Some contend that Nintendo orchestrated the Congressional hearings of 1993, but Senator Lieberman and NOA's Senior Vice President (later Chairman) Howard Lincoln both refute these allegations.) Though Nintendo took the high ground with moderate success, the hearings led to the creation of the Interactive Digital Software Association and the Entertainment Software Rating Board and the inclusion of ratings on all video games. With these ratings in place, Nintendo decided its censorship policies were no longer needed.

=== 32-bit era and beyond ===
While other companies were moving on to 32-bit systems, Rare and Nintendo proved that the SNES was still a strong contender in the market. In November 1994, Rare released Donkey Kong Country, a platform game featuring 3D models and textures pre-rendered on Silicon Graphics workstations. With its detailed graphics, fluid animation, and high-quality music, Donkey Kong Country rivals the aesthetic quality of games that were being released on newer 32-bit CD-based consoles. In the last 45 days of 1994, 6.1 million copies were sold, making it the fastest-selling video game in history to that date. This game conveyed that early 32-bit systems had little to offer over the SNES, and proved the market for the more advanced consoles of the near future. According to TRSTS reports, two of the top five bestselling games in the U.S. for December 1996 are SNES games.

In October 1997, Nintendo released a redesigned model of the SNES (the SNS-101 model referred to as "New-Style Super NES") in North America for US$99 (equivalent to $200 in 2025), with some units including the pack-in game Super Mario World 2: Yoshi's Island. Like the earlier New-Style NES (model NES-101), this is slimmer and lighter than its predecessor, but it lacks S-Video and RGB output, and it is among the last major SNES-related releases in the region. A similarly redesigned Super Famicom Jr. was released in Japan at around the same time. The redesign stayed out of Europe.

Nintendo ceased production of the SNES in North America in 1999, about two years after releasing Kirby's Dream Land 3 (its final second-party game in the US) on November 27, 1997, and one year after releasing Frogger (its final third-party game in the US) in 1998. In Japan, Nintendo continued production of both the Family Computer and the Super Famicom until September 25, 2003, and new games were produced until the year 2000, ending with the release of Metal Slader Glory Director's Cut on November 29, 2000.

Many popular SNES games were ported to the Game Boy Advance, which has similar video capabilities. In 2005, Nintendo announced that SNES games would be made available for download via the Wii's Virtual Console service. On October 31, 2007, Nintendo Co., Ltd. announced that it would no longer repair Family Computer or Super Famicom systems due to an increasing shortage of the necessary parts. On March 3, 2016, Nintendo Co., Ltd. announced that it would bring SNES games to the New Nintendo 3DS and New Nintendo 3DS XL (and later the New Nintendo 2DS XL) via its eShop download service. At the Nintendo Direct event on September 4, 2019, Nintendo announced that it would be bringing select SNES games to the Nintendo Switch Online classic games library, later renamed Nintendo Classics.

== Hardware ==
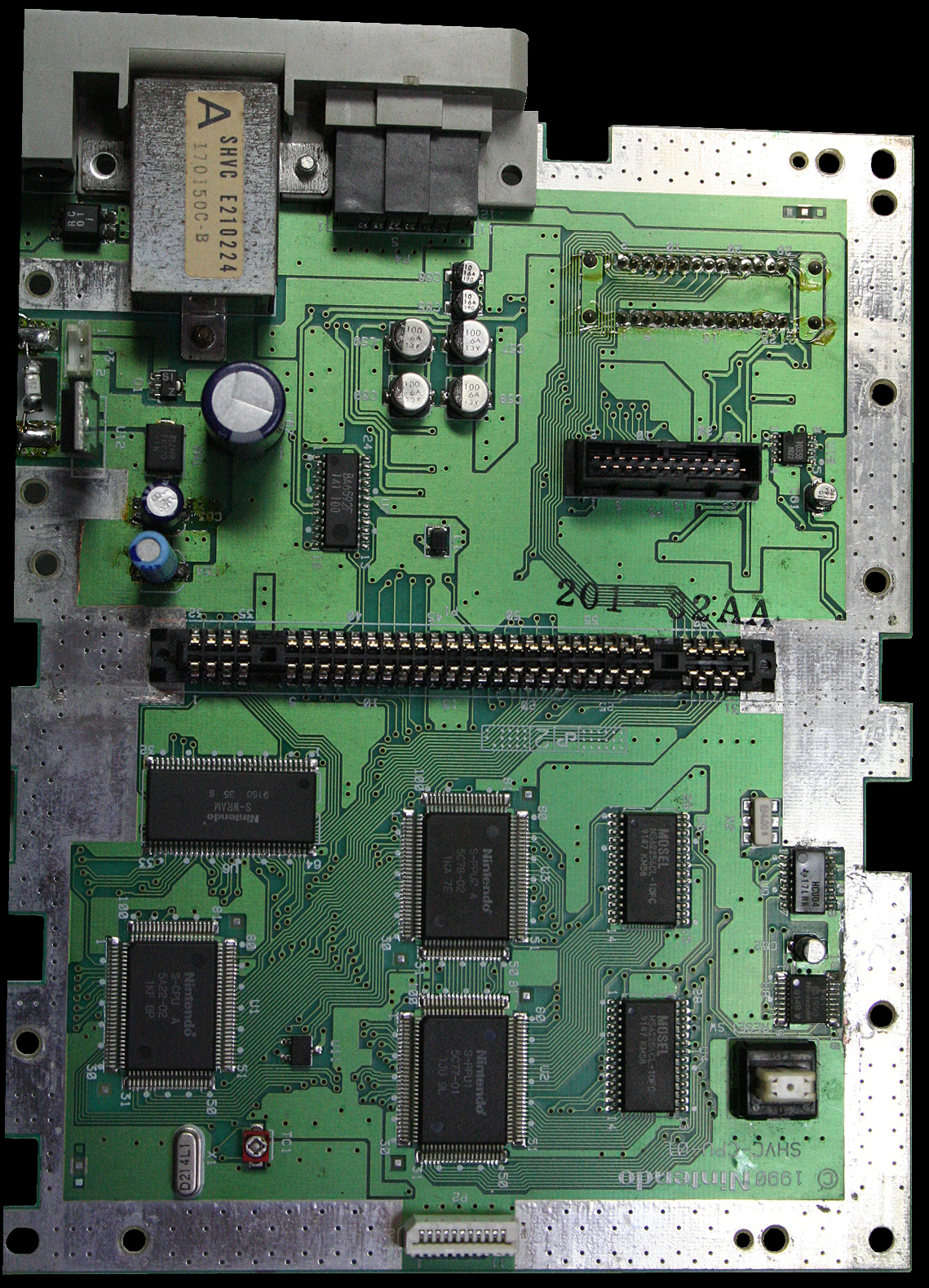
SHVC-CPU-01

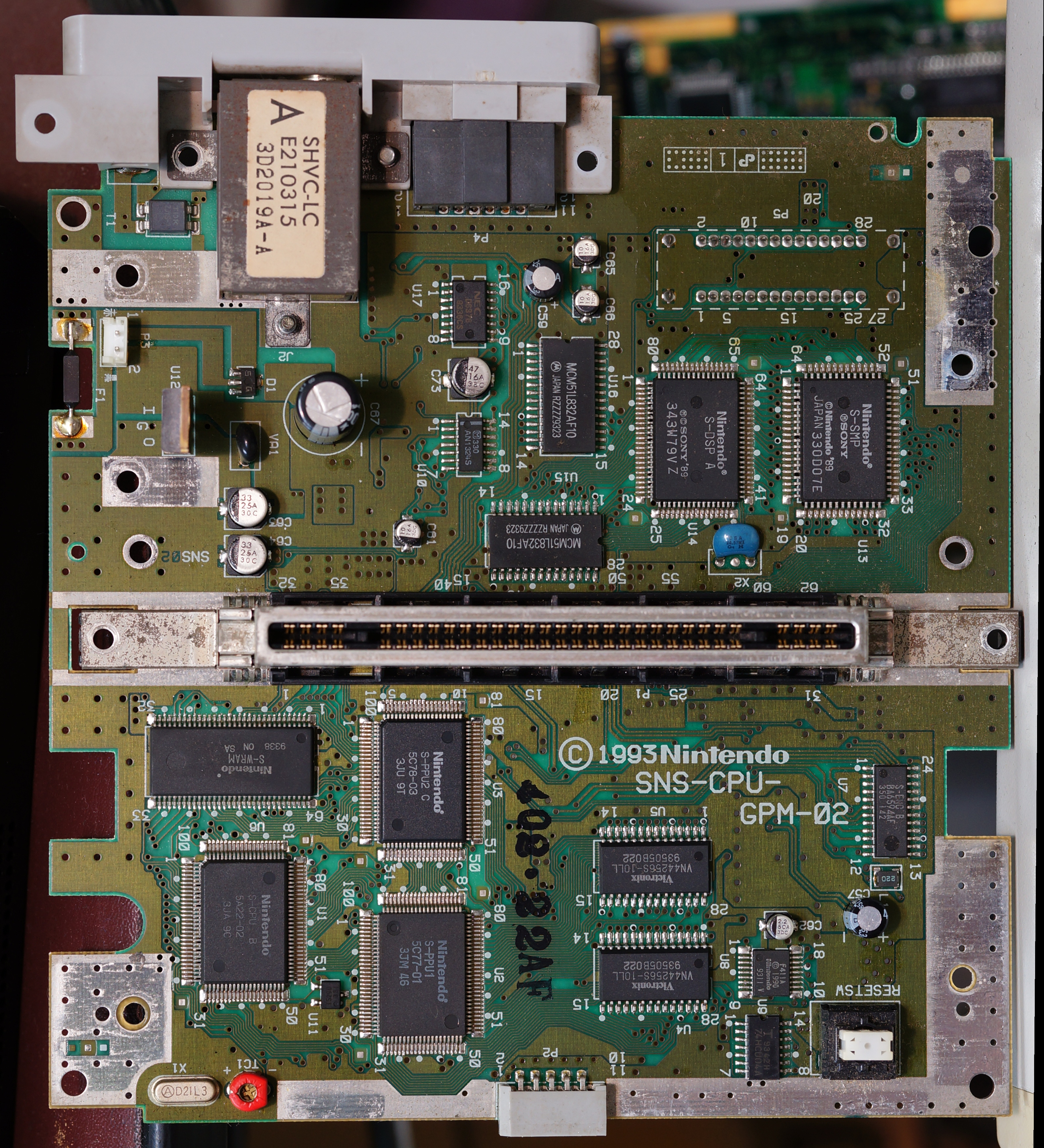
SNS-CPU-GPM-02

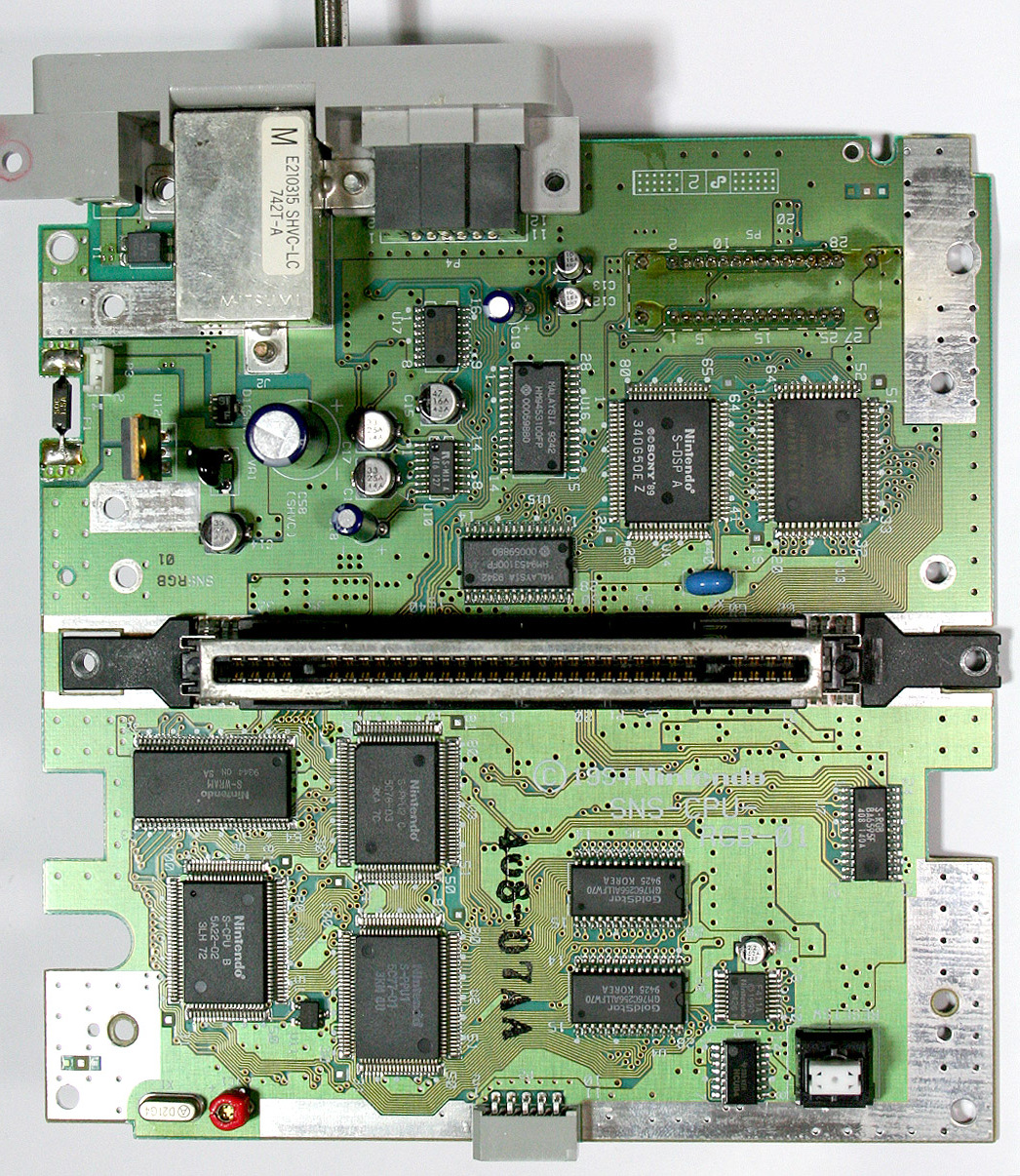
SNS-CPU-RGB-01 (annotated version)

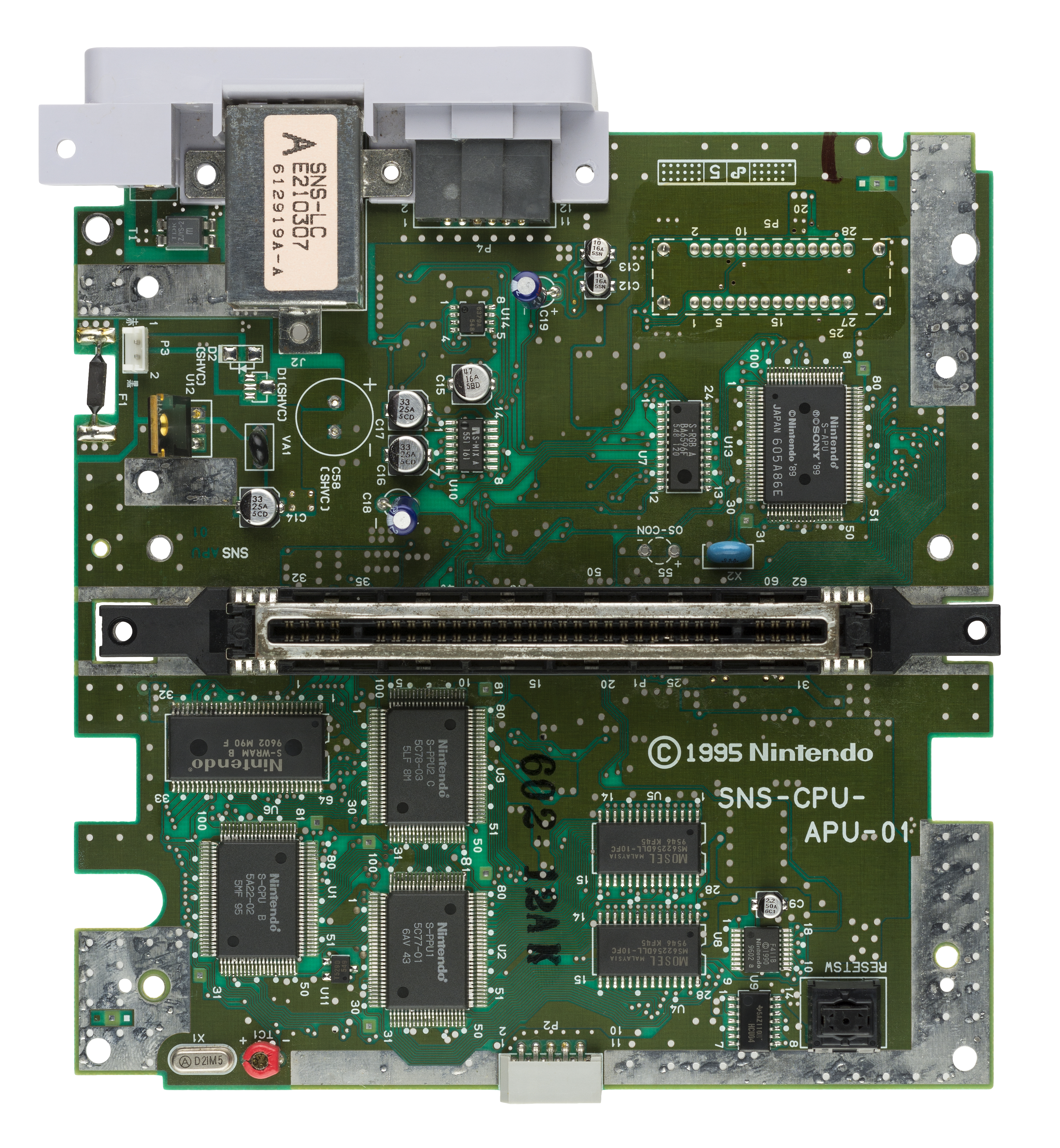
SNS-CPU-APU-01

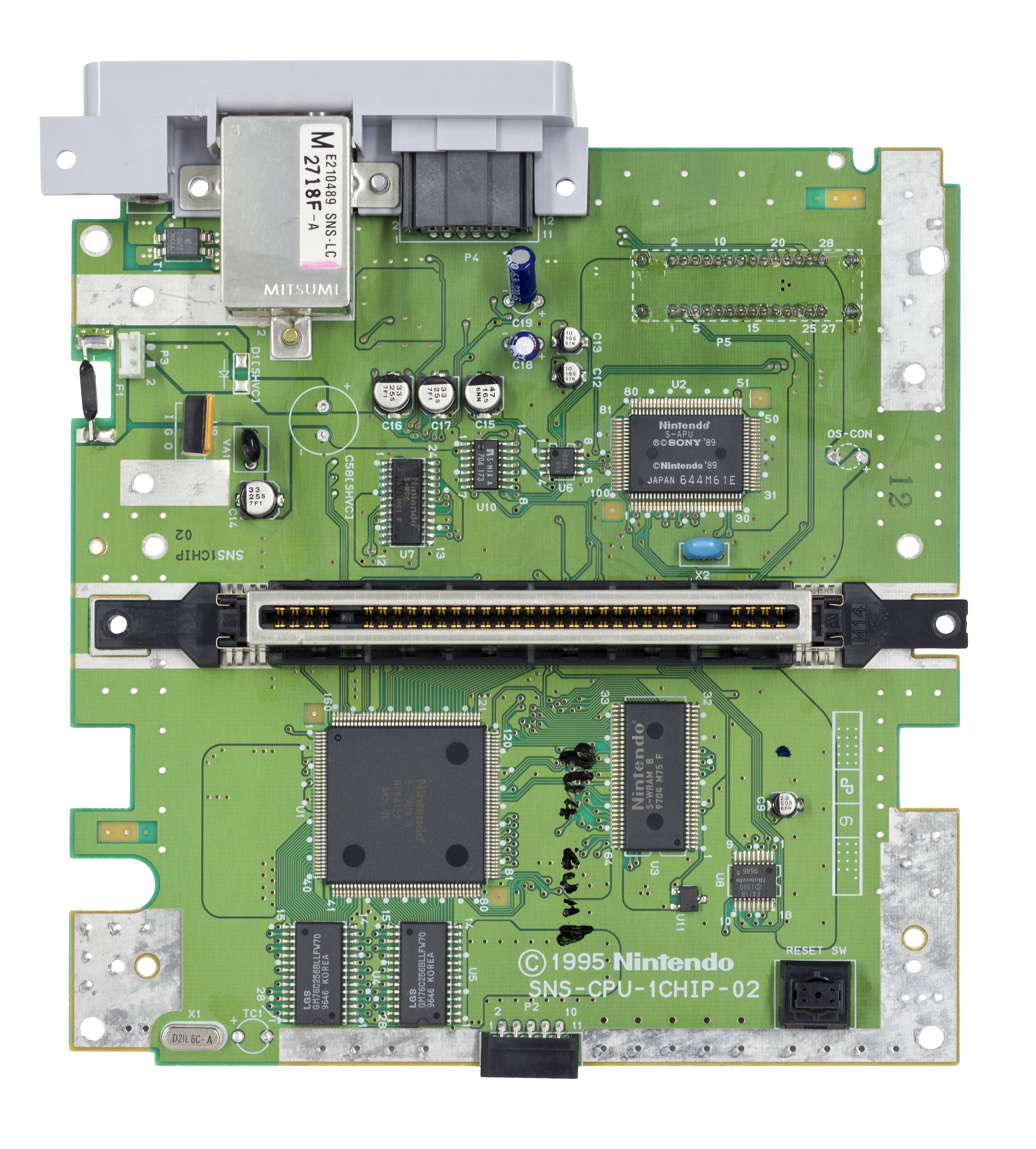
SNS-CPU-1CHIP-02 (annotated version)

=== Technical specifications ===
The 16-bit design of the SNES incorporates graphics and sound co-processors that perform tiling and simulated 3D effects, a palette of 32,768 colors, and 8-channel ADPCM audio. These base platform features, plus the ability to dramatically extend them all through substantial chip upgrades inside of each cartridge, represent a leap over the 8-bit NES generation and some significant advantages over 16-bit competitors such as the Genesis.

==== CPU and RAM ====
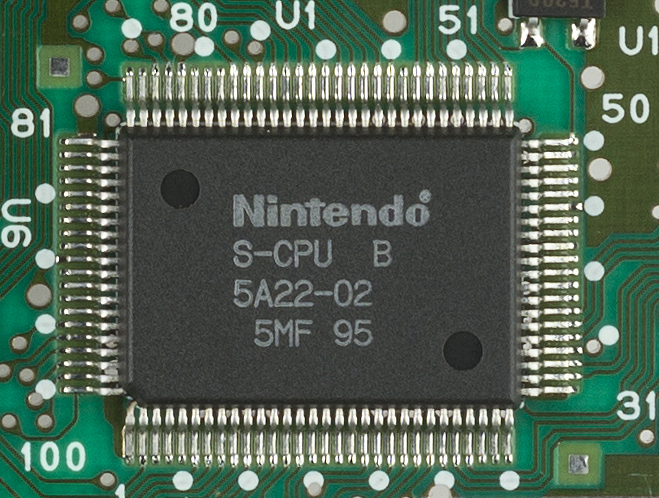
S-CPU, the main CPU of the SNES, a Ricoh 5A22

The CPU is a Ricoh 5A22, a derivative of the 16-bit WDC 65C816 microprocessor. In NTSC regions, its nominal clock speed of 3.58 MHz will slow to either 2.68 MHz or 1.79 MHz when accessing some slower peripherals.

This CPU has an 8-bit data bus and two address busses. The 24-bit "Bus A" is designated for general accesses, and the 8-bit "Bus B" can access support chip registers such as the video and audio co-processors.

The WDC 65C816 supports an 8-channel DMA unit, an 8-bit parallel I/O port, a controller port interface circuit allowing serial and parallel access to controller data, a 16-bit multiplication and division unit, and circuitry for generating non-maskable interrupts on V-blank and IRQ interrupts on calculated screen positions.

Early revisions of the 5A22 used in SHVC boards are prone to spontaneous failure which can produce a variety of symptoms including graphics glitches in Mode 7, a black screen on power-on, or improperly reading the controllers. The first revision 5A22 has a fatal bug in the DMA controller that can crash games; this was corrected in subsequent revisions.

The console contains 128 KB of general-purpose "work" RAM, which is separate from the 64 KB dedicated to the video subsystem and the 64 KB dedicated to the audio subsystem.

==== Video ====
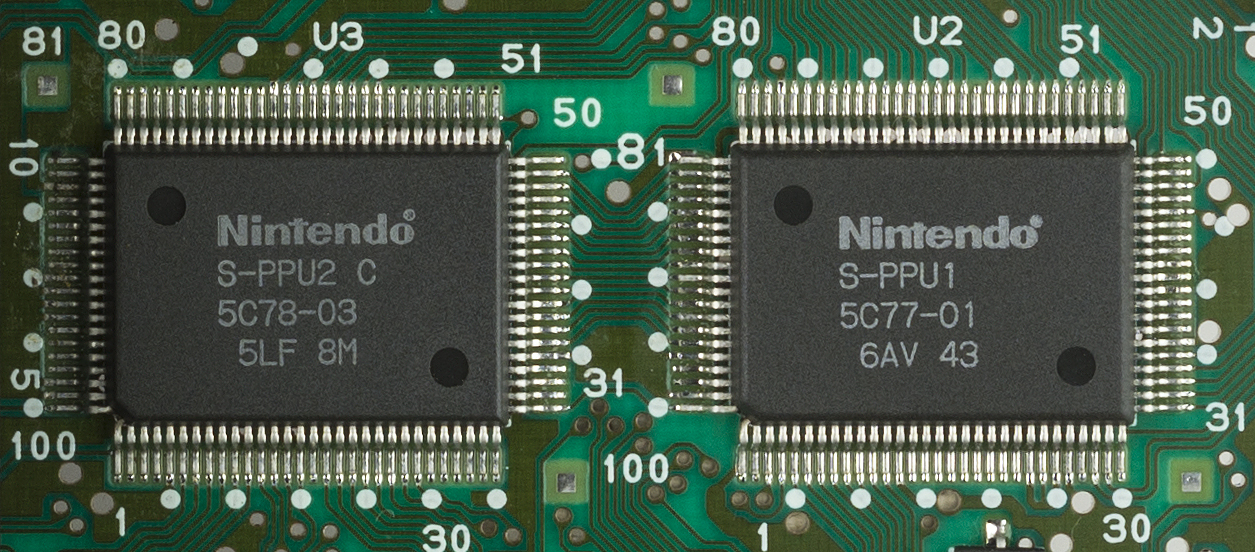
The two Picture Processing Unit (PPU) chips

The Picture Processing Unit (PPU) consists of two closely tied IC packages. It contains 64 KB of SRAM for video data, 544 bytes of object attribute memory (OAM) for sprite data, and 256 × 15 bits of color generator RAM (CGRAM) for palette data. This CGRAM provisions up to 256 colors, chosen from the 15-bit RGB color space, from a palette of 32,768 colors. The PPU is clocked by the same signal as the CPU and generates a pixel every two or four cycles.

==== Audio ====
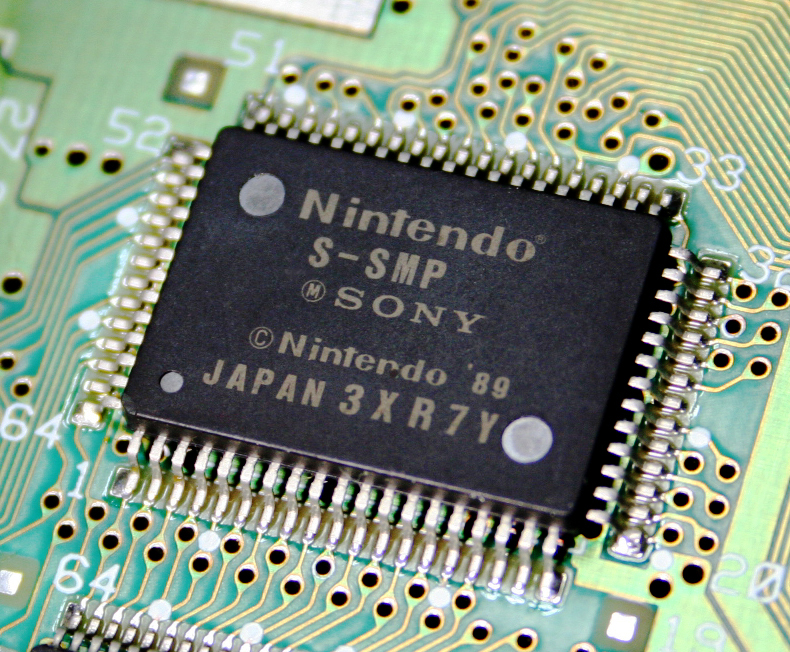
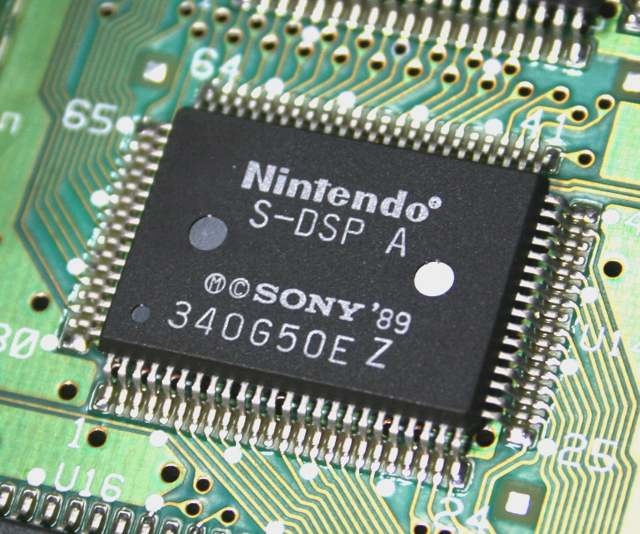
The two main audio chips, from left: the S‑SMP CPU and the S‑DSP digital signal processor

The S-SMP audio subsystem consisted of a 16-bit digital signal processor (DSP) to mix the sample sequences, an 8-bit SPC700 CPU to drive the DSP, and 64 KB of dedicated PSRAM. It was designed by Ken Kutaragi and produced by Sony and is completely independent from the rest of the system. It is clocked at a nominal 24.576 MHz in both NTSC and PAL systems. It is capable of stereo sound, composed from eight voices generated using 16-bit audio samples compressed using BRR and capable of applying effects such as echo. On early revisions of the motherboard the S-SMP audio system was spread across four chips: the DSP, the CPU, and two RAM modules. On later revisions, the sound hardware consolidated to a single chip, the S-APU.

=== Regional lockout ===
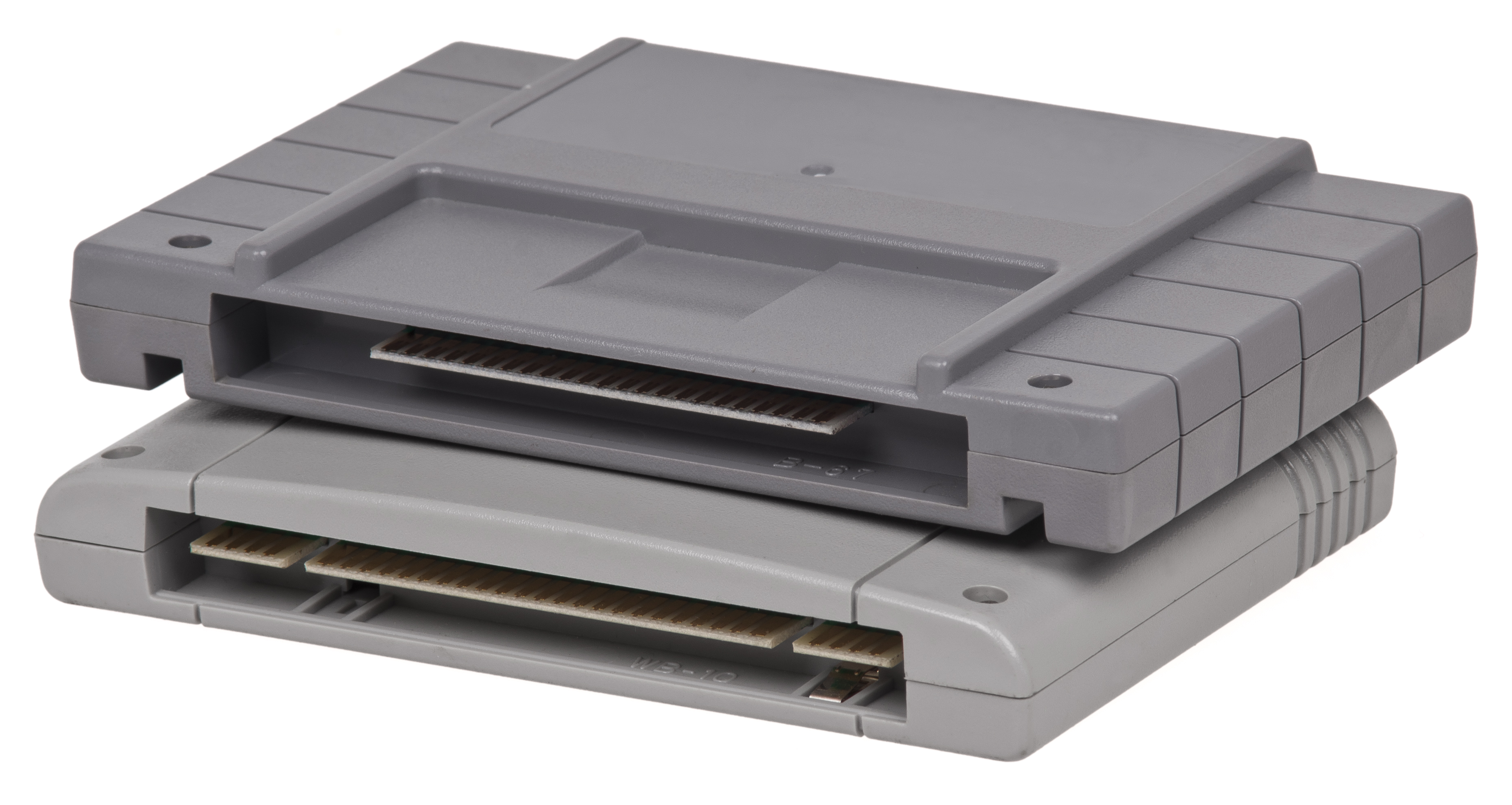
Top: North American cartridge Bottom: Japanese/PAL Super FX-enhanced cartridge

Nintendo employed several types of regional lockout, including both physical and hardware incompatibilities.

Physically, the cartridges are shaped differently for different regions. North American cartridges have a rectangular bottom with inset grooves matching protruding tabs in the console, and other regions' cartridges are narrower with a smooth curve on the front and no grooves. The physical incompatibility can be overcome with the use of various adapters, or through modification of the console.

Internally, a regional lockout chip (CIC) within the console and in each cartridge prevents the PAL region games from being played on Japanese or North American consoles and vice versa. The Japanese and North American machines have the same region chip. This can be overcome through the use of adapters, typically by inserting the imported cartridge in one slot and a cartridge with the correct region chip in a second slot. Alternatively, disconnecting one pin of the console's lockout chip will prevent it from locking the console; hardware in later games can detect this situation, so it became common to install a switch to reconnect the lockout chip as needed.

PAL consoles face another incompatibility when playing out-of-region cartridges: the NTSC video standard specifies video at 60 Hz but PAL operates at 50 Hz, resulting in an approximately 16.7% slower framerate. PAL's higher resolution results in letterboxing of the output image. Some commercial PAL region releases exhibit this same problem and, therefore, can be played in NTSC systems without issue, but other games will face a 20% speedup if played in an NTSC console. To mostly correct this issue, a switch can be added to place the SNES PPU into a 60 Hz mode supported by most newer PAL televisions. Later games will detect this setting and refuse to run, requiring the switch to be thrown only after the check completes.

=== Casing ===
Super NES control deck variants
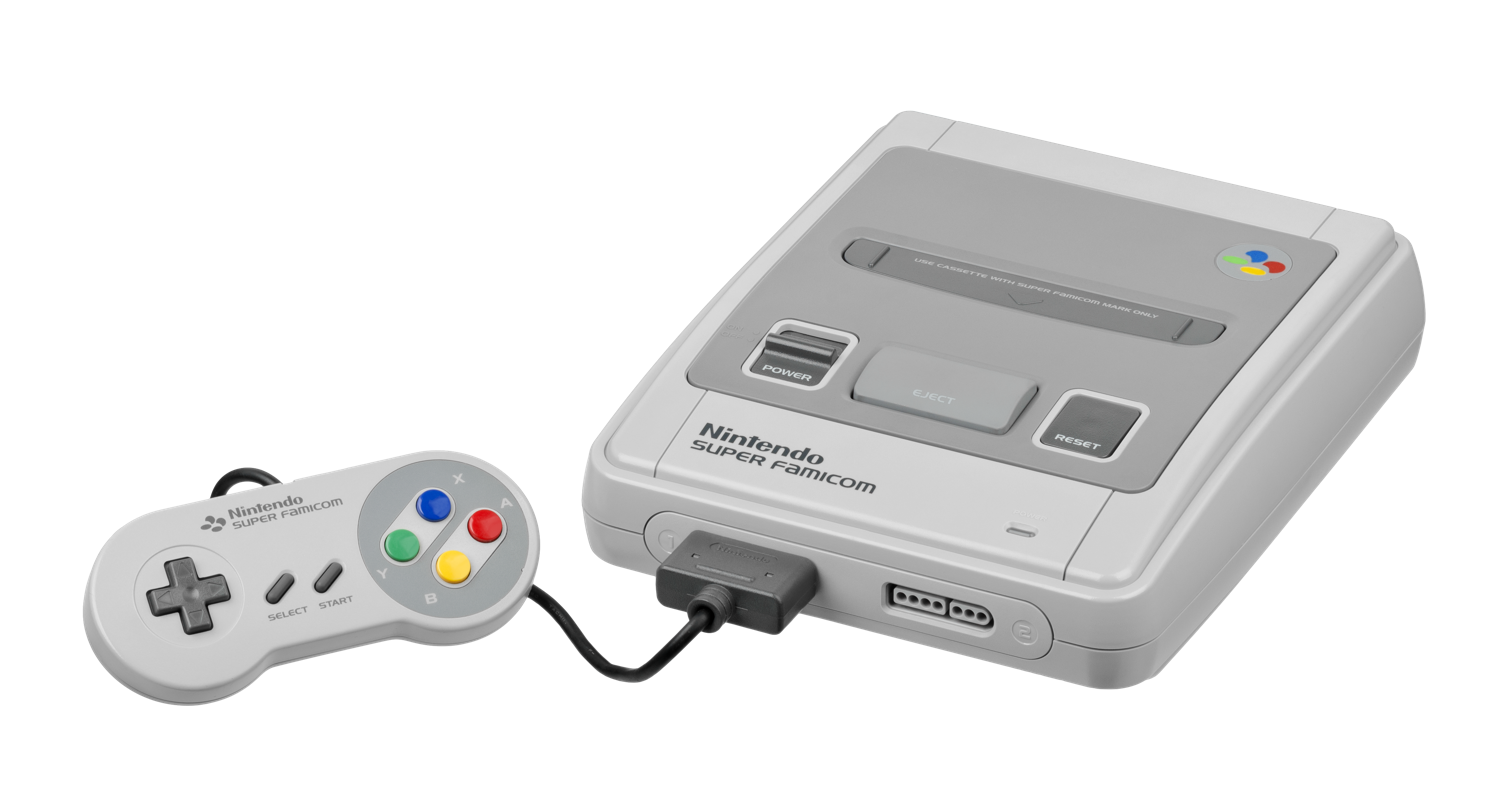
Japanese SHVC-001 model
(1990–1998)

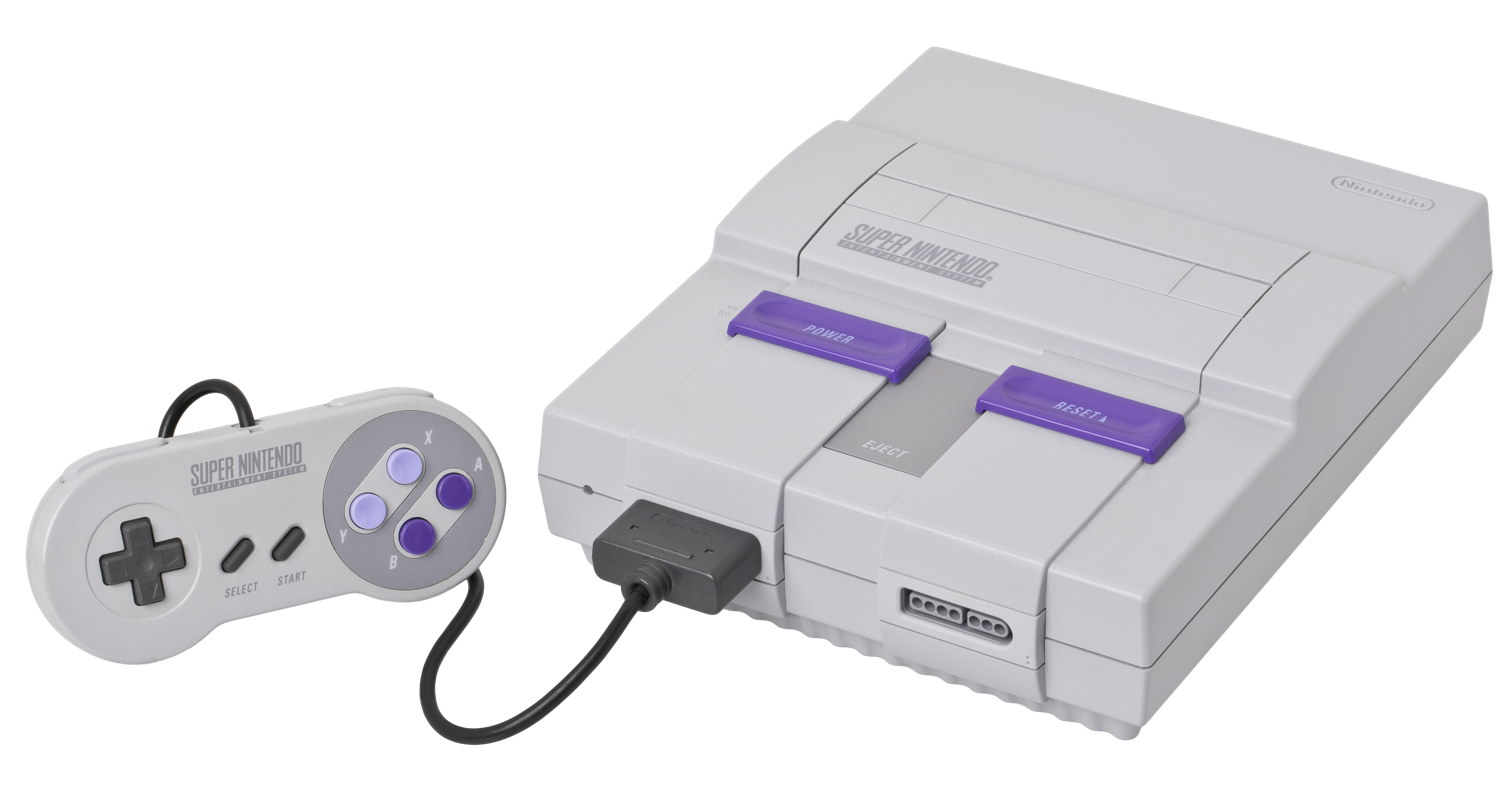
North American SNS-001 model
(1991–1997)

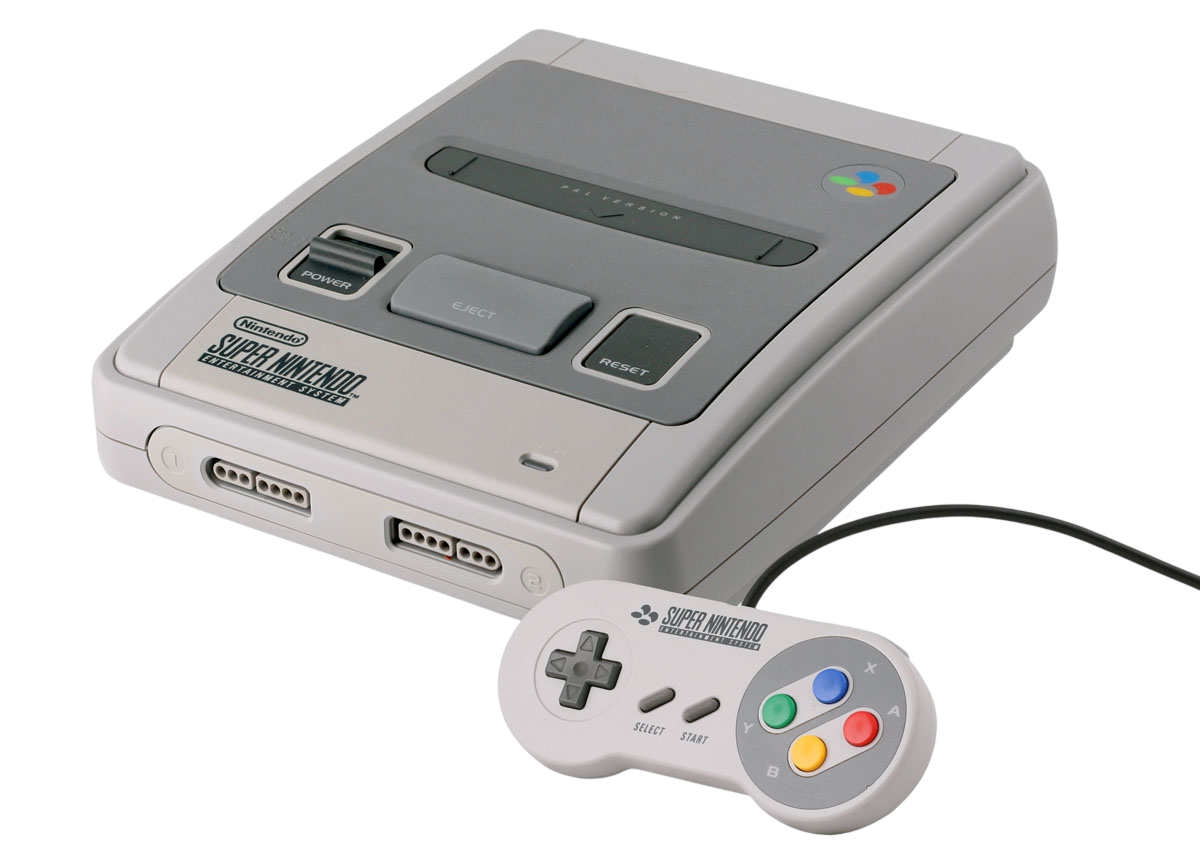
PAL-region SNSP-001A model
(1992–1998)

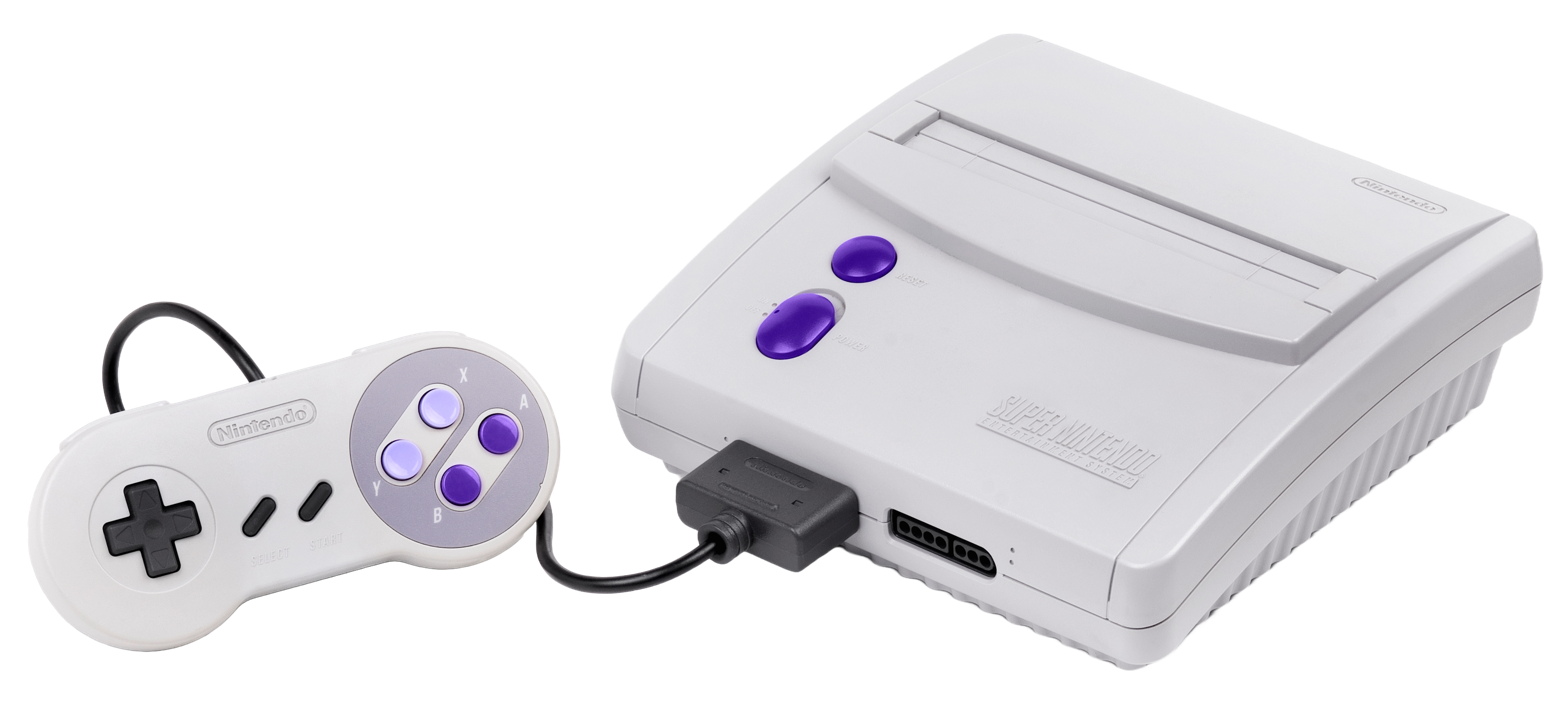
New-Style Super NES SNS-101
(1997–1999)

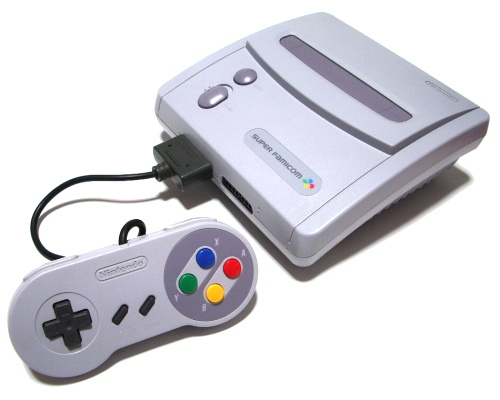
Japanese SHVC-101 model
(1998–2003)

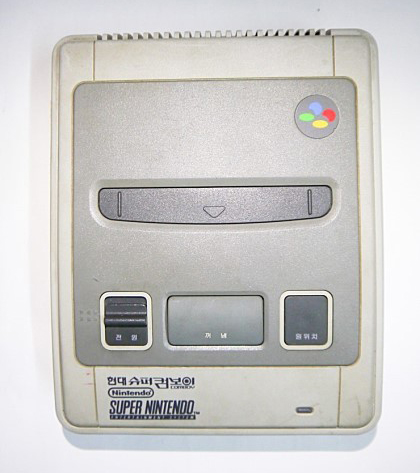
South Korean SNSN-001 model

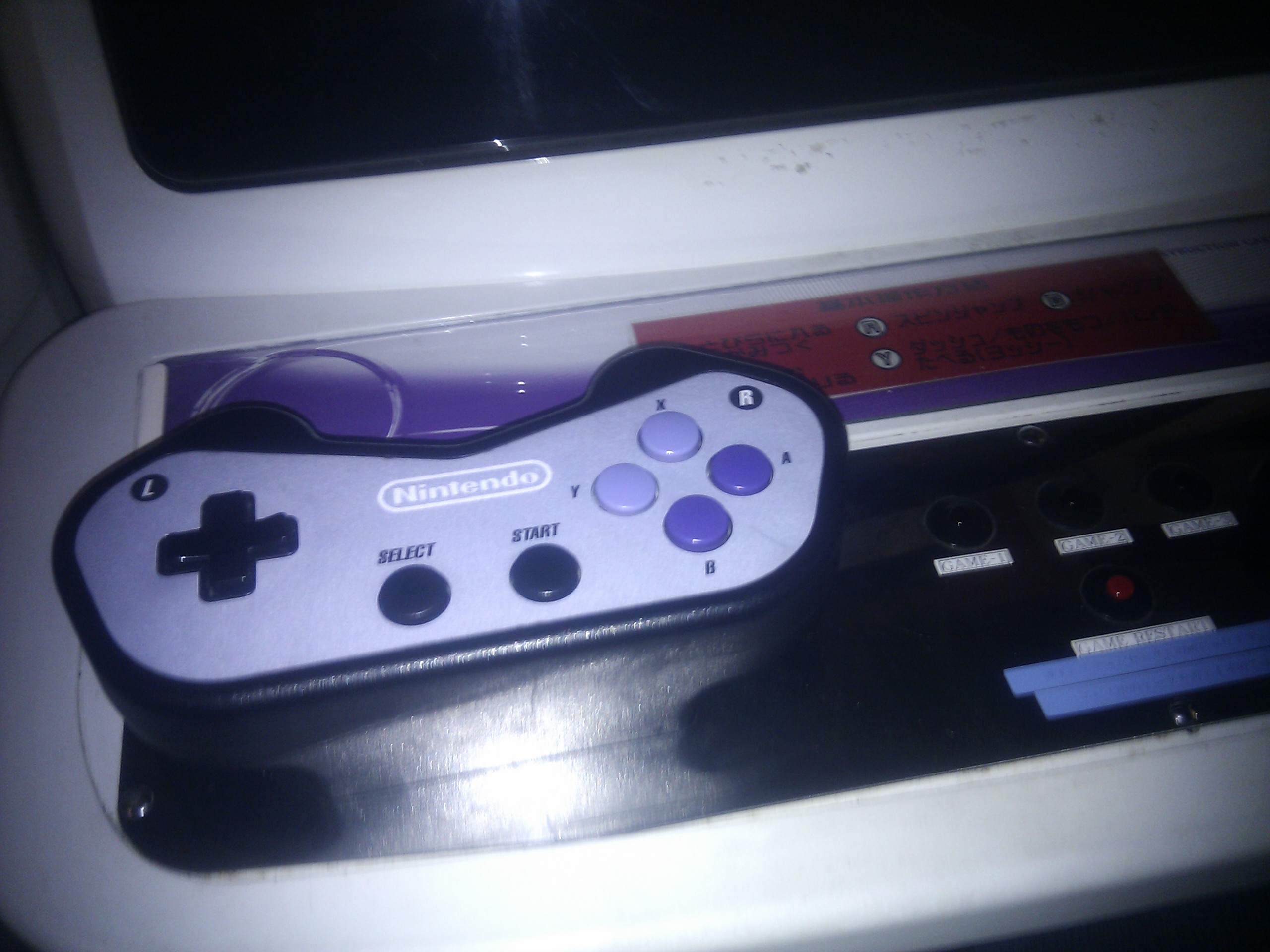
Nintendo Super System controller

All models of the SNES control deck are predominantly gray, of slightly different shades. The North American version, designed by Nintendo of America industrial designer Lance Barr (who previously redesigned the Famicom to become the NES), has a boxy design with purple sliding switches and a dark gray eject lever. The loading bay surface is curved, both to invite interaction and to prevent food or drinks from being placed on the console and spilling as with the flat-surfaced NES. The Japanese Super Famicom, which shares its design with the PAL SNES, is more rounded with darker gray accents and buttons.

All versions incorporate a top-loading slot for game cartridges, although the shape of the slot differs between regions to match the different shapes of the cartridges. The MULTI OUT connector (later used on the Nintendo 64 and GameCube) can output composite video, S-Video and RGB signals, as well as RF with an external RF modulator. Original versions additionally include a 28-pin expansion port under a small cover on the bottom of the unit and a standard RF output with channel selection switch on the back; the redesigned models output composite video only, requiring an external modulator for RF.

The Nintendo Super System (NSS) is an arcade system for retail preview of 11 particular SNES games in the United States, similar to the PlayChoice-10 for NES games. It consists of slightly modified SNES hardware with a menu interface and 25-inch monitor, that allows gameplay for a certain amount of time depending on game credits. Manufacturing of this model was discontinued in 1992.

==== Redesigned model ====
A cost-reduced version of the console, referred to as the New-Style Super NES (model SNS-101) in North and South America and as the Super Famicom Jr. (Note: Japanese: スーパーファミコン ジュニア, Hepburn: Sūpā Famikon Junia) in Japan, was released late in the platform's lifespan; designed by Barr, it incorporates design elements from both the original American and Japanese/European console models but in a smaller form factor. Unlike the original console models, the redesigned model is virtually identical across both regions save for the cartridge slot shape and color palette (the American model receiving purple buttons and the Japanese model receiving grey buttons). The redesign did not receive a release in Europe.

Externally, the power and reset buttons were moved to the left-hand side of the console while the cartridge eject button and power LED indicator were omitted. Internally, the redesigned model consolidates the console's hardware into a system-on-chip (SoC) design. The redesigned console lacks the bottom expansion slot, rendering it incompatible with the Japan-exclusive Satellaview add-on.

For AV output, the redesigned console features the same multi-out port used on the original models. Unlike the latter models, the former's AV port only supports composite video output natively as support for RGB video and S-Video was disabled internally; however, they can be restored via a "relatively simple" modification. The internal RF modulator was also removed, requiring an external one for such output if needed. Due to the SoC design, it is highly sought after by SNES/Famicom enthusiasts since its RGB video quality (if restored) is improved over earlier internal revisions of the console.

The redesigned console first released in October 1997 in North America, where it originally retailed for US$99.95 (equivalent to $200 in 2025) in a bundle with Super Mario World 2: Yoshi's Island; it was subsequently released in Japan on March 27, 1998, where it retailed for ¥7,800 (equivalent to ¥8,600 in 2024). Nintendo marketed it as an entry-level gamer's system for consumers who were apprehensive about the higher price of newer systems such as the Nintendo 64. Nintendo also introduced a slightly altered controller for it, with the console's logo replaced by an embossed Nintendo logo.

==== Yellowing ====
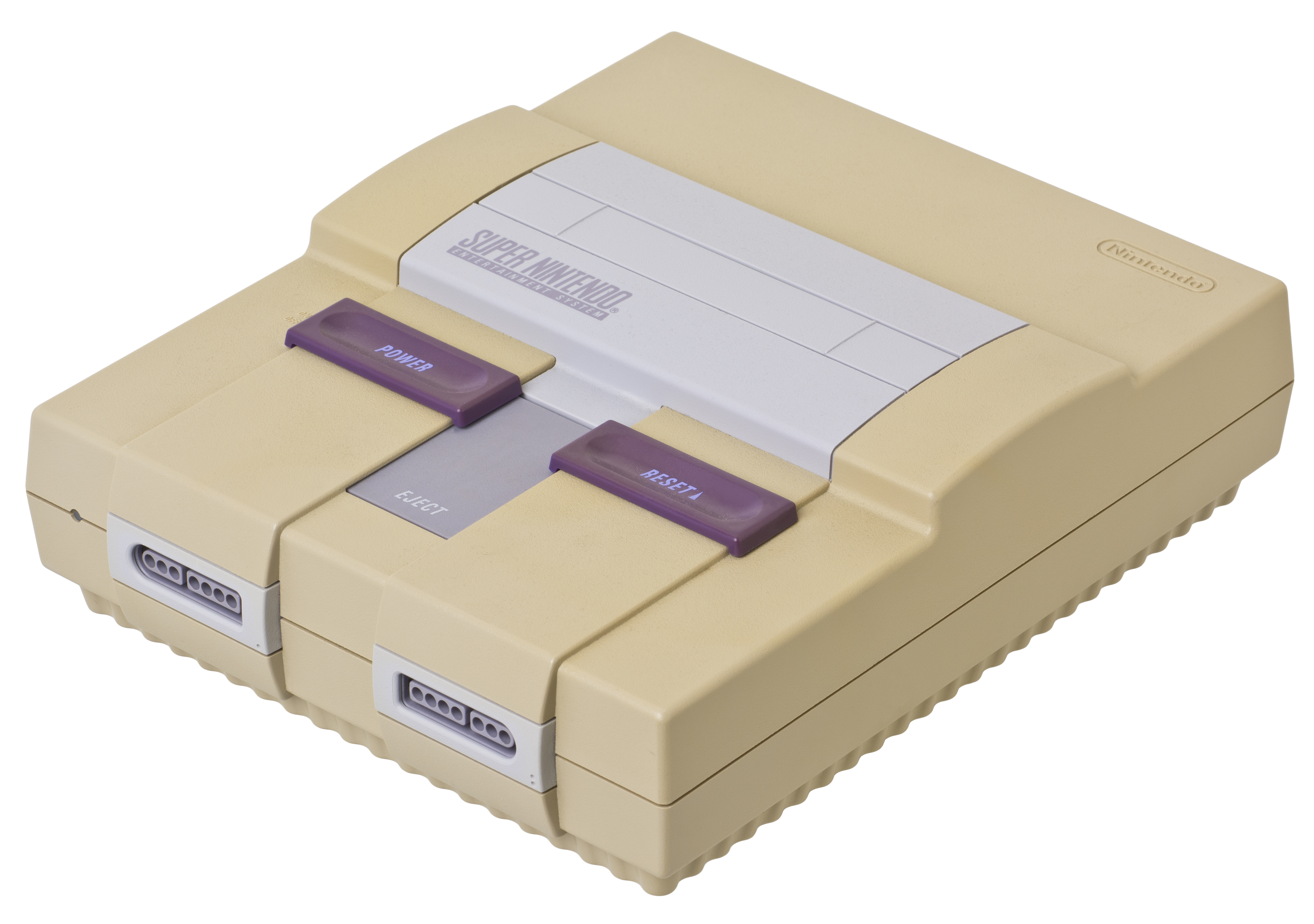
North American SNES plastic casing, yellow with age

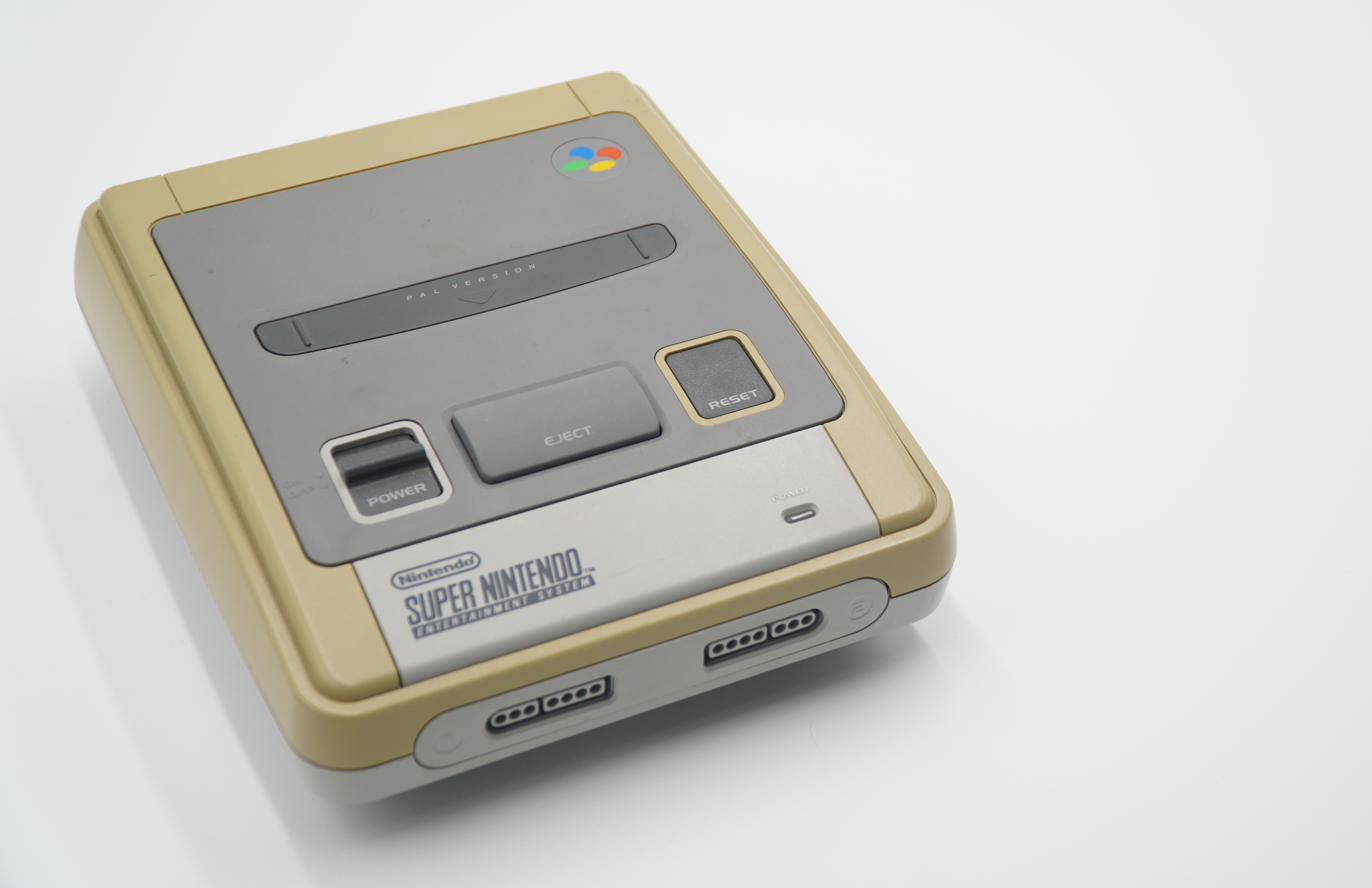
PAL-region SNES plastic casing, yellow with age

The acrylonitrile butadiene styrene plastic used in the casing of some older SNES and Super Famicom consoles is particularly susceptible to oxidation with exposure to air. This, along with the particularly light color of the original plastic, causes affected consoles to quickly become yellow; if the sections of the casing came from different batches of plastic, a "two-tone" effect results. This issue may be reversed with a method called Retrobrighting, where a mixture of chemicals is applied to the case and exposed to UV light.

=== Game cartridge ===
SNES games are distributed on ROM cartridges, officially referred to as Game Pak in most Western regions, and as Cassette (カセット, Kasetto) in Japan and parts of Latin America. Though the SNES can address 128 Mbit, (Note: Unless otherwise specified, kilobyte (KB), megabyte (MB), and megabit (Mbit) are used in the binary sense in this article, referring to quantities of 1024 or 1,048,576.) only 117.75 Mbit are actually available for cartridge use. A fairly normal mapping could easily address up to 95 Mbit of ROM data (48 Mbit at FastROM speed) with 8 Mbit of battery-backed RAM. Most available memory access controllers only support mappings of up to 32 Mbit. The largest games released (Tales of Phantasia and Star Ocean) contain 48 Mbit of ROM data, and the smallest games contain only 2 Mbit.

Cartridges may also contain battery-backed SRAM to save the game state, extra working RAM, custom coprocessors, or any other hardware that will not exceed the maximum current rating of the console.

== Games ==
1757 SNES games were officially released: 717 in North America (plus 4 championship cartridges), 521 in Europe, 1,448 in Japan, 231 on Satellaview, and 13 on Sufami Turbo. Many SNES games have been called some of the greatest video games of all time, such as Super Mario World (1990), The Legend of Zelda: A Link to the Past (1991), Final Fantasy VI (1994), Donkey Kong Country (1994), EarthBound (1994), Super Metroid (1994), Chrono Trigger (1995), Yoshi's Island (1995), and Kirby Super Star (1996). Many SNES games have been rereleased several times, including on the Virtual Console, Super NES Classic Edition, and the Nintendo Classics service on Nintendo Switch Online. All Game Boy games are playable with the Super Game Boy add-on.

== Peripherals ==
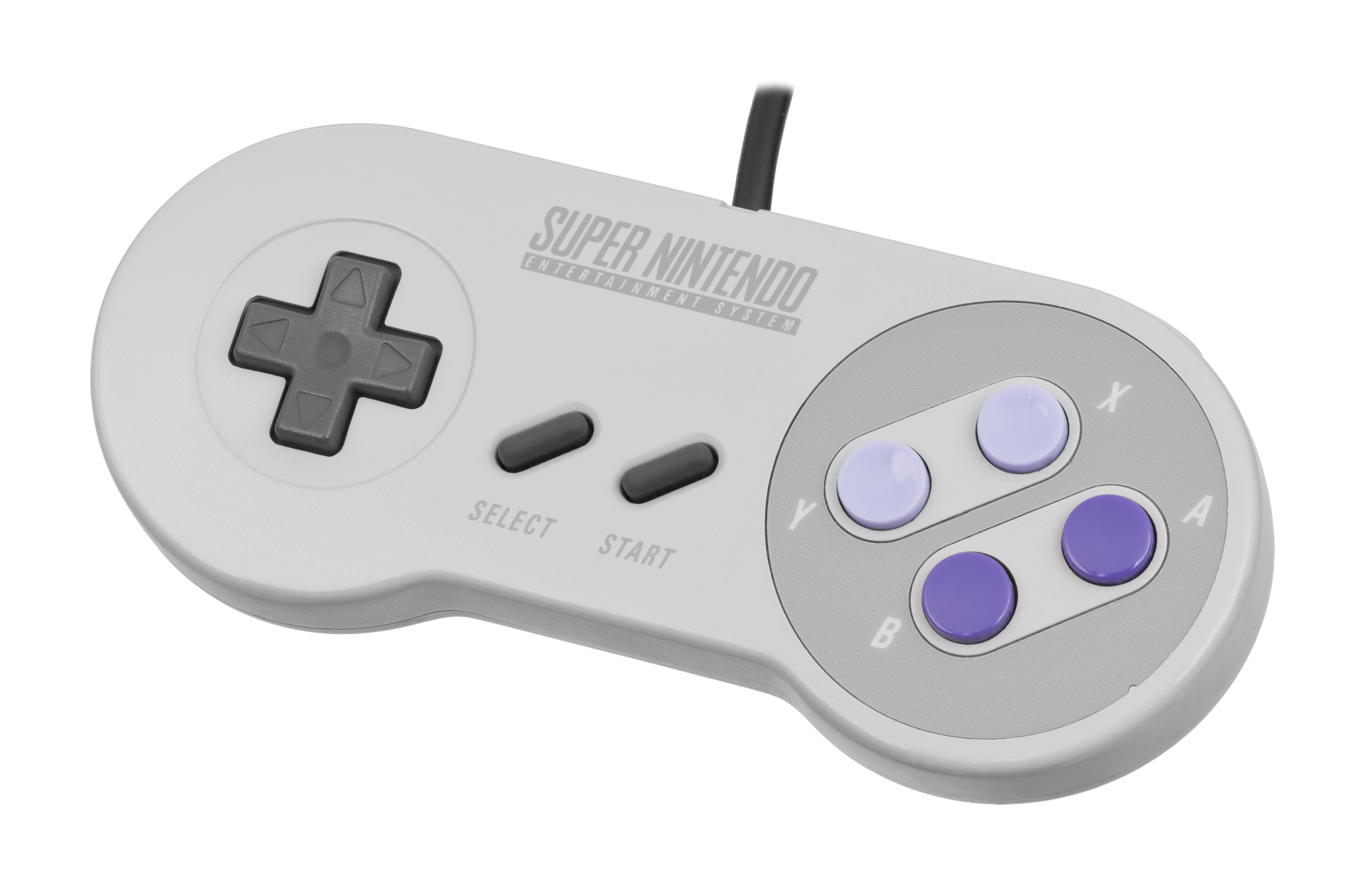
The layout of the SNES controller became the basis for many other controllers.

The SNES controller design expands on that of the NES, with A, B, X, and Y face buttons in a diamond arrangement, and two shoulder buttons. Lance Barr created its ergonomic design, and he later adapted it in 1993 for the NES-039 "dogbone" controller. The Japanese and PAL region versions incorporated the four colors of the face buttons into the system's logo. The North American version's buttons were colored to match the redesigned console; the X and Y buttons are lavender with concave faces, and the A and B buttons are purple with convex faces. Several later controller designs have elements from the SNES controller, including the PlayStation, Dreamcast, Xbox, and Wii Classic Controller. This face button layout is on future Nintendo systems since the Nintendo DS.

Several peripherals add to the functionality of the SNES. Some are required by certain games, such as the Super Scope light gun, and the SNES Mouse for a point and click interface. Hudson Soft released the Super Multitap in conjunction with Super Bomberman, a multi-player adapter for the SNES that allows up to four additional controllers to be connected into the control deck's second controller port for up to five possible simultaneous players in supported titles. Many other peripheral manufacturers would follow suit with their own multi-player adapters for the SNES, both officially licensed and off-brand, such as the Super Links by Bulletproof Software (based on the Hori Multitap by Hori in Japan) and the Super 5-Play by Performance. All SNES titles that support the Super Multitap or its compatible derivatives feature a "Super NES Multi-Player Adapter" logo on their packaging or cartridge label. Japanese Super Famicom titles used a Multiplayer 5 (マルチプレイヤー5) logo instead, which was Nintendo's generic name for the Super Multitap and its compatible derivatives.

Various specialized joypad and joystick controllers were created by third-party companies such as Asciiware (the AsciiPad and the Super Advantage), Capcom (the Capcom Fighter Power Stick and the Capcom Pad Soldier), Hudson Soft (Super Joy Card), Hori (Super Commander and the SGB Commander) and Konami (the Hissatsu Command Controller), among others. Unusual controllers include the Batter Up baseball bat, the Life Fitness Entertainment System (an exercise bike controller with built-in monitoring software), the TeeV Golf golf club, and the Justifier (a revolver-shaped light gun made by Konami for Lethal Enforcers).

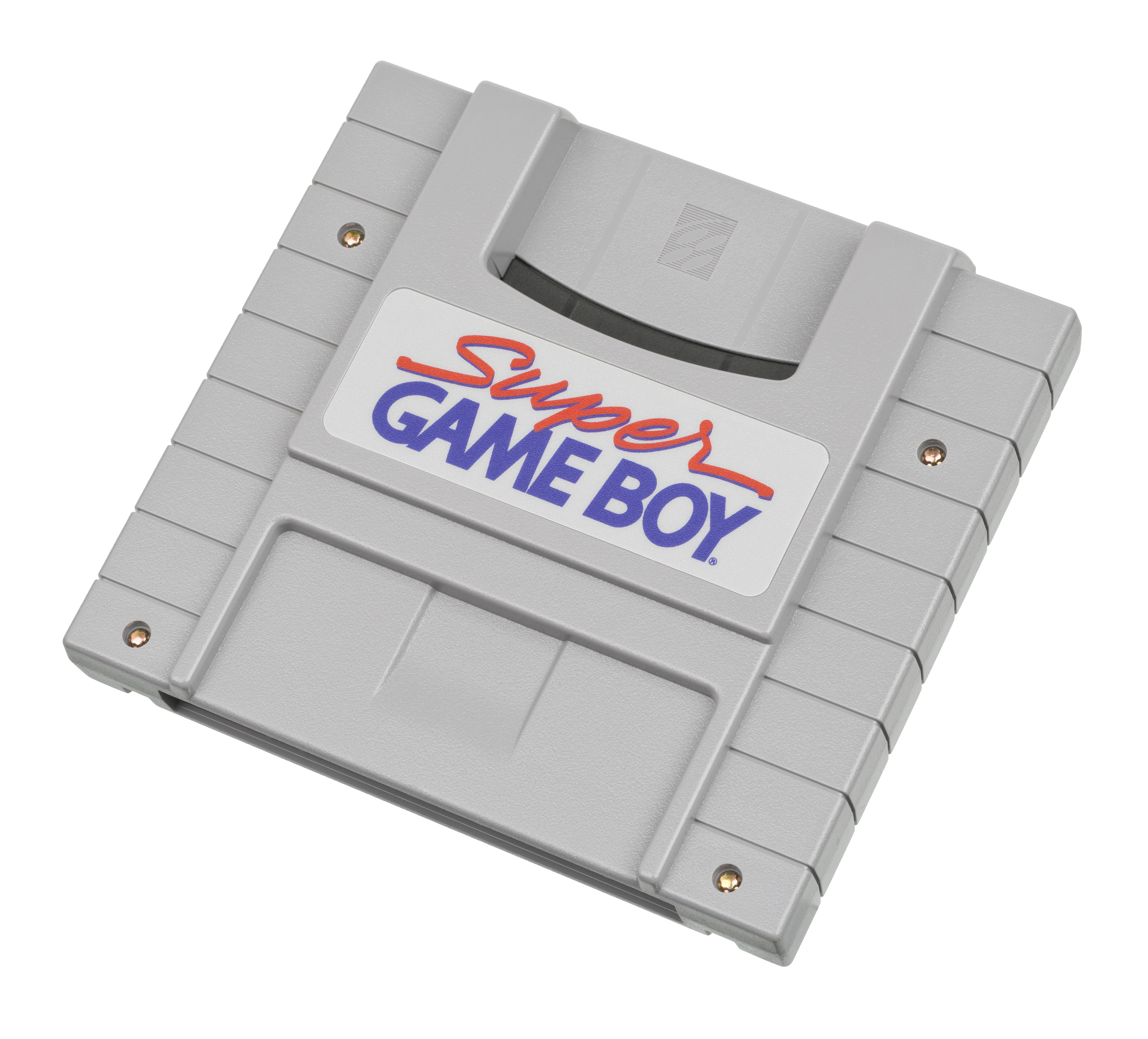
The Super Game Boy cartridge adapts Game Boy games to the SNES.

Though Nintendo never released an adapter for playing NES games on the SNES, the Super Game Boy adapter cartridge allows games designed for Nintendo's portable Game Boy system to be played on the SNES. The Super Game Boy touts several feature enhancements over the Game Boy, including palette substitution, custom screen borders, and access to the SNES console's features by specially enhanced Game Boy games. Japan also saw the release of the Super Game Boy 2, which adds a communication port to enable a second Game Boy to connect for multiplayer games.

Like the NES before it, the SNES has unlicensed third-party peripherals, including a new version of the Game Genie cheat cartridge designed for use with SNES games. One of the most infamous are backup units, such as Super Wildcard, Super Pro Fighter Q, and Game Doctor. Super Wildcard allowed a backup of a catridge to be saved to floppy disk, allowing users to copy games.

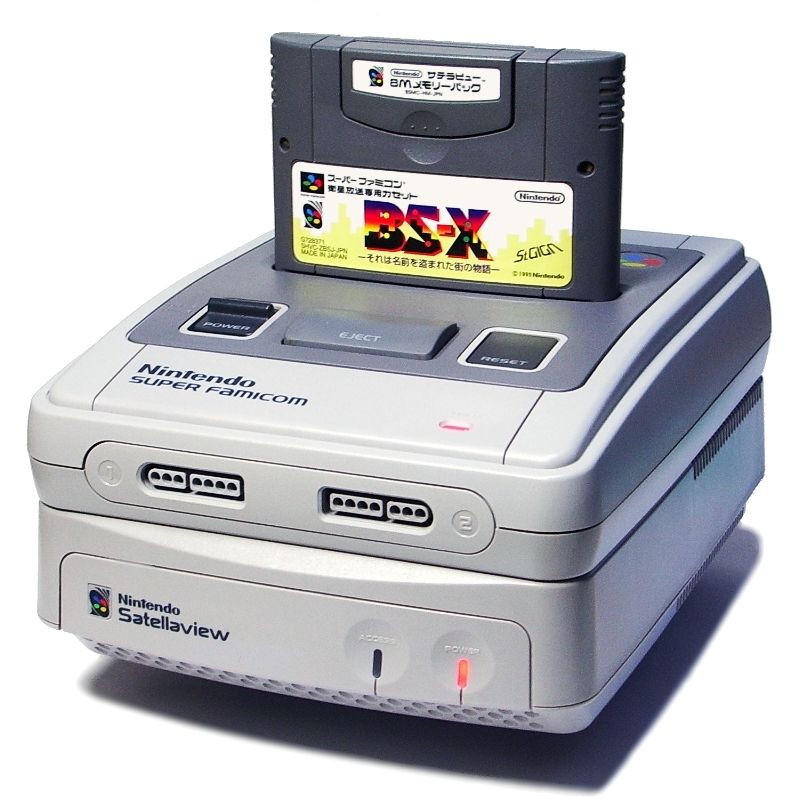
The Satellaview add-on allowed for subscribers of the BS-X service to download games and participate in hosted events with a special adapter.

The Japan-only Satellaview is a satellite modem attached to the Super Famicom's expansion port and connected to the St.GIGA satellite radio station from April 23, 1995, to June 30, 2000. Satellaview subscribers could download gaming news and specially designed games, which were frequently either remakes of or sequels to older Famicom games, and released in installments. In the United States, the relatively short-lived XBAND allowed users to connect to a network via a dial-up modem to compete against other players around the country.

Nintendo attempted partnerships with Sony and later Philips to develop CD-ROM-based peripherals, aiming to compete with add-ons like the TurboGrafx-CD and Sega CD. Sony's effort resulted in a prototype known as the PlayStation, a SNES with a built-in CD-ROM drive, which never reached the market but laid the groundwork for Sony's later independently produced console. The Philips project was canceled before a prototype was produced. However, under the original development agreement, Nintendo had granted Philips the rights to use certain franchises for games intended for the planned peripheral. After the project's cancellation, Philips retained these rights and used them to develop Mario and Zelda titles for its CD-i multimedia system.

== Enhancement chips ==
The Super FX chip allowed Star Fox to have 3D polygonal graphics on the Super Nintendo.

As part of the overall plan for the SNES, rather than include an expensive CPU that would still become obsolete in a few years, the hardware designers made it easy to interface special coprocessor chips to the console, just like the MMC chips used for most NES games. This is most often characterized by 16 additional pins on the cartridge card edge.

The Super FX is a RISC CPU designed to perform functions that the main CPU can not feasibly do. The chip is primarily used to create 3D game worlds made with polygons, texture mapping and light source shading. The chip can also be used to enhance 2D games.

The Nintendo fixed-point digital signal processor (DSP) chip allowed fast vector-based calculations, bitmap conversions, both 2D and 3D coordinate transformations, and other functions. Four revisions of the chip exist, each physically identical but with different microcode. The DSP-1 version, including the later 1A and 1B bug fix revisions, is used most often; the DSP-2, DSP-3, and DSP-4 are used in only one game each.

Similar to the 5A22 CPU in the console, the SA-1 chip contains a 65C816 processor core clocked at 10.7 MHz, a memory mapper, DMA, decompression and bitplane conversion circuitry, several programmable timers, and CIC region lockout functionality.

In Japan, games could be downloaded cheaper than standard cartridges, from Nintendo Power kiosks onto special cartridges containing flash memory and a MegaChips MX15001TFC chip. The chip manages communication with the kiosks to download ROM images and has an initial menu to select a game. Some were published both in cartridge and download form, and others were download only. The service closed on February 8, 2007.

Many cartridges contain other enhancement chips, most of which were created for use by a single company in a few games.

== Reception and legacy ==
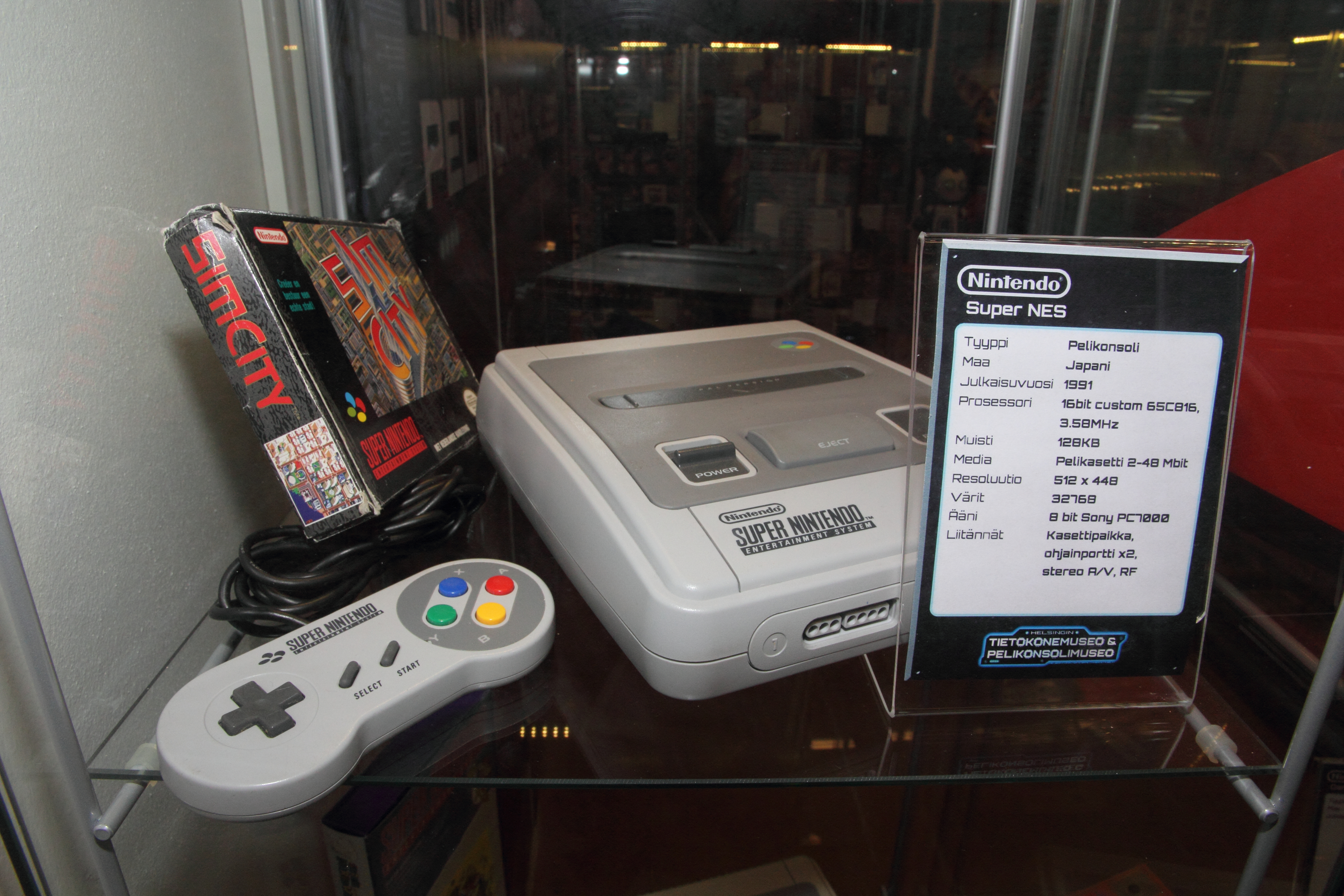
European version of the SNES control deck at the Computer and Video Game Console Museum of Helsinki in 2012

Approximately 49.1 million SNES consoles were sold worldwide, with 23.35 million of those units sold in the Americas and 17.17 million in Japan. Although it could not quite repeat the success of the NES, which sold 61.91 million units worldwide, the SNES was the best-selling console of its era.

In 2007, GameTrailers named the SNES as the second-best console of all time (only behind the PlayStation 2) in their list of top ten consoles that "left their mark on the history of gaming", citing its graphics, sound, and library of top-quality games. In 2015, they also named it the best Nintendo console of all time, saying, "The list of games we love from this console completely annihilates any other roster from the Big N." Technology columnist Don Reisinger proclaimed "The SNES is the greatest console of all time" in January 2008, citing the quality of the games and the console's dramatic improvement over its predecessor; fellow technology columnist Will Greenwald replied with a more nuanced view, giving the SNES top marks with his heart, the NES with his head, and the PlayStation (for its controller) with his hands. GamingExcellence also gave the SNES first place in 2008, declaring it "simply the most timeless system ever created" with many games that stand the test of time and citing its innovation in controller design, graphics capabilities, and game storytelling. At the same time, GameDaily rated it fifth of the ten greatest consoles for its graphics, audio, controllers, and games. In 2009, IGN named the SNES the fourth-best video game console, complimenting its audio and number of AAA games.

=== Emulation ===
SNES emulation began with VSMC in 1994, and Super Pasofami became the first working emulator in 1996. During that time, two competing emulation projects, Snes96 and Snes97, merged to form Snes9x. In 1997, ZSNES development began. In 2004, Bsnes development began with the goal of preservation through maximal accuracy and compatibility, and was later renamed to Higan.

Nintendo of America maintained its stance against the distribution of SNES ROM image files and the use of emulators, as it had with the NES before, saying they represent copyright infringement. Emulation proponents assert that the discontinued hardware production constitutes abandonware status, the owners' right to make a personal backup, space shifting for private use, the development of homebrew games, the frailty of ROM cartridges and consoles, and the lack of certain foreign imports. Nintendo designed a hobbyist development system for the SNES, but never released it.

Unofficial SNES emulation is available on virtually all platforms, including Android, iOS, game consoles, and PDAs. Individual games have been bundled with official dedicated emulators on some GameCube discs, and Nintendo's Virtual Console service for the Wii introduced diverse and officially licensed SNES emulation.

The Super NES Classic Edition was released in September 2017 following the NES Classic Edition. This emulation-based mini-console, which is physically modeled after the North American and European versions of the SNES, is bundled with two SNES-style controllers and 21 games, including the unreleased Star Fox 2.

== Bibliography ==
- Kent, Steven L. (2001). The Ultimate History of Video Games: The Story Behind the Craze that Touched our Lives and Changed the World. Roseville, California: Prima Publishing. ISBN 0-7615-3643-4.
- Sheff, David (1993). Game Over: How Nintendo Zapped an American Industry, Captured Your Dollars, and Enslaved Your Children (First ed.). New York: Random House. ISBN 0-679-40469-4.
