= List of Olympic video games =

The Olympic Games have been featured in numerous sport video games, whether officially licensed by the International Olympic Committee or not. These games often feature several sports and an Olympic theme. Official and unofficial Olympic video games have been released since the 1980 Summer Olympics in Moscow.

== Officially-licensed Olympic video games ==
These games are officially licensed by the International Olympic Committee or an associated organization such as a National Olympic Committee or team.

Video games
Game	Year of release	Publisher	Coinciding Olympics	Refs.
Track & Field	1983	Konami	1984 Summer	
Hyper Sports	1984	Konami	1984 Summer	
The Games: Summer Edition	1988	Epyx	1988 Summer	
The Games: Winter Edition	1988	Epyx	1988 Winter	
Olympic Gold	1992	Tiertex Design Studios	1992 Summer	
Team USA Basketball	1992	Electronic Arts	1992 Summer	
Winter Olympics	1993	Tiertex Design Studios	1994 Winter	
Izzy's Quest for the Olympic Rings	1995	U.S. Gold	1996 Summer	
Olympic Soccer	1996	Silicon Dreams Studio	1996 Summer	
Olympic Summer Games	1996	Tiertex Design Studios	1996 Summer	
Nagano Winter Olympics '98	1998	Konami	1998 Winter	
Olympic Hockey '98	1998	Treyarch	1998 Winter	
Sydney 2000	2000	Attention to Detail	2000 Summer	
Salt Lake 2002	2002	Attention to Detail	2002 Winter	
Athens 2004	2004	Eurocom	2004 Summer	
Torino 2006	2006	49Games	2006 Winter	
Beijing 2008	2008	Sega	2008 Summer	
Vancouver 2010	2010	Sega	2010 Winter	
Sled Shred featuring the Jamaican Bobsled Team	2010	SouthPeak Games	2010 Winter	
London 2012	2012	Sega	2012 Summer	
Steep	2016	Ubisoft	2018 Winter	
Olympic Games Tokyo 2020 - The Official Video Game	2020	Sega	2020 Summer	
Olympic Games Jam: Beijing 2022	2022	nWay	2022 Winter	
Olympics Go! Paris 2024	2024	nWay	2024 Summer	

=== Mario & Sonic series ===
Mario & Sonic is a series of officially-licensed Olympic crossover video games that was jointly developed by Nintendo and Sega, featuring characters from the Mario and Sonic the Hedgehog franchises. The first game in the series was released to coincide with the 2008 Summer Olympics and the final game was released to coincide with the 2020 Summer Olympics. The franchise also has some spinoff mobile games, although none of these feature any Mario characters.

Video games
Game	Year of release	Coinciding Olympics	Refs.
Mario & Sonic at the Olympic Games	2007	2008 Summer	
Sonic at the Olympic Games	2008	2008 Summer	
Mario & Sonic at the Olympic Winter Games	2009	2010 Winter	
Sonic at the Olympic Winter Games	2010	2010 Winter	
Mario & Sonic at the London 2012 Olympic Games	2011	2012 Summer	
Mario & Sonic at the Sochi 2014 Olympic Winter Games	2013	2014 Winter	
Mario & Sonic at the Rio 2016 Olympic Games	2016	2016 Summer	
Mario & Sonic at the Olympic Games Tokyo 2020	2019	2020 Summer	
Sonic at the Olympic Games	2020	2020 Summer	

== Unofficial Olympic video games ==
These games were released without any official involvement of the International Olympic Committee or any related organizations. They may unofficially use the name of the Olympics or may have been released to coincide with the Olympics to attract sports fans.

Video games
Game	Year of release	Publisher	Refs.
Microsoft Decathlon	1980	Microsoft	
The Activision Decathlon	1983	Activision	
Track & Field	1983	Konami	
Daley Thompson's Decathlon	1984	Ocean Software	
Hes Games	1984	HESware	
Summer Games	1984	Epyx	
Summer Games II	1985	Epyx	
Winter Games	1985	Epyx	
Winter Olympics	1986	Tynesoft	
Stadium Events/World Class Track Meet	1986	Bandai	
Konami '88	1988	Konami	
Caveman Ughlympics	1988	Dynamix	
Track & Field II	1988	Konami	
Track Meet	1991	Interplay Entertainment	
The Games: Winter Challenge	1991	Accolade	
The Games: Summer Challenge	1992	Accolade	
The Games '92: España	1992	Ocean Software	
Gold Medal Challenge	1992	Capcom	
Decathlon	1992	C&E	
Alien Olympics 2044 AD	1994	Ocean Software	
DecAthlete	1996	Sega	
International Track & Field	1996	Konami	
Winter Heat	1997	Sega	
International Track & Field 2000	2000	Konami	
Millennium Winter Sports	2000	Konami	
Sergei Bubka's Millennium Games	2000	Midas Games	
ESPN International Winter Sports 2002	2002	Konami	
Asterix at the Olympic Games	2007	Étranges Libellules	
New International Track & Field	2008	Konami	
Summer Athletics	2008	DTP Entertainment	
My Game About Me: Olympic Challenge	2008	Double Fine	
QWOP	2009	Bennett Foddy	
Hyper Sports Winter	2010	Konami	
Hyper Sports Track & Field	2010	Konami	
Doodle Champion Island Games	2021	Google	
