= Decathlon (disambiguation) =

The decathlon is an athletic event combining ten track and field events.

Decathlon may also refer to:

- Decathlon (retailer), a global sporting goods retail store chain
- Decathlon (horse), an American Thoroughbred racehorse
- Academic Decathlon, an American academic competition
- American Champion Decathlon, a light aircraft

== Video games ==
- Decathlon (1992 video game), a NES game developed by C&E
- Bruce Jenner's World Class Decathlon (1996)
- Daley Thompson's Decathlon (1984)
- Olympic Decathlon (1981) or Microsoft Decathlon (1982)
- The Activision Decathlon, reissued as Decathlon by Firebird

== See also ==
- DecAthlete (video game), a 1994 arcade game and its console conversions
