= Olympic Summer Games (video game) =

1996 video game

- Developers: Silicon Dreams Studio (PS & 3DO); Tiertex Design Studios
- Publishers: Black Pearl Software; U.S. Gold (PS & 3DO)
- Platforms: SNES, Game Boy, PlayStation, Sega Genesis, 3DO
- Release: SNES: EU: June 28, 1996; NA: July 1996; Game Boy: NA: June 1996; EU: June 28, 1996; PlayStation: EU: July 1996; NA: July 23, 1996; Sega Genesis: EU: June 28, 1996; NA: July 1996; 3DO: NA: 1996
- Genre: Sports
- Modes: Single-player, multiplayer

Olympic Summer Games is an official video game of the Atlanta 1996 Olympic Games. It is the successor to Olympic Gold and Winter Olympics. It was the last "Olympic" video game released for the fourth generation of consoles, as well as the Game Boy.

It follows the already common button mashing techniques of previous (and future) games, with the usual exceptions.

It has 10 events (three more than Olympic Gold), with all but two based on track and field events. Unlike Winter Olympics, there are no major differences between each event on different platforms.

== Athletes ==
The game comes with eight preset athletes to choose from, but the player can customize their names and nationalities before entering events.

- (United States) Paul
- (United Kingdom) Chris
- (Canada) David
- (France) Kevin
- (Spain) Gary
- (Japan) Colin
- (Germany) Ian
- (Finland) Jon

== Events ==
- 100 m sprint
- 110 m hurdles
- Pole vault
- High jump
- Long Jump
- Triple Jump
- Javelin
- Discus
- Archery
- Skeet

== Gameplay ==
As in the previous titles, there are three difficulty levels and both Olympics and mini-Olympics (here called "custom game") modes. However, the points table was removed, and the only way to compare results is by the medals' table. In the sprinting events, there are two qualifying rounds, and only the winner (out of four competitors) passes to the next round. On long jump, triple jump, discus and javelin each player has three attempts; the best 10 progress to the final and have three extra attempts. The best result overall wins. In high jump and pole vault, there are not qualifying rounds; the players jump in turns until missing three consecutive jumps.

== Nations represented (Playstation version) ==
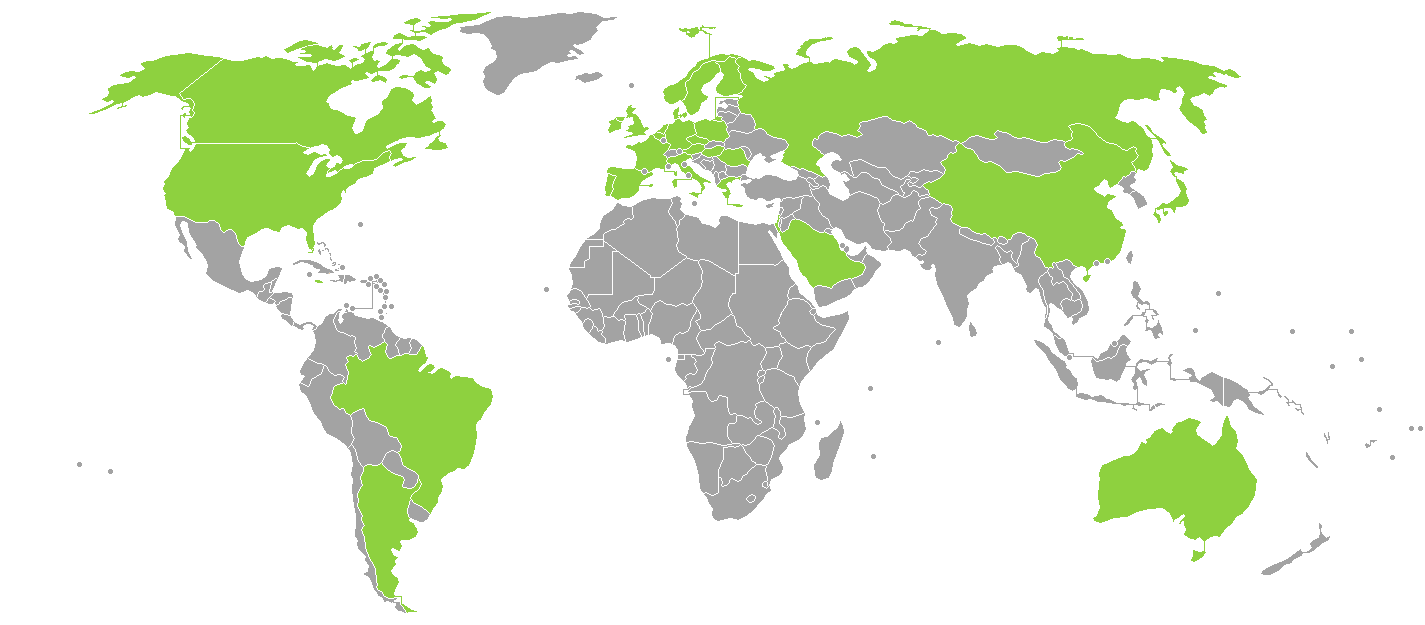
Playable countries

- Angola
- Argentina
- Australia
- Austria
- Belgium
- Bolivia
- Brazil
- Canada
- China
- Czech Republic
- Denmark
- Ecuador
- Finland
- France
- (United Kingdom) Great Britain
- Germany
- Greece
- Hungary
- (Republic of Ireland) Ireland
- Israel
- Italy
- Jamaica
- Japan
- Liberia
- Mexico
- Netherlands
- Norway
- Paraguay
- Peru
- Poland
- Portugal
- Romania
- Russia
- Saudi Arabia
- Spain
- Sweden
- Tunisia
- United Arab Emirates
- United States of America

== Release ==
In addition to fourth generation consoles, Olympic Summer Games was developed for the three major fifth generation consoles of the time: the PlayStation, Sega Saturn, and 3DO Interactive Multiplayer. However, the Saturn version, though completed, was never released.

== Reception ==
GamePro's Bruised Lee and Johnny Ballgame gave negative reviews to, respectively, the Genesis and Super NES versions. They criticized the bland, simplistic graphics, shortage of sound effects, repetitive music, and the lack of variety in the gameplay of the different events. Bruised Lee remarked that the Genesis version was even worse than the Super NES one. A reviewer for Next Generation contended that "Although buried behind substandard graphics (even for 16-bit standards), Olympic Summer Games features the multiple player gameplay that made Track and Field so popular." He described the gameplay's demand for a combination of intense button pounding and precise timing to be both an effective challenge and a traditionally fun experience, and scored the Super NES version three out of five stars.

Next Generation gave the 3DO version three out of five stars as well. The reviewer again praised the combination of button mashing and timing, and noted that while the graphics do not measure up to International Track & Field or DecAthlete, those two games would not have been able to run on the 3DO without significant compromises.

Reviewing the Game Boy version in GamePro, Coach Kyle praised the graphics and animation, but criticized the sound effects and said the gameplay was uninvolving.

The two sports reviewers of Electronic Gaming Monthly scored the PlayStation version 6.0 and 6.5 out of 10, complaining of low frame rates and a lack of lasting appeal. Johnny Ballgame said that some of the events require little skill, run too long, or suffer from poor graphics. He concluded, "Individually, some events have their moments. Overall, though, this game needs more training before competing against world-class competition like International track & Field."

Preceded by Olympic Gold	Official videogame of the Summer Olympic Games	Succeeded by Sydney 2000
