= Summer Games II =

1985 video game

- Commodore 64 cover art
- Developer: Epyx
- Publishers: NA: Epyx; EU: U.S. Gold
- Designers: Chuck Sommerville; Kevin Norman; Larry Clague; Jon Leupp; Michael Kosaka; Scott Nelson
- Composers: Randy Glover; Larry Clague
- Platforms: Commodore 64, Apple II, Atari ST, MS-DOS, ZX Spectrum, Amstrad CPC, Amiga
- Release: NA: June 1985; EU: 1985
- Genre: Sports (olympics)
- Modes: Single-player, multiplayer

Summer Games II is a 1985 Olympic sports video game developed and published by Epyx in North America, and by U.S. Gold in Europe. Based on sports featured in the Summer Olympic Games, it is a sequel to Summer Games released by Epyx the previous year. Summer Games II was originally written for the Commodore 64 and ported to the Apple II, Atari ST, MS-DOS, ZX Spectrum, Amstrad CPC and Amiga.

== Gameplay ==
The game was presented as a virtual multi-sport carnival called the "Epyx Games" (there was no official IOC licensing in place) with up to 8 players each choosing a country to represent, and then taking turns competing in various events to try for a medal. World records could be saved to the game disk.

The game features the following eight events: Triple jump, high jump, rowing, javelin throw, equestrian, fencing, kayaking and cycling.

The game allows the player to compete in all of the events sequentially, compete in some events, choose just one event, or practice an event. This version also features both the opening and closing ceremonies, where the closing ceremonies features a "fan man", the flame extinguishing as the sky goes dark, a blimp passing by and some fireworks. The Commodore 64 version also allow for participants to compete in events from the original Summer Games events, but they had to have the original Summer Games diskette for this to happen.

== Ports ==
Reception

Review score
Publication	Score
Zzap!64	97%

Awards
Publication	Award
Zzap!64	Gold Medal
Golden Joystick Awards; Game of the Year	Runner up

The original Commodore 64 version of Summer Games II was created by Scott Nelson, Jon Leupp, Chuck Sommerville, Kevin Norman, Michael Kosaka, and Larry Clague and published in 1985. The same year saw an Apple II version, ported by John Stouffer, Jeff Webb, Doug Matson, Greg Broniak, Tim Grost, Matt Decker, Vera Petrusha, Ken Evans, Pat Findling, Dr. Keith Dreyer, and Chris Oesterling. It became a bestseller in the UK.

A year later it was ported to the IBM PC by Phil Suematsu, Jeff Grigg, Don Hill, and Jimmy Huey. Richard Wilcox and Steve Hawkes ported it to the ZX Spectrum and Amstrad CPC. In 1992 Adam Steele, Phillip Morris, and Dave Lowe ported it to the Atari ST and the Amiga.

Summer Games II was re-released on the Virtual Console in Europe on June 27, 2008, and in North America on March 16, 2009.

A port for the Atari Jaguar CD was under development by Teque London, but work on the port was discontinued sometime in 1995 and it was never released.

== Reception ==
Reception

Review score
Publication	Score
Zzap!64	97%

Summer Games II was Epyx's second best-selling Commodore game as of late 1987 after Winter Games. Ahoy! said that "the production values of Summer Games II are absolutely top of the line, even better than the original Summer Games". The magazine cited equestrian and fencing as the best events, and concluded that it "covers itself with glory from the familiar opening ceremony to the closing festivities. Put simply, if you own a Commodore 64, this disk is a must".

== See also ==
- Daley Thompson's Decathlon
- Track & Field
- World Games
- California Games
