= Summer Games (video game) =

1984 video game

- Commodore 64 cover art
- Developer: Epyx
- Publishers: Epyx; Quicksilva; U.S. Gold
- Designers: Scott Nelson; Erin Murphy; Stephen Mudry; Brian McGhie; Stephen Landrum; Jon Leupp; Randy Glover
- Composer: Randy Glover
- Platforms: Commodore 64, Amiga, Apple II, Atari 2600, Atari 7800, Atari 8-bit, Atari ST, Master System, ZX Spectrum
- Release: 1984
- Genre: Sports
- Modes: Single-player, multiplayer

Summer Games is a 1984 sports video game developed and published by Epyx. Based on sports from the Summer Olympic Games, the game was released in 1984 for the Commodore 64, and was later ported to the Apple II, Atari 2600, Atari 7800, Atari 8-bit computers, and Master System.

In the UK, the game was first released by Quicksilva and subsequently by U.S. Gold who later created versions for the Amiga, ZX Spectrum, Amstrad CPC and Atari ST for inclusion in compilations. In 2004 it was re-released on the C64 Direct-to-TV.

Summer Games was the first in Epyx's Games series which continued with: Summer Games II, Winter Games, World Games, California Games, California Games II, The Games: Summer Edition, and The Games: Winter Edition.

== Gameplay ==
The pole vault event (Atari 8-bit)

The game is presented as a virtual multi-sport competition called the "Epyx Games" (there was no official IOC licensing in place) with up to eight players each choosing a country to represent, and then taking turns competing in various events to try for a medal. A score of 5:3:1 is used — gold medals 5 points, silver medals 3 points, and bronze medals 1 point. On most versions, world records can be saved to the floppy disk.

The Commodore 64 version allows players to link Summer Games and Summer Games II to engage in one large Olympics, accumulating medals in a tournament from both games.

=== Events ===
The events available vary slightly depending on the platform, and include pole vault, platform diving, sprinting, gymnastics, freestyle swimming, and skeet shooting.

The game allows the player to compete in all of the events sequentially, choose a few events, choose just one event, or practice an event.

== Development ==
The inspiration for Summer Games came from the Starpath Supercharger game Sweat! The Decathlon Game. It was inspired by earlier titles like Microsoft's Olympic Decathlon. While Sweat! was still in development Epyx purchased the ailing Starpath company. Work on the game was halted, because of the video game crash of 1983. All in-development Supercharger games were canceled and existing Supercharger inventory was liquidated but several developers at Starpath moved to Epyx including Sweat! programmer Scott Nelson. Work was started on a new decathlon game for the Commodore 64 named Summer Games. Scott Nelson worked on it and Summer Games II.

== Reception ==
Epyx sold more than 250,000 copies of Summer Games by November 1989; Ahoy! described it as "tremendously successful". As the first of Epyx's "Games" series, it founded what a historian later described as "the most sustainedly popular in the long life of the Commodore 64", the most popular home computer of the mid-1980s.

In 1996, Next Generation listed the "Games" series collectively as number 89 on its "Top 100 Games of All Time". The magazine wrote that though the games had great graphics for their time, their most defining qualities were their competitive multiplayer modes and "level of control that has yet to be equaled". In a retrospective review, Atari 7800 Forever gave only a 2.0 out of 5, criticizing the boring events.

== See also ==
- The Activision Decathlon (1983)
- Track & Field (1983)
- Daley Thompson's Decathlon (1984)
