= Beijing 2008 (video game) =

2008 sports video game

- Amanda Beard, Tyson Gay, Nastia Liukin and Reese Hoffa appear on the U.S. cover art for the game.
- Developer: Eurocom
- Publisher: Sega
- Platforms: Microsoft Windows, PlayStation 3, Xbox 360
- Release: PlayStation 3 & Xbox 360: AU: June 26, 2008; EU: June 27, 2008; NA: July 8, 2008; JP: July 31, 2008; Windows: NA: August 4, 2008; AU: August 7, 2008; EU: August 8, 2008; BRA: September 4, 2008; POR: September 8, 2008
- Genre: Sports
- Modes: Single-player, Multiplayer

Beijing 2008 is the official Olympic video game of the 2008 Summer Olympics held in Beijing. Developed by Eurocom and published by Sega, the game was the second video game based on the 2008 Summer Olympics to be released, the first being the fantasy-based Mario & Sonic at the Olympic Games which appeared in late 2007; however, Beijing 2008 is a realistic sports simulation.

Beijing 2008 features 32 national teams and 38 events. In addition, a career mode similar to that seen in Sydney 2000 returned, and for the first time in Olympic video games, an online mode is included.

== Disciplines ==
The following events are in the game:

- Track
  - 100 m
  - 200 m
  - 400 m
  - 800 m
  - 1500 m
  - 100 m hurdles (women only)
  - 110 m hurdles (men only)
- Field
  - High jump
  - Pole vault
  - Long jump
  - Triple jump
  - Shot put
  - Discus throw
  - Hammer throw
  - Javelin throw
- Aquatics
  - 50 m freestyle swimming (men only)
  - 100 m backstroke swimming (men only)
  - 100 m butterfly swimming (men only)
  - 100 m breaststroke swimming (men only)
  - 3 m springboard diving (women only)
  - 10 m platform diving (women only)
- Gymnastics
  - Parallel bars (men only)
  - Vault (men only)
  - Rings (men only)
  - Floor exercise (women only)
  - Beam (women only)
  - Uneven bars (women only)
- Shooting (all men only events)
  - Skeet shooting
  - 10 m Air Pistol
  - 25 m Rapid Fire Pistol
- Other
  - Archery, individual (women only)
  - Weightlifting, +105 kg (men only)
  - Cycling, team pursuit (men only)
  - Canoeing/kayak K1, kayak single (men only)
  - Judo, 81–90 kg (men only)
  - Table tennis, singles (men only)

In addition, the game supports competition in the male decathlon or the female heptathlon, 5, 10 or 20 random events, or all of the events. It is possible to take part in all male and female events individually.

== Nations represented ==
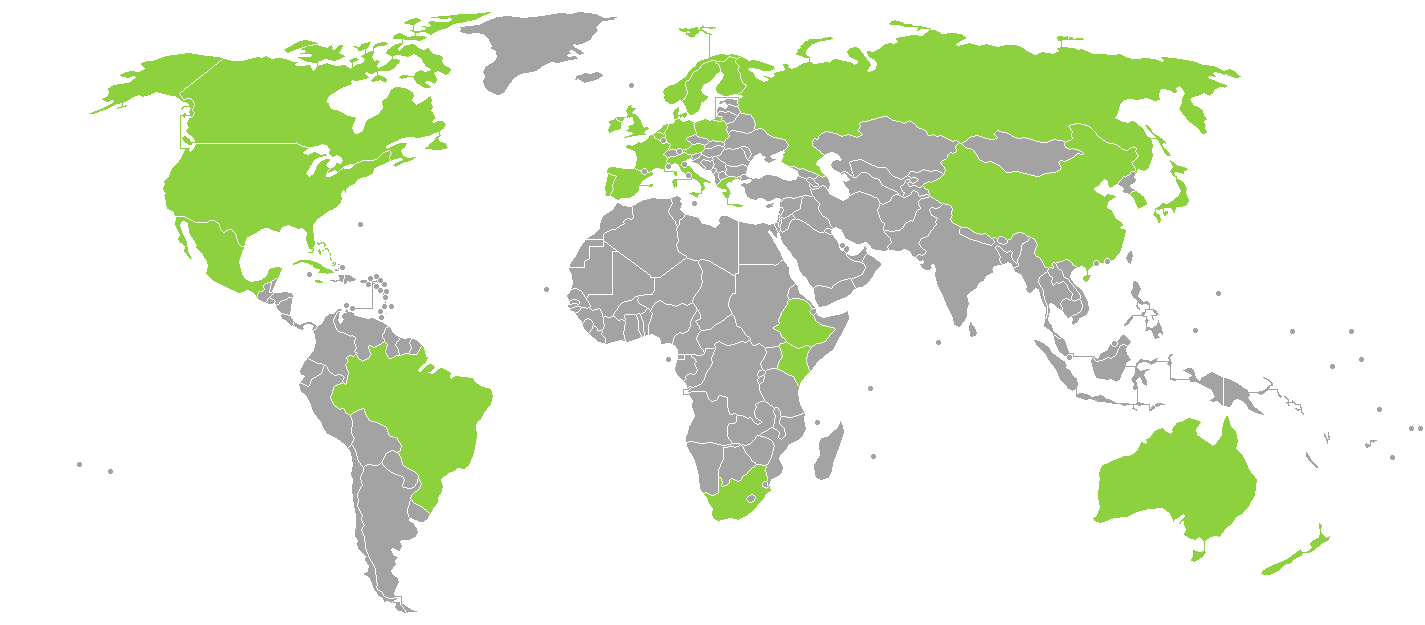
Playable countries

- Australia
- Austria
- (The Bahamas) Bahamas
- Belgium
- Brazil
- Canada
- China
- Cuba
- Denmark
- Ethiopia
- Finland
- France
- (United Kingdom) Great Britain
- Germany
- Greece
- (Republic of Ireland) Ireland
- Italy
- Jamaica
- Japan
- Kenya
- Mexico
- Netherlands
- New Zealand
- Norway
- Poland
- Portugal
- Russia
- South Africa
- South Korea
- Spain
- Sweden
- United States

== Reception ==
Reception

Aggregate score
Aggregator	Score		
Aggregator	PC	PS3	Xbox 360
Metacritic	52/100	58/100	60/100

Review scores
Publication	Score		
Publication	PC	PS3	Xbox 360
Edge	N/A	N/A	5/10
Eurogamer	N/A	N/A	5/10
Famitsu	N/A	14/40	16/40
GameSpot	3/10	3/10	3/10
GameZone	N/A	N/A	5.5/10
IGN	5.6/10	7.7/10	7.7/10
Official Xbox Magazine (US)	N/A	N/A	2.5/10
PC Gamer (UK)	48%	N/A	N/A
PC PowerPlay	6/10	N/A	N/A
PlayStation: The Official Magazine	N/A	2.5/5	N/A
Common Sense Media	N/A	4/5	4/5

Beijing 2008 received "mixed" reviews on all platforms according to the review aggregation website Metacritic. GameSpot said of the game, "rapidly pushing buttons is not fun", and pointed to excessive difficulty. In Japan, Famitsu gave it a score of one three, two fours, and one three for the PlayStation 3 version; and one four, one five, one four, and one three for the Xbox 360 version.

== See also ==
- Olympic video games
- 2008 Summer Olympics

Preceded by Athens 2004	Official videogame of the Summer Olympic Games	Succeeded by London 2012
