= ESPN International Winter Sports 2002 =

- PAL version cover art
- Developer: Konami Computer Entertainment Osaka
- Publisher: Konami
- Platforms: PlayStation 2, GameCube, Game Boy Advance, Xbox
- Release: January 29, 2002: NA: January 29, 2002; JP: January 31, 2002; PAL: February 1, 2002 (GBA); PAL: February 8, 2002 (PS2); JP: February 22, 2002 (Xbox); PAL: April 12, 2002 (Xbox); PAL: May 3, 2002 (GC)
- Genre: Sports
- Modes: Single-player, multiplayer

ESPN International Winter Sports 2002, (Note: PlayStation 2 version is known in Europe as ESPN International Winter Sports and GameCube and Xbox versions are known in Europe as International Winter Sports.) known in Japan as Hyper Sports 2002 Winter (ハイパースポーツ2002 WINTER, Haipā Supōtsu 2002 Wintā), is the name of two sports video games released in 2002 by Konami, one for the PlayStation 2, Xbox, and GameCube, and the other for the Game Boy Advance. In Japan the game is part of the Hyper Sports series, known internationally as the Track & Field series.

== Reception ==
Reception

Aggregate score
Aggregator	Score			
Aggregator	GBA	GameCube	PS2	Xbox
Metacritic	74/100	62/100	62/100	62/100

Review scores
Publication	Score			
Publication	GBA	GameCube	PS2	Xbox
AllGame	N/A	N/A	2/5	N/A
Electronic Gaming Monthly	N/A	N/A	5/10	N/A
Famitsu	26/40	29/40	29/40	26/40
Game Informer	N/A	N/A	7/10	3/10
GameSpot	N/A	N/A	5.2/10	4.6/10
GameSpy	N/A	N/A	N/A	87%
GameZone	8.2/10	7.8/10	5.5/10	N/A
IGN	N/A	5.5/10	5.5/10	5.5/10
Nintendo Power	N/A	2.8/5	N/A	N/A
Official U.S. PlayStation Magazine	N/A	N/A	4/5	N/A
Official Xbox Magazine (US)	N/A	N/A	N/A	5.9/10

The game received "mixed or average reviews" on all platforms according to the review aggregation website Metacritic. In Japan, Famitsu gave it a score of 29 out of 40 for the GameCube and PlayStation 2 versions, and 26 out of 40 for the Game Boy Advance and Xbox versions.

Star Dingo of GamePro called the PlayStation 2 version one of the "healthier" clones of Decathlon. (Note: GamePro gave the PlayStation 2 version 3.5/5 for graphics, 3/5 for sound, and two 4/5 scores for control and fun factor.) Major Mike called the Xbox version "universally fun" and recommended it for fans of the winter sports genre. (Note: GamePro gave the Xbox version two 4/5 scores for graphics and fun factor, 3/5 for sound, and 4.5/5 for control.)

== See also ==
- Nagano Winter Olympics '98
- ESPN International Track & Field
