= Virtua Athlete 2K =

2000 sports video game

- Developer: Hitmaker
- Publishers: WW: Sega; NA: Agetec (DC)
- Director: Shinichi Ogasawara
- Platforms: Dreamcast, Arcade, PlayStation 2
- Release: Dreamcast: JP: July 27, 2000; UK: August 25, 2000; NA: September 12, 2000; Arcade: NA: 2001; JP: March 2002; PlayStation 2: JP: July 29, 2004
- Genre: Sports
- Modes: Single-player, multiplayer

Virtua Athlete 2K (Note: Japanese: バーチャ アスリート 2K, Hepburn: Bācha Asurīto 2K), known as Virtua Athlete 2000 in North America, is a Sega Dreamcast track and field sports game developed by Hitmaker. The arcade game Virtua Athletics, also known in Japan as Virtua Athlete (Note: Japanese: バーチャ アスリート, Hepburn: Bācha Asurīto), is based on the Dreamcast version. Virtua Athlete 2K supports up to four local players simultaneously as to compete for the top score through all seven of its events. Virtua Athlete was released on the PlayStation 2 in Japan as part of the DecAthlete Collection with DecAthlete and Winter Heat. The collection is the 15th volume of the Sega Ages 2500 series.

== Reception ==
Reception

Aggregate score
Aggregator	Score
Metacritic	61/100

Review scores
Publication	Score
AllGame	3.5/5
CNET Gamecenter	6/10
Edge	5/10
Electronic Gaming Monthly	5.67/10 (Note: Two critics of Electronic Gaming Monthly gave the game each a score of 6/10, and the other gave it 5/10.)
Eurogamer	3/10
Famitsu	31/40
Game Informer	7/10
GameFan	75% (Note: In GameFan's viewpoint of the game, one critic gave it 72, and the other 77.)
GamePro	3.5/5
GameSpot	7.7/10
IGN	(JP) 5.9/10 (US) 4/10
Next Generation	2/5

The game received "mixed" reviews according to the review aggregation website Metacritic. Kevin Rice of NextGen said of the game, "Already limited by only having seven events, this game falls flat on the Olympic track with frustrating controls and disappointing gameplay." In Japan, Famitsu gave it a score of 31 out of 40.

An IGN review published following the game's release in North America read, "Best described as an interactive movie about the Olympics, Virtua Athlete is as basic a game as you can get [...] It's just too bad that the game play doesn't match their respective graphical accomplishment."

European reception was mixed. British magazine Computer and Video Games awarded Virtua Athlete 2K four stars out of five, praising its accessible athletics gameplay and multiplayer appeal. French magazine Consoles+ was highly positive, awarding the game 92%. The publication particularly praised its graphics, animation, playability and longevity, while regarding the presentation as comparatively basic.

German magazine MAN!AC was considerably more critical, giving the game 58 out of 100. Although acknowledging its improved Dreamcast presentation, the magazine criticised the limited selection of events and considered it a disappointing successor to Athlete Kings. Spanish magazine Revista Oficial Dreamcast gave it 7 out of 10, finding the multiplayer mode highly entertaining but criticising the limited single-player experience and arguing that the game did not fully realise its potential.
