= Olympics Go! Paris 2024 =

2024 video game

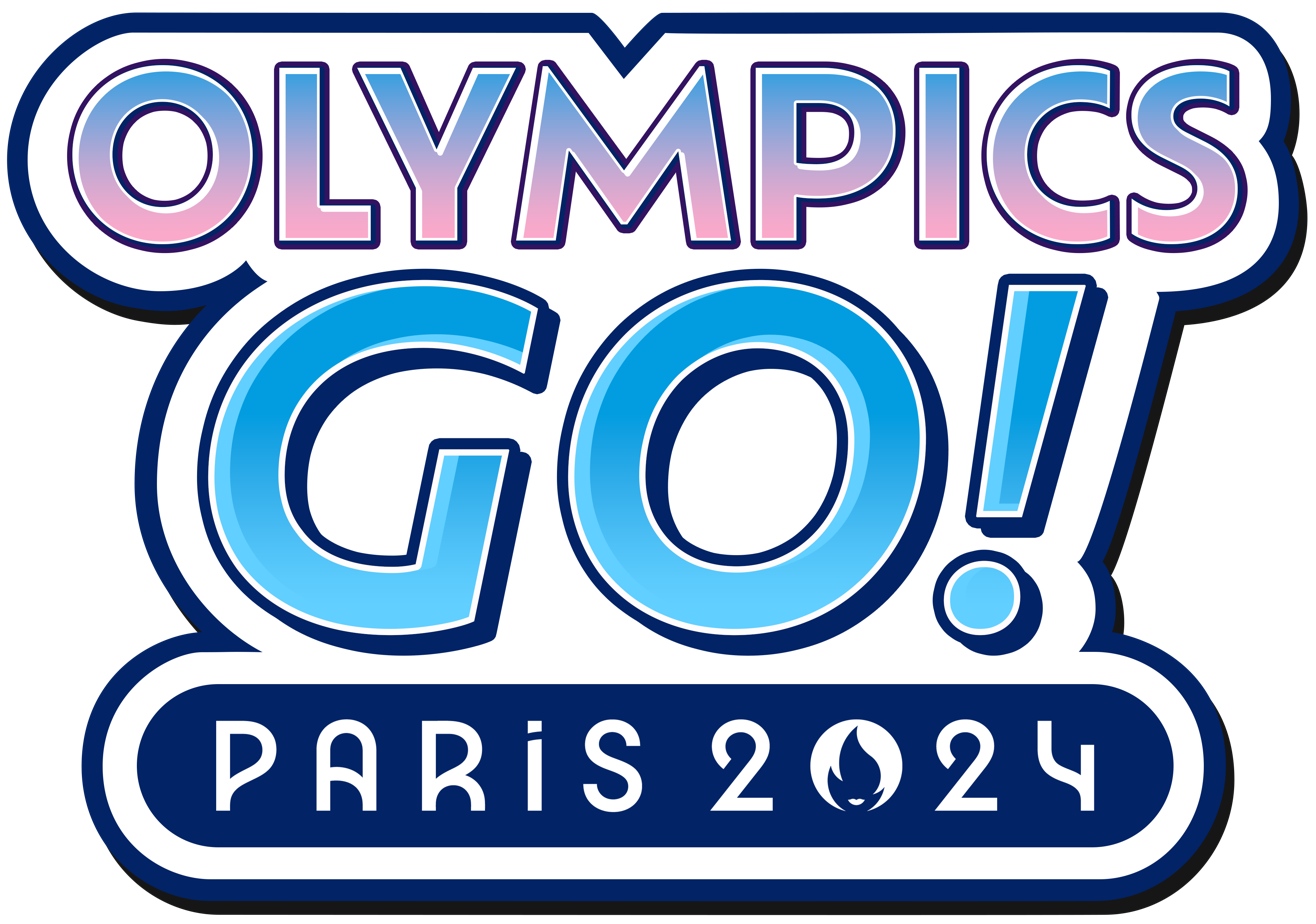
- Logo
- Developer: Nvizzio Creations
- Publisher: nWay
- Platforms: Mobile, PC
- Release: June 11, 2024
- Genres: Sports, City-building

Olympics Go! Paris 2024 (stylized as Olympics GO! Paris 2024) is a 2024 city-building and sports video game published by nWay and officially licensed with the International Olympic Committee (IOC) to coincide with the 2024 Summer Olympics.

== Gameplay ==
Olympics Go! Paris 2024 features elements of city-building games and sports games. The city-building portion of the game tasks players with developing properties around venues in Paris to boost visitor attendance at the Olympic sporting events. The sporting portion of the game features twelve events, and players can compete to reach a global leaderboard. The twelve sports featured in the game are archery, artistic gymnastics, athletics, basketball, breaking, cycling, fencing, golf, rowing, shooting, skateboarding, and swimming. Each sport has four levels of difficulty. The sports can also be played in either single-player mode or multiplayer mode, either in person or over the Internet.

The game is free-to-play, but includes a virtual shop where points can purchased through microtransactions to be spent on in-game upgrades. The video game also features non-fungible token integration, with players being able to claim an "officially licensed, commemorative Paris 2024 NFT Digital Pin".

== Development and release ==
The 2024 Summer Olympics were the first Olympic games in over thirty years to not have a home console video game tie-in. Since 2007, official Olympic video games had been developed by Nintendo and Sega with the Mario & Sonic at the Olympic Games series, but the International Olympic Committee chose not to renew their contract for the 2024 Summer Olympics. Lee Cocker, a developer of the Mario & Sonic at the Olympic Games series, stated that the IOC made the decision to end the contract because they had to share profits with Nintendo and Sega, and that by hiring nWay to replace them, they earned a larger percentage of profits.

Developer Nvizzio Creation is based in Montreal, Canada. The game released on June 11, 2024, with little advertising. It was later released on PC through the Epic Games Store.

== Reception ==
The game has been criticized for its focus on in-game microtransactions. Writing for Aftermath, critic Riley MacLeod wrote that "the game feels mostly focused on the kinds of microtransactions and incentives to spend you'd expect from a free-to-play mobile game". Corentin Benoit-Gonin from Le Monde also criticized the small scale of Olympics Go! Paris 2024, writing that the game, with its "small number of events, rudimentary handling and very limited graphics, is bound to disappoint". Fans of the Mario & Sonic at the Olympic Games series expressed disappointment over the IOC's decision to cancel the franchise in favor of Olympics Go! Paris 2024.

== See also ==
- List of Olympic video games
