= London 2012 (video game) =

2012 video game

- European Xbox 360 cover art
- Developers: Sega Studios Australia; Neowiz (iOS, Android)
- Publishers: Sega; Neowiz (iOS, Android)
- Platforms: Cloud (OnLive); Microsoft Windows; PlayStation 3; Xbox 360; Android; iOS
- Release: iOS; 19 June 2012; Windows, PlayStation 3, Xbox 360: NA: 26 June 2012; AU: 28 June 2012; EU: 29 June 2012; Android; 10 October 2012
- Genre: Sports (Olympic)
- Modes: Single-player, multiplayer

London 2012: The Official Video Game is a 2012 sports video game developed by Sega Studios Australia and published by Sega. It is the official Olympic video game of the 2012 Summer Olympics in London. It was the only game to be developed by Sega Studios Australia after its separation from Creative Assembly and before its closure. The iOS and Android versions were developed and published by Neowiz.

The game features 37 countries, and 31 events. New disciplines included 10m Synchronised Platform Diving, Trampoline, Beach Volleyball and Keirin. It features an online mode for players wishing to compete with other challengers worldwide. The "national pride" is a ranking system in the online mode, where the players have the possibility to collect medals for their favourite country.

== Disciplines ==
These events are in the game:

Archery (held at Lord's)

- Individual
- Team (Note: Only playable in local multiplayer mode)

Aquatics (held at the London Aquatics Centre)

- 3m springboard diving
- 3m synchronised springboard diving (Note: Included in an Olympic video game for the first time)
- 10m platform diving
- 10m synchronised platform diving
- Swimming – 50m freestyle
- Swimming – 100m backstroke
- Swimming – 100m breaststroke
- Swimming – 100m butterfly
- Swimming – 100m freestyle

Gymnastics (held at The O2 Arena)

- Trampoline (men only)
- Vault

Shooting (held at the Royal Artillery Barracks, Woolwich)

- 25 metre rapid fire pistol (men only)
- Skeet shooting

Track and field (held at the London Stadium)

- 100 metres (men only)
- 110 metres hurdles (men only)
- 200 metres (men only)
- 400 metres
- High jump
- Long jump (men only)
- Triple jump (men only)
- Javelin throw (men only)
- Shot put (men only)
- Discus throw (men only)

Other sports

- Beach volleyball (women only)
- Canoe slalom – K1 Kayak (men only)
- Cycling – keirin (men only)
- Rowing – Single sculls (men only)
- Table tennis (men only)
- Weightlifting over 105 kilograms (231 lb) (men only)

The game therefore includes 8 of the events from the decathlon (only missing pole vault and 1500 metres).

== Nations represented ==
- Australia
- Austria
- Belgium
- Brazil
- Canada
- China
- Czech Republic
- Denmark
- Finland
- France
- Germany
- Great Britain
- Greece
- Hungary
- Ireland
- Italy
- Jamaica
- Japan
- Kenya
- Mexico
- Netherlands
- New Zealand
- Norway
- Poland
- Portugal
- Romania
- Russia
- Slovakia
- South Africa
- South Korea
- Spain
- Sweden
- Switzerland
- Turkey
- Ukraine
- United States

== Reception ==
Reception

Aggregate score
Aggregator	Score			
Aggregator	iOS	PC	PS3	Xbox 360
Metacritic	66/100	65/100	66/100	64/100

Review scores
Publication	Score			
Publication	iOS	PC	PS3	Xbox 360
Electronic Gaming Monthly	N/A	N/A	N/A	5/10
Eurogamer	N/A	N/A	N/A	5/10
GamesMaster	N/A	N/A	N/A	75%
GameSpot	N/A	N/A	6.5/10	6.5/10
GameZone	N/A	N/A	N/A	7.5/10
IGN	N/A	N/A	7/10	7/10
PlayStation Official Magazine – Australia	N/A	N/A	6/10	N/A
PlayStation Official Magazine – UK	N/A	N/A	8/10	N/A
Official Xbox Magazine (US)	N/A	N/A	N/A	6/10
VideoGamer.com	N/A	N/A	N/A	5/10
Digital Spy	N/A	N/A	N/A	3/5
Metro	N/A	N/A	N/A	7/10

London 2012 received "mixed or average reviews" on all platforms according to the review aggregation website Metacritic.

Chris Schilling of IGN said of the PlayStation 3 and Xbox 360 versions that "Sega's celebration of the year's biggest sporting event is better than you might expect." In his opinion, the events of both versions would not hold up too well in the long term, but that is not really what an Olympics game is about. He praised the online and offline multiplayer mode. The German PC game magazine GameStar criticized the gameplay, because it is almost impossible to play it with the mouse and the keyboard, so the player is forced to get a gamepad to play London 2012. They also mentioned that the gameplay of the events would not be different from each other and that the AI of the computer opponents is not balanced.

The Digital Fix gave the PS3 version seven out of ten and said it was "a fine example of an Olympics type game. The presentation is excellent, the events are more varied than you might expect and the subtleties of controls mean you'll have a wonderful time as you begin any experience with the game." Metro gave the Xbox 360 version a similar score of seven out of ten and said it was "Not just an Olympics tie-in but a proper sports game, with the majority of events finding a good balance between realism and enjoyment." However, Digital Spy gave the same console version three stars out of five and said, "There are lots of events that can be enjoyed time and time again, although far less than the 46 advertised. Motion controls add very little, but do at least offer new ways to experience the game, alongside a plethora of game modes. While London 2012: The Game may fall short of Gold, it's certainly deserving of a respectable Bronze."

The game held the top spot of the UK All Format chart for three weeks following its release. It reached number 9 in the PS3 PAL downloads chart. As of May 2013, the game has sold 680,000 copies in the US and Europe.

Preceded by Beijing 2008	Official videogame of the Summer Olympic Games	Succeeded by Rio 2016
