= Vancouver 2010 (video game) =

2010 video game

- European cover art
- Developers: Eurocom; GameHouse (iOS)
- Publishers: Sega; GameHouse (iOS)
- Platforms: Microsoft Windows, PlayStation 3, Xbox 360, iOS
- Release: PlayStation 3, Xbox 360: NA: January 12, 2010; EU: January 15, 2010; AU: February 4, 2010; Microsoft Windows: AU: January 2010; NA: January 15, 2010; EU: January 15, 2010; iOS; February 16, 2010
- Genre: Sports (Olympic)
- Modes: Single-player, multiplayer

Vancouver 2010 is the official Olympic video game of the 2010 Winter Olympics held in Vancouver, British Columbia, Canada. It was developed by Eurocom (who had worked on previous Olympic games in 2004 and 2008), and published by Sega.

== Gameplay ==
Vancouver 2010 is a video game based on the Vancouver 2010 Winter Olympic Games. Many of the events in the real-world Olympics are playable.

== Disciplines ==
The following events are in the game:

- Alpine skiing
  - Giant slalom (women only)
  - Slalom (women only)
  - Downhill (men only)
  - Super-G (men only)
- Sledding
  - Two-Man Bobsleigh (men only)
  - Luge Singles (men only)
  - Skeleton (men only)
- Freestyle skiing
  - Aerials (women only)
  - Ski Cross (women only)
- Snowboarding
  - Parallel giant slalom (men only)
  - Snowboard Cross (men only)
- Ski Jumping
  - Individual Large Hill (men only)
- Speed Skating
  - 500 m Short track speed skating (women only)
  - 1,500 m Short track speed skating (women only)

In addition, the game includes 30 different challenges spread over all the events which can be unlocked on a one-by-one basis as the user completes the tasks (For example, the 'Landing Zone' challenge forces the individual to land a ski jump with 10m of 90m and another successive jump within 10m of 120m).

== Playable nations ==
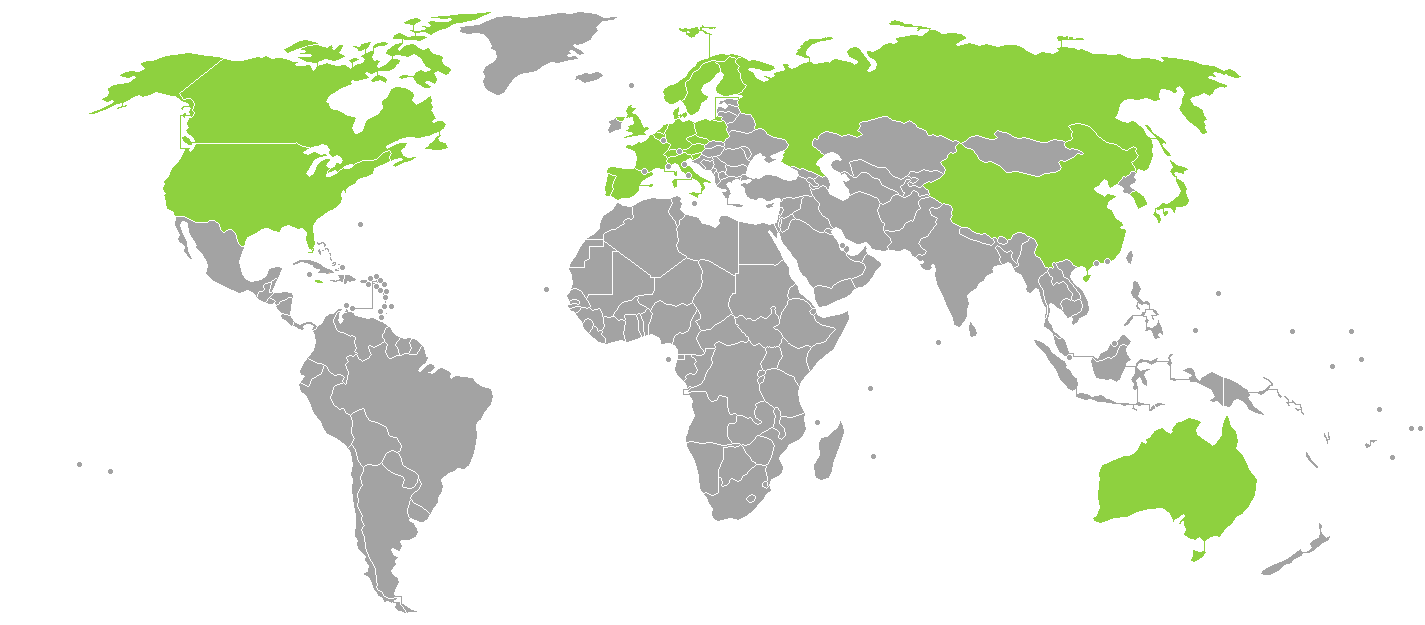
Playable countries

There is a total of 24 playable countries in the game. They are:

- Australia
- Austria
- Belgium
- Canada
- China
- Czech Republic
- Denmark
- Spain
- Finland
- France
- Great Britain
- Germany
- Italy
- Japan
- South Korea
- Netherlands
- Norway
- Poland
- Portugal
- Russia
- Slovenia
- Switzerland
- Sweden
- United States

== Reception ==
Reception

Aggregate scores
| Aggregator | Score | | | |
| Aggregator | iOS | PC | PS3 | Xbox 360 |
|---|---|---|---|---|
| GameRankings | 60% | 57% | 56% | 55% |
| Metacritic | N/A | 57/100 | 56/100 | 54/100 |

Review scores
| Publication | Score | | | |
| Publication | iOS | PC | PS3 | Xbox 360 |
|---|---|---|---|---|
| Eurogamer | N/A | N/A | N/A | 3/10 |
| GamePro | N/A | N/A | 2.5/5 | N/A |
| GameRevolution | N/A | N/A | C− | N/A |
| GameSpot | N/A | N/A | 5.5/10 | 5.5/10 |
| GameZone | N/A | N/A | N/A | 6/10 |
| IGN | 6/10 | N/A | 7.3/10 | 7.3/10 |
| Official Xbox Magazine (US) | N/A | N/A | N/A | 5.5/10 |
| PC Gamer (UK) | N/A | 58% | N/A | N/A |
| PlayStation: The Official Magazine | N/A | N/A | 3/5 | N/A |
| VideoGamer.com | N/A | N/A | 4/10 | 4/10 |
| The Guardian | N/A | 3/5 | 3/5 | 3/5 |
| Teletext GameCentral | N/A | N/A | 4/10 | N/A |

Vancouver 2010 received "mixed" reviews on all platforms according to the review aggregation website Metacritic. IGN said of the PlayStation 3 and Xbox 360 versions: "If only this game had some semblance of a career mode or anything that felt slightly like the real Olympics, then perhaps SEGA would have had a real winner on its hands". GameSpot said of the same console versions: "The limited selection of events leaves these Olympic Games out in the cold".

== See also ==
- Olympic video games
- 2010 Winter Olympics
- Mario & Sonic at the Olympic Winter Games
