= Sled Shred featuring the Jamaican Bobsled Team =

2010 video game

- Developer: Just for Fun Studios
- Publisher: SouthPeak Games
- Platform: Wii
- Release: October 12, 2010
- Genres: Sports; Racing

Sled Shred featuring the Jamaican Bobsled Team is a 2010 sports and racing video game developed by Just for Fun Studios and published by SouthPeak Games for the Wii. The game is based on the Jamaica national bobsled team.

== Gameplay ==
Sled Shred featuring the Jamaican Bobsled Team can be played with a Wii Remote and Nunchuk, a Classic Controller, or a Wii Balance Board. Players can swing the Wii Remote and Nunchuk while racing to shove opponents out of their way, and they can swing the Wii Remote to throw snowballs. If players use the Wii Balance Board, they can lean their bodies as they turn. The game also has a multiplayer mode that allows players to either compete against each other or work together against computer-controlled opponents.

The game's story mode follows three children who encounter a Jamaican bobsled coach named Coach Mon who is searching for a sledder with enough skill to compete alongside the Jamaica national bobsled team at the "Winter World Games". The goal of story mode is to win either first or second place against three other racers. Players will unlock new racers, sleds, and power-ups as they progress through story mode.

The game also has a free-play mode and players can customize a circuit with specific tracks, obstacles, and power-ups. Players may race with one of four different sled types that each play differently: an innertube, a disc, a two-person toboggan, and a four-person bobsled. The innertube is the easiest to control while the disc has a special power to create tornadoes and is faster than the innertube. When using the toboggan, players are teamed with a computer-controlled teammate and must lean in conjunction to gain speed. The bobsled is the fastest sled in the game. Items on racetracks may provide power-ups such as snowballs to throw at opponents or speed boosts. The game has over 10 racing courses. Players can perform tricks and stunts during their races to improve their scores.

== Reception ==
Writing for Capsule Computers, reviewer Dustin Spencer gave the game a rating of 7.5 out of 10. He said that the game has a lot of personality and charm, and that the game's low price and fun factor made it one of the best racing games on the Wii. However, he noted that the game had some issues with low framerate. Cary Woodham from GamerDads said that children would enjoy the game's cartoony graphics and simple controls, but that it had issues such as overly challenging computer opponents and "pretty horrible" graphics, although the game's price of $20 at launch was reasonable.

Matthew Schomer of GameRant stated that the game has some of the same qualities that made the Mario Kart series successful. Game Informer listed the game as one of their top 10 "weird" sports video games, stating that it "doesn't have the replay value or fun factor of something like Mario Kart".

== See also ==
- Cool Runnings
- List of Olympic video games
