= World Games (video game) =

- Apple IIGS cover art
- Developers: Epyx; K-Byte
- Publishers: NA: Epyx; EU: U.S. Gold
- Composers: Steve Mage; Keisuke Tsukahara (Master System)
- Platforms: Amiga, Amstrad CPC, Apple II, Apple IIGS, Atari ST, Commodore 64, MSX, NES, Master System, IBM PC, ZX Spectrum
- Release: 1986
- Genre: Sports
- Mode: Single-player

World Games is a sports video game developed by Epyx for the Commodore 64 in 1986. Versions for the Apple IIGS, Amstrad CPC, ZX Spectrum, Master System and other contemporary systems were also released. The NES version was released by Milton Bradley, and ported by Software Creations on behalf of producer Rare. The Master System version was done by Sega.

The game is a continuation of the Epyx sports line that includes Summer Games and Winter Games.

World Games was made available in Europe for the Wii Virtual Console on April 25, 2008.

== Events ==
The events available vary slightly depending on the platform, and may include:

- Weightlifting (Soviet Union)
- Slalom skiing (France)
- Log rolling (Canada)
- Cliff diving (Mexico)
- Caber toss (Scotland)
- Bull riding (United States)
- Barrel jumping (Germany)
- Sumo Wrestling (Japan)

The game allows the player to compete in all of the events sequentially, choose a few events, choose just one event, or practice an event.

== Reception ==
Reception

Review scores
Publication	Score
Crash	71%
Sinclair User	5/5
Your Sinclair	9/10
Zzap!64	98%
Your Computer	5/5
Computer Gamer	65%

Award
Publication	Award
Zzap!64	Gold Medal

Writing for Info, Benn Dunnington gave the Commodore 64 version of World Games three-plus stars out of five and described it as "my least favorite of the series". Stating that slalom skiing was the best event, he concluded that "Epyx does such a nice, consistent job of execution, tho, that it's hard to take off too many points even for such boring material". Computer Gaming World's Rick Teverbaugh criticized the slalom skiing and log rolling events' difficulty, but concluded that "World Games is still a must for the avid sports games". Charles Ardai called the game "an adequate sequel" to Epyx's previous Games, and praised the graphics. He criticized the mechanics "as bizarre little joystick patterns which have little to do with the events" but still recommended the game because of the log rolling event. Jame Trunzo praised the game's use of advanced graphics and sound, including humorous effects. Also noted was the variety in the included games, preventing the game from getting too repetitive.

The game was reviewed in 1988 in Dragon #132 by Hartley, Patricia, and Kirk Lesser in "The Role of Computers" column. The reviewers gave the game 5 out of 5 stars.

A budget-priced re-release of the Commodore 64 version was positively received in Commodore User who said it was "the pinnacle of the Games series".
