= Paul Owens (games programmer) =

British video game programmer

Paul Owens is a British video game programmer who worked at Ocean Software in the 1980s and 90s and was the founding programmer employed by Spectrum Games prior to Ocean Software being established. He is best known for writing the ZX Spectrum version of Daley Thompson’s Decathlon. Mainly concentrating on the ZX Spectrum, he wrote over 14 titles but also collaborated on many other games and other platforms including the Amstrad CPC along with developing other software such as the Ocean Spectrum Loader and game development software.

In the 80s, Ocean Software collaborated with Sinclair Research to help develop the Sinclair hardware and Paul received a letter of commendation from Sir Clive Sinclair after helping to iron out some problems with the ZX Spectrum 128 (codenamed Derby) prior to its release.

== Games ==
Road Frog	Spectrum Games	1983
Kong	Ocean Software	1984
Daley Thompson's Decathlon	Ocean Software	1984
Hunchback	Ocean Software	1984
Cavelon	Ocean Software	1984
Daley Thompson's Supertest	Ocean Software	1985
Hunchback II: Quasimodo's Revenge	Ocean Software	1985
Mr Wimpy	Ocean Software	1984
Short Circuit	Ocean Software	1985
Gryzor	Ocean Software	1985
Street Hawk	Ocean Software	1985
Vindicator	Ocean Software	1988
Dragon Ninja	Ocean Software	1988
