= DecAthlete =

1996 video game

- European Sega Saturn cover
- Developer: Sega AM3
- Publisher: Sega
- Director: Yoshitaka Maeyama
- Producer: Mie Kumagai
- Programmer: Shinobu Hayashi
- Artist: Seiichi Yamagata
- Composer: Saeko Sasaki
- Platforms: Arcade, Sega Saturn, PlayStation 2
- Release: Arcade; May 1996; Saturn: JP: July 12, 1996; NA: July 17, 1996; EU: September 1996; PlayStation 2: JP: July 29, 2004
- Genre: Sport
- Mode: Up to 2 players simultaneously
- Arcade system: ST-V

DecAthlete, (Note: Japanese: デカスリート, Hepburn: Dekasurīto) released in Europe as Athlete Kings due to a licensing issue, is a track-and-field themed arcade sports video game. On its unveiling, the gaming media generally described it as a modern clone of Daley Thompson's Decathlon. Released in 1996, it was developed by Sega AM3 and produced by Sega. A home port was released on the Sega Saturn in 1996, largely identical to the arcade version, due to the similar hardware of the ST-V hardware and the Saturn. It was released on the PlayStation 2 in Japan only as part of the Sega Ages 2500 series. Compared to other decathlon based games, Decathlete has a more comic and cartoon-like style. A sequel followed in 1997, which was the winter sports-based Winter Heat.

== Gameplay ==
Screenshot of DecAthlete during gameplay.

The overall gameplay is largely based on quick, repeated button pressing for gaining speed, and timed single button presses for jumping and releasing projectiles, in a similar style to the 1983 Konami arcade game, Track & Field. The game differs with a slightly more advanced control system and 3-D graphics.

The player must select one of eight fictional international athletes. In all versions, the player competes in ten traditional decathlon events: 100 metres, Long jump, Shot put, High jump, 400 metres, 110 metre hurdles, Discus throw, Pole vault, Javelin throw and 1500 metres. In the arcade version, the player is required to meet a minimum set time, height or distance to qualify for the next event. The home console versions allow the player to compete in a full decathlon featuring all ten events without qualifying limit. Despite a potential for a multiplayer gameplay, the game is limited to two players at a time. In a one-player game, the player competes against one AI-controlled opponent, chosen from the list of playable characters. The only exception to this is in the 1500 metres, where six generic athletes also participate in the race.

The PlayStation 2 port still allows only up to two human players to participate, but all playable characters appear in the sprint and dash events.

== Characters ==
- (United States) Rick Blade: Also known as the "Pennsylvanian Power", the 25-year-old American athlete Blade is an all-rounder, making him a favourite in any event. He is roughly based on legendary athlete Carl Lewis.
- (Germany) Karl Vain: A 28-year-old German competitor with long blonde hair who's known for his sheer confidence, to the point of arrogance. Although competitive in all events, he is said to be able to jump over anything.
- (United Kingdom) Robin Banks: A veteran at 38 years old, zebra print leotard-clad Banks is the reigning champion from the previous decathlon. The giant Briton is particularly strong in the throwing events. He is roughly similar in appearance to legendary athlete Daley Thompson. For the home releases of the game, his name was changed to Jef Jansens. He was also removed altogether from the US release.
- (Russia) Aleksei Rigel: A seasoned decathlon competitor, Rigel is physically the strongest of the eight competitors. This makes the 31-year-old Russian athlete good at throwing events.
- (Japan) Joe Kudou: At 19, Japanese athlete Kudou is the youngest of the male competitors and thus lacks experience. He relies on his high skill levels in all event types. He wears a reversed baseball cap.
- (Jamaica) Femi Kadiena: A national record breaker in her home nation, Kadiena has come to break records on the world stage. The 24-year-old Jamaican athlete specialises in jumping events.
- (France) Ellen Reggiani: Due to her speed and stamina, Reggiani is known as the "French Express". The 20-year-old French competitor also works as a model. In others versions, her name was changed to Pilar Jimenez (as was her nationality to Spanish).
- Li Huang: The youngest competitor here at 15, Huang of China has silenced her critics, who object to her age, with her tremendous speed. She received a slight redesign in the US releases to make her appear less childish.
- (Japan) Mankichi Kazami: A hidden character available only in the Japanese version of the game on the Sega Saturn. Appears to be based on a character from a Japanese Manga comic, "Decathlon". According to the synopsis of this comic, he is a 20-year-old "yokel" with significant natural athletic ability, but very little knowledge, who simply turns up for trials for the Olympics, having never competed before.

== Development ==
DecAthlete was developed by Sega AM3. According to producer Mie Kumagai, AM3's general manager Hisao Oguchi came up with the idea to create a polygon-based sports game as the 1996 Summer Olympics in Atlanta approached. The team considered including swimming and gymnastics, but director Yoshitaka Maeyama insisted that the decathlon would suffice. The player's use of just one character to accumulate a point total was done to help differentiate the characters and to better resemble a video game score. In a May 1996 interview with Sega Saturn Magazine, director Yoshitaka Maeyama explained that the team sought to balance rapid button-pressing mechanics with events requiring more precise timing. He also discussed the challenges of designing suitable camera angles, noting that visually impressive perspectives were not always the most practical for gameplay. Events requiring precise timing consequently prioritised clearer viewpoints, while simpler disciplines allowed for more dynamic camera angles.

DecAthlete was released on the PlayStation 2 in Japan as part of the DecAthlete Collection with Winter Heat and Virtua Athlete. The collection is the 15th volume of the Sega Ages 2500 series.

== Reception ==
Reception

Review scores
Publication	Score
AllGame	4/5 (SAT)
Electronic Gaming Monthly	8.25/10 (SAT)
Next Generation	4/5 (SAT)
Sega Saturn Magazine	91% (SAT)
Power Unlimited	78%(SAT)

In Japan, Game Machine listed Decathlete on their July 1, 1996 issue as being the most-successful arcade game of the month. In the United States, it was one of the top ten highest-grossing arcade games of 1996. The console port was among the nineteen best-selling Saturn games of 1996 in the United Kingdom, according to HMV.

A reviewer for Next Generation said that compared to its rival, Konami's International Track & Field, DecAthlete has far more polygons, producing characters which are "completely smooth, crisp, and full of life." He also praised the variety of events, strong selection of modes and features, heavy distinction between the playable characters, and emphasis on timing and skill over button-mashing, which he felt set it apart from previous track-and-field games. His one criticism is that it supports up to two players, compared to International Track and Field's four players. The two sports reviewers of Electronic Gaming Monthly both commented that the game rose above simple button-mashing and had a strong sense of realism. Rob Allsetter of Sega Saturn Magazine highlighted the 60 frames per second animation, and agreed with Next Generation and EGM that, while DecAthlete does involve some button-mashing, it emphasizes skill conspicuously more than other games in the genre. He also agreed that the game's one shortcoming is that it does not support more than two players.

Reception in continental Europe was positive. French magazine Joypad awarded Athlete Kings 93%, praising its fluid presentation, technical gameplay and variety of athletics events. German magazine MAN!AC reviewed the Japanese DecAthlete version and gave it 76 out of 100, praising its graphics and presentation while offering a more reserved assessment of its overall depth. Italian magazine Console Mania was considerably more enthusiastic, awarding DecAthlete 94 out of 100. The magazine particularly praised its graphics, sound, accessibility and lasting appeal, regarding the game as both immediately enjoyable and challenging to master.

In 1997, Electronic Gaming Monthly listed the Saturn version as number 95 on their "100 Best Games of All Time", calling it "the ultimate sports game for people who aren't into sports games." They cited its excellent graphics, control, and camera angles, and the humorous characters.

== Media appearances ==
In 1996, Athlete Kings was featured on the British television programme GamesMaster, where British athletes John Regis and Tony Jarrett competed against each other using the game.

In Portugal, Athlete Kings was featured on RTP's video game competition programme CyberMaster in 1996, where contestants competed to achieve the longest long jump.

In its January–February 1997 issue, French magazine Mega Force invited Senegalese long jumper and African champion Cheikh Touré to play the long jump event in Athlete Kings. Touré praised the game's realism, particularly its depiction of athletes' movements, running technique and emotional reactions.
