= Alien Olympics =

1994 video game

Alien Olympics Alien Olympics 2044 AD
- Game Boy version cover
- Developer: Dark Technologies
- Publisher: Ocean Software
- Platforms: Game Boy, MS-DOS
- Release: September 1994
- Genre: Sports
- Modes: Single-player, multiplayer

Alien Olympics is a video game for MS-DOS developed by Dark Technologies and published by Mindscape in Europe in 1994. The game is a sports video game that imitates a range of track and field Olympic sports competed by aliens. A Europe-only Game Boy version, Alien Olympics 2044 AD, was published by Ocean Software for the Game Boy in the same year. Upon release, critics praised the game for its variety of events, although critiqued some of them for their challenge and reliance on repeated button presses.

== Gameplay ==
Players compete as Ooie Gooie, participating in 15 alien-themed events modelled after Olympic track and field sports. For instance, the Lunge, Leap Splat is a triple jump where the player taps the A and B buttons to build speed, and then before the line, presses a button to line up the angle of the jump. Other events include those resembling the sprint, pole vault, archery and shot put events. Prior to each event, a menu provides instructions on the controls needed to compete.

== Development ==
The game was first developed under the title Alien Games before using the title Alien Olympics and Olympic rings, an unlicensed reference to the Olympic Games. Mindscape showcased the game at the European Computer Trade Show in 1994.

== Reception ==
Reception

Review scores
Publication	Score	
Publication	DOS	Game Boy
Computer and Video Games		76%
Hyper	60%	
Official Nintendo Magazine		82%
Total!		73%
GB Action		82%
Games World		78%
Super Gamer		84%

Critics praised the uniqueness and range of game modes, with Super Gamer praising "the amount and variety of events". GB Action highlighted the "refreshingly broad range of games", and described many of the events as "original", although felt there was "nothing particularly new" about the core gameplay. Total! compared it as a "rehashed" version of the arcade video game Track & Field, stating the concept was "not original anymore, but unusual enough to be a breath of fresh air". The graphics and interface were also generally praised. Super Gamer enjoyed the "tripped-out space theme", but stated that the visuals "merely serve their purpose" and did not push any boundaries. GB Action and Computer & Video Games praised the "clear and helpful" user interface for providing instructions prior to each game. Total! described the graphics as "unspectacularly efficient".

Reviewers expressed mixed reviews on the challenge of the game modes, with many noting the game's reliance on button mashing to complete events. Deniz Ahmet of Computer & Video Games considered the single-player mode to not be particularly challenging, stating "most of the time you don't even need to look at the screen". Other critics, including Nintendo Official Magazine, considered the game to have "loads of challenge". Super Gamer stated the game was a "nightmare" and "tediously difficult", stating the button mashing "doesn't work particularly well on the Game Boy". Hyper described the DOS version of the game as a "dead bore".
