= Torino 2006 (video game) =

2006 video game

- Developer: 49Games
- Publisher: 2K
- Platforms: Microsoft Windows, PlayStation 2, Xbox
- Release: AU: January 20, 2006; NA: January 25, 2006; EU: January 27, 2006
- Genre: Sports
- Modes: Single-player, multiplayer

Torino 2006 is the official video game of the XX Olympic Winter Games, hosted by Turin, Italy in 2006. Developed by German studio 49Games and published by 2K (and I-play), it was released for Microsoft Windows, PlayStation 2, and Xbox. It is the first licensed Olympic video game to be released on a Microsoft home console, since a planned Xbox version of the prior installment, Salt Lake 2002, was cancelled.

== Venues ==
In the video game, the venues are based on the real life. They are:

- Sestriere Borgata - alpine skiing (downhill, super-G)
- Sestriere Colle - alpine skiing (giant slalom, slalom)
- Pragelato - ski jumping, cross-country skiing, Nordic combined
- Cesana San Sicario - biathlon
- Cesana Pariol - luge, bobsleigh
- Torino Oval Lingotto - speed skating

== Playable nations ==
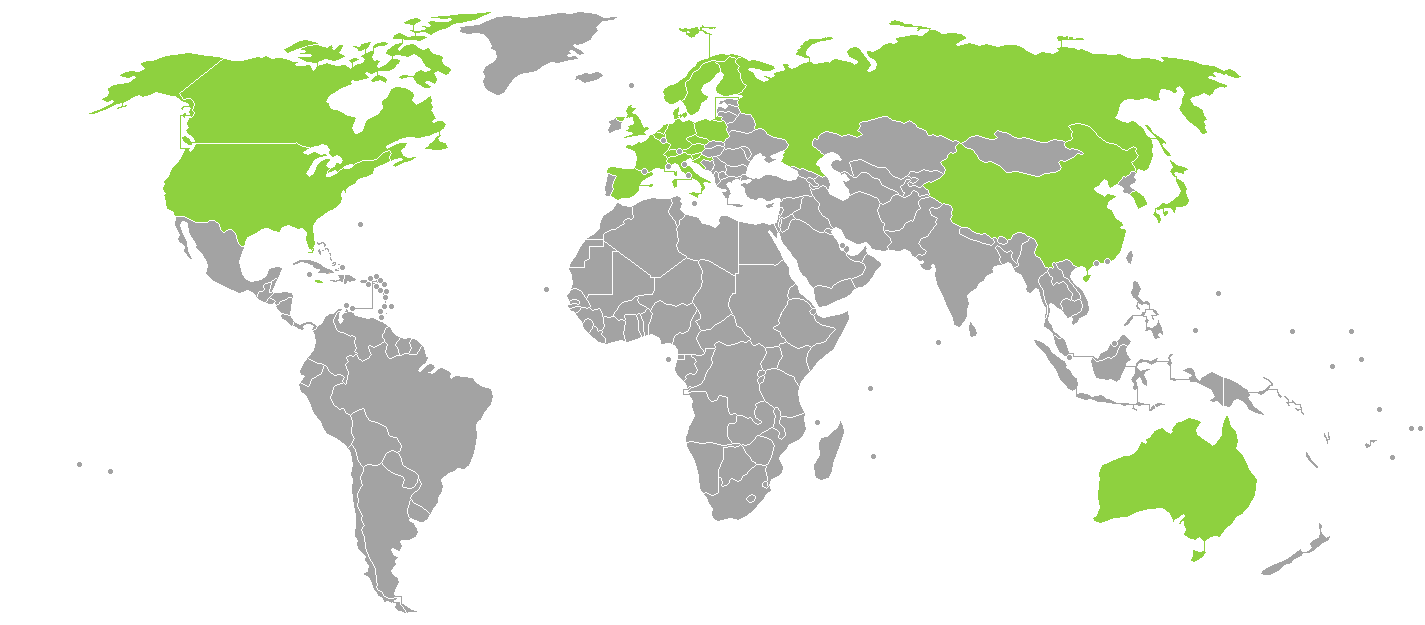
Playable countries

There is a total of 24 playable countries in the game. They are:

- Australia
- Austria
- Belgium
- Canada
- Croatia
- Czech Republic
- Denmark
- Finland
- France
- Germany
- Great Britain
- Italy
- Japan
- South Korea
- Netherlands
- Norway
- China
- Poland
- Russia
- Slovenia
- Spain
- Sweden
- Switzerland
- United States

== Specials ==
These are teams which represent other regions, and in some cases, are the same as the aforementioned nations, simply with different costumes. They can be unlocked by completing certain challenges. They are:

- Europe
- Italy
- Germany
- United States
- France
- Jamaica

== Competitions ==
In Torino 2006, you can play in a single event, 9-event competition or a 15-event competition. Alternatively, you can make your own by selecting "Customise Competition" from the main menu.

== Commentators ==
In Torino 2006, there are five languages to choose from, and each has two commentators. They are:

- English - Jeff Caster, West Westbrook
- German - Hans Joachim Peters, Volker Bogdan
- Spanish - Alejandro Gonzalez, E. Garcia
- Italian - Emilio de Marchi, Dario de Muro
- French - Jacky Nonnon, Guillaume Boullay

== Reception ==
Reception

Aggregate scores
Aggregator	Score		
Aggregator	PC	PS2	Xbox
GameRankings	46%	45%	40%
Metacritic	37/100	39/100	36/100

Review scores
Publication	Score		
Publication	PC	PS2	Xbox
AllGame	N/A	2/5	2/5
Computer Gaming World	(unfavorable)	N/A	N/A
Game Informer	N/A	4.25/10	4.25/10
GameRevolution	N/A	D−	D−
GameSpot	3.9/10	3.9/10	3.9/10
GameSpy	N/A	1/5	1/5
GameZone	N/A	5/10	4/10
IGN	4.4/10	4.4/10	4.4/10
Official U.S. PlayStation Magazine	N/A	2.5/5	N/A
Official Xbox Magazine (US)	N/A	N/A	5/10
PC Gamer (UK)	65%	N/A	N/A
Detroit Free Press	N/A	N/A	2/4
The Times	2/5	2/5	2/5

Torino 2006 received "generally unfavorable reviews" on all platforms according to the review aggregation website Metacritic.

Detroit Free Press gave the Xbox version a score of two stars out of four and said, "Button-mashing is almost nonexistent. That's a big change from Athens 2004, the last Olympics game I played, which required you to hit buttons frantically to make your athlete move." The Times gave the game two stars out of five and said, "The result in single-player mode is a messy, unresponsive mass of button-pushing and frantic joystick-twiddling that evolves from impossible to challenging to repetitive and dull in less than an hour." The Sydney Morning Herald gave it one-and-a-half stars out of five and said that the game "makes it about as exciting as lying in an empty bath and pretending it's the luge, or sticking your head in the freezer and singing Advance Australia Fair." The A.V. Club gave it an F and called it "a game more excruciating than an evening of ice-dancing preliminaries."
