= Track & Field II =

1988 video game

- North American cover art
- Developer: Konami
- Publisher: Konami
- Programmers: Masahiro Ueno; Yoshiaki Yamada
- Artist: Kazuhito Ogikubo
- Platform: Nintendo Entertainment System
- Release: JP: September 16, 1988; NA: February 1989; EU: November 22, 1989
- Genre: Sports
- Modes: Single-player, multiplayer

Track & Field II, known in Japan as Konami Sports in Seoul, is a sequel to Track & Field created by Konami for the NES in 1988. (Note: Although it is the fourth game in the series, it is the second for the NES (and a follow-up to the previous NES game), hence the title.) It still continues the Olympic-themed sports events, but adds more realism by choosing a country for the player to represent. The series boasted 15 sporting events, with two of them available as bonus stages between rounds of the "Olympic" mode.

The game was profiled in the November–December 1988 issue of Nintendo Power and slated for a December 1988 release in North America; however, it was delayed to February 1989. (Note: The North American release date is sometimes given as June 1989, but the game was available by May 1989 when Computer Entertainer included it in its best-selling console games chart.)

== Game modes ==
- Training is a basic training of the events to test out the abilities of the player in each event.
- Olympic is the story mode of the game where the player represents his or her country and competes with the world's best.
- Versus is where two players compete head-to-head in the sporting events.

== Sporting events ==
- Fencing
- Triple jump
- Freestyle Swimming
- High Dive
- Clay Pigeon Shooting
- Hammer throw
- Taekwondo
- Pole vault
- Canoeing
- Archery
- Hurdles
- Horizontal Bar
- Hang Gliding (bonus event)
- Arm wrestling in Versus Mode only (in Exhibition against a computer in the Japanese version)
- Gun Firing (bonus event; not available in the Japanese version)

The triple jump, freestyle swimming, clay pigeon shooting, pole vault, and archery events were previously featured in Hyper Sports. The hammer throw and hurdles events were originally featured in the original Track and Field. Although gymnastics was featured in Hyper Sports, that game had the vaulting horse rather than the horizontal bar.

== Countries ==
- Argentina
- Australia
- Belgium
- Bolivia
- Brazil
- Bulgaria
- Cameroon
- Canada
- China
- Central African Republic
- Ecuador
- France
- West Germany
- Great Britain
- Iran
- Iraq
- Japan
- Kenya
- South Korea
- Liberia
- Poland
- Portugal
- Senegal
- Slovenia
- Spain
- Sweden
- Soviet Union
- United States

== Extras ==
The game has a password feature allowing the player to continue playing from their last position at another time. In addition, the Gun Firing exhibition event could be played with either the NES Controller or the NES Zapper.

== Reception ==
The game topped the bi-weekly Japanese Famitsu sales chart in October 1988, dethroning Dragon Ball: Daimaō Fukkatsu. It also appeared at number 9 out of 15 on the best-selling console games chart in the May 1989 issue of Computer Entertainer in the United States.

The game entered Nintendo Power's Top 30 games survey of players, professionals, and dealers at number 5 in the May–June 1989 issue. It was praised for its vibrant graphics and varied gameplay in the April 1989 issue of Computer Entertainer, scoring 7.5 out of 8 stars.
