= Sydney 2000 (video game) =

2000 video game

- European PC cover art
- Developer: Attention to Detail
- Publisher: Eidos Interactive
- Platforms: PlayStation, Microsoft Windows, Dreamcast
- Release: PlayStation, Windows; 22 August 2000; Dreamcast: NA: 28 August 2000; EU: 4 September 2000
- Genre: Sports
- Modes: Single-player, multiplayer

Sydney 2000 is the official video game of the Games of the XXVII Olympiad, hosted by Sydney, Australia in 2000. Developed by Attention to Detail and published by Eidos Interactive, it was released for the PlayStation, Microsoft Windows and Dreamcast. There were versions developed for the Nintendo 64 and Game Boy Color, but both versions were cancelled.

== Events ==
- 100 m sprint
- 110 m hurdles
- Javelin (F)
- Hammer
- Triple Jump
- High Jump (F)
- Skeet shooting
- Super Heavyweight Weight Lifting
- 100 m Freestyle Swimming (F)
- 10 m Platform Diving (F)
- Chase Cycling
- Kayak K1 Slalom

== Playable nations ==
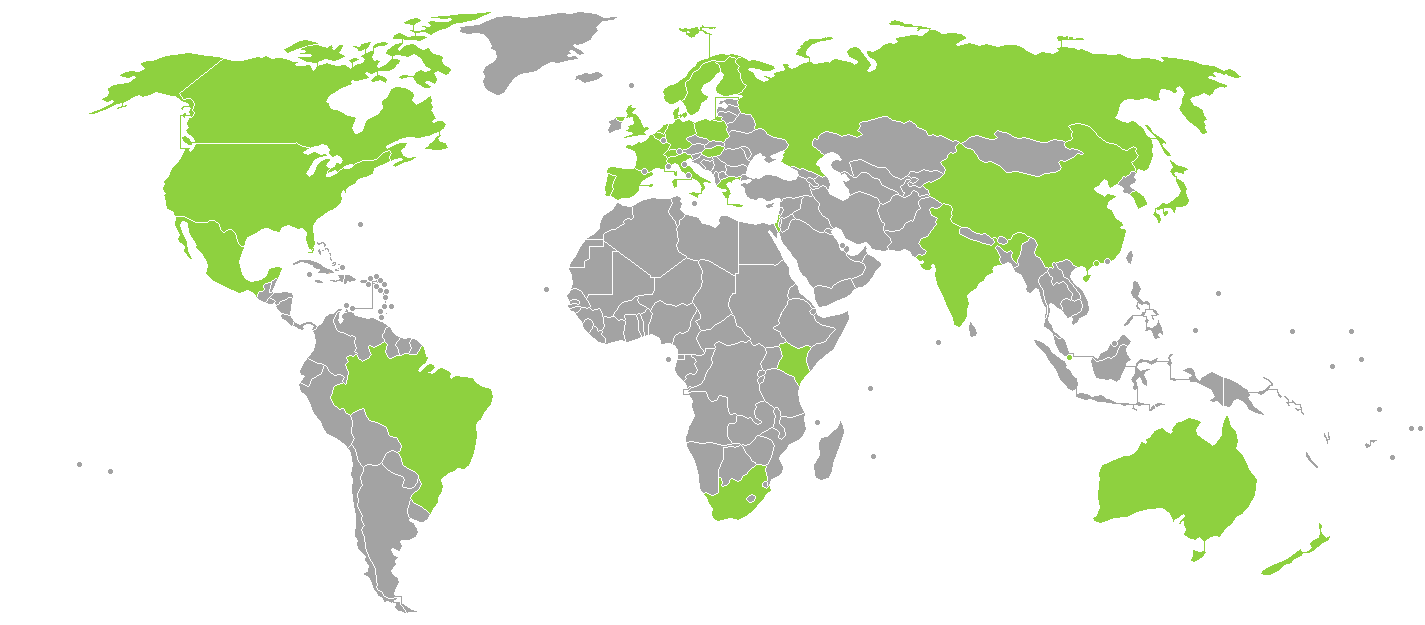
Playable countries

Up to 32 countries were available to be played on the game. They are:

- Australia
- Belgium
- Brazil
- Canada
- China
- Denmark
- Finland
- France
- (United Kingdom) Great Britain
- Germany
- Greece
- Hungary
- India
- Israel
- Italy
- Japan
- Kenya
- South Korea
- Mexico
- Netherlands
- Norway
- New Zealand
- Poland
- Portugal
- Russia
- South Africa
- Singapore
- Spain
- Switzerland
- Sweden
- Chinese Taipei
- United States of America

== Gameplay ==
Gameplay screenshot of Skeet Shooting

Although the button mashing-laden gameplay has not changed from previous games, the main competition itself become more complex with the inclusion of the Virtual Gym and a complete Olympics qualifying tour, composed by four stages, and the player can only run for the medals of the events they qualified for. While some of the events are the women's, each event is only set to one gender: it is not possible to run the women's 100 m hurdles or the men's high jump.

Individually, there is not much difference in gameplay from previous games: two action buttons control speed a third performs an extra action, such as jumping, passing a hurdle, setting the angle and releasing the hammer or javelin, or touching the wall. All events rely on this formula, except Skeet, K1 Slalom, and diving (which uses "click-a-long" rather than the freeform jumping of Olympic Gold). Chase Cycling also requires pacing by the player, or the final cyclist will run out of long pace before the final sprint.

The biggest difference from previous games in the series lies in the Olympic mode: instead of starting in the Olympics, the player must improve and qualify an athlete for the event. Each event has four stages (Open Trials, Invitation Event, The Championship, and Olympic Class), and for each stage the player must complete minigames in the Cyber Gym that range from running on a treadmill, climbing a pole, squats or reaction training, for a total of 20 minigames. Completing a Cyber Gym game improves the athlete in one of the three ratings temporarily, and to earn the new capacities definitively, the athlete must complete an event with a certain score. After the player is happy with the athlete's development, they can try to qualify for the next stage by running against other athletes at the same level. Although it is possible to compete in the Olympics as soon as the athlete reaches the Olympic Class, to get a perfect athlete (with 100% on all ratings) one must complete all minigames, including those on Olympic Class. As the game relies mostly on athletes' ratings, even players with lower button presses per minute can make World Record times without serious effort as long as they passed all the mini games. Other modes include an arcade mode, training and head to head, where two players can compete with their Olympic mode trained athletes. There are four difficulty levels.

Although generally stable, the game lacks tweaking in some events: the High jump uses men's results, and while some events such as the 100 m sprint and triple jump are quite easy, others such as the javelin and hammer throw require much training.

== Reception ==
Reception

Aggregate score
Aggregator	Score		
Aggregator	Dreamcast	PC	PS
Metacritic	53/100	51/100	57/100

Review scores
Publication	Score		
Publication	Dreamcast	PC	PS
AllGame	2.5/5	2.5/5	N/A
CNET Gamecenter	4/10	3/10	5/10
Computer Gaming World	N/A	2/5	N/A
Electronic Gaming Monthly	4.83/10 (Note: Two critics of Electronic Gaming Monthly gave the Dreamcast version each a score of 5/10, and the other gave it 4.5/10.)	N/A	4/10
Eurogamer	N/A	8/10	6/10
Famitsu	27/40	N/A	26/40
Game Informer	3.5/10	N/A	2.75/10
GameRevolution	C−	C−	D+
GameSpot	5.6/10	4.2/10	5.8/10
GameSpy	2/10	35%	N/A
IGN	6/10	6.4/10	5/10
Next Generation	2/5	N/A	N/A
Official U.S. PlayStation Magazine	N/A	N/A	2/5
PC Gamer (US)	N/A	52%	N/A

Sydney 2000 received "mixed" reviews on all platforms according to the review aggregation website Metacritic. In Japan, where the Dreamcast and PlayStation versions were ported for release and published by Capcom on 26 October 2000, Famitsu gave it a score of 27 out of 40 for the former, and 26 out of 40 for the latter. GameZone gave the PC version a score of nine out of ten and said, "The graphical quality of this program makes it a sure-fire winner. What it lacks in some areas, it makes up for in others. If you are a fan of Olympic-style action, this is a must-have." However, Computer Games Strategy Plus gave it one-and-a-half stars out of five and said that it was "a prime example of a game that should have stayed where it belonged--on the consoles," and that the game "simply isn't much fun; most of the time, it isn't any fun at all. It feels more like work than a good time and that's never a good recipe for success."

Edge gave the Dreamcast and PC versions each a score of seven out of ten, saying that the game was "as faithful an exponent of [the key-bashing dynamic] as any of Decathlon's distant children." Colin Williamson of PC Gamer US criticised the button mashing-gameplay and frustration game control of the latter version, and stated, "All in all, Sydney's quality is disturbingly inconsistent, and there are, sadly, more bad games than good in this particular collection. If you want to recreate the Olympic experience, break into the local high school track and run a few laps, or hop into the La-Z-Boy with a big tub of popcorn and leave it to the professionals." Kevin Rice of NextGen called the former version "A weekend rental at best. It's somewhat amusing to relive childhood memories of the local arcade, but the game's lack of depth and repetitive game mechanics grow old quickly."

Cheat Monkey of GamePro said of the PlayStation version, "If you're hankering for some Olympic competition and want to go beyond the standard track and field events, Sydney 2000 is a decent pick. It's not a gold medal winner, but it finishes the PlayStation invitational with a bronze." (Note: GamePro gave the PlayStation version three 3/5 scores for graphics, sound, and fun factor, and 2.5/5 for control.) He then said of the Dreamcast version, "Overall, Sydney 2000 for the Dreamcast is a better game than the PlayStation version in more ways than one, but it's still held to a bronze medal finish in the sports games category. If you've got Olympic fever, Sydney 2000 will carry the torch for you, but only so far." (Note: GamePro gave the Dreamcast version three 3/5 scores for graphics, sound, and control, and 3.5/5 for fun factor.) Brian Wright, however, said of the PC version, "It seems that as long as computers continue to exist, companies will continue to release decathlon-style games. The button-mashing game mechanics may appeal to novice gamers or those on a nostalgia kick, but the familiar and repetitive gameplay means that Sydney 2000 doesn't get the gold." (Note: GamePro gave the PC version 3.5/5 for graphics, sound, control, and fun factor.)

== Notes ==
Preceded by Olympic Summer Games	Official videogame of the Summer Olympic Games	Succeeded by Athens 2004
