= Nagano Winter Olympics '98 =

1997 video game

- European PlayStation box art
- Developers: Konami Computer Entertainment Osaka; Konami Computer Entertainment Tokyo
- Publisher: Konami
- Director: Satoshi Kushibuchi
- Designer: Masaki Hosoe
- Composers: Soshiro Hokkai; Akira Yamaoka; Keiko Fukami
- Platforms: PlayStation, Nintendo 64
- Release: JP: December 18, 1997; NA: January 29, 1998; EU: February 1998
- Genre: Sports
- Modes: Single-player, multiplayer

Nagano Winter Olympics '98, known in Japan as Hyper Olympics in Nagano (ハイパーオリンピック イン ナガノ, Haipā Orinpikku in Nagano), is a multi-event sports game from Konami. It is based on the 1998 Winter Olympics and features 10 Olympic events including skating, skiing, luge, bobsleigh, slalom, curling, halfpipe and snowboarding. The game is part of the Track & Field/Hyper Sports series and would be the last licensed Olympic video game released on a Nintendo home console until Mario & Sonic at the Olympic Games about nine years later.

== Gameplay ==
There are two modes of play, Olympic and Championship. In the Olympic Mode, the player selects an event and competes in order to win the gold medal. In championship, the player competes in seven events, with points being awarded for performance in each event. The athlete with the most points at the end wins gold.

== Events ==
- Alpine Skiing - Downhill, Super G (PS1 only), and Giant Slalom
- Snowboard - Giant Slalom and Halfpipe (N64 only)
- Speed Skating - 500m and 1500m
- Short Track (PS1 only) - 500 m and 1000 m
- Bobsleigh
- Luge
- Ski Jumping - Large Jumping (PS1 only), K90 (N64 Only) and K120 (N64 only)
- Freestyle Skiing - Aerials
- Curling

== Playable nations ==
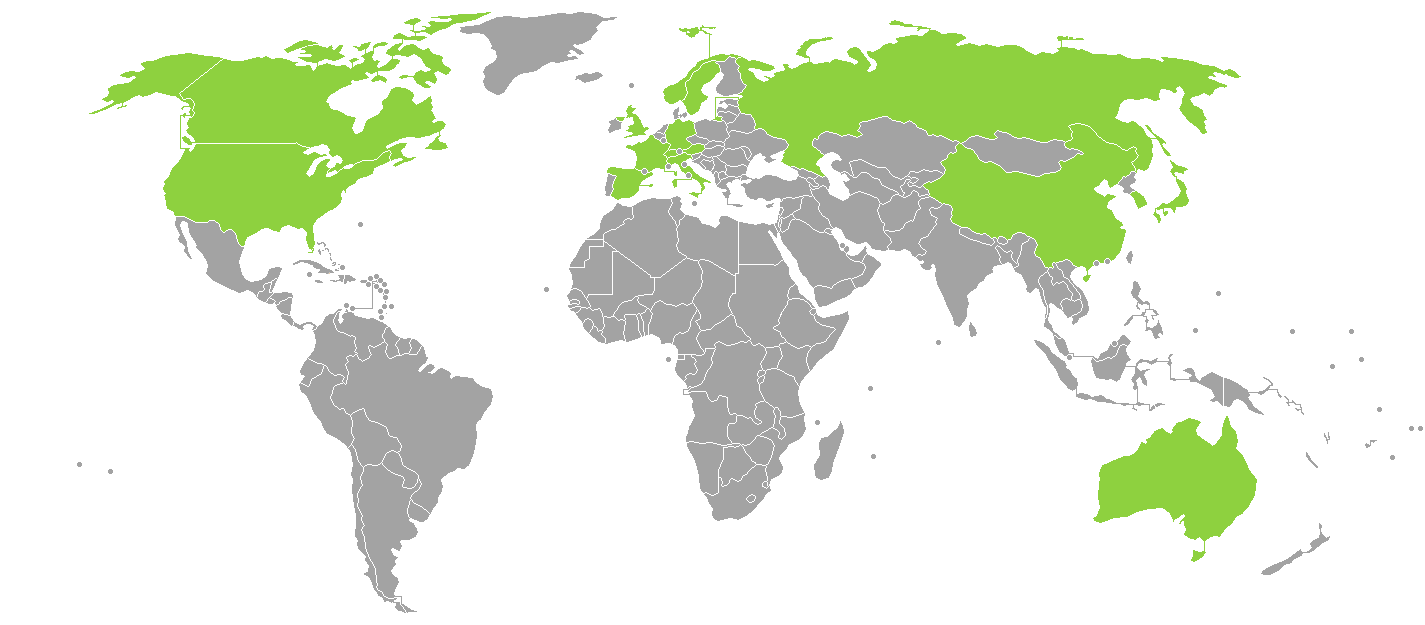
Playable countries

There is a total of 16 playable countries per version of the game. They are:

- Australia
- Austria
- Canada
- China (PS1 only)
- Finland (N64 only)
- France
- Germany
- Great Britain
- Italy
- Japan
- Netherlands (N64 Only)
- Norway
- South Korea (PS1 only)
- Russia
- Spain
- Sweden
- Switzerland
- United States

== Development ==
Both the PlayStation and Nintendo 64 versions of the game were developed by Konami's Japanese branch, but by different divisions of it. A playable demo of the Nintendo 64 version was exhibited at the September 1997 Tokyo Game Show.

== Reception ==
Reception

Aggregate score
Aggregator	Score	
Aggregator	N64	PS
GameRankings	48%	49%

Review scores
Publication	Score	
Publication	N64	PS
AllGame	2/5	N/A
Edge	6/10	5/10
Electronic Gaming Monthly	4.5/10, 5/10, 4.5/10, 5.5/10	4.625/10
Famitsu	25/40	N/A
Game Informer	5.5/10	5/10
GameFan	67% (Note: In GameFan's viewpoint of the Nintendo 64 version, one critic gave it 65, and the other 69.)	59% (Note: In GameFan's viewpoint of the PlayStation version, one critic gave it 60, and the other 58.)
GameRevolution	N/A	B+
GameSpot	3.5/10	3.3/10
Hyper	60%	60%
IGN	4.2/10	3/10
N64 Magazine	32%	N/A
Next Generation	N/A	3/5
Nintendo Power	6.5/10	N/A
Official U.S. PlayStation Magazine	N/A	2/5

Nagano Winter Olympics '98 received unfavorable reviews. The Nintendo 64 version and PlayStation version respectively held a 48% and 49% on the review aggregation website GameRankings, but those critics which compared the two versions unanimously declared the Nintendo 64 version the superior one, citing faster play, shorter load times, and better graphics with less polygon breakup and draw in than the PlayStation version. GamePro went so far as to give the Nintendo 64 version a positive recommendation, giving it 4 out of 5 scores in graphics, control, and fun factor, and a 3.5 in sound. The reviewer argued that while the game has substantial flaws, such as lack of a practice mode and difficulty select and the passive controls of some of the events, the fun of the multiplayer competition makes it a good value. Next Generation called the PlayStation version "a mixed bag. The graphics and sound are great, and about half of the events are dead on, but the rest rarely rise above mediocrity. All multi-event discs have clunkers, though, and the fun delivered by other events makes this game worth a look in the end."

Other publications were more negative. The most commonly cited problem, regardless of the reviewer's overall opinion of the game, is that the controls for many of the events are so simplistic that the player feels no connection to the action occurring onscreen. GameSpot described the resultant gameplay as "about as tough as answering a phone when it rings" and summed up the game as "an unmixed bag of terrible, underdeveloped games whose feeble, undernourished gameplay comes down to timing one or two button taps, not just per race, but per event". Crispin Boyer wrote in Electronic Gaming Monthly that "Most of NWO '98's 12 difficult events are neither fun nor exciting, and much of the blame falls on the uninspired control setups."

IGN and GamePro both praised the sound effects in the Nintendo 64 version, with IGN's Peer Schneider commenting, "The sound effects are as good as they get, with accurate stereo separation, surround effects, and clear samples. The bob sleigh and ski noises are especially convincing. Without a doubt, Nagano Winter Olympics is one of the best sounding games on the N64 yet. Too bad the gameplay lags behind."

Some reviewers found the selection of events uneven. GamePro, reviewing the PlayStation version (which, unlike the Nintendo 64 version, they suggested as a rental only), said that some events are boring. (Note: GamePro gave the PlayStation version two 3.5/5 scores for graphics and fun factor, 3/5 for sound, and 4/5 for control.) Critics overwhelmingly said that the curling is the best event, with most commenting that this is rather unexpected given what an obscure sport curling is.
