= Decathlon (1992 video game) =

- Developer(s): C&E
- Publisher(s): C&E
- Platform(s): Nintendo Entertainment System
- Release: 1992
- Genre(s): Sports

Decathlon is a decathlon-themed sports video game developed by C&E for the Nintendo Entertainment System, and published in 1992.

== Gameplay ==
The game offers two modes of play: "Single Game" and "Full Game". In Single Game mode, the player competes in one single event; in a Full Game, the player competes in all decathlon events in a preset sequence: 100 metres, long jump, shot put, high jump, 400 metres, 110 metres hurdles, discus throw, pole vault, javelin throw, and 1500 metres. The game awards points based on player performance. In a full game, the player with the high score is the winner.

After choosing a mode of play, the player chooses a player character from a list of representatives from eight countries:

Country	No.	Name	Score
GBR	457	Tommy	8847
FRA	346	Flaziat	8652
GER	476	Shaek	8848
AUS	48	Shirzy	8036
United States	1076	Opalin	8812
CAN	176	Stein	8328
NEP	783	Kanei	7983
TPE	1004	Leeyon	7976

== See also ==
- Olympic Decathlon (1980)
- The Activision Decathlon (1983)
- Track & Field (1983)
- Stadium Events (1986)
- Olympic Gold (1992)
