= Winter Heat =

1997 video game

- Sega Saturn PAL box cover
- Developers: Sega AM3; Data East (Saturn)
- Publisher: Sega
- Platforms: Arcade, Sega Saturn, PlayStation 2
- Release: Arcade: JP: 1997; Saturn: JP: February 5, 1998; EU: February 6, 1998; NA: February 27, 1998; PlayStation 2: JP: July 29, 2004
- Genre: Sports
- Modes: Single-player, multiplayer
- Arcade system: ST-V

Winter Heat (Note: Winter Heat (ウィンターヒート, Wintā Hīto)) is a sports video game developed by Sega AM3 and published by Sega for arcades in 1997, and for the Sega Saturn in 1998, featuring the license for the 1998 Winter Olympics that were celebrated in Nagano, Japan. It is the sequel to the 1996 Sega game DecAthlete. Winter Heat was released on the PlayStation 2 in Japan as part of the DecAthlete Collection with DecAthlete and Virtua Athlete. The collection is the 15th volume of the Sega Ages 2500 series.

== Gameplay ==
Like Decathlete, Winter Heat features a number of different events to play in, most of them revolving around rapid button pressing and timed button taps. Players choose from eight fictional international athletes, each with their own particular skill focus. Six of the athletes return from DecAthlete, while the two newcomers are Johann Stensen, a Norwegian Nordic skiing specialist, and B.B., a masked British speed skater. The arcade version features eight events: speed skiing, ski jumping, downhill skiing, short-track speed skating, slalom, bobsleigh, speed skating and cross-country skiing.

The Saturn version expanded the arcade game's eight events to eleven, adding snowboarding, ski aerials and skeleton. It also supports competitions involving up to four players through the console's multitap accessory, alongside options for customising tournaments. An additional reference gallery contains character profiles, explanations of the sporting events and promotional artwork relating to Winter Heat and DecAthlete.

== Development ==
Winter Heat was developed by the in-house team Sega AM3. The arcade version and Saturn port were developed in tandem. In an October 1997 interview with Sega Saturn Magazine, producer Mie Kumagai explained that, following the success of DecAthlete, the developers wanted to create a different type of sports game, taking advantage of interest in winter sports ahead of the 1998 Winter Olympics. The team sought to emphasise the distinctive sense of speed and exhilaration associated with winter competitions. In a subsequent interview, the developers revealed that Winter Heat was handled by a different team from its predecessor, although its members were fans of the original game. The director explained that the control scheme was deliberately simplified, limiting players to no more than two simultaneous inputs to make the various sporting events more accessible.

== Reception ==
Reception

Aggregate score
Aggregator	Score
GameRankings	78% (SAT)

Review scores
Publication	Score
Consoles +	91%
Computer and Video Games	4/5 (SAT)
Edge	8/10 (SAT)
Electronic Gaming Monthly	9.125/10 (SAT)
Famitsu	32/40 (SAT)
Game Informer	8.5/10
GameFan	87% (Note: In GameFan's viewpoint of the Saturn version, one critic gave it a score of 84, and the other 89.)
GameRevolution	B
GameSpot	5.7/10 (SAT)
Hyper	64%
Joypad	93%
Sega Saturn Magazine	92% (SAT)

The Sega Saturn version was positively received by critics, and held a 78% on the review aggregation website GameRankings based on four reviews. Critics widely praised the simple and natural controls, and the attractive and well-animated high resolution graphics. GameSpot explained that "Despite its simplicity and the immediate potential for carpal tunnel syndrome, Winter Heat succeeds at providing a fun and varied batch of snowy competitions. It does this by employing fairly consistent controls through a varied series of games. The speed button remains the speed button throughout, and so on. As a result, it's not such a headache to go from one competition to the next, and the package is tied together better than the competition's."

GamePro called it "a fun, finger-jamming winter sports game". (Note: GamePro gave the Saturn version 4.5/5 for graphics, 3.5/5 for sound, 4.0/5 for control, and 4.5/5 for fun factor.) Sega Saturn Magazine criticized the bordered display on the PAL conversion, but said the three Saturn-exclusive events are as good or better than the eight events of the arcade version, which in conjunction with the four-player capability gives the game enough longevity to stand up as a console game. GameSpot and Sega Saturn Magazine both also gave particular praise to the sense of speed in the bobsled event. John Ricciardi of Electronic Gaming Monthly (EGM) remarked that "Winter Heat is far and away the best of this year's Winter Olympics-style games. Each event requires different techniques with the control pad, and they're all a lot of fun." EGM gave Winter Heat their "Game of the Month" award, with three of the four members of their review team giving it a 9 out of 10 or better.

Reception in continental Europe was generally positive. French magazine Joypad awarded Winter Heat 93%, praising the variety of events, technical presentation and multiplayer appeal, and describing it as one of the Saturn's strongest multi-event sports games. German magazine MAN!AC gave the game 82 out of 100, praising its dynamic presentation, range of events and accessibility, while noting that some disciplines were more successful than others. Italian magazine Mega Console was more reserved, awarding the game 78 out of 100. The publication praised its graphics and sound but considered the gameplay and longevity less impressive, regarding it as an enjoyable but comparatively modest follow-up to Athlete Kings. Finnish magazine Super Power awarded the game 89 out of 100, praising its accessible controls, visual presentation and variety of events, although it criticised the uneven quality of certain disciplines, particularly slalom. Reviewer Joonas considered it slightly inferior to Athlete Kings, but nevertheless regarded it as the best winter sports game available at the time.
