= New International Track & Field =

2008 video game

- Developer: Sumo Digital
- Publisher: Konami
- Composers: Allister Brimble, John Broomhall, Anthony N. Putson
- Platform: Nintendo DS
- Release: EU: June 20, 2008; AU: July 4, 2008; NA: July 22, 2008; JP: July 24, 2008
- Genre: Sports
- Modes: Single-player, multiplayer

New International Track & Field (Note: Known in Japan as New International Hyper Sports DS (New International ハイパースポーツDS, Nyū Intanashonaru Haipā Supōtsu Dī Esu).) is a sports video game by Konami for the Nintendo DS. Developed by Sumo Digital, it is the final game in Konami's Track and Field series.

== Overview ==
New International Track & Field features single-player career and training modes in addition to Wi-Fi multi-player between 2 and 4 players, a character-based minigame challenge mode and a worldwide player ranking system. The original Track and Field game is also available to play.

The gameplay of New International Track & Field differs from the traditional button mashing and joystick-wiggling gameplay of the original games in that players use the motion of the stylus to set a rhythm for their character. In addition, the game also features uses for the DS' dual screens and players can shout encouragement for their character via the microphone to give them an extra boost. The louder they shout, the bigger the boost.

New International Track & Field featured an online community at their website. Players could link their games to their website accounts and participate in online global scoreboards, teams, and tournaments. The site also used to feature forums for discussion about the game.

=== Sports ===
24 events are featured in the game:

- 100 Metre Sprint
- Long Jump
- 110 Metre Hurdles
- Skeet Shooting
- Weightlifting
- 400 Metre Distance
- Steeplechase
- Archery
- Javelin
- Cycling
- Triple Jump
- Hammer
- Discus
- Shot Put
- Breaststroke
- 100 Metre Backstroke
- High jump
- High dive
- Double trap
- Springboard
- Pole vault
- Rowing
- Horizontal bar

== Characters ==
New International Track & Field features a roster of 10 original characters and eight established Konami characters for a total of 18. The characters are drawn in a super deformed art style designed by comic company UDON. Additional costumes and accessories are also unlockable. Characters include:

- Ashley
- Claudia
- Dirk
- Evil Rose (Rumble Roses)
- Frogger (Frogger)
- Helga
- Kang
- Kiko
- Ming Ming
- Oolong (Yie Ar Kung-Fu)
- Pentarou (Parodius)
- Power Pro-kun (Power Pros)
- Pyramid Head (Silent Hill)
- The Referee
- Simon Belmont (Castlevania)
- Solid Snake (Metal Gear)
- Sparkster (Rocket Knight Adventures)
- Yoko

== Reception ==
Reception

Aggregate score
Aggregator	Score
Metacritic	73/100

Review scores
Publication	Score
Edge	7/10
Eurogamer	8/10
Famitsu	25/40
Game Informer	6.25/10
GamePro	3.5/5
GameSpot	7/10
IGN	(US) 8.7/10 (UK) 8.5/10
NGamer	65%
Nintendo Power	8/10
VideoGamer.com	8/10

The game received "average" reviews according to the review aggregation website Metacritic. In Japan, Famitsu gave it a score of one six, one seven, one five, and one seven, for a total of 25 out of 40.

The game was awarded as the Best Sports Game for the Nintendo DS by IGN in their 2008 video game awards. IGN also made it a nominee for Best Local Multiplayer Game for the Nintendo DS.
