= International Track & Field =

1996 video game

- European PAL cover art
- Developer: Konami
- Publisher: Konami
- Director: Satoshi Kushibuchi
- Programmer: Akihiro Imamura
- Artists: Keiichiro Toyama; Shigeru Kobayashi
- Platforms: PlayStation, Arcade, Game Boy Color, PlayStation Network
- Release: May 10, 1996: PlayStation; NA: May 10, 1996; JP: June 28, 1996; PAL: June, 1996 Arcade; JP: June 1996 Game Boy Color; JP: July 1, 1999; EU: November 1999; NA: January 19, 2000 PlayStation Network; PAL: August 21, 2008; NA: November 25, 2009
- Genre: Sports
- Modes: Single-player, multiplayer

International Track & Field, known in Japan as Hyper Olympic in Atlanta, (Note: Japanese: ハイパーオリンピック イン アトランタ, Hepburn: Haipāorinpikku in Atoranta) is a 3D update of Konami's Track & Field series, in which up to four players compete in eleven different Olympic events. The game was released for the PlayStation and arcades in 1996. The arcade version was released only in Japan as Hyper Athlete. A Game Boy Color game was released in 1999. It was known in Japan as Hyper Olympic Track & Field GB and International Track & Field in Europe and North America. In 2008 the game was released on PlayStation Network as a PS one Classic. All six events from the first game, 1983's Track & Field, are included, but only three events (swimming, pole vault and triple jump) are taken from the sequel, Hyper Sports. International Track & Field uses the three-button control system of its predecessors (two run buttons and one action button per player) and the eleven disciplines can be attempted in any order.

== Gameplay ==
Players compete in the real-life events 100m sprint, long jump, shot put, 100m free style, 110m hurdle, high jump, hammer, triple jump, javelin, pole vault, and discus. Twelve countries are available for representation: United States, Russia, Germany, China, Cuba, South Korea, France, Australia, Canada, United Kingdom, Japan and Kenya.

=== Evolution of control and game techniques ===
Due to the button mashing nature of the game, speed was of the essence in order to achieve a high score in the game. Due to the shape of the PlayStation Controller, the Otter Technique developed in an ergonomic fashion as the player started to adjust controller positioning during the game. To perform the technique the player must hold the pad slightly diagonally with the left hand holding the controller just above the action buttons to the right of the cable. The left thumb would be placed over one of the run buttons, while the fingers formed a fulcrum or balance point below the pad. The right hand would loosely grip the right hand side handle, with the right thumb placed over the second run button. As the player begins the 'run' the left hand remains still, while the right hand moves up and down.

As it does so, the balance point of the left fingers enables the pad to rock up and down at an electric pace, all the while allowing the run buttons to be pressed exactly one after the other repeatedly and at high speed. This effectively doubles pressing speed as each movement of the right hand will result in the static left thumb pressing the second button.

It has been noted that there are very few video games that have required the players to manipulate standard control techniques in order to best the game mechanics put in place. The first obvious incarnation of this type of adaptation was Daley Thompson's Decathlon, also an athletics game, in which gamers were forced to shake the joystick side to side to increase the speed of their characters. Gaming controller techniques have caused some controversy due to medical concerns, resulting in the establishment of websites such as the eSports Healthcare website to ensure maximum safety for gamers.

== Reception ==
Reception

Review scores
Publication	Score
Electronic Gaming Monthly	7/10
IGN	7/10
Next Generation	4/5
PlayStation Official Magazine – UK	8/10
The Electric Playground	9/10
Maximum	4/5

In Japan, Game Machine listed International Track & Field on their August 1, 1996 issue as being the fourth most-successful arcade game of the month.

In the United Kingdom, it was among the nineteen best-selling PlayStation games of 1996, according to HMV.

International Track & Field received generally positive reviews, with the four-player competitive mode drawing the most praise. The two sports reviewers of Electronic Gaming Monthly both gave the game a 7 out of 10. Dindo Perez said that the game is fun, especially with four player multiplayer, but loses its appeal after extensive play, while Todd Morwatt commented that the game has a good assortment of Olympic-style events and a "strong" graphics despite not having official license. Writing in Maximum, Daniel Jevons remarked that as with most games in the genre, the gameplay is fairly simple, but that the fierce competitiveness of four-player sessions makes the game one of the best social experiences on the PlayStation. Johnny Ballgame of GamePro said that the game has a terrific traditional gameplay enhanced by "gold-medal" 32-bit graphics. He particularly noted the easy to learn but difficult to master gameplay, fiercely competitive multiplayer, and dramatic animations. IGN praised the graphics as "awesome". A reviewer for Next Generation praised detailed 3D graphics and 12-event roster, and called it the best track-and-field sports sim for PlayStation.
