= Konami '88 =

1988 video game

- Japanese arcade flyer
- Developer(s): Konami
- Publisher(s): Konami
- Platform(s): Arcade
- Release: 1988
- Genre(s): Sports
- Mode(s): Single-player, multiplayer

Konami '88, released as '88 Games in North America and as Hyper Sports Special in Japan, is a 1988 Olympic-themed arcade sports video game developed and published by Konami. It is the third game in the Track & Field series by Konami, where players test their Olympic skills against other world-class athletes. As the title implies, it is loosely based on (but not licensed by) the 1988 Summer Olympics in Seoul, South Korea.

== Gameplay ==
The objective of the game is to compete in a series of Olympic events and beat the other players. The player must achieve the gold medal in each event in order to qualify for the next or the game will end. The events are played in the following order:

- 100m Dash: Players race against other athletes as well as the clock. This is just a warm-up compared to the events to come.
- Long Jump: Players dash to the line, leaps, and propels his body as far as he is able. The player controls the speed and angle of the jump.
- 400m Relay (qualifying heat): Speed and timing are crucial in this event. Player must coordinate the baton hand-off perfectly for the best qualifying time.
- Skeet Shooting: Players can aim left and right at the clay pigeons and must prove that he is a sure shot. A chance for bonus points is given for excellent marksmanship.
- 110m Hurdles: Players sprint down the track, timing his jumps perfectly to clear all of the hurdles and reach the finish line in time.
- Archery: This is a trial of the player's proficiency in using a bow and arrow. The player can decide the direction and force of the wind, which will help in demonstrating his skill as a sharpshooter.
- Javelin: The player darts to the line and throws the javelin with all his might. The player controls the height of the javelin.
- High Jump: Another test of speed and strength as the player runs to the line and hurls his body over the bar. The player can control his angle above the bar.
- 400m Relay - The Final Race: The final test of physical training as the player faces the challenging relay again.

Title screen of Konami '88

=== Tips ===
- 100 Meter Dash: Both players finish at the same time = +3000 pts.
- Long Jump: Jumping a distance of 6.66 meters = +3000pts.
- 110 Meter Hurdles: Both players finish at the same time = +3000 pts.
- Javelin Throw:
- Skeet Shooting: Shooting every plate and a flying saucer will fly across the screen. A bird will appear and the player can shoot it twice and earn +5000 per hit. The player can achieve max score of 18200.
- Archery: Getting a bullseye on the last shot and unlocking a bonus shot at a cat with an apple on its head.
- High Jump: Making every jump without missing at all + 3000 pts.

== Reception ==
In Japan, Game Machine listed Konami '88 on their September 1, 1988 issue as being the twenty-second most-successful table arcade unit of the month.
