= Hyper Sports =

1984 video game

- North American arcade flyer
- Developer: Konami
- Publishers: WW: Konami; NA: Centuri
- Platforms: Arcade, Amstrad CPC, BBC Micro, Commodore 64, MSX, ZX Spectrum, SG-1000
- Release: JP: May 12, 1984; NA: May 1984; EU: July 1984
- Genre: Sports
- Modes: Single-player, multiplayer

Hyper Sports, known in Japan as Hyper Olympic '84, is a 1984 sports video game developed and published by Konami for arcades in 1984. It is the sequel to 1983's Track & Field and features seven new Olympic events. Like its predecessor, Hyper Sports has two run buttons and one action button per player. The Japanese release of the game sported an official license for the 1984 Summer Olympics, which was not applicable for its western releases.

== Gameplay ==
The gameplay is much the same as Track & Field in that the player competes in an event and tries to score the most points based on performance criteria, and also by beating the computer entrants in that event. Also, the player tries to exceed a qualification time, distance, or score to advance to the next event. In Hyper Sports, if all of the events are passed successfully, the player advances to the next round of the same events which are faster and harder to qualify for.

The events changed to include these new sports:

1. Swimming - swimming speed is controlled by two run buttons, and breathing is controlled by the action button when prompted by swimmer on screen. There is one re-do if a player fouls due to launching before the gun, but only one "run" at the qualifying time.
2. Skeet shooting - selecting left or right shot via the two run buttons while a clay-bird is in the sight. There are three rounds to attempt to pass the qualifying score. If a perfect score is attained then a different pattern follows allowing for a higher score.
3. Long horse - speed to run at horse is computer controlled, player jumps and pushes off horse via the action button, and rotates as many times as possible via run buttons (and tries to land straight up on feet). There are three attempts at the qualifying score.
4. Archery - firing of the arrow controlled by action button; the elevation angle is controlled by depressing the action button and releasing at the proper time. There are three attempts at passing the qualifying score.
5. Triple jump - speed is controlled by the run buttons, jump and angle are controlled by action button. There are three attempts at the qualifying distance, and player fouls if first jump is after the white line.
6. Weight lifting - power used to lift weights is controlled by run buttons, while shift of weight from lifting up to pushing above the head is controlled by action button. There are two attempts at the qualifying weight.
7. Pole vault - speed to run is preset by computer, while release of pole and body movement is controlled by the action button. Players continue attempting the increasing heights until they foul out (by missing base at the bottom or by knocking off horizontal bar with body at the top). The third foul disqualifies the player. This event was not included in either the ZX Spectrum, Amstrad CPC or Commodore 64 version.

== Reception ==
=== Arcade ===
In Japan, Game Machine listed Hyper Sports on their August 1, 1984 issue as being the sixth most-successful table arcade unit of the month. The following month, it was one of the top five table arcade cabinets on the Game Machine charts. In North America, it appeared in the Play Meter arcade charts for several months through November 1984, when it was one of the top four dedicated arcade cabinets at amusement arcade locations and one of the top three at street locations. However, it was not as successful as its predecessor in North America. In Europe, it became the number-one game arcade game in the United Kingdom.

The arcade game was reviewed by Gene Lewin of Play Meter in late 1984, rating the game 9 out of 10. Roger C. Sharpe of Play Meter called it an "exceptional follow-up" to Track & Field.

=== Ports ===
Reception

Award
Publication	Award
Crash	Crash Smash

Upon release of the home computer conversions, the ZX Spectrum version was the biggest-selling Spectrum game on the monthly UK Gallup charts. The home computer conversions of Hyper Sports went on to top the UK all-formats chart for two months in the summer of 1985, from July to August.

The Commodore 64 version was reviewed by Zzap!64 who said that it was "a first rate conversion" and praised graphics, sound and presentation and received a 90% rating overall. The ZX Spectrum version won the award for best sports simulation of the year from Crash magazine, and was later voted number 59 in the Your Sinclair "Top 100 Games of All Time" list. David M. Wilson and Johnny L. Wilson of Computer Gaming World reviewed the game for the Apple II and Commodore 64 in 1988, stating that "the game is a fast-paced joystick buster which will delight arcade fanatics".

== Legacy ==
Two events from the game, skeet shooting and vault, featured on the BBC television programme First Class.

Hamster Corporation released the game as part of their Arcade Archives series for the Nintendo Switch and PlayStation 4 in November 2019.

In 2018, Konami announced a reimagining of the game, Hyper Sports R, for the Nintendo Switch, but the game was cancelled two years later.
