= International Track & Field 2000 =

1999 video game

- North American Nintendo 64 cover art
- Developers: Konami Computer Entertainment Tokyo (PS1); Konami Computer Entertainment Osaka (GBC, N64, DC, & PS2)
- Publisher: Konami
- Platforms: PlayStation, Nintendo 64, Game Boy Color, Sega Dreamcast, PlayStation 2
- Release: December 10, 1999: PlayStation; NA: December 10, 1999; JP: July 13, 2000; EU: 2000 Nintendo 64; EU: May 28, 2000; JP: July 13, 2000; NA: September 6, 2000 Game Boy Color; NA: December 10, 1999; JP: July 13, 2000; EU: September 8, 2000 Dreamcast; JP: August 31, 2000; EU: September 22, 2000; NA: September 27, 2000 PlayStation 2; JP: August 31, 2000; NA: October 26, 2000; EU: December 8, 2000
- Genre: Sports
- Modes: Single-player, multiplayer

International Track & Field 2000 is a track and field game for PlayStation in 1999 and Nintendo 64 in 2000. It was released in Europe under the names International Track & Field: Summer Games on the Nintendo 64 and Game Boy Color, International Track & Field 2 on the PlayStation and International Track & Field on the PlayStation 2 and in Japan as Ganbare! Nippon! Olympics 2000 (がんばれ！ニッポン！オリンピック2000, Ganbare! Nippon! Orinpikku 2000), where it was licensed by the Japanese Olympic Committee. Versions were also released for the Sega Dreamcast, PlayStation 2, and Game Boy Color as ESPN International Track & Field in North America. (Note: The Dreamcast version is also known as ESPN International Track & Field in Europe.) Maurice Greene, a former men's WR holder in the 100M dash, is the cover athlete.

== Reception ==
Reception

Aggregate scores
Aggregator	Score				
Aggregator	Dreamcast	GBC	N64	PS	PS2
GameRankings	67%	73%	60%	73%	71%
Metacritic	61/100	N/A	N/A	N/A	72/100

Review scores
Publication	Score				
Publication	Dreamcast	GBC	N64	PS	PS2
AllGame	2.5/5	2/5	N/A	1.5/5	N/A
CNET Gamecenter	8/10	N/A	N/A	N/A	7/10
Electronic Gaming Monthly	N/A	N/A	N/A	6/10 (Note: In Electronic Gaming Monthly's review of the PlayStation version, one critic gave it 5.5/10, two others gave it each a score of 6/10, and the other gave it 6.5/10.)	5/10 (Note: Three critics of Electronic Gaming Monthly gave the PlayStation 2 version each a score of 6.5/10, 3.5/10, and 5/10.)
EP Daily	4.5/10	N/A	N/A	N/A	6/10
Eurogamer	N/A	6/10	N/A	N/A	N/A
Famitsu	N/A	25/40	29/40	30/40	N/A
Game Informer	N/A	N/A	7/10	N/A	6.75/10
GameFan	N/A	N/A	83% (Note: In GameFan's viewpoint of the Nintendo 64 version, one critic gave it 86, and the other 80.)	79% (Note: In GameFan's viewpoint of the PlayStation version, one critic gave it 81, and the other 77.)	78%
GameRevolution	D+	N/A	N/A	N/A	C−
GameSpot	7.8/10	N/A	4.7/10	6.9/10	8.1/10
IGN	6/10	8/10	6.1/10	6.5/10	7.5/10
Next Generation	N/A	N/A	N/A	2/5	3/5
Nintendo Power	N/A	7.1/10	7.3/10	N/A	N/A
Official U.S. PlayStation Magazine	N/A	N/A	N/A	4/5	3/5

The PlayStation 2 and Dreamcast versions received "mixed or average reviews" according to the review aggregation website Metacritic. In Japan, Famitsu gave it a score of 30 out of 40 for the PlayStation version, 29 out of 40 for the N64 version, and 25 out of 40 for the Game Boy Color version. The earliest reviews of the game came from GameFan, Game Informer, and Nintendo Power, which gave the N64 version favorable reviews respectively in their April 2000 edition, even though the game itself was not out until months later. Jes Bickham of N64 Magazine gave the same console version 86% months before its European release, saying, "The defiantly 'old-skool' (ahem) gameplay may be the simplest you'll ever experience, but it just goes to show what a winning formula Konami came up with all those years ago -- and they've done their legacy proud."

Four-Eyed Dragon of GamePro said in its January 2000 issue that the PlayStation version "offers new events and sharper graphics. The game's nostalgic gameplay, however, may bore some sports fans, making them feel like amused spectators." (Note: GamePro gave the PlayStation version two 4/5 scores for graphics and fun factor, 3.5/5 for sound, and 5/5 for control.) Eleven issues later, Ash said of the PlayStation 2 version, "You've probably played this game before—or at least one that's extremely similar. Yet you've never seen it look so good—in most events you can make out details of individuals in the crowd. If you're a fan of track & field extravaganzas, or [you] just love multiplayer button-mashing, be sure to put this event into your personal decathlon." (Note: GamePro gave the PlayStation 2 version 5/5 for graphics, 4/5 for sound, and two 4.5/5 scores for control and fun factor.) However, Vicious Sid said that the Dreamcast version "comes on strong with glossy visuals and authentic ESPN highlights. The button-mashing gameplay, however, may leave you as sore as a sprinter with athlete's foot." (Note: GamePro gave the Dreamcast version two 4/5 scores for graphics and control, and two 3.5/5 scores for sound and fun factor.)

Eric Bratcher of NextGen said of the PlayStation version in its March 2000 issue, "If you want Track & Field, this is it. That's a pretty big if, though." Ten months later, in the magazine's January 2001 issue, Kevin Rice said of the PS2 version, "For those who have a serious itch to play an Olympics game this year, this is the best of the crop. But it's still only adequate." Edge gave the PlayStation and PlayStation 2 versions each a score of six out of ten in two separate reviews, first saying that the former console version "isn't a bad game—with four players and a multitap it's [a] very enjoyable and competitive affair—but ultimately, given the playability evident in its predecessor, you can't help but end up expecting a little more than what's on offer" (#80, January 2000); and later saying of the latter console version, "The multiplayer mode masks the sanitised, flat nature of the action, but despite being four years older and lacking 96bits [sic] underneath it, PlayStation IT&F is still significantly more engaging" (#91, December 2000).

The PlayStation 2 version was a runner-up for the "Best Sports Game" award at the Official U.S. PlayStation Magazine 2000 Editors' Awards, which went to Madden NFL 2001.

== See also ==
- ESPN International Winter Sports 2002
