= Athens 2004 (video game) =

2004 video game

- Developer: Eurocom Entertainment Software
- Publishers: Sony Computer Entertainment (PS2); Eidos Interactive (PC)
- Platforms: PlayStation 2, Microsoft Windows
- Release: PlayStation 2: EU: 2 July 2004; NA: 14 July 2004; Microsoft Windows: NA: 5 October 2004; EU: 8 October 2004
- Genre: Sports
- Modes: Single-player, multiplayer

Athens 2004 is a 2004 sports video game developed by Eurocom Entertainment Software. The official video game of the Games of the XXVIII Olympiad, hosted by Athens, Greece in 2004, it was released for the PlayStation 2 by Sony Computer Entertainment and Windows by Eidos Interactive.

== List of events ==
Following is a list of events in the game. By default, all events are available for both sexes unless otherwise noted:

- Track
  - Sprints: 100 metres, 200 metres and 400 metres
  - Middle distance: 800 metres and 1500 metres
  - Hurdles: 100 metres hurdles for women and 110 metres hurdles for men
- Field
  - Jumping: Long jump, triple jump, high jump and pole vault
  - Throwing: Discus throw, javelin throw and shot put
- Swimming
  - 100 metres breaststroke, freestyle, backstroke and butterfly
- Gymnastics (PS2 version only)
  - Artistic: Floor exercise (separate gameplay for male and female), still rings (men only) and vault
- Equestrian (PS2 version only)
  - Show jumping (mixed gender event)
- Weight lifting
  - +105 kg. clean and jerk (male only)
- Archery
  - 70 m individual (female only)
- Shooting
  - Skeet shooting (male only)

== Playable nations ==
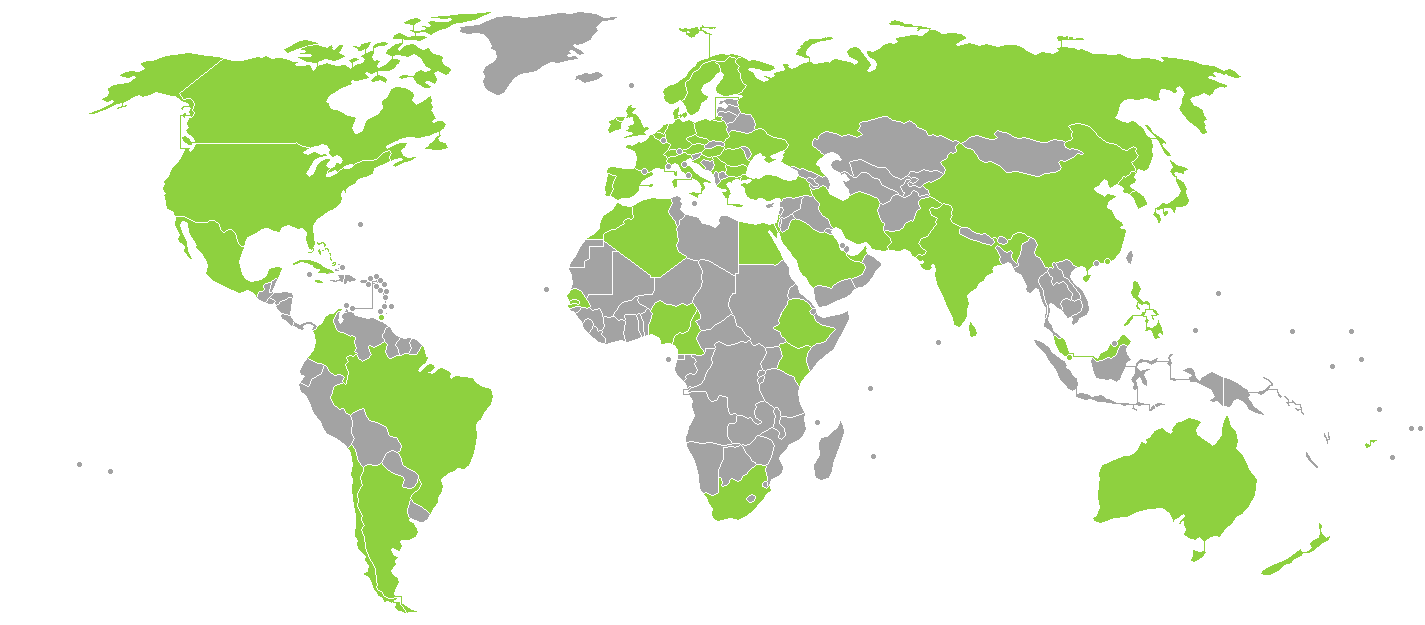
Playable countries

A record 64 countries were able to be played on the game. They are:

- Algeria
- Argentina
- Australia
- Austria
- Bahamas
- Belgium
- Brazil
- Bulgaria
- Cameroon
- Canada
- Chile
- China
- Colombia
- Croatia
- Cuba
- Czech Republic
- Denmark
- Egypt
- Ethiopia
- Fiji
- Finland
- France
- The Gambia
- Germany
- Great Britain
- Greece
- Hungary
- India
- Iran
- Ireland
- Israel
- Italy
- Jamaica
- Japan
- Kenya
- North Korea
- South Korea
- Malaysia
- Mexico
- Morocco
- Netherlands
- New Zealand
- Nigeria
- Norway
- Pakistan
- Philippines
- Poland
- Portugal
- Romania
- Russia
- Saudi Arabia
- Senegal
- Serbia and Montenegro
- Singapore
- South Africa
- Spain
- Sri Lanka
- Sweden
- Switzerland
- Trinidad and Tobago
- Turkey
- Ukraine
- United Arab Emirates
- United States

== Reception ==
Reception

Aggregate score
Aggregator	Score	
Aggregator	PC	PS2
Metacritic	41/100	61/100

Review scores
Publication	Score	
Publication	PC	PS2
Edge	N/A	6/10
Electronic Gaming Monthly	N/A	5.17/10
Eurogamer	N/A	7/10
Famitsu	N/A	26/40
Game Informer	N/A	6/10
GamePro	N/A	3.5/5
GameRevolution	N/A	D
GameSpot	3.6/10	6.5/10
GameSpy	N/A	4/5
GameZone	N/A	9/10
IGN	4.5/10	4.5/10
Official U.S. PlayStation Magazine	N/A	2.5/5
PC Gamer (UK)	9%	N/A
CiN Weekly	N/A	40%
The Times	N/A	3/5

The PlayStation 2 version of Athens 2004 received "mixed" reviews, while the PC version received "unfavorable" reviews, according to the review aggregation website Metacritic. In Japan, where the PS2 version was ported for release on 29 July 2004, Famitsu gave it a score of one seven, two sixes, and one seven for a total of 26 out of 40.

Preceded by Sydney 2000	Official videogame of the Summer Olympic Games	Succeeded by Beijing 2008
