= Winter Games =

1985 video game

- Amiga cover art
- Developers: Epyx; Action Graphics (C64); Free Radical Software (Atari ST, Amiga); Atelier Double (Famicom Disk System/NES)
- Publishers: Epyx (US); U.S. Gold (EU); Pony Canyon (Famicom Disk System); Acclaim (NES)
- Designer: Fumiko Nagata (Famicom Disk System/NES)
- Programmers: Richard A. Ditton (C64, Amiga, Atari ST); Elaine Hodgson (Amiga, Atari ST); Chris Oberth (Apple II); Satoshi Matsubara (Famicom Disk System/NES)
- Artists: Lonnie D. Ropp (C64); Michael Kosaka (C64); Timothy Skelly (Atari ST, Amiga); Takayuki Watanabe (Famicom Disk System/NES)
- Composers: David Thiel; Kenichi Tomizawa (Famicom Disk System/NES)
- Platforms: Commodore 64, Apple II, Amiga, Atari ST, Apple IIGS, Amstrad CPC, MSX, NEC PC-8801 ZX Spectrum, IBM PC, Atari 2600, Atari 7800, NES, Famicom Disk System, Virtual Console, Apple Macintosh
- Release: Commodore 64: NA: October 1985; Apple II: NA: November 1985
- Genre: Sports game
- Mode: Single-player

Winter Games is a 1985 sports video game developed by Epyx and released in Europe by U.S. Gold. A snow-and-ice themed follow-up to the highly successful Summer Games, Winter Games was released in 1985 for the Commodore 64 and later ported to several popular home computers and video game consoles of the 1980s.

Based on sports featured in the Winter Olympic Games, the game was presented as a virtual multi-sport carnival called the "Epyx Winter Games" (there was no official IOC licensing in place) with up to 8 players each choosing a country to represent, and then taking turns competing in various events to try for a medal.

== Events ==
The events available vary slightly depending on the platform, but include some or all of the following:

- Slalom skiing
- Ski jumping
- Biathlon
- Bobsled
- Figure skating
- Speed skating
- Luge
- Freestyle skiing; the aerial skiing discipline, called "Hot Dog Aerials" in the game
- Free skating

The game allows players to compete in all of the events sequentially, choose a few events, choose just one event, or practice an event.

== Ports ==
C64 screenshot of the "Hot Dog Aerials" event

Winter Games was ported to the Amiga, Apple II, Atari ST, Apple Macintosh, Apple IIGS, Amstrad CPC, ZX Spectrum, and IBM PC computer platforms, and to the Atari 2600, Atari 7800, Nintendo Entertainment System, and the Family Computer Disk System video game consoles. In 2004, it was featured as one of the games on the C64 Direct-to-TV. A Virtual Console version was released in Europe in February 2009.

== Reception ==
Reception

Awards
Publication	Award
Crash	Crash Smash
Sinclair User	SU Classic

Winter Games was Epyx's best-selling Commodore game as of late 1987. Its sales had surpassed 250,000 copies by November 1989.

Info rated Winter Games four-plus stars out of five, stating that each event was good enough to be sold separately, and concluding that it was "sports simulation at its best!". In 1985, Zzap!64 gave 94% for the game calling it "another classic sport simulation from Epyx". Lemon64 website users have given average vote of 8.6 which places the game on top 20 list on the site. The game was reviewed in 1988 in Dragon #132 by Hartley, Patricia, and Kirk Lesser in "The Role of Computers" column. The reviewers gave the game 3½ out of 5 stars. The Spectrum version topped the charts for the month of April. However, the NES and Famicom Disk System versions were critically panned for unresponsive controls, abysmal music and poor graphics.

The Angry Video Game Nerd reviewed the NES version of the game in December 2009. In it, he calls the game's controls some of the worst in a game ever.

In 1996, Next Generation listed the "Games" series collectively as number 89 on its "Top 100 Games of All Time". The magazine wrote that though the games had great graphics for their time, their most defining qualities were their competitive multiplayer modes and "level of control that has yet to be equaled".
