= Track & Field (video game) =

1983 video game

- European arcade flyer
- Developer: Konami
- Publishers: Konami: Arcade; JP/EU: Konami; NA: Centuri Ports; JP: Konami; NA: Atarisoft NES; JP/NA: Konami; EU: Kemco ZX Spectrum Ocean Software
- Platform: Arcade: Apple II, Commodore 64, Atari 2600, Atari 8-bit, MSX, Famicom/NES, Amstrad CPC, ZX Spectrum, Sharp X1, Game Boy, Xbox 360
- Release: September 1983: Arcade; JP: September 1983; NA: October 17, 1983; EU: Late 1983 Apple II, C64; July 1984 2600; Late 1984 Atari 8-bit; 1984 MSX; JP: 1984; EU: 1984 Famicom/NES; JP: June 21, 1985; NA: April 1987; EU: 1992 CPC, ZX Spectrum; UK: 1988 Game Boy; JP: July 17, 1992; NA: September 1992; EU: 1992 Xbox 360; WW: August 8, 2007
- Genre: Sports
- Modes: Single-player, multiplayer

Track & Field (also known as Hyper Olympic (Note: Japanese: ハイパーオリンピック, Hepburn: Haipā Orinpikku) in Japan and Europe) is a 1983 sports video game developed and published by Konami for arcades. The Japanese release featured an official license for the 1984 Summer Olympics. In Europe, the game was initially released under the Japanese title Hyper Olympic in 1983, before being re-released under the US title Track & Field in early 1984. Centuri released the game in North America.

Players compete in a series of events, most involving alternately pressing two buttons as quickly as possible to make the onscreen character run faster. The game uses a horizontal side-scrolling format, displaying one or two tracks at a time, a large scoreboard that shows world records and current attempts, and a packed audience in the background.

The game was a worldwide commercial success in arcades, becoming one of the most successful arcade games of 1984. Konami and Centuri also organized a 1984 Track & Field video game competition that attracted more than a million players internationally, holding the record for the largest organized video game competition of all time as of 2016. It was followed by several sequels including Hyper Sports, as well as similar Olympic video games from other companies. The game's popularity led to a resurgence in arcade sports games, and also inspired Namco's side-scrolling platform game Pac-Land (1984).

== Gameplay ==
In the original arcade game, the player uses two "run" buttons (or a trackball in later units that replaced buttons damaged from overuse) and one "action" button to control an athlete competing in the following six events:

- 100 meter dash – running by quickly alternating button presses.
- Long jump – running by alternating button press and correct timing for jump — hold jump button to set angle (42 degrees is optimal).
- Javelin throw – running by alternating button presses and then using action button correct timing for angle (43 degrees is optimal).
- 110 meter hurdles – running by alternating button presses and using action button to time jumps.
- Hammer throw – spinning initiated by pressing a run button once and then correctly timed press of action button to choose angle (45 degrees is optimal).
- High jump – running (speed set by computer) and then action button must be held down to determine angle of jump — once in the air, the run button can be rapidly pressed for additional height.

Long jump event

In each event, there is a qualifying time or level that the player must achieve to advance to the next event. Failing to qualify (in one heat for running events or three attempts in the other events) will reduce the player's number of lives by one. If the player has no lives remaining, the game will end. Players can earn extra lives for every 100,000 points scored.

Start of the 100m dash

The game can accommodate up to four players, who compete in pairs for the running events and individually for the others. If there are fewer than four players, the remaining slots are filled by the computer (or player "CPU"). In all multiplayer heats, however, the relative performances of the players do not affect the game; advancing is based solely on qualifying times. While most multiplayer arcade games have their controls arranged from left to right for the players, this game, which features two sets of controls, has a somewhat different setup. The left set of controls is designated for players 2 and 4, while the right set is for players 1 and 3. This is one of the few classic arcade games where single-player mode is played using the right set of controls rather than the left. If a player completes all six events, they are sent back to the field for another round, with higher qualifying levels; however, the game can be configured to conclude after the final event.

== Release ==
Hyper Olympic was introduced at Tokyo's Amusement Machine Show (AM Show) in September 1983. Despite the anticipation surrounding laserdisc games prior to the event, Hyper Olympic emerged as the most well-received game at the show. According to Cash Box magazine, several attendees noted "cursory similarities" to The Activision Decathlon, which had been introduced a month earlier. Hyper Olympic was licensed to Centuri for North American distribution. However, Atari was selected as the official sponsor for the Olympic video game, preventing Centuri from retaining the title Hyper Olympic. The game was subsequently introduced in North America as Track & Field at the Amusement & Music Operators Association (AMOA) show in October 1983. Despite the initial hype surrounding laserdisc games, many operators and distributors ultimately regarded Track & Field as the biggest hit at the event.

== Ports ==
Konami licensed the North American home video game rights to Atari, Inc.. They initially ported Track & Field to the Atari 2600 console and the Atari 8-bit computers, followed by versions for the Apple II and the Commodore 64 under the Atarisoft label. A port for the Atari 5200, which would have been identical to the Atari 8-bit computer version, was canceled. The 2600 version was among the new games to utilize Atari's "super chip" technology, enabling enhanced graphics and gameplay variety compared to what was previously possible on the 2600.

When Konami ported Track & Field to the Famicom (as Hyper Olympic), they included only four out of six events. They later converted Hyper Sports to the Famicom as well, this time incorporating three of the Hyper Sports events along with one additional event from Track & Field. By the time the NES gained popularity in the United States, Konami retooled the game for American release by including all eight events from both games in one cartridge. Of the original six events from Track & Field, only the hammer throw is missing; in its place, however, are skeet shooting, archery, and triple jump.

The ZX Spectrum and Amstrad CPC versions were released only as part of the Game, Set and Match II compilation in 1988 and are poorly regarded.

The NES version of Track & Field was re-released in Europe in 1992 as Track & Field in Barcelona by Kemco in light of the 1992 Summer Olympics. The opening song for the NES version is the Chariots of Fire theme by Vangelis (which was also used in the arcade version's high score screen).

== Reception ==
In Japan, Game Machine listed Hyper Olympic as the top-grossing new table arcade cabinet of December 1983, and it remained the top-grossing table cabinet in January 1984. The game sold 38,000 arcade hardware units in Japan by the end of 1983. Track & Field was also a hit in North America. Despite requiring physical interaction from players, the game continued to enjoy success in North America throughout the first half of 1984. It topped the US RePlay upright arcade cabinet charts in February and May 1984, and was the top-grossing arcade game of June 1984. It went on to become the third highest-grossing arcade game of 1984 in the United States. In Europe, it was the highest-grossing arcade game of 1984 in the United Kingdom.

The arcade game received positive reviews upon its release. Gene Lewin of Play Meter magazine scored it 8 out of 10, stating that it would be "a definite 10" if released as a more affordable conversion kit. The review praised it as the best dedicated arcade game at the AMOA 1983 show, highlighting the gameplay, "excellent" graphics, "fantastic" sound, and originality, noting that having "different track and field events is an original idea" and "certainly different" than the other sports games based on baseball, football, or basketball. Computer and Video Games referred to it as a "great game for all you armchair sports enthusiasts," although they cautioned it could lead to cramped fingers.

Reviews for the home conversions varied by platform. Computer Entertainer reviewed the Atari 2600 version in 1984, scoring it 7 out of 8 stars. David M. Wilson and Johnny L. Wilson reviewed the home computer conversions for Computer Gaming World, stating that "the game is primarily a joystick buster." However, Stuart Campbell, writing in Your Sinclair in 1992, considered the Spectrum version to be one of the worst games ever released for that machine.

In 1996, Next Generation magazine ranked the Track & Field series collectively as number 78 on their "Top 100 Games of All Time." They noted that while the gameplay may not accurately reflect skill or knowledge of the actual sports, the game's appeal lies in its pure button-pushing endurance, particularly when played with four players. Additionally, in 1995, Flux magazine placed the arcade version at 65th in its own "Top 100 Video Games" list, further solidifying its status as a classic in the gaming community.

== Competition ==
In 1984, Konami and Centuri jointly organized an international Track & Field video game competition that attracted over a million players from Japan and North America. This event was hailed by Play Meter as "the coin-op event of the year," marking an unprecedented scale in the video game industry at that time. As of 2016, it is recognized by Guinness World Records as the largest organized video game competition in history. The competition, officially known as the "1984 March of Dimes International Konami/Centuri Track & Field Challenge," was highlighted in the Twin Galaxies publication, which noted that more than a million contestants participated between April 30 and May 26, aiming to be among three finalists who would travel to Japan to represent the USA. This event served as a fundraiser for the March of Dimes and was held in Aladdin's Castle arcades and National Convenience Stores. Gary West from Oklahoma City emerged as the U.S. Finals winner, while Phil Britt from Riverside, California, claimed victory in the World Championship held in Tokyo on June 10, 1984.

On December 18, 2008, Héctor Rodriguez from California set a new world record score of 95,350 points. This score surpassed the previous record of 95,040 points set by Kelly Kobashigawa from Los Angeles on June 30, 1985, during the 1985 Video Game Masters Tournament in Victoria, British Columbia, Canada.

== Legacy ==
While not the first Olympic track-and-field game (it was preceded by Olympic Decathlon in 1980 and Activision Decathlon in August 1983), Track & Field spawned other similar Olympic video games following its release. For example, Ocean Software developed a licensed adaptation for home computers titled Daley Thompson's Decathlon (1984). Epyx released its own multi-event collection with Summer Games and subsequently Summer Games II. Dinamic published Video Olimpic for the ZX Spectrum in 1984. Bandai's entry was Stadium Events for the NES in 1986.

Track & Field had a significant impact on the broader sports video game genre, leading to a resurgence of sports games in arcades during the 1980s. Following the release of Track & Field, the arcade industry began producing sports games at levels not seen since the days of Pong and its clones nearly a decade earlier. Sports video games became increasingly popular after Track & Field, with several successful arcade titles released in 1984, including Nintendo's boxing game Punch-Out, the Nintendo VS. System titles Vs. Tennis and Vs. Baseball, Taito's American football game 10-Yard Fight and golf game Birdie King II, and Data East's Tag Team Wrestling.

Namco's Yoshihiro Kishimoto cited Track & Field as the biggest influence on the side-scrolling platform game Pac-Land (1984). The game's controls were heavily inspired by Track & Field, which allowed players to become faster by rapidly tapping the button in succession; Kishimoto found the concept intriguing and believed it would help Pac-Land stand out among other games.

=== Sequels ===
Konami continued releasing games in the series:

- Hyper Sports (1984) (Arcade)
- Track & Field 2 / Hyper Olympic 2 (1984) (MSX)
- Konami '88 (1988) (Arcade)
- Track & Field II (1988) (NES)
- Track & Field (1992) (Game Boy)
- International Track & Field (1996) (Arcade, PS, PSN)
- Hyper Olympics in Nagano (1998) (Arcade, N64, PS)
- International Track & Field 2000 (1999) (PS, N64, GBC, DC, PS2)
- Konami Sports Series (2001) (Mobile phones)
- Hyper Sports 2002 Winter (2002) (GC, PS2, Xbox, GBA)
- New International Track & Field (2008) (NDS)
- Hyper Sports Winter (2010) (iOS)
- Hyper Sports Track & Field (2010) (iOS)

=== Re-releases ===
The game appears in Konami Classics Series: Arcade Hits for the Nintendo DS, but with an altered version of the Chariots of Fire theme. The Game Boy version was rereleased in color as part of the European Konami GB Collection Vol.2.

The Xbox Live Arcade version of the game was released on the Xbox 360 on 8 August 2007, with updated graphics and audio, leaderboards, and online play. It sold 297,307 copies as of 2011.

Hamster Corporation released the game as part of the Arcade Archives series for the Nintendo Switch and PlayStation 4 in 2019.
