= The Activision Decathlon =

1983 video game

- Developer: Activision
- Publisher: Activision
- Designer: David Crane
- Platforms: Atari 2600, Atari 8-bit, Atari 5200, ColecoVision, Commodore 64, MSX
- Release: Atari 2600: NA: August 15, 1983; Commodore 64: EU: 1984; Atari 8-bit: EU: 1985
- Genre: Sports
- Modes: Single-player, multiplayer

The Activision Decathlon is a sports video game written by David Crane for the Atari 2600 and published by Activision in 1983. It was ported to the Atari 8-bit computers, Atari 5200, Commodore 64, ColecoVision, and MSX. Up to four players compete in the ten different events of a real-life decathlon, either in sequence or individually.

== Gameplay ==
110 meter hurdles (C64)

The events are:

1. 100-Meter Dash
2. Long Jump
3. Shot Put
4. High Jump
5. 400-Meter Race
6. 110-Meter Hurdles
7. Discus Throw
8. Pole Vault
9. Javelin Throw
10. 1500-Meter Race

=== Activision Decathlon Club patches ===
A player whose score met or exceeded the values below could send photo documentation to receive an Activision Decathlon Club patch in one of the colors of an Olympic medal:

- 8,600 points: Bronze
- 9,000 points: Silver
- 10,000 points: Gold

== Reception ==
Shortly after release, Activision's Decathlon drew comparisons to Konami's popular arcade game Hyper Olympic (Track & Field), which was introduced at the Amusement Machine Show a month later in September 1983. According to Cash Box magazine, several people claimed there were "cursory similarities" between the two games.

The Atari 2600 version of Decathlon was reviewed by Video magazine in its "Arcade Alley" column where it was described as "an absolute triumph of imaginative programming" and as "a masterwork". Computer and Video Games rated the VCS version 92% while giving the ColecoVision version a 93% score.

In 1985, the game appeared at number-two on the Atari 8-bit chart in the United Kingdom.

== Legacy ==
The game was later reissued simply as Decathlon by the UK budget label Firebird. It was included in the 2002 PlayStation 2 compilation Activision Anthology.

== See also ==
- List of Activision games: 1980–1999
- Olympic Decathlon, 1980 computer game with similar concept and controls
