= Olympic Decathlon =

1980 video game

- Developer: Timothy W. Smith
- Publishers: Microsoft Consumer Products; IBM (PC)
- Platforms: TRS-80, Apple II, IBM PC
- Release: 1980: TRS-80; 1981: Apple II; 1982: IBM PC
- Genre: Sports
- Modes: Single-player, multiplayer

Olympic Decathlon is a sports video game written by Timothy W. Smith for the TRS-80 and published in 1980 by Microsoft. In the game, the player competes in ten track and field events. The gold medalist for decathlon in the Montreal 1976 Summer Olympics, Caitlyn Jenner (then known as Bruce Jenner), is a character. It was ported to the Apple II in 1981. The 1982 version for the IBM PC was renamed Microsoft Decathlon.

== Gameplay ==
The ten events in the game are the 100m run, long jump, shot put, high jump, 400m run, 100m hurdles, discus, pole vault, javelin, and 1500m run. The running events involve alternately pressing the 1 and 2 keys. Other events have more-complex controls, with the pole vault using five different keys.

== Reception ==
Decathlon received the Creative Computing Game of the Year Award at the 1980 West Coast Computer Faire. BYTE in 1981 called Decathlon "a great party game" and "a remarkable simulation ... challenging and entertaining", praising the adherence to the real decathlon's rules and the TRS-80 and Apple II versions' graphics. Computer Gaming World stated in 1982 that Decathlon "has all the characteristics that are required of a long-lasting, quality game". It described the game as having "superb graphics and sound", and concluded that "it is an important contribution to the computer gaming hobby".

Former decathlete Douglas Cobb wrote in PC Magazine in 1983 that "this impressive, realistic game brings back vivid memories and provides exciting entertainment through all ten events. The jumping and throwing events are particularly authentic, applying theories used in actual competition. Strategies combining speed, timing, and direction are authentic enough to help an Olympic hopeful train on the basic principles behind the individual events". In 1984 InfoWorld wrote that "no one's topped it yet. If I were Microsoft, I'd market the heck out of [Decathlon] this summer". Steve Ballmer persuaded Bill Gates to deemphasize games like Decathlon to professionalize Microsoft's image, however.

== Legacy ==
Olympic Decathlon was one of first sports-related programs to mix game and simulation elements, with its Olympic track-and-field gameplay preceding Konami's Track & Field (1983) by several years, as well as The Activision Decathlon (1983).
