= Daley Thompson's Decathlon =

1984 video game

- Developers: Ocean Software; Konami (license)
- Publisher: Ocean Software
- Programmers: Paul Owens; Christian Urquhart; Dan Hartley
- Artist: David Thorpe
- Composers: David Dunn; Martin Galway
- Platforms: Amiga, Amstrad CPC, Atari ST, Commodore 64, ZX Spectrum
- Release: EU: 1984
- Genre: Sports (Olympics)
- Modes: Single-player, multiplayer

Daley Thompson's Decathlon is an Olympic-themed sports video game developed and released by Ocean Software in 1984. It was released in the wake of Daley Thompson's popularity following his gold medals in the decathlon at the 1980 and 1984 Olympic Games. The game design was based on Konami's 1983 arcade game Track & Field.

A second game, Daley Thompson's Super-Test, was released the following year. The third title, Daley Thompson's Olympic Challenge, was released in 1988 to coincide with the 1988 Olympic Games.

== Gameplay ==
The player takes part in the ten events of the modern decathlon:

- Day 1: 100 metres, long jump, shot put, high jump, and 400 metres
- Day 2: 110 hurdles, pole vault, discus, javelin, and 1500 metres

The player starts the game with three lives; failure to reach the minimum standard in an event results in the loss of one life. Success in the 1500 metres event results in the game returning to Day 1 to repeat the events with more difficult qualification criteria.

Depending on the computer, running is simulated by hitting two keys (representing the left and right leg) alternately and as quickly as possible or by moving the joystick from side to side as quickly as possible. The game rapidly gained a reputation among players as a "joystick killer" because of the constant vigorous waggling of the joystick required during many of the events.

The Spectrum version was the first game to use Speedlock, a fast loader on the computer.

== Music ==
The soundtrack of the C64 version of the game was composed by David Dunn. The introduction music, by Martin Galway, is based on the 1978 electronic music piece "Rydeen" by Yellow Magic Orchestra (YMO).

== Reception ==
Daley Thompson's Decathlon was the ninth best-selling computer game of 1985 in the United Kingdom.

Sinclair User gave the game a score of 8/10. The game won the award for Best (Overall) Arcade Game in the Crash magazine Readers Awards 1984 and was the Best Arcade-Style Game of the Year at the Golden Joystick Awards. The One magazine in 1991 rated the game two out of five stars for the Amiga and Atari ST.

In 2017, the game was placed on Eurogamer's "10 games that defined the ZX Spectrum" list.
