= Sango Fighter =

Chinese name
- Traditional Chinese: 三國志武將爭霸，武將爭霸2
- Simplified Chinese: 三国志武将争霸，武將爭霸2
Transcriptions
Standard Mandarin
- Hanyu Pinyin: Sānguózhì Wǔjiàng Zhēngbà, Wǔjiàng Zhēngbà 2

Japanese name
- Kanji: 三国武将争覇
- Hiragana: さんごくぶしょうそうは
Transcriptions
- Romanization: sangoku bushō sōha

Korean name
- Hangul: 무장쟁패2
- Hanja: 武將爭覇2
Transcriptions
- Revised Romanization: Mujang Jaengpae 2

The Sango Fighter games are a series of fighting games for MS-DOS made by the Taiwanese Panda Entertainment. Set in the Three Kingdoms period of Chinese history, it is very similar to Street Fighter and Samurai Shodown, but with historical context.

"Sango" is a rough romanization of Three Kingdoms. Using pinyin, it would be romanized as "san guo".

== Sango Fighter ==
Sango Fighter Chinese Historic Fighting Game (PC-98 English title) 三國武將爭霸 (PC-98 Japanese title)
- Developers: Panda Entertainment (PC/AT, Super A'Can); Great Co., Ltd. (PC-98)
- Publishers: (Taiwan) Panda Entertainment (Commercial PC/AT Chinese version); Accend Inc. (Commercial PC/AT English version); Super Fighter Team (DOS freeware); Imagineer (PC-98) (Taiwan) Dunhuang Technology (Super A'can)
- Series: Sango Fighter
- Platforms: MS-DOS, Super A'Can, PC-98
- Release: 1993-? (MS-DOS); 1995-? (PC-98); 1995-? (Super A'can); 2009-06-18 (MS-DOS freeware)
- Genre: Fighting game
- Modes: Single player, multi-player (max 2)

The first Sango Fighter game was originally published by Panda Entertainment and released in 1993 for MS-DOS.

Shareware developer and publisher Apogee Software was intending to license the game for US distribution as Violent Vengeance, but the deal fell through. Instead, the game was distributed in English under its original title by a Taiwanese company named Accend, albeit without official permission from Panda Entertainment.

In 1995, Taiwan's fledgling 16-bit Super A'can game console saw release of a cartridge version of Sango Fighter, completely programmed inhouse by a single employee of Panda Entertainment. Being a rushed port from the PC version, the A'can adaptation suffered from awkward gameplay and quite a few glitches.

Sango Fighter was also released for the Japanese PC-98 computer, in 1995. For this release, a portion of the game's story text was translated into Japanese. It was otherwise identical to the original MS-DOS version, upon which its code was based. This adaptation was produced by Great Co., Ltd., and released by Imagineer.

The game was illegally ported to the Master System console, with the name Sangokushi, and released only in South Korea. This port is one of the larger games in the console library, with 8 megabits of data size.

While Sango Fighter was quite popular in Taiwan, a lawsuit by C&E Inc. (producers of the PC fighting game Super Fighter) stopped Panda Entertainment from distributing the game, let alone adapting it to other machines. Thus the game was never able to reach its full market potential.

On February 24, 2009, the full legal rights to both Sango Fighter and its sequel were acquired by the North American company Super Fighter Team. Following this, on June 18, 2009, both Chinese and English language editions of the game were released as a free download on the Official Sango Fighter Website. An updated version of the game was released, also as freeware, on February 15, 2011. It featured several significant changes and additions. The current Super Fighter Team version supports English, Chinese and Japanese languages, with Japanese based on the PC-9801 release of the game with newly translated text.

On December 24, 2021, Sango Fighter Special Edition was released as a free download for Windows. This version of the game contains elements from both the MS-DOS and Super A'can editions, and features new material such as a remixed and expanded soundtrack, and rebalanced fight system.

There may have also been a planned, but unfinished 3D sequel by Panda Entertainment. However, the former owner of Panda's intellectual properties stated that no records of any such title exist.

=== Reception ===
Sango Fighter drew much attention of PC gamers when it was released, offering the first fighting game with great graphics for that time and became the definitive fighting game for DOS. The game came in six 1.44 MB floppy disks, considered a large size compared with other games of the same genre.

Computer Gaming World in 1994 stated that "Game play in Sango Fighter is very good, on par with the PC version of Street Fighter". It praised the graphics and sound: "the overall quality of this release is equivalent to any commercial offering". The magazine concluded that the $30 shareware registration fee "is a good value, and comes recommended".

== Sango Fighter 2 ==
Sango Fighter 2 Fighter in China 2 (Panda floppy disk version box title)
- Developer: Panda Entertainment
- Publishers: (Taiwan) Panda Entertainment; Super Fighter Team (freeware)
- Director: Huang Wenjie
- Producer: Brandon Cobb
- Designer: Zhang Zhikai
- Programmers: Zheng Chuanjun; Wang Jindun
- Artists: Zhang Zhikai; Guo Qiuyi
- Writer: Wen Yi
- Composer: Yang Chongrong
- Series: Sango Fighter
- Platform: MS-DOS
- Release: 1995; 2013-11-06 (freeware)
- Genre: Fighting game
- Modes: Single-player, multi-player (max 2)

A sequel was released in 1995, Sango Fighter 2, with more characters and more detailed graphics. Sango Fighter 2 also featured a conquest mode in which the player attempted to unify the empire by invading other nations. In addition, the kingdom of Wu was added to the game.

On November 6, 2013, Sango Fighter 2 was released as a free download on the Official Sango Fighter 2 Website. In addition to being translated into English, the updated game also features several new additions and enhancements. The Super Fighter Team version supports English, Chinese and Korean languages.

== Characters ==
The following is a list of the characters from Sango Fighter and Sango Fighter 2.

Character	His warlord	Playable in Sango Fighter story mode?	Playable in Sango Fighter battle and two-player modes?	Playable in Sango Fighter 2?
Guan Yu	Liu Bei	Yes	Yes	Yes
Zhang Fei	Liu Bei	Yes	Yes	Yes
Zhao Yun	Liu Bei	Yes	Yes	Yes
Ma Chao	Liu Bei	Yes	Yes	Yes
Huang Zhong	Liu Bei	Yes	Yes	Yes
Liu Bei	Liu Bei	No as warlord	No show	No, warlord in story mode only
Zhuge Liang	Liu Bei	No as advisor	No show	No, advisor in story mode only
Xiahou Dun	Cao Cao	No as enemy	Yes	Yes
Xiahou Yuan	Cao Cao	No as enemy	Yes	Yes
Xu Huang	Cao Cao	No as enemy	Yes	Yes
Xu Chu	Cao Cao	No as enemy	Yes	Yes
Dian Wei	Cao Cao	No as enemy	Yes	Yes
Lü Bu	Lü Bu	No as enemy	Yes	Yes, also warlord in story mode
Cao Cao	Cao Cao	No as enemy	Yes	No, warlord in story mode only
Sima Yi	Cao Cao	No show	No show	No, advisor in story mode only
Zhang Liao	Cao Cao	No show	No show	Yes
Gan Ning	Sun Quan	No show	No show	Yes
Taishi Ci	Sun Quan	No show	No show	Yes
Huang Gai	Sun Quan	No show	No show	Yes
Sun Ce	Sun Quan	No show	No show	Yes
Sun Quan	Sun Quan	No show	No show	No, warlord in story mode only
Zhou Yu	Sun Quan	No show	No show	No, advisor in story mode only

Cao Cao is not a playable character in Sango Fighter 2, but he retains a role as a character within the story. Liu Bei, Sun Quan, Sima Yi, Zhuge Liang and Zhou Yu also serve as story characters.

Even though Sun Ce served as leader of the kingdom of Wu historically before his death, in Sango Fighter 2, he is made a subordinate of his younger brother.
