= C&E =

Taiwanese video game company

Computer & Entertainment Inc. 全崴資訊股份有限公司
- Company type: Private
- Industry: Video games
- Founded: 1990s
- Fate: Active
- Headquarters: Taipei, Taiwan

The Computer & Entertainment Inc. (C&E Inc.; Chinese: 全崴資訊股份有限公司) is a Taiwanese video game development company based in Taipei. Established in the early 1990s, the company developed "unlicensed" titles for the consoles NES and Sega Mega Drive with the exception of Simulation Zoo, which was published by Soft Bank for PlayStation and Sega Saturn.

In 1992, some of its members had left the company for the foundation of Hummer Team, a NES pirate game development studio (that which was defunct in 2010).

The rights of two of their games, Beggar Prince and Super Fighter, currently belong to Super Fighter Team. Super Fighter Team have since adapted them to new platforms after translating them into English and performing bug fixes and improvements.

Though C&E is still in business, they no longer produce video game software.

== List of C&E games ==
=== Official titles ===
No.	Title	AKA title(s)	Genre	Platform(s)	Release year(s)	Notes
1	Tiles of Fate	1) Zhànguó Sìchuān Shěng; 2) Idol Shisen Mahjong in JP	Mahjong	NES	1990	First C&E game that contains nudity, but only in the Japanese release.
2	Magic Bubble	1) Bubble Bath Babes in U.S. (Erotic version); 2) Mermaids of Atlantis in U.S. (Clean version); 3) Soap Panic in Japan	Puzzle	NES, Sega Mega Drive	1991 (NES); 1993 (SMD)	Second C&E game that contains nudity, except for the Mega Drive version.
3	AV Mahjong Club		Mahjong	NES	1991	Third C&E game that contains nudity.
4	AV Super Real Pachinko	AV Pachinko	Pachinko	NES	1991	Fourth C&E game that contains nudity.
5	Shènghuǒ Lièzhuàn		RPG	NES	1991	
6	Ultimate League Soccer	1) AV Soccer in Japan; 2) Futebol in Brazil	Sports	NES	1991	Fifth C&E game that contains nudity, but only in the Japanese release.
7	Decathlon		Sports	NES	1992	
8	Super Fighter	Kuài Dǎ Zhìzūn	Fighting	MS-DOS	1993	The English version of the game was developed by Super Fighter Team in 2005.
9	Devilish Mahjong Tower	Máquè Èmó Tǎ	Mahjong	Sega Mega Drive	1994	
10	Taiwan Tycoon	Táiwān Dàhēng	Game-of-life and/or Monopoly style board game.	Sega Mega Drive	1994	
11	World Pro Baseball 94	Shìjiè Zhí Bàng Zhēngbà Zhàn	Sports	Sega Mega Drive	1994	
12	A Q Renkan Awa	Ā Q Liánhuán Pào	Edutainment Game-of-Life quiz hybrid	Sega Mega Drive	1995	The game features many BGMs that resembles or modified from Scott Joplin's ragtime compositions.
13	Fēngshénbǎng - Zhǔ Lù Zhī Zhàn		RPG	NES	1995	Based on the Chinese novel of the same name.
14	Super Taiwanese Baseball League	Chāojí Zhōnghuá Zhí Bàng Liánméng	Sports	Super A'Can	1995	Game developed by Quan Wei Technology.
15	Beggar Prince	Xīn Qǐgài Wángzǐ	RPG	Sega Mega Drive, PC	1996 (SMD); 1998 (PC)	The English version of the game was developed by Super Fighter Team in 2006.
16	Simulation Zoo		Zoo simulator	Sega Saturn, PlayStation	1997	Game published by Soft Bank.

=== Unreleased titles ===
- American Crisis (NES)
- Bai-Bai Dino (NES)
- Rolltris (NES)
- Poker (NES)

== See also ==
- List of companies of Taiwan
