= Super A'Can =

Home video game console produced by Funtech

Super A'can

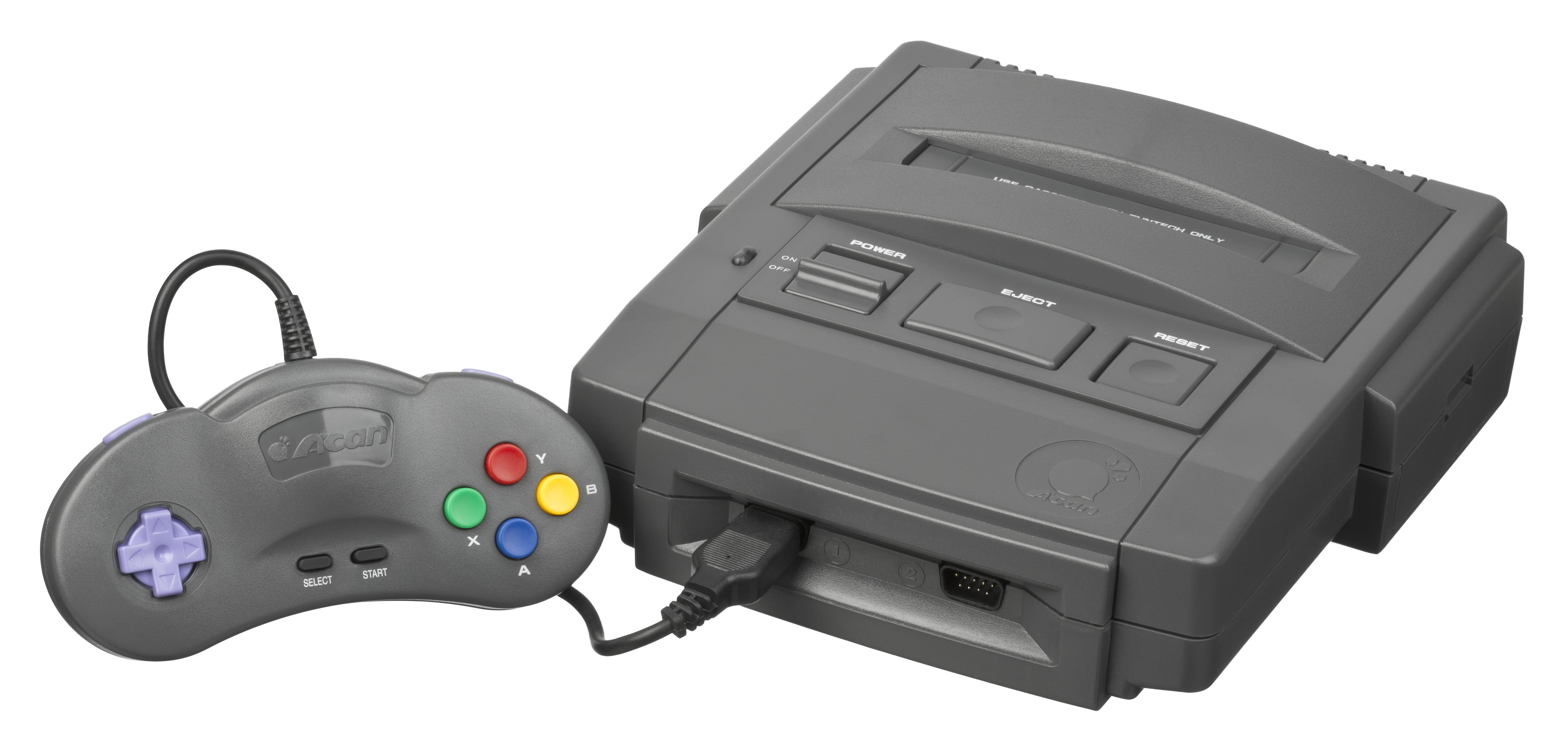
- Codename: F-16
- Manufacturer: Funtech
- Type: Home video game console
- Generation: Fifth generation
- Released: TW/CN: October 25, 1995
- Lifespan: 1995–1996
- Introductory price: NT$2,900
- Discontinued: April 4, 1996
- Media: ROM cartridge
- CPU: Motorola 68000
- Memory: 256 KiB (SRAM)
- Display: TV using RF or composite video, 320×240 resolution, 256 out of 32,768 colors
- Graphics: UMC UM6618, 128 KiB VRAM
- Sound: UMC UM6619 (PCM, 16 channels, stereo)

The Super A'can is a home video game console released in 1995 exclusively in Taiwan by Funtech/Dunhuang Technology and People's Republic of China by Sino Wealth Electronic Ltd. It is based around the Motorola 68000 microchip, which is also used in the Sega Genesis and Neo Geo. Twelve games have been confirmed to exist for the system.

== Commercial performance ==
The Super A'Can failed because its initial costs were too high for customers. It had no chance to compete with fifth generation video game consoles, such as the PlayStation, the Nintendo 64 and the Sega Saturn, all of which had 3D graphics. The Super A'Can performed poorly enough that it lost its company, Funtech, over $6 million USD. In the end, Funtech destroyed all equipment from production and development of the system, and sold off all remaining systems to the United States as scrap parts.

== Technical specifications ==
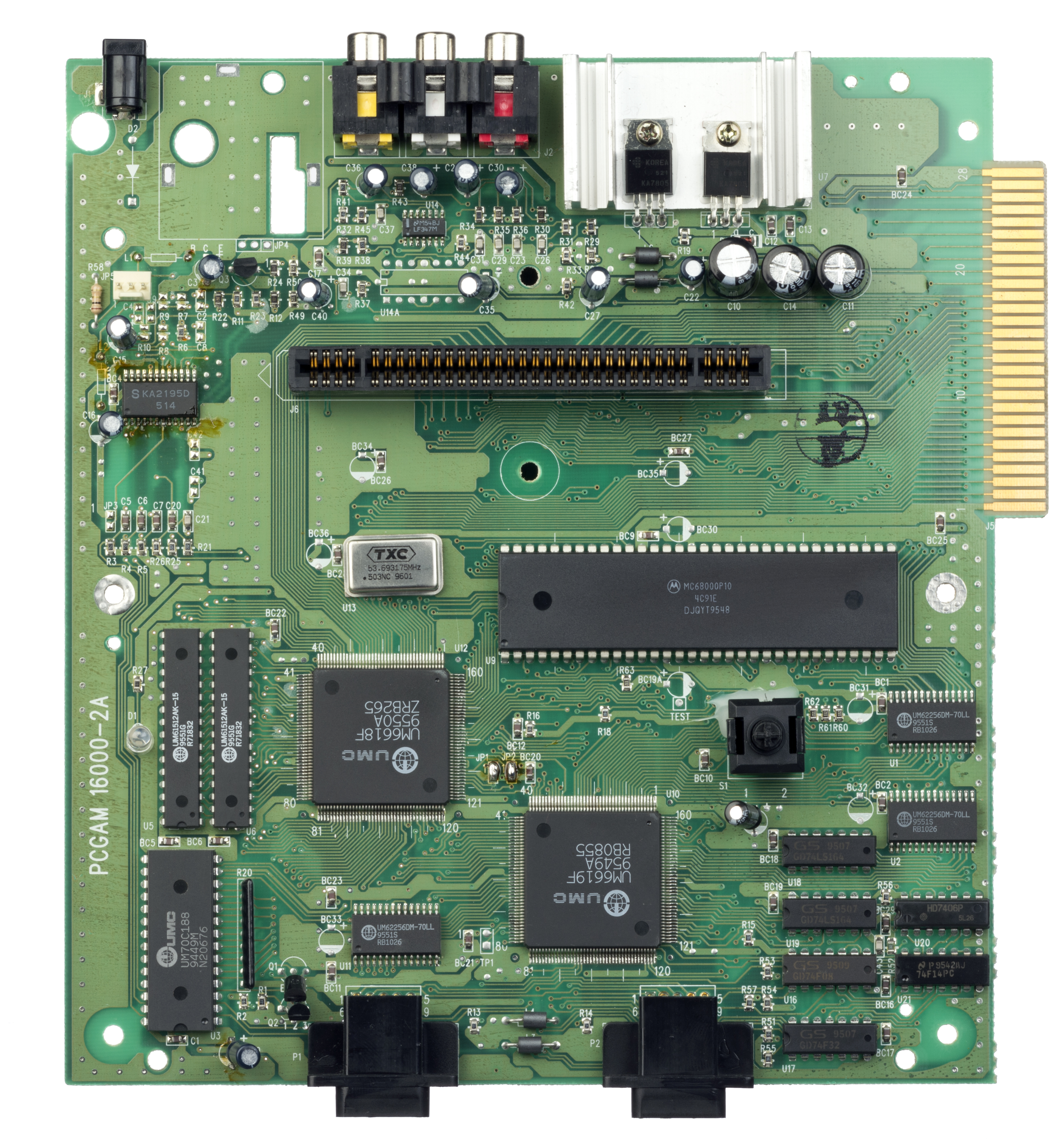
The Super A'can uses a Motorola 68000 as its main processor.

| CPU | Motorola 68000 clocked at 10.738635 MHz |
| Memory | 64 Kb Work RAM, 32 Kb Secondary RAM, 128 Kb VRAM, clocked at CPU speed |
| Graphics | UMC UM6618 displaying 256 out of a possible 32,768 colors at 320×240 resolution. Max sprite size of 256×256px, up to 40 sprites on line, with 16 or 256 colors per sprite. Supports zooming, rotating, and mosaic effects. |
| Audio | UMC UM6619 outputting stereo 16-track PCM |
| Cartridge | Max size of 112 Mib, with built-in SRAM of 16-64 KiB |
| Control pad inputs | Two DE-9M (9-pin male D-connectors) on front of console, identical to those of the Sega Genesis/Mega Drive (though not compatible with Genesis/Mega Drive control pads) Controller IC has identical timing to Super Nintendo/Super Famicom with the exception of the Select and Start are swapped. |
| A/V Output | RF, composite video/RCA audio. Later models removed the RF output to reduce costs. |

== Peripherals ==
A CD-ROM attachment (similar to Sega's Mega-CD add-on), and a CPU/Graphics upgrade (similar to Sega's 32X add-on) were planned but unreleased.

== List of games ==
=== Released ===
| # | Serial number | Title | AKA title(s) | Developer(s) | Genre | Release year |
|---|---|---|---|---|---|---|
| 1 | F008 | African Adventures | 1) Fēizhōu Tànxiǎn; 2) Monopoly: Adventure in Africa | Panda Entertainment | Puzzle | 1995 |
| 2 | F006 | C.U.G. | 1) Xī Yóujì; 2) Journey to the Laugh | Funtech | Platform | 1995 |
| 3 | F001 | Formosa Duel | Fú Ěr Mó Shā Dà Duìjué | AV Artisan | Puzzle | 1995 |
| 4 | F002 | Sango Fighter | Sānguózhì Wǔjiàng Zhēngbà | Panda Entertainment | Fighting | 1995 |
| 5 | F003 | The Son of Evil | Xié'è Zhīzǐ | Funtech | RPG | 1995 |
| 6 | F004 | Speedy Dragon | 1) Yīnsù Fēilóng; 2) Sonic Dragon | AV Artisan | Platform | 1995 |
| 7 | F005 | Super Taiwanese Baseball League | Chāojí Zhōnghuá Zhí Bàng Liánméng | Quan Wei Technology/C&E | Sports | 1995 |
| 8 | F011 | Boom Zoo | 1) Bào Bào Dòngwùyuán; 2) Explosive Burst Zoo | Funtech | Action | 1996 |
| 9 | F009 | Gambling Lord | Dǔ Bà | Panda Entertainment/Funtech | Mahjong | 1996 |
| 10 | F012 | REBEL | 1) Pàn Xīng; 2) Rebel Star | Horng Shen Information Co., Ltd | RPG | 1996 |
| 11 | F007 | Super Dragon Force | 1) Chāojí Guāngmíng Zhàn Shǐ; 2) Super Light Saga: Dragon Force | Kingformation Co., Ltd. | RPG | 1996 |
| 12 | F010 | Magical Pool | Mó Bàng Zhuàngqiú | Funtech | Sports | 1996 |

=== Unreleased ===
| # | Title | AKA title(s) | Developer(s) | Genre | Notes |
|---|---|---|---|---|---|
| 1 | Journey to the Center of the Earth | 地心歷險 | Tai Ruan Technology | Action RPG | ---- |
| 2 | Cat Ball Defense Team | 貓球防衛隊 | AV Artisan | Shoot 'em up | ---- |
| 3 | Birdcage Yard | 鳥籠院 | Funtech | Action | ---- |
| 4 | Lightning Mobile Unit | 雷霆機動隊 | Fun Yours Entertainment | Shoot 'em up | ---- |
| 5 | Dinosaur War | 恐龍戰記 | Funtech | Simulation | ---- |
| 6 | A Q Lian Huan Pao | 阿Q連環炮 | C&E | ETC - Trivia/Game Show? | Later released on Sega Genesis |
| 7 | Romance of Bōsōzoku | 暴走族之戀 | Funtech | Single-player game | ---- |
| 8 | Woman Guerrillero | 王八妹 | AV Artisan | Shoot 'em up | ---- |
| 9 | Hero Saga | 英 雄戰記 | Dynasty International Information Co. | RPG | ---- |
| 10 | Happy Zoo | 快樂動物園 | Stone General Computer | ETC | ---- |
| 11 | Demon Island | 惡魔島 | Jackbean Information Co. | Action | ---- |
