= Blue Almanac =

1991 video game

- Cover art
- Developer: Hot-B
- Publisher: Kodansha
- Composers: Noriyuki Iwadare (岩垂徳行); Masaru Suzuki
- Platforms: Mega Drive; PC
- Release: Mega Drive: JP: June 22, 1991; NA: June 22, 2011; Windows/Mac Os X: WW: August 6, 2013
- Genre: Role-playing
- Mode: Single player

Blue Almanac (ブルーアルマナック, Burū Arumanakku) is a futuristic role-playing video game for the Sega Mega Drive.

It was released only for Japan on June 22, 1991 and had a US release as Star Odyssey planned and advertised but it was cancelled at the time. North American publisher Super Fighter Team acquired the official rights to publish an English version of the game with alterations to the translation and the programming, based on an as-yet-unreleased prototype of the US version, and released it exactly twenty years after the game's original release as Star Odyssey.

A futuristic city as seen in the game.

== Super Fighter Team ==
This game was officially released worldwide, in English, on June 22, 2011 under the name Star Odyssey. It was produced and published by North American company Super Fighter Team in cooperation with Starfish-SD Inc.

On August 6, 2013, the game was released for Windows and Mac OS X, in the form of a compilation package of three Super Fighter Team RPGs, the other two being Beggar Prince and Legend of Wukong.

== Reception ==
Weekly Famitsu gave the game a score of 23 out of 40. Famitsu №132, 1990
