= Legend of Wukong =

1996 video game

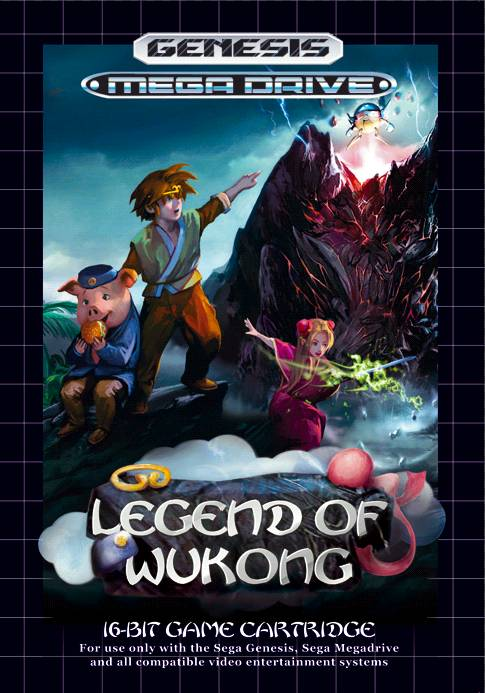
- Developer: Gamtec
- Publishers: TWN: Ming Technology Co., Ltd; WW: Super Fighter Team
- Platforms: Sega Mega Drive/Genesis, Windows, macOS
- Release: TWN: 1996; WW: 2008; WW: 2013
- Genre: Role-playing video game
- Mode: Single-player

Legend of Wukong, originally known as Wucom Legend (Chinese: 悟空外傳; pinyin: Wùkōng Wàizhuàn; lit. 'Wukong Rumors' – 外傳 wàizhuàn is analogous to the Japanese Gaiden), is a Taiwanese role-playing adventure game for the Sega Mega Drive/Genesis developed by Gamtec. It was originally released in 1996 in Chinese only. The game's story is loosely based on the novel Journey to the West.

An English translation of the game was done by the North American company Super Fighter Team, and began shipping to pre-order customers on December 3, 2008, at the price of US$40 per copy. Legend of Wukong was the second game for the Sega Genesis to be commercially released in the United States since 1998.

The game is 16-megabits (2 megabytes) in size. Players could record their progress to any of the three available save slots. The game shipped in a plastic clamshell case along with a glossy, full-color 16 page instruction manual. The game's unique cartridge hardware was designed by Kim Biu Wong, head of Tototek, and Super Fighter Team president Brandon Cobb. All pieces were manufactured in China.

Legend of Wukong works with any Sega Genesis, Mega Drive or Nomad system, regardless of its region (NTSC and PAL are both supported, hence why it says both Genesis & Mega Drive on its box art). This universal compatibility was one of the many new features added to the game by Super Fighter Team in preparation for its release worldwide.

On August 6, 2013, the game was released for Windows and Mac OS X, in the form of a compilation package of three Super Fighter Team RPGs, the other two being Beggar Prince and Star Odyssey.
