= Super Fighter Team =

Video game publisher

- Industry: Video games
- Founded: 2004
- Founder: Brandon Cobb
- Headquarters: San Diego
- Website: www.superfighter.com

Super Fighter Team is a video game production and publishing company whose primary focus is on producing and publishing new video games for unsupported systems such as the Genesis as well as for Windows. The company was founded in 2004 by salesman and entrepreneur Brandon Cobb and is based in San Diego, California.

The company's name is derived from a Taiwanese fighting game, Super Fighter by C&E, which was the first title acquired by the company. The company has since acquired the rights to produce and publish various other titles that were well-known in other regions, but relatively unknown to the Western world.

== Games published ==
| Game | Year | System |
|---|---|---|
| Beggar Prince | 2006 | Genesis |
| Cascade | 2015 | Genesis |
| Commander Keen in Keen Dreams | 2013 | Android |
| Legend of Wukong | 2008 | Genesis |
| Magic Girl | 2015 | Genesis |
| Nightmare Busters | 2013 | Super NES |
| RPG Trifecta Pack | 2013 | Windows, OS X |
| Sango Fighter | 2009 | Windows, MS-DOS |
| Sango Fighter Special Edition | 2021 | Windows |
| Sango Fighter 2 | 2013 | Windows, MS-DOS |
| Star Odyssey | 2011 | Genesis |
| Super Fighter | 2005 | Windows, MS-DOS |
| Super Fighter Special Edition | 2013 | Windows |
| Super Fighter Block Battle | 2008 | S60 Platform |
| Tough Guy: Fighting Titans | 2019 | Windows |
| Zaku | 2009 | Lynx |
