= Zaku (video game) =

2009 shooter game

- Developer: PenguiNet
- Publisher: Super Fighter Team
- Producer: Brandon Cobb
- Designers: Andrew Chan; Deven Gallo; George Astafurov
- Programmer: Osman Celimli
- Artists: Amilcar Parra; Evan Doody; Nick Moy
- Composer: Evren Celimli
- Platform: Atari Lynx
- Release: WW: 24 October 2009
- Genre: Scrolling shooter
- Mode: Single-player

Zaku is a homebrew scrolling shooter video game developed by PenguiNet and published by Super Fighter Team exclusively for the Atari Lynx on 24 October 2009. Taking place on a futuristic setting where Captain Bran and his minions plan to oversaturate the worldwide market with poor quality software using the "Rarity 9" programming tool, players assume the role of the titular character in an effort to retrieve the stolen tool from Bran.

Zaku was conceived by Osman Celimli at a young age during his time working at PenguiNet, who wanted to create a project for a handheld game console, initially focusing on the Game Boy before shifting towards the Atari Lynx and was influenced by Air Zonk, lasting over a course of six years under development prior to release. The game was met with positive reception from reviewers since its initial release, with praise towards the presentation, audio, plot and gameplay, but criticism pointed to its length and some of its design aspects. As of 2018, the title has sold over 1,000 copies in total.

== Gameplay ==
Gameplay screenshot

Zaku is a futuristic science fiction-themed scrolling shoot 'em up game reminiscent of Air Zonk, where players take control of the titular character through sixteen stages across five worlds, each with a boss that must be fought to retrieve the "Rarity 9" programming tool from Captain Bran. At the title screen, players have access to the options menu where various settings can be changed such as the difficulty. Players are free to proceed with the game's worlds in any order. Zaku can charge her shots to fire a more powerful attack and charging longer causes to activate a force field capable of damaging enemies. Zaku is also equipped with rear thrusters to attack enemies from behind. There are no power-ups to acquire besides capsule-shaped items. Zaku can sustain a number of hits before her health depletes and the game is over but players can choose to continue playing after dying.

== Development and release ==
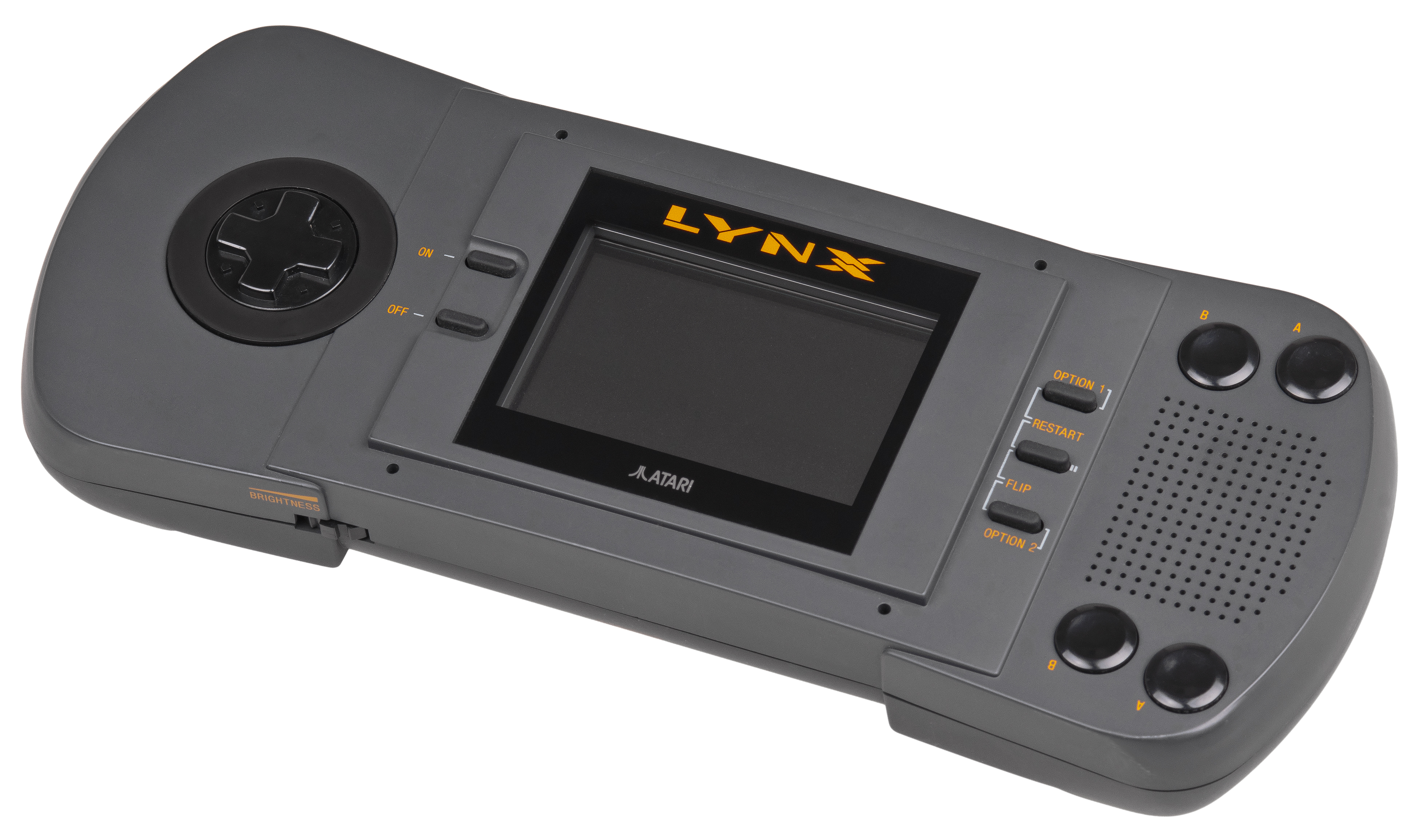
Zaku was in development for the Atari Lynx over the course of six years.

Zaku was the creation of programmer Osman Celimli, who started development of the project in 2003 at the age of 14 working at PenguiNet. Both Celimli and PenguiNet wanted to make a game for a handheld game console, initially targeting the Game Boy for development but focus was shifted towards the Atari Lynx instead due to the former platform's lack of documentation and programming tools, while the Lynx had an already established homebrew community. Super Fighter Team founder Brandon Cobb wanted to work on a project for the Lynx that showcased the system's technical capabilities and after being impressed with an early build of the project, contacted PenguiNet for a production and publishing arrangement.

Zaku was created over a six-year period using an official Lynx development kit, consisting of an Amiga 2000, as well as Microsoft's Paint and Notepad programs for pixel art and coding respectively, among other tools. Celimli stated that the team at PenguiNet finalized the gameplay mechanics and general plot before completing the first and last stages. Environments and enemies were first designed as hand-drawn sketches before being transposed to pixel graphics. Celimli also stated that Air Zonk played an important role during development due to being a favorite of him and wanting the project to resemble it.

Zaku was first showcased to the public as a playable demo at the 2007 Retro-Gaming Connexion convention in Congis-sur-Thérouanne, France. The finished game was published on 24 October 2009 by Super Fighter Team. The title was the first new release for the Atari Lynx whose game cartridge has an authentic "curved lip" plastic shell, reminiscent of officially licensed Lynx titles. It shipped with a packaging mimicking those of licensed Lynx releases. A second print run was launched in May 2012, while a third print run occurred in August 2016.

== Reception ==
Reception

Review scores
| Publication | Score |
|---|---|
| Hardcore Gamer | 4/5 |
| neXGam | 8.0 / 10 |
| The Next Level | 4/5 |
| Pockett Videogames | 5/5 |
| Retro Gamer | 75% |
| ReVival | 9 / 10 |
| Video Game Trader | 4/5 |

Zaku received positive reception from reviewers since its initial release. Heiko Poppen of German website neXGam noted the game's comical plot, controls, graphics and music as positive points but criticized various design aspects. Travis Fahs of gaming website The Next Level praised the presentation and gameplay but criticized the repetitive boss patterns. Olivier Blaszczyk of Pockett Videogames praised the presentation, visuals, audio and gameplay but noted the short length to be the title's only negative point. ReVival magazine's Kiwi and Cyril Denis gave it a 9 out of 10 score. Retro Gamer score Zaku with an overall 75% score.

Zaku has sold over 1,000 copies as of 2018, according to Super Fighter Team's Brandon Cobb.
