= Beggar Prince =

1996 video game

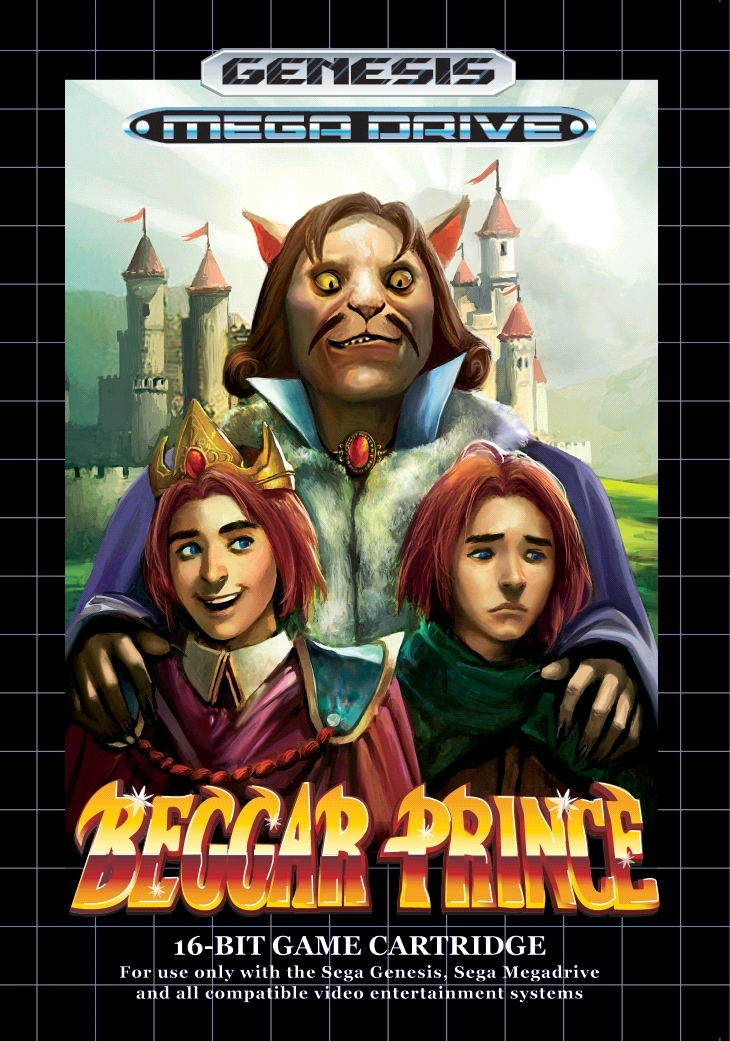
- Cover art of Beggar Prince
- Developer: C&E Inc.
- Publishers: C&E Inc. Super Fighter Team
- Platforms: Mega Drive/Genesis; PC
- Release: 1996 (first release); 1998 (second release); 2006 (third release); 2013 (Windows and Mac OS X)
- Genre: Role-playing video game
- Mode: Single-player

Beggar Prince, originally known as Xin Qigai Wangzi (Chinese: 新乞丐王子; pinyin: Xīn Qǐgài Wángzǐ; Wade–Giles: Hsin Ch'i-kai Wang-tzu; lit. 'The New The Prince and the Pauper') is a Taiwanese role-playing adventure game for the Sega Mega Drive/Genesis and PC. It was originally released in 1996 for the Sega Mega Drive/Genesis by C&E Inc. and later ported and released in 1998 on the PC.

An English translation of the Sega Genesis version was produced by the North American company Super Fighter Team. A prototype version was first shown to the public on August 20, 2005, at the Classic Gaming Expo in Burlingame, California. The completed game began shipping to pre-order customers on May 22, 2006, at the price of US$40 per copy. Beggar Prince was the first game for the Sega Genesis to be commercially released in North America since 1998.

== Technical information ==
For a Sega Mega Drive/Genesis game, Beggar Prince is rather large, weighing in at 32-megabits (4 megabytes) in size. Players could record their progress to any of the four available save slots. The game shipped within a plastic clamshell case along with a glossy, full-color 27-page instruction manual. The game's unique cartridge hardware was designed by Kim Biu Wong, head of Tototek, and Super Fighter Team president Brandon Cobb. All pieces were manufactured in China.

Beggar Prince works with any Sega Genesis (with the exception of Sega Genesis Firecore), Mega Drive or Nomad system, regardless of its region (NTSC and PAL are both supported). But for the first two runs, due to the manner in which the game's save function is programmed, it is impossible to save on systems connected to the 32X or hybrid CD systems such as the Multi-Mega/CDX and Wondermega. Playing the game with a Sega Mega-CD/Sega CD attached to the Mega Drive/Genesis works with the second CD model. On a European Multi-Mega, the game resets itself after the introduction scenes, making it unplayable.

The third production run is notable as the box and manual art were changed and, more importantly, the game's save feature had been re-programmed to allow full functionality with all Genesis, Mega Drive and compatible systems (such as the Nomad, 32X, CDX, X'Eye, Laseractive and so on).

== Release ==
Beggar Prince began shipping to pre-order customers on May 22, 2006. By September 8, 2006, all 600 copies had been sold. However, on October 18, 2006, Super Fighter Team announced that they had begun taking pre-orders for a second production run of 300 copies. On June 19, 2007, this production run had also sold through.

The third production run, introducing several changes, became available for pre-ordering on October 9, 2007, and started shipping on November 27, 2007. In total, the game sold 1,500 copies.

On August 6, 2013, the game was released for Windows and Mac OS X, in the form of a compilation package of three Super Fighter Team RPGs, the other two being Legend of Wukong and Star Odyssey.

== Reception ==
Beggar Prince was covered and reviewed in gaming magazines including Tips & Tricks, Hardcore Gamer, Play, Retro Gamer, Edge, GamesTM, Super Play, and Master Player. It was sold to people in over 25 countries.

After release, players reported finding glitches. Several could result in the main character getting stuck in a certain place where he was not supposed to be, requiring loading a previously saved game. The majority of the glitches present in the original Chinese release have been fixed.
