= Funtech =

Taiwanese electronics company

Funtech Entertainment Corporation
- Company type: Conglomerate
- Industry: Consumer electronics
- Founded: 10 September 1983; Taiwan
- Defunct: 5 November 1998; Taiwan
- Fate: Super A'Can and bankrupt
- Headquarters: Taiwan, Taiwan
- Products: Geographic information system Super A'Can
- Parent: UMC

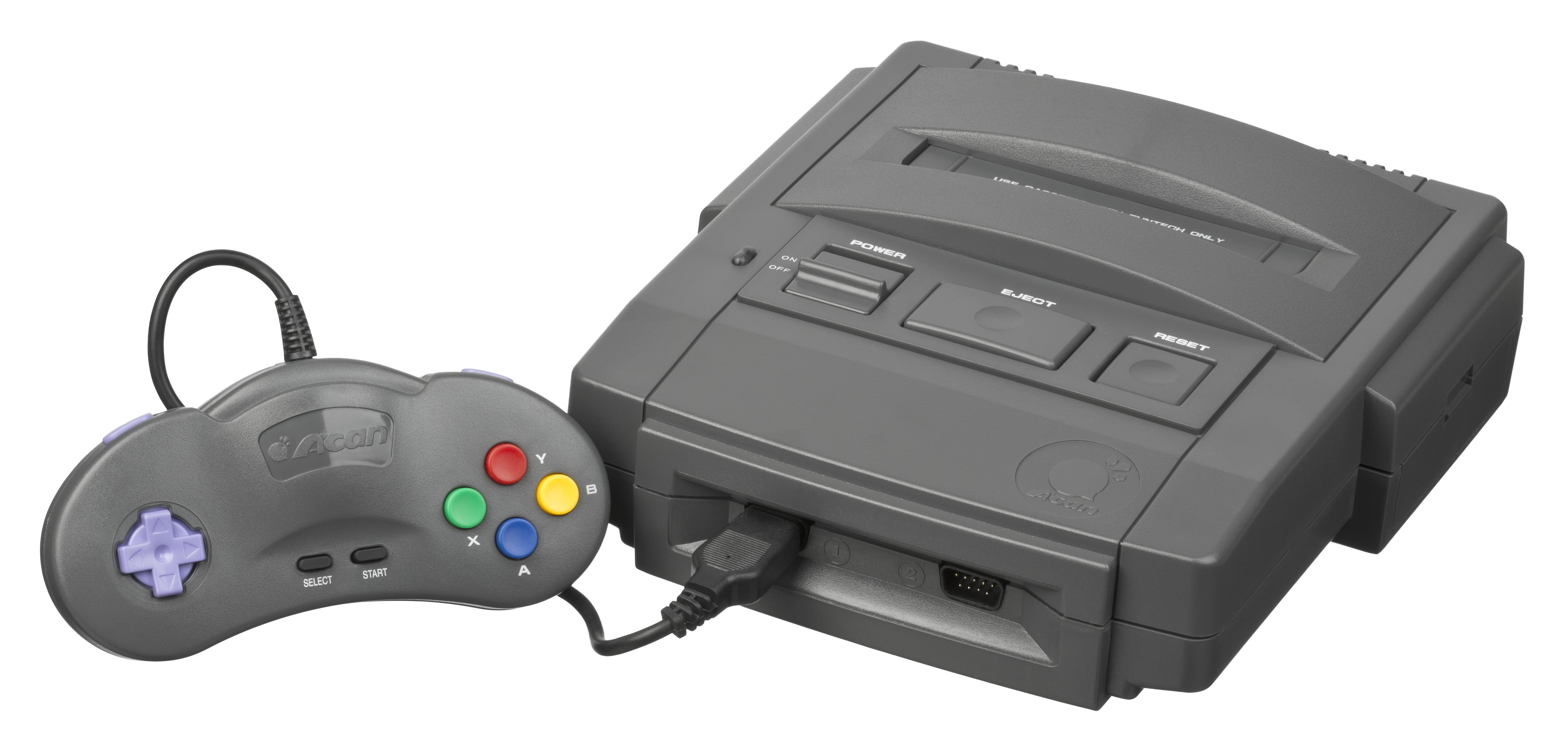
The Super A'Can, released by Funtech in 1995.

The Funtech Entertainment Corporation (敦煌科技 - Dunhuang Technology) was a Taiwanese company responsible for the Super A'Can amongst other things such as Geographic Information Systems, office equipment and office supplies. It was a subsidiary of UMC until it collapsed due to the failure of the Super A'Can.
