= Super Fighter =

1993 video game

- Developers: C&E, Super Fighter Team
- Publishers: C&E, Super Fighter Team
- Platforms: MS-DOS, Windows
- Release: 1993, 2013
- Genre: Fighting

Super Fighter (in Chinese: 快打至尊) is a fighting game for MS-DOS. It was developed by C&E, Inc. of Taiwan, and first released in Taiwan on February 20, 1993. An English version of the game was also released, albeit in much shorter supply, under the name Fatal Encounter.

== Plot ==
The game's plot centers on a drug broker and his murderous minions who claim ownership of the world's combined freedom. Showing their true menace by murdering top ranking government officials, they send a shockwave of fear across the United Nations. Eight heroes, trained to readiness, accept the challenge of going face to face with the top three of this evil circle. The outcome of this battle will truly decide where man's freedoms lie.

During the course of the game, players will select a character and fight through eleven antagonists in hopes of reaching the goal of peace. Each of the heroes are given a set of attacks, stemming from their chosen martial art. In addition, they have all learned powerful special attacks, such as combination punches and kicks, projectiles and enhanced throws.

== Characters ==
Many of the characters were inspired by characters from the Street Fighter game series.

- (Japan) Jaan: This character is based on Ryu, from his clothes to his techniques. Jaan is a triple world champion in karate, has already reached a very high level of fighting skill. However, since he still believes that there are stronger fighters in the world, he never quits practicing. Influenced by his father (who was a soldier in the military), Jaan lives a simple and subtle life. His home is free of dust. Of course, he cares about his personal appearance; his hairstyle is a good example.
- (Russia) Sarkov: Based on Zangief, Sarkov was born into a poor family. He lost his parents when he was very young, making his only relative his elder brother. He was truly a child detached from the outside world. As a child, Sarkov was thin and weak, and was often humiliated. That is, until his brother was slain by ruffians while protecting him! Sarkov swore before his brother's tombstone that he would someday become the strongest man in the world. From that day forward, he trained his body hard by practicing wrestling skills every day. Through this extensive training, he has built up the physical power we can now see.
- (United States) Bullet: Based on Vega. He grew up in the dark streets of the Brooklyn district of New York, where he became an assistant in a boxing gym. There he learned many of the pro boxers' techniques. He became a mysterious fellow who trusted no one. No one, that is, until he met Vanessa. She was a simple and lovely girl, who lightened him up from the brutal and violent world. They were happy together until one day, when she fainted. The hospital revealed that she had a strange illness which would require a large sum of money to cure. Bullet entered the Super Fighter tournament because the only way to bring back the cheerful Vanessa would be to defeat the evil kingpin and win the bounty. Though Bullet is extremely fast, his strength is comparably weak. His speed advantage usually works well enough to help him defeat his enemies, however.
- (China) Lan: Based on Guile and Ryu for his techniques, Lan is one of the most important characters in the game's storyline. Since Lan's family was well known for their achievements in the old Chinese martial arts, he received plenty of training from his father when he was young. As a result, he has learned a large variety of different fighting skills, both with and without the use of weapons. Lan is free and handsome, even when performing his special attacks. Though he is an expert in the Chinese martial arts, Lan continues to train himself fiercely in order to further improve upon his skill.
- Phoenix: Loosely based on Chun-Li and M. Bison, Phoenix is the youngest fighter in the Super Fighter tournament. Once a champion in the Chinese martial arts contest, she and Lan were rivals. They had challenged each other several times, but the result was always a draw. Phoenix and Lan are good friends, but they are not lovers - for she thinks that Lan is still too young, and not mature enough. Like every twenty-year-old girl, her mind was filled with illusions. That is until she met Frank, whom she considers to be a real man. The reason Phoenix entered the Super Fighter contest was probably because she could not find any other opponents in China that were strong enough.
- (United States) Frank: This slightly older version of Ken is one of the most popular characters of the game. With moves of Ken and Balrog, he is an American street fighter that has become very popular because of his "Aura Punch" move. Frank has overlooked the abilities of his opponents, making him lose a lot of battles. Despite his losses, Frank fought bravely each time. Therefore, everyone who has fought with him thinks he's a tough guy, and they all appreciate his morale.
- (Japan) Onimaru: This cybernetically-enhanced older man is the perfect combination of Vega and Dhalsim is a descendant of the Iga ninja group, and had his face disfigured in a mission. For twenty years, he has been hunting for an international drug broker whose true identity remains a mystery. The only things known about this wicked man are that he has radical thoughts, and is planning to dominate the world with drugs. This, and that he is a good fighter. Getting rid of this drug broker is the main reason that Onimaru entered the Super Fighter tournament.
- (South Korea) Kim Tai Chi: A Pili puppet show character. Kim "King" Tai Chi led a poor and simple life. When he was young, he had to do all of the work by himself, such as: gathering firewood, collecting herbal medicine and hunting. These chores kept him in good physical condition. Though Kim Tai Chi was poor, he had always been content with his life. He fights using many taiji moves, as his names remains.
- (United Kingdom) Black Widow: The “spider lady” is an extremely fast fighter. Just like a spider, she is able to attack her opponents very quickly. Her moves are all venomous, just like her nickname: “black widow.” If you wish to stay alive, don't be tempted by her beautiful appearance!
- (Egypt) Joker: Born rich, Joker has developed a lazy character; all he does every day is wander around and bully others. He grows more impatient with each passing day, longing to dominate the world. Joker is definitely a big, tough guy, and his dark ambitions are probably the reason that he is a follower of Red Man, the “Avenger.” Only you can stop this evil man, so be prepared!
- (United States) Red Man: The final boss. “Red Man,” whose true identity is a mystery, has brought fear to the United Nations. He yearns to contaminate the whole world, and thinks that having power is the only reason for living; that only evil can conquer everything. Radical thoughts have driven him so far that he calls himself the reincarnation of Satan, and that he must exact his revenge for being exiled to hell. To bring about this revenge, he plans to kill all of God's people. It is rumoured that Red Man was once an apprentice of Lan's father, who abandoned his discipline and killed his master. He truly is a merciless monster.

== Super Fighter Team ==
Since 2001, North American company Super Fighter Team are in charge of continued, new developments and general support for Super Fighter, with full permission of C&E, Inc, who also gave Super Fighter Team their source code for the original game. Their efforts are showcased at the Official Super Fighter Website, which includes a freeware download of the full game (both Chinese and English language editions are offered).

A Flash version of Super Fighter was created by a team in Germany for online play, which was offered for several years. However, it was eventually dropped from the official website due to its simplicity and crudeness. Even so, it can still be found on many Flash game websites around the world.

On December 21, 2008, Super Fighter Block Battle was released as freeware for mobile phones operating under the Symbian S60 software platform. As it features the same characters as the original game, and continues on its storyline, it is the first official follow-up to Super Fighter.

On November 6, 2013, Super Fighter Special Edition was released as a free download for Windows, to commemorate the game's 20th anniversary. Notable features of this edition include a new soundtrack, additional attacks for each fighter, and nearly one hundred new frames of character animation.
