= Sega Genesis =

Home video game console

Sega Genesis / Mega Drive

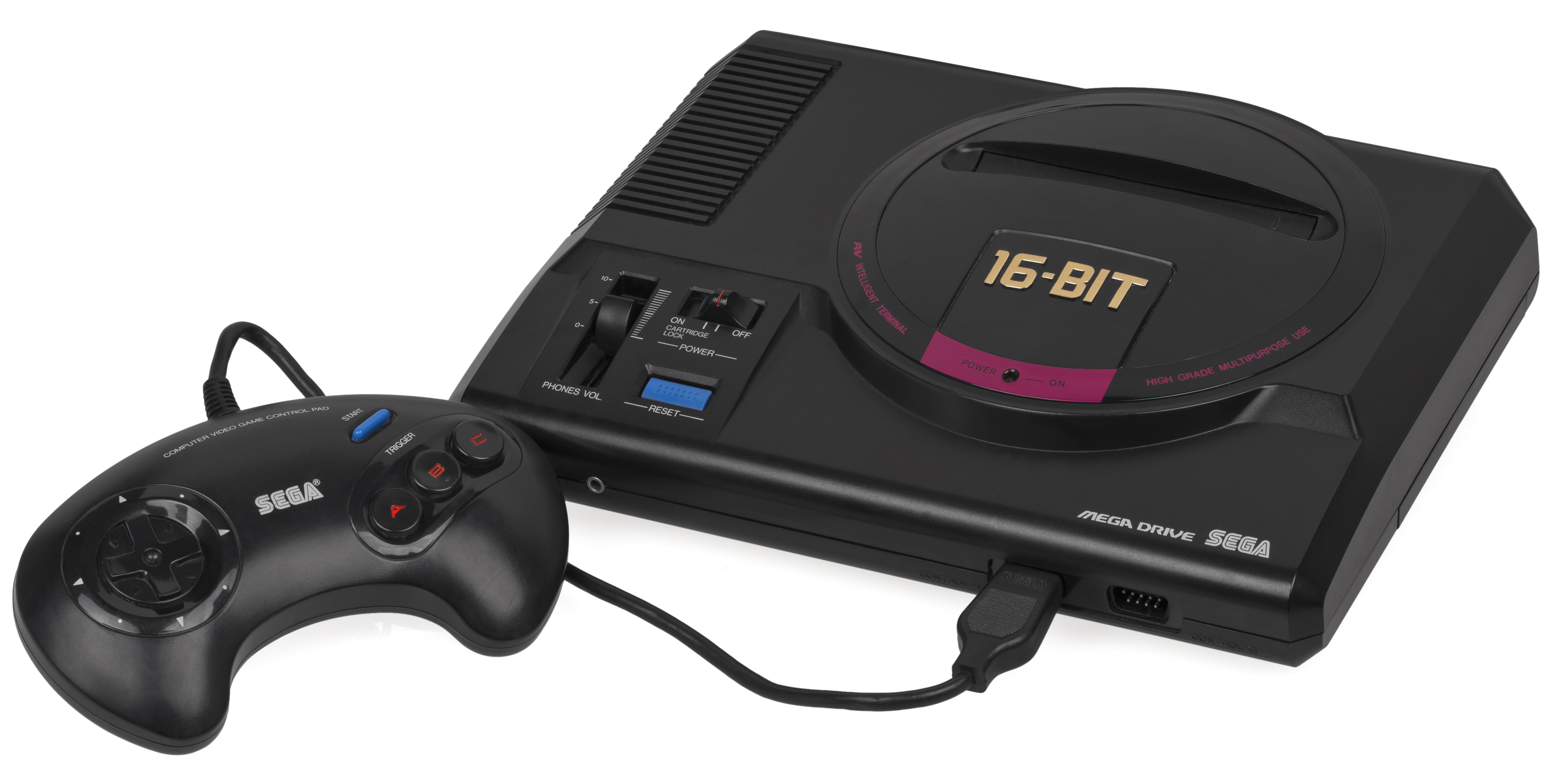
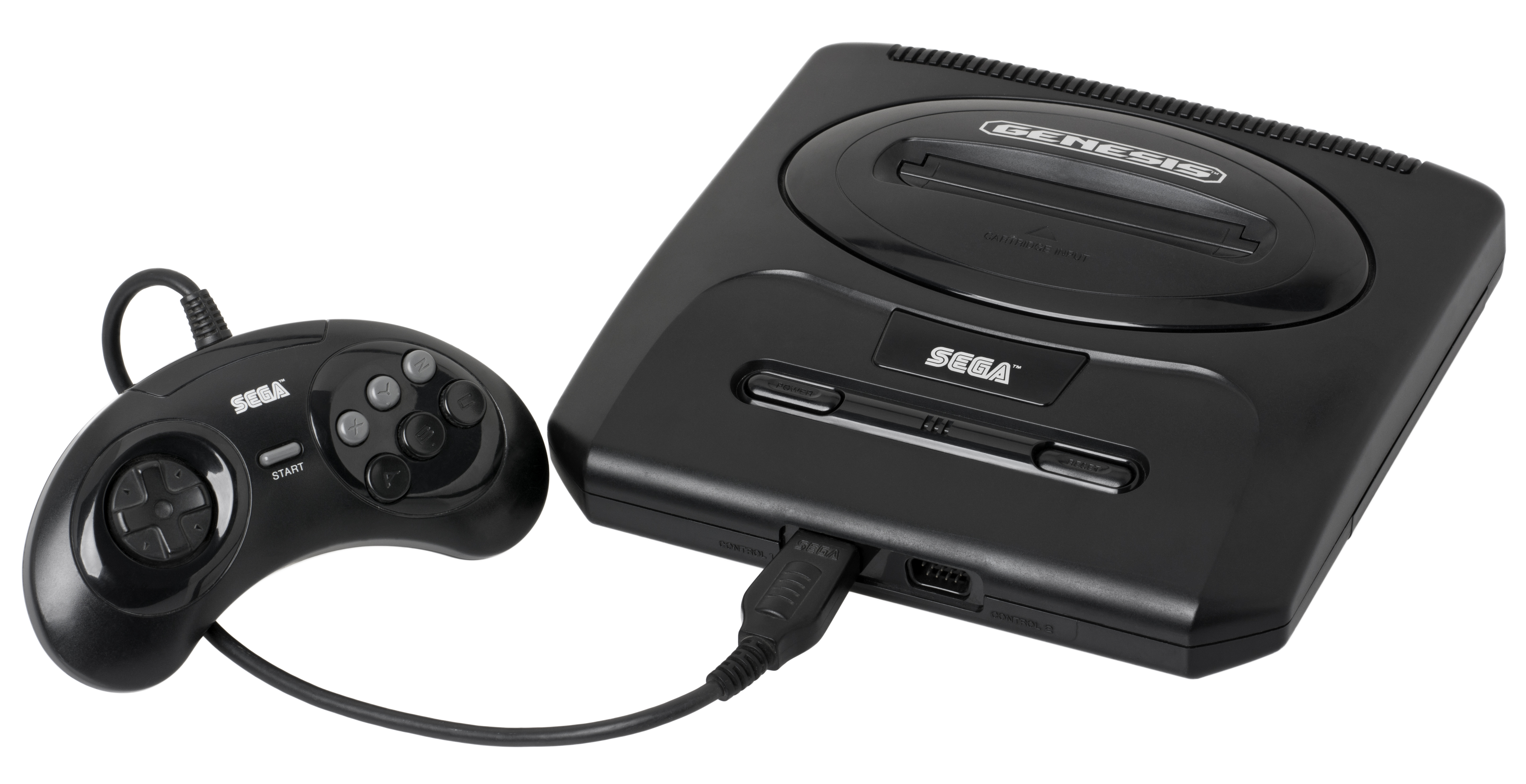
- Top: Original Japanese Mega Drive; Bottom: Genesis Model 2; Other variations are pictured under Variations below.
- Also known as: KOR: Samsung Super Gam*Boy Samsung Super Aladdin Boy Super Aladdin Boy II
- Developer: Sega
- Manufacturer: Sega
- Type: Home video game console
- Generation: Fourth
- Released: JP: October 29, 1988; NA: August 1989 (Note: The official release was September 1989, but a handful of shipments arrived and sold early in late August in New York and Los Angeles.); KOR: August 1990; PAL: September 1990; BRA: September 1, 1990; IND: April 1994
- Lifespan: 1988–1997 (Sega); 1998–1999 (Majesco); 1990–present (Tectoy)
- Introductory price: ¥21,000 (equivalent to ¥26,800 in 2024); US$189 (equivalent to $490 in 2025) £189.99 (equivalent to £470 in 2025)
- Discontinued: WW: 1997 (Sega); NA: 1999 (Majesco)
- Units sold: Sega: 30.75 million; Majesco: 1.5 million (projected); Tectoy: 3 million
- Media: ROM cartridge
- CPU: Motorola 68000 @ 7.6 MHz; Zilog Z80 @ 3.58 MHz
- Memory: 64 KB RAM, 64 KB VRAM, 8 KB audio RAM
- Display: Progressive: 320×224, 256×224 (NTSC) or 320×240, 256×240 (PAL) pixels, 512 color palette, 61 colors on-screen; Interlaced: 320×448, 256×448 (NTSC) or 320×480, 256×480 (PAL)
- Sound: Yamaha YM2612; Texas Instruments SN76489
- Online services: Sega Meganet; Sega Channel; XBAND
- Best-selling game: Sonic the Hedgehog (15 million, pack-in); Sonic the Hedgehog 2 (6 million) (list)
- Backward compatibility: Master System (Note: Through use of the Power Base Converter peripheral)
- Predecessor: Master System
- Successor: Sega Saturn
- Related: Sega CD; 32X; LaserActive

The Sega Genesis, known as the Mega Drive (Note: Japanese: メガドライブ, Hepburn: Mega Doraibu) outside North America, is a 16-bit fourth generation home video game console developed and sold by Sega. It was Sega's third console and the successor to the Master System. Sega released it in October 1988 in Japan as the Mega Drive, and in August 1989 in North America as the Genesis. In 1990, it was distributed as the Mega Drive by Virgin Mastertronic in Europe, Sega Ozisoft in Australasia, and Tectoy in Brazil. In South Korea, it was distributed by Samsung Electronics as the Super Gam*Boy and later the Super Aladdin Boy. (Note: Super Gam*Boy (Korean: 수퍼겜보이; RR: Syupeo Gem Boi), Super Aladdin Boy (Korean: 수퍼알라딘보이; RR: Syupeo Alladin Boi))

Designed by an R&D team supervised by Hideki Sato and Masami Ishikawa, the Genesis was adapted from Sega's System 16 arcade board, centered on a Motorola 68000 processor as the CPU, a Zilog Z80 as a sound controller, and a video system supporting hardware sprites, tiles, and scrolling. It plays a library of more than 800 games on ROM-based cartridges. Several add-ons were released, including a Power Base Converter to play Master System games. It was released in several different versions, some created by third parties. Sega created two network services to support the Genesis: Sega Meganet and Sega Channel.

In Japan, the Mega Drive fared poorly against its two main competitors, Nintendo's Super Famicom and NEC's PC Engine, but it achieved considerable success in North America, Brazil, Australia, and Europe. Contributing to its success were its library of arcade game ports, the popularity of Sega's Sonic the Hedgehog series, several popular sports franchises, and aggressive youth marketing that positioned it as the cool console for adolescents. The 1991 North American release of the Super Nintendo Entertainment System triggered a fierce battle for market share in the United States and Europe known as the "console war". This drew attention to the video game industry, and the Genesis and several of its games attracted legal scrutiny on matters involving reverse engineering and video game violence. Controversy surrounding violent games such as Night Trap and Mortal Kombat led Sega to create the Videogame Rating Council, a predecessor to the Entertainment Software Rating Board.

Sega released Mega Drive add-ons including the Sega CD (Mega-CD outside North America), which plays games on compact disc and can display full-motion video; the 32X, a peripheral with 32-bit processing power that can display polygons for 3D gaming; and the LaserActive, developed by Pioneer, which runs Mega-LD games on LaserDisc. None were successful, and the resulting hardware fragmentation created consumer confusion.

Genesis/Mega Drive sold 30.75 million units worldwide. In addition, Tectoy sold an estimated 3 million licensed variants in Brazil, Majesco projected it would sell 1.5 million licensed variants of the system in the United States and smaller numbers were sold by Samsung in South Korea. By the mid-2010s, licensed third-party Genesis rereleases were still being sold by AtGames in North America and Europe. Many games have been re-released in compilations or on online services such as the Virtual Console, Xbox Live Arcade, PlayStation Network, and Steam. The Genesis was succeeded in 1994 by the Sega Saturn.

== History ==
=== Development ===
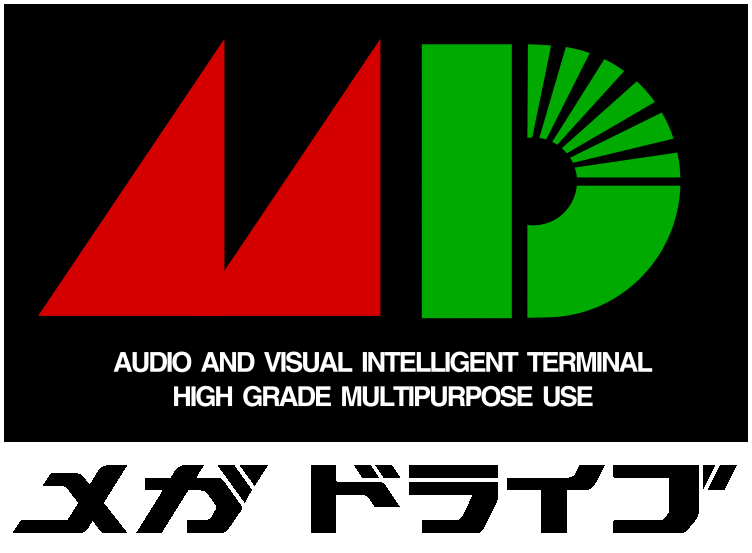
The Japanese Mega Drive logo

In the early 1980s, Sega Enterprises, Inc. – then a subsidiary of Gulf+Western – was one of the top five arcade game manufacturers active in the United States, as company revenues surpassed $200 million between July 1981 and June 1982. A downturn in the arcade business starting in 1982 seriously hurt the company, leading Gulf+Western to sell its North American arcade manufacturing organization and the licensing rights for its arcade games to Bally Manufacturing. The company retained Sega's North American R&D operation, as well as its Japanese subsidiary, Sega Enterprises, Ltd. With its arcade business in decline, Sega Enterprises, Ltd. president Hayao Nakayama advocated that the company leverage its hardware expertise to move into the home console market in Japan, which was in its infancy at the time.

Nakayama received permission to proceed with this project, leading to the release of Sega's first home video game system, the SG-1000, in July 1983. While it had sold 160,000 units in Japan, far exceeding Sega's expectations, sales at stores were dominated by Nintendo's Famicom which had been released the same day. Sega estimated that the Famicom outsold the SG-1000 by a 10-to-1 margin. The SG-1000 was replaced by the Sega Mark III within two years. In the meantime, Gulf+Western began to divest itself of its non-core businesses after the death of company founder Charles Bluhdorn, so Nakayama and former Sega CEO David Rosen arranged a management buyout of the Japanese subsidiary in 1984 with financial backing from CSK Corporation, a prominent Japanese software company. Nakayama was then installed as CEO of Sega Enterprises, Ltd.

In 1986, Sega redesigned the Mark III for release in North America as the Master System. This was followed by a European release the next year. Although the Master System was a success in Europe, and later in Brazil, it failed to ignite significant interest in the Japanese or North American markets, which, by the mid-to-late 1980s, were both dominated by Nintendo. With Sega continuing to have difficulty penetrating the home market, Sega's console R&D team, led by Masami Ishikawa and supervised by Hideki Sato, began work on a successor to the Master System almost immediately after that console launched.

In 1987, Sega faced another threat to its console business when Japanese computer giant NEC released the PC Engine amid great publicity. To remain competitive against the two more established consumer electronics companies, Ishikawa and his team decided they needed to incorporate a 16-bit microprocessor into their new system to make an impact in the marketplace and once again turned to Sega's strengths in the arcade industry to adapt the successful Sega System 16 arcade board into architecture for a home console. The decision to use a Motorola 68000 as the main CPU was made late in development, while a Zilog Z80 was used as a secondary CPU for sound due to fears that the load to the main CPU would be too great if it handled both the visuals and the audio. The 68000 chip was expensive and would have driven the retail price of the console up greatly, but Sega negotiated with a distributor for a tenth of its price on an up-front volume order with the promise of more orders pending the console's future success.

The appearance of the Mega Drive was designed by a team led by Mitsushige Shiraiwa that drew inspiration from audiophile equipment and automobiles. Shiraiwa said this more mature look helped to target the Mega Drive to all ages, unlike the Famicom, which was aimed primarily at children. According to Sato, the Japanese design for the Mega Drive was based on the appearance of an audio player, with "16-bit" embossed in a golden metallic veneer to create an impression of power.

Sega announced the console as the Mark V in the June 1988 issue of the Japanese gaming magazine Beep!, but Sega management wanted a stronger name. After reviewing more than 300 proposals, they settled on "Mega Drive". In North America, the name was changed to "Genesis". Rosen said he insisted on the name as he disliked "Mega Drive" and wanted to represent "a new beginning" for Sega. Sato said some design elements changed, such as the gold "16-bit" wording, in case it was mistaken for yellow. He believed the changes represented different Japanese and American cultural values.

=== Launch ===
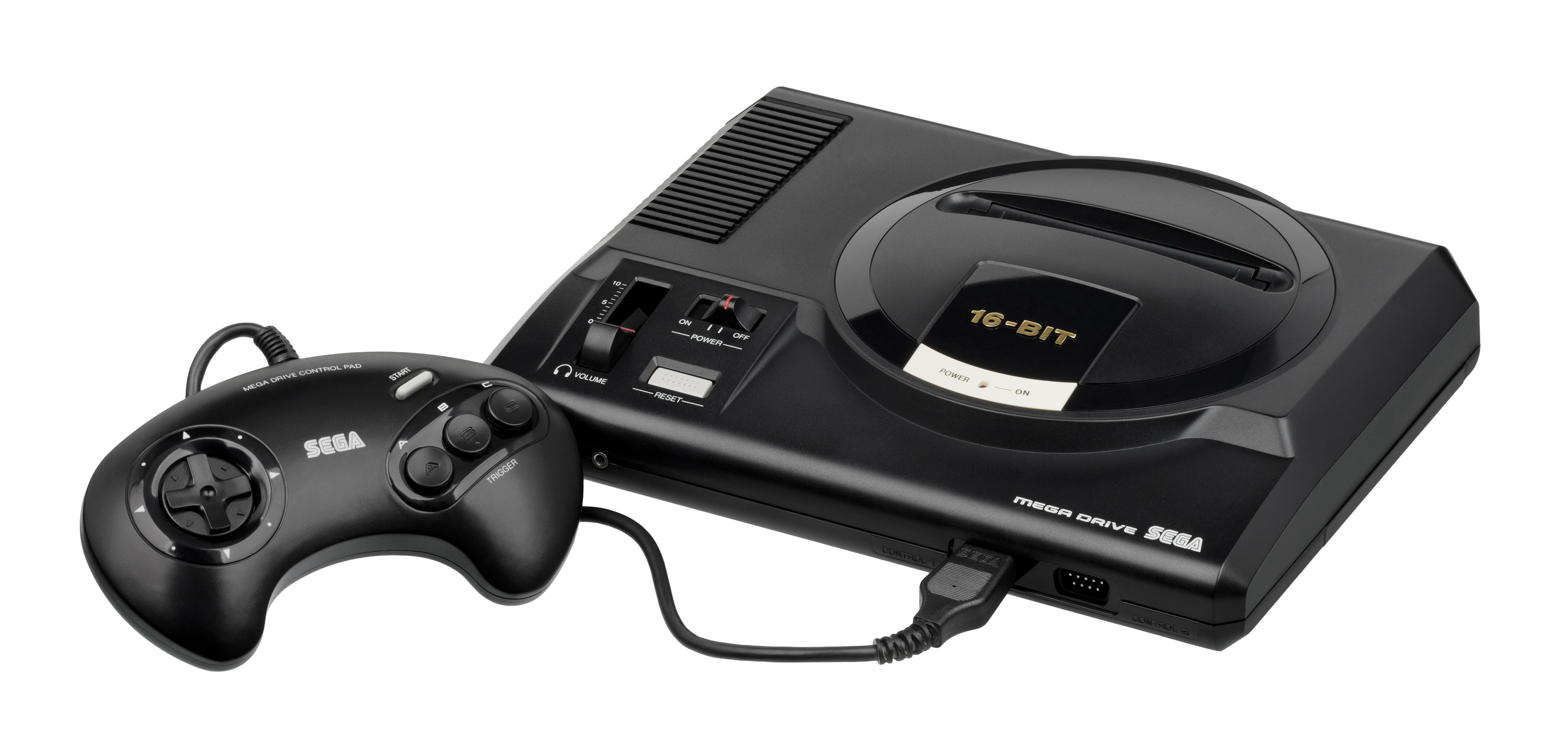
The PAL Mega Drive launched in 1990 and became the highest-selling fourth-gen console in Europe.

Sega released the Mega Drive in Japan on October 29, 1988, though the launch was overshadowed by Nintendo's release of Super Mario Bros. 3 a week earlier. Positive coverage from magazines Famitsu and Beep! helped to establish a following. Within two days of release, the console's initial production run sold out. However, Sega only managed to ship 400,000 units in the first year. In order to increase sales, Sega released various peripherals and games, including an online banking system and answering machine called the Sega Mega Anser. Nevertheless, the Mega Drive was unable to overtake the venerable Famicom and remained a distant third in Japan behind Nintendo's Super Famicom and NEC's PC Engine throughout the 16-bit era.

At the time, Sega did not possess a North American sales and marketing organization and was distributing its Master System through Tonka. Dissatisfied with Tonka's performance, Sega looked for a new partner to market the Genesis in North America and offered the rights to Atari Corporation, which did not yet have a 16-bit system. David Rosen made the proposal to Atari CEO Jack Tramiel and the president of Atari's Entertainment Electronics Division, Michael Katz. Tramiel declined to acquire the new console, deeming it too expensive, and instead opted to focus on the Atari ST. Sega decided to launch the console through its own Sega of America subsidiary. It officially launched in September 1989, though a handful of units reached retailer shelves in New York and Los Angeles in late August.

The European version of the Mega Drive was released in September 1990, at a price of £189.99, i.e. $337 (equivalent to $773 in 2025). The release was handled by Virgin Mastertronic, which was later purchased by Sega in 1991 and became Sega of Europe. Games like Space Harrier II, Ghouls 'n Ghosts, Super Thunder Blade, and The Revenge of Shinobi were available in stores at launch. The console was also bundled with Altered Beast. The Mega Drive and its first batch of games were shown at the 1990 European Computer Entertainment Show (ECES) in Earl's Court. Between July and August 1990, Virgin initially placed their order for 20,000 Mega Drive units. However, the company increased the order by 10,000 units when advanced orders had exceeded expectations, and another 10,000 units was later added following the console's success at the ECES event. The projected number of units to be sold between September and December 1990 had eventually increased to 40,000 units in the United Kingdom alone.

Other companies assisted in distributing the console to various countries worldwide. Ozisoft handled the Mega Drive's launch and marketing in Australia, as it had done before with the Master System. In Brazil, the Mega Drive was released by Tectoy in 1990, only a year after the Brazilian release of the Master System. Tectoy produced games exclusively for the Brazilian market and brought the Sega Meganet online service there in 1995. Samsung handled sales and distribution in Korea, where it was named Super Gam*Boy and retained the Mega Drive logo alongside the Samsung name. It was later renamed Super Aladdin Boy. In India, Sega entered a distribution deal with Shaw Wallace in April 1994 in order to circumvent an 80% import tariff, with each unit selling for INR₹18,000.

In Russia, Sega officially licensed the console to local distributor Forrus in 1994, replaced in 1996 by Bitman. That year, the video game console market generated between $200,000,000 (equivalent to $423,000,000 in 2025) and $250,000,000 (equivalent to $528,000,000 in 2025) in Russia, with Sega accounting for half of all console sales in the country. However, only about 15% of the sales were official Sega units distributed by Bitman, while the rest were unofficial counterfeit clones.

=== North American sales and marketing ===
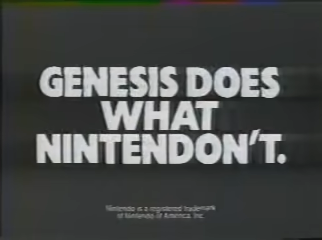
Screenshot from Genesis commercial

For the North American market, former Atari Corporation Entertainment Electronics Division president and new Sega of America CEO Michael Katz instituted a two-part approach to build sales. The first part involved a marketing campaign to challenge Nintendo head-on and emphasize the more arcade-like experience available on the Genesis, with slogans including "Genesis does what Nintendon't". Since Nintendo owned the console rights to most arcade games of the time, the second part involved creating a library of recognizable games which used the names and likenesses of celebrities and athletes, such as Pat Riley Basketball, Arnold Palmer Tournament Golf, James 'Buster' Douglas Knockout Boxing, Joe Montana Football, Tommy Lasorda Baseball, Mario Lemieux Hockey, and Michael Jackson's Moonwalker.

Nonetheless, Sega struggled to overcome Nintendo's presence in consumers' homes. Tasked by Nakayama to sell one million units within the first year, Katz and Sega of America sold only 500,000. At the Winter Consumer Electronics Show in January 1990, the Sega Genesis demonstrated a strong line-up of games which received a positive reception for approaching arcade-quality graphics and gameplay as well as for providing non-arcade experiences such as Phantasy Star II.

In mid-1990, Nakayama hired Tom Kalinske to replace Katz as CEO of Sega of America. Although Kalinske knew little about the video game market, he surrounded himself with industry-savvy advisors. A believer in the razor and blades model, he developed a four-point plan: cut the price of the console, create an American team to develop games targeted at the American market, expand the aggressive advertising campaigns, and replace the bundled game Altered Beast with a new game, Sonic the Hedgehog. The Japanese board of directors initially disapproved of the plan, but all four points were approved by Nakayama, who told Kalinske, "I hired you to make the decisions for Europe and the Americas, so go ahead and do it."

Critics praised Sonic as one of the greatest games yet made, and Genesis sales increased as customers who had been waiting for the release of the international version of Nintendo's Super Famicom, the Super Nintendo Entertainment System (SNES), decided to purchase a Genesis instead. The SNES debuted against an established competitor, while NEC's TurboGrafx-16 failed to gain traction, and NEC soon pulled out of the market. In large part due to the popularity of Sonic the Hedgehog, the Genesis outsold the SNES in the United States nearly two to one during the 1991 holiday season. Sega controlled 65% of the 16-bit console market in January 1992, the first time Nintendo had not been the console leader since 1985.

The Genesis outsold the SNES for four consecutive Christmas seasons due to its two-year lead, lower price point, and larger game library compared to the SNES at its release. Sega had ten games for every game on SNES, and while the SNES had an exclusive version of Final Fight, one of Sega's internal development teams created Streets of Rage, which had bigger levels, tougher enemies, and a well-regarded soundtrack. ASCII Entertainment reported in early 1993 that Genesis had 250 games versus 75 for the SNES, but limited shelf space meant that stores typically offered 100 Genesis and 50 SNES games. The NES was still the leader, with 300 games and 100 on shelves.

Sega's advertising positioned the Genesis as the cooler console, and coined the term blast processing, an obscure and unused graphics programming method, to suggest that its processing capabilities were far greater than those of the SNES. A Sony focus group found that teenage boys would not admit to owning an SNES rather than a Genesis.

With the Genesis often outselling the SNES at a ratio of 2:1, Nintendo and Sega focused heavily on impression management of the market, even going to the point of deception; Nintendo claimed it had sold more consoles in 1991 than it actually had, and forecasted it would sell 6 million consoles by the end of 1992, while its actual U.S. install base at the end of 1992 was only just more than 4 million units. Due to these tactics, it was difficult to ascertain a clear leader in market share for several years at a time, with Nintendo's dollar share of the U.S. 16-bit market dipping down from 60% at the end of 1992 to 37% at the end of 1993, Sega claiming 55% of all 16-bit hardware sales during 1994, and Donkey Kong Country helping the SNES to outsell the Genesis from 1995 through 1997. According to a 2004 study of NPD sales data, the Genesis maintained its lead over the Super NES in the American 16-bit console market. However, according to a 2014 Wedbush Securities report based on revised NPD sales data, the SNES outsold the Genesis in the U.S. by 1.5 million units.

=== Electronic Arts ===
To compete with Nintendo, Sega was more open to new types of games, but still tightly controlled the approval process for third-party games and charged high prices for cartridge manufacturing. The American publisher Electronic Arts (EA) sought a better deal, but met resistance from Sega. They decided to reverse-engineer the Genesis, using a clean-room method similar to the method Phoenix Technologies had used to reverse-engineer the IBM Personal Computer BIOS around 1984.

The process began in 1989, led by Steve Hayes and Jim Nitchals. They created a controlled room in EA headquarters nicknamed "Chernobyl", to which only one person was allowed access, Mike Schwartz. Schwartz reviewed Sega's copyrighted development manuals and tools, studied the Genesis hardware and games, and wrote original documentation that summarized his findings. The process took him about a month. His work was reviewed by EA's lawyers before being disseminated to Hayes and Nitchals to verify its originality, and subsequently to the rest of the developers to let them build games. After a few months, EA began developing for the Genesis in earnest. The EA founder, Trip Hawkins, confronted Nakayama the day before the 1990 Consumer Electronics Show (CES), informing him that EA had the ability to run its own licensing program if Sega refused to meet its demands. Sega relented, and the next day EA's upcoming Genesis games were showcased at CES.

EA signed what Hawkins described as "a very unusual and much more enlightened license agreement" with Sega in June 1990: "Among other things, we had the right to make as many titles as we wanted. We could approve our own titles ... the royalty rates were a lot more reasonable. We also had more direct control over manufacturing." After the deal was in place, EA chief creative officer Bing Gordon learned that "we hadn't figured out all the workarounds" and "Sega still had the ability to lock us out ... It just would have been a public relations fiasco." EA released its first Genesis games, Populous and Budokan: The Martial Spirit, within the month. The first Genesis version of EA's John Madden Football arrived before the end of 1990, and became what Gordon called a "killer app". Taking advantage of the licensing agreement, Gordon and EA's vice president of marketing services, Nancy Fong, created a visual identifier for EA's Genesis cartridges: a yellow tab molded into the casing.

=== Sonic the Hedgehog ===
Sega held a company-wide contest to create a mascot character to compete with Nintendo's Mario series. The winning submission was a blue hedgehog with red shoes, Sonic, created by Naoto Ohshima, spawning one of the best-selling video game franchises in history. The gameplay of Sonic the Hedgehog originated with a tech demo created by Yuji Naka, who had developed a prototype platform game that involved a fast-moving character rolling in a ball through a long winding tube. This concept was developed with Ohshima's character design and levels conceived by designer Hirokazu Yasuhara.

Although Katz and Sega of America's marketing experts disliked Sonic, certain that it would not catch on with American children, Kalinske's strategy to place Sonic the Hedgehog as the pack-in game paid off. Sonic the Hedgehog greatly increased the popularity of the Genesis in North America, and the bundle is credited with helping Sega gain 65% of the market share against Nintendo. Similarly, in Europe, Sega captured a 65% share of the European console market, where the Mega Drive maintained its lead over the SNES through 1994. Sonic the Hedgehog 2 set records for the fastest-selling game, selling 3.2 million copies worldwide within two weeks, and Sonic the Hedgehog 3 and Sonic & Knuckles sold a combined 4 million copies worldwide.

=== Trademark Security System and Sega v. Accolade ===
After the release of the Genesis in 1989, video game publisher Accolade began exploring options to release some of their PC games on the console. At the time, Sega had a licensing deal in place for third-party developers that increased the costs to the developer. According to Accolade co-founder Alan Miller, "One pays them between $10 and $15 per cartridge on top of the real hardware manufacturing costs, so it about doubles the cost of goods to the independent publisher." To get around licensing, Accolade chose to seek an alternative way to bring their games to the Genesis. It did so by purchasing one in order to decompile the executable code of three Genesis games. Such information was used to program their new Genesis cartridges in a way that would allow them to disable the security lockouts on the Genesis that prevented unlicensed games from being played. This strategy was used successfully to bring Ishido: The Way of Stones to the Genesis in 1990. To do so, Accolade had copied Sega's copyrighted game code multiple times in order to reverse engineer the software of Sega's licensed Genesis games.

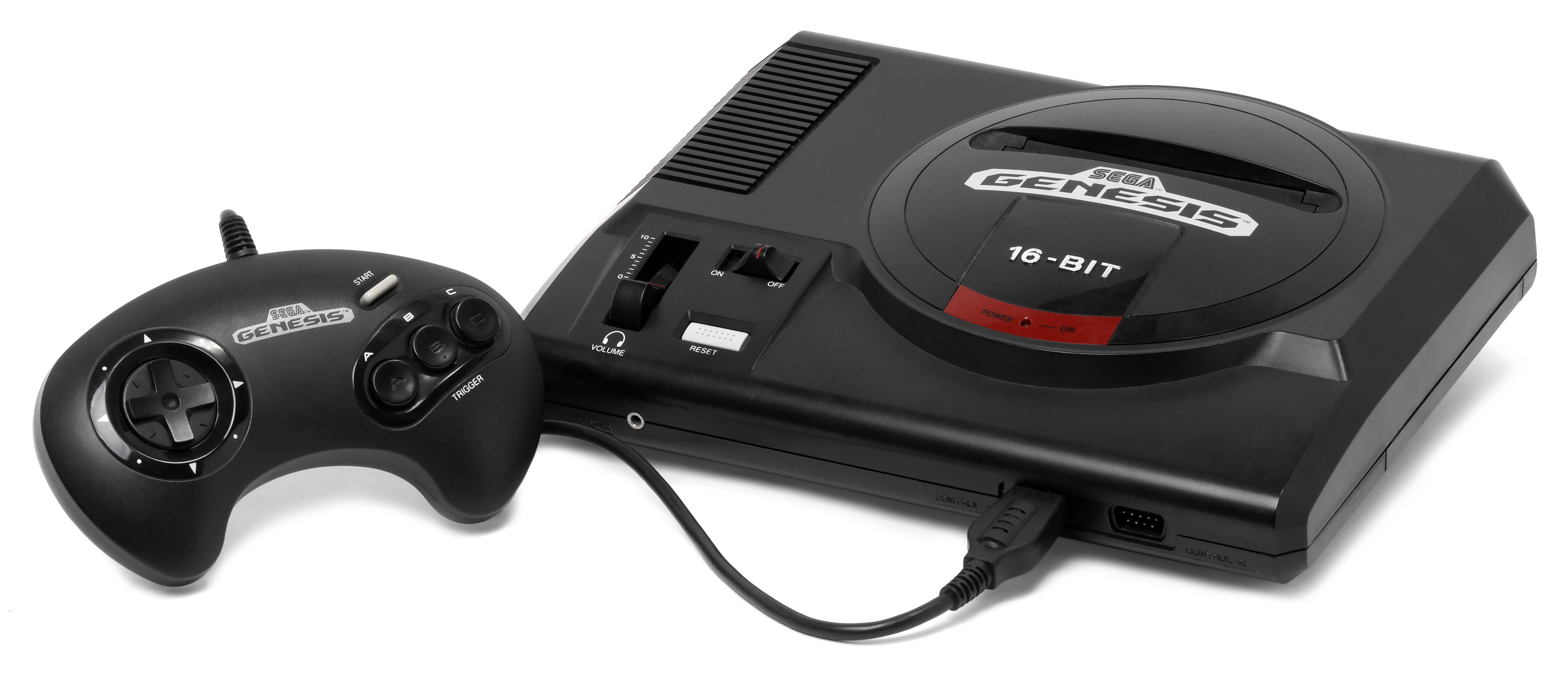
An edition of the original model of the Genesis, known as the Genesis III, was the model at the center of Sega v. Accolade for its incorporation of the Trademark Security System (TMSS).

As a result of piracy in some countries and unlicensed development issues, Sega incorporated a technical protection mechanism into a new edition of the Genesis released in 1991, referred to as the Genesis III. This new variation of the Genesis included a code known as the Trademark Security System (TMSS), which, when a game cartridge was inserted, would check for the presence of the string "SEGA" at a particular point in the memory contained in the cartridge. If the string was present, the console would run the game, and would briefly display the message: "Produced by or under license from Sega Enterprises, Ltd." This system had a twofold effect: it added extra protection against unlicensed developers and software piracy and forced the Sega trademark to display when the game was powered up, making a lawsuit for trademark infringement possible if unlicensed software were to be developed. Accolade learned of this development at the Winter Consumer Electronics Show in January 1991, where Sega showed the new Genesis III and demonstrated it screening and rejecting an Ishido game cartridge. With more games planned for the following year, Accolade successfully identified the TMSS file. It later added this file to the games HardBall!, Star Control, Mike Ditka Power Football, and Turrican.

In response to the creation of these unlicensed games, Sega filed suit against Accolade in the United States District Court for the Northern District of California, on charges of trademark infringement, unfair competition, and copyright infringement. In response, Accolade filed a counterclaim for falsifying the source of its games by displaying the Sega trademark when the game was powered up. Although the district court initially ruled for Sega and issued an injunction preventing Accolade from continuing to reverse engineer the Genesis, Accolade appealed the verdict to the United States Court of Appeals for the Ninth Circuit.

As a result of the appeal, the Ninth Circuit overturned the district court's verdict and ruled that Accolade's decompilation of the Sega software constituted fair use. The court's written opinion followed on October 20, 1992, and noted that the use of the software was non-exploitative, although commercial. Further, the court found that the trademark infringement, being required by the TMSS for a Genesis game to run on the system, had been inadvertently triggered by a fair use act and was the fault of Sega for having caused false labeling. Ultimately, Sega and Accolade settled the case on April 30, 1993. As a part of this settlement, Accolade became an official licensee of Sega, and later developed and released Barkley Shut Up and Jam! while under license. The terms of the licensing, including whether or not any special arrangements or discounts were made to Accolade, were not released to the public. The financial terms of the settlement were also not disclosed, although both companies agreed to pay their own legal costs.

=== Congressional hearings on video game violence ===
VRC MA-13 rating, as applied to Mortal Kombat for the Genesis

In 1993, the American media began to focus on the mature content of certain video games. Games such as Night Trap for the Sega CD, an add-on, received unprecedented scrutiny. Issues about Night Trap were brought up in the United Kingdom, with former Sega of Europe development director Mike Brogan noting that "Night Trap got Sega an awful lot of publicity ... it was also cited in UK Parliament for being classified as '15' due to its use of real actors." This came at a time when Sega was capitalizing on its image as an edgy company with attitude, and this only reinforced that image. By far the year's most controversial game was Midway's Mortal Kombat, ported to the Genesis and SNES by Acclaim Entertainment. In response to public outcry over the game's graphic violence, Nintendo decided to replace the blood in the game with "sweat" and the arcade's gruesome "fatalities" with less violent finishing moves. Sega took a different approach, instituting America's first video game ratings system, the Videogame Rating Council (VRC), for all its current systems. Ratings ranged from the family-friendly GA rating to the more mature rating of MA-13, and the adults-only rating of MA-17. With the rating system in place, Sega released its version of Mortal Kombat, appearing to have removed all the blood and sweat effects and toning down the finishing moves even more than in the SNES version. However, all the arcade's blood and uncensored finishing moves could be enabled by entering a "Blood Code". This technicality allowed Sega to release the game with a relatively low MA-13 rating. Meanwhile, the tamer SNES version shipped without a rating.

The Genesis version of Mortal Kombat was well-received by gaming press, as well as fans, outselling the SNES version three- or four-to-one, while Nintendo was criticized for censoring the SNES version. Executive vice president of Nintendo of America Howard Lincoln was quick to point out at the hearings that Night Trap had no such rating, saying to Senator Joe Lieberman:

Furthermore, I can't let you sit here and buy this nonsense that this Sega Night Trap game was somehow only meant for adults. The fact of the matter is this is a copy of the packaging. There was no rating on this game at all when the game was introduced. Small children bought this at Toys "R" Us, and he knows that as well as I do. When they started getting heat about this game, then they adopted the rating system and put ratings on it.

In response, Sega of America vice president Bill White showed a videotape of violent video games on the SNES and stressed the importance of rating video games. At the end of the hearing, Lieberman called for another hearing in February 1994 to check on progress toward a rating system for video game violence.

As a result of the congressional hearings, Night Trap started to generate more sales and released ports to the PC, Sega 32X, and 3DO. According to Digital Pictures founder Tom Zito, "You know, I sold 50,000 units of Night Trap a week after those hearings." Although experiencing increased sales, Sega decided to recall Night Trap and re-release it with revisions in 1994 due to the congressional hearings. After the close of these hearings, video game manufacturers came together to establish the rating system that Lieberman had called for. Initially, Sega proposed the universal adoption of its system, but after objections by Nintendo and others, Sega took a role in forming a new one. This became the Entertainment Software Rating Board, an independent organization that received praise from Lieberman. With this new rating system in place for the 1994 holiday season, Nintendo decided its censorship policies were no longer needed, and the SNES port of Mortal Kombat II was released uncensored.

=== 32-bit era and beyond ===
Sega released two add-ons to increase the Genesis capabilities: a CD peripheral, the Sega CD (Mega-CD outside North America and Brazil), and a 32-bit peripheral, the Sega 32X. Worldwide, Sega sold 2.24 million Sega CD units and 800,000 32X units.

Following the launch of the next-generation 32-bit Sony PlayStation and Sega Saturn, sales of 16-bit hardware and software continued to account for 64% of the video game market in 1995. Sega underestimated the continued popularity of the Genesis and did not have the inventory to meet demand. Sega captured 43% of the dollar share of the U.S. video game market and claimed to have sold more than two million Genesis units in 1995, while Genesis software such as Vectorman remained successful, but Kalinske estimated that "we could have sold another 300,000 Genesis systems in the November/December timeframe". Nakayama's decision to focus on the Saturn, based on the systems' relative performance in Japan, has been cited as the major contributing factor in this miscalculation. By contrast, Nintendo concentrated on the 16-bit home console market, as well as its successful handheld, the Game Boy, and took in 42% of the video game market dollar share without launching a 32-bit console. Following tensions with Sega Enterprises, Ltd. over its focus on the Saturn, Kalinske, who oversaw the rise of the Genesis in 1991, lost interest in the business and resigned in mid-1996.

Sega sold 30.75 million Genesis units worldwide. Of these, 3.58 million were sold in Japan, and sales in Europe and the U.S. are roughly estimated at 8 million and 18–18.5 million as of June 1997 (at which time Sega was no longer manufacturing the system) respectively.

Japanese FY	Shipping			
Japanese FY	Japan	America	Europe	World
FY3/1989	0.40	-	-	0.40
FY3/1990	0.60	0.40	-	1.00
FY3/1991	0.90	0.90	0.60	2.40
FY3/1992	0.70	1.70	1.20	3.60
FY3/1993	0.40	3.80	3.30	7.50
FY3/1994	0.45	5.05	2.15	7.65
FY3/1995	0.10	3.81		3.91
FY3/1996	0.03	2.05		2.08
Total	3.58	24.96		28.54

In 1998, Sega licensed the Genesis to Majesco to rerelease it in North America. Majesco began reselling millions of unsold cartridges at a budget price, together with 150,000 units of the second model of the Genesis. It released the Genesis 3, projecting to sell 1.5 million units of the console by the end of 1998. As of 2012, Tectoy had sold an estimated 3 million Genesis units. However, some sources claim that the console sold 40 million units during its lengthy lifespan without specifying whether third-party variants are being considered.

== Technical specifications ==
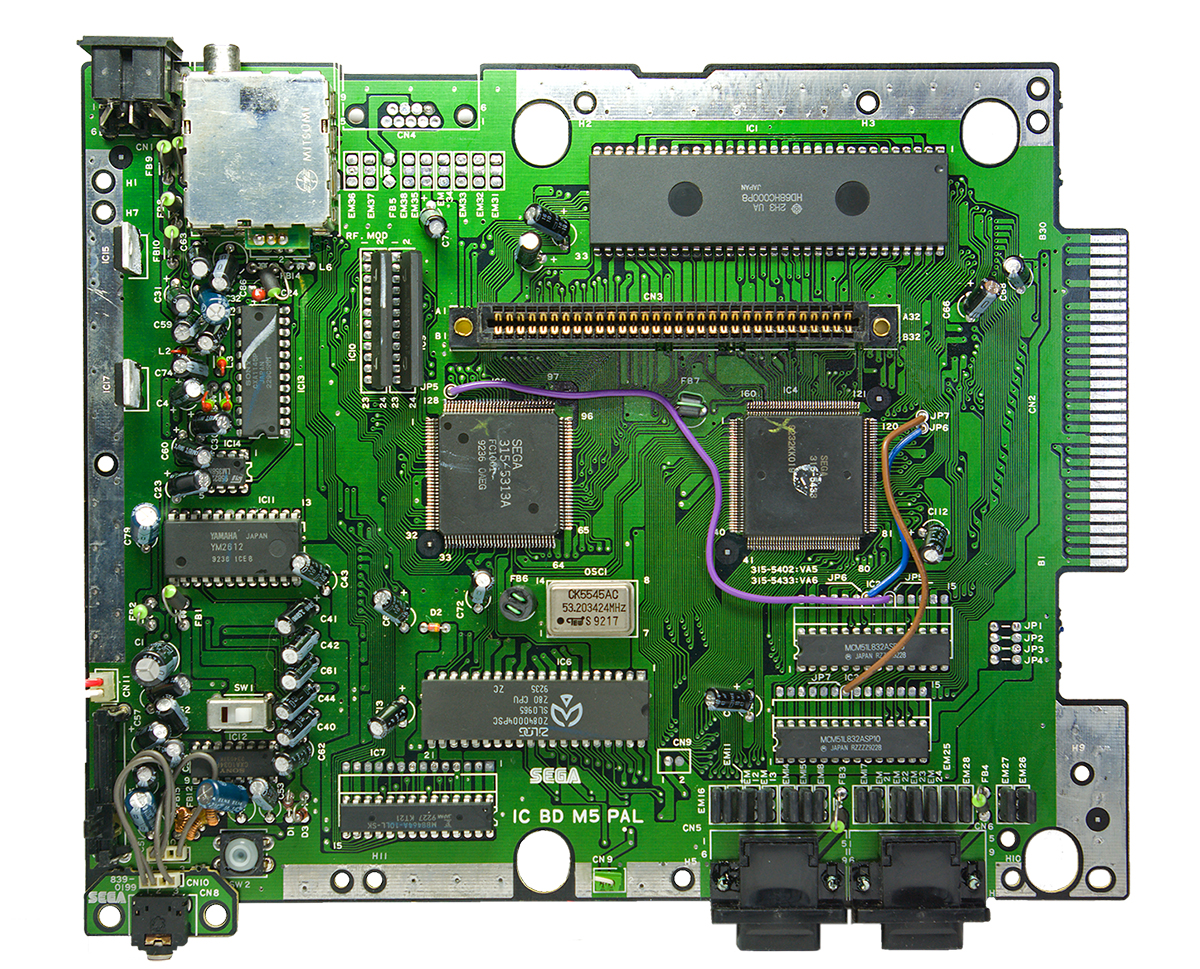
European Mega Drive mainboard

The main microprocessor is a 16/32-bit Motorola 68000 CPU clocked at 7.6 MHz. An 8-bit Zilog Z80 processor controls the sound hardware and provides backward compatibility with the Master System. The Genesis has 64 KB of RAM, 64 KB of video RAM and 8 KB of audio RAM. It can display up to 61 colors at once from a palette of 512. The games are in ROM cartridge format and inserted in the top.

The Genesis produces sound using a Texas Instruments SN76489 programmable sound generator, integrated with the Video Display Processor (VDP), and a Yamaha YM2612 FM synthesizer chip. The Z80 processor is primarily used to control both sound chips to produce stereo music and sound effects. Most revisions of the original Genesis contain a discrete YM2612 and a separate YM7101 VDP; in a later revision, the chips were integrated into a single custom ASIC (FC1004).

The back of the Model 1 console provides an RF output port (designed for use with antenna and cable systems) and a specialized 8-pin DIN port, which both provide video and audio output. Both outputs produce monophonic sound; a headphone jack on the front of the console produces stereo sound. On the Model 2, the DIN port, RF output port, and headphone jack are replaced by a 9-pin mini-DIN port on the back for composite video, RGB and stereo sound, and the standard RF switch. Earlier Model 1 consoles have a 9-pin extension port. An edge connector on the bottom right of the console can be connected to a peripheral.

=== Peripherals ===
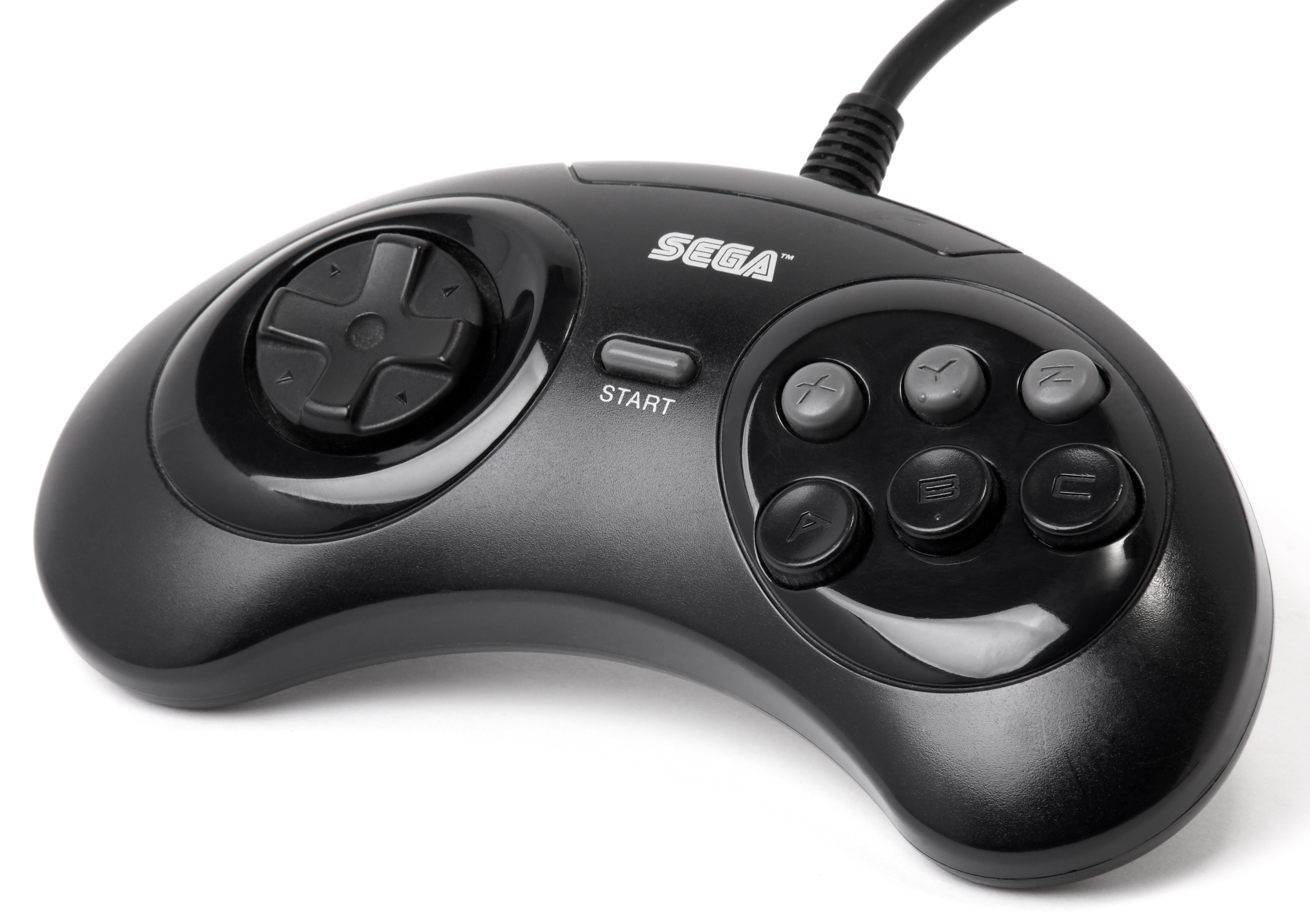
Genesis six-button controller

The standard controller features a rounded shape, a directional pad, three main buttons, and a start button. In 1993, Sega released a slightly smaller pad with three additional face buttons, similar to the design of buttons on arcade fighting games such as Street Fighter II. Sega also released a wireless revision of the six-button controller, the Remote Arcade Pad.

The system is backward compatible with the Master System. The first peripheral is the Power Base Converter (Mega Adaptor in Japan and Master System Converter in Europe), which allows Master System games to be played. It is designed for the Model 1 revisions and will work with the Model 2 revisions, however the shell blocks the power and AC ports of the Model 2 revision, meaning that the converter must have its shell modified or by using a pass-through adaptor. A second model known as the Master System Converter II was released only in Europe for use with the Mega Drive II, which works with other region Genesis consoles and revisions but lacks the ability to use Master System cards. Both the original Power Base Converter and the Master System Converter II do not work with the Nomad or the Genesis 3.

Other peripherals were released to add functionality. The Menacer is a wireless infrared light gun used with compatible games. Other third parties created light gun peripherals, such as American Laser Games and Konami. Released for art creation software, the Sega Mega Mouse features three buttons and is only compatible with a few games, such as Eye of the Beholder. A foam-covered bat called the Batter Up and the TeeV Golf golf club were released for both the Genesis and SNES.

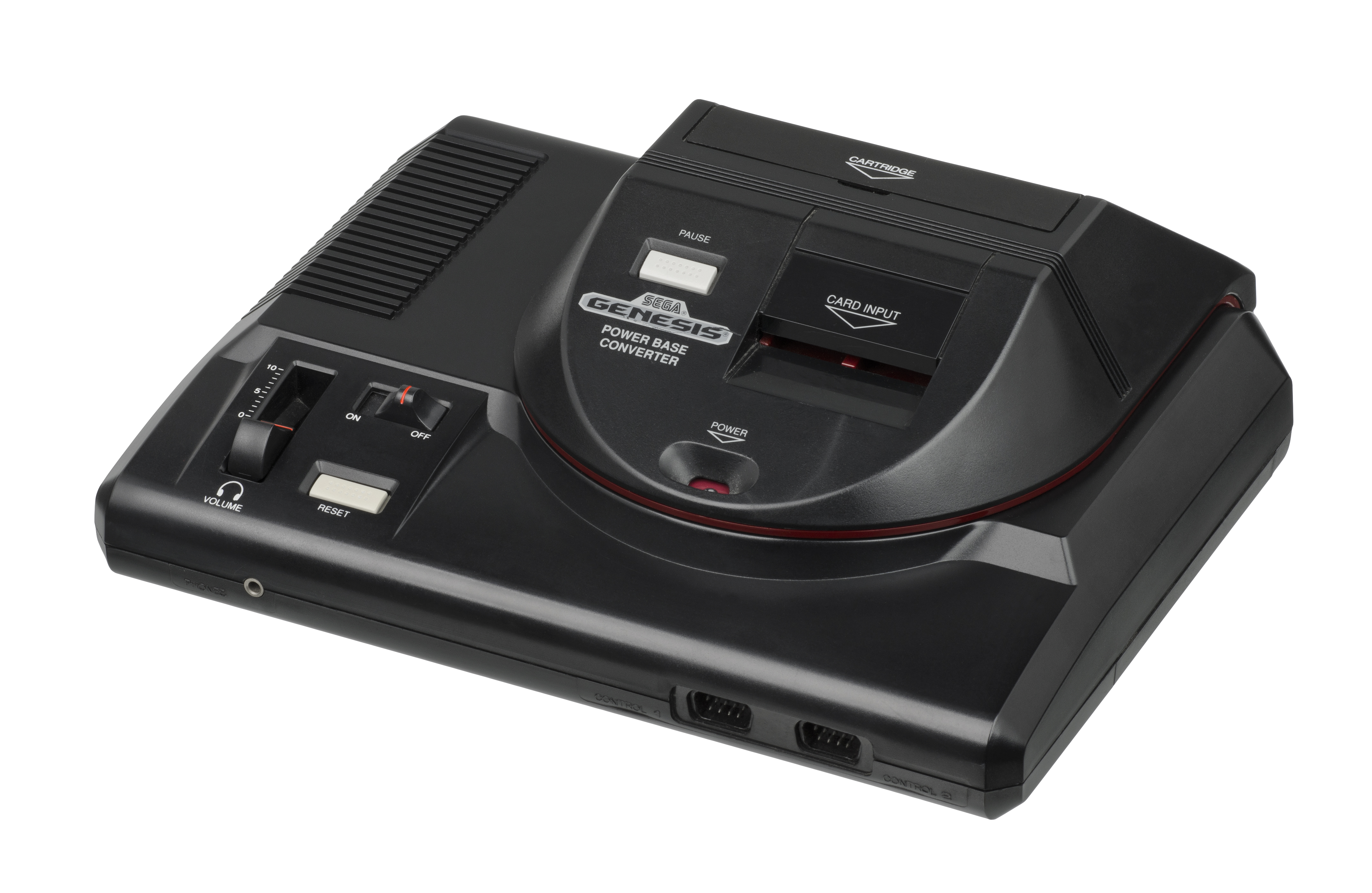
Sega Power Base Converter on a Model 1 Genesis

In November 1993, Sega released the Sega Activator, an octagonal device that lies flat on the floor and was designed to translate the player's physical movements into game inputs. It was first shown at the January 1993 Consumer Electronics Show (CES), where it was demonstrated with Streets of Rage 2. Several high-profile games, including Mortal Kombat and Street Fighter II: Special Champion Edition, were adapted to support the peripheral. The device was a commercial failure, due mainly to its inaccuracy and its high price point. IGN editor Craig Harris ranked the Sega Activator the third-worst video game controller ever made.

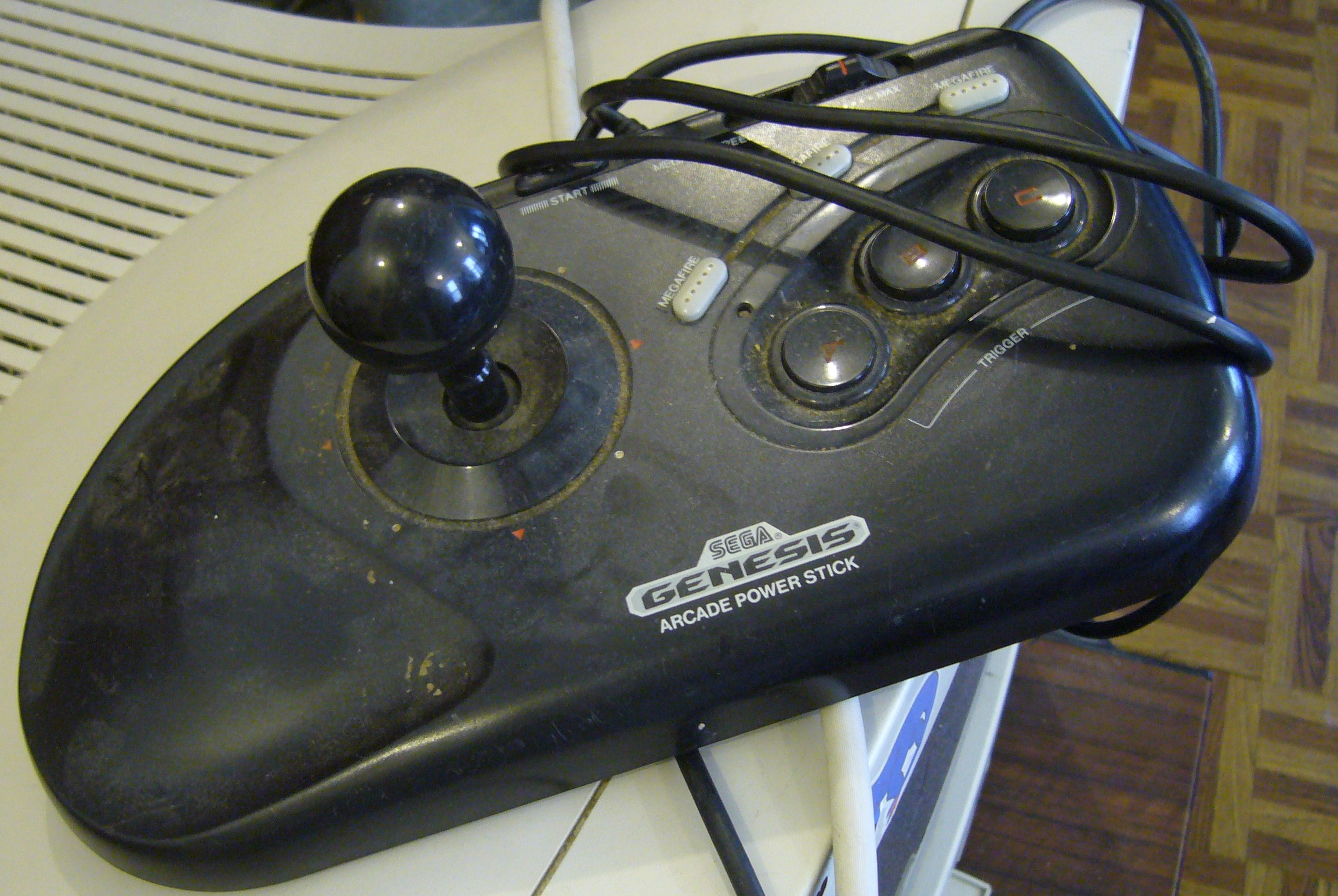
The Arcade Power Stick

Both EA and Sega released multitaps to allow more than two players to play at once. Initially, EA's version, the 4 Way Play, and Sega's adapter, the Team Player, only supported each publisher's games. In response to complaints, Sega said a new Team Player, which would work with all Genesis multitap games, would be released. Later games were created to work on both the 4 Way Play and Team Player. Codemasters also developed the J-Cart system, providing two extra ports on the cartridge itself, although the technology came late in the console's life and is only featured on a few games. Sega planned to release a steering wheel peripheral in 1994, and the Genesis version of Virtua Racing was advertised as "steering wheel compatible", but the peripheral was cancelled.

=== Network services ===
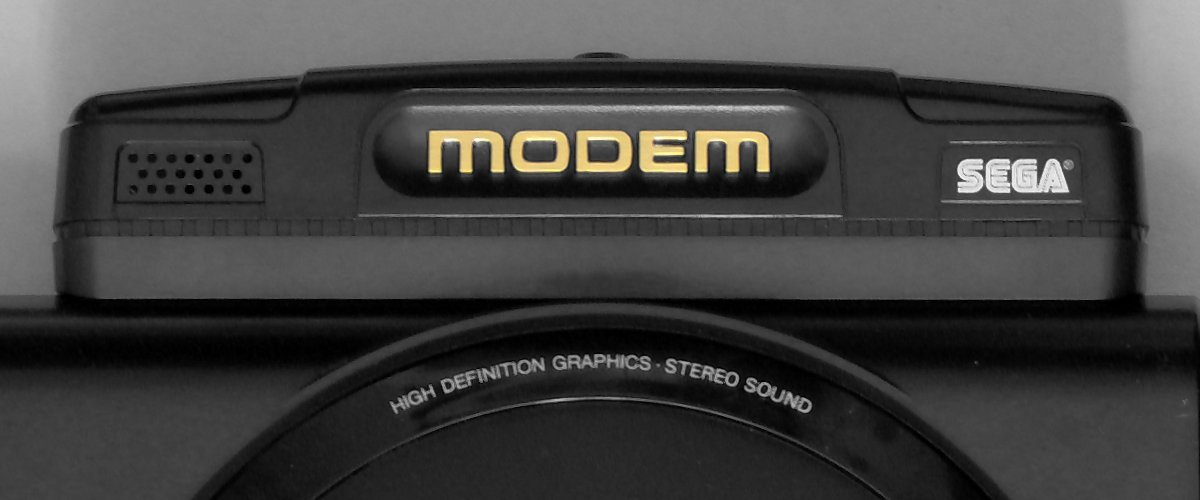
The Mega Modem peripheral, which allowed access to the Sega Meganet service

In its first foray into online gaming, Sega created Sega Meganet, which debuted in Japan on November 3, 1990. Operating through a cartridge and a peripheral called the "Mega Modem", this allowed Mega Drive players to play a total of seventeen games online. A North American version, dubbed "Tele-Genesis", was announced at the Winter Consumer Electronics Show (Winter CES) in January 1990 but never released, though a version was operated in Brazil starting in 1995. Another phone-based system, the Mega Anser, turned the Japanese Mega Drive into an online banking terminal.

In 1994, Sega started the Sega Channel, a game distribution system using cable television services Time Warner Cable and TCI. Using a special peripheral, Genesis players could download a game from a library of fifty each month and demos for upcoming releases. Games were downloaded to internal memory and deleted when the console was powered off. The Sega Channel reached 250,000 subscribers at its peak and ran until July 31, 1998, well past the release of the Sega Saturn.

In an effort to compete with Sega, third-party developer Catapult Entertainment created the XBAND, a peripheral which allowed Genesis players to engage in online competitive gaming. Using telephone services to share data, XBAND was initially offered in five U.S. cities in November 1994. The following year, the service was extended to the SNES, and Catapult teamed up with Blockbuster Video to market the service, but as interest in the service waned, it was discontinued in April 1997.

== Library ==
A screenshot of Sonic the Hedgehog, taken from its first level, Green Hill Zone

The Genesis library was initially modest, but eventually grew to contain games to appeal to all types of players. The initial pack-in game was Altered Beast, which was replaced with Sonic the Hedgehog in 1991. Top sellers included Sonic the Hedgehog, Sonic the Hedgehog 2 and Disney's Aladdin. Sega Enterprises focused on developing action games, while Sega of America was tasked with developing sports games. A large part of the appeal of the Genesis library was the arcade-based experience of its games, as well as more difficult entries such as Ecco the Dolphin, and sports games such as Joe Montana Football. Compared to its competition, Sega advertised to an older audience by hosting more mature games, including the uncensored version of Mortal Kombat.

The arcade hit Street Fighter II by Capcom was initially released on the SNES. As the Genesis continued to grow in popularity, Capcom released a Genesis version, Street Fighter II: Champion Edition, which sold more than a million copies. One of the biggest third-party companies to support the Genesis early on was Electronic Arts. Trip Hawkins, founder and then president of EA, believed the faster drawing speed of the Genesis made it more suitable for sport games than the SNES, and credits EA's success on the Genesis for helping catapult the EA Sports brand. Another third-party blockbuster for the system was the port of Mortal Kombat. Although the arcade game was released on the SNES and Genesis simultaneously, the two ports were not identical. The SNES version looked closer to the arcade game, but the Genesis version allowed players to bypass censorship, helping make it more popular. In 1997, Sega of America claimed the Genesis had a software attach rate of 16 games sold per console, double that of the SNES.

=== Sega Virtua Processor ===
The graphics produced by the Sega Virtua Processor are comparable to those of Nintendo's Super FX chip. Here's an example of Virtua Racing gameplay on the Genesis

The Super NES supports the inclusion of enhancement chips inside each cartridge to produce more advanced graphics; for example, the launch game Pilotwings (1990) contains a digital signal processor. Later, the Super FX chip was designed to offload complex rendering tasks from the main CPU. It was first used in Star Fox (1993) for real-time 3D polygons, and Super Mario World 2: Yoshi's Island (1995) demonstrates rotation, scaling, and stretching of individual sprites and manipulates large areas of the screen.

Sega had produced such effects on its arcade platforms, and adapted some to the home console by developing the Sega Virtua Processor (SVP). Based on a digital signal processor core by Samsung Electronics, this chip enables the Genesis to render polygons in real time and provides an "Axis Transformation" unit that handles scaling and rotation. Virtua Racing (1994) is the only game released with this chip and the only Genesis cartridge with any enhancement chip, running at a significantly higher and more stable frame rate than filled polygon games on the SNES. The chip drastically increased the cost of the cartridge, and at US$100 (equivalent to $230 in 2025), Virtua Racing is the most expensive Genesis cartridge ever produced. Two other games, Virtua Fighter and Daytona USA, were planned for the SVP chip, but were instead moved into the Saturn's launch line-up. Sega planned to sell the SVP chip as a separate upgrade module for the Genesis, but it was canceled, in order to focus its efforts on the more powerful 32X add-on.

== Add-ons ==
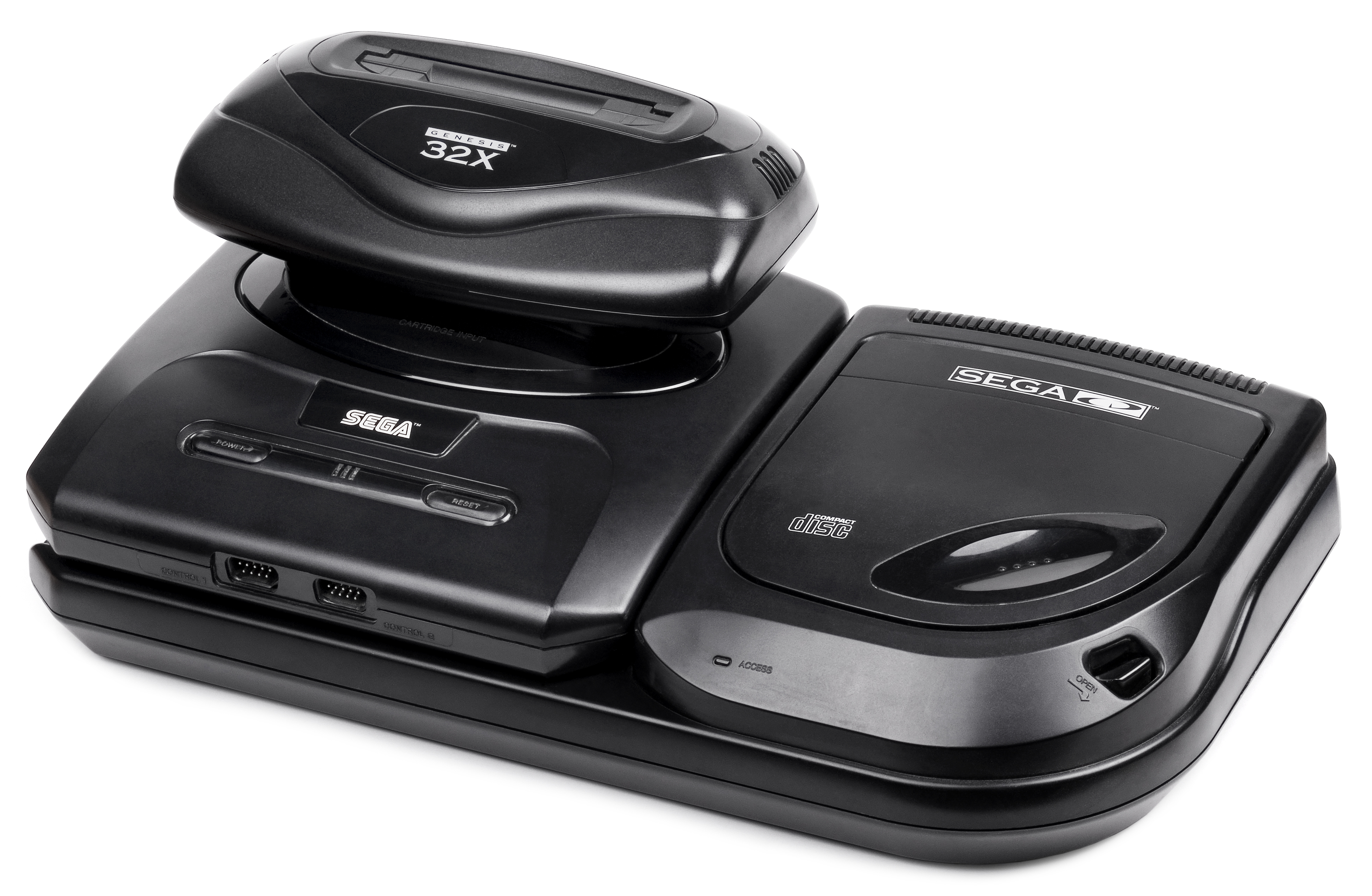
Genesis model 2 with the Sega CD 2 and 32X add-ons attached

In addition to accessories such as the Power Base Converter, the Genesis supports two add-ons that each support their own game libraries. The first is the Sega CD (known as the Mega-CD in all regions except for North America), a compact disc-based peripheral that can play its library of games in CD-ROM format. The second is the Sega 32X, a 32-bit peripheral which uses ROM cartridges and serves as a pass-through for Genesis games. Sega produced a custom power strip to fit the peripherals' large AC adapters. Both add-ons were officially discontinued in 1996.

=== Sega CD ===
By 1991, compact discs had gained in popularity as a data storage device for music and software. PCs and video game companies had started to make use of this technology. NEC had been the first to include CD technology in a game console with the release of the TurboGrafx-CD add-on, and Nintendo was making plans to develop its own CD peripheral as well. Seeing the opportunity to gain an advantage over its rivals, Sega partnered with JVC to develop a CD-ROM add-on for the Genesis. Sega launched the Mega-CD in Japan on December 12, 1991, initially retailing at JP¥49,800. The CD add-on was launched in North America on October 15, 1992, as the Sega CD, with a retail price of US$299; it was released in Europe as the Mega-CD in 1993. In addition to greatly expanding the potential size of its games, this add-on unit upgraded the graphics and sound capabilities by adding a second, more powerful processor, more system memory, and hardware-based scaling and rotation similar to that found in Sega's arcade games. It provided battery-backed storage RAM to allow games to save high scores, configuration data, and game progress.

Shortly after its launch in North America, Sega began shipping the Sega CD with the pack-in game Sewer Shark, a full motion video (FMV) game developed by Digital Pictures, a company that became an important partner for Sega. Touting the benefits of the CD's comparatively vast storage space, Sega and its third-party developers produced a number of games for the add-on that include digital video in their gameplay or as bonus content, as well as re-releasing several cartridge-based games with high-fidelity audio tracks. In 1993, Sega released the Sega CD 2, a smaller and lighter version of the add-on designed for the Genesis II, at a reduced price compared to the original. A limited number of games were later developed that use both the Sega CD and the Sega 32X add-ons.

The Mega-CD sold only 100,000 units during its first year in Japan, falling well below expectations. Although many consumers blamed its high launch price, it also suffered from a tiny software library; only two games were available at launch. This was due in part to the long delay before Sega made its software development kit available to third-party developers. Sales were higher in North America and Europe, although the novelty of FMV and CD-enhanced games quickly wore off, as many later games were met with lukewarm or negative reviews. In 1995, Sega announced a shift in focus to its new console, the Saturn, and discontinued advertising for Genesis hardware. The Sega CD sold 2.24 million units worldwide.

=== Sega 32X ===
With the release of the Saturn scheduled for 1995, Sega began developing a stopgap to bridge the gap between the Genesis and Saturn and serve as a less expensive entry into the 32-bit era. At the Winter Consumer Electronics Show in January 1994, Sega of America research and development head Joe Miller took a phone call from Nakayama, in which Nakayama stressed the importance of a quick response to the Atari Jaguar. One idea came from a concept from Sega Enterprises, referred to by former Sega of America producer Michael Latham as "Genesis 2", which was a new standalone console. The concept was initially planned as a new version of the Genesis, with an upgraded color palette and a lower cost than the Saturn, and limited 3D capabilities thanks to integration of ideas from the development of the Sega Virtua Processor chip. Miller suggested an alternative strategy, citing concerns with releasing a new console with no previous design specifications within six to nine months. At the suggestion from Miller and his team, Sega designed the 32X as a peripheral for the existing Genesis, expanding its power with two 32-bit SuperH-2 processors. The SH-2 had been developed in 1993 as a joint venture between Sega and Japanese electronics company Hitachi. At the end of the Consumer Electronics show, with the basic design of the 32X in place, Sega Enterprises invited Sega of America to assist in development of the new add-on.

Although the new unit was a stronger console than originally proposed, it was not compatible with Saturn games. Before the 32X could be launched, the release date of the Saturn was announced for November 1994 in Japan, coinciding with the 32X's target launch date in North America. Sega of America now was faced with trying to market the 32X with the Saturn's Japan release occurring simultaneously. Their answer was to call the 32X a "transitional device" between the Genesis and the Saturn. This was justified by Sega's statement that both platforms would run at the same time and that the 32X would be aimed at players who could not afford the more expensive Saturn.

The 32X was released in November 1994, in time for the holiday season. Demand among retailers was high, and Sega could not keep up orders for the system. More than 1,000,000 orders had been placed for 32X units, but Sega had only managed to ship 600,000 units by January 1995. Launching at about the same price as a Genesis console, the price of the 32X was less than half of what the Saturn's price would be at launch. Though positioning the console as an inexpensive entry into 32-bit gaming, Sega had a difficult time convincing third-party developers to create games for the new system. After an early run on the peripheral, news soon spread to the public of the upcoming release of the Sega Saturn, which would not support the 32X's games. The Saturn was released on May 11, 1995, four months earlier than its originally intended release date of September 2, 1995. The Saturn, in turn, caused developers to further shy away from the console and created doubt about the library for the 32X, even with Sega's assurances that there would be a large number of games developed for the system. In early 1996, Sega conceded that it had promised too much out of the 32X and decided to stop producing the system in order to focus on the Saturn. Prices for the 32X dropped to $99 and cleared out of stores at $19.95.

== Variations ==
More than a dozen licensed variations of the Genesis/Mega Drive have been released. In addition to models made by Sega, alternate models were made by other companies, such as Majesco, AtGames, JVC, Pioneer Corporation, Amstrad, and Aiwa. A number of bootleg clones were created during its lifespan.

=== First-party models ===
Genesis II	Genesis II	Genesis II
Mega Drive II (Japanese model)	Genesis II (NTSC model)	Mega Drive II (PAL/SECAM model)
Sega CDX	Genesis Nomad	TeraDrive
Genesis CDX	Genesis Nomad	TeraDrive

In 1993, Sega introduced a smaller, lighter version of the console, known as the Mega Drive II in Japan, Europe, and Australia (Note: Spelled as Mega Drive 2 (with an Arabic numeral) in Japan.) and sold as Genesis (without the Sega prefix) in North America. This version omits the headphone jack, replaces the A/V-Out connector with a smaller version that supports stereo sound, and provides a simpler, less expensive mainboard that requires less power.

Sega released a combined, semi-portable Genesis/Sega CD unit, the Genesis CDX (marketed as the Multi-Mega in Europe). This unit retailed at US$399.95; this was roughly US$100 more than the individual Genesis and Sega CD units put together, as the Sega CD had been reduced to US$229 half a year before. The CDX was bundled with Sonic CD, Sega Classics Arcade Collection, and the Sega CD version of Ecco the Dolphin. The CDX features a small LCD screen that, when the unit is used to play audio CDs, displays the current track being played. With this feature and the system's lightweight build (weighing two pounds), Sega marketed it in part as a portable CD player.

Late in the 16-bit era, Sega released a handheld version of the Genesis, the Genesis Nomad. Its design was based on the Mega Jet, a Mega Drive portable unit featured on airplane flights in Japan. As the only successor to the Game Gear, the Nomad operates on 6 AA batteries, displaying its graphics on a 3.25-inch (8.25-mm) LCD screen. The Nomad supports the entire Genesis library (save for one game that requires the use of the reset button, which the Nomad lacks), but cannot be used with the Sega 32X, the Sega CD, or the Power Base Converter.

Exclusive to the Japanese market was the TeraDrive, a Mega Drive combined with an IBM PC compatible computer. Sega also produced three arcade system boards based on the Mega Drive: the System C-2, the MegaTech, and the MegaPlay, which support approximately 80 games combined.

=== Third-party models ===
Wondermega	Wondermega 2	Amstrad Mega PC
Wondermega (JVC model)	Wondermega 2	Amstrad Mega PC
Majesco's Genesis 3	AtGames's Sega Firecore	Pioneer LaserActive
Genesis 3	Firecore	LaserActive

Working with Sega Enterprises, JVC released the Wondermega on April 1, 1992, in Japan. The system was later redesigned by JVC and released as the X'Eye in North America in September 1994. Designed by JVC to be a Genesis and Sega CD combination with high quality audio, the Wondermega's high price ($500 at launch) kept it out of the hands of average consumers. The same was true of the Pioneer LaserActive, which requires an add-on known as the Mega-LD pack, developed by Sega, in order to play Genesis and Sega CD games. Although the LaserActive was lined up to compete with the 3DO Interactive Multiplayer, the combined price of the system and the Mega-LD pack made it a prohibitively expensive option for Sega players. Aiwa released the CSD-GM1, a combination Genesis/Sega CD unit built into a boombox. Several companies added the Mega Drive to personal computers, mimicking the design of Sega's TeraDrive; these include the MSX models AX-330 and AX-990, distributed in Kuwait and Yemen, and the Amstrad Mega PC, distributed in Europe and Australia.

After the Genesis was discontinued, Majesco released the Genesis 3 as a budget version in 1998. This version is even smaller in comparison to earlier models, but it can only play standard cartridges as it omitted support for the Sega CD and the 32X. A similar thing happened in Portugal, where Ecofilmes, Sega's distributor in the country, obtained a license to sell the Mega Game II. This version was more akin to the second first-party model, being noteworthy the inclusion of six-button controllers and a switch to alternate between different game regions, enabling this version to play all games without the need for any device or modification to bypass region locking.

=== Re-releases and emulation ===
A number of Genesis and Mega Drive emulators have been produced, including GenEM, KGen, Genecyst, VGen, Gens, and Kega Fusion. The GameTap subscription gaming service included a Genesis emulator and had several dozen licensed Genesis games in its catalog. The Console Classix subscription gaming service includes an emulator and has several hundred Genesis games in its catalog.

Compilations of Genesis games have been released for other consoles. These include Sonic Mega Collection and Sonic Gems Collection for PS2, Xbox, and GameCube; Sega Genesis Collection for PS2 and PSP; and Sonic's Ultimate Genesis Collection (known as the Sega Mega Drive Ultimate Collection in PAL territories) for PlayStation 3 and Xbox 360.

During his keynote speech at the 2006 Game Developers Conference, Nintendo president Satoru Iwata announced that Sega would make a number of Genesis/Mega Drive games available to download on the Wii's Virtual Console. There are select Genesis games available on the Xbox 360 through Xbox Live Arcade, such as Sonic the Hedgehog and Sonic 2, as well as games available via the PlayStation Network and Steam.

Companies such as Radica Games have also released various compilations of Genesis and Mega Drive games in "plug-and-play" packages resembling the system's controller.

=== Later releases ===
On May 22, 2006, North American company Super Fighter Team released Beggar Prince, a game translated from a 1996 Chinese original. It was released worldwide and was the first commercial Genesis game release in North America since 1998. Super Fighter Team would later go on to release two more games for the system, Legend of Wukong and Star Odyssey. In December 2010, WaterMelon, an American company, released Pier Solar and the Great Architects, the first commercial role-playing video game specifically developed for the console since 1996, and was the biggest 16-bit game ever produced for the console at the time at 64 Mb (roughly 8 Megabytes). Pier Solar is the only cartridge-based game which can optionally use the Sega CD to play an enhanced soundtrack and sound effects disc. In 2013, independent programmer Future Driver, inspired by the Disney film Wreck-It Ralph, developed Fix-It Felix Jr. for the Genesis. In 2017, American company Mega Cat Games released Coffee Crisis, a Beat 'em up, for the Sega Genesis.

On December 5, 2007, Tectoy released a portable version of the Genesis/Mega Drive with twenty built-in games. Another version called "Mega Drive Guitar Idol" comes with two six-button joypads and a guitar controller with five fret buttons. The Guitar Idol game contains a mix of Brazilian and international songs. The console has 87 built-in games, including some from Electronic Arts based on the mobile phone versions. In 2016, Tectoy announced that they had developed a new Genesis console that not only looks almost identical to the original model of the Genesis, but also has a traditional cartridge slot and SD card reader, which was released in June 2017.

In 2009, Chinese company AtGames produced a Genesis/Mega Drive-compatible console, the Firecore. It features a top-loading cartridge slot and includes two controllers similar to the six-button controller for the original Genesis. The console has 15 games built-in and is region-free, allowing cartridge games to run regardless of their region. AtGames also produced a handheld version of the console preloaded with 20 games. Both machines have been released in Europe by distributing company Blaze Europe.

In 2018, Sega announced a dedicated console, the Genesis/Mega Drive Mini. The console includes 40 games, including Gunstar Heroes and Castlevania: Bloodlines, with different games for different regions and a save-anywhere function. Streets of Rage composer Yuzo Koshiro provided the menu music. The console was released worldwide on September 19, 2019.

Crowdfunded Sega Genesis games have been released in recent years, with Tanglewood, a puzzle platformer being released on August 14, 2018, and Xeno Crisis released on October 28, 2019. Both games were created by indie-game developers using actual Sega development hardware to ensure compatibility with the Genesis. On December 16, 2020, Paprium, WaterMelon's follow up game to Pier Solar, was released after nearly a decade in development.

On May 14, 2025 GIANTS Software released a recreation of their game Farming Simulator as a limited edition cartridge for the Genesis titled Farming Simulator 16 Bit Edition. The cartridge was included with Farming Simulator 25's Limited Edition and Deluxe Edition of the PC version.

== Reception ==
At the time of its release, the Genesis received positive reviews. Andy Storer of New Computer Express praised the console's responsive controls and graphics, and said the Genesis was "straight out of the future". Similarly, Electronic Gaming Monthly (EGM) in a 1989 preview of the console spoke highly of the system's hardware but questioned Sega's ability to support the console given their difficulties with the Master System. New Computer Express called the Genesis "the [console] to have" in 1990, rating it 5 out of 5 stars while predicting the console would lead the market. In the same year, EGM complimented how well the Genesis' games took advantage of the console's hardware, but expressed concern about the slow pace of new releases of games, with four reviewers scoring the console 9, 8, 8, and 10 out of 10.

Reviewing the Genesis in 1995, Game Players noted that its rivalry with the Super NES was skewed by genre, with the Genesis having superior sports games and the Super NES superior RPGs. Commenting that the Genesis hardware was aging and the new software drying up, they recommended consumers buy a next-generation system or a Genesis Nomad instead, but also advised those who already owned a Genesis to not sell it. In a 1997 year-end review, a team of five EGM editors gave the Genesis scores of 4.5, 5.0, 4.0, 4.5, and 7.5 – for all five editors, the lowest score they gave to any of the five consoles reviewed in the issue. While their chief criticisms were the lack of upcoming game releases and dated hardware, they also concurred that the Genesis was clearly inferior to the Super NES in terms of graphics capabilities, sound chip, and games library. John Ricciardi, in particular, considered the Genesis overrated, saying he had consistently found more enjoyment in both the Super NES and TurboGrafx-16, while Dan Hsu and Crispin Boyer recommended it based on its selection of classic titles and the high value-for-money of the six pack-in games Sega was offering at the time.

== Legacy ==
The Genesis has often ranked among the best video game consoles. In 2009, IGN named it the fifth best video game console, citing its edge in sports games and better home version of Mortal Kombat, and lauding "what some consider to be the greatest controller ever created: the six button". In 2007, GameTrailers named the Genesis as the sixth best console of all time in their list of top ten consoles that "left their mark on the history of gaming", noting its great games and solid controller, and writing of the "glory days" of Sonic the Hedgehog. In January 2008, technology columnist Don Reisinger proclaimed that the Genesis "created the industry's best console war to date", citing Sonic the Hedgehog, superior sports games, and backward compatibility with the Sega Master System. In 2008, GamingExcellence ranked it sixth on a list of the best consoles, declaring, "one can truly see the Genesis for the gaming milestone it was." At the same time, GameDaily rated it ninth of ten for its memorable games.

In 2014, USgamer's Jeremy Parish wrote, "If the Atari generation introduced video games as a short-lived '70s fad ... and the NES generation established it into an enduring obsession for the young, Sega's Genesis began pushing the medium toward something resembling its contemporary form", expounding that the system served as "the key incubator for modern sports franchises", made "consoles truly international" by providing Western third-parties previously put at a disadvantage by Nintendo's restrictive licensing policies with a more profitable alternative, created "an online subscription service" that foreshadowed "PlayStation Plus more than 15 years early" with the Sega Channel, and "played a key role in ensuring the vitality and future of the games industry by breaking Nintendo's near-monopolistic hold on the U.S. and awakening the U.K. to the merits of television gaming".

For his part, Kalinske highlighted Sega's role in developing games for an older demographic and pioneering "the concept of the 'street date'" with the simultaneous North American and European release of Sonic the Hedgehog 2. John Sczepaniak of Retro Gamer noted, "It was a system where the allure was born not only of the hardware and games, but the magazines, playground arguments, climate, and politics of the time." Sega of America's marketing campaign for the Genesis was widely emulated, influencing marketing in the subsequent generation of consoles.

== See also ==
- List of best-selling Sega Genesis games
- Neo Geo
- Philips CD-i
