= Tiertex Design Studios =

British video game development company

Tiertex Design Studios Limited
- Type: Private
- Industry: Video games
- Founded: 1987; 39 years ago
- Founders: Donald Campbell; John Prince
- Defunct: 5 August 2021
- Fate: Dissolved
- Headquarters: Macclesfield, England

Tiertex Design Studios Limited was a British software development company and former video game developer based in Macclesfield, England; it was founded in 1986, focusing on porting games to home computers and handheld platforms.

It developed over 200 titles, including many under licence from companies such as THQ, Disney Interactive and BBC Multimedia. In later years, it struggled with the move to the seventh generation of video game consoles so pivoted to developing USB development boards and displays for industrial purposes.

On 5 August 2021, the company closed its doors.

== Games developed and/or published ==
- 720° (ZX Spectrum, Commodore 64, Amstrad CPC, 1987)
- Rolling Thunder (ZX Spectrum, Commodore 64, Amstrad CPC, Amiga, Atari ST, 1987)
- 1943: The Battle of Midway (Commodore 64, ZX Spectrum, 1987-1988)
- Street Fighter (Amiga, ZX Spectrum, Atari ST, Commodore 64, Amstrad CPC, 1988)
- Thunder Blade (Amiga, Amstrad CPC, Atari ST, Commodore 64, MSX, ZX Spectrum, MS-DOS, 1988-1989)
- Last Duel (Amiga, Amstrad CPC, Atari ST, Commodore 64, ZX Spectrum, 1989)
- Human Killing Machine (Amiga, Amstrad CPC, Atari ST, Commodore 64, ZX Spectrum, MS-DOS, 1989)
- Indiana Jones and the Last Crusade: The Action Game (Amiga, Amstrad CPC, Atari ST, Master System, Sega Genesis, Game Gear, Commodore 64, ZX Spectrum, MSX, 1989)
- Strider (Amiga, Atari ST, Amstrad CPC, Commodore 64, ZX Spectrum, MS-DOS, 1989)
- Paperboy (Master System, Game Gear, 1990)
- Gauntlet (Master System, 1990)
- Days of Thunder (Commodore 64, ZX Spectrum, 1990)
- Dynasty Wars (Amiga, ZX Spectrum, Atari ST, Commodore 64, Amstrad CPC, 1990)
- Italy 1990 (Amiga, Amstrad CPC, Atari ST, Commodore 64, ZX Spectrum, MS-DOS, 1990)
- Strider II (Amiga, Atari ST, Amstrad CPC, Commodore 64, ZX Spectrum, 1990)
- U.N. Squadron (Amiga, Amstrad CPC, Atari ST, Commodore 64, ZX Spectrum, 1990)
- Ace of Aces (Master System, 1991)
- Alien Storm (Amiga, Atari ST, Amstrad CPC, Commodore 64, ZX Spectrum, 1991)
- Heroes of the Lance (Master System, 1991)
- Mercs (Amiga, Atari ST, Amstrad CPC, Commodore 64, ZX Spectrum, Master System, 1991)
- Strider (Master System, 1991)
- Bonanza Bros (Amiga, Atari ST, 1991)
- The Flintstones (Master System, 1991)
- Super Kick-Off (Sega Genesis, Master System, 1991)
- World Class Leaderboard Golf (Master System, Sega Genesis, Game Gear, 1991)
- Super Space Invaders (Game Gear, 1991)
- Sonic's Edusoft (Master System, unreleased)
- Die Hard 2: Die Harder (DOS, C64, Amiga, Atari ST, 1992)
- Desert Strike: Return to the Gulf (Game Gear, 1992)
- Turbo OutRun (Mega Drive, 1992)
- Flashback: The Quest for Identity (3DO Interactive Multiplayer, CD-i, Atari Jaguar, Super Nintendo Entertainment System, 1992-1995)
- Strider II/Journey from Darkness: Strider Returns (Sega Genesis, Master System, Game Gear, 1992)
- International Rugby Challenge (Mega Drive, 1993)
- James Pond 2 (Game Gear, Master System, 1993)
- Star Wars (Game Gear, Master System, 1993)
- Olympic Gold (Sega Genesis, Master System, Game Gear, 1992)
- Winter Olympics (Game Gear, Sega Genesis, Master System, Super Nintendo Entertainment System, 1994)
- World Cup USA '94 (Amiga, Game Boy, Sega CD, 1994)
- Madden NFL '95 (Game Gear, 1994)
- FIFA International Soccer (Game Gear, Master System, 1994)
- Madden NFL '96 (Game Gear, 1995)
- Supercross 3D (Atari Jaguar, 1995)
- Pocahontas (Game Boy, 1996)
- Toy Story (Game Boy, 1996)
- The Hunchback of Notre Dame (Game Boy, 1996)
- Olympic Summer Games (Game Boy, Sega Genesis, Super Nintendo Entertainment System, 1996)
- FIFA 97 (Game Boy, 1996)
- Madden NFL 97 (Game Boy, 1996)
- NBA Live 96 (Game Boy, 1996)
- Timon & Pumbaa's Jungle Games (Super Nintendo Entertainment System, 1997)
- Hercules (Game Boy, 1997)
- FIFA: Road to World Cup 98 (Game Boy, 1997)
- Brunswick World: Tournament of Champions (Super Nintendo Entertainment System, 1997)
- Madden NFL 98 (Sega Genesis, Super Nintendo Entertainment System, 1997)
- NBA Live 98 (Sega Genesis, Super Nintendo Entertainment System, 1997)
- World Cup 98 (Game Boy, 1998)
- Mulan (Game Boy, 1998)
- Small Soldiers (Game Boy, 1998)
- A Bug's Life (Game Boy Color, 1999)
- Madden NFL 2000 (Game Boy Color, 1999)
- Men in Black: The Series (Game Boy Color, 1999)
- Toy Story 2 (Game Boy Color, 1999)
- NHL 2000 (Game Boy Color, 1999)
- Bob the Builder: Fix It Fun! (Game Boy Color, 2000)
- Robot Wars: Metal Mayhem (Game Boy Color, 2000)
- F1 Championship Season 2000 (Game Boy Color, 2000)
- FIFA 2000: Major League Soccer (Game Boy Color, 2000)
- Rugrats: Totally Angelica (Game Boy Color, 2000)
- Noddy and the Birthday Party (Game Boy Color, 2000)
- Championship Motocross 2001 Featuring Ricky Carmichael (Game Boy Color, 2000)
- Stuart Little: The Journey Home (Game Boy Color, 2001)
- Rocket Power: Gettin' Air (Game Boy Color, 2001)
- Toy Story Racer (Game Boy Color, 2001)
- Tweenies: Doodles' Bones (Game Boy Color, 2001)
- MX 2002 featuring Ricky Carmichael (Game Boy Advance, 2001)
- Galidor: Defenders of the Outer Dimension (Game Boy Advance, 2002)
- Ace Lightning (Game Boy Advance, 2002, PlayStation 2, 2003)
- Football Mania (Game Boy Advance, 2002)
- Carrera Power Slide (Game Boy Advance, 2003)
