= Winter Olympics (1993 video game) =

1993 video game

- Developers: Abstract Images; Unexpected Development; Tiertex
- Publisher: U.S. Gold
- Platforms: Amiga, Genesis, Game Boy, Super NES, Game Gear, MS-DOS, Master System
- Release: Amiga: NA: 1993; Genesis: NA: December 1993; EU: 1994; MS-DOS: NA: 1993; EU: 1994; Game Boy: NA: January 1994; EU: 1994; SNES: NA: February 1994; EU: February 24, 1994; Game Gear: NA: 1994; EU: 1994; Master System: EU: 1993
- Genre: Sports
- Modes: Single-player, multiplayer

Winter Olympics, released in the United States as Winter Olympic Games, is the official video game of the XVII Olympic Winter Games in Lillehammer, Norway. All versions were published by U.S. Gold. It was released in North America in 1993 for the Amiga, Sega Genesis, and IBM PC compatibles. Ports to the Game Gear, Sega Genesis, Master System, and Super Nintendo Entertainment System followed. The game includes 10 winter sporting events. Players can represent countries from all over the world.

== Gameplay ==
The player can train freely and compete in either full or mini Olympics, the latter of which allows the player to choose events. Before the competition, the player can choose between the 16 teams, each representing one of the many participating nations at the 1994 Winter Olympics. Also during competition, there are both medals and points tables. While in Olympic Gold points were awarded according to the medals table, in Winter Olympics they were given according to the best results, as in decathlon. Doing so, it was perfectly possible for one to win the gold medal in short track and get few more points than other skaters (even non-finalists) that got better qualifying times. This scoring method also meant that one who won gold medals in six or seven events might fall outside the top 10 if disqualified on the remaining three.

=== Events ===
1. Downhill
2. Giant Slalom
3. Super G
4. Slalom
5. Bobsled
6. Luge
7. Freestyle moguls (console versions only)
8. Ski jumping
9. Biathlon
10. Short track

=== Playable nations ===
1. Australia
2. Austria
3. Brazil
4. Canada
5. Finland
6. France
7. Germany
8. Great Britain
9. Italy
10. Japan
11. Norway
12. Russia
13. Spain
14. Sweden
15. Switzerland
16. United States

== Development ==
Major differences between versions stemmed from U.S. Gold's choice to use two companies developing different versions of the game separately. Additionally, Tiertex wrote original code for each platform instead of porting. Amongst major differences, freestyle moguls are different on the 16-bit versions, and overall the Super NES version is much more unforgiving than the Genesis version, while the Master System version allows better control on alpine skiing events.
