= Olympic Gold =

Olympic Gold may refer to:

- Olympic medal, the highest class of which is gold
  - List of multiple Olympic gold medalists, athletes who have won multiple gold medals
- Gold Olympic Order, the highest grade of the Olympic Order
- Olympic Gold (video game), 1992 video game
- Olympic Gold Quest, an Indian not-for-profit company
