= Brunswick World: Tournament of Champions =

1997 video game

- Cover art
- Developer: Tiertex Design Studios
- Publisher: Black Pearl
- Composer: Mark Ortiz
- Platform: Super NES
- Release: NA: August 12, 1997
- Genre: Sports
- Modes: Single-player, multiplayer

Brunswick World: Tournament of Champions is a Super NES bowling video game that engages players in the life of an aspiring bowler who wants to make it to the top of the professional bowling world.

== Gameplay ==
Players gain points by knocking down as many pins as possible.

The player can play exhibition mode or league mode.

The player must choose the weight of the bowling ball. The lighter it is, the more force the player needs to make a strike. Players can either participate in a short tournament or a long tournament, which determines the number of bowlers that he plays against.

There are six tournaments to compete in: the Combat Zone Classic, The Quantum Open, The Las Vegas International, The Bayer Brunswick Tournament Players Championship, The Johnny Petraglia Open, and the Brunswick World Tournament of Champions. Two circular meters are used to determine the power and spin of the bowling ball. Rookies can opt to manually adjust the spin meter to their level of skill. Players have the option to play against Walter Ray Williams, Jr. along with several other professional bowlers.
