= Major League Soccer =

Professional soccer league in the United States and Canada

- Organising body: Major League Soccer, LLC
- Founded: December 17, 1993; 32 years ago
- First season: 1996
- Countries: United States (27 teams); Canada (3 teams)
- Confederation: CONCACAF
- Commissioner: Don Garber
- Conferences: Eastern Conference; Western Conference
- Number of clubs: 30
- Level on pyramid: 1
- Domestic cup(s): U.S. Open Cup; Canadian Championship
- International cup(s): CONCACAF Champions Cup; Campeones Cup; Leagues Cup
- Current MLS Cup: Inter Miami CF (1st title) (2025)
- Current Supporters' Shields: Nashville SC (1st shield) (2026)
- Most MLS Cups: LA Galaxy (6 titles)
- Most Supporters' Shields: D.C. United; LA Galaxy (4 shields each)
- Most appearances: Nick Rimando (514)
- Top scorer: Chris Wondolowski (171)
- Broadcasters: Apple TV: United States: Fox/FS1; Fox Deportes (Note: Spanish audio/broadcast); Canada: TSN; RDS (Note: French audio/broadcast); International: See list
- Website: mlssoccer.com
- Current: 2026 Major League Soccer season

Major League Soccer (MLS) is a professional soccer league in North America and the highest level of the United States soccer league system. It comprises 30 teams, with 27 in the United States and 3 in Canada, and is sanctioned by the United States Soccer Federation. MLS is one of the major professional sports leagues in the United States and Canada. The league is headquartered in New York City.

The predecessor of MLS was the North American Soccer League (NASL), which existed from 1968 until 1984. MLS was founded in 1993 as part of the United States' successful bid to host the 1994 FIFA World Cup. The inaugural season took place in 1996 with ten teams. MLS experienced financial and operational struggles in its first few years, losing millions of dollars and folding two teams in 2002. Since then, developments such as the proliferation of soccer-specific stadiums around the league, the implementation of the Designated Player Rule allowing teams to sign star players such as David Beckham and Lionel Messi, and national TV contracts have made MLS profitable.

In 2024, with an average attendance of over 23,200 per match, MLS had the third-highest average attendance of the major professional sports leagues in the United States and Canada, behind the National Football League (NFL) with over 69,000 fans per game and Major League Baseball (MLB) with over 26,000 fans per game.

The MLS regular season typically starts in late February and runs through mid-October, with each team playing 34 matches; the team with the best record is awarded the Supporters' Shield. Eighteen teams compete in the postseason MLS Cup playoffs in late October and November, culminating in the league's championship match, the MLS Cup. Instead of operating as an association of independently owned clubs, MLS is a single entity in which each team is owned by the league and individually operated by the league's investors. The league has a fixed membership like most sports leagues in the United States and Canada and Mexico's Liga MX, making it one of the few soccer leagues that does not use a promotion and relegation process.

The LA Galaxy have the most MLS Cups, with six. They are tied with D.C. United for most Supporters' Shields, with four each. Nashville SC are the current Supporters' Shield holders, having won their first title in 2026, while the current MLS Cup champion is Inter Miami CF, winning their first title in 2025. Chris Wondolowski holds the all-time goalscoring record in MLS with 171 goals scored between 2005 and 2021.

== History ==
Major League Soccer is the most recent of a series of men's premier professional national soccer leagues established in the United States and Canada. The predecessor of MLS was the North American Soccer League (NASL), which existed from 1968 until 1984. The United States did not have a truly national top-flight league with FIFA-sanctioning until the creation of the NASL. The first league to have U.S. and Canadian professional clubs, the NASL struggled until the mid-1970s when the New York Cosmos, the league's most prominent team, signed a number of the world's best players including Pelé and Franz Beckenbauer. Pelé's arrival attracted other well-known international stars to the league including Johan Cruyff, Gerd Müller, Eusébio, Bobby Moore, and George Best. Despite dramatic increases in attendance (with some matches drawing over 70,000 fans such as Soccer Bowl '78, the highest attendance to date for any club soccer championship in the United States), factors such as over-expansion, the economic recession of the early 1980s, and disputes with the players union ultimately led to the collapse of the NASL following the 1984 season, leaving the United States without a top-level soccer league until MLS.

=== Establishment and shootout era ===
In 1988, in exchange for FIFA awarding the right to host the 1994 World Cup, U.S. Soccer promised to establish a Division 1 professional soccer league. In 1993, U.S. Soccer selected Major League Professional Soccer (the precursor to MLS) as the exclusive Division 1 professional soccer league. Major League Soccer was officially formed in February 1995 as a limited liability company.

Tab Ramos was the first player signed by MLS, on January 3, 1995, and was assigned to the New York/New Jersey MetroStars. MLS began play in 1996 with ten teams. The first match was held on April 6, 1996, as the San Jose Clash defeated D.C. United in front of 31,000 fans at Spartan Stadium in San Jose in a match broadcast on ESPN. The league had generated some buzz by managing to lure some marquee players from the 1994 World Cup to play in MLS—including U.S. stars such as Alexi Lalas, Tony Meola and Eric Wynalda, and foreign players such as Mexico's Jorge Campos and Colombia's Carlos Valderrama. D.C. United won the MLS Cup in three of the league's first four seasons. The league added its first two expansion teams in 1998—the Miami Fusion and the Chicago Fire; the Chicago Fire won its first title in its inaugural season.

After its first season, MLS suffered from a decline in attendance. The league's low attendance was all the more apparent in light of the fact that eight of the original ten teams played in large American football stadiums. One aspect that had alienated fans was that MLS experimented with rules deviations in its early years in an attempt to "Americanize" the sport. The league implemented the use of shootouts to resolve draws. MLS also used a countdown clock and halves ended when the clock reached 0:00. The league realized that the rule changes had alienated some traditional soccer fans while failing to draw new American sports fans, and the shootout and countdown clock were eliminated after the 1999 season. The league's quality was cast into doubt when the U.S. men's national team, which was made up largely of MLS players, finished in last place out of the 32 teams at the 1998 World Cup.

The league lost an estimated $250 million during its first five years, and more than $350 million between its founding and 2004. The league's financial problems led to Commissioner Doug Logan being replaced by Don Garber, a former NFL executive, in August 1999. Following decreased attendance and increased losses by late 2001, league officials planned to fold but were able to secure new financing from owners Lamar Hunt, Philip Anschutz, and the Kraft family to take on more teams. MLS announced in January 2002 that it had decided to contract the Tampa Bay Mutiny and Miami Fusion, leaving the league with ten teams.

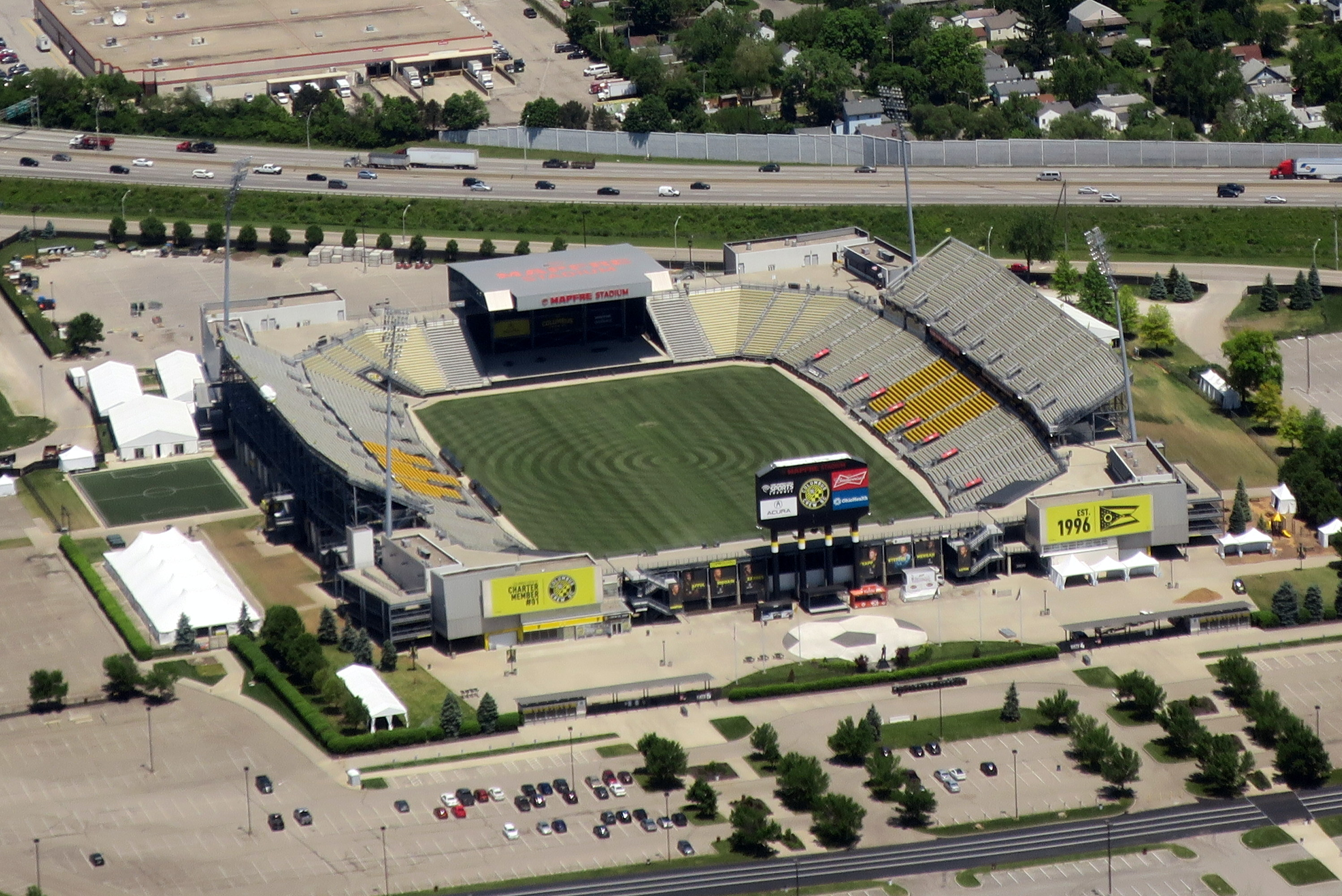
Built in 1999, Historic Crew Stadium (the home of the Columbus Crew until 2021) was the first soccer-specific stadium in MLS.

Despite the financial problems, though, MLS did have some accomplishments that would set the stage for its resurgence. Columbus Crew Stadium, now known as Historic Crew Stadium, was built in 1999, becoming MLS' first soccer-specific stadium. This began a trend among MLS teams to construct their own venues instead of leasing American football stadiums, where they would not be able to generate revenue from other events. In 2000, the league won an antitrust lawsuit, Fraser v. Major League Soccer, that the players had filed in 1996. The court ruled that MLS' policy of centrally contracting players and limiting player salaries through a salary cap and other restrictions were a legal method for the league to maintain solvency and competitive parity since MLS was a single entity and therefore incapable of conspiring with itself.

=== Resurgence ===
The 2002 FIFA World Cup, in which the United States made the quarterfinals, coincided with a resurgence in American soccer and MLS, with MLS Cup 2002 drawing 61,316 spectators to Gillette Stadium, the largest attendance in an MLS Cup final until 2018. MLS limited teams to three substitutions per game in 2003, and adopted International Football Association Board (IFAB) rules in 2005.

MLS underwent a transition in the years leading up to the 2006 World Cup. After marketing itself on the talents of American players, the league lost some of its homegrown stars to prominent European leagues. For example, Tim Howard was transferred to Manchester United for $4 million in one of the most lucrative contract deals in league history. Many more American players did make an impact in MLS. In 2005, Jason Kreis became the first player to score 100 career MLS goals.

The league's financial stabilization plan included teams moving out of large American football stadiums and into soccer-specific stadiums. From 2003 to 2008, the league oversaw the construction of six additional soccer-specific stadiums, largely funded by owners such as Lamar Hunt and Phil Anschutz, so that by the end of 2008, a majority of teams were now in soccer-specific stadiums.

It was also in this era that MLS expanded for the first time since 1998. Real Salt Lake and Chivas USA began play in 2005, with Chivas USA becoming the second club in Los Angeles. By 2006 the San Jose Earthquakes owners, players and a few coaches moved to Texas to become the expansion Houston Dynamo, after failing to build a stadium in San Jose. The Dynamo became an expansion team, leaving their history behind for a new San Jose ownership group that formed in 2007.

=== Arrival of Designated Players ===
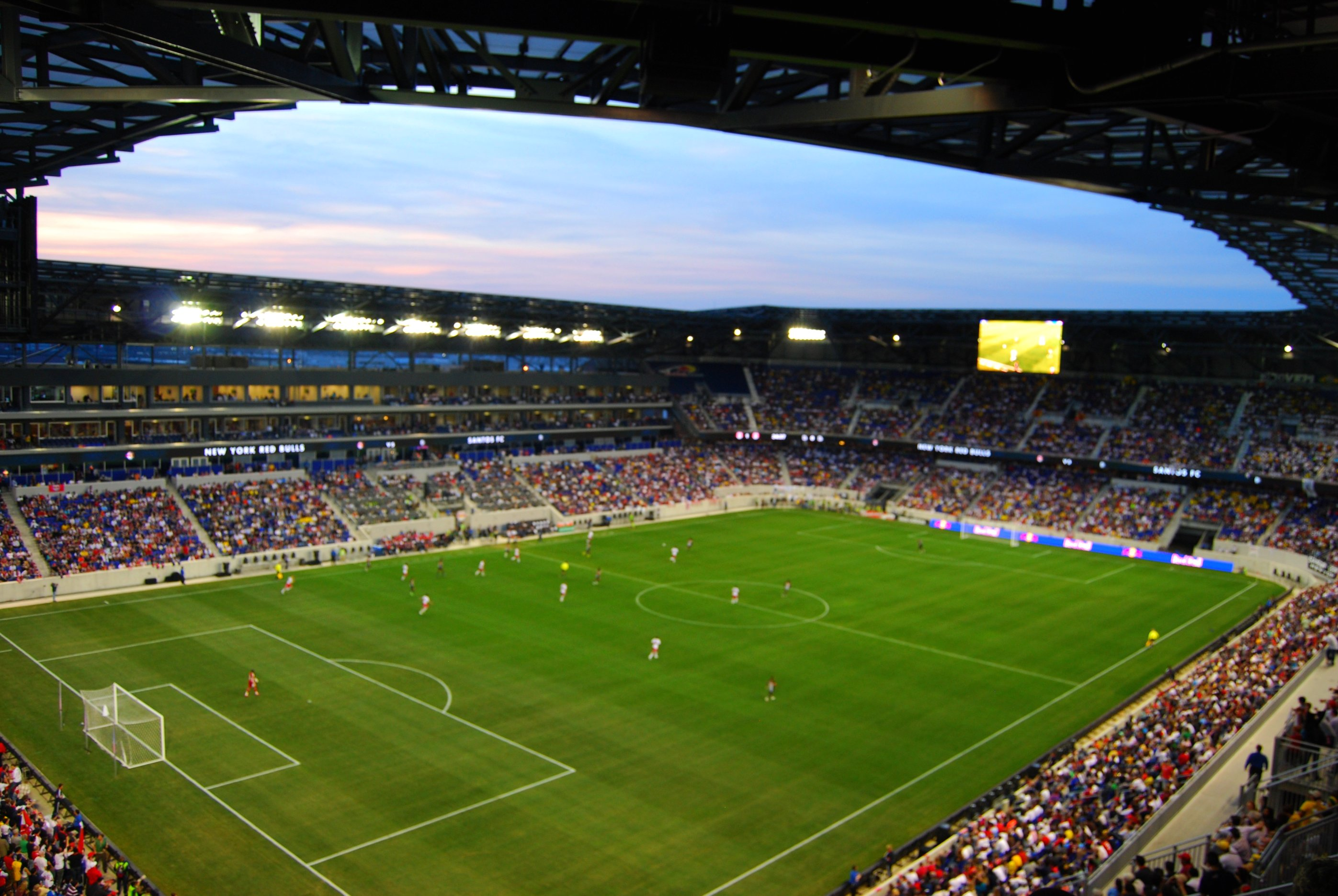
The 2010 season also brought the opening of the New York Red Bulls' soccer-specific stadium, Red Bull Arena.

In 2007, the league expanded beyond the United States' borders into Canada with the Toronto FC expansion team. Major League Soccer took steps to further raise the level of play by adopting the Designated Player Rule, which helped bring international stars into the league. The 2007 season witnessed the MLS debut of David Beckham. Beckham's signing had been seen as a coup for American soccer, and was made possible by the Designated Player Rule. Players such as Cuauhtémoc Blanco (Chicago Fire) and Juan Pablo Ángel (New York Red Bulls), are some of the first Designated Players who made major contributions to their clubs. The departures of Clint Dempsey and Jozy Altidore, coupled with the return of former U.S. national team stars Claudio Reyna and Brian McBride, highlighted the exchange of top prospects to Europe for experienced veterans to MLS.

By 2008, San Jose had returned to the league under new ownership, and in 2009, the expansion side Seattle Sounders FC began play in MLS as the successor to a lower league team. The Sounders set a new average attendance record for the league, with 30,943 spectators per match, and were the first expansion team to qualify for the playoffs since 1998. The 2010 season ushered in an expansion franchise in the Philadelphia Union and their new PPL Park stadium (now known as Subaru Park). The 2010 season also brought the opening of the New York Red Bulls' soccer-specific stadium, Red Bull Arena, and the debut of French striker Thierry Henry.

The 2011 season brought further expansion with the addition of the Vancouver Whitecaps FC, the second Canadian MLS franchise, and the Portland Timbers, both of which were previously lower league franchises. Real Salt Lake reached the finals of the 2010–11 CONCACAF Champions League. During the 2011 season, the Galaxy signed another international star in Republic of Ireland all-time leading goalscorer Robbie Keane. MLS drew an average attendance of 17,872 in 2011, higher than the average attendances of the National Basketball Association (NBA) and National Hockey League (NHL). In 2012, the Montreal Impact became the league's 19th franchise and the third in Canada, and made their home debut in front of a crowd of 58,912, while the New York Red Bulls added Australian all-time leading goalscorer Tim Cahill.

=== Expansion of the league ===
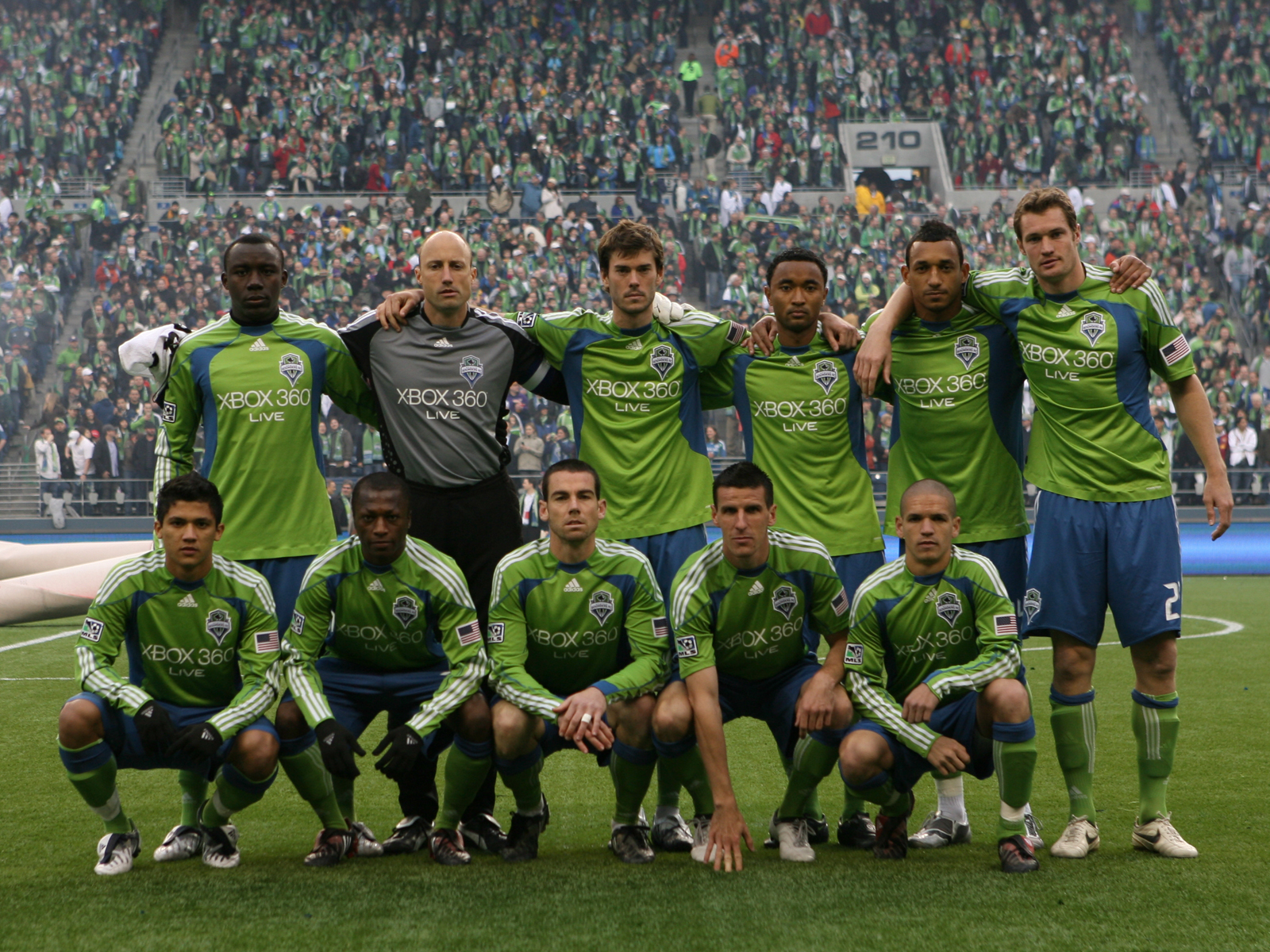
Seattle Sounders FC (2009)

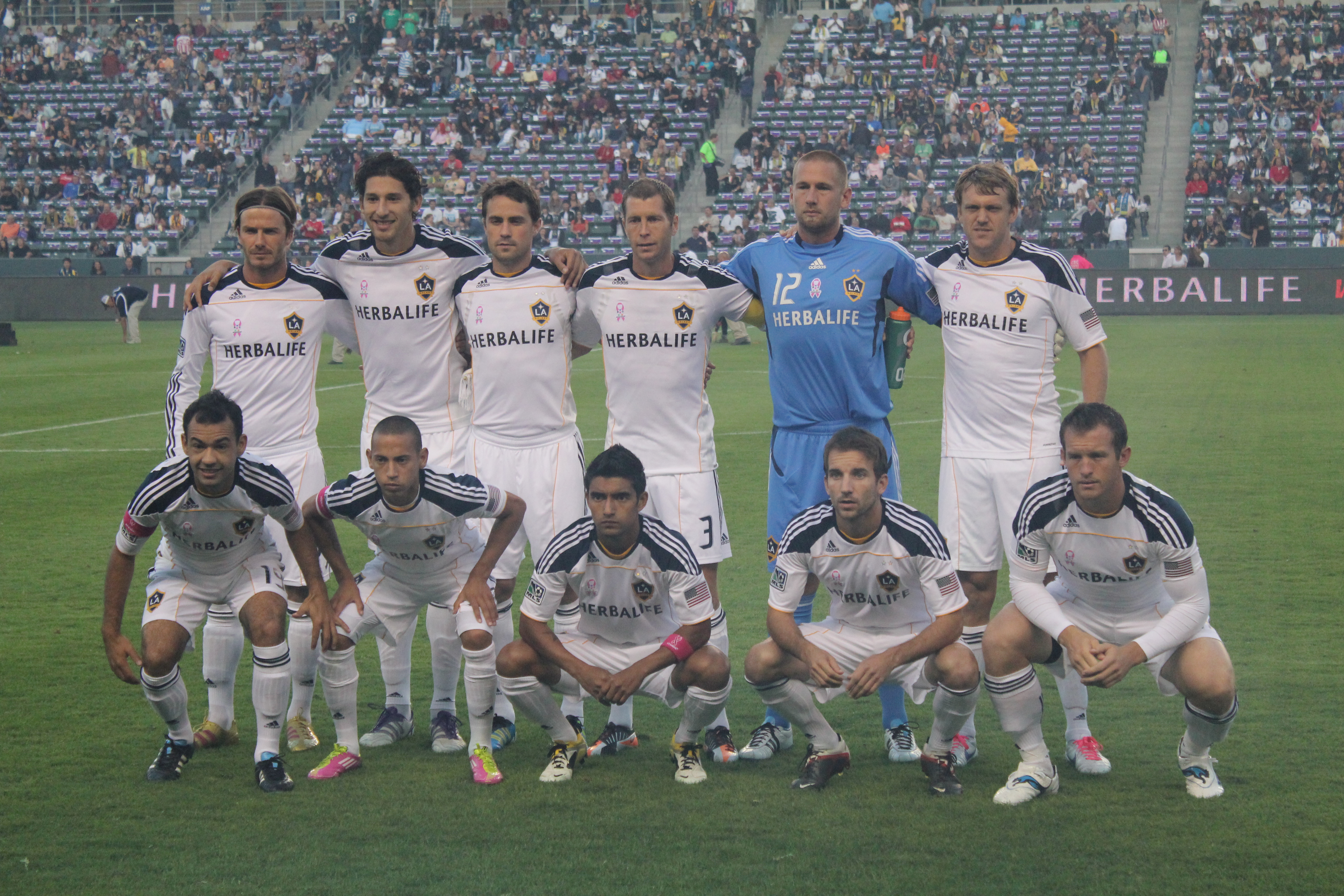
LA Galaxy (2011)

In 2012, with an average attendance of over 18,000 per game, MLS had the third highest average attendance of any sports league in the U.S. after the NFL and MLB, and was the seventh highest attended professional soccer league worldwide as of 2013.

In 2013, MLS introduced New York City FC as its 20th team, and Orlando City Soccer Club as its 21st team, both of which would begin playing in 2015.

In 2013, the league implemented its "Core Players" initiative, allowing teams to retain key players using retention funds instead of losing the players to foreign leagues. Among the first high-profile players re-signed in 2013 using retention funds were U.S. national team regulars Graham Zusi and Matt Besler. Beginning in summer of 2013 and continuing in the run up to the 2014 World Cup, MLS began signing U.S. stars based abroad, including Clint Dempsey, Jermaine Jones, and Michael Bradley from Europe; and DaMarcus Beasley from Mexico's Liga MX. By the 2014 season, 15 of the 19 MLS head coaches had previously played in MLS. By 2013, the league's popularity had increased to the point where MLS was as popular as MLB among 12- to 17-year-olds, as reported by the 2013 Luker on Trends ESPN poll, having jumped in popularity since the 2010 World Cup.

In 2014, the league announced Atlanta United FC as the 22nd team to start playing in 2017. Even though New York City FC and Orlando City were not set to begin play until 2015, each team made headlines during the summer 2014 transfer window by announcing their first Designated Players—Spain's leading scorer David Villa and Chelsea's leading scorer Frank Lampard to New York, and Ballon d'Or winner Kaká to Orlando. The 2014 World Cup featured 21 MLS players on World Cup rosters and a record 11 MLS players playing for foreign teams—including players from traditional powerhouses Brazil (Júlio César) and Spain (David Villa); in the U.S. v. Germany match the U.S. fielded a team with seven MLS starters.

On September 18, 2014, MLS unveiled their new logo as part of a branding initiative. In addition to the new crest logo, MLS teams display versions in their own colors on their jerseys. Chivas USA folded following the 2014 season, while New York City FC and Orlando City SC joined the league in 2015. Sporting Kansas City and the Houston Dynamo moved from the Eastern Conference to the Western Conference in 2015 to make two 10-team conferences.

In early 2015, the league announced that two teams—Los Angeles FC and Minnesota United FC—would join MLS in either 2017 or 2018. The 20th season of MLS saw the arrivals of several players who have starred at the highest levels of European club soccer and in international soccer: Giovanni dos Santos, Kaká, Andrea Pirlo, Frank Lampard, Steven Gerrard, Didier Drogba, David Villa, and Sebastian Giovinco. MLS confirmed in August 2016 that Minnesota United would begin play in 2017 along with Atlanta United FC.

In April 2016, the league's commissioner Don Garber reiterated the intention of the league to expand to 28 teams, with the next round of expansion "likely happening in 2020". In December 2016, he updated the expansion plans stating that the league will look to approve the 25th and 26th teams in 2017 and to start play in 2020. In January 2017, the league received bids from 12 ownership groups.

In July 2017, it was reported that Major League Soccer had rejected an offer by MP & Silva to acquire all television rights to the league following the conclusion of its current contracts with Fox, ESPN, and Univision, where MP & Silva insisted that the deal would be conditional on Major League Soccer adopting a promotion and relegation system. The league stated that it rejected the offer due to the exclusive periods that the current rightsholders have to negotiate extensions to their contracts. Additionally, media noted that Major League Soccer has long-opposed the adoption of promotion and relegation, continuing to utilize the fixed, franchise-based model used in other U.S. sports leagues. Furthermore, MP & Silva founder Riccardo Silva also owned Miami FC of the NASL, which stood to benefit from such a promotion and relegation system.

In October 2017, Columbus Crew owner Anthony Precourt announced plans to move the franchise to Austin, Texas by 2019. The announcement spawned a league-wide backlash and legal action against the league by the Ohio state government. On August 15, 2018, the Austin City Council voted to approve an agreement with Precourt to move Crew SC to Austin, and on August 22, 2018, the club's new name, Austin FC, was announced. After negotiations between Precourt and Jimmy Haslam, owner of the Cleveland Browns, were announced, MLS made it clear that Austin would receive an expansion team only after a deal to sell Columbus to a local buyer had completed. The purchase of Crew SC by Haslam's group was finalized in late December 2018, and on January 15, 2019, Austin FC was officially announced as a 2021 MLS entry.

MLS announced on December 20, 2017, that it would be awarding an expansion franchise to Nashville, Tennessee, to play in a yet-to-be-built 27,000-seat soccer-specific stadium, Nashville Fairgrounds Stadium, and would join MLS in 2020. The management of the Nashville franchise announced in February 2019 that the MLS side would assume the Nashville SC name then in use by the city's USL Championship team.

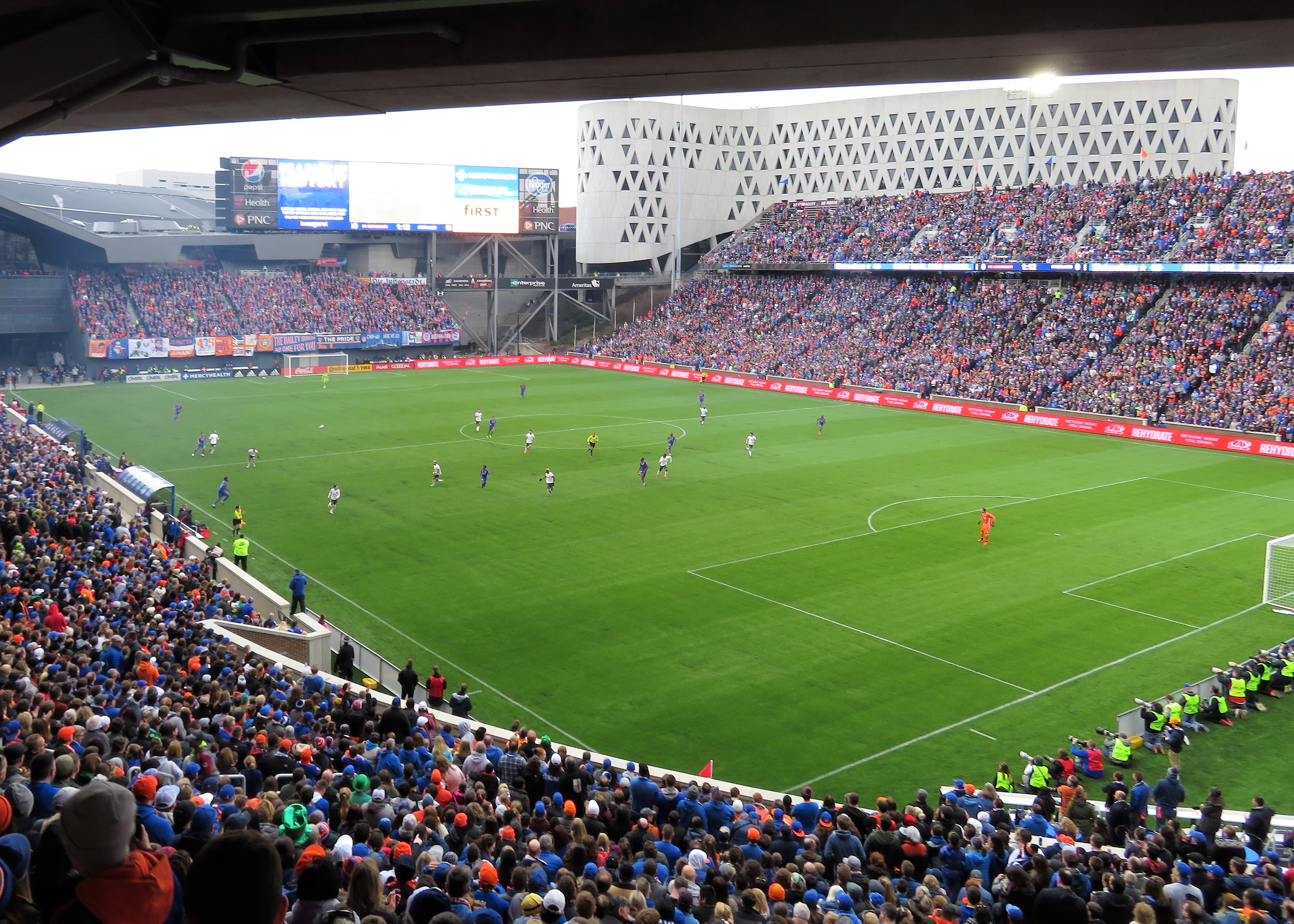
FC Cincinnati's inaugural MLS home match drew a 32,250 sellout crowd.

On January 29, 2018, MLS awarded Miami an expansion team, led by David Beckham. Inter Miami CF started MLS play on March 1, 2020, and plan on opening the proposed 25,000-seat stadium sometime in the near future. An expansion team was awarded to Cincinnati, Ohio on May 29, 2018, to the ownership group of USL's FC Cincinnati. The team, which assumed the existing FC Cincinnati name, started MLS play in 2019 and moved to the new 26,000-seat TQL Stadium in 2021.

The league planned to expand to 30 teams with the addition of Austin FC in 2021, Charlotte in 2022, and Sacramento and St. Louis in 2023; however, this was reduced to 29 after Sacramento Republic FC's bid was placed on indefinite hold. Commissioner Don Garber has suggested that another round of expansion could lead to 32 teams in MLS.

The league suspended its 2020 season on March 12, 2020, after two weeks, due to the COVID-19 pandemic in the United States, and other U.S.-based sports leagues did the same. The 2020 season resumed in July with the MLS is Back Tournament, a competition in which 24 out of the 26 teams competed at the ESPN Wide World of Sports Complex in Orlando for a spot in the CONCACAF Champions League. In September 2020, the league announced the formation of MLS Next, an academy league for MLS academy teams from the under-13 to under-19 level.

In 2022, the league signed a $2.5 billion, 10-year deal with Apple Inc. that made Apple TV the primary broadcaster for all MLS matches beginning in 2023. The agreement also included MLS and Leagues Cup matches shared across the streaming service. Subscriptions were provided for free for season ticket holders of clubs and certain matches were made free to all users. The schedule was adjusted as a result of the deal, with start times generally at 7:30 p.m. local time on Wednesdays and Saturdays rather than staggered across the matchday.

In May 2023, the league announced it would expand to 30 teams with the addition of San Diego FC for the 2025 season. The 2024 season broke attendance records, with an average of 23,240 per match and over 11 million total spectators. The presence of Lionel Messi and other star players was credited with contributing to the record crowds, which included several matches moved to larger venues.

In May 2026, MLS relocated its global headquarters to expanded facilities at 2 Penn Plaza in Midtown Manhattan.

==== Expansion fees ====
In 2005, Toronto FC's ownership paid $10 million (about $16 million in 2024) to join the league in 2007; San Jose paid $20 million the next year, and the fee had risen to $30 million when Sounders FC paid the fee in 2007 to join the league in 2009. In 2013, New York City FC agreed to pay a record $100 million expansion fee for the right to join MLS in 2015. This record was surpassed by the ownership groups of FC Cincinnati and Nashville SC, which each paid $150 million to join MLS 2019 and 2020, respectively. Despite being announced in January 2018, Inter Miami CF only paid a $25 million expansion fee due to a clause in part-owner David Beckham's original playing contract signed in 2007. $150 million was paid as an effective entrance fee by a group that bought Columbus Crew in 2018, which led to that team's previous operator receiving rights to Austin FC, which joined MLS in 2021. In 2019, Charlotte FC agreed to a reported $325 million expansion fee. The most recent expansion team, San Diego FC paid a record $500 million fee in 2023.

== Competition format ==
The MLS regular season runs from late February to October. Teams are geographically divided into the Eastern and Western Conferences, playing 34 matches in an unbalanced schedule. With 30 teams in 2025, each team plays two matches (home and away) against the other teams within their conference, and six matches against teams from the opposite conference. The 2020 season was the first season in league history in which teams did not play against every other team in the league. At the end of the regular season, the team with the highest point total is awarded the Supporters' Shield and home-field advantage throughout the playoffs.

Teams break for the annual All-Star Game midway through the season, an exhibition match containing the league's best players. The format of the All-Star Game has changed several times since the league's inception; 2020 was the first year in which the MLS All-Stars were planned to play against an all-star team from Mexico's Liga MX, before the event's cancellation due to the COVID-19 pandemic. Since 2015, the final matchday of the season has been branded as "Decision Day" and has almost all matches played between intra-conference teams kicking off simultaneously during two windows—one for each conference.

Unlike most major soccer leagues around the world, but similar to other leagues in the Americas, the MLS regular season is followed by a postseason knockout tournament to determine the league champion. As of 2023, eighteen teams participate in the MLS Cup playoffs in October and November, which concludes with the MLS Cup championship match in early December. The playoff format includes a pair of single-elimination play-in matches for the two lowest-ranked teams in each conference ahead of a best-of-three round; the round is followed by more single-elimination rounds that lead up to the MLS Cup final.

The MLS spring-to-fall schedule results in scheduling conflicts with the FIFA calendar and with summertime international tournaments such as the World Cup and the Gold Cup, causing some players to miss league matches. The schedule also causes issues with transfer windows; some players may be reluctant to sign with an MLS team during the North American midseason window while waiting for more lucrative options to appear during the European offseason, the scheduling of the window limits the number of matches new signings are able to appear in, and MLS teams can lose players in the middle of the season to European transfers, with few options to replace them. The MLS Cup playoffs compete for popularity and media presence with the MLB postseason, the heart of the regular season in American football (including college football and the NFL), as well as the start of the NBA and NHL regular seasons.

On November 13, 2025, MLS announced that it will transition to a summer-to-spring schedule closer to European leagues beginning in 2027. The regular season will begin in mid-July, a winter break will take place from mid-December to early or mid-February, and the MLS Cup playoffs will occur in May. MLS stated that moving to this schedule would improve the league's competitiveness, transfer opportunities, and allow the playoffs to have more prominence and be held in warmer weather. Under the new schedule, the MLS Cup playoffs would now compete primarily with the NBA and NHL playoffs, but will still fall within a less-crowded period of North America's professional sports calendar. As part of the transition process, the league will play an abbreviated 14-match regular season in early 2027, followed by the 2027–28 season in July. In addition, MLS will replace its conference-based format with a single table divided into five regional divisions: each team will play home and away matches against each of its divisional opponents, and one match against each team in the other four divisions.

=== Other competitions ===
MLS teams also play in other international and domestic competitions. Each season, up to ten MLS teams play in the CONCACAF Champions Cup (CCC) against other clubs from the CONCACAF region. Four MLS teams qualify based on regular-season results from the previous year: the Supporters' Shield champion, the team with the highest point total from the opposite conference, and the next two clubs in the Supporters' Shield rankings. The fifth MLS team to qualify is the reigning MLS Cup champion. An additional U.S.-based MLS team can qualify by winning the U.S. Open Cup. Starting in 2024, the league will send eight teams to participate in the U.S. Open Cup instead of every U.S.-based club, with MLS Next Pro teams as representatives for some teams. MLS had announced their intention to remove itself from the tournament entirely, but reached a compromise with U.S. Soccer to send representatives from clubs that were not participating in the Champions Cup, with the exception of the defending Open Cup champions. The last three teams to qualify are the champion, runner-up, and third-place finisher of the Leagues Cup. Montreal, Toronto, and Vancouver compete against other Canadian sides in the Canadian Championship for the one CONCACAF Champions Cup berth allocated to Canada. All three Canadian clubs may also qualify through MLS or the Leagues Cup. If a team qualifies through multiple berths, or they are taken by a Canadian MLS team, the berth is reallocated to the next best team in the overall table. If the U.S. Open Cup winner qualifies through multiple methods, the runner-up fills the slot; should the runner-up qualify, the next best team in the overall table earns the slot. If the Leagues Cup champion wins the MLS Cup, the MLS Cup runner-up qualifies to the round of 16; should a Leagues Cup slot already qualify, MLS is awarded with one additional slot given to the next best non-qualified team in the overall table. Seattle Sounders FC became the first MLS team to win the CONCACAF Champions Cup under the competition's updated format in 2022.

Since 2018, the reigning MLS Cup champion plays in the Campeones Cup, a Super Cup-style single match against the Campeón de Campeones from Liga MX, hosted by the MLS team in September. The inaugural edition saw Tigres UANL defeat Toronto FC at BMO Field in Toronto in 2018.

Another inter-league competition with Liga MX, the Leagues Cup, was established in 2019. The 2020 edition of the tournament was originally planned to pair eight MLS clubs against eight Liga MX clubs in a single-elimination tournament hosted in the United States, reviving an inter-league rivalry that previously took place in the now-defunct North American Superliga, before its cancellation. Beginning with the 2023 edition all MLS and Liga MX teams participated in the competition, which functions as the regional cup for the North American zone of CONCACAF. As of the 2025 edition, only 18 MLS clubs take part.

== Clubs ==
The league's 30 clubs are divided between the Eastern and Western conferences. MLS has regularly expanded since the 2005 season, most recently with the addition of San Diego FC in 2025.

The league features numerous rivalry cups that are contested by two or more teams, quite often geographic rivals. Each trophy is awarded to the team with the best record in matches during the regular season involving the participating teams. The concept is comparable to rivalry trophies played for by American college football teams.

MLS features some of the longest travel distances for a domestic soccer league, with Vancouver Whitecaps FC and Inter Miami CF the furthest apart teams at 2,801 miles (4,508 km). During the 2018 season, the team with the shortest distance traveled over the entire regular season schedule was Toronto FC at 25,891 miles (41,668 km), while the longest was Vancouver at 51,178 miles (82,363 km).

Overview of MLS clubs
Conference	Club	Location	Stadium	Capacity	Joined	Head coach
Eastern	Atlanta United FC	Atlanta, Georgia	Mercedes-Benz Stadium (Note: Not a soccer-specific stadium)	42,500 (Note: Standard reduced capacity for soccer; can be increased)	2017	Gerardo Martino
Eastern	Charlotte FC	Charlotte, North Carolina	Bank of America Stadium	38,000	2022	Dean Smith
Eastern	Chicago Fire FC	Chicago, Illinois	Soldier Field (Note: Chicago Fire plans to move within Chicago to McDonald's Park (capacity 22,000) at The 78 in 2028.)	24,995	1998	Gregg Berhalter
Eastern	FC Cincinnati	Cincinnati, Ohio	TQL Stadium	26,000	2019	Pat Noonan
Eastern	Columbus Crew	Columbus, Ohio	ScottsMiracle-Gro Field	20,000	1996	Laurent Courtois (interim)
Eastern	D.C. United	Washington, D.C.	Audi Field	20,000	1996	René Weiler
Eastern	Inter Miami CF	Miami, Florida	Nu Stadium	26,700	2020	Kily González
Eastern	CF Montréal	Montreal, Quebec	Saputo Stadium	19,619	2012	Philippe Eullaffroy (interim)
Eastern	Nashville SC	Nashville, Tennessee	Geodis Park	30,000	2020	B. J. Callaghan
Eastern	New England Revolution	Foxborough, Massachusetts	Gillette Stadium	20,000	1996	Marko Mitrović
Eastern	New York City FC	Bronx, New York	Yankee Stadium (Note: NYCFC plans to move to Etihad Park (capacity 27,000) in the New York City borough of Queens in 2027.)	30,321	2015	Pascal Jansen
Eastern	New York Red Bulls	Harrison, New Jersey	Sports Illustrated Stadium	25,000	1996	Michael Bradley
Eastern	Orlando City SC	Orlando, Florida	Inter.co Stadium	25,500	2015	Martín Perelman (interim)
Eastern	Philadelphia Union	Chester, Pennsylvania	Subaru Park	18,500	2010	Ryan Richter (interim)
Eastern	Toronto FC	Toronto, Ontario	BMO Field	28,351	2007	Robin Fraser
Western	Austin FC	Austin, Texas	Q2 Stadium	20,500	2021	Davy Arnaud (interim)
Western	Colorado Rapids	Commerce City, Colorado	Dick's Sporting Goods Park	18,061	1996	Matt Wells
Western	FC Dallas	Frisco, Texas	Toyota Stadium	19,096	1996	Eric Quill
Western	Houston Dynamo FC	Houston, Texas	Shell Energy Stadium	22,039	2006	Ben Olsen
Western	Sporting Kansas City	Kansas City, Kansas	Sporting Park	18,467	1996	Raphaël Wicky
Western	LA Galaxy	Carson, California	Dignity Health Sports Park	27,000	1996	Greg Vanney
Western	Los Angeles FC	Los Angeles, California	BMO Stadium	22,000	2018	Xavi Tamarit (interim)
Western	Minnesota United FC	Saint Paul, Minnesota	Allianz Field	19,400	2017	Cameron Knowles
Western	Portland Timbers	Portland, Oregon	Providence Park	25,218	2011	Martí Cifuentes
Western	Real Salt Lake	Sandy, Utah	America First Field	20,213	2005	Pablo Mastroeni
Western	San Diego FC	San Diego, California	Snapdragon Stadium	35,000	2025	Mikey Varas
Western	San Jose Earthquakes	San Jose, California	PayPal Park	18,000	1996	Bruce Arena
Western	Seattle Sounders FC	Seattle, Washington	Lumen Field	37,722	2009	Brian Schmetzer
Western	St. Louis City SC	St. Louis, Missouri	Energizer Park	22,423	2023	Yoann Damet
Western	Vancouver Whitecaps FC	Vancouver, British Columbia	BC Place	22,120	2011	Jesper Sørensen

=== Former clubs ===
Club	Location	Stadium	Capacity	Joined	Final season
Tampa Bay Mutiny	Tampa, Florida	Raymond James Stadium	65,657	1996	2001
Miami Fusion	Fort Lauderdale, Florida	Lockhart Stadium	17,417	1998	2001
Chivas USA	Carson, California	StubHub Center	18,800	2005	2014

== League championships ==
As of the 2026 season, 33 different clubs have competed in the league, with 16 having won at least one MLS Cup, and 18 winning at least one Supporters' Shield. The two trophies have been won by the same club in the same year on eight occasions (two clubs have accomplished the feat twice). Of these teams only one, Toronto FC, has also won its national domestic cup tournament (in Toronto FC's case, the Canadian Championship) in the same year for a domestic treble.

MLS Cup titles and Supporters' Shield wins
Team	MLS Cups	Years won	Supporters' Shields	Years won	Total combined	MLS seasons
LA Galaxy	6	2002, 2005, 2011, 2012, 2014, 2024	4	1998, 2002, 2010, 2011	10	31
D.C. United	4	1996, 1997, 1999, 2004	4	1997, 1999, 2006, 2007	8	31
Columbus Crew	3	2008, 2020, 2023	3	2004, 2008, 2009	6	31
San Jose Earthquakes	2	2001, 2003	2	2005, 2012	4	29
Sporting Kansas City	2	2000, 2013	1	2000	3	31
Seattle Sounders FC	2	2016, 2019	1	2014	3	18
Houston Dynamo FC	2	2006, 2007	0	–	2	21
Los Angeles FC	1	2022	2	2019, 2022	3	9
Chicago Fire FC	1	1998	1	2003	2	29
Toronto FC	1	2017	1	2017	2	20
Inter Miami CF	1	2025	1	2024	2	7
Real Salt Lake	1	2009	0	–	1	22
Colorado Rapids	1	2010	0	–	1	31
Portland Timbers	1	2015	0	–	1	16
Atlanta United FC	1	2018	0	–	1	10
New York City FC	1	2021	0	–	1	12
New York Red Bulls	0	–	3	2013, 2015, 2018	3	31
Philadelphia Union	0	–	2	2020, 2025	2	17
Tampa Bay Mutiny	0	–	1	1996	1	6 (Note: Franchise folded after completion of the 2001 season)
Miami Fusion	0	–	1	2001	1	4
FC Dallas	0	–	1	2016	1	31
New England Revolution	0	–	1	2021	1	31
FC Cincinnati	0	–	1	2023	1	8
Nashville SC	0	–	1	2026	1	7

== Organization ==
=== Ownership ===
MLS operates under a single-entity structure in which teams and player contracts are centrally owned by the league. Each team has an investor-operator that is a shareholder in Major League Soccer LLC, the league's corporate owner. In order to control costs, MLS shares revenues and holds players contracts instead of players contracting with individual teams. In Fraser v. Major League Soccer, a lawsuit filed in 1996 and decided in 2002, the league won a legal battle with its players in which the court ruled that MLS was a single entity that can lawfully centrally contract for player services. The court also ruled that even absent their collective bargaining agreement, players could opt to play in other leagues if they were unsatisfied.

Having multiple clubs operated by a single investor was a necessity in the league's first ten years. At one time, Phil Anschutz's AEG operated six MLS franchises and Lamar Hunt's Hunt Sports operated three franchises. In order to attract additional investors, in 2002 the league announced changes to the operating agreement between the league and its teams to improve team revenues and increase the incentives to be an individual club operator. These changes included granting operators the rights to a certain number of players they develop through their club's academy system each year, sharing the profits of Soccer United Marketing, and being able to sell individual club jersey sponsorships.

As MLS appeared to be on the brink of overall profitability in 2006 and developed significant expansion plans, the league announced that it wanted each club to have a distinct operator. The league has attracted new investors that have injected more money into the league. Examples include Red Bull's purchase of the MetroStars from AEG in 2006 for over $100 million. For the 2014 season, the league assumed control of the former Chivas USA club, which had suffered from mismanagement and poor financial results under its individual operator relationship. The league eventually dissolved the team, in favor of awarding rights to a second soccer club in the Los Angeles area to a new investor group on October 30, 2014.

The league now has 30 investor-operators for its 30 current clubs, with no member of any club's investor group having a stake in that of any other club. Since December 2015, when AEG sold its remaining 50% interest in the Houston Dynamo, the former multiple-team operators AEG and Hunt Sports, with the LA Galaxy and FC Dallas respectively, now only control one franchise.

=== League executives ===
Don Garber has been the commissioner of Major League Soccer since 1999, serving as the league's chief executive. The league's first commissioner was Doug Logan, who served in the role from 1995 to 1999. Mark Abbott, a former MLS business partner, has served as the league's president and deputy commissioner since 2006. On August 3, 2026, the league announced that Los Angeles FC co-owner Larry Berg would become the next commissioner, assuming the position in January 2027 when Garber will assume the newly created position as league chairman.

=== League facilities ===
MLS is headquartered at 2 Pennsylvania Plaza in Midtown Manhattan, New York City. The two-floor office has 126,000 square feet (11,700 m^{2}) of space for 500 employees. It opened in May 2026 to replace an office at 420 5th Avenue, also in Midtown Manhattan. Prior to moving to New York City in 1996, the league's main office was in Los Angeles. MLS Season Pass content is produced through a partnership with IMG at the Studios at WWE in Stamford, Connecticut. The video assistant referee system used by MLS is operated by the American branch of Sportec Solutions at a facility in Arlington, Texas, that opened in 2024.

=== Player acquisition and salaries ===
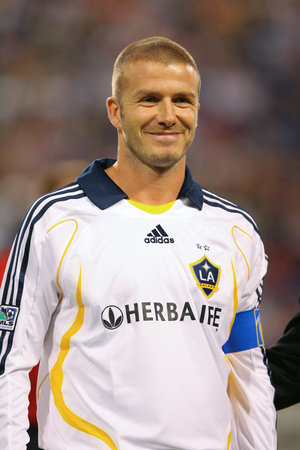
David Beckham was the league's first Designated Player in 2007.

In 2016, the average salary for MLS players was $373,094, lower than the average salaries in England's second-tier EFL Championship ($420,000 in 2015), the Netherlands' Eredivisie ($445,000), or Mexico's Liga MX ($418,000 in 2015). The league's minimum player salary increased in 2017 to $65,000 for most players, and roster players #25–30 saw their minimum salary increased to $53,000.

MLS salaries are limited by a salary cap, which MLS has had in place since the league's inception in 1996. The purpose of the salary cap is to prevent the team's owners from unsustainable spending on player salaries and to prevent a competitive imbalance among teams. The salary cap survived a legal challenge by the players in the Fraser v. Major League Soccer lawsuit. The 2017 salary cap increased to $3.845 million per team. Each team is allowed up to 30 players on its first team roster. All 30 players are eligible for selection to each 18-player matchday squad during the regular season and playoffs.

Teams may augment their squads by signing players from other leagues. MLS has two transfer windows—the primary pre-season transfer window lasts three months from mid February until mid May, and the secondary mid season transfer window runs one month from early July to early August. When an MLS club sells one of its players overseas, the club and the league split the transfer revenues, with the club retaining from 33% to 75% depending on the player's status and tenure. MLS teams have a limited number of international roster slots that they can use to sign non-domestic players. However, MLS teams often obtain green cards for their non-domestic players in order to qualify them for domestic status and thus free up international roster slots. In 2015, 49% of MLS players were born outside of the U.S. and Canada, with players from 58 countries represented.

MLS has a set of pool goalkeepers who are signed to a contract with the league and are loaned to teams during emergencies in which they are missing a goalkeeper due to injuries or suspensions. The pool goalkeeper trains with an MLS club or an affiliated team when not assigned to a team; some pool goalkeepers, including Tim Melia, have gone on to be signed to permanent contract with their assigned teams. In the past, when rosters were smaller, there were multiple goalkeepers signed to the pool, however, in recent years only one or two keepers are signed as team rosters are much larger.

==== Designated Players and allocation money ====
MLS has also introduced various initiatives and rules intended to improve quality of players while still maintaining the salary cap. Rules concerning Designated Players and allocation money allow for additional wage spending that is exempt from the salary cap. These initiatives have brought about an increase in on-field competition.

The Designated Player Rule (DPR) allows teams to sign a limited number of players whose salary exceeds the maximum cap; in 2017, each DP only counted as $480,625 (the maximum non-DP salary) against the cap. Instituted in 2007, England's David Beckham was the first signing under the DPR. The DPR has led to large income inequality in MLS with top DPs earning as much as 180 times more than a player earning the league minimum. In the 2013 season, 21% of the league's wage spending went to just five players; this stretched to 29% on the top 6 players in the 2014 season.

The league's "Core Players" initiative allows teams to re-sign players using retention funds that do not count against the salary cap. Retention funds were implemented in 2013 as a mechanism for MLS to retain key players; among the first high-profile players re-signed using retention funds were U.S. national team regulars Graham Zusi and Matt Besler. MLS teams can also obtain allocation money, which is money that the team can use on player salaries that does not count against the cap, and teams can earn allocation money in several ways, such as from the transfer fees earned by selling players to teams in other leagues. MLS teams can also use Targeted Allocation Money (often referred to as TAM), an initiative announced in 2015. Teams can use TAM funds to attract high-profile players by "buying down" contracts of players to below the DP level. High-profile players for which TAM funds were used include Hector Villalba, Zlatan Ibrahimović and Giorgio Chiellini.

=== Youth development ===
MLS has introduced various initiatives and rules intended to develop young players and has required all of its teams to operate youth development programs since 2008. MLS roster rules allow teams to sign an unlimited number of players straight from their academies and bypassing the draft process. There is also supplementary salary budget made by MLS only for homegrown players that are registered using senior roster slots called homegrown player funds. One of the most prominent and lucrative examples of success in "home-grown" development was Jozy Altidore, who rose to prominence as a teenager in MLS before his record transfer fee $10 million move to Villarreal in Spain in 2008. The various MLS teams' development academies play matches in a U.S. Soccer developmental league against youth academies from other leagues such as the North American Soccer League (NASL), which had been a Division II league prior to 2018, and USL Pro, originally a Division III league but now the Division II USL Championship.

The league operates a Generation Adidas program, which is a joint venture between MLS and U.S. Soccer that encourages young American players to enter MLS. Rules concerning Generation Adidas players and home-grown players provide incentives for clubs to develop and retain young players. The Generation Adidas program has been in place since 1997, and has introduced players such as Landon Donovan, Clint Dempsey, Tim Howard and Michael Bradley into MLS. Players under the Homegrown Player Rule are signed to Generation Adidas contracts, all players on Generation Adidas contracts are "off budget players" and their salaries do not count against the cap.

MLS has operated reserve leagues, which give playing time to players who were not starters for their MLS teams, during two different periods. The MLS Reserve League was formed in 2005, and operated through 2014 (with the exception of the 2009 & 2010 seasons). MLS began integrating its Reserve League with the league then known as USL Pro in 2013, and after the 2014 season folded the Reserve League, with MLS then requiring all teams to either affiliate with a USL team or field their own reserve side in that league. However, this requirement was never strictly enforced, and MLS eventually relaunched its reserve league in 2022 under the banner of MLS Next Pro. In the inaugural 2022 season, 19 of the league's then-current clubs, plus future club St. Louis City SC, fielded reserve sides in Next Pro. In the 2023 season, the only MLS teams that did not field Next Pro sides were CF Montréal and D.C. United.

Following the folding of the Development Academy, MLS announced its own development league in 2020. It includes all of the MLS team academies as well as 95 clubs across the country; many of which were a part of the Development Academy.

=== Stadiums ===
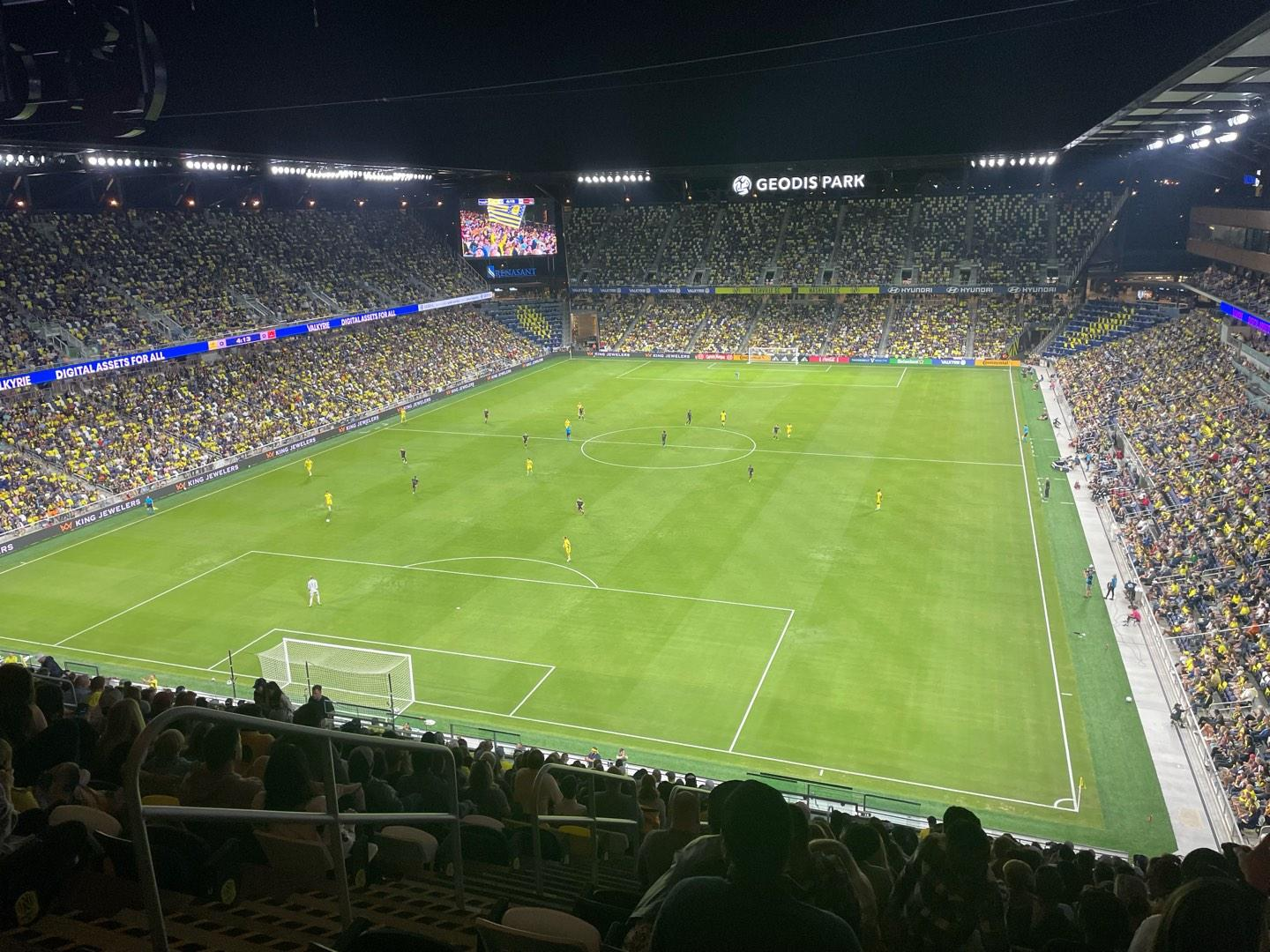
The Geodis Park, home of the Nashville SC is the biggest soccer specific stadium in the United States with a capacity of 30,109 people.

Since 1999, the league has overseen the construction of twelve stadiums specifically designed for soccer. The development of soccer-specific stadiums owned by the teams has generated a better matchday experience for the fans. The soccer-specific stadiums have yielded positive financial results as teams were no longer required to pay to rent out facilities and gained control over revenue streams such as concessions, parking, naming rights, and the ability to host non-MLS events. Several teams have doubled their season tickets following the team's move into a soccer-specific stadium. The establishment of soccer-specific stadiums is considered the key to the league and the ability of teams to turn a profit. In 2006, Tim Leiweke, then CEO of Anschutz Entertainment Group, described the proliferation of soccer-specific stadiums as the turning point for MLS.

Columbus Crew owner Lamar Hunt started this trend in 1999 by constructing Columbus Crew Stadium, now known as Historic Crew Stadium, as MLS' first soccer-specific stadium. The Los Angeles Galaxy followed four years later with the opening of the Home Depot Center, now Dignity Health Sports Park, in 2003. FC Dallas opened Pizza Hut Park, now Toyota Stadium, in 2005, and the Chicago Fire began playing their home matches in Toyota Park, now SeatGeek Stadium, in 2006. The 2007 season brought the opening of Dick's Sporting Goods Park for the Colorado Rapids and BMO Field for Toronto FC.

Near the end of the 2008 season, Rio Tinto Stadium (now known as America First Field) became the home of Real Salt Lake, which meant that for the first time in MLS history a majority of MLS teams (8 out of 14) played in soccer-specific stadiums. Red Bull Arena, now Sports Illustrated Stadium, the new home of the New York Red Bulls, opened for the start of the 2010 season, and the Philadelphia Union opened PPL Park, now Subaru Park, in June 2010, midway through their inaugural season.

The following season, in 2011, the Portland Timbers made their MLS debut in a newly renovated Jeld-Wen Field, now renamed Providence Park, which was originally a multi-purpose venue but turned into a soccer-specific facility. Also in 2011, Sporting Kansas City moved to new Livestrong Sporting Park, now Children's Mercy Park. The Houston Dynamo relocated to their new home at BBVA Compass Stadium, now Shell Energy Stadium, in 2012. In the same year, the Montreal Impact joined the league in an expanded Stade Saputo, which reopened in June 2012, when renovations pushed the seating capacity to over 20,000. The Impact has used Olympic Stadium for early season matches and for matches that require a larger capacity. The San Jose Earthquakes, who had played at Buck Shaw Stadium from 2008 until 2014, opened their new Avaya Stadium (now PayPal Park) before the 2015 season. Orlando City SC intended to begin constructing its soccer-specific stadium, now known as Inter.co Stadium, in 2014 to be completed in 2015. Delays caused by changes to the stadium plans pushed back the new venue's opening, first to late 2016 and finally to the start of the 2017 season. Orlando City played at the Florida Citrus Bowl Stadium, now Camping World Stadium, while awaiting the construction of their new venue through the 2016 season. Exploria Stadium hosted its first MLS match on March 5, 2017, against New York City FC as Orlando City Stadium.

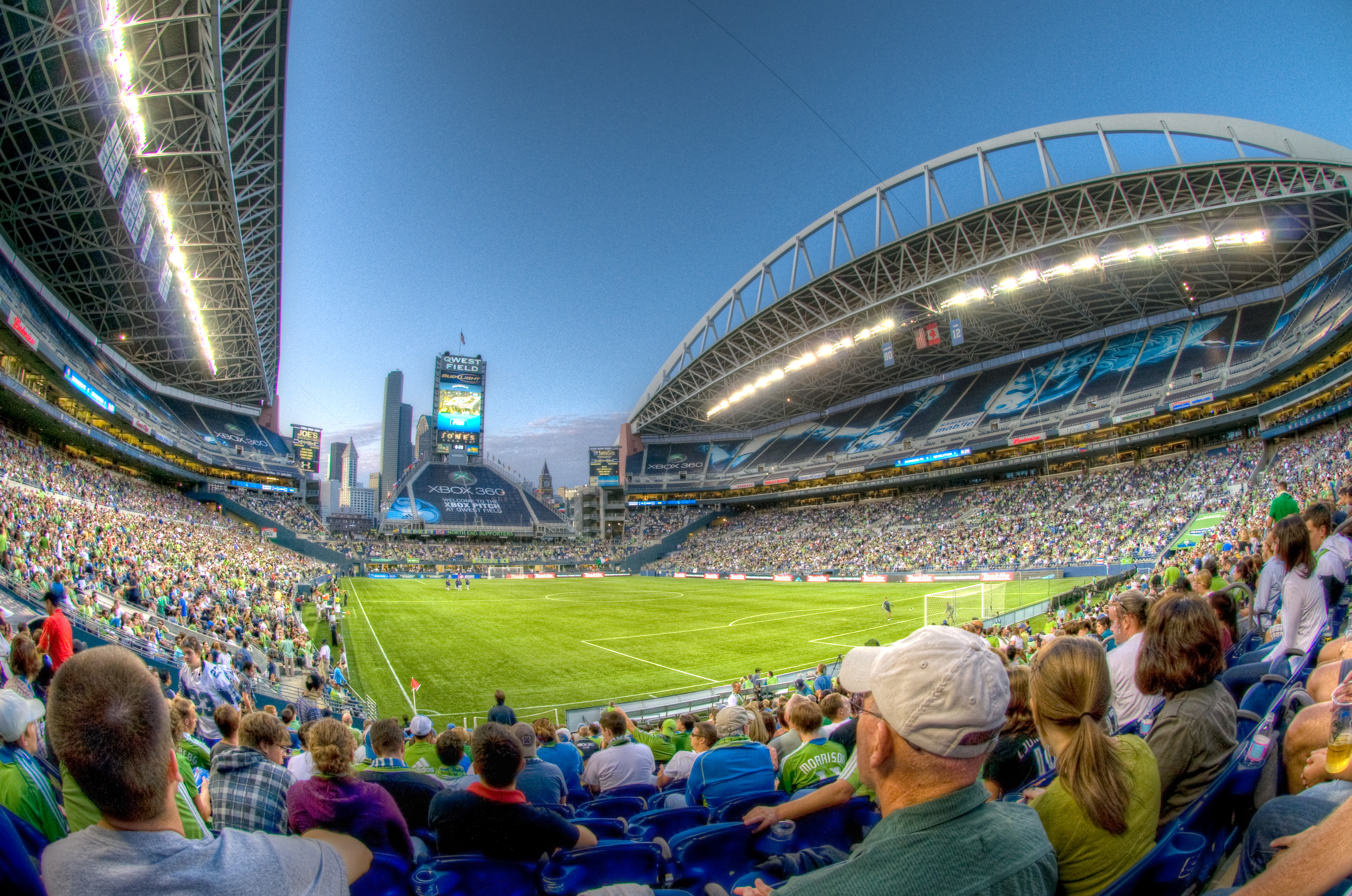
Lumen Field, home of Seattle Sounders FC

The development of additional MLS stadiums has continued to progress. D.C. United had played their home matches at former NFL and MLB venue RFK Stadium. In 2013, D.C. United announced the signing of a public-private partnership term sheet to build a new soccer stadium in Washington, D.C., and a final deal was reached in late 2014. In late February 2017, D.C. United finally broke ground on their new stadium, Audi Field. After 21 years of playing at RFK Stadium, D.C. United played their first match at Audi Field in July 2018.

Two teams have announced their desire to build a soccer-specific stadium, although these teams have not finalized the stadium site and received all necessary government approvals. New York City FC play home matches at Yankee Stadium, an MLB venue, although they intend to move into Etihad Park, expected to be completed by the 2027 season. The New England Revolution play home matches at Gillette Stadium, which is an NFL stadium also owned by the Revolution's owner, Robert Kraft. The team is currently in discussion with the City of Boston regarding a potential soccer-specific stadium in South Boston.

Several remaining clubs play in stadiums not originally built for MLS and have not announced plans to move. The Seattle Sounders FC play at Lumen Field, a dual-purpose facility used for both American football and soccer. The Vancouver Whitecaps FC joined the league with Portland in 2011 and temporarily held matches at Empire Field before moving into the refurbished BC Place in October 2011, a retractable-roof stadium that hosts Canadian football as well as soccer.

Of the three teams that made their MLS debuts in 2017 and 2018, one opened a soccer-specific stadium in 2019, a second is playing in a shared football stadium, and the last opened a soccer-specific stadium for its inaugural 2018 season. Minnesota United FC, which debuted in 2017, built Allianz Field in St. Paul which hosted its inaugural match against New York City FC on April 13, 2019. Until that time, the team played in Minneapolis at TCF Bank Stadium (now Huntington Bank Stadium), home to University of Minnesota football. Atlanta United FC began play in 2017 at a college football facility, Georgia Tech's Bobby Dodd Stadium, before moving into its permanent home at the retractable-roof Mercedes-Benz Stadium, which it shares with the NFL's Atlanta Falcons; both teams are owned by Arthur Blank and the stadium is equipped with screens to cordon off the upper tiers for most matches. Los Angeles FC, which began play in 2018, opened Banc of California Stadium (now BMO Stadium) on the former site of the Los Angeles Sports Arena in April of its inaugural season.

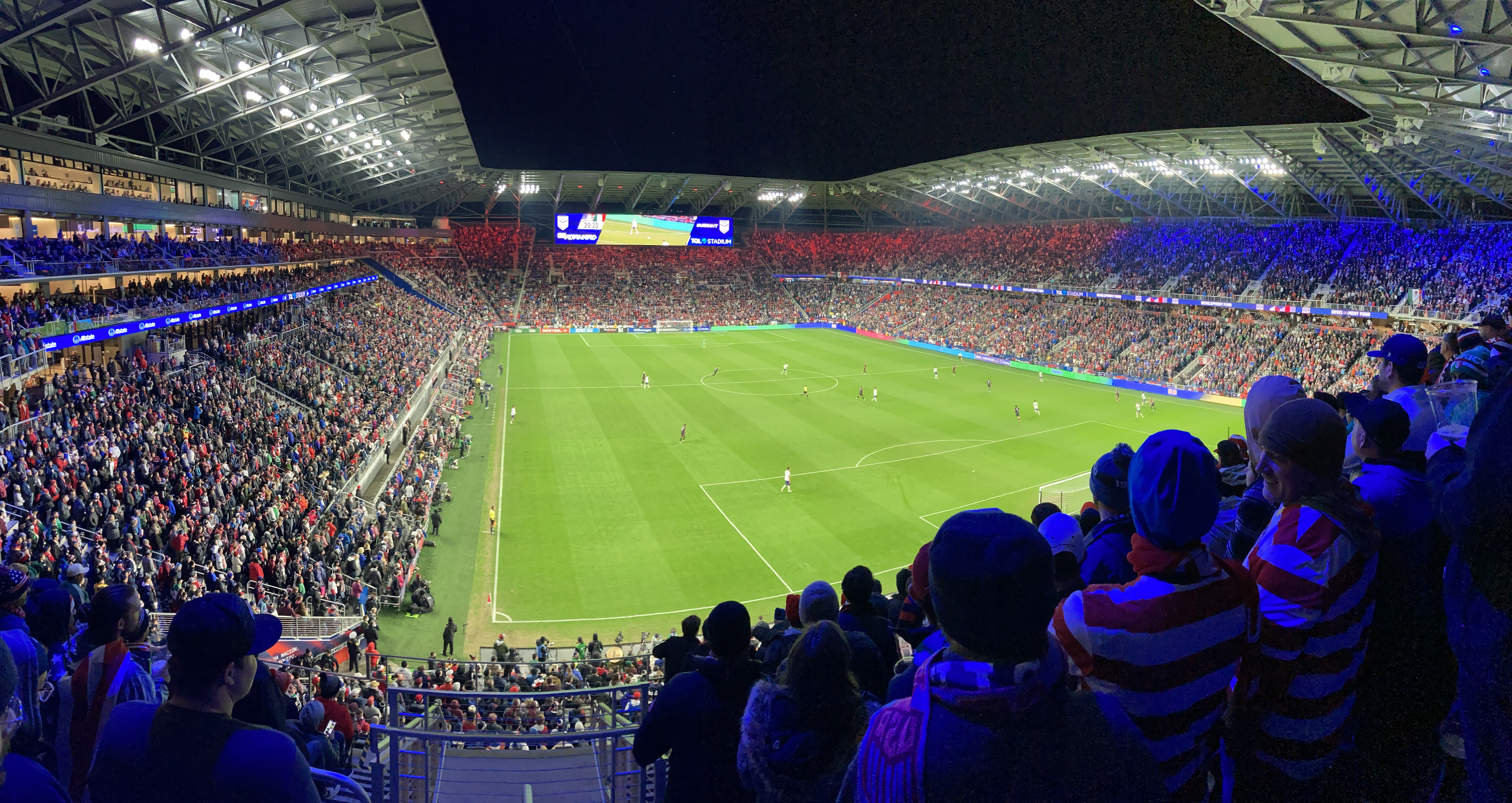
FC Cincinnati's TQL Stadium in 2021

FC Cincinnati made its MLS debut in 2019 at Nippert Stadium, the home of the University of Cincinnati football. The stadium had been home to FCC's USL Championship predecessor for all of its three seasons of play. The club moved within Cincinnati to the new TQL Stadium in 2021. Inter Miami began play in 2020 at Inter Miami CF Stadium, now known as Chase Stadium, at the former site of Lockhart Stadium in Fort Lauderdale before opening Miami Freedom Park in the future. Nashville SC played the 2020 and 2021 seasons at an NFL facility, Nissan Stadium, home of the Tennessee Titans, before opening Geodis Park in 2022. Austin FC opened Q2 Stadium for its first season in 2021. St. Louis City SC opened CityPark, now Energizer Park, in November 2022, a few months before the club's first season in 2023. Construction of Eleven Park was tied to an application for an Indianapolis-based MLS team, initialized in 2024.

=== Profitability and revenues ===
Average franchise valuations
Year	Value
2008	$37 million
2013	$103 million
2015	$157 million
2016	$185 million
2017	$223 million
2018	$240 million
2019	$313 million
2021	$550 million
2022	$582 million
2023	$678 million
2025	$721 million

Major League Soccer began to demonstrate positive signs of long-term profitability as early as 2004 with the single-entity ownership structure, salary cap, and the media and marketing umbrella Soccer United Marketing (SUM) all contributing towards MLS' financial security. As soccer-specific stadiums were built, ownership expanded, and television coverage increased, MLS saw its revenues increase while controlling costs.

Television coverage and revenue have increased since the league's early years. In 2006, MLS reached an 8-year TV deal with ESPN spanning the 2007–2014 seasons, and marked the first time that MLS earned rights fees, reported to be worth $7–8 million annually. In September 2012 the league extended its distribution agreement with London-based Media rights agency MP & Silva until 2014 in a deal worth $10 million annually. Total league TV revenues are over $40 million annually. In 2011, MLS earned $150 million when it sold a 25% stake in SUM.

Jersey sponsorships
Team	Sponsor	Annual value
Atlanta United FC	AmFam (game – main); Emory Healthcare (game – sleeve)	Undisclosed
Austin FC	Yeti (game – main); Siete Foods (game – sleeve); St. David's Healthcare (prematch)	Undisclosed
Charlotte FC	Ally (game – main); Rugs.com (game – sleeve)	Undisclosed
Chicago Fire FC	Carvana (game – main); Magellan Corporation (game - sleeve)	Undisclosed
FC Cincinnati	Mercy Health (game – main); Kroger (game – sleeve)	Undisclosed
Colorado Rapids	UCHealth (game – main)	Undisclosed
Columbus Crew	Nationwide (game – main); DHL (game – sleeve); Ohio Health (prematch)	$3 million
D.C. United	Guidehouse (game – main); The Fruitist (game - sleeve)	Undisclosed
FC Dallas	Children's Health (game - main); UT Southwestern (game – main); AdvoCare (game – sleeve)	Undisclosed
Houston Dynamo FC	MD Anderson Cancer Center (game – main)	Undisclosed
Inter Miami CF	Royal Caribbean (game – main); Fracht Group (game – sleeve); AutoNation (prematch)	Undisclosed
LA Galaxy	Herbalife (game – main); RBC (game – sleeve)	$4.4 million
Los Angeles FC	Bank of Montreal (game – main); Ford (game – sleeve); Rockstar (prematch)	Undisclosed
Minnesota United FC	Target (game – main); NutriSource (game – sleeve); Blue Cross and Blue Shield of Minnesota (prematch)	Undisclosed
CF Montréal	Bank of Montreal (game – main); Telus (game – sleeve)	US$4 million
Nashville SC	Renasant (game – main); Hyundai (game – sleeve); Vanderbilt Health (prematch)	Undisclosed
New England Revolution	UnitedHealthcare (game – main); Socios.com (prematch)	Undisclosed
New York City FC	Etihad Airways (game – main); Judi Health (fka. Capital Rx) (game – sleeve); NewYork–Presbyterian Hospital (prematch)	Undisclosed
New York Red Bulls	Red Bull (game – main); Oanda (game – sleeve)	Owns club
Orlando City SC	Orlando Health (game – main)	Undisclosed
Philadelphia Union	Bimbo Bakeries USA (game – main); Independence Blue Cross (game – sleeve)	$3 million
Portland Timbers	Bank of America (game – main); Dutch Brothers Coffee (prematch)	Undisclosed
Real Salt Lake	Select Health (game – main); Intermountain Health (game – sleeve)	Undisclosed
San Diego FC	DirecTV (game – main)	Undisclosed
San Jose Earthquakes	El Camino Health (game – main); Habbas Law (game – sleeve); Udemy (prematch)	Undisclosed
Seattle Sounders FC	Providence (game – main); Emerald Queen Casino (game – sleeve); CHI Franciscan (prematch)	Undisclosed
Sporting Kansas City	Compass Minerals (game – main)	Undisclosed
St. Louis City SC	Purina (game – main); BJC HealthCare (game – sleeve)	Undisclosed
Toronto FC	Bank of Montreal (game – main); LG (game – sleeve)	C$4 million+
Vancouver Whitecaps FC	Telus (game – main); BLG (game - sleeve)	Undisclosed

In early 2005, MLS signed a 10-year, $150 million sponsorship deal with Adidas for its jerseys and other equipment. In 2007, MLS teams started selling ad space on the front of jerseys to go along with the league-wide sponsorship partners who had already been advertising on the back of club jerseys, following the practice of international sport, specifically soccer. MLS established a floor of $500,000 per shirt sponsorship, with the league receiving a flat fee of $200,000 per deal. As of July 2014, sixteen teams had signed sponsorship deals to have company logos placed on the front of their jerseys (and another team is directly owned by its shirt sponsor), and the league average from jersey sponsors was about $2.4 million. Sleeve sponsorship was introduced to MLS in the 2020 season, with the teams able to sell a 2-by-2-inch (51 by 51 mm) section on the right arm where the league logo patch is normally positioned.

The LA Galaxy made a profit in 2003 in their first season at The Home Depot Center, and FC Dallas turned a profit after moving into Pizza Hut Park in 2005. For each season between 2006 and 2009, two to three MLS clubs (generally clubs with a soccer-specific stadium) were reported as profitable by the league. In November 2013, Forbes published a report that revealed that ten of the league's nineteen teams earned an operating profit in 2012, while two broke even and seven had a loss. Forbes estimated that the league's collective annual revenues were $494 million, and that the league's collective annual profit was $34 million. Forbes valued the league's franchises to be worth $103 million on average, almost three times as much as the $37 million average valuation in 2008. The Seattle Sounders FC franchise was named the most valuable at $175 million, a 483% gain over the $30 million league entrance fee it paid in 2009.

The trend in increased team values has continued with MLS teams seeing a strong 52% increase in franchise values from 2012 to 2014. In August 2015 Forbes updated its MLS franchise values with the most profitable team measuring $245 million and the least $105 million. The average value jumped from $103 to $157 million. In 2018, Forbes estimated Atlanta United FC is the most valuable MLS team, worth $330 million, while the Colorado Rapids are the lowest value, at $155 million. These valuations do not include the value of stadiums or training facilities owned by the respective clubs. A Sportico ranking of club valuations in 2024 placed 20 MLS teams in the top 50 globally, with Los Angeles FC the most valuable at $1.15 billion (15th overall).

Prior to the COVID-19 pandemic, MLS teams typically used commercial flights to transport players and staff between matches, with only four charter flights allowed under league rules. These commercial flights were often non-direct, requiring transfers and layovers, and contributed to long travel days. The number of charters allowed for league matches was increased to eight legs prior to the 2020 season and lifted entirely due to the COVID-19 pandemic. Sun Country Airlines has provided charter service to MLS teams since 2020 and became the league's official carrier in 2022.

=== Rules and officials ===
When the league began play, it tried to gain popularity by "Americanizing" the game: the game clock counted down in each half and stopped for certain dead ball, and matches level at the end of regulation were resolved with a running penalty shootout. Now MLS follows the rules and standards of the International Football Association Board (IFAB). Since 2005, the playoff extra time structure follows IFAB standards: two full 15-minute periods, followed by a penalty shootout if necessary.

U.S. Soccer hired the first full-time professional referees in league history in 2007 as part of the league's "Game First" initiatives. Major League Soccer has been implementing fines and suspensions since the 2011 season for simulation (diving) through its Disciplinary Committee, which reviews plays after the match. The first player fined under the new rule was Charlie Davies, fined $1,000 for intentionally deceiving match officials.

MLS uses the list of banned substances published by the World Anti-Doping Agency.

=== Branding ===
The current MLS logo debuted in 2014, ahead of the league's 20th season, replacing an earlier logo that featured a stylized boot and ball. The current logo is a simple crest with a diagonal stripe, the MLS wordmark, and three stars that represent "community, club, and country". The logo was designed to be remixed in different color schemes that match teams when used on merchandise and jerseys.

The first MLS anthem was unveiled in 2007 and was composed by Audiobrain. The current league anthem debuted in 2020 and was composed by film score composer Hans Zimmer. It's used during league broadcasts and as a prelude to kickoff at stadiums.

==== Team names ====
In the early years of MLS, teams were typically given official nicknames in the style of other U.S. sports leagues (e.g., Columbus Crew, Los Angeles Galaxy, New England Revolution). Several club names in MLS originated with previous professional soccer clubs, such as the 1970s-era NASL team names San Jose Earthquakes, Seattle Sounders, Portland Timbers, and Vancouver Whitecaps.

D.C. United was the only MLS team to adopt European naming conventions during the 1990s. In more recent years, European-style names have become increasingly common in MLS, with expansion teams such as Real Salt Lake, Toronto FC, New York City FC, Atlanta United FC, Minnesota United FC, and FC Cincinnati, along with rebrandings such as FC Dallas (formerly the Dallas Burn), Sporting Kansas City (formerly the Kansas City Wizards), and CF Montréal (formerly the Montreal Impact).

Austrian beverage company Red Bull GmbH owns and sponsors the New York Red Bulls as well as other sports teams outside the U.S.

== Media coverage ==
=== MLS Season Pass on Apple TV ===
Since 2023, all MLS and Leagues Cup matches, as well as certain matches from MLS Next Pro and MLS Next, are streamed worldwide on MLS Season Pass via Apple TV. This agreement ended the previous regional sports network-based system. The contract allows for some broadcasts on linear television. ESPN and Univision exited negotiations, apparently because MLS would not allow them to stream via their own platforms or use their own commentators. Following their departures, Fox Sports joined Apple as MLS' linear broadcast partners in the U.S., with Bell Media's TSN and RDS doing so in Canada.

=== United States ===
From 2012 to 2014, MLS matches were broadcast by NBC Sports, with 40 matches per year—primarily on NBCSN, and select matches broadcast on the NBC network. The move from Fox Soccer to the more widely distributed NBCSN caused viewership numbers to double for the 2012 season.

Soccer United Marketing partnered with Google and Bedrocket Media Ventures in 2012 to launch "KickTV", a premium YouTube channel with original soccer programming. KickTV was sold to Copa90 in 2015 to form its American branch. In 2020, Soccer United Marketing signed a multi-year agreement with Bleacher Report to produce content and highlights for MLS and the U.S. national teams through the 2022 season.

From 2015 to 2022, MLS matches were broadcast nationally by ESPN networks and Fox Sports in English, and Univision networks in Spanish under an eight-year contract. Each broadcaster had a window for national regular season matches, with UniMás airing a game on Friday nights in Spanish and additional matches on Univision Deportes Network, and ESPN and Fox Sports 1 airing matches on Sunday evenings in English. ESPN, FS1, and Univision shared coverage of the playoffs, while ABC and Fox alternated broadcasting the MLS Cup final in English. In total, at least 125 matches were aired per season across all three networks. The three contracts have an average estimated value of $90 million per season—five times larger than the average $18 million value of the previous contracts with ESPN, Univision, and NBC Sports.

Matches not televised nationally were broadcast regionally, often by regional sports networks like Bally Sports, NBC Sports Regional Networks, Spectrum Sports and Root Sports, and sometimes by terrestrial stations like KTXA, WGN and KMYU. Regionally televised matches were available outside their local markets on ESPN+, which replaced MLS Live from 2018 until 2022.

=== Canada ===
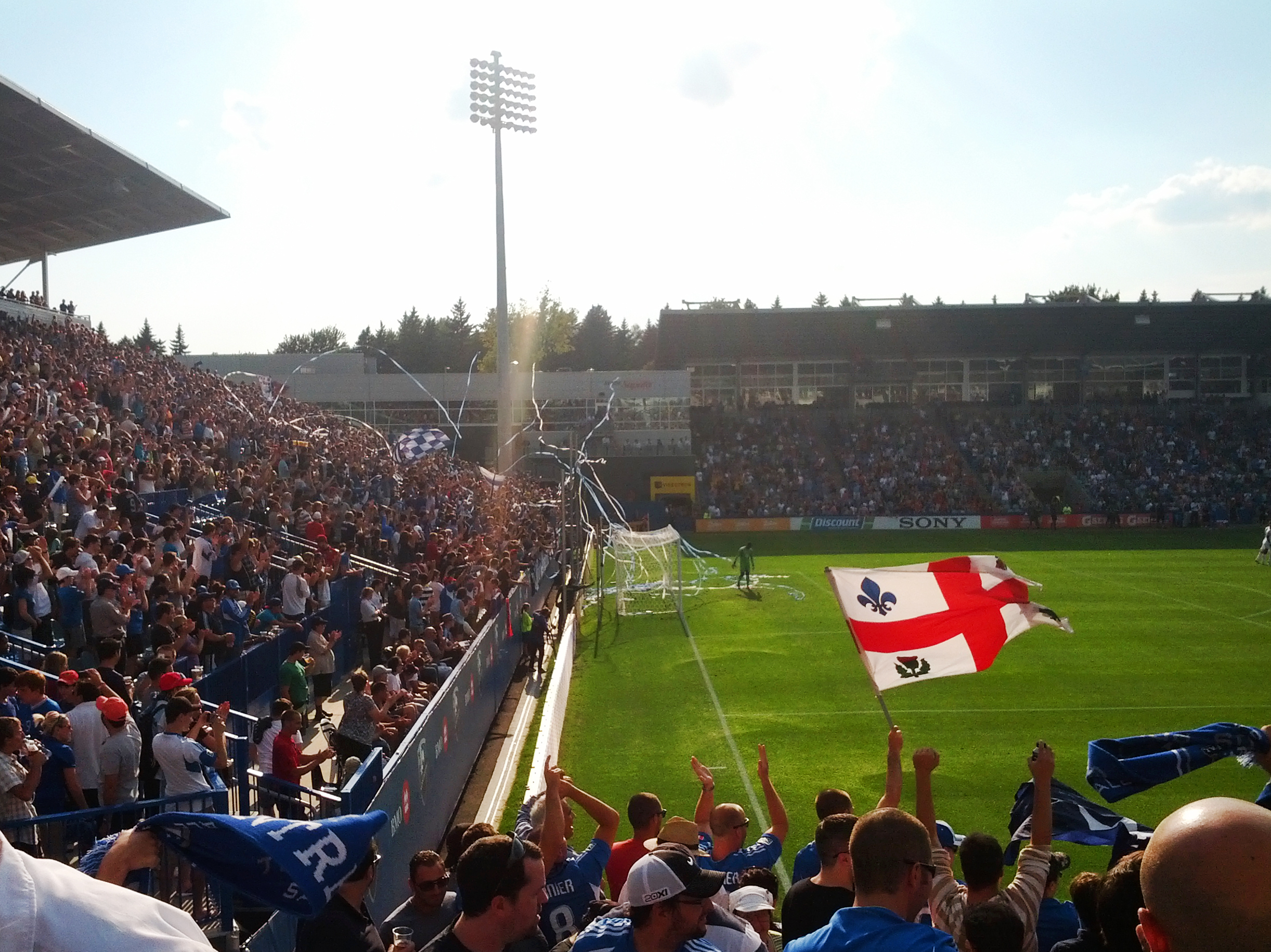
Montreal Impact hosting D.C. United (August 2012).

Currently, English-language national MLS broadcast rights in Canada are held by the TSN networks through a five-year deal first renewed in 2017. The networks primarily broadcast matches involving the league's Canadian franchises, in combination with separate "regional" rights deals giving TSN exclusive rights to all Toronto FC and Vancouver Whitecaps FC matches. A limited number of matches are also carried by CTV.

TVA Sports held exclusive French-language rights to MLS in Canada from 2017 to 2023. As part of a separate "regional" rights deal, it also held exclusive rights to all CF Montréal matches .

In 2018, online streaming service DAZN obtained the league's digital out-of-market service MLS Live with live and on-demand streaming of matches featuring U.S. teams (matches with Canadian teams were only available after a 48-hour delay to protect the league's main rightsholders TSN and TVA Sports).

=== International ===
MLS also entered into a four-year contract with Sky Sports to broadcast two MLS matches per week in the United Kingdom and Ireland from 2015 to 2019. As part of the agreement, Sky Sports broadcast at least two MLS regular season matches each week, as well as the MLS All-Star Game, every MLS Cup Playoff game, and the MLS Cup final. The matches appeared across Sky's family of networks. It also carried weekly MLS highlights across various platforms, including Sky Sports News and SkySports.com. Sky Sports also broadcast at least one match from MLS' "Decision Day" – the final day of the MLS regular season. Many of the matches on Decision Day every year are expected to determine the final spots for the MLS Cup Playoffs.

DSport, owned by Discovery Communications, began televising league matches in India in 2017.

SBS Sport Australia broadcast one MLS game per week in Australia from 2025.

=== Video games ===
Major League Soccer is a playable league in the EA Sports FC series, the eFootball series, and the Football Manager series. The league made its video game debut in 1999 with FIFA 2000. Kids video game company Humongous Entertainment had the rights to teams and players for their game, Backyard Soccer MLS Edition and for Backyard Soccer 2004. In 2000, Konami released ESPN MLS GameNight, and two years later, they released its sequel, ESPN MLS ExtraTime 2002. The league made its first appearance in the management series Football Manager 2005 in 2004.

== Player records ==
Statistics below are for all-time leaders. Statistics are for regular season only. Bold indicates active MLS players.

As of August 23, 2026

Goals
Rank	Player	Years	Goals
1	(United States) Chris Wondolowski	2005–2021	171
2	(Sierra Leone) Kei Kamara	2006–2013; 2015–2020; 2022–2025	147
3	(United States) Landon Donovan	2001–2014; 2016	145
4	(United States) Jeff Cunningham	1998–2011	134
5	(Bolivia) Jaime Moreno	1996–2010	133
6	(Venezuela) **Josef Martínez**	2017–2025; 2026–present	132
7	(England) Bradley Wright-Phillips	2013–2021	117
8	(United States) Ante Razov	1996–2000; 2001–2009	114
9	(United States) Jason Kreis	1996–2007	108
10	(United States) Gyasi Zardes	2013–2024	106

Assists
Rank	Player	Years	Assists
1	(United States) Landon Donovan	2001–2014; 2016	136
2	(United States) Steve Ralston	1996–2010	135
3	(United States) Brad Davis	2002–2016	123
4	(Colombia) Carlos Valderrama	1996–2002	114
5	(United States) Preki	1996–2005	112
6	(Bolivia) Jaime Moreno	1996–2010	102
7	(Bolivia) Marco Etcheverry	1996–2003	101
8	(United States) Sacha Kljestan	2006–2010; 2015–2022	99
9	(Spain) **Carles Gil**	2019–present	96
10	(Argentina) **Cristian Espinoza**	2019–present	92

Shutouts (clean sheets)
Rank	Player	Years	Shutouts
1	(United States) Nick Rimando	2000–2019	154
2	(United States) Kevin Hartman	1997–2013	112
3	(Switzerland) **Stefan Frei**	2009–present	105
4	(United States) **Sean Johnson**	2010–present	96
5	(United States) Joe Cannon	1999–2013	86
6	(United States) Jon Busch	2002–2015	83
7	(United States) Bill Hamid	2009–2022	80
8	(United States) Brad Guzan	2012–2025	78
9	(United States) Zach Thornton	1996–2011	76
10	(United States) Matt Reis	1998–2013	75

Games played
Rank	Player	Years	Games
1	(United States) Nick Rimando	2000–2019	514
2	(United States) Kyle Beckerman	2000–2020	498
3	(United States) Dax McCarty	2006–2024	488
4	(Sierra Leone) Kei Kamara	2006–2013; 2015–2020; 2022–2025	464
5	(United States) **Sean Johnson**	2010–present	452
6	(United States) Darlington Nagbe	2011–2025	445
7	(Colombia) **Diego Chará**	2011–present	442
8	(United States) Jeff Larentowicz	2005–2020	437
9	(Uruguay) **Diego Fagúndez**	2011–present	436
10	(Switzerland) **Stefan Frei**	2009–present	433

=== Player records (active) ===
Statistics below are for all-time leaders who are still playing in the league. Statistics are for regular season only.

As of November 1,2026

Goals
Rank	Player	Goals
1	(Venezuela) Josef Martínez	132
2	(Germany) Hany Mukhtar	98
3	(United States) Brian White	94
4	(Gabon) Denis Bouanga	82
5	(Argentina) Lionel Messi	76

Assists
Rank	Player	Assists
1	(Spain) Carles Gil	93
2	(Argentina) Cristian Espinoza	92
3	(Argentina) Maxi Moralez	91
4	(United States) Julian Gressel	81
5	(Uruguay) Diego Fagúndez	80

Shutouts
Rank	Player	Shutouts
1	(Switzerland) Stefan Frei	105
2	(United States) Sean Johnson	96
3	(Jamaica) Andre Blake	71

Games played
Rank	Player	Games
1	(United States) Sean Johnson	449
2	(Colombia) Diego Chará	440
3	(Uruguay) Diego Fagúndez	434
4	(Switzerland) Stefan Frei	433
5	(United States) Wil Trapp	374

== Awards ==
At the conclusion of each season, the league presents several awards for outstanding achievements, mostly to players, but also to coaches, referees, and teams. The finalists in each category are determined by voting from MLS players, team employees, and the media.

- MLS Best XI
- Sigi Schmid Coach of the Year Award
- MLS Comeback Player of the Year Award
- MLS Defender of the Year Award
- MLS Fair Play Award (individual & team)
- MLS Goal of the Year Award
- MLS Goalkeeper of the Year Award
- MLS Golden Boot
- MLS Humanitarian of the Year Award
- Landon Donovan MVP Award
- MLS Newcomer of the Year Award
- MLS Referee of the Year Award
- MLS Young Player of the Year Award
- MLS Save of the Year Award

== See also ==
- MLS SuperDraft
- List of Major League Soccer seasons
- List of American and Canadian soccer champions
- Major League Soccer attendance
- MLS Players Association

Preceded by NASL (1968–1984)	Division 1 soccer league in the United States; 1996–present	Succeeded by current league
