= FightBox =

- Genre: Game show
- Presented by: Trevor Nelson; Lisa Snowdon
- Voices of: Paul Dickenson
- Country of origin: United Kingdom
- Original language: English
- No. of series: 1
- No. of episodes: 20

Production
- Running time: 30 minutes
- Production company: FightBox Ltd.

Original release
- Network: BBC Three
- Release: 13 October – 10 November 2003

FightBox is a game show that aired on BBC Three from 13 October to 10 November 2003 and is hosted by Lisa Snowdon and Trevor Nelson with Paul Dickenson as commentator.

== Format ==
Contestants design their fighters and submit them to the BBC. Out of hundreds of submissions, only sixty were chosen to appear on the programme.

As well as battling each other, the fighters would face one of six "Sentients", warriors who had won previous (unseen) tournaments and achieved this honour. The Sentients were Banshi, Big George, Kodiak, Nail, Pearl and Vesuvius. Although immortal, they did have certain weaknesses which a fighter could use against them. After winning the first series, competitor warrior Kill Frenzy, created by Usman Arshad, achieved sentience and joined the current six. These seven Sentients featured in the video game mentioned below.

Six Games were played during the show these were: Conquest, Demolition, Duel, Helix, Panic and Revolution. Another game was Showdown, a straight one on one battle to determine the winner of each tournament.

== Production ==
FightBox was shot using ten cameras in front of an audience of around 200 people. The show used "FreeD" virtual camera technology, which allowed the creation of realtime composite images.

Several video game companies were considered for the development of the show's game engine, including Kuju and Warthog Games. Runecraft was eventually chosen for the job. During the airing of the show, Runecraft was shut down and to keep the show alive, BBC acquired the company and renamed it to Gamezlab, where it became part of BBC Multimedia. Gamezlab developed the video game adaptation for the PlayStation 2, PC and Game Boy Advance.

== Reception ==
After three weeks, the show had an average audience of 22,000 viewers.

== Video Game ==
FightBox
- Developer: Gamezlab
- Publisher: BBC Multimedia
- Platforms: Game Boy Advance; Microsoft Windows; PlayStation 2
- Release: UK: 6 February 2004
- Genre: Action
- Mode: Single-player

Following the TV show's conclusion, a video game adaptation for PlayStation 2, Microsoft Windows, and Game Boy Advance was released in the United Kingdom on 6 February 2004.
