= Noddy's Magic Adventure =

2000 video game

- Cover art of Noddy's Magic Adventure
- Developer: Mind's Eye Productions
- Publisher: BBC Multimedia
- Platform: PlayStation
- Release: EU: December 1, 2000
- Genre: Educational
- Mode: Single-player

Noddy's Magic Adventure is a children's educational video game released for the PlayStation in 2000, developed by Mind's Eye Productions and published by BBC Multimedia. The game is based on the character Noddy, created by Enid Blyton (specifically the TV series Noddy's Toyland Adventures).
