= FIFA 2000 =

1999 video game

- British and Irish cover featuring Tottenham Hotspur's Sol Campbell
- Developers: EA Canada; Tiertex (GBC)
- Publishers: EA Sports; THQ (GBC)
- Series: FIFA
- Platforms: Microsoft Windows; PlayStation; Game Boy Color
- Release: Windows, PlayStation: NA: 26 October 1999; EU: 5 November 1999; Game Boy Color: EU: December 1999; NA: 20 December 1999
- Genre: Sports
- Modes: Single-player, multiplayer

FIFA 2000 (titled FIFA 2000: Major League Soccer in North America) is a football simulation video game developed by EA Canada and published by Electronic Arts. It was the seventh game in the main FIFA series. The game was released for Microsoft Windows and PlayStation. A version for the Game Boy Color was developed by Tiertex Design Studios and published by THQ.

== Game features ==
Among the innovations for this edition of the series was the ability to play over consecutive seasons, giving the possibility of competing for promotion or relegation and qualification for European Cup competition. The US Major League Soccer was officially licensed for the first time, and was used as a subtitle for the North American release.

== Sound ==
Commentary in the UK English release is provided by BBC television commentators John Motson and Mark Lawrenson. The commentary was recorded in a London studio, however for the first time in the series Motson visited the games developers in Vancouver, Canada to provide insights into the intricacies of the real-life game. The US English release features commentary from ESPN broadcaster Phil Schoen and US international Julie Foudy. Localised commentary exists for the German, Spanish, French, Italian, Hebrew, Japanese, Greek and Brazilian Portuguese releases.

=== Soundtrack ===
The game's theme music was Robbie Williams' "It's Only Us". As part of the agreement to license the track EA Sports included Port Vale, the club Robbie Williams supports, in the game, despite only being in the second tier of the English football league system, which wasn't included as part of this game.

== Reception ==
Reception

Aggregate score
Aggregator	Score		
Aggregator	GBC	PC	PS
GameRankings	47%	85%	87%

Review scores
Publication	Score		
Publication	GBC	PC	PS
AllGame	3.5/5	3.5/5	3.5/5
CNET Gamecenter	N/A	8/10	10/10
Computer Games Strategy Plus	N/A	4/5	N/A
Computer Gaming World	N/A	4.5/5	N/A
Electronic Gaming Monthly	N/A	N/A	9.125/10
Game Informer	4.5/10	N/A	8.75/10
GameFan	N/A	N/A	92% (Note: In GameFan's viewpoint of the PlayStation version, one critic gave it 91, and the other 93.)
GameRevolution	N/A	A−	A−
GameSpot	5.4/10	9.1/10	9.4/10
GameSpy	N/A	90%	N/A
IGN	2/10	8.8/10	9.1/10
Official U.S. PlayStation Magazine	N/A	N/A	4.5/5
PC Accelerator	N/A	7/10	N/A
PC Gamer (US)	N/A	88%	N/A

The game was met with positive reception, with the exception of the Game Boy Color version, which currently has a score of 47% on GameRankings; the site also gave the PlayStation version 87%, and the PC version 85%. In Japan, where the PlayStation version was ported for release under the name FIFA 2000: Europa League Soccer (FIFA2000 ヨーロッパリーグ・サッカー, FIFA 2000 Yōropa Rīgu Sakkā) on 30 March 2000, Famitsu gave it a score of 28 out of 40.

PlayStation Max awarded a gold rating to the PlayStation version, praising its looks, sound and longevity, although they did criticise the ease with which it was possible to score goals. Official UK PlayStation Magazine went further with their criticism of the gameplay, believing the passing to be "too precise" and it being unrealistically easy to beat defenders. They did praise the level of detail in the game's graphics and the commentary and awarded the game a score of 7/10.

In one GamePro review, The Freshman said of the PlayStation version, "EA Sports knows football, both American and otherwise. Soccer fans would have to go a long way to find a better soccer sim on the PlayStation. Lace up those cleats and go for the goal!" (Note: GamePro gave the PlayStation version three 4.5/5 scores for graphics, control, and overall fun factor, and 5/5 for sound in one review.) Air Hendrix said of the same PlayStation version, "If you're into soccer, FIFA ranks as an automatic purchase. Plus, sports fans in general will find that–despite the game's minor flaws–FIFA's polished performance makes for exciting, rewarding fun that'll glue you to the screen." (Note: GamePro gave the PlayStation version two 5/5 scores for graphics and control, and two 4.5/5 scores for sound and overall fun factor in another review.) Nash Werner said that the PC version "has what I've always wanted: good single-player AI and the MLS. But players that look like cartoons, the absence of key offensive plays and jukes, and limited MLS playability, offset these additions. In the end, I like FIFA 99 better." (Note: GamePro gave the PC version two 4/5 scores for graphics and overall fun factor, 3.5/5 for sound, and 4.5/5 for control.)

By 2000, it had sold 500,000 units. The PlayStation version received a "Platinum" sales award from the Entertainment and Leisure Software Publishers Association (ELSPA), indicating sales of at least 300,000 units in the UK.

The PC version won the Academy of Interactive Arts & Sciences' "Computer Sports Game of the Year" award at the 3rd Annual Interactive Achievement Awards.
