= Audiobrain =

Sonic branding firm

- Industry: Sonic branding
- Founded: 2003
- Founder: Audrey Arbeeny
- Headquarters: New York City
- Website: audiobrain.com

Audiobrain is a sonic branding firm based in New York City.

== History ==
Audiobrain was founded in 2003.

Audrey Arbeeny, Audiobrain's Owner, Founder and Executive Producer, currently teaches Sonic Branding at New York's Pratt Institute.

== Projects ==
Notable projects of Audiobrain's include the sonic branding for Microsoft's Xbox 360 (including the sound logo and user interface sounds), sonic branding for author David Meerman Scott’s World Wide Rave, Virgin Mobile USA’s product sonification, and Major League Soccer's Official Anthem.

Audiobrain also serves as Music Supervisors for NBC Sports and Olympics, and received Emmy Awards for their work on the NBC Beijing Olympics and London Olympics broadcasts.
