= Play with the Teletubbies =

1998 video game

- Developer: Asylum Entertainment
- Publishers: EU: BBC Multimedia; NA: Knowledge Adventure
- Platforms: Microsoft Windows, PlayStation
- Release: Microsoft Windows: EU: 1998; NA: 1998; PlayStation: EU: 1999; NA: 1999
- Genre: Educational
- Mode: Single-player

Play with the Teletubbies is an educational video game developed by Asylum Entertainment based on the British children's television series Teletubbies, it was released for Microsoft Windows in 1998 and PlayStation in 1999.

== Gameplay ==
The primary gameplay consists of choosing a Teletubby and choosing various activities to perform with them, such as a game of hide-and-seek in which the player locates all of the hidden characters, banging a drum, or controlling the speed of a train. Certain activities are unique depending on the Teletubby the player choose to perform it with, such as the "Favourite Thing" activity, which features a unique item for each character.

The game also features 11 live-action clips that can be viewed by interacting with the windmill at the top of the map. These clips are viewed from the character's video screen in their stomach feature children telling the audience about what they are doing that day, often something promoting creativity or being outdoors, such as herding sheep. These clips are very reminiscent of an actual segment of the original television series where the same thing happens. Two magical events are also shown: a train and four clouds with accompanying music that can be moved up and down by the player.

== Development ==
According to Dave Lee, director of BBC Multimedia at the time of the games development, the gameplay was extensively tested with young children in a nursery, adding that the company was "delighted to see how quickly very young children adapted to using the PlayStation controls" when playing early versions of the software. The BBC hoped that the launch of the PlayStation 2 would cause more PlayStations to be passed on to younger members of the family increasing the possible player base. The developers intended for the game to have no objectives, with players exploring the world at their own pace. According to Lonnie Brown of The Ledger and Mary Hochberg of The Register-Guard, some of the tasks were designed so that the player did not need to interact with the game by using the controls but hold them over the object they want to use.

== Reception ==
Reception

Review scores
Publication	Score	
Publication	PC	PS
AllGame	4/5	3.5/5
PlayStation: The Official Magazine	N/A	1/10
The Guardian	N/A	1/5
Review Corner	N/A	3.5/5

Reviewing the PC version for AllGame, Brad Cook gave the game 4 stars out of 5, saying that the game did "an excellent job of transferring the popular British children's show to a computer game" and complimented its graphics and sound. The same website would give the PlayStation version 3.5 out of 5 saying that there was "not much "game" in Play with the Teletubbies, at least not in the conventional sense of the word. But that is exactly what the developers had in mind" but was critical of the interface which he said was "not always obvious to young children." The reviewer for The Sydney Morning Herald was complementary of the faithfulness of the sound and visuals. Gerard Campbell of The Press rated the game five out of ten, writing it "offers little more than what parents can get free by letting their kids watch the television programme, and it is boring", noting his four-year old child became bored after approximately 15 minutes.

Steven Poole, reviewing the PlayStation version for The Guardian, was extremely critical, calling it "a staggeringly incompetent slab of electronic propaganda for two to four-year-olds" Reviewing the PlayStation version, The Northern Echo's reviewer wrote that the game was not likely to develop cult status among students unlike the television series but that "pre-schoolers should see the magic."
