= Strider 2 =

Strider 2 can refer to:

- Strider 2 (1999 video game), a platform video game developed and published by Capcom that is the canon sequel to Strider
- Strider II (1990 video game), a platform video game published by U.S. Gold and non-canon sequel to Strider
