= Noddy and the Birthday Party =

2000 video game

- Developer(s): Tiertex Design Studios
- Publisher(s): BBC Multimedia
- Platform(s): Game Boy Color
- Release: UK: March 24, 2000
- Genre(s): Platform
- Mode(s): Single-player

Noddy and the Birthday Party is a children's video game released only in Europe for the Game Boy Color in 2000. It was developed by Tiertex Design Studios and published by BBC Multimedia. The game is based on the character Noddy by Enid Blyton (specifically the TV series Noddy's Toyland Adventures), as well as the fictional universe in which he resides. The focus of the plot and gameplay is the preparation of the character Big-Ears' upcoming birthday party. The game received mixed to negative reviews from critics.

== Gameplay and plot ==
Big-Ears has an upcoming birthday party. Levels are selected on an overworld map, and Noddy drives his car to various locations in Toyland, the setting of the Noddy universe. In each level, Noddy must find seven items (varying between levels) needed for the party. After each level, the player gains sixpences, which add up to 36 pence by the end of the game, to contribute to the cost of a birthday cake. There are ten levels in all: eight platform levels and two auto-scrolling minigames.

== Reception ==
Noddy and the Birthday Party has received mixed to negative reviews from critics. GameFAQs gave the game a rating of 3.14 out of 5. Several YouTube video game critics have greatly criticized the game for its music, physics, level design, and graphics.
