= Supercross 3D =

1995 video game

- Developer: Tiertex Design Studios
- Publisher: Atari Corporation
- Producers: Dympna Forkin; Faran Thomason; Tom Gillen; Vince Zampella
- Designer: Dympna Forkin
- Programmer: Chris Brunning
- Artist: Barry Armstrong
- Platform: Atari Jaguar
- Release: NA: December 20, 1995; EU: January 1996
- Genre: Racing
- Mode: Single-player

Supercross 3D is a racing video game developed by Tiertex Design Studios for the Atari Jaguar. It was published by Atari Corporation in North America on December 20, 1995, and in Europe in January 1996. In the game, the player controls a dirt bike competing against opponents in motocross races across the United States. It features quick races and a tournament mode, and the player can customize the rider and bike attributes.

Supercross 3D was co-produced by designer Dympna Forkin, along with Atari's Tom Gillen, Faran Thomason, and Vince Zampella. It was one of the first Jaguar titles to use SGI rendering. Critics gave the game unfavorable reviews for its graphics, sound, controls, track design, and frame rate, with little praise for the variety of options and rider customization. Retrospective commentary in the years since its release has been mixed.

== Gameplay ==
The player's rider and a computer-controlled opponent jumping off a large ramp in the San Jose track

Supercross 3D is a three-dimensional motocross racing game where the player controls a dirt bike and the main goal is to finish a race ahead of other seven computer-controlled opponents. Before starting a race, the player can customize the rider's name, nationality, outfit, and team details. Bike features such as tires, suspension, and gears can also be adjusted to suit the needs of each track. There are fourteen tracks spread across various cities in the United States. Each track has a distinct layout, difficulty, and surface type.

The race begins at the starting gate, and the player may incur a penalty if they accelerate before the countdown. The action takes place behind the rider from a third-person perspective. The player drives around the track, managing obstacles such as sharp turns and bumps. The player can perform tricks in the air after jumping from large ramps around the track. If the player goes off course, they will automatically crash and reappear on the track.

There are three different modes of play to choose from at the menu screen: Practice, Race and Tournament. Practice is a training mode where the player races to train their skills to achieve the best possible time and try out tricks. Race is a mode in which the player competes against seven riders in a qualifying round, a semi-final, and a final. The player can select any track in Practice and Race modes, and perform practice laps before racing on them. Tournament is a championship mode covering all fourteen tracks where the player competes against a group of 28 different riders accumulating the most points to win the title. The game saves record lap times on each track, and the player can save their progress in tournament mode after each race and resume it later. There are five difficulty levels and the difficulty of opponents varies depending on the level. There are no multiplayer modes.

== Development and release ==
Supercross 3D was developed by Tiertex Design Studios, which previously ported Flashback (1992) for Atari Jaguar. It was co-produced by designer Dympna Forkin, along with Tom Gillen, Faran Thomason, and Vince Zampella of Atari Corporation. Gillen previously worked as a test department manager before moving into a sports producer role for the Jaguar, while Thomason worked on Jaguar titles such as Cybermorph and Bubsy in Fractured Furry Tales. Zampella previously worked at GameTek before joining Atari to produce Baldies and help launch its PC division, Atari Interactive. Chris Brunning was responsible for the game's programming. Brunning recalled that the Jaguar's digital sound processor (DSP) was complex due to the constant switching of routines in its limited memory, which required writing code in small chunks to load and execute asynchronously. The game's graphic design and animation were done by artist Barry Armstrong. Texture mapping was used for the 3D track models, while the pre-rendered bikes and riders were created using The Advanced Visualizer, making it one of the first Jaguar titles to employ SGI rendering.

Supercross 3D was first announced during an official Atari GEnie roundtable in December 1994, with a planned release date for the third quarter of 1995. The game was demonstrated at Atari during "Fun 'n' Games Day", an event to show upcoming Jaguar titles to the press, and was scheduled for release in September 1995. It was also exhibited during the 1995 Toy Test held by CBS This Morning at the Pacific Science Center. The game made a last-minute appearance at the 1995 ECTS Autumn event due to another title not being ready in time. Atari first published it for the Jaguar in North America on December 20, 1995. A European release followed in January 1996.

== Reception ==
Reception

Review scores
Publication	Score
Computer and Video Games	17/100
M! Games	28%
Next Generation	1/5
Atari Fan	59/100
Atari Gaming Headquarters	6/10
Game Zero Magazine	7.5/50
ST-Computer	33%
ST Magazine	14%
Ultimate Future Games	18%
VideoGames	5/10

Supercross 3D received generally unfavorable reviews. Atari Gaming Headquarters' Patrick Holstine highlighted the game's variety of options, but pointed out its low frame rate, repetitive soundtrack, and lack of arena variety as flaws. Luis Manuel Asensio Royo of Atari Fan said it was a fine game for motocross fans, but found the gameplay to be somewhat slow, the bike's response lacked fluidity, and the sound effects were subpar. VideoGames commended the game for its large, customizable riders, but the irritating gameplay and unimaginative track designs were seen as major negative points.

GamePro criticized Supercross 3D for its cumbersome controls, generic tracks, and poor audio, stating that "After doing the math, even shoddy 16-bit racers like Dirt Trax FX beat this one". German publication ST-Computer commented that the low frame rate and sluggish controls made quick reactions difficult. Martin Gaksch of MAN!AC deemed it a weak off-road motorcycle racer, saying the controls were solid, but faulted its choppy 3D graphics and dull tracks. Next Generation thought the game's tracks were well-designed and the bike customization was well-presented, but the low frame rate, mediocre visuals, and severe slowdown were heavily panned.

Ultimate Future Games criticized the game's jerky frame rate and useless trick system. They also argued that going off track ruined the flow of the race. Computer and Video Games' Ed Lomas faulted the game's overall presentation, awful graphics, and pitiful soundscapes. Evan Morris and Bryan Carter of Game Zero Magazine panned the game's terrible frame rate, lousy visuals, aggravating audio, and controls. Marc Abramson of the French ST Magazine said Supercross 3D was "ten times worse" than Club Drive, citing its pixelated graphics, unwieldy motorcycle, and terrible sound.

Retrospective commentary for Supercross 3D has been mixed. Brett Daly of Jaguar Front Page News (a part of the GameSpy network) commended the game for its impressive graphics, respectable soundscapes, and responsive gameplay, but noted some slowdown during high jumps or instances where there are multiple riders. The Atari Times' Ethan C. Nobles faulted the game for its sparse visuals, lacking audio, frustrating gameplay, and abysmal frame rate. Author Andy Slaven found its graphics, controls, and overall gameplay to be better than average, but felt the choppy frame rate hindered the game. neXGam's Michael Tausendpfund panned the game's jerky visuals, poorly designed tracks, dull gameplay, and unacceptable controls.
