= BBC Multimedia =

Former division of the BBC

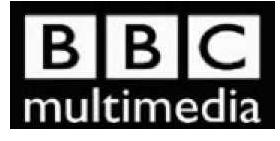
- Founded: 1995; 31 years ago
- Defunct: 2006; 20 years ago
- Headquarters: Broadcasting House, Portland Place, London, United Kingdom
- Products: Doctor Who; Top of the Pops; Robot Wars; Teletubbies; Tweenies; Bob the Builder; Noddy; Pingu; Wallace and Gromit
- Owner: BBC
- Parent: BBC Worldwide
- Subsidiaries: Gamezlab

BBC Multimedia was a division of the BBC which dealt with the publishing of computer-game versions of well-known BBC television programmes.

== History ==
The Multimedia division was founded in 1995 and mostly focused on CD-ROM software for Microsoft Windows and Macintosh.

The company attended E3 2002 by announcing its first game for the Xbox, Robot Wars: Extreme Destruction, set for a November 2002 release, as well as a game adaptation of the CBBC series Ace Lightning for the PlayStation 2, with both games also on Microsoft Windows and Game Boy Advance. Other CD-ROM games announced this time were Bob the Builder: Bob Builds a Park, set for a July 2002 release and Tweenies: Messy Time, set for an October 2002 release.

In July 2002, the company launched a budget range called Favourites, consisting of pre-school games. On 5 November 2002, the company announced a Fimbles CD-ROM for a June 2003 release.

On February 6, 2003, the company announced the Ace Lightning video game for March.

At E3 2003, the company announced a video game based on FightBox for PlayStation 2, Microsoft Windows and Game Boy Advance for a pre-Christmas release window to tie-in with the show's airing. The game adaptation was one of the many side-projects done for the FightBox IP, which was mostly worked on by Runecraft. After the company went out of business, the BBC acquired the developer's offices and some of their staff, and re-structured it under the "Gamezlab" name. The company also showcased their Fimbles CD-ROM, in addition to a game based on Tiny Planets, a Bob the Builder game - Bob's Castle Adventure for a July 2003 release, and an Engie Benjy CD-ROM for a September 2003 release. In October, the company announced the FightBox video game for February 2004. On November 24, the company announced a Balamory CD-ROM for 2004.

In January 2004, Balamory was announced for the following month. A compilation release titled Playtime! was announced. In February, the company announced a video game based on Spooks for the PlayStation 2, Xbox, and Windows, for a late 2004 release window. On 2 November 2004, Global Software Publishing announced acquiring exclusive distribution rights to BBC Multimedia's library. This move was done so BBC Worldwide could refocus BBC Multimedia as a video game licensor instead of being a publisher. Shortly before this, BBC Worldwide closed down Gamezlab and cancelled the upcoming Spooks video game.

BBC Multimedia was closed in 2006 after sales declined in its boxed product business.

== Games ==
Game	Platform(s)	Release date
Attenborough's Antarctic	Windows 3.1 / 95 / 98	1997
Balamory	Windows 95 / 98 / XP	2004
Bill & Ben: Flowerpot Fun!	Windows 95 / 98	2001
BBC Games Collection Featuring Toybox/Playtime	Windows 95 / 98 / XP	2003 / 2005
Blue Peter	Windows 95	1997
Bob the Builder: Bob Builds a Park (Published in North America by THQ)	Windows 98 / Me / XP	2001
Bob the Builder: Bob's Castle Adventure (Published in North America by THQ)	Windows 98 / Me / XP	2003
Bob the Builder: Can We Fix It? (Published in North America by THQ)	Microsoft Windows, PlayStation	2000 / 2001
Bob the Builder: Fix it Fun! (Published in North America by THQ)	Game Boy Color	2000 / 2001
Changing Rooms	Windows 95 / 98	2000
Doctor Who: Destiny of the Doctors	Windows 95	1997
Fast Show Comedy Fun Pack	Windows 95 / 98	1999
Fawlty Towers – Comedy Pack	Windows 95 / 98	2000
Fimbles: Fimbling Fun	Windows 95 / 98 / XP	2003
Gardeners' World Magazine Garden Manager with Alan Titchmarsh	Windows 95 / 98	1998
GCSE Bitesize Revision: Maths	Windows 95 / 98	2000
GCSE Bitesize Revision: Science	Windows 95 / 98	2000
The Human Body – Your Body	Windows 95 / 98	1999
Key Stage 2 ReviseWise Science	Windows 95 / 98	1997
Key Stage 3 Bitesize Revision English	Windows 95 / 98	1999
Key Stage 3 Bitesize Revision Maths	Windows 95 / 98	1999
Live & Kicking: Show Maker	Windows 3.1 / 95 / 98	1995
Mastermind	Windows 3.1 / 95 / 98	1997
Noddy: Let's Get Ready for School! (Released in North America as Noddy: Playtime in Toyland) (Published in North America by Knowledge Adventure)	Windows 95 / 98	1998 (UK) 1999 (US)
Noddy: The Magic of Toytown	Windows 3.1 / 95 / 98	1996
Noddy's Magic Adventure	PlayStation	2000
Noddy and the Birthday Party	Game Boy Color	2000
Only Fools & Horses	Windows 95 / 98	2000
Pingu & Friends	Windows, Macintosh	1999
Pingu: A Barrel of Fun!	Windows 3.1 / 95 / 98	1997
Play with the Teletubbies (Published in North America by Knowledge Adventure)	Windows 95 / 98 / PlayStation	1998 / 2000
Play with the Teletubbies 2: Favourite Games (Published in North America by Knowledge Adventure)	Windows 95 / 98	1999 / 2001
Result: The BBC Sports Quiz presented by Desmond Lynam	Windows 95	1997
Robot Wars: Advanced Destruction (Published in North America by Vivendi Universal Games)	Game Boy Advance	2001
Robot Wars: Metal Mayhem	Game Boy Color	2000
Rotten Ralph – Big Night In	Windows 95 / 98	2000
S Club 7: On The Road	Windows 95 / 98 / Me / 2000 / XP	2003
Shakespeare on CD-ROM: Macbeth	Windows 3.1 / 95 / 98	1995
Shakespeare on CD-ROM: Romeo and Juliet	Windows 3.1 / 95 / 98	1995
SMart	Windows 95 / 98 / NT	2000
Spark Island Adventures in Literacy 7-9	Windows, Macintosh	1997
Spark Island Adventures in Literacy 9-11	Windows, Macintosh	1997
Spark Island Adventures in Maths 7-9	Windows, Macintosh	1997
Spark Island Farmer Rumtums Letter Fun 3-5	Windows, Macintosh	1999
Spark Island Farmer Rumtums Number Fun 3-5	Windows, Macintosh	1999
Spark Island Maths Adventures 9-11	Windows, Macintosh	2001
Spark Island Number Games 5-7	Windows, Macintosh	2001
Spark Island Reading Games 5-7	Windows, Macintosh	2001
Top Of The Pops: Mix Factory	Windows 95 / 98	1998
Top Of The Pops: Mix Factory 2	Windows 95 / 98	1999
Tweenies: Doodles' Bones	Windows 95 / 98, Game Boy Color	2000
Tweenies: Game Time	PlayStation	2001
Tweenies: Messy Time Magic	Windows 95 / 98	2002
Tweenies: Play to the Music	Windows 95 / 98 / Me / XP	2004
Tweenies: Ready to Play	Windows 95 / 98	2000
Wallace & Gromit Crackin' Compendium	Windows 3.1 / 95 / 98	1996
Wallace & Gromit Cracking Animator	Windows 3.1 / 95 / 98	1997
Wallace & Gromit Print-o-matic	Windows 95 / 98	1998
The Weakest Link (published by Activision)	Microsoft Windows, PlayStation, PlayStation 2	2001
Yoho Ahoy: All Aboard!	Windows 98 / 2000	2000

=== Gamezlab ===
Game	Platform(s)	Release date
Robot Wars: Arenas of Destruction (Published in North America by Vivendi Universal Games)	Windows 95 / 98 / 2000 / Me, PlayStation 2	2001
Robot Wars: Extreme Destruction	Windows 95 / 98 / 2000 / Me / XP, Xbox, Game Boy Advance	2002
Ace Lightning	Windows, PlayStation 2	2002
FightBox	Windows, PlayStation 2, Game Boy Advance	2004
Spooks	PlayStation 2, Xbox, Windows	Completely Cancelled

== See also ==
- List of video game publishers
- Lists of video games
