= Olympic Gold (video game) =

- Developer: Tiertex
- Publisher: U.S. Gold
- Platforms: Game Gear, Genesis, Master System
- Release: NA/EU: June 1992
- Genre: Sports
- Modes: Single-player, multiplayer

Olympic Gold is a 1992 sports video game developed by Tiertex Design Studios and published by U.S. Gold for the Sega Mega Drive/Genesis, Master System and Game Gear. Based on the 1992 Summer Olympics in Barcelona, Spain, it was the first officially licensed Olympic video game, receiving approval from the International Olympic Committee.

The game features seven Olympic sporting events, including athletics, swimming, diving and archery. Players can compete against computer-controlled opponents or participate in multiplayer competitions, with three difficulty settings available. Gameplay primarily involves rapid button pressing and timing-based controls.

== Gameplay ==
Olympic Gold is a multi-sport video game based on the 1992 Summer Olympics in Barcelona, Spain. The game features seven Olympic events: the 100 metres, 110 metres hurdles, hammer throw, archery, pole vault, springboard diving and 200 metres freestyle swimming.

Up to four players can compete against computer-controlled athletes, with three modes of play available: Training Session, Mini Olympic Games and Full Olympic Games. Training Session allows players to practise individual events, while Mini Olympic Games permits them to select which events to include in a competition. Full Olympic Games features all seven events in succession. The game also offers three difficulty levels, with increasingly challenging computer-controlled opponents.

Gameplay combines rapid button pressing with timing and precision-based controls. Sprinting and hurdling require players to alternate between buttons to increase their athlete's speed, while swimming also incorporates a stamina system. In the hammer throw and pole vault, players must coordinate their athlete's movements and time their actions. Archery requires adjustments for aiming, bow tension and wind conditions, while diving allows players to perform routines involving different movements and degrees of difficulty.

Players can represent eight nations: France, Great Britain, Germany, Italy, Japan, Spain, the Unified Team and the United States. The game includes opening and closing ceremonies, medal presentations and excerpts from the participating countries' national anthems. Following each event, competitors are ranked in both medal standings and an overall points table. First place receives 24 points, with each subsequent position receiving one fewer point. The game also maintains Olympic and world records, updating them whenever a competitor surpasses an existing record.

In the Master System version, excessively rapid button pressing during the 200-metre freestyle swimming event can cause the athlete to tire and lose speed. The Mega Drive version features eight selectable menu languages, including Portuguese.

== Development and marketing ==
The game was showcased at the Consumer Electronics Show in January 1992. In February 1992, British magazine Sega Pro reported that U.S. Gold planned to release Olympic Gold for the Mega Drive, Master System and Game Gear in time for the Barcelona Olympics. In a June 1992 preview, the magazine identified Dave Stead and Donald Campbell as personnel involved in the Mega Drive version, and Doug Anderson and Chris Brunning in the Master System and Game Gear versions. It listed planned UK retail prices of £39.99, £34.99 and £24.99 for the three versions, respectively.

In Brazil, Tec Toy released Olympic Gold for the Mega Drive, Master System and Game Gear in 1992. Supergame magazine reported in June 1992 that a domestic release of Olympic Gold was planned ahead of the Barcelona Olympics, provided that Tec Toy could secure the necessary rights in time.

In Spain, Sega promoted the Master System version of Olympic Gold through a two-page advertisement in the June 1992 issue of Hobby Consolas. Headlined "Elegidos para la gloria" ("Chosen for Glory"), the advertisement emphasised the game's official licensing for the 1992 Summer Olympics in Barcelona, alongside promotions for Champions of Europe, the official game of UEFA Euro 1992, and Wimbledon.

In the United Kingdom, U.S. Gold sponsored a promotional competition in the August 1992 issue of British magazine Sega Pro, offering a Mega Drive console, branded T-shirts and Olympic Gold badges as prizes.

In France, Sega promoted Olympic Gold through a full-page advertisement in the June 1992 issue of Mega Force, emphasising its official Barcelona Olympics licence and availability for the Mega Drive, Master System and Game Gear. In November 1992, French magazine Mega Force organised an Olympic Gold competition offering more than 60 prizes, including a Mega Drive console bundled with Sonic the Hedgehog and Streets of Rage, and copies of Olympic Gold for Mega Drive, Master System and Game Gear.

The game featured promotional branding from Coca-Cola, whose logo appeared on the European instruction manual alongside the official Barcelona 1992 Olympic emblem.

== Reception ==
In the United Kingdom, Olympic Gold ranked second on the Master System chart and first on the Game Gear chart published by Mean Machines Sega in October 1992. In France, Olympic Gold topped Mega Force magazine's reader-influenced popularity rankings for both the Mega Drive and Master System in September 1992, while the Game Gear version ranked second. The Master System version retained first place in October. In Sweden, Olympic Gold was the sixth-best-selling Mega Drive game of 1992, according to sales rankings supplied by local distributor Brio.

Spanish magazine Hobby Consolas awarded the Mega Drive version of Olympic Gold a score of 91 out of 100 in June 1992. The review praised the game's presentation, animations and recreation of the Olympic events, considering it an impressive adaptation of the Barcelona Games. In Brazil, Supergame reviewed the Mega Drive version in June 1992, awarding it 95 out of 100 for graphics, sound and entertainment, and 90 for challenge. The magazine praised the detailed graphics, stadium atmosphere and sound effects, as well as the presentation of the Olympic opening and closing ceremonies.

British magazine Sega Pro awarded the Game Gear version 79%, praising its animation, colourful stadium backgrounds and sound effects. However, reviewer James Scullion criticised its limited long-term appeal, noting that repeatedly competing in the same seven events became monotonous. He also observed that the British national anthem played during medal presentations regardless of the nationality selected by the player.
