= Index of DOS games (I) =

This is an index of DOS games.

This list has been split into multiple pages. Please use the Table of Contents to browse it.

Title	Released	Developer(s)	Publisher(s)
If It Moves, Shoot It!	1989	Brøderbund Software	Brøderbund Software
Igor: Objective Uikokahonia	1994	Péndulo Studios, S.L.	Dro Soft
I Have No Mouth, and I Must Scream	1995	The Dreamers Guild	Cyberdreams
Ikari Warriors (US version)	1987	Quicksilver Software	Data East
Ikari Warriors (UK version)	1987	Elite Systems	Elite Systems
Ikari Warriors II: Victory Road	1988	Quicksilver Software	Data East
Ikari Warriors III: The Rescue	1989	Quicksilver Software	SNK
Immortal, The	1990	Sandcastle	Electronic Arts
Imperium	1990	The Intelligent Games Co.	Electronic Arts
Imperium Galactica	1997	Digital Reality	GT Interactive
Impossible Mission II	1988	Novotrade	Epyx
Inca	1992	Coktel Vision	Sierra On-Line
Incredible Hulk, The: The Pantheon Saga	1997	Attention to Detail, Silicon Dreams Studio	Eidos Interactive
Incredible Machine, The	1992	Dynamix	Sierra On-Line
The Incredible Machine 2	1994	Sierra On-Line	Sierra On-Line
Incunabula	1984	Avalon Hill	Avalon Hill
Indiana Jones and the Fate of Atlantis	1992	LucasArts	LucasArts
Indiana Jones and the Fate of Atlantis: The Action Game	1992	Attention to Detail	LucasArts
Indiana Jones and the Last Crusade: The Graphic Adventure	1989	LucasArts	LucasArts
Indiana Jones and the Temple of Doom	1989	Mindscape	Mindscape
Indiana Jones in Revenge of the Ancients	1987	Angelsoft	Mindscape
Indianapolis 500: The Simulation	1989	Papyrus Design	Electronic Arts
IndyCar Racing	1993	Papyrus Design	Virgin Interactive
IndyCar Racing II	1995	Papyrus Design	Sierra On-Line
Infestation	1990	Psygnosis	Psygnosis
Infidel	1983	Infocom	Infocom
Infiltrator	1986	Chris Gray Enterprises	U.S. Gold, Mindscape
Infiltrator II	1988	Chris Gray Enterprises	Mindscape
Ingrid's Back	1988	Level 9	Level 9
Inherit the Earth: Quest for the Orb	1994	The Dreamers Guild	New World Computing
Innocent Until Caught	1993	Divide By Zero	Psygnosis
In Pursuit of Greed	1995	Mind Shear Software	Softdisk
In Search of Dr. Riptide	1994	MindStorm Software	Pack Media
In Search of the Most Amazing Thing	1983	Tom Snyder Productions	Spinnaker Software
Inside Trader - The Authentic Stock Trading Game	1987	SoftServ, Inc.	Cosmi Corporation
International Karate	1989	System 3 Software	System 3 Software
International Sensible Soccer	1994	Sensible Software	Renegade Software
International Tennis Open	1992	Infogrames	Philips Interactive Media
Interphase	1989	The Assembly Line	Image Works
Into the Eagle's Nest	1987	Mindscape	Pandora
Into the Void	1997	Adrenalin Entertainment	Playmates Interactive
Iron & Blood: Warriors of Ravenloft	1997	Take-Two Interactive	Acclaim Entertainment
Iron Lord	1989	Ubisoft	Ubisoft
Iron Man / X-O Manowar in Heavy Metal	1996	Real Sports, Realtime Associates	Acclaim Entertainment
Iron Seed	1994	Channel 7	Softdisk
Ishar: Legend of the Fortress	1992	Silmarils	Silmarils
Ishar 2: Messengers of Doom	1993	Silmarils	Silmarils
Ishar 3: The Seven Gates of Infinity	1994	Silmarils	Silmarils
Ishido: The Way of Stones	1990	Publishing International	Accolade
Island of Dr. Brain, The	1992	Sierra On-Line	Sierra On-Line
Island Peril	1996	electric fantasies	Atlantean Interactive Games
Islands of Danger	1990	Carr Software	Carr Software
Isle of the Dead	1993	Rainmaker Software	Merit Software
İstanbul Efsaneleri: Lale Savaşçıları	1996	SiliconWorx	Raks New Media
It Came from the Desert	1991	Level 9	Cinemaware
