= Jeff Spangenberg =

American video game producer

Jeffery Spangenberg is an American retired video game producer and entrepreneur who founded video game developers Punk Development, Iguana Entertainment, Retro Studios, and Topheavy Studios.

== Biography ==
Spangenberg skipped college to learn computer programming, and later served as lead designer and president for Punk Development, the development team of publisher RazorSoft, headquartered in Sunnyvale, California. In 1991, Spangenberg founded his own company in Santa Clara, Iguana Entertainment, and hired 20 staff, including friends of his. Iguana, who would later move to Austin, Texas due to the elevated costs of living in Silicon Valley, wound up bought by Acclaim Entertainment in 1995, and Spangenberg was promoted to an executive position in which he overlooked all of Acclaim's software studios. Spangenberg was fired from Acclaim in 1998, leading him to sue the company for breach of contract and fraud. The suit was settled in 2000.

Following his dismissal, Spangenberg launched a new company, Retro Studios, in October 1998. He then approached Nintendo of America to establish a partnership. Nintendo agreed to fund the studio, hoping the new developer could provide games aimed at mature audiences for their upcoming console, the GameCube, just like Iguana did with the Nintendo 64 game Turok: Dinosaur Hunter. The studio immediately began work on four projects for the GameCube. The Nintendo producer Shigeru Miyamoto was impressed with the studio's Action-Adventure game engine and suggested that Retro could use it to develop a new entry in Nintendo's Metroid series. All projects were eventually cancelled so Retro could focus on Metroid Prime.

On May 2, 2002, months before Prime was released, Nintendo bought out Spangenberg's $1 million worth of Retro Studios, and reclassified the company as a first party developer and division of Nintendo. Spangenberg's departure was attributed to frequent absenteeism and using Retro's servers to host a website that featured pictures of scantily clad women.

Spangenberg next created Topheavy Studios, which developed The Guy Game, released in 2004. It triggered a lawsuit from one of the featured women, who was underage, leading to a temporary injunction prohibiting the further production. The game was re-released as an interactive DVD with the woman's scenes dropped. The Guy Game was the only game developed by Topheavy Studios.

== Credits ==
=== Programming ===
- Advanced Basketball Simulator/Slam-Dunk (1988, Commodore 64)
- Space Harrier (1988, Amiga port)
- After Burner (1989, Amiga port)
- After Burner II (1989, Amiga port)
- Techno Cop (1990, Sega Genesis port)
- Death Duel (1992, Sega Genesis)
- Side Pocket (1993, Super Nintendo Entertainment System port)
- Aero the Acro-Bat (1993, SNES and Genesis)
- NFL Quarterback Club (1994, SNES and Genesis)

=== Producer ===
- Rampart (1991, Master System port)
- Aero the Acro-Bat (1993)
- Zero the Kamikaze Squirrel (1994, SNES and Genesis)
- Aero the Acro-Bat 2 (1994, SNES and Genesis)
- The Pirates of Dark Water (1994, SNES and Genesis)
- NFL Quarterback Club (1994)
- Turok: Dinosaur Hunter (1997, Windows and Nintendo 64)
- The Guy Game (2004, Windows, Xbox and PlayStation 2)
