= Videogame Rating Council =

American rating system

The Videogame Rating Council (V.R.C.) was introduced by Sega of America in 1993 to rate all video games that were released for sale in the United States and Canada on the Master System, Genesis, Game Gear, Sega CD, 32X, and Pico. The rating had to be clearly displayed on the front of the box, but their appearance in advertisements for the video game was strictly optional. It was later supplanted by the industry-wide Entertainment Software Rating Board.

== History ==
As the 16-bit era of video games began in the late 1980s, their content became more realistic. The increased graphical and audio fidelity of the products made violent scenes appear more explicit, especially those containing blood. As controversy stemmed around the realism of this violence, 1992 games Mortal Kombat and Night Trap entered the limelight. Mortal Kombat is a brutal fighting game and Night Trap is a full-motion video Sega CD game where players protect a slumber party from vampires. The games were at the center of federal hearings held from December 9, 1993, to March 4, 1994 by United States senators Joseph Lieberman and Herb Kohl. (Note: Formally, these were the joint hearings between the Subcommittee on Juvenile Justice of the Committee of the Judiciary and the Subcommittee on Regulation and Government Information of the Committee of Governmental Affairs of the 103rd United States Congress.) As a result, the video game industry was given a year to create its own classification system or to otherwise have one imposed on them by the federal government. In May 1993, British censors banned Night Trap from being sold to children under 15 years old in the United Kingdom, which was an influence on Sega's decision to create an age rating system.

Prior to the hearings, Sega had become aware of rumblings from politicians that video game content was being scrutinized. As Sega was preparing to release the controversial Mortal Kombat for the Sega Genesis, the company worked to create its own rating system so that they would be able to market Mortal Kombat as a mature game not intended for children. Sega initially tried to license the Motion Picture Association of America's (MPAA) own rating system, but the MPAA refused. Instead, Sega created its own Videogame Rating Council (VRC) and revealed its existence on May 24, 1993. The council consisted of experts in education, psychology, and sociology as appointed by Sega. The VRC was one of several ratings groups to appear (among them, 3DO's 3DO Rating System). The VRC classified games that worked with Sega's consoles into three categories based on age: GA ("general audiences"), MA-13 ("mature audiences"), and MA-17 ("for adults"). It was criticized by journalists and consumer groups for vagueness and inconsistency, and other companies did not want Sega to be in charge of the ratings organization. This was particularly true for Nintendo, which was in rivalry with Sega in the North American video game market at this time. Nintendo said that the rating system could be used to justify even more violent games. Sega responded by accusing Nintendo of hypocrisy for allowing fighting games such as Street Fighter II on its system. The lead editorial in the January 1994 issue of Electronic Gaming Monthly also criticized Sega for failing to inform and educate the public on the ratings system, particularly noting that the ratings appeared on the game boxes but usually not in advertisements for the games, and that most parents "either haven't a clue as to what [Sega's ratings] mean, don't know that they exist, or don't know why the game got the rating."

Following the hearings, the games industry created the Interactive Digital Software Association in April 1994, which made a proposal for a rating system. Upon the formation of the IDSA, Sega attempted to get the rating system, but it was declined by IDSA member Nintendo, who feared that they did not want to deal with its competitor. The proposal was adopted by the United States Congress in July 1994 and the Entertainment Software Rating Board (ESRB) was founded in September to execute the plan. The VRC ultimately folded that year when replaced by the ESRB. VRC ratings had been used on several hundred games made by Sega and others.

== Ratings ==
The three different ratings were as follows:

Ratings
Symbol	Rating	Descriptor	Content
	GA — General Audiences	Appropriate for all audiences.	No blood or graphic violence. No profanity, no mature sexual themes, and no usage of drugs or alcohol.
	MA-13 — Mature Audiences	Parental Discretion Advised.	The game is suitable for audiences thirteen years of age or older. Game could have some blood in it and more graphic violence than a "GA" game.
	MA-17 — Mature Audiences	Not appropriate for minors.	The game was suitable for audiences seventeen years of age or older. Games could have significant blood, graphic violence, mature sexual themes, profanity, drug or alcohol usage.

== Before the Videogame Rating Council ==
While rival console manufacturer Nintendo enforced strict content guidelines for games released on its hardware in North America, Sega differentiated itself with a more liberal content policy, allowing for the depiction of blood and graphic violence in software released on its home consoles, provided that the publisher label the game's packaging with a generic "Parental Advisory" warning.

Such an advisory was put on the packaging for the following games: Techno Cop, Splatterhouse 2, Death Duel.

However, nudity and other sexual content remained taboo. Games made for Sega systems generally toned down sexual content.

The nude fairies found in Stormlord were given some scantily clad attire when the game was ported over to the Sega Genesis.

Similarly, when Sega localized Phantasy Star II for western consumers, it edited dialogue in the game to obscure a non-playable character's homosexuality.

== Notable cases ==
=== Mortal Kombat ===
The video game company Acclaim brought Mortal Kombat to the Genesis and Super NES in 1993. Both Sega and Nintendo ordered the game's graphic violence and blood to be toned down.

However, Sega allowed the player to restore the controversial content with a secret code, announced the creation of the Videogame Rating Council, and gave Mortal Kombat an MA-13 rating. The result was that the Sega Genesis version of Mortal Kombat outsold the Super NES version. However, the commercial success of the game, including a marketing campaign by Acclaim to prepare consumers for "Mortal Monday", and the fact that the Videogame Rating Council opened the doorway for games to be sold on a Sega console system with adult content promoted national outrage.

All versions of Mortal Kombat and some versions of Mortal Kombat II for Sega systems were brought to Japan with their rating intact in the box art as courtesy of Acclaim's Japanese subsidiary. This marks the first time a rating system was used in Japan, preceding Sega's own, CERO and IARC by a few years.

== Notes and references ==
Notes

Sources

- Budziszewski, P. Konrad (2012). "Entertainment Software Rating Board (ESRB)". In Wolf, Mark J. P. (ed.). Encyclopedia of Video Games: The Culture, Technology, and Art of Gaming. ABC-CLIO. pp. 196–197. ISBN 978-0-313-37936-9.
- Caron, André H.; Cohen, Ronald I. (2013). "7: The History of the Regulation of Video Games". Regulating Screens: Issues in Broadcasting and Internet Governance for Children. McGill-Queen's University Press. pp. 91–94. ISBN 978-0-7735-4210-5.
- Foerstel, Herbert N. (1997). Free Expression and Censorship in America: An Encyclopedia. Greenwood Press.
