= Ace of Aces (video game) =

1986 video game

- Developer: Artech: Paragon Programming (CPC, Spectrum, MSX) Distinctive Software (Atari 8-bit) Nova Game Design (7800) Nexa Corporation (MS-DOS) Tiertex (Master System)
- Publishers: NA: Accolade; EU: U.S. Gold
- Programmer: Stuart Easterbrook
- Artists: Rick Banks; Grant Campbell
- Composer: Greg Mark (MS-DOS)
- Platforms: Commodore 64, Amstrad CPC, ZX Spectrum, MSX, Atari 8-bit, Atari 7800, MS-DOS, Master System
- Release: 1986
- Genre: Combat flight simulator
- Mode: Single-player

Ace of Aces is a combat flight simulation game developed by Artech Digital Entertainment and published in 1986 by Accolade in North America and U.S. Gold in Europe. It was released for the Amstrad CPC, Atari 8-bit computers, Atari 7800, Commodore 64, MSX, MS-DOS, Master System, and ZX Spectrum. Set in World War II, the player flies an RAF Mosquito long range fighter-bomber equipped with rockets, bombs and a cannon. Missions include destroying German fighter planes, bombers, V-1 flying bombs, U-boats, and trains. In 1988, Atari Corporation released a version on cartridge for Atari 8-bit computers styled for the then-new Atari XEGS.

Ace of Aces received mixed reviews, but went on to become one of the best-selling Commodore 64 video games published by Accolade. The game sold 100,000 units.

== Gameplay ==
Gameplay screenshot (Atari 8-bit)

Upon launching the game, a menu screen with options to either practice or partake in a proper mission is shown. If the player decides to do the practice mode, they can choose between dog fight training or a U-boat/train bombing. When playing the practice mode, the enemies are less aggressive. There are five different view options — the cockpit, both left and right wings, the navigational map and the bomb bay — which can be accessed by using the keyboard or by double-tapping the fire button and moving the joystick to the desired direction.

When in missions, the player controls a twin-engined balsa RAF Mosquito which is already airborne, mitigating the necessity of takeoff. When starting a mission, the player chooses what supplies they wish to bring, but the more the player brings, the lower the maximum speed of the plane. At the end of missions, landing is not required and points are awarded according to how many enemies are shot down, along with the amount of unused fuel, bombs, and missiles.

When missions are completed, the player can choose to combine two or more of the other missions to produce a mashup.

== Reception ==
=== Commodore 64 ===
In a 1987 Compute! article, Ace of Aces was noted as Accolade's second best selling Commodore 64 game. Compute!, along with other reviewers, praised the graphics and sound in Ace of Aces. Personal Computer World praised it as "an exciting mixture of strategy and mindless shoot 'em up which includes some of the best graphics seen on the Commodore 64 ... a wholly enjoyable experience". 1991 and 1993 Computer Gaming World surveys of strategy and war games gave it one and a half stars out of five, calling it "somewhat ahistorical". In issue 20 of Zzap!64, the reviewer said it was the best factual war simulation they had played. They compared it to Dambusters and said the playability in this was better. Desert Fox was also used as a comparison, which was referred to as "sometimes unbelievable". An article by the Computer and Video Games magazine published in 1986 said that it was another well-made and well-presented game by Accolade and continued to say that the action-packed gameplay would be able to keep "even the most critical computer pilot busy for some time to come". All four criteria were highly rated, with graphics getting a 10, along with sound, value and playability all getting an 8.

=== Master System ===
The graphics, along with sound and other features which were highly praised in the Commodore 64 version weren't so highly acclaimed in the Master System version. Reviewers commented that there was no sense of excitement when playing the Sega version. In a review on Kultboy, it was given a rating of 20% and said the reasoning behind the low review was because the plane, which is meant to be a fighter plane, flies like a tanker. Comparatively the score for graphics the game was given was high, with 68%. Sega Pro gave the game a rating of 56 and praised the graphics when they were static, but continued on to say they were impractical in-game.

=== Other platforms ===
The ZX Spectrum version was met with reviews disliking the complexity of changing controls and how it may be distracting during a dogfight. In issue 38 of Your Sinclair, reviewers Ben Stone, Paul Sumner and Mike Dunn criticised the difficulty of the game and how the game only contains enough gameplay for a few days. Steve Panak, writing for ANALOG Computing, preferred Ace of Aces to Infiltrator as an Atari 8-bit flight simulator. Atari 7800 Forever only gave a 2.5 out of 5, but ranked it as the best flight simulator for the system.
