= Sweet Cheeks =

Sweet Cheeks may refer to:

== Music ==
- Sweet Cheeks (band), with Lou Bennett
- The Sweet Cheeks, a band that was previously named Crazy 8s
- Sweet Cheeks, 1978 album by Duke Jupiter
- "Sweet Cheeks", a song by J Hus from the 2017 album Common Sense

== Other ==
- Samantha "Sweet-Cheeks" Smith, a character in the video game Island Peril
- Sweet Cheeks, a charity started by snowboarder Hannah Teter
- Shaun Cooper (musician), aka Shaun "Sweet Cheeks" William Cooper
- "Sweet Cheeks" Marie, a character in the video game Police Quest
- Sweet Cheeks Q, a Texas-style barbecue restaurant in Boston's Fenway District owned by Tiffani Faison
