= The Crow: City of Angels (video game) =

1997 video game

- North American PlayStation cover art
- Developer: Gray Matter
- Publisher: Acclaim Entertainment
- Producers: Stefan Posthum; Dan McBride
- Designers: Adam Mock; Calvin Campbell; Stefan Posthuma; Martin J. Bysh
- Programmer: Stefan Posthuma
- Artist: David Duncan
- Composers: Mark Kerr; Nelson Everhart
- Platforms: PlayStation, Sega Saturn, Windows
- Release: PlayStation: NA: February 26, 1997; UK: April 11, 1997; Saturn: EU: February 26, 1997; NA: March 12, 1997; Windows: NA: February 1997; EU: April 1997
- Genre: Beat 'em up
- Mode: Single-player

The Crow: City of Angels is a 1997 beat 'em up video game for Sega Saturn, PlayStation and Microsoft Windows. It is loosely based on the movie of the same title. The player assumes the role of the hero of the film, Ashe Corven. The game was developed by Gray Matter, whose previous game was Perfect Weapon, which The Crow: City of Angels closely resembles in its basic mechanics. It was met with negative reviews.

== Gameplay ==
The gameplay style is similar to a traditional six-directional side-scrolling beat 'em up, viewed from an isometric perspective. All objects and characters are 3D polygonal models, imposed over 2D pre-rendered backgrounds. The game is virtually identical across the three platforms it was released for, the main difference between them being that the PC version has sharper 2D-rendered backgrounds, due to its higher screen resolution.

The protagonist Ashe's primary method of fighting enemies is hand-to-hand combat, consisting of basic punches and kicks. He also has the ability to pull off more acrobatic moves using various button combinations. Along the way various weapons can be found, including knives, bottles, handguns and shotguns. In addition to their normal usage, all of the weapons can be thrown at enemies to cause damage. During the course of the game, Ashe encounters various bosses (the main villains from the film).

The game contains a tribute to Brandon Lee; if the player beats the game in under 50 minutes and presses the Triangle button on the credits screen, a crow will fly towards the screen then morph into a picture of Lee.

== Plot ==
The game follows the same plot of the film on which it is based: mechanic Ashe Corven and his son Danny are brutally murdered by a gang. Resurrected by a crow and acquiring supernatural powers with the help of artist and new friend Sarah, Ashe now seeks vengeance on his murderers, including "the ninjitsu death-bitch" Kali and the drug king Judah.

== Development ==
Acclaim originally planned for the game to be released early in the fourth quarter of 1996, in order to tie in with the August release of the film on which it is based.

All of the characters in the game were animated with Acclaim's motion capture technology.

== Reception ==
Reception

Review scores
Publication	Score
GameSpot	3.9/10 (PS1)
IGN	1.0/10 (PS1)
Next Generation	1/5 (PS1)
PC Gamer (US)	32% (WIN)
Sega Saturn Magazine	67% (SAT)

The Crow: City of Angels was almost universally panned upon its release. The PlayStation version has a GameRankings score of 23.5% based on four reviews. Critics widely praised the 3D rendered backgrounds, agreeing that they were both technologically cutting edge and lent a moody, haunting atmosphere to the game. However, esteem for the visuals was outweighed by criticism of the controls, which reviewers found suffered from delayed responsiveness and made it difficult to make the player character face the desired direction. Most found that the frequent changing of the fixed camera angles and poor collision detection added to the confusion and frustration of the basic gameplay. Some critics additionally felt that the beat 'em up genre as a whole was too limited by the standards of the current gaming generation. Jeff Kitts from GameSpot explained, "There are no objectives, tasks, or missions to complete - just walk around and punch bad guys. Big fun (note the sarcasm)."

The voice clips, though regarded as a lesser issue, were generally ridiculed as featuring weak dialogue, mediocre acting, poor quality production, and a limited selection of clips (which leads to multiple enemies repeating the same lines). Colin Williamson commented in PC Gamer US that the clips "sound like they were recorded by programmers screaming into a five-dollar Radio Shack microphone".

According to Scary Larry of GamePro, "This dark, moody game may appeal to certain Gen Xers looking for a slow-paced violent game. The rest of us, however, are going to be turned off by the awkward, choppy movements of the sprites, asinine gameplay, and horrible graphics." Sega Saturn Magazine's Lee Nutter said it was "Not a bad effort of a game by Acclaim's usual standards but certainly not a wise purchase." Williamson called it "the worst movie license fighting game since Expect No Mercy." A Game Revolution reviewer went on to say: "The Crow: City of Angels is one of the worst titles I've ever seen. Avoid all contact with this game." IGN rated the game 1.0 out of 10, their lowest possible score. A Next Generation critic said the game's problems were so great that it seemed nowhere near the end of its development cycle.

Electronic Gaming Monthly named The Crow: City of Angels both Worst Movie to Game and Worst Intro in their 1998 Video Game Buyer's Guide. They acknowledged that the opening cinematic had some cool graphic effects, but said the unintentionally humorous dialogue, poor lip-synching, and awkward, over-exaggerated animation were enough to merit the "worst" title. It was included among the 100 worst games of all time by GamesRadar in 2014.
