= B.O.B. (video game) =

1993 video game

- Developers: Gray Matter (SNES); Foley Hi-Tech Systems (Genesis)
- Publisher: Electronic Arts
- Designers: Christopher Gray; Dennis Turner; Ed Zolnieryk
- Programmers: Christopher Gray; Ed Zolnieryk
- Artist: Dennis Turner
- Composers: Michael Bartlow (SNES); Lx Rudis (Genesis)
- Platforms: Super NES, Genesis
- Release: Super NES: NA: June, 1993; PAL: July 22, 1993; JP: December 22, 1993; Genesis: PAL: August 1993; NA: September 1993; JP: November 19, 1993
- Genre: Run and gun
- Mode: Single-player

B.O.B. (known in Japan as Space Funky B.O.B.) is a run and gun video game for the Genesis and Super Nintendo Entertainment System. It was published by Electronic Arts in 1993. A sequel, B.O.B. II, was in development but never released.

== Gameplay ==
Side-scrolling gameplay in B.O.B.

The player can choose from a wide variety of weapons and gadgets called "remotes", each with their own ammunition or stock. Use of remotes, such as a trampoline or helicopter, is necessary to complete some stages. A punch is also available when ammunition for B.O.B.'s gun runs out, or if the player wishes to conserve it. There is a time limit on every stage and once it runs out the player's health quickly drains until they lose a life.

B.O.B. uses the same game engine as the Wayne's World video game, also developed by Gray Matter. Elements of the shooting, jumping, and boss battles are very similar between the two games.

== Plot ==
When B.O.B. crashes his dad's space car on the way to pick up his date, he finds himself stranded on a hostile asteroid filled with enemies. By collecting Thiagotches and using fast reflexes, B.O.B. tries to find his way off the asteroid and to his date. B.O.B. fights his way through three strange worlds in total, encountering several particularly enormous or swift enemies (bosses) along the way, and participating in several cart-race levels. There were several different types of setting for each level, including domed space colony cities, large alien hive-type areas, strange biomechanical facilities, ancient (and apparently haunted) temples and cavernous magma chambers. Some of these settings only appeared on certain worlds.

At the end of each world, B.O.B manages to discover a new space-car to allow him to continue on his journey. The first two both fail him under comical circumstances, resulting in him becoming trapped on an entirely new alien world. With the final car, B.O.B. is at last able to meet up with his date, who is revealed to be a large, blue female robot with a huge mouth, who harshly berates B.O.B. for his tardiness. As she is yelling at him, a slender red female robot flies past them on a space surfboard. B.O.B., frustrated with his obnoxious date, declares "That's the girl for me!" and drives off in pursuit of the red female. The game ends with a shot of B.O.B. and his new date sitting on a small asteroid together, staring out at the beauty of the cosmos in silence. Behind them, B.O.B.'s car (in the backseat of which his date had stashed her surfboard) stalls and drifts off into space, presumably leaving them stranded together.

== Development ==
B.O.B. was developed by Gray Matter and Foley Hi-Tech Systems, and published by Electronic Arts for both the Super NES and Genesis. The cover art for the EA packaging was illustrated by Marc Ericksen.

In August 2006, GameSpot reported that Electronic Arts would be also porting B.O.B. to the PlayStation Portable as part of EA Replay. It was released in North America on November 7, 2006.

On September 12, 2008, the source code of the SNES version was found on a hard drive bought on eBay.

== Reception ==
Reception

Aggregate score
Aggregator	Score
GameRankings	66.25% (SNES)

Super Gamer gave B.O.B. an overall review score of 60%.
