= Into the Void =

Into the Void may refer to:

- Into the Void (video game), a 1997 strategy game
- "Into the Void" (Black Sabbath song), 1971
- "Into the Void" (Nine Inch Nails song), 1999
- "Into the Void", a song by Kiss, from the album Psycho Circus
- Into the Void, a 1991 Spelljammer novel by Nigel Findley
- "Into the Void" (The Flash), an episode of The Flash

== See also ==
- Enter the Void, a 2009 film
