= Whirlinurd =

1985 video game

- Developer: Chris Gray Enterprises
- Publisher: U.S. Gold
- Designer: Chris Gray
- Platforms: Atari 8-bit, Commodore 64
- Release: 1985
- Genre: Platform

Whirlinurd is a platform game designed by Chris Gray and published by U.S. Gold in 1985 for the Atari 8-bit computers and Commodore 64. The previous game co-designed by Chris Gray was the 8-bit hit Boulder Dash.

== Gameplay ==
Gameplay screenshot (Atari 8-bit)

The player controls one of the four Nurds and must complete 50 rooms filled with obstacles, collecting food along the way. Each level has different obstacles (such as snakes, bugs, or bouncing balls) that must be avoided, or the player will lose one of three lives. The player-controlled Nurd can fly using the propellers on its head, but if the Nurd touches a wall or platform, it floats back to the ground and cannot fly until it touches solid land. In each room, the player must collect four pieces of food before he can proceed to the next level.

== Reception ==
Whirlinurd received mixed reviews, many of which highlighted the game's derivativeness. Your Commodore reviewer concluded: "I found this game quite challenging to play, but I can't say that it was more exciting than the host of other games in the same vein." A Commodore User reviewer agreed: "Whirlinurd is pretty standard stuff really and very similar in concept, though not detail, to umpteen other obstacle games".
