= Super R.B.I. Baseball =

1995 video game

- Developer: Gray Matter
- Publisher: Time Warner Interactive
- Producers: Chris Gray; Bill Hindorff
- Designer: Mike Klug
- Programmer: Derek Dick
- Artists: Sean Sullivan; Mike D'Agnillo; Nick Gray; David Duncan
- Composer: Andy Armer
- Series: R.B.I. Baseball
- Platform: Super Nintendo Entertainment System
- Release: NA: June 1995
- Genre: Sport
- Modes: Single-player, multiplayer

Super R.B.I. Baseball is a baseball video game developed by Gray Matter and published by Time Warner Interactive. It was released for the Super Nintendo Entertainment System in 1995 exclusively in North America.

== Gameplay and background ==
A cheering crowd helps to add realism into this game.

The game is officially licensed by the Major League Baseball Players Association, offering 700 actual baseball players from the 1994 Major League Baseball season in addition to 28 unlicensed teams. There are six modes to play: exhibition, Home Run Derby, defense practice, playoffs, league (in which teams play every other team in succession just like in NBA Jam), and Game Breaker (which allows players to change the course of Major League Baseball history).

The realistic-styled stadiums are contrasted with the cartoon-like graphics, but the stadiums are altered from their MLB counterparts due to copyright issues. Jack Buck provides a play-by-play analysis of the action.

== Reception ==
The video game review magazines of the mid-1990s gave this game mixed reviews. GamePro highly praised the game's selection of options and stats and the clearly detailed, comical graphics. However, they described the controls as poor, with both a confusing configuration and slow reactions to button presses. They concluded: "With more features than any other baseball cart, Super RBI should've been serious competition for excellent games like World Series Baseball. Too bad the controls undercut that potential".
