= Aero the Acro-Bat 2 =

1994 video game

- SNES cover art by Greg Martin
- Developer: Iguana Entertainment
- Publishers: Sunsoft: NS, PS, XB; WW: Ratalaika Games
- Directors: Nigel Cook; Carl Wade
- Producers: David Siller; Jeff Spangenberg
- Designer: Nigel Cook
- Programmers: Richard Cowie; Carl Wade; Iguana UK
- Composer: Rick Fox (as Fox Productions)
- Platforms: Super NES; Sega Genesis; Nintendo Switch; PlayStation 4 PlayStation 5 Xbox One; Xbox Series X/S
- Release: November 1994: Super NES; NA: November 1994; PAL: August 1995 Genesis; NA: November 1994; EU: July 1995 Switch, PS4, PS5, Xbox One, Series X/S; WW: September 6, 2024
- Genre: Platform
- Mode: Single-player

Aero the Acro-Bat 2 (Note: Japanese: エアロ ザ アクロバット 2, Hepburn: Earo Za Akurobatto Tsuu) is a platform game developed by Iguana Entertainment, and published by Sunsoft as the sequel of Aero the Acro-Bat. It was released for the Sega Genesis and Super Nintendo Entertainment System in November 1994. The game is dedicated to Brazilian racer Ayrton Senna, who died in a crash during a Grand Prix.

David Siller planned to port and remake the game for Game Boy Advance in 2002, but then cancelled it in favor of original titles. The Super NES version was re-released for the Wii Virtual Console in the PAL region on August 6, 2010, and in North America on September 20. Ratalaika Games re-released the game in September 2024 for Nintendo Switch, PlayStation 4, PlayStation 5, Xbox One, and Xbox Series X/S.

== Plot ==
The story starts directly after the events of the original game, where Aero had knocked Edgar Ektor off of the highest tower of his Museum of Horrors. After knocking him off, Aero leaves to explore Ektor's museum, finding a magician's box which brings him to an ancient castle. Meanwhile, unbeknownst to Aero, Ektor's henchman Zero the Kamikaze Squirrel manages to save him before he hits the ground, and Ektor tells Zero to prepare a 'Plan B'.

== Gameplay ==
The game is split into eight worlds, all of them except for the final world with three 'acts' each. The levels are significantly longer than the first game and they are designed in a similar way with many secret areas. There are no objectives, as well as a timer. The goal of each level is to find the exit at the end of every act, defeating enemies and collecting power-ups along the way.

Aero keeps his drill jump from the first game, an ability that can be aimed either diagonally up or down to reach enemies and platforms. New to this game is the ability to aim the drill jump straight down, allowing Aero to attack enemies directly below him. Food can be collected for extra points, and stars can be thrown at enemies to defeat them, much like in the original game. There are also four hidden letters in each act that spell the word 'AERO'. Finding all four letters will unlock a cup-switching game (it can also be played in the Options Menu) at the end of the act where an extra life can be earned.

== Development ==
Sunsoft made use of SGI technology to render the backgrounds of the game.

== Release ==
The game was shown at 1994 Summer Consumer Electronics Show in Chicago.

Sunsoft aided by the Spanish company Spaco released the game in Spain along with Zero the Kamikaze Squirrel and Hebereke's Popoon for Christmas 1994.

== Reception ==
Reception

Aggregate score
Aggregator	Score		
Aggregator	Sega Genesis	SNES	Wii
GameRankings	77.50%	75.00%	N/A

Review scores
Publication	Score		
Publication	Sega Genesis	SNES	Wii
Electronic Gaming Monthly	7.75/10	N/A	N/A
GameFan	N/A	285 / 300	N/A
IGN	N/A	N/A	7/10
Next Generation	3/5	N/A	N/A
Nintendo Life	N/A	N/A	8/10

Reviewing the Genesis version, GamePro raved that "Aero 2 outclasses the original with a new, dark theme that shows off some truly superb graphics, new and improved moves and techniques, and better play control". They also praised the game's huge levels and numerous secrets, and singled out the Drop Drill as the best of the new moves. Electronic Gaming Monthly described it as a solid and satisfying sequel to the original, citing good graphics, numerous techniques, large levels, and ingeniously designed secret areas. They gave it a 7.75 out of 10. Next Generation concurred that the graphics, levels, and techniques all add up to very solid gaming, but criticized both Aero games for being severely lacking in originality.

Nintendo Life gave the Virtual Console release of the Super NES version an 8 out of 10, declaring it "a much more varied and playable platforming experience" than the original Aero the Acro-Bat. They specifically noted the improved controls and graphics and the more varied level designs and musical tracks, and added that the game is "every bit as much fun to play now on the Virtual Console service as it was fifteen years ago on the Super Nintendo console".

== See also ==
- Zero the Kamikaze Squirrel
