= World Cup Golf: Hyatt Dorado Beach =

- Developer: Arc Developments
- Publishers: U.S. Gold: NA: Eidos Interactive (PlayStation, Saturn); JP: Soft Vision
- Platforms: MS-DOS, 3DO, CD-i, PlayStation, Saturn
- Release: MS-DOS, 3DO, CD-i; December 1994; PlayStation, Saturn; January 1996: JP: March 1996
- Genre: Sports
- Modes: Single-player, multiplayer

World Cup Golf: Hyatt Dorado Beach is a sports video game developed by Arc Developments and published by U.S. Gold. It is based on the 1994 event set at Dorado Beach in Puerto Rico. Conceived as the most technologically advanced and realistic golf simulation ever, the game was built using Silicon Graphics workstations exclusively for platforms supporting the CD-ROM format. It was initially released on MS-DOS, 3DO, and CD-i in 1994. Conversions were released as World Cup Golf: Professional Edition for PlayStation and Saturn in 1996. Versions for the Sega CD and CD32 were cancelled. The game received a mixed reaction from critics.

== Gameplay ==
World Cup Golf: Hyatt Dorado Beach is a game set in the golf course on the Dorado Beach of Puerto Rico.

== Development ==
World Cup Golf: Hyatt Dorado Beach was produced by the British studio Arc Developments and published by U.S. Gold. Arc was previously responsible for Nick Faldo's Championship Golf in 1992. Following the publisher's World Cup Soccer titles, U.S. Gold acquired the World Cup Golf license, basing the new game on the 1994 event set at Dorado Beach in Puerto Rico. World Cup Golf was conceived as the most realistic and technologically advanced golf simulation to date, restricting development only on platforms that utilized the CD-ROM format. Producer Steve Hickman explained, "We have had to store an enormous amount of images and the non-CD based hardware currently available is just not far enough advanced. CD has allowed us to achieve this plus a lot more."

Cover of the North American PlayStation Professional Edition

Hickman said that the design team created a digital replica of the real course's topography using a recent survey and over one thousand photographs taken in a two-day period. Visuals were rendered and texture mapped using Silicon Graphics workstations running Wavefront animation software. A number of stand-alone workstations dedicated to building a 3D model of each hole. Between 300 and 500 images were rendered around each hole to create "backdrops for the game itself," Hickman further explained. Golfer sprites were digitized while each swing would feature a short, 60-frame full-motion video of the ball's flyby to the hole.

== Release ==
The game was released for MS-DOS, 3DO, and CD-i in December 1994. Versions for Sega CD and Amiga CD32 were also reported but ultimately cancelled. In addition, more courses were planned as separate disk releases, including Runaway Bay, Jamaica; Mission Hills, Thailand; and Mission Hills, China. However, Hyatt Dorado remained the only location in the final build. The game was later ported to PlayStation and Sega Saturn as World Cup Golf: Professional Edition, which was built off the original rendition with eight months of additional fine-tuning to its graphics and gameplay. The Professional Edition was released in western regions in January 1996 and distributed in Japan in March of that year.

== Reception ==
Reception

Review scores
Publication	Score
Electronic Gaming Monthly	14/20 (3DO)
Famitsu	23/40 (SAT)
Game Players	73% (SAT)
GamePro	4/5 (3DO)
IGN	5/10 (PS)
Mean Machines Sega	68/100 (SAT)
Next Generation	2/5 (3DO); 3/5 (SAT)
PC Format	65% (DOS)
PC Games (DE)	80% (DOS)
3DO Magazine	4/5 (3DO)
CD-i Magazine	87% (CD-i)
Génération 4	69% (DOS)
Maximum	2/5 (SAT)
Play	71% (PS)
Sega Saturn Magazine	68% (SAT)
SuperJuegos	81/100 (CD-i); 79/100 (PS)
VideoGames	5/10 (3DO)

World Cup Golf: Hyatt Dorado Beach and its subsequent Professional Edition received mixed reviews. Next Generation gave the 3DO version two stars out of five and stated, "Those people in search of a decent golf title should probably look for a game that's a little less demanding." The magazine gave the Saturn version three stars out of five, and stated, "The only real drawback to the game is that there is only one course available for play. It seems almost a shame to create such enjoyable gameplay and then only offer one course on which to enjoy it."
