= Championship Hockey =

1992 video game

- Developer(s): Electronic Arts
- Publisher(s): U.S. Gold
- Platform(s): Master System, Game Gear
- Release: Master System: EU: May 1995; Game Gear: EU: June 1995
- Genre(s): Sports
- Mode(s): Single-player, multiplayer

Championship Hockey is a 1995 ice hockey video game that was released exclusively for the European Master System and Game Gear.

== Gameplay ==
Players play international ice hockey matches against 22 of the world's most powerful ice hockey playing nations.

There is a bird's eye view that allows players to get a wider scope of the game being played. Players can choose between 5, 10, or 20-minute periods. Penalties can be enabled; with all of them netting two minutes in the penalty box. There are no major penalties or game misconducts in this video game. Players can participate in an exhibition game, a regular season-style endeavor, or through a "best of 7" playoff series.

Teams included in the game include: Belgium, Canada, Czechoslovakia, Denmark, Finland, France, Germany, Hungary, Iceland, Italy, Luxembourg, Netherlands, Norway, Poland, Portugal, Russia, Spain, Sweden, Switzerland, United Kingdom and the United States.
