= WWF King of the Ring (video game) =

1993 video game

- NES cover art featuring Bret Hart; inset photos featuring Mr. Perfect vs. Razor Ramon, Lex Luger and Hulk Hogan
- Developers: Gray Matter; Eastridge Technology
- Publisher: LJN
- Programmer: Nick Eastridge
- Composers: Scott Marshall (Title Screen Music), Nick Eastridge (Arrangements)
- Platforms: Nintendo Entertainment System, Game Boy
- Release: Game Boy: NA: September 1993; EU: 1994; JP: March 25, 1994; NES: NA: November 1993; EU: 1993
- Genres: Fighting, sports
- Modes: Single-player, multiplayer

WWF King of the Ring is a professional wrestling video game based on the World Wrestling Federation (WWF), released in 1993 for the Game Boy and Nintendo Entertainment System. It was the final WWF game released for the NES, and third WWF game released for the Game Boy.

In this game, players can vie for the title of King of the Ring by competing in an eight-man single elimination tournament. Additionally, players can battle the entire roster through a string of singles matches to become WWF Champion. Also available are exhibition matches in singles and tag team modes for one or two players.

== Gameplay ==
The NES version features eleven wrestlers: Hulk Hogan, Randy Savage, Bret Hart, The Undertaker, Shawn Michaels, Razor Ramon, Bam Bam Bigelow, Yokozuna, Mr. Perfect, Lex Luger, and "You" (a generic wrestler that the player can name and assign attributes for). Undertaker and Bigelow are not in the Game Boy version.

Each of the game's wrestlers possess the same basic moveset, consisting of punches, kicks, a body slam, a suplex, a throw, a dropkick, stomps, elbow drops, and a move off the turnbuckle. There are no signature moves, but each wrestler varies in speed, strength, and stamina attributes.

== Development ==
WWF King of the Ring was the last NES/GB game made by Gray Matter.

== Reception ==
In North America, the Game Boy version sold 90,144 units and grossed $2,704,320 while the NES version sold 4,885 units and grossed $2,192,460, for a total of 95,029 units sold and $4,896,780 revenue.

=== Critical reception ===
Reception

Review scores
Publication	Score
Famitsu	GB: 6/10, 5/10, 5/10, 4/10
M! Games	GB: 65%
Video Games (DE)	GB: 68% NES: 56%
Electronic Games	GB: 69%

When the NES version was released, Electronic Gaming Monthly gave the review scores of 8, 6, 6, and 7 out of 10. Ed Semrad, who gave the highest score, wrote: "...There are lots of wrestlers to pick from, each being quite different from the other. Being only a two-button game does not really hinder it from being fun, but being on an 8-bit system does have its limitations -- like the occasional character [having his] legs disappearing when thrown...". Sushi-X wrote: "...The graphics are weak and lots of flicker gets annoying real fast. The game play is decent and the cart proves to be fun with two players".

== See also ==
- List of licensed wrestling video games
- List of fighting games
