= The Guy Game =

2004 video game

- NTSC PlayStation 2 cover
- Developer: Topheavy Studios
- Publisher: Gathering
- Director: Jeff Spangenberg
- Producer: Jeff Spangenberg
- Designers: Jeff Spangenberg; Matt Sadler; Matt Bearden; Steve Williams; Zachary Bolena
- Programmer: Steve Williams
- Artist: Zachary Bolena
- Writer: Matt Sadler
- Composer: Charlie Wan
- Platforms: PlayStation 2, Xbox, Windows
- Release: PlayStation 2, Xbox: NA: August 31, 2004; Windows: NA: December 22, 2004
- Genre: Party
- Modes: Single-player, multiplayer

The Guy Game is a 2004 adult video game developed by Topheavy Studios and published by Gathering for Windows, PlayStation 2, and Xbox. Presented in a trivia gameshow style, it allows up to four players to compete by completing multiple choice questions and minigames complemented by filmed live-action footage of young women in bikinis on spring break.

Its development was led by the former Metroid Prime (2002) developer Jeff Spangenberg, who sought to create an interactive game with appeal to men inspired by the Girls Gone Wild series of pornographic videos. The objective of the game is for players to earn points, as well as accumulate bonus points for a meter, titled the Flash-O-Meter, that progressively removes censorship of footage of the women exposing their breasts. Upon release, The Guy Game was a commercial disappointment and received negative reviews, with critics critiquing its tastelessness, slow pace, and lack of content, although some praised it as a niche party title for a college-age audience.

The Guy Game drew controversy when a participant filmed exposing her breasts sued the developer and publishers for breach of privacy and emotional distress, and revealed that she was a minor at the time of filming. Her lawsuit successfully obtained a temporary injunction against further distribution, after which Topheavy Studios ceased further sales. Due to the ESRB classification of The Guy Game as 'Mature' instead of 'Adults Only', authors, groups and legislators in the United States targeted it in efforts to restrict minors' access to explicit video games. The Guy Game has been retrospectively assessed as a controversial entry in an emergent genre of adult video games receiving a mainstream commercial release on consoles in the mid-2000s in line with other entries including Leisure Suit Larry: Magna Cum Laude (2004) and Playboy: The Mansion (2005).

== Gameplay ==
Gameplay features rounds of Ballz minigames that contribute to the overall score of players.

The Guy Game is a trivia game in which up to four players answer multiple choice quizzes and complete minigames in a series of 'episodes' that feature a progression of four rounds. Most gameplay is complemented by full motion video of comedian Matt Sadler asking trivia questions provided to the player to bikini-clad young women ('Hotties') on spring break. Players have dual objectives of earning enough points to reach the highest rank of competing players, and earn bonus points that add to a points pool named the Flash-O-Meter. In the full motion video footage, Hotties are expected to flash their breasts on camera if they answer the questions incorrectly. As players contribute to the Flash-O-Meter, footage of Hotties flashing the camera becomes less censored, starting from fully censored at 'Soft and Squishy', pixelated at 'Sorta Chubby', and uncensored at 'Super Stiff'. At the start of a round, players select a 'Cheerleader' avatar who reacts to their performance, progressively losing their clothes if the player earns points, and putting on their clothes if they answer incorrectly.

The first quiz round, 'Foreplay', is a multiple choice quiz in two sections. Firstly, players answer a multiple choice question, with more points earned the sooner a correct answer is made. Incorrect answers disappear from the multiple choice over time, at the cost of fewer points being earned. Secondly, players earn bonus points and contribute to the Flash-O-Meter by guessing if the Hottie answered the question correctly or incorrectly. The second round, titled 'Ballz', features interactive variations of skeeball (Ballz Shotz), Pong (Ballz In) and a game where players attempt to knock each other's rolling balls off of a platform (Ballz Out). The third round, 'TitWitz', is similar to 'Foreplay', except players are tasked to guess which of two incorrect answers was given by a Hottie in response to a question. If the Flash-O-Meter is sufficiently filled, players enter a fourth round, 'Hottie Challenge', where they can bet their points on one of several Hotties filmed completing a physical challenge. At the end, the player with the most points wins. In multiplayer rounds, players are ranked between 'President', 'Vice President', 'Treasurer' and 'Asshole', with the highest ranking position of 'President' having additional privileges including the ability to choose additional rules in a round, with the intent implied that violating the rules requires losing players to take a drink.

== Development and release ==
The Guy Game was the first and only video game developed by Topheavy Studios, founded by lead developer Jeff Spangenberg in 2002. Spangenberg created the studio after his previous company, Retro Studios, which had developed Metroid Prime, was acquired by Nintendo in May 2002. Spangenberg stated that the title and concept of The Guy Game was based around creating "a game geared toward guys about things guys like: competing against your buddies, showing up your buddies and topless nudity". It was inspired by Girls Gone Wild, a direct-to-video pornographic series with a similar premise. Footage was shot on South Padre Island during the 2003 spring break season. The Guy Game featured Matt Sadler, a comedian who had previously appeared on MTV and in a national talent search on HBO. The budget for The Guy Game was estimated by Spangenberg to total $1.4 million. Atomic Planet Entertainment developed the PlayStation 2 conversion. Topheavy Studios previewed it in January 2004 in search of a publisher, with Take-Two Interactive subsidiary Gathering announcing a deal in July 2004 to publish it. The Guy Game was shipped for release on the PlayStation 2 and Xbox on August 31. A Windows version followed on December 22.

=== Controversy ===
==== Rating and censorship ====
Upon release, The Guy Game received a 'Mature' rating from the ESRB, falling short of an 'Adults Only' classification that would have seen its sale restricted from minors. The Guy Game was cited by several groups and legislators in the United States seeking greater restriction of distribution of sexually explicit video games to minors. In 2004, the National Institute on Media and the Family advised parents that The Guy Game was a 'game to avoid' in its Ninth Annual Video Game Report Card. In December 2004, Illinois Governor Rod Blagojevich introduced legislation that restricted retailers from selling or renting violent or sexually explicit video games to minors. The Guy Game was one of two sexually explicit titles identified for restriction, along with Leisure Suit Larry: Magna Cum Laude, citing its "nudity" and "raunchy exchanges". Illinois legislators submitted footage of The Guy Game in an unsuccessful defense of its legislation in a 2006 lawsuit by the Entertainment Software Association. In March 2005, Michigan Governor Jennifer Granholm showcased footage of The Guy Game in support of a campaign for increased restrictions on violent and sexually explicit video games, lobbying to the Michigan legislature that Michigan law did not prevent minors from renting or purchasing it. Author Pamela Paul, who argued that The Guy Game was indicative of a greater presence of pornographic content in media targeted to adolescents, appeared before a 2005 U.S. Senate Hearing on pornography, testifying that it did "not even get an adults-only rating" and evidenced how video games "exult the pornographic".

The Guy Game is explicitly banned from streaming on the game streaming site Twitch.

==== Topheavy Studios v. Doe ====
In December 2004, an anonymous plaintiff ('Doe') initiated legal proceedings against Topheavy Studios and the publishers, requesting an injunction to discontinue the release of The Guy Game. Doe, a participant filmed exposing her breasts in The Guy Game, was a seventeen-year-old minor at the time of filming the segments. Doe had been approached by a representative to participate in The Guy Game and had given producers a fake identification card and inconsistent information on her media release. Upon its release, Doe was told by her brother that The Guy Game depicted images of her topless and was not aware her likeness was used in the game, its promotional material or website. Doe pursued a lawsuit for relief for invasion of privacy, negligence, and emotional distress. Her counsel argued that she was not able to consent to appear in The Guy Game, rendering her release form void, and that the publishers had misappropriated her likeness by failing to discover her age despite inaccuracies in her release form and proceeding to publish the footage. In rebuttal, counsel for Topheavy Studios argued that Doe had entered and participated in the contest willingly and made fraudulent representations about her age to the production team, making it reasonable for the studios to have treated her as an adult. The injunction restraining distribution of The Guy Game was granted at trial in January 2005, and successfully upheld by Doe at appeal to the Texas Third District Court of Appeal in August 2005. The trial and appeal did not resolve the question as to whether Topheavy had produced child pornography in violation of obscenity laws under the Texas Penal Code; the Court of Appeal held the injunction was not necessarily issued on this basis in coming to a finding that the injunction was not confined to that jurisdiction. Following the injunction, Topheavy Studios ceased distribution of The Guy Game, protesting on their website that "the Man has decided that our fun and hilarious presentation of spring break revelry just wasn't appropriate for the world of gaming".

== Reception ==
Reception

Aggregate score
Aggregator	Score
Metacritic	PS2: 48/100; XBOX: 47/100

Review scores
Publication	Score
AllGame	3/5
Electronic Gaming Monthly	2.5/30
Game Informer	3/10
GameSpot	7.5/10
GameSpy	PS2: 1/5
IGN	7.7/10 (Note: Perry's review was removed from IGN in 2020 after the revelation of one of the participants being a minor at the time of filming.)
Official U.S. PlayStation Magazine	1/5
PC Gamer (US)	20%
PlayStation: The Official Magazine	3.0/10
TeamXbox	7.3/10
GMR	XBOX: 3/10
Xbox Nation	0/10

=== Sales ===
The Guy Game was a commercial disappointment, selling a combined 60,000 copies in 2004 on Xbox and PlayStation 2. Spangenberg claimed it sold well in 2004, and estimated sales by 2005 to have totalled between 60 and 80,000 units, although provided no evidence during the Doe lawsuit on profits or projected sales. Chris Morris of CNN cited The Guy Game as an example of a trend of commercially unsuccessful adult video games in 2004.

=== Critical reception ===
The Guy Game received "generally unfavorable" reviews according to review aggregator Metacritic, scoring 48/100 on the PlayStation 2, and 47/100 on the Xbox. Critics were mixed on its merits as adult video game. Some reviewers considered it and its depiction of women to be tasteless and objectifying, with others describing it as an inferior alternative to softcore pornography as an imitation of Girls Gone Wild. Many critics remarked that it had little appeal due to its tepid content and tedious duration. Mike Angelo of PlayStation Magazine dismissed it as not risque enough to be worthwhile. Electronic Gaming Monthly found it to have "too much guesswork to see the goods". Brett Todd of PC Gamer noted it had "dubious value" due to its "limp" adult content. Greg Orlando of Xbox Nation found the footage to be poorly shot and edited, stating The Guy Game lacked any erotic appeal or redeeming qualities.

Reviewers also critiqued the quality of the trivia gameplay, with many critics remarking that The Guy Game lacked appeal as a single-player experience. Todd found the trivia gameplay to be "completely dissatisfying", citing the poor balance between obvious and inscrutable trivia questions, and the limited replay value due to a lack of questions. Dana Jongewaard of Official U.S. PlayStation Magazine expressed that the gameplay was "poorly constructed" and tedious due to the "slow and boring" pacing of episodes and the unclear rules of the minigames. Angelo similarly found it to be tedious and lacking challenge. Justin Leeper of GameSpy viewed it as having "virtually no gameplay", dismissing it as "far too complicated and asinine" for its intended player base due to its obscure minigames.

Some reviewers provided more sympathetic assessments of The Guy Game as an entertaining party title for groups. Jeff Gerstmann of GameSpot stated that it had appeal to its specific audience of college-age men, the mini-games were "fun" and "functional" for multiple players, and highlighted Sadler's performance as host. Similarly, Rob Watkins of GameZone noted that it had niche appeal, writing that its trivia aspects were "fun", the minigames were "simple but competitive", and the drinking minigames were "well integrated". Douglass C. Perry of IGN assessed it to be "solid, simple and fun" and ideal as a rental title played with friends. Brent Soboleski of Team Xbox described it as a "decent trivia game" for groups, particularly due to its ranking system, and noted its adult appeal made it "easy to overlook" its "drawbacks and limitations".

==== Retrospective reception ====
Some authors have retrospectively noted The Guy Game was representative of a trend of increasingly accessible commercial softcore adult video games released in the 2000s, alongside titles such as Leisure Suit Larry: Magna Cum Laude and Playboy: The Mansion. Brathwaite noted The Guy Game was the last notable example of the "short-lived craze" of interactive full-motion video in adult video games. In 2015, The Guardian cited The Guy Game as one of the worst games of all time, describing it as a "salacious" and "misogynist" title overshadowed by the circumstances of its censorship. In 2016, Stace Harman of IGN described it as a "lacklustre trivia" with "inane" humor.

== The Guy Game: Game Over! ==
Following its discontinuation, Topheavy Studios briefly repackaged footage of The Guy Game sold as a DVD titled The Guy Game: Game Over! The DVD contains uncensored footage and outtakes, including from participants not featured in the original game.
