= Desert Fox (video game) =

1985 wargame video game

- Developer: Sydney Development Corporation
- Publisher: Accolade
- Platforms: Commodore 64, Amstrad CPC
- Release: 1985
- Genre: Wargame
- Mode: Single-player

Desert Fox is a 1985 video game developed by Sydney Development Corporation and published by Accolade and U.S. Gold (in Europe). It was subsequently re-released by Avantage and PowerHouse.

== Reception ==
1991 and 1993 Computer Gaming World surveys of strategy and war games gave it one star out of five, stating that "it attempted to mix both arcade play and simulation, and ultimately failed on both levels".

In contrast, Zzap!64 thought the game was "an excellent blend of strategy and arcade action" and gave it an overall rating of 87%.
