= Road Raider =

1988 video game

- Developer: Gray Matter
- Publishers: Mindscape (USA); Gremlin Graphics (Europe)
- Platforms: Amiga, Amstrad CPC, Atari ST, Commodore 64, ZX Spectrum
- Release: 1988

Road Raider (known in Europe as Motor Massacre) is a 1988 video game published by Mindscape.

== Gameplay ==
Road Raider is a game where mad doctor Dr. A. Noid has turned most of the post-holocaust humanity of the United States into zombies and mutants which crave his food substitute that he named Slu.

== Reception ==
Adam Sherwin reviewed the game for Computer Gaming World, and wrote that "Road Raider has an interesting concept, an acceptable level of difficulty, and a tremendous graphics presentation. Everything, even the title screen, shows meticulous design and care".
