= The Young Indiana Jones Chronicles (video game) =

1992 video game

- Developers: Game Design: Chris Gray Enterprises Implementation: Jaleco
- Publisher: Jaleco
- Series: Indiana Jones
- Platform: Nintendo Entertainment System
- Release: December 1992
- Genre: Action
- Mode: Single-player

The Young Indiana Jones Chronicles is an action video game developed by Chris Gray Enterprises, Jaleco and published by Jaleco for the Nintendo Entertainment System (NES) in December 1992. It is based on the 1990s television series The Young Indiana Jones Chronicles.

== Gameplay ==
The Young Indiana Jones Chronicles features side-scrolling platform gameplay with the player controlling Indiana Jones. Weapons include dynamite, daggers, grenades, and guns, as well as Indiana's whip. The player begins only with the whip, which is replaced by the next weapon the player picks up. Weapons, as well as gold and other items, are picked up by destroying boxes. Weapons and items serve as Indiana's health: each time he is hit by an enemy, he loses a possession. If Indiana has no more possessions, he must use his fists to defend himself, and will die if hit again.

The game features eight levels played across three locations: Mexico (two levels), France (two levels), and Germany (four levels). The game's early levels are based on episodes of the television series, while later levels feature an original storyline. As Indiana, the player begins by fighting in the Mexican Civil War, and subsequently fights in Europe during World War I. Each level features a boss enemy that must be defeated.

== Plot ==
Young Indiana Jones arrives in Mexico on vacation, during the country's civil war. Indiana releases peasants captured by General Pancho Villa and his bandits, who are attempting to seize control. After defeating Villa in a battle, Indiana is informed of a person known as the Claw, who has stolen an Egyptian artifact known as the Jackal. Indiana follows the Claw through an abandoned silver mine. From atop a mining scaffold, the Claw uses exploding dynamite sticks to battle Indiana, who uses the falling rocks to defeat the Claw.

Indiana then takes a boat to Europe and enlists to fight in World War I. Indiana traverses a dangerous battlefield, fights a large tank, and subsequently learns of a long-range artillery gun codenamed Big Bertha. Indiana scales a high mountainside to locate and destroy Big Bertha in a battle. Indiana is promoted to the rank of Captain and is sent to Germany to stop the German commander, who plans to use poison gas to kill the Allied forces and enslave Europeans. Indiana boards an enemy train and travels across the railway cars, before ultimately battling the engineer at the front of the train. A fighter pilot ally swoops his plane down to pick up Indiana from the train. Indiana shoots down a group of enemy fighter pilots and then battles the Red Baron in his Fokker triplane.

Indiana reaches the German High Command, a fortress full of enemies and various security measures. There, Indiana battles the German commander and his battle tank, knocking out the commander and using his grenades to destroy the tank. Indiana reaches the weapons facility and must avoid poison liquid, as well as evil scientists and guards. Indiana reaches the poison gas lab, places a bomb there, and escapes the facility before it explodes.

== Reception ==
Nintendo Power praised the game's "variety of action", but was critical to the graphics and controls. Christoper Michael Baker of AllGame rated the game two and a half stars out of five and was critical of the difficult gameplay. Baker praised the graphics and cutscenes, but called the sound and music "pretty basic".
