= Aero the Acro-Bat =

1993 video game

- European Mega Drive box art
- Developer: Iguana Entertainment (Note: Game Boy Advance port developed by Atomic Planet.)
- Publishers: Sunsoft: Game Boy Advance; NA: Metro 3D; EU: Zoo Digital NS, PS, XB; WW: Ratalaika Games
- Director: Nigel Cook
- Producers: David Siller; Jeff Spangenberg; Jay Moon
- Designers: David Siller; Nigel Cook; Team Aero
- Programmers: Richard Cowie; Carl Wade; Jeff Spangenberg; Darrin Stubbington; David Brevik; David Crummack
- Composer: Rick Fox (as Fox Productions)
- Platforms: Sega Genesis; Super NES; Game Boy Advance; Nintendo Switch; PlayStation 4 PlayStation 5 Xbox One; Xbox Series X/S
- Release: October 1993: Genesis; NA: October 1993; EU: March 10, 1995 Super NES; NA: October 1993; UK: December 1993; PAL: November 1993; BR: December 1993 Game Boy Advance; NA: June 21, 2002; JP: December 20, 2002; PAL: April 2002 Switch, PS4, PS5, Xbox One, Series X/S; WW: August 2, 2024 (Super NES version); WW: November 1, 2024 (Game Boy Advance version)
- Genre: Platform
- Mode: Single-player

Aero the Acro-Bat is a 1993 platform video game developed by Iguana Entertainment and published by Sunsoft for the Super Nintendo Entertainment System and Sega Genesis. Aero the Acro-Bat, a red anthropomorphic bat, was created by David Siller. In 2002, Metro 3D released a version of the game for the Game Boy Advance, with a battery back-up (which the original versions lacked). The GBA version was titled Aero The Acro-Bat - Rascal Rival Revenge in Europe and Acrobat Kid (Note: Japanese: アクロバットキッズ, Hepburn: Akurobatto kizzu) in Japan. The Super NES version of the game was released on the Wii's Virtual Console in the PAL region and North America in July 2010. In 2024, the Super NES version was re-released in August for Nintendo Switch, PlayStation 4, PlayStation 5, Xbox One, and Xbox Series X/S, alongside a new localization in Japanese made by Shinyuden as Aero: Acrobat Kid (Note: Japanese: エアロ アクロバット キッズ, Hepburn: Earo: Akurobatto Kizzu) for the Nintendo Switch users in Japan, while the GBA version was re-released for the same platforms in November.

A sequel, Aero the Acro-Bat 2, was released in 1994, followed by the spin-off Zero the Kamikaze Squirrel.

== Gameplay ==
The levels are played in typical 2D platforming style. In order to clear them, the player must accomplish certain tasks so that the exit warp can be revealed. Those tasks include passing through hoops, stepping on platforms until they disappear, riding roller coasters, etc. There are four worlds with five levels in each one, and the levels are large, many of them containing awkwardly positioned spikes that kill instantly.

Aero can attack enemies by shooting limited stars or by doing an aerial diagonal drill attack at his target when he is in the air.

If enough points are collected at the end of a level, a bonus level can be played, in which Aero has to dive into a pool. The bonus level is a vertical platform level in the Genesis version. When Sunsoft converted the game for the Super NES, they changed the bonus level to utilise Mode 7 as a straightforward level to maneuver above an overworld map.

== Plot ==
A spoiled, rich kid named Edgar Ektor was a regular attendant at The World of Amusement Circus and Funpark, but was banned after a failed prank almost killed a lion. 20 years later, Edgar has become a powerful and evil industrialist. Aided by Zero the Kamikaze Squirrel and his Psycho Circus gang, Edgar sabotages the funpark and kidnaps all the circus performers. Aero the Acro-Bat is the circus' greatest star and the only hope for rescuing the performers (including his girlfriend Aeriel) and stopping Edgar's schemes.

== Development ==
For many years David Siller had ideas for the game's character in his head. He first sketched the concept of Aero in 1992. Although Aero's early designs resemble a human acrobat, Siller always intended him to be a bat. The gameplay mechanics were partly based on Namco’s Mappy series. By this time, Siller had agreed to join Sunsoft of America.

The final concept was designed by David's son Justin Siller, who was inspired by mixed themes from the 70s and 80s. Some of the enemies, items and in-levels that Siller proposed never made it in the finished game. The concept included a mission objective feature, which was not added in the original release, but it was implemented and modified in the Game Boy Advance version. Originally Aero was going to be released for the original Nintendo Entertainment System, but by this time 16-bit consoles were on the market, so the NES version was cancelled. Much of the game's work took place at Orange County, California. Both the Super NES and Genesis versions were being worked on simultaneously.

Plans were made by Sunsoft to port the game to Atari Jaguar sometime in 1994, but this version was never released.

After the success of the sequels, Siller left Sunsoft and joined Universal Interactive. Universal bought the rights of Siller's character and were intent on making Aero their mascot. He had intended to start up a sequel to the second game titled "Aero the Acrobat 3D" to be released on PlayStation to complete the series as a trilogy, but this concept never reached development, as Universal turned their attention to Crash Bandicoot. Following the success of that game, Crash was their official mascot instead of Aero. With no success in starting a new Acro-Bat game, Siller bought back Aero as he left Universal. While Siller worked at Capcom, the USA Bill Gardner wanted to make use of Aero, but the Japanese HQ denied that request in accordance to Siller's contract.

By summer 2002, Siller had to relocate to Texas. He did not have the funds to form his own studio, but was able to hire Atomic Planet to port his original game to the Game Boy Advance. Metro 3D found the game very promising for marketing and Siller directed the port during its development. In addition, Siller wanted to port the two sequels Aero the Acro-Bat 2 and Zero the Kamikaze Squirrel on Game Boy Advance in near future and compile them in a collection called "A-Z Force", but he cancelled those plans in favor of designing original games.

== Release ==
Promotional artwork of the game was shown at 1993 Winter Consumer Electronics Show in Nevada as well as the prototype version at the 1993 Summer Consumer Electronics Show in Chicago, where it stood out well above other exhibits. Aero the Acro-Bat was made Sunsoft's new mascot. By late 1993, Sunsoft was giving away free copies of the Super NES or Genesis version of the game to the first 100 people that sent them a 3x5 postcard to their address.

Ratalaika Games re-released Aero the Acro-Bat for Nintendo Switch, PlayStation 4, PlayStation 5, Xbox One, and Xbox Series X/S on August 2, 2024.

== Reception ==
Reception

Aggregate scores
Aggregator	Score			
Aggregator	GBA	Sega Genesis	SNES	Wii
GameRankings	67.08%	58.75%	72.00%	N/A
Metacritic	71%	N/A	N/A	N/A

Review scores
Publication	Score			
Publication	GBA	Sega Genesis	SNES	Wii
AllGame	N/A	3/5	N/A	N/A
Electronic Gaming Monthly	N/A	9/10, 7/10, 7/10, 8/10, 7/10	9/10, 8/10, 8/10, 8/10	N/A
GamePro	3.75/5	4.25/5	4.13/5	N/A
IGN	7.9/10	N/A	N/A	7.5/10
Nintendo Life	N/A	N/A	N/A	6/10

Award
Publication	Award
Electronic Gaming Monthly	1993 Best New Character

In all versions of the game, Aero the Acro-Bat received mixed reviews from critics. Electronic Gaming Monthly gave the Super NES version a score of 8.3 out of 10 and the Genesis version 7.6 out of 10. They criticized the absence of the exceptionally good music of the Super NES version but held it to still be an excellent game with its large, challenging levels. They also awarded Aero the Acro-Bat Best New Character of 1993. NintendoLife gave the Virtual Console release of the Super NES version a 6 out of 10.

Four reviewers in GameFan gave the Genesis version 93, 97, 87, and 90 Video Games: The Ultimate Gaming Magazine gave both the Genesis and SNES versions 8 out of 10.

Conversely, Digital Press gave the game only 3 out of 10.
