= Infiltrator (video game) =

1986 video game

- Spectrum 48K cover art
- Developers: Chris Gray Enterprises; Paragon Programming (CPC, Spectrum)
- Publishers: NA: Mindscape; EU: U.S. Gold
- Designer: Chris Gray
- Platforms: Commodore 64, MS-DOS, Apple II, Atari 8-bit, Amstrad CPC, ZX Spectrum
- Release: NA: 1986; EU: 1986
- Genre: Combat flight simulation
- Mode: Single-player

Infiltrator is a combat flight simulation game published in North America in 1986 by Mindscape and in Europe by U.S. Gold. It was developed for the Commodore 64, MS-DOS, Apple II, and Atari 8-bit computers by Chris Gray Enterprises. Paragon Programming ported it to the Amstrad CPC and ZX Spectrum.

The player takes on the role of a master-of-all-trades hero named Johnny "Jimbo Baby" McGibbits. The player's objective is to fly an Airwolf-like helicopter named the Gizmo DHX-3, land at enemy bases, and infiltrate compounds to stop the mad leader.

== Gameplay ==
Infiltrator is divided into six missions: three helicopter flying missions, and three ground-based missions, which are paired together.

Atari 8-bit screenshot

During the helicopter missions (the first, third and fifth missions), the objective is to take off in the helicopter, program the ADF (Automatic Direction Finder) to set the correct course, maneuver the helicopter to the landing area while hailing nearby planes to determine if they are friend or foe and engaging in firefights if the player responds incorrectly, and finally land the helicopter safely without detection via whisper mode. The helicopter is equipped with missiles, guns, chaffs, flares, Radio Communications, a Status terminal, a Turbo engine and a whisper mode.

Once the player lands safely, the ground base mission begins. The player has access to five different items in their inventory. The papers are used to trick the enemy into thinking that they are part of the mad leader's forces. If the guards get suspicious, the player must use their gas canister or gas grenades to knock them out. The mine detector is used to discover buried mines while walking about. Finally, the explosives are used in the final ground mission to destroy the mad leader's base.

The player's goal in each mission is to find a security card hidden in a cabinet in one of several multi-room buildings. Once located, the card will open up the locked security doors protecting the goal for each mission. In the second mission, the player must find the four chemical containers and take them to the lab for analysis to determine which is the nerve gas neutralizer, and then find the vat of nerve gas to neutralize it. In the fourth mission, the player must find and rescue Dr. Phineas Gump, a scientist who has been captured by the mad leader. The player must feed him the invisibility pill to make their escape. In the sixth mission, the player must find all seven of the mad leader's missile control rooms and plant explosives in them, then escape before the 10-minute timer (which lasts for 20 minutes of actual time) counts down to zero.

After completing the ground mission, the player must return to the helicopter and fly back to home base. The return flight is much shorter with fewer enemy planes than the missions to get to the enemy base. Once the player completes a mission, they are given a four letter passcode, so that they can return to the same mission during subsequent plays.

== Reception ==
Infiltrator was Mindscape's second best-selling Commodore game as of late 1987. Steve Panak writing for ANALOG Computing approved of the documentation, but preferred Ace of Aces as an Atari 8-bit flight simulator. A 1994 survey of strategic space games set in the year 2000 and later gave the game one star out of five, stating that "Tongue-in-cheek documentation quickly grows tiresome, as does the program itself".

== Legacy ==
Infiltrator was followed by a sequel, Infiltrator II: The Next Day, released in 1987 for the Apple II, Commodore 64, IBM PC compatibles, and the Nintendo Entertainment System. Since the original was never released on the NES, the sequel was released as Infiltrator on that platform. Computer Gaming World awarded Infiltrator II zero stars and described it as "Even worse than the original".

A third sequel, Infiltrator III, was mentioned in the April 1990 issue of Compute!'s Gazette.

The game was novelized by Peter Lerangis, as part of the Worlds of Power series published by Scholastic Books.
