= Johnny Bazookatone =

1996 video game

- 3DO box art
- Developer: Arc Developments
- Publisher: U.S. Gold
- Designer: Craig Davison
- Programmer: Chris Coupe
- Artist: Paul Walker
- Composers: Andi McGinty; Des Tong; Sax by Snake Davis; Guitar by Mike Hehir
- Platforms: 3DO, MS-DOS, PlayStation, Saturn
- Release: 3DO: NA: 1996; MS-DOS: NA: 1996; PlayStation: NA: February 22, 1996; JP: April 26, 1996; EU: January 1996; Saturn: NA: February 1996; EU: February 1996; JP: April 26, 1996
- Genre: Platform
- Mode: Single-player

Johnny Bazookatone is a platforming video game developed by Arc Developments and published by U.S. Gold for the 3DO, PlayStation, Sega Saturn, and MS-DOS computers in 1996. Some releases also came equipped with a music CD based on the game's musical score.

== Plot ==
The game follows the protagonist, Johnny Bazookatone, trapped in the year 2050 in Sin Sin Prison by El Diablo, lord of the underworld. His guitar, known as "Anita" is taken from him, and so Johnny must travel to reclaim it.

== Reception ==
Reception

Review scores
Publication	Score
AllGame	3/5 (PS)
Electronic Gaming Monthly	7/10, 8.5/10, 8/10, 7/10 (PS)
Famitsu	5/10, 4/10, 5/10, 6/10 (SAT) 5/10, 4/10, 5/10, 3/10 (PS)
IGN	5/10
Next Generation	3/5 (SAT)
Maximum	1/5 (SAT, PS)
Sega Saturn Magazine	53% (SAT)

Johnny Bazookatone was released for the Sega Saturn and PlayStation in Japan on April 26, 1996.

Johnny Bazookatone had received mixed reviews from critics. For PlayStation version, the four reviewers of Electronic Gaming Monthly praised the sharply detailed graphics, the player character's complex moves, and the high level of difficulty. They summarized "If you are looking for a great side-scrolling game, Johnny B. is your man!" A brief review in GamePro said that the game's graphics and music are the strong points, while the sometimes inaccurate controls is the main weak point. Maximum panned the game, criticizing the poor sprite detection and dull level design.

Reviewing the Saturn version, Sam Hickman of Sega Saturn Magazine called Johnny Bazookatone "three hundred hours of the most boring platform action ever invented", citing blurry sprites, enemies which are persistently annoying rather than challenging, and the game's generally outdated look and feel. A reviewer from IGN praised the visuals and character design, but criticized the game's originality as well as its "unfairly high level" of difficulty.

Scary Larry of GamePro commented on the game's irritating difficulty, particularly executing the crucial Shooting Float move, but was delighted with the rendered sprites, backgrounds, and music, and concluded, "Fans looking for a humorous cross between Earthworm Jim and Donkey Kong Country should check out Johnny." A reviewer for Next Generation opined that while the gameplay mechanics are generic, the level design is clever and the graphics are genuinely next generation. He summarized, "While it's tempting to swear-off the side-scrolling action game as a by-gone product of the 16-bit era, there's something devilishly tempting about a game that looks and plays as good as Johnny Bazookatone." Maximum regarded the Saturn version as unfavorably as the PlayStation version, lambasting it for its "hideously dated" story concept, overly small sprites, last generation graphics, lack of intelligent design to the levels or enemies, and frustrating puzzles.

Scary Larry gave the 3DO version overall approval as well. While criticizing the awkward controls and lack of gameplay innovation, he found the game's "hip and well drawn" graphics, mixture of funk and house music, and overall style were enough to recommend it.
