= Perfect Weapon (video game) =

1996 video game

- Developer: Gray Matter
- Publishers: NA/EU: ASC Games; JP: Human Entertainment
- Designer: David J. Klein
- Platforms: PlayStation, Windows
- Release: PlayStation: NA: November 21, 1996; EU: August, 1997; JP: July 3, 1997; Windows: NA: May 1, 1997
- Genres: Action-adventure game, beat 'em up
- Mode: Single-player

Perfect Weapon (Note: Known in Japan as Body Hazard (Japanese: ボディハザード, Hepburn: Bodihazādo).) is an action-adventure video game developed by Gray Matter and published by ASC Games. The game released on November 21, 1996, for PlayStation and February 1997 for Windows 95. Marketed as "Tekken 2 meets Resident Evil", it met with mediocre reviews. During development, the game was scheduled for release in May 1997 for the Sega Saturn, but the port was cancelled. The game was re-released on March 25, 2010, in North America for the PlayStation Network as a PSOne Classic and can be played on PSP, PS3, and PSVita.

== Plot ==
An Earth Defense Force top agent and martial arts world champion named Blake Hunter is knocked out after a winning match and taken away to an alien environment. Now all alone, Blake explores his surroundings, fighting for his life and trying to find answers.

== Gameplay ==
The player navigates Blake Hunter through a number of screens, each with their own fixed camera angle. On the screen there is a constant health bar and minimap. Unsecure areas are shaded red and when they become secured, they are shaded green. When faced with an enemy, the minimap is hidden and an enemy health bar shows. Blake can defend himself with punches and roundhouse kicks. Throughout the game, Blake comes across a number of power-ups to heal wounds and fight better.

== Reception ==
Reception

Review score
Publication	Score
Next Generation	2/5 (PS1)

GamePro praised the game for its graphics but found the hit detection rather poor and compared the game unfavorably to Resident Evil. Next Generation criticized the game for its flawed controls and confusing levels and compared it to Alone in the Dark and Tekken.
