= Wayne's World (video game) =

1993 video game

- Super NES cover art
- Developers: Gray Matter (SNES, Genesis); Radical Entertainment (GB, NES); Robert Fiorini & Associates (MS-DOS)
- Publishers: THQ (consoles); Capstone (MS-DOS)
- Designers: Johan Thornton (GB); Ed Konyha (GB, NES); David Bright (Genesis, SNES)
- Programmers: Johan Thornton (GB); Chris Lippmann (NES)
- Artists: Ed Konyha (GB, NES)
- Composers: Paul Wilkinson (GB, NES); Rob Wallace (MS-DOS); Peter Stone, Nick Eastridge (Genesis, SNES)
- Platforms: Super NES, NES, Genesis, Game Boy, MS-DOS
- Release: Super NES: NA: April 1993; EU: 1993; Genesis: NA: 1993; Game Boy, NES: NA: November 1993
- Genre: Platform
- Mode: Single-player

Wayne's World is a platform game based on the film of the same name and published in 1993 by THQ. Different versions of the game were released. The NES and Game Boy games were developed by Radical Entertainment and have Wayne and Garth as playable characters. The Super NES and Genesis/Mega Drive games were developed by Gray Matter with only Wayne as a playable character.

== Gameplay and Premise ==
=== NES and Game Boy ===
The NES version keeps true to the plot of the original film, as the premise involves Wayne and Garth trying to stop a rich producer from buying their public access television show. The first level takes place at Kramer's Music Store, where Wayne fights several sentient instruments to obtain the Excallbur, such as guitars, drums, cymbals, saxophone, trumpets, and stacks of Barry Manilow records. In the second level, Wayne and Garth go to the Gasworks to battle bouncers, martial artists, and tough guys in order to meet Cassandra, who is performing with her band at the venue. Following this encounter, Garth fights ninjas and black cats in an alleyway (level three) while Wayne takes on security guards, floating television screens, black spiders, and power cords at Ben's studio to find the show contract. However, he fails to find it and, in the next level, goes to Ben's condo where not only does he try to get the contract but also save Cassandra from the producer. There's a time limit to completing each stage.

The player controls both characters, each with different attacks; Wayne uses karate kicks learned by his girlfriend Cassandra, and Garth is equipped with a 4000-volt laser gun. Both characters can duck, jump regularly, and do a "cool major-high flip jump" activated by pressing A and up on the D-pad. The player starts the game with four lives and 22 "worthiness" units representing health points. Worthiness points can increase by collecting donuts and P power-ups that are garnered by killing enemies. The P power-ups include two extra worthiness units and strengthen the power of Wayne and Garth's attacks, giving Wayne 20 "roundhouse kicks" and Garth 20 100-gigawatt blasts. After completing each level, there's a bonus level consisting of several donuts for the player to collect; if all donuts are garnered, the player will receive an extra life.

=== Super NES and Genesis ===
At Noah's Arcade, Wayne and Garth get sucked into the game Zantar where Garth is captured by the titular purple gelatinous cube. In rescuing his friend, Wayne traverses through four levels, each surrealist versions of places he encounters in real life. Along the way, Wayne is equipped with a guitar weapon that can be power-up'd with amps that execute larger chords, "chorus" power-ups that allow for three-chords to be played on screen at a time, a "distortion" icon that makes the chords move in "a distorted path," and a "homer" power-up that move towards enemies. Other items Wayne can collect include "Schwing" items that obliterate all enemies currently on the screen, a thumbs-up icon increasing the player's "worthiness" level (although it's unknown and not explained in the manual what that is), hearts that serve as extra lives, and additional guitar items that increase the amount of notes Wayne can play at a time.

The first level is Kramer's Music Store, where many instruments coming to life going after Wayne; these include accordions, trombones, shooting floating bagpipes, clarinets that shoot missiles from off screen, drums, falling guitars, kazoos that charge in swarms, cellos that attack with bows, and saxophones. In the second level, Wayne finds himself shrank at Stan Mikita's Donut Shop, with enemies like donut monsters, coffee cups, grease, steam blasts, and falling sugar cups attacking him. What follows is the third level, Wayne and Garth's favorite nightclub named the Gasworks, where sentient objects continue to serve as enemies; these include darts, bar stools, shooting disco balls, "rock 'n roll boots," gas jets, "six-legged Beatles," and shooting Yellow Submarines. Wayne also faces human bouncers in the level. The final level is a fantasy version of a suburb Wayne used to live in, where he has a showdown with Zantar and saves Garth.

== Reception ==
Reception

Review scores
Publication	Score	
Publication	Sega Genesis	SNES
Computer and Video Games		63/100
Electronic Gaming Monthly		5/10, 6/10, 4/10, 3/10
GamesMaster		29%
Super Play		26%
VideoGames & Computer Entertainment	5/10, 3/10, 4/10, 5/10, 6/10	
Sega-16	1/10	

Jonathan Davies of Super Play, reviewing the SNES version, was bored with it, describing its gameplay as only "jumping around collecting things" with the only appealing factors being its voice samples and Wayne and Garth's faces.

Computer Gaming World stated in 1993 that the PC version of "Wayne's World is, like, fun, man". The magazine recommended the game to those new to adventures, who would enjoy a "rather typical" game with "good humor, unexpected twists, and an odd setting". Describing it as "bogus", a later review in the magazine advised against Wayne's World as an introductory adventure game for children.

Commenting on the NES version, GamePro's Data Carvey praised the game's humor, such as with its enemies, between-level cutscenes, and manual, but panned its perceived lack of difficulty and poor presentation; he wrote that the enemies were easily beatable, the backgrounds and sprites were "undetailed" and "flat," and its audio consisted of a "pretty cheesy soundtrack" and sparse sound effects reminiscent of games from the 1980s.

Super Pro's Sam Hickman named Wayne's World the worst SNES game of 1993. In 1995, Flux magazine ranked Wayne’s World 19th on their 25 All Time Worst Video Games.

Conversely, Brazilian magazine Ação Games, gave the SNES game a fun rating of 4/4, praising the graphics, sound, and the richness of items.

== Other games ==
An adventure game based on the film was released for personal computers by Capstone. Argonaut was also developing a version for the unreleased Super NES CD-ROM upgrade.
