= İstanbul Efsaneleri: Lale Savaşçıları =

1994 video game

- Developer(s): SiliconWorx
- Publisher(s): Raks New Media
- Platform(s): Amiga, DOS
- Release: 1994 : Amiga; 1996 : DOS
- Genre(s): Fantasy role-playing
- Mode(s): Single-player

İstanbul Efsaneleri: Lale Savaşçıları (Legends of Istanbul: Tulip Warriors) is the first Turkish fantasy role-playing video game. Designed in a funny and comical style, the game is set in an alternate Istanbul. The language of the game is Turkish. It was first published for Amiga and PC platforms in years 1994 and 1997, respectively, and a revival gold edition was published later in 2005 to make it work under newer operating systems using DOS emulators.

Players could select one of five species to create their characters. These species included "students", "employees", "dumps", "luuts" and "prostitutes". In-game objects include weapons like throwing-slippers, rulers and armor like flannel shirts, white undershirts (wife-beaters) and metal-music T-shirts. Spells were replaced with curses and magicians with legendary characters like "the Silicon Father". The game was also important for its production of staged cut-scenes with real actors and decoration, displayed in a custom full-motion-video technique (early for its time) and its original music score.
