= Inside Trader: The Authentic Stock Trading Game =

1987 business simulation video game

- Publisher: Cosmi Corporation
- Platform: MS-DOS
- Release: 1987
- Genre: Business simulation

Inside Trader: The Authentic Stock Trading Game is a business simulation video game published for MS-DOS in 1987 by Cosmi Corporation.

== Gameplay ==
Inside Trader: The Authentic Stock Trading Game is a game in which players receive $30,000 to be used as seed money in a simulation of a securities environment.

== Reception ==
Jasper Sylvester reviewed the game for Computer Gaming World, and stated that "Inside Trader is fun, fast, and fascinating, but it is not "The Authentic Stock Trading Game" it is billed as. Nevertheless, it is interesting enough for prospective stock market manipulators of simulated securities environments to pay attention to."
