= Indiana Jones in Revenge of the Ancients =

1987 video game

- Developer: Angelsoft
- Publisher: Mindscape
- Platforms: Apple II, Mac, MS-DOS
- Release: 1987
- Genre: Interactive fiction

Indiana Jones in Revenge of the Ancients is an interactive fiction video game developed by American studio Angelsoft and published by Mindscape in 1987 for the Apple II, Mac, and MS-DOS compatible operating systems. The text-only game is based on the Indiana Jones franchise.

== Gameplay ==
Indiana Jones in Revenge of the Ancients is a text adventure game that is not based on any of the films. The eponymous character travels to the Mexican jungle to explore the Tepotzteco Pyramid, with the purpose of getting the Mazatec Power Key before the Nazi forces, under the command of Plebinheim, get to it first.

== Development ==
Ann Watson of Angelsoft described their design philosophy: "You drop the descriptive literary nuances and the introspective side of characters in exchange for a higher degree of player involvement."

== Reception ==
In 2008, IGN ranked the game at number nine on its list of "Top 10 Indiana Jones Games", writing, "While not as clever as the Zork series, Revenge of the Ancients tells a good yarn that fits nicely in the Indy oeuvre." Retro Gamer wrote: "On reflection, the game is a fair attempt to implement a pure Indy adventure as opposed to the action games that paved the way before it, but as you might expect, it's set back by the usual trappings of the text adventure genre." Christopher Carton, in the book A Guide to Movie Based Video Games described the game as "[...] a classic Indiana Jones tale, and one that deserves more attention, for those with the patience for its presentation." Retro Games magazine noted the game as well-written but very difficult.

== See also ==
- James Bond 007: A View to a Kill, another licensed text adventure by the same developer and publisher
