= The Dam Busters (video game) =

1984 video game

- European cover art
- Developer: Sydney Development
- Publishers: EU: U.S. Gold; NA: Accolade; Coleco (ColecoVision); Apollo Technica (NEC)
- Designer: J. Stewart Eastbrook
- Platforms: Amstrad CPC, Apple II, ColecoVision, Commodore 64, MS-DOS, MSX, NEC PC-9801, ZX Spectrum
- Release: 1984
- Genre: Air combat simulation
- Mode: Single-player

The Dam Busters is a combat flight simulation game set in World War II and published by U.S. Gold. It was released in 1984 for ColecoVision and Commodore 64; in 1985 for Apple II, MS-DOS, MSX, and ZX Spectrum; then in 1986 for the Amstrad CPC and NEC PC-9801. It is loosely based on Operation Chastise and the 1955 film.

== Gameplay ==
Aircraft instruments

The player chooses from three different night missions, each of which is increasingly difficult. In all three, the goal is to successfully bomb a dam. On the practice run, the player can approach and bomb the dam without any other obstacles. The two other missions feature various enemies to overcome, and the flight start from either the French coast or a British airfield.

During flight, the player controls every aspect of the bomber from each of the seven crew positions: Pilot, Front Gunner, Tail Gunner, Bomb Aimer, Navigator, Engineer, and Squadron Leader. Leaving any of these positions unattended during an event could spell the death of the person in that position, rendering it useless during further encounters. The player must evade enemies, plan their approach, and set all of the variables (speed, height, timing, etc.) to execute a successful bombing. Sometimes, it becomes necessary to deal with emergencies, such as engine fires.

While en route to the target the player can expect to encounter attacks by enemy aircraft, barrage balloons, flak and enemy searchlights. Events like this will flash along the border of the screen, while indicating the key to press to take the player to the station in need of assistance. For example, when flying through enemy search lights, the player will need to man the gunner's station and shoot out the lights on the ground. If left unattended, the player can expect flak and enemy aircraft to start damaging the bomber.

Once the player begins the final run to their target, they are presented with the custom bombing sights, as made famous by the story. When the player toggles the bomb, they are shown an animation of the bomb bouncing along the lake and hitting (or not hitting) the target dam.

== Reception ==
Reception

Award
Publication	Award
Sinclair User	SU Classic

Info rated The Dam Busters on the Commodore 64 three-plus stars out of five, stating that it "lacks the depth and variability of a game like Silent Service, but has better than average graphics and play features". Computer Gaming World gave The Dam Busters two out of five points in an overview of World War II simulations, stating "this product's graphics and 'feel' make it too much of a game and not enough of a simulation".
