= Gray Matter (company) =

Canadian video game developer

Gray Matter Inc.
- Industry: Video games
- Founded: 1985
- Founders: Chris Gray
- Defunct: 1997
- Headquarters: Oakville, Ontario, Canada
- Number of employees: 75 (1995)

Gray Matter Inc. was a Canadian video game developer based in Oakville, Ontario. It was established by Chris Gray in 1985 and disbanded in 1997.

== History ==
Gray Matter was founded by Chris Gray in Oakville, Ontario in 1985. At its peak in 1995, the studio had approximately 75 employees. Gray wound down the company in 1997 due to a lack of funding.

== Games developed ==
=== Chris Gray Enterprises Inc. ===
Title	Release date	Platform(s)
Whirlinurd	1985	Commodore 64, Atari 8-bit
Infiltrator	1986	Commodore 64, Apple II, Atari 8-bit
Infiltrator II	1987	Commodore 64, Apple II, MS-DOS (1988), NES (1989)
Captain Planet and The Planeteers	1991	NES
The Young Indiana Jones Chronicles	1992	NES

=== Gray Matter Inc. ===
Title	Release date	Platform(s)
Techno Cop	1988	Apple II, Amstrad CPC, Atari ST, C64, MS-DOS, ZX Spectrum, Amiga (1989), Sega Genesis (1990)
Road Raider	1988	Amiga, Atari ST
Fiendish Freddy's Big Top o' Fun	1989	Amiga
The Ultimate Ride	1990	Amiga
Mad Max	July 1990	NES
Dirty Harry	Dec 14, 1990	NES
James Bond Jr.	Oct 1992	Super NES
Wayne's World	Feb 18, 1993	Super NES
The Terminator	April 1993	Super NES
B.O.B.	June 1993	Super NES
WWF King of the Ring	Sep 1993	NES
The Incredible Crash Dummies	Oct 1993	Super NES
The Ren & Stimpy Show: Veediots!	Oct 1993	Super NES
The Amazing Spider-Man vs. The Kingpin	Nov 3, 1993	Sega CD (additional graphics)
Foes of Ali	1995	3DO
Phoenix 3	1995	3DO
NHL All-Star Hockey	1995	Sega Saturn, Game Gear
Super R.B.I. Baseball	June 1995	Super NES
NBA Action	1996	Sega Saturn
Perfect Weapon	November 21, 1996	PlayStation, MS-DOS
The Crow: City of Angels	February 28, 1997	PlayStation, Sega Saturn, MS-DOS
The Condemned	unreleased	PC
