= Techno Cop =

1988 video game

- Developers: Gray Matter; Imagexcel; Punk Development (Genesis)
- Publishers: EU: Gremlin Graphics; NA: U.S. Gold; NA: RazorSoft (Genesis)
- Designer: Chris Gray
- Programmers: Esteban Ahn (Apple II); Jeff Spangenberg (Genesis)
- Artists: Nick Gray; Dennis Turner; Matt Stubbington (Genesis)
- Composers: Ben Daglish; Kevin T. Seghetti (Genesis); Scott L. Statton (Genesis)
- Platforms: Amiga, Amstrad CPC, Apple II, Atari ST, Commodore 64, MS-DOS, Genesis, ZX Spectrum
- Release: 1988: Amiga, Atari ST, MS-DOS; 1990: Genesis
- Genres: Run and gun, racing
- Mode: Single-player

Techno Cop is a 1988 video game for the Amiga, Amstrad CPC, Apple II, Atari ST, Commodore 64, MS-DOS, and ZX Spectrum. It was subsequently ported to the Genesis in 1990. The gameplay combines pseudo-3D driving in the graphical style of Out Run with side-scrolling action as the player controls a police officer driving to and then moving through various seedy locations in a one-man war against crime. The game was the first game on the Genesis to have a warning label due to its violent content.

The game was panned by critics for its simplistic graphics, sound, and the fact that many of the levels looked too similar. A Sega Genesis sequel, Techno Cop: The Final Mission, was planned but never released.

A Nintendo Entertainment System version was developed by Probe Software, planned for a 1992 released by Tengen, but was cancelled.

== Plot ==
In the single-player side-scrolling game the player is a cop in a seedy futuristic urban city. Armed with a pistol, the player has to kill various thugs, before the timer runs out. While the game has several levels, the background in the game does not change often. The other half of the game is a driving sequence, similar to other computer games such as RoadBlasters.

== Development ==
Techno Cop was one of the first games made for the Mega Drive/Genesis from a third party developer and was part of an attempt by RazorSoft to test what sort of content would Sega allow on a game made for one of its systems.

Both Nintendo of America and Sega of America insisted upon previewing games made for their system, prior to release, to check for bugs and potentially controversial or offensive content. Sega allowed Techno Cop to be released without requiring RazorSoft to remove or tone down the game's violent content. Along with the blood, when the playable character shot at another character, they would be blown apart.

== Reception ==
Computer Gaming World gave the game a positive review, saying "despite occasional boredom in the driving segment, the game is extremely absorbing".
