= International Tennis Open =

1992 video game

- Developer: Infogrames Multimedia
- Publishers: Philips Interactive Media; Pathé Interactive
- Designer: Bertrand Brocard
- Platforms: CD-i, Classic Mac OS, MS-DOS
- Release: 1992
- Genre: Sports

International Tennis Open is a sports video game developed by Infogrames Multimedia and co-published by Philips Interactive Media and Pathé Interactive in 1992. It was released for Philips CD-i, Classic Mac OS, and MS-DOS. It was a pack-in game for some CD-i models. The UK version of the game is available in French and English as it is a French game.

== Plot ==
Players take on the role of "Victor Player" - An experienced player whose nationality depends on what language has been selected. There are three gameplay modes. "Match" allows players to play a single game of tennis. "Tournament" is a series of games against various opponents. "Training" is practice against a ball throwing machine.

In between or at the start of games, sports commentator George Eddy comments on the game.

== Reception ==
GamePro gave the CD-i version a perfect score, lauding the game for its "awesome, realistic, rotoscoped graphics and animation similar to, but more fluid than, Delphine Software's Flashback", its realistic sounds, and its challenging AI opponents.
