= U.S. Gold =

British video game publisher

U.S. Gold Limited
- Type: Subsidiary
- Industry: Video games
- Founded: 1984; 42 years ago
- Founder: Anne and Geoff Brown
- Defunct: April 1996; 30 years ago
- Fate: Acquired by and folded into Eidos Interactive
- Headquarters: Witton, Birmingham, England
- Parent: CentreGold (1984–1996); Eidos Interactive (1996)

U.S. Gold Limited was a British video game publisher based in Witton, Birmingham, England. The company was founded in 1984 by Anne and Geoff Brown in parallel to their distributor firm, CentreSoft, both of which became part of Woodward Brown Holdings (later renamed CentreGold).

U.S. Gold started life as a UK distributor and manufacturer for existing games licensed from the US market, but soon moved towards publishing original titles.

Following the 1996 takeover of CentreGold by Eidos Interactive, the U.S. Gold name disappeared.

== History ==
=== Early history ===
U.S. Gold was founded in 1984. It initially functioned as a UK manufacturer and distributor for existing games licensed from US publishers (such as Cosmi, Microprose and Synsoft/Synapse) that had, until then, only been available on import.

Following negotiations, U.S. Gold were able to sell these games for £10 on the British market, rather than the £30 or so they initially sold for in the United States. Some titles were also converted to run on formats more popular in the UK (e.g. Tapper, which was converted for- amongst others- the ZX Spectrum via Ocean/Platinum Productions and the BBC Micro by Micro Power).

=== Increasing success ===
By 1985, U.S. Gold projected a turnover of US$6 million for their first fiscal year, and expected to release further 150 games in the year to come. The company increasingly moved towards being a publisher of original titles in their own right.

In 1987, they launched GO! label with Trantor: The Last Stormtrooper being the first game released under the label. In 1988, U.S. Gold received the Golden Joystick Award for "Software House of the Year". The company also operated the budget range label Kixx.

In 1988, the company struck a deal with Japanese company Capcom to port their arcade video games for home computers in Europe. They paid £2 million or $3,557,642 (equivalent to $9,700,000 in 2025) for a ten-game deal with Capcom. The first four games they announced as part of the deal were ports of the 1987 arcade games Street Fighter, Tiger Road, 1943: The Battle of Midway and Black Tiger for the Commodore 64, ZX Spectrum, Amstrad CPC, Atari ST and Amiga platforms. Their first five Capcom releases sold over 250,000 copies in the UK by 1989, with their best-selling Capcom release up until then being Bionic Commando with over 70,000 UK sales. Their next Capcom release was Forgotten Worlds in 1989.

In October 1994, CentreGold acquired the developer Core Design.

=== Sale and closure ===
In April 1996, Eidos Interactive acquired the entire CentreGold umbrella (including U.S. Gold) for £17.6 million; as a result of this, U.S. Gold and CentreSoft ceased all operations.

== Games published ==
Year	Title	Platform(s)
1984	Beach Head	Commodore 64, Amstrad CPC, ZX Spectrum, BBC Micro
1984	The Dam Busters	Amstrad CPC, Apple II, C64, MS-DOS, MSX, ZX Spectrum
1984	Dropzone	Atari 8-bit, Commodore 64, Game Boy, Game Gear, NES
1984	Raid over Moscow	Commodore 64, Amstrad CPC, ZX Spectrum, BBC
1984	Impossible Mission	Commodore 64, Acorn Electron, Amstrad CPC, Apple II, Atari 7800, BBC Micro, Master System, ZX Spectrum
1985	Beach Head II: The Dictator Strikes Back	Commodore 64, Apple II, Atari 8-bit, Amstrad CPC, ZX Spectrum
1985	Bruce Lee	ZX Spectrum, Amstrad CPC
1985	Road Runner	Atari ST
1986	Summer Games	Commodore 64, Amiga, Apple II, Atari 2600, Atari 7800, Atari 8-bit, Atari ST, Master System, ZX Spectrum
1986	Summer Games II	Commodore 64, Apple II, Atari ST, MS-DOS, ZX Spectrum, Amstrad CPC, Amiga
1985	The Goonies	Amstrad CPC, Apple II, Atari 8-bit, Commodore 64, MSX, ZX Spectrum
1985	Whirlinurd	Atari 8-bit, Commodore 64
1985	Winter Games	Commodore 64, Apple II, Amiga, Atari ST, Apple IIGS, Amstrad CPC, ZX Spectrum, IBM PC, Atari 2600, Atari 7800, Macintosh
1985	Spy Hunter	Amstrad CPC, Atari 2600, Atari 8-bit, BBC Micro, ZX Spectrum, C64, Apple II, ColecoVision, IBM PC
1986	Gauntlet	Amstrad CPC, Atari ST, Apple II, Apple IIGS, Macintosh, Commodore 64, MSX, Master System, NES, Genesis, ZX Spectrum, MS-DOS, PlayStation
1986	Revolution	ZX Spectrum, Amstrad CPC
1986	Zorro	ZX Spectrum
1986	World Games	Amiga, Amstrad CPC, Apple II, Apple IIGS, Atari ST, Commodore 64, MSX, Master System, IBM PC, ZX Spectrum
1986	Ace of Aces	Amstrad CPC, Atari 8-bit, Atari 7800, Commodore 64, MSX, MS-DOS, Master System, ZX Spectrum
1986	Kung-Fu Master	Commodore 64
1986	Infiltrator	Commodore 64, Amstrad CPC, ZX Spectrum
1986	Leader Board	Commodore 64/128, Atari 8-bit, Amstrad CPC, Amstrad PCW, ZX Spectrum, Amiga, Atari ST, Apple II, MS-DOS, Mac, Master System, Game Gear, Genesis/Mega Drive, Acorn Archimedes
1987	California Games	Apple II, Commodore 64, Amiga, Amstrad CPC, Apple IIGS, Atari 2600, Lynx, Atari ST, MS-DOS, MSX, NES, Sega Genesis, Master System, ZX Spectrum
1987	Indiana Jones and the Temple of Doom	Amstrad CPC, Commodore 64, MSX, ZX Spectrum
1987	Tower Toppler	Amiga, Atari ST, Commodore 64, MS-DOS
1987	Out Run	PC-88, Atari ST, Amiga, Amstrad CPC, Commodore 64, MSX, PC Engine, MS-DOS, ZX Spectrum
1987	RoadBlasters	Genesis, Lynx, Amstrad CPC, ZX Spectrum, Commodore 64, Amiga, Atari ST, NES
1987	Solomon's Key	Commodore 64, Amstrad CPC, ZX Spectrum, Atari ST, IBM PC, PC Engine
1987	Street Sports Basketball	Amiga, Amstrad CPC, Apple II, Commodore 64, MS-DOS, ZX Spectrum
1987	Tag Team Wrestling	Apple II, Commodore 64, IBM PC
1987	Gauntlet II	Amiga, Amstrad CPC, Atari ST, Commodore 64, Game Boy, MS-DOS, NES, ZX Spectrum
1988	1943: The Battle of Midway	Amiga, Atari ST, Commodore 64, Amstrad CPC, ZX Spectrum
1988	Advanced Dungeons & Dragons: Heroes of the Lance	Amiga, Amstrad CPC, Atari ST, C64, FM Towns, MS-DOS, MSX2, PC-88, PC-98, Master System, ZX Spectrum
1988	Bionic Commando	Amiga, Atari ST, Commodore 64, Amstrad CPC, ZX Spectrum
1988	Dive Bomber	Commodore 64, Amstrad CPC, Atari ST, MS-DOS, ZX Spectrum
1988	Last Duel	Amiga, Amstrad CPC, Atari ST, Commodore 64, ZX Spectrum
1988	Vigilante	Amiga, Amstrad CPC, Atari ST, Commodore 64, MSX, ZX Spectrum
1988	Thunder Blade	Amiga, Amstrad CPC, Atari ST, Commodore 64, MS-DOS, MSX, IBM PC, X68000, ZX Spectrum
1988	Techno Cop	Apple II, Atari ST, MS-DOS, Amiga
1988	Street Fighter	Amiga, Atari ST, Commodore 64, Amstrad CPC, ZX Spectrum
1989	Strider	Amiga, Amstrad CPC, Atari ST, Commodore 64, IBM PC, X68000, ZX Spectrum
1989	U.N. Squadron	Amiga, Amstrad CPC, Atari ST, Commodore 64, ZX Spectrum
1989	Tiger Road	Amiga, Atari ST, Commodore 64, Amstrad CPC, ZX Spectrum, MS-DOS
1989	Turbo Outrun	Amiga, Commodore 64, ZX Spectrum, Amstrad CPC
1989	Dragons of Flame	Amiga, Amstrad CPC, Atari ST, Commodore 64, FM Towns, Famicom, MS-DOS, PC-9801, ZX Spectrum
1989	Beast Busters	Arcade, Amiga, Atari ST
1989	Crack Down	Atari ST, Amiga, Amstrad CPC, Commodore 64, MS-DOS, ZX Spectrum
1989	Cyber Police ESWAT	Amiga, Atari ST, Amstrad CPC, ZX Spectrum, Commodore 64
1989	Forgotten Worlds	Amiga, Commodore 64, Atari ST, ZX Spectrum, Amstrad CPC
1989	Indiana Jones and the Last Crusade: The Action Game	Amiga, Amstrad CPC, Atari ST, C64, MS-DOS, Game Boy, Game Gear, MSX, Genesis, Master System, NES, ZX Spectrum
1990	Line of Fire	Amiga, Amstrad CPC, Atari ST, Commodore 64, ZX Spectrum
1990	Black Tiger	Amiga, Atari ST, Commodore 64, Amstrad CPC, ZX Spectrum
1990	Bonanza Bros	Amiga, Commodore 64, Atari ST, ZX Spectrum, Amstrad CPC
1990	California Games II	Amiga, Atari ST, MS-DOS, Master System, SNES
1990	E-Motion	Amiga, Amstrad CPC, Atari ST, Commodore 64, Game Boy, MS-DOS, ZX Spectrum
1990	Mega Twins	Amiga, Atari ST
1990	Michael Jackson's Moonwalker	Amiga, Amstrad CPC, Atari ST, Commodore 64, MS-DOS, MSX, ZX Spectrum
1990	Murder!	Amiga, Amiga, Atari ST, DOS
1990	Strider II	Amiga, Amstrad CPC, Atari ST, Commodore 64, Game Gear, Master System, Genesis, ZX Spectrum
1991	Gauntlet III: The Final Quest	Amiga, Amstrad CPC, Atari ST, Commodore 64, ZX Spectrum
1991	Alien Storm	Amiga, Atari ST, Commodore 64, ZX Spectrum, Amstrad CPC
1991	Another World	Amiga, Atari ST
1991	Cruise for a Corpse	Amiga, Atari ST, MS-DOS
1991	James Pond 2	Game Gear, Master System
1991	Mercs	Amstrad CPC, Commodore 64
1991	Out Run Europa	Amiga, Amstrad CPC, Atari ST, Commodore 64, Game Gear, iOS, Master System, ZX Spectrum
1991	Final Fight	Amiga, Atari ST, Commodore 64, ZX Spectrum, Amstrad CPC
1991	Shadow Dancer	Commodore 64, Amiga, ZX Spectrum, Amstrad CPC, Atari ST
1991	Shadow Sorcerer	Amiga, Atari ST, MS-DOS
1992	Olympic Gold	Game Gear, Genesis, Master System
1992	Flashback	Amiga, Acorn Archimedes, Mega Drive/Genesis, MS-DOS, PC-98, SNES, Sega CD, FM Towns, 3DO, CD-i, Jaguar
1992	Championship Hockey	Master System, Game Gear
1992	Super Kick Off	Master System, Game Boy, Genesis, SNES
1992	Putty	Amiga, SNES, CD32
1993	James Pond 3	Game Gear, Super Nintendo Entertainment System
1993	Winter Olympics	Amiga, Genesis, Game Boy, SNES, Game Gear, MS-DOS, Master System
1993	Star Wars	Master System, Game Gear
1994	Road Rash	Master System, Game Gear
1994	The Incredible Hulk	SNES, Genesis, Master System, Game Gear
1994	Power Drive	Amiga, CD32, Game Gear, MS-DOS, Genesis, SNES
1994	World Cup Golf: Professional Edition	PlayStation, Sega Saturn, 3DO, CD-i, MS-DOS
1994	World Cup Golf: Hyatt Dorado Beach	32X
1994	World Cup USA '94	Genesis, Sega CD, SNES, Master System, MS-DOS, Amiga, Game Gear, Game Boy
1994	Dominus	MS-DOS
1994	Hurricanes	SNES, Sega Genesis, Game Gear
1995	Fever Pitch Soccer	SNES, Genesis, Jaguar
1995	Izzy's Quest for the Olympic Rings	Sega Genesis, Super Nintendo Entertainment System
1995	Mega Man	Game Gear
1996	Izzy's Adventure	Windows 95, Windows 3.1
1996	Johnny Bazookatone	3DO, MS-DOS, PlayStation, Saturn
1996	Olympic Soccer	PlayStation, Sega Saturn, DOS, 3DO
1996	Olympic Summer Games	PlayStation, 3DO
1996	Shellshock	PlayStation, Sega Saturn
1996	Duke Nukem 3D	MS-DOS
