= Zero the Kamikaze Squirrel =

1994 video game

- Cover art for the Genesis version
- Developer: Iguana Entertainment
- Publishers: Sunsoft: NS, PS, XB; WW: Ratalaika Games
- Directors: Neill Glancy; Team Iguana
- Designers: Neill Glancy; Team Zero
- Composer: Rick Fox (as Fox Productions)
- Platforms: Sega Genesis; Super NES; Nintendo Switch; PlayStation 4 PlayStation 5 Xbox One; Xbox Series X/S
- Release: October 1994: Genesis; NA: October 1994; EU: July 1995 Super NES; NA: November 1994 Switch, PS4, PS5, Xbox One, Series X/S; WW: October 4, 2024
- Genre: Platform
- Mode: Single-player

Zero the Kamikaze Squirrel, released years later in Japan as Zero: High Flying Squirrel, (Note: Japanese: ゼロ ハイフライング スクワール, Hepburn: Zero: Hai Furaingu Sukuwaaru) is a video game developed by Iguana Entertainment and published by Sunsoft. It is a spin-off/sequel of the Aero the Acro-Bat series. The game was released in 1994 for the Sega Genesis in October and Super NES in November, along with the release of Aero the Acro-Bat 2. A PAL region release for Mega Drive was in July 1995.

The main star is Zero, Aero's rival from the previous games. A remake for the Game Boy Advance was planned in 2003, but it was cancelled. The game was re-released in October 2024 for Nintendo Switch, PlayStation 4, PlayStation 5, Xbox One and Xbox Series X/S by Ratalaika Games.

== Plot ==
During the events of Aero the Acro-Bat 2, Zero receives a telegram from his girlfriend Amy telling him that an evil lumberjack named Jacques Le Sheets is deforesting their homeland Stony Forest to produce counterfeit money and has also captured her father. Ignoring Edgar Ektor's protests, Zero decides to put a stop to Le Sheets. Upon arriving at the island, Zero's plane is shot down and crashes on the beach, so he starts making his way to the forest on foot. During his journey, Zero learns that Amy has also been captured after an unsuccessful attempt to save her father by herself. At the paper factory, Zero fights Le Sheets and pursues him on a flying ship. Aboard the ship, Zero finds that the mastermind is none other than Edgar Ektor. After defeating Ektor with Amy's assistance, the two squirrels parachute safely away, while Ektor's ship crashes into a cliff.

== Development ==
While David Siller was drawing and designing the concept art for Aero the Acro-Bat, his son Justin introduced a character who went up to the same level as Aero and put his thoughts on paper. Using the traits and sketches, it took a year to turn the concept character Zero into a digitized sprite. Siller submitted his proposal to Sunsoft and they approved it. The plot was based on the character animation. Some of the enemy boss sprites were rendered with 3-D Studio. The audio was based on a number of traditional Japanese melodies and sounds and incorporated a rock n' roll soundtrack. A number of ideas from the original concept were left out. The game was finally finished and released by fall. The game was showcased at 1994 Summer Consumer Electronics Show in Chicago.

== Reception ==
Reception

Aggregate score
Aggregator	Score	
Aggregator	Sega Genesis	SNES
GameRankings	71.25%	71.00%

Review scores
Publication	Score	
Publication	Sega Genesis	SNES
AllGame	3/5	2.5/5
Electronic Gaming Monthly	9/10, 8/10, 8/10, 8/10	N/A
Power Unlimited	N/A	79%

The four reviewers of Electronic Gaming Monthly gave the Genesis version high scores, praising Zero's innovative techniques, especially his dive and swoop moves, and the colorful graphics, which one of the reviewers said surpass the Genesis's theoretical color limits. Captain Squideo of GamePro, in contrast, commented that while most of Zero's moves are fun, the dive and swoop moves are too difficult to control. He shared EGM's approval for the game's colorful graphics, but concluded that "difficult controls make this martial arts squirrel less than an instant superstar". He made similar remarks of the SNES version, which he described as "identical" to the Genesis version, but this time concluded Zero the Kamikaze Squirrel to be an overall good game despite its drawbacks. Power Unlimited gave a more negative review criticizing the plot being weak, described the controls as "incomprehensible" and "almost impossible to reach" levels.

== See also ==
- Aero the Acro-Bat
- Aero the Acro-Bat 2
