= Infiltrator II =

1987 video game

- Developers: Chris Gray Enterprises; Eastridge Technology (NES)
- Publisher: Mindscape
- Designer: Chris Gray
- Artist: Nick Gray
- Composer: Paul Butler
- Platforms: Apple II, Commodore 64, MS-DOS, NES
- Release: 1987
- Genre: Combat flight simulator
- Mode: Single-player

Infiltrator II (shown as Infiltrator Part II: The Next Day in-game and published as Infiltrator on the NES) is a video game developed by Chris Gray Enterprises and released in 1987 by Mindscape.

== Gameplay ==
Infiltrator II is a game in which the player pilots a Gizmo DHX2 helicopter and must enter enemy air space to infiltrate their ground facility.

== Reception ==
M. Evan Brooks reviewed the game for Computer Gaming World, and stated that "While it is a credible job overall, this reviewer's hesitancy in offering a recommendation is that the product is more difficult than the normal arcade product. Given that difficulty, when compared against the likes of Gunship, it obviously falls short in both realism and replay value. If one is more inclined towards the arcade spectrum, however, Infiltrator II should fill the bill."
