= Island Peril =

1996 video game

- Developer: Electric Fantasies
- Publisher: Atlantean Interactive Games
- Platform: MS-DOS
- Release: April 1996
- Genre: First-person shooter
- Mode: Single-player

Island Peril is a first-person shooter for MS-DOS developed by Electric Fantasies and published in 1996 by Atlantean Interactive Games.

== Plot ==
The game follows the exploits of Dick Danger as he pursues his kidnapped former girlfriend Samantha "Sweet-Cheeks" Smith from the clutches of the Evil Boss on Lorgina Island.

== Gameplay ==
The gameplay and engine are very similar to Doom. However, instead of fighting demons, the player is set against "Dweebs" and cursed "Body Builders", other enemies included floating tiki heads and voodoo gods on a cartoon-style island setting. The player makes use of eight different weapon each using its own ammunition type. The game also utilizes various Doom assets recolored to a different palette.

== Reception ==
Reception

Review score
Publication	Score
PC Entertainment	3.2/5

PC Entertainment found the plot lame, the gameplay decent and the graphics acceptable.
