= Death Duel (video game) =

1992 video game

- Developer: Punk Development
- Publisher: RazorSoft
- Platform: Sega Genesis
- Release: NA: October 1992
- Genre: First-person shooter
- Mode: Single-player

Death Duel is a first person perspective scrolling shooter published by RazorSoft for the Sega Genesis in 1992. In it, players have to strategically shoot nine alien enemies one at a time using all the weapons they can afford.

== Plot ==
Taking place in the future year 2140, the nine of the ten Galactic Federations had gained unwarranted control over galaxy flight traffic and territory. This has caused the one remaining Federation to suffer a loss of supplies and space pirate attacks. The dispute can only be settled through a warranted duel with the Federation's one dualist to fight against the collective nine alien dualists representing the nine Galactic Federations in control of the space traffic ways, otherwise known as The Super 9's. The player assumes the role of Barrett Jade, a mecha pilot to win back the space ways and duel against the nine other duelists.

== Gameplay ==
Players start the game off with their first duel with a set number of ammunition for their weapons; the player's robot has a total of three weapons indicated by all three buttons on the controller. Once the player completes the duel, they go through a type of Bonus Stage that qualifies them for the next duel as well as increases their score and money. Players can then purchase more ammunition or new weapons for their robot at a local shop.

Players must time their attacks and aim precisely for key locations of their opponent's body. Some enemies can regenerate missing parts of their body (including their head) and some enemies depend on particular mechanical parts to evade fire. If the player runs out of ammunition for all their weapons before the duel is over, they will lose a life and restart the duel over (with the same amount of ammunition they started the duel with). If the duel timer runs out before the duel ends, the player loses a life and restarts the duel.
