= Into the Void (video game) =

1997 video game

- Developer: Adrenalin Entertainment
- Publisher: Playmates Interactive
- Platform: DOS
- Release: NA: April 16, 1997; EU: 1997
- Genres: 4X, strategy
- Modes: Single-player, multiplayer

Into the Void is a video game developed by American studio Adrenalin Entertainment and published by Playmates Interactive Entertainment for DOS in 1997.

== Gameplay ==
Into the Void is a science fiction turn-based strategy game in which the player colonizes planets and destroys rival civilizations to establish an empire.

== Reception ==
Next Generation reviewed the PC version of the game, rating it three stars out of five, and stated "While it doesn't break a whole lot of new ground, Into the Void is a solid enough game that should please most."
