= List of Sega Genesis games =

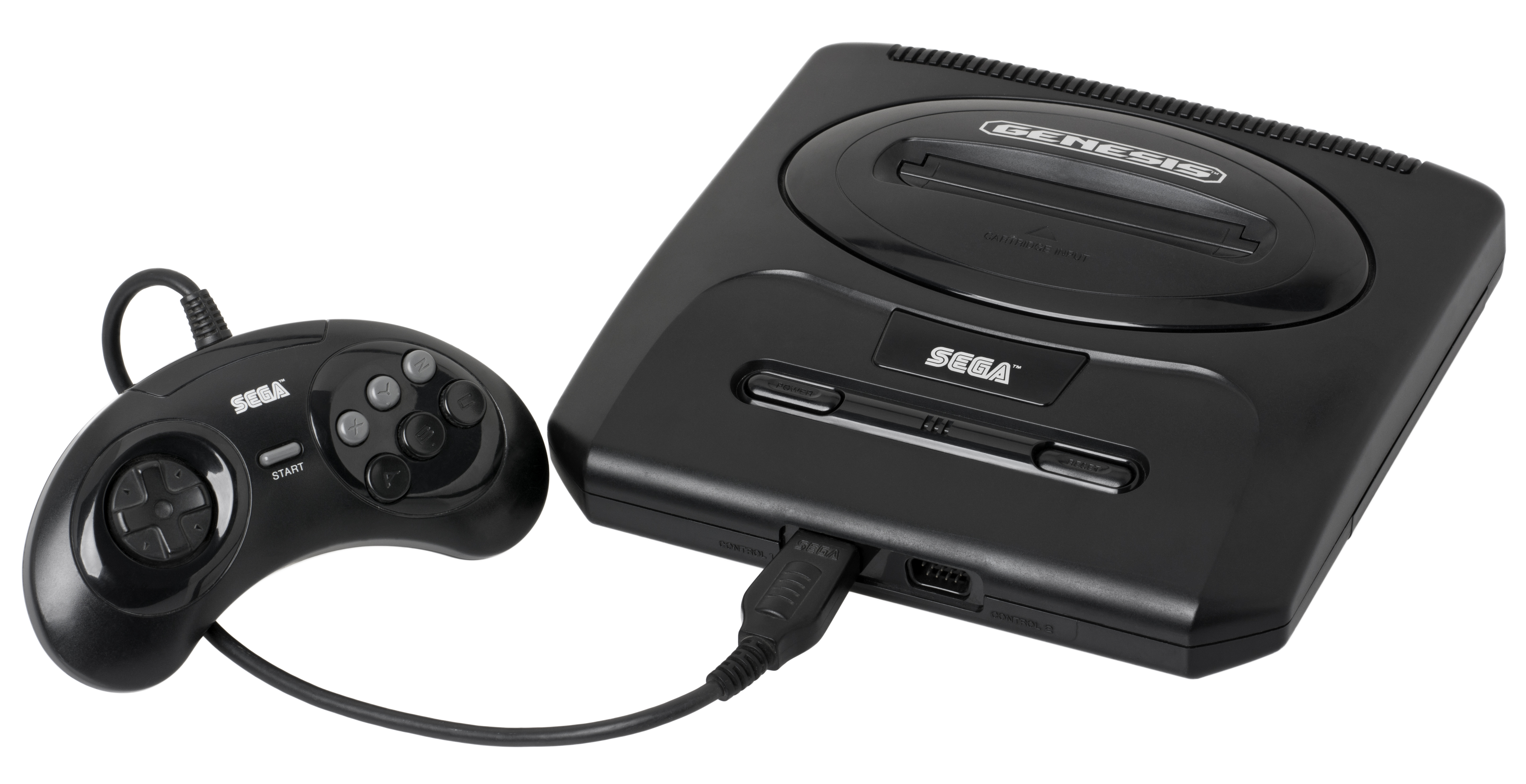
Sega Genesis model 2, released in North America in 1993

The Sega Genesis, known as the Mega Drive in regions outside of North America, is a 16-bit video game console that was designed and produced by Sega. First released in Japan on October 29, 1988, in North America on August 1989, and in PAL regions in 1990, the Genesis is Sega's third console and the successor to the Master System. The system supports a library of 878 (Note: This number is always up to date by this script.) officially licensed games created both by Sega and a wide array of third-party publishers and delivered on ROM cartridges. It can also play Master System games when the separately sold Power Base Converter is installed. The Sega Genesis also sported numerous peripherals, including the Sega CD and 32X, several network services, and multiple first-party and third-party variations of the console that focused on extending its functionality. The console and its games continue to be popular among fans, collectors, video game music fans, and emulation enthusiasts. Licensed third party re-releases of the console are still being produced, and several indie game developers continue to produce games for it. Many games have also been re-released in compilations for newer consoles and offered for download on various digital distribution services, such as Virtual Console, Xbox Live Arcade, PlayStation Network, and Steam.

The Genesis library was initially modest, but eventually grew to contain games to appeal to all types of players. The initial pack-in title was Altered Beast, which was later replaced with Sonic the Hedgehog. Top sellers included Sonic the Hedgehog, its sequel Sonic the Hedgehog 2, and Disney's Aladdin. During development for the console, Sega Enterprises in Japan focused on developing action games while Sega of America was tasked with developing sports games. A large part of the appeal of the Genesis library during the console's lifetime was the arcade-based experience of its games, as well as more difficult entries such as Ecco the Dolphin and sports games such as Joe Montana Football. Compared to its competition, Sega advertised to an older audience by hosting more mature games, including the uncensored version of Mortal Kombat.

Titles listed do not include releases for the Sega CD and 32X add-ons, or titles released through the online service Sega Meganet in Japan. Included in this list are titles not licensed by Sega, including releases in Taiwan by several developers such as Gamtec, as well as releases by Accolade before being licensed following the events of Sega v. Accolade. This list also includes titles developed by unlicensed third-party developers after the discontinuation of the Genesis, such as Pier Solar and the Great Architects.

A few games were only released exclusively on the Sega Channel subscription service, which was active from 1994 to 1998, in the US. This means that, whilst cartridges were officially released for use on PAL and Japanese consoles, they were unavailable physically in the US, with an even smaller number of games exclusive to the service and never released physically in any region. While few games were released this way, some of them are considered to be staples in the Genesis library, such as Pulseman and Mega Man: The Wily Wars.

Region code guide
Regions released	Region description
JP (Japan)	Japanese (NTSC-J) format release
NA (North America)	North America and other NTSC territories, besides Japan
PAL	PAL/SECAM territories: much of Europe, Australia, parts of Asia
BR (Brazil)	PAL-M release exclusively in Brazil
KR (South Korea)	NTSC-J release exclusively in South Korea
TW (Taiwan)	NTSC-J release exclusively in Taiwan

== Licensed games ==
Title(s)	Developer(s)	Publisher(s)	Release date			
Title(s)	Developer(s)	Publisher(s)	JP	NA	PAL	Other
3 Ninjas Kick Back	Malibu Interactive	Psygnosis	Unreleased	1994	Unreleased	
688 Attack Sub	MicroProse	Sega	Unreleased	1991	September 1991	
Aaahh!!! Real Monsters	Realtime Associates	Viacom New Media	Unreleased	1995	November 1995	
Aah! Harimanada	Sega	Sega	September 3, 1993	Unreleased	Unreleased	
A Ressha de Ikō MD	M.N.M Software	Sega	April 10, 1992	Unreleased	Unreleased	
The Addams Family	Ocean Software	Flying Edge	Unreleased	October 1993	November 1993	
Addams Family Values	Ocean Software	Ocean Software	Unreleased	Unreleased	May 1995	
Advanced Daisenryaku: Deutsch Dengeki Sakusen	Sega	Sega	June 17, 1991	Unreleased	Unreleased	
The Adventures of Batman & Robin	Clockwork Tortoise	Sega	Unreleased	May 1995	July 14, 1995	
The Adventures of Mighty Max	WJS Design	Ocean Software	Unreleased	February 1995	November 1994	
The Adventures of Rocky and Bullwinkle and Friends	Imagineering	Absolute Entertainment	Unreleased	September 1993	Unreleased	
Aero the Acro-Bat	Iguana Entertainment	Sunsoft	Unreleased	October 1993	March 10, 1995	
Aero the Acro-Bat 2	Iguana Entertainment	Sunsoft	Unreleased	January 1995	July 1995	
Aerobiz	Koei	Koei	November 1, 1992	April 1993	Unreleased	
Aerobiz Supersonic	Koei	Koei	February 18, 1994	January 1995	Unreleased	
After Burner II	Dempa Micomsoft	Dempa Shimbunsha^{JP} Sega^{WW}	March 23, 1990	July 1990	1990	
Air Buster Aero Blasters^{JP}	Kaneko	Kaneko	January 31, 1991	February 1991	Unreleased	
Air Diver	Copya System	Asmik^{JP} Seismic Software^{NA}	March 9, 1990	April 1990	Unreleased	
Aladdin	Virgin Games	Sega	November 12, 1993	October 19, 1993	October 22, 1993	
Alex Kidd in the Enchanted Castle	Sega	Sega	February 10, 1989	January 1990	1990	
Alien 3	Probe Software	Arena Entertainment	Unreleased	October 1992	October 1992	
Alien Soldier	Treasure	Sega	February 24, 1995	1995 (Note: This game was exclusively released via the Sega Channel online game service.)	May 26, 1995	
Alien Storm	Sega	Sega	June 28, 1991	July 1991	1991	
Alisia Dragoon	Game Arts	Sega^{WW} Game Arts^{JP}	April 24, 1992	March 1992	June 24, 1992	
Altered Beast	Sega	Sega	November 27, 1988	August 1989	September 1990	
American Gladiators	Imagitec Design	GameTek	Unreleased	January 1993	Unreleased	
Andre Agassi Tennis	TecMagik	TecMagik	Unreleased	January 1993	August 1993	
Animaniacs	Konami	Konami	Unreleased	November 1994	December 1994	
Another World Out of This World^{NA}	Interplay Productions	Virgin Games	Unreleased	March 1993	May 1993	
The Aquatic Games Starring James Pond and The Aquabats	Vectordean	Electronic Arts	Unreleased	1992	October 15, 1992	
Arcade Classics	Al Baker & Associates	Sega	Unreleased	July 1996	July 19, 1996	
Arch Rivals	Arc Developments	Flying Edge	Unreleased	1992	November 12, 1992	
Arcus Odyssey	Wolf Team	Wolf Team^{JP} Renovation Products^{NA}	June 14, 1991	September 1991	Unreleased	
Ariel the Little Mermaid	BlueSky Software	Sega	Unreleased	December 1992	December 1992	
Arnold Palmer Tournament Golf Ozaki Naomichi no Super Masters^{JP}	Sega	Sega	September 9, 1989	October 1989	January 1991	
Arrow Flash	I.T.L	Sega^{JP/PAL} Renovation Products^{NA}	October 20, 1990	December 1990	1991	
Art Alive!	Western Technologies; FarSight Technologies	Sega	March 27, 1992	1991	March 1992	
Art of Fighting	Sega	Sega	January 14, 1994	September 1994	1994	
Asterix and the Great Rescue	Core Design	Sega	Unreleased	June 1994	October 1993	
Asterix and the Power of the Gods	Core Design	Sega	Unreleased	Unreleased	April 21, 1995	
Atomic Robo-Kid	UPL	Treco	December 14, 1990	October 1990	Unreleased	
Atomic Runner Chelnov^{JP}	Data East	Data East^{NA/JP} Sega^{PAL}	October 16, 1992	July 1992	1992	
ATP Tour Championship Tennis	SIMS	Sega	Unreleased	March 1995	February 10, 1995	
Australian Rugby League	I-Space Interactive	EA Sports	Unreleased	Unreleased	December 29, 1995	
Awesome Possum... Kicks Dr. Machino's Butt	Tengen	Tengen	December 25, 1993	November 1993	Unreleased	
Ayrton Senna's Super Monaco GP II	Sega	Sega	July 17, 1992	September 1992	July 1992	
B.O.B. Space Funky B.O.B.^{JP}	Foley Hi-Tech Systems	Electronic Arts^{WW} Electronic Arts Victor^{JP}	November 19, 1993	September 1993	August 1993	
Back to the Future Part III	Probe Software	Arena Entertainment^{NA} Image Works^{PAL}	Unreleased	1991	October 7, 1992	
Bahamut Senki	Sega	Sega	March 8, 1991	Unreleased	Unreleased	
Ball Jacks	Namco	Namco	April 23, 1993	Unreleased	June 1993	
Ballz	PF.Magic	Accolade	Unreleased	October 5, 1994	September 23, 1994	
Barbie: Super Model	Tahoe Software Productions	Hi Tech Expressions	Unreleased	1993	Unreleased	
Barkley Shut Up and Jam!	Accolade	Accolade	Unreleased	March 1994	March 8, 1994	
Barkley Shut Up and Jam 2	Accolade	Accolade	Unreleased	April 1995	Unreleased	
Barney's Hide & Seek Game	Realtime Associates	Sega	Unreleased	1993	Unreleased	
Bass Masters Classic	Black Pearl Software	Black Pearl Software	Unreleased	1995	Unreleased	
Bass Masters Classic: Pro Edition	Black Pearl Software	Black Pearl Software	Unreleased	November 1996	Unreleased	
Batman	Sunsoft	Sunsoft^{JP/NA} Sega^{PAL}	July 27, 1990	June 1991	July 1992	
Batman Forever	Probe Entertainment	Acclaim Entertainment	October 27, 1995	September 7, 1995	September 7, 1995	
Batman Returns	Malibu Interactive	Sega	February 19, 1993	October 1992	December 10, 1992	
Batman: Revenge of the Joker	Ringler Studios	Sunsoft	Unreleased	November 1992	Unreleased	
Battle Golfer Yui	Santos	Sega	February 15, 1991	Unreleased	Unreleased	
Battle Mania: Daiginjō	Vic Tokai	Vic Tokai	December 24, 1993	Unreleased	Unreleased	
Battle Master	Nick Pelling	Arena Entertainment	Unreleased	November 1991	Unreleased	
Battle Squadron	Cope-Com	Electronic Arts	Unreleased	1990	January 1991	
BattleTech	Malibu Interactive	Extreme Entertainment Group	Unreleased	September 1994	Unreleased	
Battletoads	Arc System Works	Tradewest^{NA} Sega^{JP/PAL}	March 26, 1993	March 1993	June 1993	
Battletoads & Double Dragon: The Ultimate Team	Rare	Tradewest	Unreleased	1993	Unreleased	
Beast Wrestler	Riot	Riot^{JP} Renovation Products^{NA}	November 29, 1991	March 1992	Unreleased	
Beauty and the Beast: Belle's Quest	Software Creations	Sunsoft	Unreleased	1993	Unreleased	
Beauty and the Beast: Roar of the Beast	Software Creations	Sunsoft	Unreleased	1993	Unreleased	
Beavis and Butt-Head	Radical Entertainment	Viacom New Media	Unreleased	October 1994	August 14, 1995	
The Berenstain Bears' Camping Adventure	Realtime Associates	Sega	Unreleased	1994	Unreleased	
Best of the Best: Championship Karate The Kick Boxing^{JP}	Loriciel	Micro World^{JP} Electro Brain^{NA}	January 29, 1993	June 1993	Unreleased	
Beyond Oasis The Story of Thor^{JP/PAL}	Ancient	Sega	December 9, 1994	March 1995	March 1, 1995	
Bill Walsh College Football	High Score Productions	EA Sports	Unreleased	August 1993	September 1993	
Bill Walsh College Football '95	High Score Productions	EA Sports	Unreleased	August 1994	Unreleased	
Bimini Run	Microsmiths	Nuvision Entertainment	Unreleased	February 1991	Unreleased	
Bio-Hazard Battle Crying: Aseimei Sensō^{JP}	Sega	Sega	October 30, 1992	December 1992	January 1993	
Bishōjo Senshi Sailor Moon	Arc System Works; TNS	Ma-Ba	July 8, 1994	Unreleased	Unreleased	
Blades of Vengeance	Beam Software	Electronic Arts	Unreleased	December 1993	December 1993	
Blaster Master 2	Software Creations	Sunsoft	Unreleased	June 1993	Unreleased	
Blockout	Electronic Arts	Electronic Arts^{WW} Sega^{JP}	November 1, 1991	1991	July 1991	
Bloodshot Battle Frenzy^{GER/NA}	Domark	Domark	Unreleased	1995	January 1995	
Blue Almanac	Hot-B	Kodansha	June 22, 1991	Unreleased	Unreleased	
Body Count	Probe Software	Sega	Unreleased	1995	July 15, 1994	
Bonanza Bros.	Sega	Sega	May 17, 1991	November 1991	November 14, 1991	
Bonkers	Sega Interactive Development Division	Sega	Unreleased	1994	February 10, 1995	
Boogerman: A Pick and Flick Adventure	Interplay Productions	Interplay Productions	Unreleased	November 18, 1994	December 2, 1994	
Boxing Legends of the Ring	Sculptured Software	Electro Brain	Unreleased	October 1993	Unreleased	
Bram Stoker's Dracula	Traveller's Tales	Sony Imagesoft	Unreleased	1993	November 26, 1993	
BreakThru!	Artech Digital Entertainment	Spectrum HoloByte	Unreleased	July 1996 (Note: This game was exclusively released via the Sega Channel online game service.)	Unreleased	
Brett Hull Hockey '95	Radical Entertainment	Accolade	Unreleased	December 1994	Unreleased	
Brian Lara Cricket	Audiogenic Software	Codemasters	Unreleased	Unreleased	May 12, 1995	
Brian Lara Cricket '96 Shane Warne Cricket^{AUS}	Audiogenic Software	Codemasters	Unreleased	Unreleased	May 17, 1996^{EU} June 24, 1996^{AUS}	
Brutal: Paws of Fury	GameTek	GameTek	Unreleased	1994	1994	
Bubba 'n' Stix	Core Design	Core Design	Unreleased	July 1994	July 1, 1994	
Bubble and Squeak	Audiogenic Software	Sunsoft	Unreleased	March 1994	January 1995	
Bubsy in Claws Encounters of the Furred Kind	Al Baker & Associates	Accolade	Unreleased	July 1993	August 1993	
Bubsy II	Accolade	Accolade	Unreleased	October 15, 1994	October 28, 1994	
Buck Rogers: Countdown to Doomsday	Strategic Simulations	Electronic Arts	Unreleased	December 1991	April 1992	
Budokan: The Martial Spirit	Electronic Arts	Electronic Arts	Unreleased	June 1990	November 1990	
Bugs Bunny in Double Trouble	Atod; Probe Entertainment; Climax	Sega^{NA/PAL} Tec Toy^{BR}	Unreleased	August 1996	September 5, 1996	October 1996^{BR}
Bulls vs. Blazers and the NBA Playoffs	Electronic Arts	EA Sports^{WW} Electronic Arts Victor^{JP}	July 30, 1993	1993	1993	
Bulls vs Lakers and the NBA Playoffs	Electronic Arts	Electronic Arts Sports Network^{WW} Electronic Arts Victor^{JP}	April 2, 1993	May 1992	August 1992	
Burning Force	Namco	Namco	October 19, 1990	1990	December 1991	
Cadash	Cyclone System	Taito	Unreleased	June 1992	Unreleased	
Caesars Palace	The Illusions Gaming Company	Virgin Games	Unreleased	1993	Unreleased	
Cal Ripken Jr. Baseball	Acme Interactive	Mindscape	Unreleased	1992	Unreleased	
Caliber .50	Visco	Mentrix Software	Unreleased	December 1991	Unreleased	
California Games	Novotrade	Sega	Unreleased	February 1992	December 1991	
Cannon Fodder	PanelComp	Virgin Interactive Entertainment	Unreleased	Unreleased	January 6, 1995	
Captain America and The Avengers	Data East; ISCO; Opera House	Data East^{NA} Sega^{PAL}	Unreleased	December 1992	1993	
Captain Planet and the Planeteers	NovaLogic	Sega	Unreleased	Unreleased	1993	
Castle of Illusion Starring Mickey Mouse	Sega	Sega	November 21, 1990	December 1990	March 1991	
Castlevania: Bloodlines Castlevania: The New Generation^{PAL}	Konami	Konami	March 18, 1994	March 17, 1994	March 20, 1994	
Centurion: Defender of Rome	Bits of Magic	Electronic Arts	Unreleased	July 1991	July 1991	
Chakan: The Forever Man	Extended Play	Sega	Unreleased	November 1992	February 1993	
Championship Bowling Boogie Woogie Bowling^{JP}	Soft Machine	Mentrix Software^{NA} Visco^{JP}	December 17, 1993	February 1993	Unreleased	
Championship Pool	Bitmasters	Mindscape	Unreleased	1993	Unreleased	
Championship Pro-Am	Rare	Tradewest	Unreleased	1992	Unreleased	
Champions World Class Soccer	Park Place Productions	Flying Edge^{WW} Acclaim Entertainment^{JP}	June 24, 1994	1994	May 19, 1994	
The Chaos Engine Soldiers of Fortune^{NA}	The Bitmap Brothers	Spectrum HoloByte^{NA} MicroProse^{PAL}	Unreleased	November 1993	July 1, 1994	
Chase H.Q. II Super H.Q.^{JP}	I.T.L	Taito	October 23, 1992	February 1993	Unreleased	
Cheese Cat-Astrophe Starring Speedy Gonzales	Cryo Interactive	Sega	Unreleased	Unreleased	May 5, 1995	
The Chessmaster	Mindscape	Mindscape	Unreleased	June 1996	Unreleased	
Chester Cheetah: Too Cool to Fool	System Vision	Kaneko	Unreleased	January 1993	Unreleased	
Chester Cheetah: Wild Wild Quest	Kaneko	Kaneko	Unreleased	January 1994	Unreleased	
Chibi Maruko-chan: Waku Waku Shopping	Namco	Namco	January 14, 1992	Unreleased	Unreleased	
Chi Chi's Pro Challenge Golf Top Pro Golf 2^{JP}	Soft Vision	Soft Vision^{JP} Virgin Games^{NA}	June 25, 1993	July 1993	Unreleased	
Chiki Chiki Boys	Visco	Sega	October 16, 1992	1993	1993	
Chōkyūkai Miracle Nine	Sega	Sega	July 21, 1995	Unreleased	Unreleased	
Chuck Rock	Core Design	Virgin Games	Unreleased	January 1992	August 1992	
Chuck Rock II: Son of Chuck	Core Design	Virgin Games^{NA/JP} Core Design^{PAL}	June 24, 1994	October 1993	October 1993	
ClayFighter	Ringler Studios	Interplay Productions	Unreleased	1994	January 1995	
Cliffhanger	Malibu Interactive	Sony Imagesoft	Unreleased	November 1993	February 4, 1994	
Clue	Sculptured Software	Parker Brothers	Unreleased	January 1993	Unreleased	
Coach K College Basketball	Hitmen Productions	EA Sports	Unreleased	February 1995	Unreleased	
College Football USA 96	High Score Entertainment	EA Sports	Unreleased	1995	Unreleased	
College Football USA 97	Tiburon Entertainment; High Score Entertainment	EA Sports	Unreleased	October 1996	Unreleased	
College Football's National Championship	BlueSky Software	Sega	Unreleased	August 1994	Unreleased	
College Football's National Championship II	BlueSky Software	Sega	Unreleased	1995	Unreleased	
College Slam	Iguana UK	Acclaim Entertainment	Unreleased	February 1996	Unreleased	
Columns	Sega	Sega	June 30, 1990	September 1990	1990	
Columns III	Sega; Minato Giken	Sega^{JP} Vic Tokai^{NA}	October 15, 1993	1994	Unreleased	
Combat Cars	Scangames	Accolade	Unreleased	June 1994	July 8, 1994	
Comix Zone	Sega Technical Institute	Sega	September 1, 1995	July 1995	October 6, 1995	
Contra: Hard Corps Probotector^{PAL}	Konami	Konami	September 15, 1994	September 14, 1994	October 11, 1994	
Cool Spot	Virgin Games	Virgin Games	February 18, 1994	April 1993	June 1993	
Corporation Cyber-Cop^{NA}	Core Design	Virgin Games	Unreleased	June 1992	October 29, 1992	
Cosmic Spacehead	Supersonic Software	Codemasters	Unreleased	November 1993	November 1993	
Crack Down	Hot-B	Sega^{JP/PAL} Sage's Creation^{NA}	December 20, 1990	March 1991	1991	
Crayon Shin-chan: Arashi o Yobu Enji	SIMS	Ma-Ba	March 11, 1994	Unreleased	Unreleased	
Cross Fire Super Airwolf^{JP}	A.I	Kyugo	March 29, 1991	1991	Unreleased	
Crüe Ball	NuFX	Electronic Arts^{WW} Electronic Arts Victor^{JP}	December 26, 1993	November 1992	November 19, 1992	
Crusader of Centy Shin Sōseiki Ragnacënty^{JP} Soleil^{PAL}	Nextech	Sega^{JP/PAL} Atlus^{NA}	June 17, 1994	March 1995	February 10, 1995	
Crystal's Pony Tale	Artech Studios	Sega	Unreleased	October 1994	Unreleased	
Curse	Micronet	Micronet	December 23, 1989	Unreleased	Unreleased	
Cutie Suzuki no Ringside Angel	Copya System	Asmik	December 12, 1990	Unreleased	Unreleased	
Cutthroat Island	Software Creations	Acclaim Entertainment	Unreleased	1995	February 23, 1996	
Cyberball	Sega	Sega	July 28, 1990	August 1990	1990	
Cyborg Justice	Novotrade	Sega	Unreleased	April 1993	April 1993	
Daffy Duck in Hollywood	Psionic Systems	Sega	Unreleased	Unreleased	March 14, 1995	
Dahna: Megami Tanjō	IGS	IGS	December 20, 1991	Unreleased	Unreleased	
Dangerous Seed	Namco	Namco	December 18, 1990	Unreleased	Unreleased	
Dark Castle	Artech Studios	Electronic Arts	Unreleased	1991	October 16, 1991	
Darwin 4081	Sega	Sega	April 7, 1990	Unreleased	Unreleased	
Dashin' Desperadoes	Data East	Data East	Unreleased	September 1993	Unreleased	
David Crane's Amazing Tennis	FarSight Technologies	Absolute Entertainment	Unreleased	May 1993	Unreleased	
David Robinson's Supreme Court	Acme Interactive	Sega	July 10, 1992	1992	July 1992	
Davis Cup World Tour Davis Cup Tennis^{NA/JP}	Loriciel	Tengen	February 25, 1994	July 1993	October 1993	
Daze Before Christmas	Funcom	Sunsoft	Unreleased	Unreleased	1994^{AUS}	
Deadly Moves Power Athlete^{JP}	System Vision	Kaneko	December 11, 1992	January 1993	Unreleased	
The Death and Return of Superman	Blizzard Entertainment	Sunsoft^{NA} Acclaim Entertainment^{PAL}	Unreleased	January 1995	1995	
Death Duel	Punk Development	RazorSoft	Unreleased	October 1992	Unreleased	
Decap Attack Majikaru Hatto no Buttobi Tābo! Daibōken^{JP}	Vic Tokai	Sega	December 15, 1990	1991	October 9, 1991	
Demolition Man	Alexandria	Acclaim Entertainment	Unreleased	September 1995	September 1995	
Desert Demolition Starring Road Runner and Wile E. Coyote	BlueSky Software	Sega	Unreleased	February 1995	April 21, 1995	
Desert Strike: Return to the Gulf	Electronic Arts	Electronic Arts^{WW} Electronic Arts Victor^{JP}	April 23, 1993	March 1992	March 1992	
Devilish: The Next Possession Bad Omen^{JP}	Aisystem Tokyo	Sage's Creation^{NA} Hot-B^{JP}	April 24, 1992	April 1992	Unreleased	
Dick Tracy	Sega Technical Institute	Sega	March 1, 1991	February 1991	May 1991	
Dick Vitale's "Awesome, Baby!" College Hoops	Time Warner Interactive	Time Warner Interactive	Unreleased	1994	Unreleased	
Dino Dini's Soccer	Dino Dini	Virgin Interactive Entertainment	Unreleased	Unreleased	December 1994	
Dino Land	Wolf Team	Wolf Team^{JP} Renovation Products^{NA}	August 2, 1991	September 1991	Unreleased	
A Dinosaur's Tale	Funcom	Hi Tech Entertainment	Unreleased	1993	Unreleased	
Dinosaurs for Hire	Sega Interactive Development Division	Sega	Unreleased	October 1993	Unreleased	
DJ Boy	Kaneko	Sega^{JP/PAL} Kaneko^{NA}	May 19, 1990	1990	May 1992	
Donald in Maui Mallard	Disney Interactive	Sega	Unreleased	1997	November 24, 1995	
Doraemon: Yume Dorobō to 7-nin no Gozans	G-Sat	Sega	March 26, 1993	Unreleased	Unreleased	
Double Clutch	BGS Development	Sega	Unreleased	Unreleased	June 1993	
Double Dragon	Software Creations	Ballistic	Unreleased	February 1992	May 6, 1992	
Double Dragon II: The Revenge	Palsoft	Palsoft	December 20, 1991	Unreleased	Unreleased	
Double Dragon 3: The Arcade Game	Software Creations	Flying Edge	Unreleased	1993	January 1993	
Double Dragon V: The Shadow Falls	Leland Interactive Media	Tradewest	Unreleased	August 5, 1994	Unreleased	
Double Dribble: The Playoff Edition Hyper Dunk: The Playoff Edition^{JP} HyperDunk^{PAL}	Konami	Konami	March 4, 1994	April 27, 1994	April 15, 1994	
Dr. Robotnik's Mean Bean Machine Puyo Puyo^{JP}	Compile	Sega	December 18, 1992	December 1993	January 21, 1994	
Dragon Ball Z: Buyū Retsuden Dragon Ball Z: L'Appel du Destin^{FR/ESP}	Bandai	Bandai	April 1, 1994	Unreleased	June 1994^{FR/ESP}	
Dragon Slayer: Eiyū Densetsu	Sega Falcom	Sega	September 16, 1994	Unreleased	Unreleased	
Dragon Slayer: Eiyū Densetsu II	Sega Falcom	Sega	January 20, 1995	Unreleased	Unreleased	
Dragon's Eye Plus: Shanghai III	Home Data	Home Data	November 2, 1991	Unreleased	Unreleased	
Dragon's Fury Devil Crash MD^{JP}	Technosoft	Technosoft^{JP} Tengen^{WW}	October 10, 1991	July 1992	September 24, 1992	
Dragon's Revenge	Tengen	Tengen	December 10, 1993	November 1993	January 14, 1994	
Dragon: The Bruce Lee Story	Virgin Interactive Entertainment	Virgin Interactive Entertainment^{PAL} Acclaim Entertainment^{NA}	Unreleased	1995	September 1994	
The Duel: Test Drive II	Distinctive Software	Ballistic	Unreleased	March 1992	March 25, 1992	
Duke Nukem 3D	Tec Toy	Tec Toy	Unreleased	Unreleased	Unreleased	1998^{BR}
Dune II: Battle for Arrakis Dune: The Battle for Arrakis^{NA}	Westwood Studios	Virgin Interactive Entertainment	Unreleased	May 1, 1994	June 1994	
Dungeons & Dragons: Warriors of the Eternal Sun	Westwood Associates	Sega	Unreleased	August 1992	August 1992	
Dyna Brothers	CRI	CRI	July 24, 1992	Unreleased	Unreleased	
Dyna Brothers 2	CRI	CRI	December 3, 1993	Unreleased	Unreleased	
Dynamite Duke	Hertz	Sega	October 27, 1990	December 1990	April 1991	
Dynamite Headdy	Treasure	Sega	August 5, 1994	September 28, 1994	October 28, 1994	
Earnest Evans	Wolf Team	Renovation Products	Unreleased	March 1992	Unreleased	
Earthworm Jim	Shiny Entertainment	Playmates Interactive Entertainment^{NA} Virgin Interactive Entertainment^{PAL} Takara^{JP}	December 1, 1995 (Note: This game was exclusively released via the Sega Channel online game service.)	October 1994	November 1994	
Earthworm Jim 2	Shiny Entertainment	Playmates Interactive Entertainment^{NA} Virgin Interactive Entertainment^{PAL} Takara^{JP}	September 1996 (Note: This game was exclusively released via the Sega Channel online game service.)	November 15, 1995	December 22, 1995	
Ecco Jr.	Novotrade	Sega	August 16, 1995 (Note: This game was exclusively released via the Sega Channel online game service.)	April 1995	1995^{AUS}	
Ecco the Dolphin	Novotrade	Sega	July 30, 1993	December 1992	January 1993	
Ecco: The Tides of Time	Novotrade	Sega	August 26, 1994	November 1994	November 18, 1994	
El Viento	Wolf Team	Wolf Team^{JP} Renovation Products^{NA}	September 20, 1991	November 1991	Unreleased	
Elemental Master	Technosoft	Technosoft^{JP} Renovation Products^{NA}	December 14, 1990	March 1993	Unreleased	
Eliminate Down	Aprinet	Soft Vision	June 25, 1993	Unreleased	Unreleased	
ESPN Baseball Tonight	Park Place Productions	Sony Imagesoft	Unreleased	June 1994	Unreleased	
ESPN National Hockey Night	Sony Imagesoft	Sony Imagesoft	Unreleased	November 1994	Unreleased	
ESPN SpeedWorld	Sony Imagesoft	Sony Imagesoft	Unreleased	1994	Unreleased	
ESPN Sunday Night NFL	Ringler Studios; Absolute Entertainment	Sony Imagesoft	Unreleased	1994	Unreleased	
ESWAT: City Under Siege	Sega	Sega	July 14, 1990	October 1990	1990	
Eternal Champions	Sega Interactive Development Division	Sega	February 18, 1994	December 1993	January 28, 1994	
European Club Soccer World Trophy Soccer^{NA} J-League Champion Soccer^{JP}	Krisalis Software	Virgin Games^{WW} Game Arts^{JP}	February 26, 1993	1992	August 1992	
Evander Holyfield's "Real Deal" Boxing	Acme Interactive	Sega	October 30, 1992	August 1992	September 24, 1992	
Ex-Mutants	Malibu Interactive	Sega	Unreleased	1992	February 1993	
Exile	Riot	Riot^{JP} Renovation Products^{NA}	December 6, 1991	1991	Unreleased	
Exosquad	Novotrade	Playmates Interactive Entertainment^{NA} Virgin Interactive Entertainment^{PAL}	Unreleased	July 1, 1995	September 1995	
F-15 Strike Eagle II	MicroProse	MicroProse	Unreleased	December 1993	December 1993	
F-22 Interceptor	Lerner Research	Electronic Arts^{WW} Electronic Arts Victor^{JP}	February 12, 1993	November 1991	December 1991	
F-117 Night Storm	Electronic Arts	Electronic Arts^{WW} Electronic Arts Victor^{JP}	May 27, 1994	December 1993	December 1993	
F1 Formula One^{NA}	Lankhor	Domark	Unreleased	November 1993	November 5, 1993	
F1 Circus MD	Micronics	Nichibutsu	December 20, 1991	Unreleased	Unreleased	
F1: World Championship Edition	Peakstar Software	Domark	Unreleased	Unreleased	1995	
The Faery Tale Adventure	New World Computing	Electronic Arts	Unreleased	July 1991	July 1991	
Family Feud	Eurocom	GameTek	Unreleased	1993	Unreleased	
Fantasia	Infogrames	Sega	November 22, 1991	August 1991	1991	
Fantastic Dizzy	Codemasters	Codemasters	Unreleased	1993	December 1993	
Fastest 1	Human Entertainment	Human Entertainment	June 28, 1991	Unreleased	Unreleased	
Fatal Fury: King of Fighters	Gaibrain; Aspect	Takara^{NA} Sega^{JP/PAL}	April 23, 1993	February 1993	April 1993	
Fatal Fury 2	Gaibrain; Aspect	Takara^{NA/JP} Sega^{AUS}	June 24, 1994	May 1994	1994^{AUS}	
Fatal Labyrinth Shi no Meikyuu: Labyrinth of Death^{JP}	Sega	Sega	November 21, 1990 (Note: This game was exclusively released via the Sega Meganet online game service.)	1991	1991	
Fatal Rewind The Killing Game Show^{JP}	Raising Hell Software	Electronic Arts^{WW} Electronic Arts Victor^{JP}	August 20, 1993	1991	November 1991	
Férias Frustradas do Pica-Pau	Tec Toy	Tec Toy	Unreleased	Unreleased	Unreleased	October 1996^{BR}
Ferrari Grand Prix Challenge Nakajima Satoru Kanshū F1 Hero MD^{JP}	Aisystem Tokyo	Varie^{JP} Flying Edge^{WW}	May 15, 1992	1992	September 1992	
Fever Pitch Soccer Head-On Soccer^{NA}	U.S. Gold	U.S. Gold	Unreleased	1995	June 30, 1995	
FIFA International Soccer	Extended Play Productions	EA Sports^{WW} Electronic Arts Victor^{JP}	June 10, 1994	December 1993	December 3, 1993	
FIFA: Road to World Cup 98	XYZ Productions	EA Sports	Unreleased	Unreleased	1997	
FIFA Soccer 95	Extended Play Productions	EA Sports	Unreleased	1994	November 11, 1994	
FIFA Soccer 96	Extended Play Productions	EA Sports	Unreleased	November 1995	November 10, 1995	
FIFA Soccer 97 FIFA 97^{EU}	XYZ Productions	EA Sports	Unreleased	November 1996	November 22, 1996	
Fighting Masters	Aicom; ALU	Treco	December 6, 1991	February 1992	Unreleased	
Final Zone FZ Senki Axis^{JP}	Wolf Team	Wolf Team^{JP} Renovation Products^{NA}	October 12, 1990	December 1990	Unreleased	
Fire Mustang	NMK	Taito	May 31, 1991	Unreleased	Unreleased	
Fire Shark	Toaplan	DreamWorks^{NA} Toaplan^{JP} Sega^{PAL}	November 2, 1990	October 1990	April 1992	
Flashback Flashback: The Quest for Identity^{NA}	Delphine Software International	U.S. Gold^{WW} Sunsoft^{JP}	December 29, 1993	February 20, 1993	June 1993	
Flicky	Sega	Sega	January 1991 (Note: This game was exclusively released via the Sega Meganet online game service.)	1991	1991	
Flink	Psygnosis	Sony Electronic Publishing	Unreleased	Unreleased	November 1994	
The Flintstones	Taito; Santos	Taito^{NA/JP} Sega^{PAL}	November 19, 1993	April 1993	August 6, 1993	
The Flintstones	Foley Hi-Tech	Ocean Software	Unreleased	January 1996	Unreleased	
Foreman For Real	Software Creations	Acclaim Entertainment	October 27, 1995	October 1995	1995	
Forgotten Worlds	Sega	Sega	November 18, 1989	December 1989	1990	
Frank Thomas Big Hurt Baseball	Iguana Entertainment	Acclaim Entertainment	Unreleased	October 1995	1995	
Frogger	Morning Star Multimedia	Majesco	Unreleased	1998	Unreleased	
From TV Animation Slam Dunk: Kyōgō Makkō Taiketsu!	SIMS	Bandai	April 28, 1995	Unreleased	Unreleased	
Fun 'n Games	Leland Interactive Media	Tradewest^{NA} Sony Electronic Publishing^{PAL}	Unreleased	December 1993	October 1994	
Fushigi no Umi no Nadia	Namco	Namco	March 19, 1991	Unreleased	Unreleased	
G-LOC: Air Battle	Probe Software	Sega	February 26, 1993	February 1993	February 1993	
Gadget Twins	Imagitec Design	GameTek	Unreleased	October 1992	Unreleased	
Gaiares	Telenet Japan	Renovation Game^{JP} Renovation Products^{NA}	December 26, 1990	February 1991	Unreleased	
Gain Ground	Sanritsu	Sega^{JP/PAL} Renovation Products^{NA}	January 3, 1991	1991	1991	
Galahad The Legend of Galahad^{PAL}	Traveller's Tales	Electronic Arts	Unreleased	1992	October 21, 1992	
Galaxy Force II	CRI	CRI^{JP} Sega^{WW}	September 13, 1991	January 1992	1992	
Garfield: Caught in the Act	Sega Interactive Development Division	Sega	Unreleased	November 1995	December 1995	
Gargoyles	Disney Interactive	Buena Vista Interactive	Unreleased	November 21, 1995	Unreleased	
Gauntlet IV Gauntlet^{JP}	M2	Tengen	September 17, 1993	September 1993	November 1993	
Gemfire Royal Blood^{JP}	Koei	Koei	June 25, 1992	November 1992	Unreleased	
General Chaos	Game Refuge	Electronic Arts^{WW} Electronic Arts Victor^{JP}	January 14, 1994	August 1993	September 1993	
Generations Lost	Pacific Softscape	Time Warner Interactive	Unreleased	December 1994	November 1994	
Genghis Khan II: Clan of the Gray Wolf Aoki Ōkami to Shiroki Mejika: Genchō Hishi^{JP}	Koei	Koei	March 25, 1993	December 1993	Unreleased	
George Foreman's KO Boxing	Beam Software	Flying Edge	Unreleased	January 1993	April 1993	
Ghostbusters	Sega; Compile	Sega	June 30, 1990	August 1990	December 1990	
Ghouls 'n Ghosts	Sega	Sega	August 3, 1989	October 1989	November 1990	
Gley Lancer	NCS	Masaya	July 17, 1992	Unreleased	Unreleased	
Global Gladiators Mick & Mack as the Global Gladiators^{NA}	Virgin Games	Virgin Games	Unreleased	November 1992	April 1993	
Gods	Graftgold	Mindscape^{NA} PCM Complete^{JP} Accolade^{PAL}	March 26, 1993	1992	December 1993	
Golden Axe	Sega	Sega	December 23, 1989	January 1990	November 1990	
Golden Axe II	Sega	Sega	December 27, 1991	January 1992	1992	
Golden Axe III	Sega	Sega	June 25, 1993	1995	Unreleased	
Goofy's Hysterical History Tour	Absolute Entertainment	Absolute Entertainment	Unreleased	January 1994	Unreleased	
Gōketsuji Ichizoku	Atlus	Atlus	November 18, 1994	Unreleased	Unreleased	
Granada	Wolf Team	Wolf Team^{JP} Renovation Products^{NA}	November 16, 1990	1990	Unreleased	
The Great Circus Mystery Starring Mickey & Minnie	Capcom	Capcom	December 16, 1994	December 1994	Unreleased	
The Great Waldo Search	Radiance Software	THQ	Unreleased	1992	Unreleased	
Greatest Heavyweights	Acme Interactive	Sega	May 27, 1994	December 1993	January 21, 1994	
Greendog: The Beached Surfer Dude!	Interactive Designs	Sega	Unreleased	1992	October 7, 1992	
Grind Stormer V-V^{JP}	Tengen	Tengen	March 25, 1994	April 1994	Unreleased	
Growl	I.T.L	Taito	November 15, 1991	1991	Unreleased	
Gunship	Probe Software	U.S. Gold	Unreleased	Unreleased	November 1993	
Gunstar Heroes	Treasure	Sega	September 10, 1993	September 1993	September 1993	
Gynoug Wings of Wor^{NA}	NCS	Masaya^{JP} DreamWorks^{NA} Sega^{PAL}	January 25, 1991	June 1991	March 1992	
Gyuwambler Jiko Chūshinha: Katayama Masayuki no Mahjong Dōjō	Yellow Horn	Game Arts	December 14, 1990	Unreleased	Unreleased	
Hard Drivin'	Sterling Silver Software	Tengen	December 21, 1990	1990	1991	
HardBall!	Accolade	Ballistic	Unreleased	June 1991	June 1991	
HardBall III	MindSpan	Accolade	Unreleased	March 1993	May 1993	
Hardball '94	MindSpan	Accolade	Unreleased	June 1994	July 15, 1994	
Hardball '95	Cygnus Multimedia Productions	Accolade	Unreleased	June 1995	Unreleased	
Haunting Starring Polterguy	Electronic Arts	Electronic Arts	Unreleased	October 1993	November 1993	
Heavy Nova	Micronet	Micronet	Unreleased	December 1991	Unreleased	
Heavy Unit: Mega Drive Special	Funari	Toho	December 26, 1990	Unreleased	Unreleased	
Hellfire	NCS	Masaya^{JP} Seismic Software^{NA} Sega^{PAL}	September 28, 1990	November 1990	1991	
Herzog Zwei	Technosoft	Technosoft^{JP} Sega^{WW}	December 15, 1989	March 1990	1990	
High Seas Havoc Captain Lang^{JP} Havoc^{PAL}	Data East	Data East^{NA/JP} Codemasters^{PAL}	April 22, 1994	January 1994	September 16, 1994	
Hit the Ice	Aisystem Tokyo	Taito	Unreleased	1992	Unreleased	
Home Alone	Brian A. Rice, Inc.	Sega	Unreleased	December 1992	December 8, 1992	
Home Alone 2: Lost in New York	Sega Interactive Development Division	Sega	Unreleased	December 1993	Unreleased	
Honō no Tōkyūji: Dodge Danpei	Sega	Sega	July 10, 1992	Unreleased	Unreleased	
Hook	Core Design	Sony Imagesoft	Unreleased	1993	November 19, 1993	
The Humans	Imagitec Design	GameTek	Unreleased	1992	Unreleased	
Hurricanes	Arc Developments	U.S. Gold	Unreleased	1995	October 1994	
The Hybrid Front	Sega; Oniro; H.I.C.	Sega	July 22, 1994	Unreleased	Unreleased	
Hyokkori Hyōtanjima: Daitōryō o Mezase!	Japan System House	Sega	August 7, 1992	Unreleased	Unreleased	
IMG International Tour Tennis	High Score Productions	EA Sports	Unreleased	October 1994	September 23, 1994	
The Immortal	Electronic Arts	Electronic Arts^{WW} Electronic Arts Victor^{JP}	August 10, 1993	November 1991	April 1992	
The Incredible Crash Dummies	Gray Matter	Flying Edge	Unreleased	January 1994	January 1994	
The Incredible Hulk	Probe Software	U.S. Gold	Unreleased	July 1994	July 22, 1994	
Indiana Jones and the Last Crusade	Tiertex	U.S. Gold	Unreleased	November 1992	December 1992	
Insector X	Hot-B	Hot-B^{JP} Sage's Creation^{NA}	September 7, 1990	October 1990	Unreleased	
Instruments of Chaos starring Young Indiana Jones	Brian A. Rice, Inc.	Sega	Unreleased	1994	Unreleased	
International Rugby	Tiertex	Domark	Unreleased	1995	October 1993	
International Sensible Soccer	Sensible Software	Sony Electronic Publishing	Unreleased	Unreleased	July 15, 1994	
International Superstar Soccer Deluxe	Factor 5	Konami	Unreleased	Unreleased	December 5, 1996	
Iron Hammer	NovaLogic	Sega	Unreleased	July 1996	Unreleased	
Izzy's Quest for the Olympic Rings	Alexandria	U.S. Gold	Unreleased	November 1995	November 6, 1995	
J.League Pro Striker	Sega	Sega	June 18, 1993	Unreleased	Unreleased	
J.League Pro Striker 2	Sega	Sega	July 15, 1994	Unreleased	Unreleased	
J.League Pro Striker Kanzenban	Sega	Sega	December 17, 1993	Unreleased	Unreleased	
Jack Nicklaus' Power Challenge Golf	Microsmiths	Accolade	Unreleased	July 1993	July 1993	
James "Buster" Douglas Knock Out Boxing Final Blow^{JP}	Taito	Taito^{JP} Sega^{WW}	March 23, 1990	1990	1991	
James Bond 007: The Duel	The Kremlin	Domark^{WW} Tengen^{JP}	May 14, 1993	March 1993	December 1992	
James Pond: Underwater Agent	Vectordean	Electronic Arts	Unreleased	April 1991	1991	
James Pond II: Codename: RoboCod	Vectordean	Electronic Arts^{WW} Electronic Arts Victor^{JP}	June 9, 1993	December 1991	December 1991	
James Pond 3: Operation Starfish	Vectordean	Electronic Arts	Unreleased	December 1993	November 1993	
Jammit	GTE ImagiTrek Studios	Virgin Interactive Entertainment	Unreleased	May 1994	Unreleased	
Janō Tōryūmon	Sega	Sega	November 5, 1993	Unreleased	Unreleased	
Jantei Monogatari	Atlus; Telenet Japan	Renovation Game	March 29, 1991	Unreleased	Unreleased	
Jennifer Capriati Tennis GrandSlam: The Tennis Tournament '92^{JP} GrandSlam: The Tennis Tournament^{PAL}	System Sacom	Telenet Japan^{JP} Renovation Products^{NA} Sega^{PAL}	June 12, 1992	September 1992	1992	
Jeopardy!	Park Place Productions	GameTek	Unreleased	1992	Unreleased	
Jeopardy! Deluxe Edition	Park Place Productions	GameTek	Unreleased	1993	Unreleased	
Jeopardy! Sports Edition	Park Place Productions	GameTek	Unreleased	May 1994	Unreleased	
Jerry Glanville's Pigskin Footbrawl	Developer Resources	RazorSoft	Unreleased	December 18, 1992	Unreleased	
Jewel Master	Sega	Sega	August 30, 1991	1991	November 21, 1991	
Jimmy White's 'Whirlwind' Snooker	Archer Maclean	Virgin Interactive Entertainment	Unreleased	Unreleased	November 1994	
Joe & Mac	Eden Entertainment Software	Takara	Unreleased	January 1994	Unreleased	
Joe Montana Football	Park Place Productions	Sega	March 1, 1991	January 1991	May 1991	
Joe Montana II: Sports Talk Football	BlueSky Software	Sega	January 24, 1992	November 1991	January 1992	
John Madden Football John Madden American Football^{PAL}	Park Place Productions	Electronic Arts	Unreleased	November 1990	December 1990	
John Madden Football '92 Pro Football^{JP}	Park Place Productions	Electronic Arts Sports Network^{WW} Electronic Arts Victor^{JP}	November 20, 1992	December 1991	1991	
John Madden Football '93	Looking Glass Technology	Electronic Arts Sports Network	Unreleased	December 1992	December 17, 1992	
John Madden Football '93: Championship Edition	Looking Glass Technology	EA Sports	Unreleased	1992	Unreleased	
Jordan vs. Bird	Electronic Arts	Electronic Arts Sports Network^{WW} Electronic Arts Victor^{JP}	September 24, 1993	1992	April 1992	
Judge Dredd	Probe Software	Acclaim Entertainment	September 1, 1995	June 16, 1995	June 16, 1995	
Junction	Micronet	Micronet	November 25, 1990	April 1991	Unreleased	
The Jungle Book	Eurocom	Virgin Interactive Entertainment	Unreleased	August 1994	August 26, 1994	
Jungle Strike	High Score Productions; Granite Bay Software	Electronic Arts^{WW} Electronic Arts Victor^{JP}	December 17, 1993	August 1993	July 16, 1993	
Jurassic Park	BlueSky Software	Sega	August 27, 1993	August 10, 1993	September 10, 1993	
Jurassic Park: Rampage Edition	BlueSky Software	Sega	Unreleased	October 1994	November 1994	
Justice League Task Force	Condor	Acclaim Entertainment	September 1, 1995	1995	June 1995	
Ka-Ge-Ki: Fists of Steel	Hot-B	Hot-B^{JP} Sage's Creation^{NA}	April 26, 1991	June 1991	Unreleased	
Kawasaki Superbike Challenge Kawasaki Superbikes^{PAL}	Lankhor	Time Warner Interactive	Unreleased	March 1995	March 17, 1995	
Kick Off 3: European Challenge	Anco Software	Vic Tokai	Unreleased	Unreleased	November 1994	
Kid Chameleon	Sega Technical Institute	Sega	May 29, 1992	March 1992	May 1992	
Kidō Keisatsu Patlabor: 98-Shiki Kidō Seyo!	Ma-Ba	Ma-Ba	October 23, 1992	Unreleased	Unreleased	
King of the Monsters	SPS	Takara^{NA} Sega^{PAL/JP}	November 26, 1993	1993	June 1993	
King of the Monsters 2	Betop	Takara	Unreleased	1994	Unreleased	
King Salmon	Hot-B	Vic Tokai^{NA} Hot-B^{JP}	September 26, 1992	July 1992	Unreleased	
King's Bounty: The Conqueror's Quest	New World Computing	Electronic Arts	Unreleased	July 1991	July 1991	
Kishi Densetsu	Geo Factory; Warlock	Kodansha	July 30, 1993	Unreleased	Unreleased	
Klax	Namco	Namco	September 7, 1990	Unreleased	Unreleased	
Klax	Tengen	Tengen	Unreleased	1990	November 1991	
Klondike	Skyworks Studios	Skyworks Technologies	Unreleased	1996	Unreleased	
Krusty's Super Fun House	Audiogenic	Flying Edge	Unreleased	1992	December 17, 1992	
Kyūkai Dōchūki	Namco	Namco	July 12, 1991	Unreleased	Unreleased	
La Russa Baseball 95	Stormfront Studios; High Score Productions	EA Sports	Unreleased	1994	Unreleased	
Lakers versus Celtics and the NBA Playoffs	Electronic Arts	Electronic Arts	Unreleased	December 1990	1991	
Landstalker: The Treasures of King Nole	Climax Entertainment	Sega	October 30, 1992	October 1993	November 1993	
Langrisser II	Team Career	Masaya	August 26, 1994	Unreleased	Unreleased	
Last Action Hero	Bits Studios	Sony Imagesoft	Unreleased	January 26, 1994	Unreleased	
Last Battle Hokuto no Ken: Shinseikimatsu Kyūseishu Densetsu^{JP}	Sega	Sega	July 1, 1989	August 1989	1990	
The Lawnmower Man	Atod	Time Warner Interactive	Unreleased	1994	November 1994	
Lemmings	Sunsoft	Sunsoft^{NA/JP} Sega^{PAL}	November 20, 1992	July 1992	December 10, 1992	
Lemmings 2: The Tribes	Digital Developments	Psygnosis	Unreleased	1994	November 1994	
Lethal Enforcers	Konami	Konami	December 10, 1993	1993	February 1994	
Lethal Enforcers II: Gun Fighters	Konami	Konami	Unreleased	October 1994	December 1994	
LHX Attack Chopper	Electronic Arts	Electronic Arts^{WW} Electronic Arts Victor^{JP}	June 4, 1993	October 1992	1992	
Liberty or Death	Koei	Koei	Unreleased	1994	Unreleased	
Light Crusader	Treasure	Sega	May 26, 1995	1995	September 22, 1995	
The Lion King	Westwood Studios	Virgin Interactive Entertainment	December 9, 1994	November 9, 1994 (Note: Reported in-stores date varies; sources either suggest October 31 or November 1. The in-stores date is different from the reported "street" or release date, November 9.)	November 4, 1994	
Lord Monarch	Sega Falcom	Sega	June 24, 1994	Unreleased	Unreleased	
The Lost Vikings	Silicon & Synapse	Interplay Productions^{NA} Virgin Interactive Entertainment^{PAL}	Unreleased	January 1994	May 19, 1994	
The Lost World: Jurassic Park	Appaloosa Interactive	Sega	Unreleased	September 16, 1997	1997	
Lotus Turbo Challenge	Gremlin Graphics	Electronic Arts	Unreleased	December 1992	December 17, 1992	
Lotus II: R.E.C.S.	Gremlin Graphics	Electronic Arts	Unreleased	December 1993	December 1993	
M-1 Abrams Battle Tank	Realtime Games Software	Sega	Unreleased	1991	1991	
Madden NFL '94 NFL Pro Football '94^{JP}	High Score Productions	EA Sports^{WW} Electronic Arts Victor^{JP}	February 18, 1994	November 19, 1993	November 1993	
Madden NFL '95	High Score Productions	EA Sports	Unreleased	November 18, 1994	November 1994	
Madden NFL '96	High Score Productions	EA Sports	Unreleased	November 10, 1995	1995	
Madden NFL 97	High Score Productions	EA Sports	Unreleased	October 1996	1996	
Madden NFL 98	Tiertex	THQ	Unreleased	1997	Unreleased	
Madō Monogatari I	Compile	Compile	March 22, 1996	Unreleased	Unreleased	
Magical Taruruto-kun	Game Freak	Sega	April 24, 1992	Unreleased	Unreleased	
The Magic School Bus: Space Exploration Game	Novotrade	Sega	Unreleased	1995	Unreleased	
Mahjong Cop Ryū: Shiro Ookami no Yabō	Whiteboard	Sega	December 14, 1989	Unreleased	Unreleased	
Mamono Hunter Yōko: Dai 7 no Keishō	Klon	Masaya	March 22, 1991	Unreleased	Unreleased	
Man Overboard!	Zeppelin Games	Codemasters	Unreleased	Unreleased	November 1994	
Marble Madness	Electronic Arts	Electronic Arts	Unreleased	1991	March 1992	
Marble Madness	Tengen	Tengen	August 13, 1993	Unreleased	Unreleased	
Mario Andretti Racing	Stormfront Studios; High Score Productions	EA Sports	Unreleased	1994	1994	
Mario Lemieux Hockey	Alpine Software	Sega	Unreleased	1991	March 1992	
Marko's Magic Football Marko^{NA}	The Cartoon Mavericks	Domark	Unreleased	October 1994	July 21, 1994	
Marsupilami	Apache Software	Sega	Unreleased	May 1996	October 27, 1995	
Marvel Land Talmit's Adventure^{PAL}	Namco	Namco^{JP/NA} Sega^{PAL}	June 28, 1991	1991	August 1992	
Mary Shelley's Frankenstein	Bits Studios	Sony Imagesoft	Unreleased	November 4, 1994	Unreleased	
Master of Monsters	ISCO; Opera House	Toshiba EMI^{JP} Renovation Products^{NA}	July 26, 1991	December 1991	Unreleased	
Master of Weapon	KID	Taito	September 27, 1991	Unreleased	Unreleased	
Maten no Sōmetsu	Warlock; Geo Factory	Kodansha	December 29, 1993	Unreleased	Unreleased	
Math Blaster: Episode 1	Spidersoft; Western Technologies	Davidson & Associates	Unreleased	1994	Unreleased	
Mazin Saga: Mutant Fighter Mazin Wars^{PAL}	Almanic Corporation; ALU; Team "Saga"	Sega^{JP/PAL} Vic Tokai^{NA}	February 26, 1993	October 1993	July 1993	
McDonald's Treasure Land Adventure	Treasure	Sega	September 23, 1993	December 1993	March 1994	
Mega Bomberman	Westone	Sega	Unreleased	February 1995	November 23, 1994	
Mega-Lo-Mania Tyrants: Fight Through Time^{NA}	Sensible Software	Virgin Games^{WW} CRI^{JP}	April 23, 1993	1993	March 1993	
Mega Man: The Wily Wars	Minakuchi Engineering	Capcom	October 21, 1994	December 1994 (Note: This game was exclusively released via the Sega Channel online game service.)	April 1995	
Megapanel	Namco	Namco	November 22, 1990	Unreleased	Unreleased	
Mega SWIV	Sales Curve Interactive	Time Warner Interactive	Unreleased	Unreleased	February 17, 1995	
Mega Turrican	Factor 5	Data East^{NA} Sony Electronic Publishing^{PAL}	Unreleased	March 1994	November 1994	
Menacer 6-Game Cartridge	Western Technologies; Johnson-Voorsanger Productions	Sega	Unreleased	October 1992	November 19, 1992	
Mercs Senjō no Ōkami II^{JP}	Sega	Sega	September 27, 1991	October 1991	December 1991	
Metal Fangs	Sega; Genki	Victor Entertainment	December 17, 1993	Unreleased	Unreleased	
Michael Jackson's Moonwalker	Sega	Sega	August 25, 1990	September 1990	January 1991	
Mickey Mania: The Timeless Adventures of Mickey Mouse	Traveller's Tales	Sony Imagesoft^{WW} Sega^{JP}	March 31, 1995	November 1, 1994	October 28, 1994	
Mickey's Ultimate Challenge	Designer Software	Hi Tech Expressions	Unreleased	1994	Unreleased	
Micro Machines	Codemasters	Codemasters	Unreleased	September 1993	July 1993	
Micro Machines 2: Turbo Tournament	Supersonic Software	Codemasters	Unreleased	Unreleased	November 25, 1994	
Micro Machines: Turbo Tournament '96	Supersonic Software	Codemasters	Unreleased	Unreleased	October 20, 1995	
Micro Machines Military	Supersonic Software	Codemasters	Unreleased	Unreleased	November 11, 1996	
Midnight Resistance	Data East; ISCO; Opera House	Data East^{JP} Sega^{NA}	March 29, 1991	June 1991	Unreleased	
MiG-29: Fighter Pilot	PanelComp; The Kremlin	Domark^{WW} Tengen^{JP}	November 26, 1993	August 1993	July 1993	
Might and Magic II: Gates to Another World	New World Computing	Electronic Arts	Unreleased	July 1991	July 1991	
Mighty Morphin Power Rangers	Nova	Sega	Unreleased	1994	December 1994	
Mighty Morphin Power Rangers: The Movie	SIMS	Sega	Unreleased	1995	December 1995	
Mike Ditka Power Football	Accolade	Ballistic	Unreleased	December 1991	October 23, 1991	
Minnesota Fats: Pool Legend	Data East	Data East	Unreleased	May 1995	Unreleased	
The Miracle Piano Teaching System	The Software Toolworks	The Software Toolworks	Unreleased	1992	Unreleased	
MLBPA Baseball	High Score Productions	EA Sports	Unreleased	1994	Unreleased	
Monopoly	Sculptured Software	Parker Brothers	Unreleased	1992	Unreleased	
Monster World IV	Westone	Sega	April 1, 1994	Unreleased	Unreleased	
Mortal Kombat	Probe Software	Arena Entertainment^{WW} Acclaim Entertainment^{JP}	May 27, 1994	September 13, 1993	September 13, 1993	
Mortal Kombat II	Probe Software	Acclaim Entertainment	September 9, 1994	September 9, 1994	September 9, 1994	
Mortal Kombat 3	Sculptured Software	Williams Entertainment^{NA} Acclaim Entertainment^{PAL}	Unreleased	October 13, 1995	October 20, 1995	
Mr. Nutz	Ocean Software	Ocean Software	Unreleased	1995	November 1994	
Ms. Pac-Man	Tengen	Tengen^{NA} Time Warner Interactive^{PAL}	Unreleased	July 1991	1995	
Muhammad Ali Heavyweight Boxing	Park Place Productions	Virgin Games	Unreleased	1992	July 1993	
MUSHA Musha Aleste^{JP}	Compile	Toaplan^{JP} Seismic Software^{NA}	December 21, 1990	February 1991	Unreleased	
Mutant Chronicles: Doom Troopers	Adrenalin Entertainment	Playmates Interactive Entertainment	Unreleased	November 1995	Unreleased	
Mutant League Football	Mutant Productions	Electronic Arts^{WW} Electronic Arts Victor^{JP}	September 10, 1993	May 1993	July 1993	
Mutant League Hockey	Abalone; Mutant Productions	Electronic Arts	Unreleased	May 1994	March 1994	
Mystical Fighter Maō Renjishi^{JP}	KID	Taito^{JP} DreamWorks^{NA}	October 25, 1991	March 1992	Unreleased	
Mystic Defender Kujaku Ō 2: Gen'eijō^{JP}	Sega	Sega	November 25, 1989	December 1989	1990	
Nakajima Satoru Kanshū F1 Grand Prix	Varie	Varie	December 20, 1991	Unreleased	Unreleased	
Nakajima Satoru Kanshū F1 Super License	Aprinet; Varie	Varie	December 11, 1992	Unreleased	Unreleased	
NBA Action '94	Malibu Interactive	Sega	Unreleased	April 1994	Unreleased	
NBA Action '95 Starring David Robinson	Double Diamond Sports	Sega	Unreleased	1995	April 21, 1995	
NBA All-Star Challenge	Beam Software	Flying Edge	Unreleased	1992	1993	
NBA Hangtime	Funcom	Midway^{NA} THQ^{PAL}	Unreleased	November 5, 1996	February 21, 1997	
NBA Jam	Iguana Entertainment	Arena Entertainment^{WW} Acclaim Entertainment^{JP}	April 29, 1994	March 4, 1994	March 4, 1994	
NBA Jam Tournament Edition	Iguana Entertainment	Acclaim Entertainment	February 24, 1995	February 23, 1995	February 23, 1995	
NBA Live 95	Hitmen Productions	EA Sports	Unreleased	1994	October 28, 1994	
NBA Live 96	Hitmen Productions	EA Sports	Unreleased	1995	November 8, 1995	
NBA Live 97	NuFX; Hitmen Productions	EA Sports	Unreleased	November 1996	1996	
NBA Live 98	Tiertex	THQ	Unreleased	December 2, 1997	Unreleased	
NBA Showdown '94 NBA Showdown^{PAL}	EA Creative Development	EA Sports^{WW} Electronic Arts Victor^{JP}	July 1, 1994	1994	March 29, 1994	
NCAA Final Four Basketball	Bitmasters	Mindscape	Unreleased	1995 (Note: Advertised as available for Genesis in 1995 issues of gaming magazines; packaging bears a 1994 copyright.)	Unreleased	
NCAA Football	The Software Toolworks	Mindscape	Unreleased	1994	Unreleased	
Nekketsu Kōkō Dojjibōru Bu: Mega Doraibu Sakkā-hen	Aspect	Palsoft	August 7, 1992	Unreleased	Unreleased	
New 3D Golf Simulation: Devil's Course	T&E Soft	Sega	January 28, 1994	Unreleased	Unreleased	
New 3D Golf Simulation: Harukanaru Augusta	T&E Soft	T&E Soft	December 17, 1993	Unreleased	Unreleased	
New 3D Golf Simulation: Waialae no Kiseki	T&E Soft	Sega	February 25, 1994	Unreleased	Unreleased	
Newman/Haas IndyCar featuring Nigel Mansell	Gremlin Graphics	Acclaim Entertainment	December 16, 1994	December 1994	December 2, 1994	
The NewZealand Story	Taito	Taito	March 3, 1990	Unreleased	Unreleased	
NFL '95	Double Diamond Sports; FarSight Technologies	Sega	Unreleased	November 15, 1994	Unreleased	
NFL '98	Spectacular Games; FarSight Technologies	Sega	Unreleased	1997	Unreleased	
NFL Football '94 Starring Joe Montana	BlueSky Software	Sega	February 4, 1994	November 1993	Unreleased	
NFL Quarterback Club	Iguana Entertainment	Acclaim Entertainment	February 24, 1995	1994	February 24, 1995	
NFL Quarterback Club 96	Iguana Entertainment	Acclaim Entertainment	Unreleased	October 27, 1995	1995	
NFL Sports Talk Football '93 Starring Joe Montana	BlueSky Software	Sega	Unreleased	1992	November 19, 1992	
NHK Taiga Drama: Taiheiki	Tose	Sega	December 13, 1991	Unreleased	Unreleased	
NHL '94	High Score Productions	EA Sports	Unreleased	September 1993	October 1993	
NHL 95	High Score Productions; Double Diamond Sports	EA Sports	Unreleased	September 1994	September 23, 1994	
NHL 96	High Score Entertainment	EA Sports	Unreleased	October 6, 1995	October 1995	
NHL 97	High Score Entertainment	EA Sports	Unreleased	October 1996	1996	
NHL 98	Electronic Arts	THQ	Unreleased	1997	Unreleased	
NHL All-Star Hockey '95	Sega Midwest Studio; New Wave Graphics	Sega	Unreleased	February 1995	Unreleased	
NHL Hockey EA Hockey^{PAL} Professional Hockey^{JP}	Park Place Productions	Electronic Arts^{WW} Electronic Arts Victor^{JP}	November 20, 1992	August 1991	August 1991	
NHLPA Hockey '93	EA Studios	Electronic Arts Sports Network	Unreleased	September 1992	October 21, 1992	
Nigel Mansell's World Championship Racing	Gremlin Graphics	GameTek^{NA} Konami^{PAL}	Unreleased	November 1993	1994	
Nightmare Circus	Funcom	Sega^{NA/PAL} Tec Toy^{BR}	Unreleased	April 1996 (Note: This game was exclusively released via the Sega Channel online game service.)	May 1997 (Note: This game was exclusively released via the Sega Channel online game service.)	1996^{BR}
Ninja Burai Densetsu	Sega	Sega	December 5, 1991	Unreleased	Unreleased	
No Escape	Bits Studios	Psygnosis	Unreleased	1994	Unreleased	
Nobunaga no Yabō: Bushō Fūunroku	Koei	Koei	December 20, 1991	Unreleased	Unreleased	
Nobunaga no Yabō: Haōden	Koei	Koei	February 25, 1994	Unreleased	Unreleased	
Nobunaga's Ambition Nobunaga no Yabō: Zenkokuban^{JP}	Koei	Koei	September 15, 1993	1993	Unreleased	
Normy's Beach Babe-O-Rama	Realtime Associates	Electronic Arts	Unreleased	1994	March 1994	
Olympic Gold	Tiertex	U.S. Gold^{WW} Sega^{JP}	July 24, 1992	June 1992	June 1992	
Olympic Summer Games	Tiertex	Black Pearl Software	Unreleased	July 1996	June 28, 1996	
The Ooze	Sega Technical Institute	Sega	September 22, 1995	September 1995	February 2, 1996	
Operation Europe: Path to Victory Europa Sensen^{JP}	Koei	Koei	January 16, 1993	1994	Unreleased	
Osomatsu-kun: Hachamecha Gekijō	Sega	Sega	December 24, 1988	Unreleased	Unreleased	
The Ottifants	Graftgold	Sega	Unreleased	Unreleased	December 1993	
Outback Joey	Western Technologies	HeartBeat	Unreleased	1993	Unreleased	
Outlander	Mindscape	Mindscape	Unreleased	March 1993	Unreleased	
Out Run	Hertz	Sega	August 9, 1991	1991	1991	
OutRun 2019	Hertz	Sega^{WW} SIMS^{JP}	March 26, 1993	March 1993	April 1993	
OutRunners	Sega	Sega^{JP} Data East^{NA}	May 13, 1994	July 1994	Unreleased	
P.T.O.: Pacific Theater of Operations Teitoku no Ketsudan^{JP}	Koei	Koei	September 24, 1992	1993	Unreleased	
Pac-Attack Pac-Panic^{PAL}	Namco	Namco	Unreleased	1994 (Note: Advertised as available for Genesis in 1994 issues of gaming magazines; packaging bears a 1993 copyright.)	December 1995	
Pac-Man 2: The New Adventures	Namco	Namco	Unreleased	November 1994	Unreleased	
Pac-Mania	Sculptured Software	Tengen	Unreleased	September 1991	1991	
Pachinko Kūnyan	I.S.C.	Soft Vision	December 18, 1992	Unreleased	Unreleased	
The Pagemaster	Probe Software; Atod	Fox Interactive	Unreleased	November 23, 1994	December 1994	
Panorama Cotton	Success	Sunsoft	August 12, 1994	Unreleased	Unreleased	
Paperboy	Motivetime	Tengen	June 26, 1992	February 1992	1992	
Paperboy 2	Tengen	Tengen	Unreleased	March 1993	May 1993	
Party Quiz Mega Q	Sega	Sega	November 5, 1993	Unreleased	Unreleased	
Pat Riley Basketball Super Real Basketball^{JP/PAL}	Sega	Sega	March 2, 1990	August 1990	1990	
Pebble Beach Golf Links New 3D Golf Simulation: Peburubīchi no hatō^{JP}	T&E Soft	Sega	October 29, 1993	1994	September 23, 1994	
Pelé!	Radical Entertainment	Accolade	Unreleased	December 1993	January 1994	
Pelé II: World Tournament Soccer Pelé's World Tournament Soccer^{PAL}	Radical Entertainment	Accolade	Unreleased	June 1994	November 4, 1994	
Pepenga Pengo	JSH	Sega	December 22, 1995	Unreleased	Unreleased	
Pete Sampras Tennis	Zeppelin Games	Codemasters	Unreleased	1994	June 16, 1994	
PGA European Tour	Polygames	EA Sports	Unreleased	1994	March 1994	
PGA Tour 96	NuFX; Hitmen Productions	EA Sports	Unreleased	November 1995	December 1995	
PGA Tour Golf	Sterling Silver Software	Electronic Arts	Unreleased	April 1991	May 1991	
PGA Tour Golf II	Polygames	EA Sports^{WW} Electronic Arts Victor^{JP}	April 16, 1993	January 1993	February 19, 1993	
PGA Tour Golf III	Polygames; High Score Productions	EA Sports	Unreleased	December 1994	November 25, 1994	
Phantasy Star Fukkokuban	Sega	Sega	April 2, 1994	Unreleased	Unreleased	
Phantasy Star II	Sega	Sega	March 21, 1989	March 1990	1990	
Phantasy Star III: Generations of Doom	Sega	Sega	April 21, 1990	June 1991	October 1991	
Phantasy Star IV: The End of the Millennium	Sega	Sega	December 17, 1993	February 1995	November 1995	
Phantom 2040	Viacom New Media	Viacom New Media	Unreleased	June 1995	October 1995	
Phelios	Namco	Namco^{JP/NA} Sega^{PAL}	July 20, 1990	October 1990	December 1991	
Pink Goes to Hollywood	HeadGames	TecMagik	Unreleased	November 1993	April 21, 1994	
Pinocchio	Virgin Studios London	THQ^{NA} Sega^{PAL}	Unreleased	October 1996	October 1996	
The Pirates of Dark Water	Iguana Entertainment	Sunsoft	Unreleased	May 1994	March 10, 1995	
Pirates! Gold	MicroProse	MicroProse	Unreleased	1993	Unreleased	
Pit-Fighter	Sterling Silver Software	Tengen	March 27, 1992	November 1991	April 1992	
Pitfall: The Mayan Adventure	Activision	Activision	June 1995 (Note: This game was exclusively released via the Sega Channel online game service.)	November 1994	December 1994	
Pocahontas	Funcom	Disney Interactive^{NA} Sega^{PAL}	Unreleased	March 1996	September 12, 1996	
Populous	Bullfrog Productions	Electronic Arts^{WW} Sega^{JP}	August 9, 1991	June 1990	November 1990	
Powerball Wrestleball^{JP}	Namco	Namco	February 8, 1991	April 1991	Unreleased	
Power Drive	Rage Software	U.S. Gold	Unreleased	1994	December 1994	
Powermonger	Sprytes	Electronic Arts^{WW} Electronic Arts Victor^{JP}	June 18, 1993	1992	March 1993	
Predator 2	Perfect 10 Productions	Arena Entertainment	Unreleased	1992	October 29, 1992	
Premier Manager	Gremlin Interactive	Sega	Unreleased	Unreleased	November 24, 1995	
Premier Manager 97	Gremlin Interactive	Sega	Unreleased	Unreleased	October 31, 1996	
Primal Rage	Probe Entertainment	Time Warner Interactive	Unreleased	August 25, 1995	August 25, 1995	
Prime Time NFL	Spectacular Games	Sega	Unreleased	November 1995	Unreleased	
Prince of Persia	Domark	Tengen^{NA} Domark^{PAL}	Unreleased	February 1994	March 1994	
Pro Moves Soccer	BGS Developments; ZAT Productions	ASCII Entertainment	Unreleased	November 1993	Unreleased	
Pro Quarterback	Leland Interactive Media	Tradewest	Unreleased	1992	Unreleased	
Pro Striker Final Stage	Sega	Sega	August 4, 1995	Unreleased	Unreleased	
Psy-O-Blade	Graphic Research	Sigma Enterprises	April 27, 1990	Unreleased	Unreleased	
Psycho Pinball	Codemasters	Codemasters	Unreleased	Unreleased	November 25, 1994	
Puggsy	Traveller's Tales	Psygnosis	Unreleased	January 6, 1994	November 19, 1993	
Pulseman	Game Freak	Sega	July 22, 1994	1995	Unreleased	
The Punisher	Sculptured Software	Capcom	Unreleased	February 1995	April 1995	
Puyo Puyo 2	Compile	Compile	December 2, 1994	Unreleased	Unreleased	
Puzzle & Action: Ichidant-R	Sega	Sega	January 13, 1995	Unreleased	Unreleased	
Puzzle & Action: Tant-R	Sega	Sega	April 1, 1994	Unreleased	Unreleased	
QuackShot Starring Donald Duck	Sega	Sega	December 20, 1991	November 1991	December 1991	
Quad Challenge MegaTrax^{JP}	Now Production	Namco	August 6, 1991	1991	Unreleased	
R.B.I. Baseball '93	Tengen	Tengen	Unreleased	June 1993	Unreleased	
R.B.I. Baseball '94	Tengen	Tengen	Unreleased	April 1994	June 16, 1994	
R.B.I. Baseball 3	Tengen	Tengen	Unreleased	October 1991	Unreleased	
R.B.I. Baseball 4	Tengen	Tengen	December 18, 1992	September 1992	Unreleased	
Race Drivin'	Polygames	Tengen	Unreleased	November 1993	Unreleased	
Radical Rex	Beam Software	Activision	Unreleased	1994	November 1994	
Raiden Trad	Micronet	Micronet	July 6, 1991	September 1991	Unreleased	
Rainbow Islands Extra	Aisystem Tokyo	Taito	October 5, 1990	Unreleased	Unreleased	
Rambo III	Sega	Sega	October 21, 1989	November 1989	1990	
Rampart	Silicon Sorcery	Tengen	December 11, 1992	1992	Unreleased	
Ranger X Ex-Ranza^{JP}	GAU Entertainment	Sega	May 28, 1993	October 1993	August 1993	
Ransei no Hasha	SPS	Asmik	November 29, 1991	Unreleased	Unreleased	
Rastan Saga II	Opera House	Taito	August 10, 1990	1991	Unreleased	
Red Zone	Zyrinx	Time Warner Interactive	Unreleased	November 1994	November 1994	
The Ren & Stimpy Show Presents: Stimpy's Invention	BlueSky Software	Sega	Unreleased	December 1993	March 1994	
Rent a Hero	Sega AM2	Sega	September 20, 1991	Unreleased	Unreleased	
The Revenge of Shinobi The Super Shinobi^{JP}	Sega	Sega	December 2, 1989	December 1989	October 1990	
Revolution X	Rage Software	Acclaim Entertainment	Unreleased	December 1995	1995	
Richard Scarry's Busytown	Novotrade	Sega	Unreleased	1994	Unreleased	
Rings of Power	Naughty Dog	Electronic Arts	Unreleased	January 1992	February 1992	
Rise of the Robots	Data Design Interactive	Acclaim Entertainment	Unreleased	Unreleased	February 1995	
Risk	Sculptured Software	Parker Brothers	Unreleased	1994	Unreleased	
Risky Woods	Electronic Arts	Electronic Arts^{WW} Electronic Arts Victor^{JP}	February 19, 1993	1992	December 17, 1992	
Ristar	Sega	Sega	February 17, 1995	February 1995	February 17, 1995	
RoadBlasters	Sterling Silver Software	Tengen	February 28, 1992	November 1991	Unreleased	
Road Rash	Electronic Arts	Electronic Arts^{WW} Electronic Arts Victor^{JP}	November 20, 1992	September 1991	September 1991	
Road Rash II	Electronic Arts	Electronic Arts^{WW} Electronic Arts Victor^{JP}	July 23, 1993	December 1992	December 1992	
Road Rash 3	Monkey Do Productions	Electronic Arts	Unreleased	March 1995	March 11, 1995	
RoboCop 3	Eden Entertainment Software	Flying Edge	Unreleased	November 1993	November 1993	
RoboCop Versus The Terminator	Virgin Games	Virgin Interactive Entertainment	May 28, 1994	December 12, 1993	December 1993	
Rocket Knight Adventures	Konami	Konami	August 6, 1993	August 1993	September 1993	
Rock n' Roll Racing	Blizzard Entertainment	Interplay Productions	Unreleased	November 1994	December 2, 1994	
Roger Clemens' MVP Baseball	Sculptured Software	Flying Edge	Unreleased	1992	Unreleased	
Rolling Thunder 2	Namco	Namco^{JP/NA} Sega^{PAL}	November 19, 1991	January 1992	April 1993	
Rolling Thunder 3	Now Production	Namco	Unreleased	July 1993	Unreleased	
Rolo to the Rescue	Vectordean	Electronic Arts^{WW} Electronic Arts Victor^{JP}	April 29, 1993	February 1993	January 1993	
Romance of the Three Kingdoms II	Koei	Koei	December 26, 1991	1992	Unreleased	
Romance of the Three Kingdoms III: Dragon of Destiny	Koei	Koei	November 8, 1992	1993	Unreleased	
Rugby World Cup '95	Electronic Arts	EA Sports	Unreleased	December 1994	December 1994	
Sagaia Darius II^{JP}	Taito	Taito	December 20, 1990	1991	Unreleased	
Saint Sword	Cyclone System	Taito	June 28, 1991	October 1991	Unreleased	
Sampras Tennis 96	Codemasters	Codemasters	Unreleased	Unreleased	July 28, 1995	
Samurai Shodown	Saurus; System Vision	Sega^{JP/PAL} Takara^{NA}	November 19, 1994	November 1994	February 1995	
Sangokushi Retsuden: Ransei no Eiyūtachi	Sega	Sega	April 29, 1991	Unreleased	Unreleased	
Saturday Night Slam Masters	Capcom	Capcom	Unreleased	1994	1994	
Scooby-Doo Mystery	The Illusions Gaming Company	Acclaim Entertainment	Unreleased	September 1995	Unreleased	
SeaQuest DSV	Sculptured Software	Black Pearl Software^{NA} THQ^{PAL}	Unreleased	February 1995	June 30, 1995	
Second Samurai	Vivid Image	Sony Electronic Publishing	Unreleased	Unreleased	November 1994	
Sensible Soccer	Sensible Software	Sony Imagesoft	Unreleased	Unreleased	December 10, 1993	
Sesame Street Counting Cafe	Riedel Software Productions	Electronic Arts	Unreleased	1994	Unreleased	
Shadow Blasters Shiten-Myooh^{JP}	Sigma Pro-Tech	Sigma Enterprises^{JP} Sage's Creation^{NA}	August 10, 1990	1990	Unreleased	
Shadow Dancer: The Secret of Shinobi	Sega	Sega	December 1, 1990	1990	1991	
Shadow of the Beast	WJS Design	Electronic Arts^{WW} Victor Musical Industries^{JP}	March 27, 1992	November 1991	December 1991	
Shadow of the Beast II	WJS Design	Electronic Arts	Unreleased	1992	1992	
Shadowrun	BlueSky Software	Sega	Unreleased	1994	Unreleased	
Shanghai II: Dragon's Eye	Brian A. Rice, Inc.	Activision	Unreleased	March 1994	Unreleased	
Shaq Fu	Delphine Software International	Electronic Arts	Unreleased	October 28, 1994	October 28, 1994	
Shi-Kin-Joh	Sunsoft	Sunsoft	April 27, 1991	Unreleased	Unreleased	
Shining Force	Climax Entertainment; Sonic! Software Planning	Sega	March 20, 1992	May 1993	July 1993	
Shining Force II	Sonic! Software Planning	Sega	October 1, 1993	1994	September 1994	
Shining in the Darkness	Climax Entertainment	Sega	March 29, 1991	October 1991	November 11, 1991	
Shinobi III: Return of the Ninja Master The Super Shinobi II^{JP}	Sega	Sega	July 23, 1993	September 1993	September 1993	
Shōgi no Hoshi	Home Data	Home Data	October 31, 1991	Unreleased	Unreleased	
Shove It! The Warehouse Game Shijō Saidai no Sōkoban^{JP}	NCS	Masaya^{JP} DreamWorks^{NA}	January 30, 1990	April 1990	Unreleased	
Show do Milhão	Tectoy	Tectoy	Unreleased	Unreleased	Unreleased	2001^{BR}
Show do Milhão Volume 2	Tectoy	Tectoy	Unreleased	Unreleased	Unreleased	2002^{BR}
Shura no Mon	SIMS	Sega	August 7, 1992	Unreleased	Unreleased	
Side Pocket	Data East	Data East^{NA/JP} Sega^{PAL}	December 11, 1992	August 1992	1992	
The Simpsons: Bart's Nightmare	Sculptured Software	Flying Edge	Unreleased	August 1993	October 1993	
The Simpsons: Bart vs. the Space Mutants	Arc Developments	Flying Edge	Unreleased	1992	1992	
Skeleton Krew	Core Design	Core Design	Unreleased	May 1995	June 9, 1995	
Skitchin'	EA Canada	Electronic Arts	Unreleased	April 1994	March 26, 1994	
Slap Fight MD	M.N.M Software	Tengen	June 11, 1993	Unreleased	Unreleased	
Slaughter Sport Fatman^{JP}	Mediagenic	Sanritsu^{JP} RazorSoft^{NA}	October 12, 1990	December 20, 1991	Unreleased	
The Smurfs	Infogrames	Infogrames	Unreleased	Unreleased	January 27, 1995	
The Smurfs Travel the World	Virtual Studio	Infogrames	Unreleased	Unreleased	1996	
Snake Rattle 'n' Roll	Rare	Sega	Unreleased	Unreleased	October 1993	
Snow Bros.	Toaplan	Tengen	May 28, 1993	Unreleased	Unreleased	
Socket Time Dominator 1st^{JP}	Vic Tokai	Vic Tokai	March 25, 1994	1993	Unreleased	
Sol-Deace	Wolf Team	Renovation Products	Unreleased	March 1992	Unreleased	
Sonic 3D Blast Sonic 3D: Flickies' Island^{PAL}	Traveller's Tales; Sonic Team	Sega	Unreleased	November 7, 1996	November 14, 1996	
Sonic & Knuckles	Sega Technical Institute	Sega	October 18, 1994	October 18, 1994	October 18, 1994	
Sonic the Hedgehog	Sonic Team	Sega	July 26, 1991	June 1991	June 1991	
Sonic the Hedgehog 2	Sega Technical Institute	Sega	November 21, 1992	November 24, 1992	November 24, 1992	
Sonic the Hedgehog 3	Sega Technical Institute	Sega	May 27, 1994	February 2, 1994	February 24, 1994	
Sonic the Hedgehog Spinball	Sega Technical Institute	Sega	December 10, 1993	November 23, 1993	November 23, 1993	
Sorcerer's Kingdom	Technical Wave	Masaya^{JP} Treco^{NA}	February 7, 1992	May 1993	Unreleased	
Sorcerian	Sega	Sega	February 24, 1990	Unreleased	Unreleased	
Space Harrier II	Sega	Sega	October 29, 1988	August 1989	September 1990	
Space Invaders 90 Space Invaders '91^{NA}	Taito	Taito	September 7, 1990	1991	Unreleased	
Sparkster: Rocket Knight Adventures 2	Konami	Konami	September 23, 1994	October 1994	November 1994	
Speedball 2: Brutal Deluxe	The Bitmap Brothers	Arena Entertainment^{NA} CRI^{JP} Virgin Games^{PAL}	June 19, 1992	December 1991	October 29, 1992	
Spider-Man	Western Technologies	Acclaim Entertainment	Unreleased	1995	March 10, 1995	
Spider-Man vs. The Kingpin	Technopop; Recreational Brainware	Sega	October 18, 1991	August 1991	1991	
Spider-Man and Venom: Maximum Carnage	Software Creations	Acclaim Entertainment	May 26, 1995	September 16, 1994	September 16, 1994	
Spider-Man and the X-Men in Arcade's Revenge	Software Creations	Flying Edge	Unreleased	1993	October 1993	
Spirou	Infogrames	Infogrames	Unreleased	Unreleased	1995	
Splatterhouse 2	Now Production	Namco	August 4, 1992	July 1992	October 7, 1992	
Splatterhouse 3	Now Production	Namco	March 19, 1993	August 1993	Unreleased	
Sports Talk Baseball Pro Yakyū Super League '91^{JP}	Sega	Sega	August 30, 1991	1992	Unreleased	
Spot Goes to Hollywood	Eurocom	Virgin Interactive Entertainment^{PAL} Acclaim Entertainment^{NA}	Unreleased	1995	November 1995	
Star Cruiser	Arsys Software	Masaya	December 21, 1990	Unreleased	Unreleased	
Star Trek: Deep Space Nine – Crossroads of Time	Novotrade	Playmates Interactive Entertainment^{NA} Virgin Interactive Entertainment^{PAL}	Unreleased	1995	May 15, 1996	
Star Trek: The Next Generation: Echoes from the Past	Spectrum HoloByte	Sega	Unreleased	1994	Unreleased	
Starflight	BlueSky Software	Electronic Arts	Unreleased	October 7, 1991	October 9, 1991	
Stargate	Probe Software	Acclaim Entertainment	Unreleased	March 1995	March 24, 1995	
Steel Empire Empire of Steel^{PAL}	Hot-B	Hot-B^{JP} Flying Edge^{WW}	March 13, 1992	1992	November 12, 1992	
Steel Talons	Polygames	Tengen	June 25, 1993	1992	February 1993	
Stormlord	Punk Development	RazorSoft^{NA} Micro World^{JP}	March 27, 1992	1991 (Note: Advertised as available for Genesis in 1991 issues of gaming magazines; packaging bears a 1990 copyright.)	Unreleased	
Street Fighter II': Special Champion Edition Street Fighter II′ Plus^{JP}	Capcom	Capcom	September 28, 1993	September 1993	October 29, 1993	
Street Racer	Vivid Image	Ubi Soft	Unreleased	Unreleased	June 29, 1995	
Street Smart	SNK	Treco	July 19, 1991	June 1991	Unreleased	
Streets of Rage Bare Knuckle: Ikari no Tetsuken^{JP}	Sega	Sega	August 2, 1991	1991	September 1991	
Streets of Rage 2 Bare Knuckle II: Shitō heno Chingonka^{JP}	Ancient; Shout! Design Works; M.N.M Software; H.I.C.	Sega	January 14, 1993	1992	January 22, 1993	
Streets of Rage 3 Bare Knuckle III^{JP}	Sega	Sega	March 18, 1994	1994	July 22, 1994	
Strider	Sega	Sega	September 29, 1990	December 1990	1990	
Strider II Journey from Darkness: Strider Returns^{NA}	Tiertex	U.S. Gold	Unreleased	1993 (Note: Advertised as available for Genesis in 1993 issues of gaming magazines; packaging bears a 1992 copyright.)	March 1993	
Striker	Rage Software	Sega	Unreleased	Unreleased	1995	
Sub-Terrania	Zyrinx	Sega	Unreleased	April 1994	May 1994	
Summer Challenge	MindSpan	Accolade	Unreleased	1993	May 1993	
Sunset Riders	Konami	Konami	Unreleased	December 1992	April 1993	
Super Baseball 2020	NuFX	Electronic Arts^{WW} Electronic Arts Victor^{JP}	March 4, 1994	September 1993	September 1993	
Super Battleship	Synergistic Software	Mindscape	Unreleased	January 1994	Unreleased	
Super Battletank: War in the Gulf	Absolute Entertainment	Absolute Entertainment	Unreleased	1992	Unreleased	
Super Daisenryaku	Sega	Sega	April 29, 1989	Unreleased	Unreleased	
Super Fantasy Zone	Sunsoft	Sunsoft^{JP} Sega^{PAL}	January 14, 1992	Unreleased	1993	
Super Hang-On	Sega	Sega	October 6, 1989	November 1989	November 1990	
Super High Impact	Iguana Entertainment	Arena Entertainment	Unreleased	1992	Unreleased	
Super Hydlide	T&E Soft	Asmik^{JP} Seismic Software^{NA} Sega^{PAL}	October 6, 1989	March 1990	1991	
Super Kick Off	Tiertex	U.S. Gold	Unreleased	Unreleased	May 1993	
Superman Superman: The Man of Steel^{PAL}	Thinking Rabbit	Sunsoft^{NA} Virgin Games^{PAL}	Unreleased	December 1992	June 1993	
Super Monaco GP	Sega	Sega	August 9, 1990	September 1990	January 1991	
Super Off Road	Software Creations	Ballistic	Unreleased	1992	April 15, 1992	
Super Skidmarks	Acid Software	Codemasters	Unreleased	Unreleased	November 1995	
Super Smash TV	Probe Software	Flying Edge	Unreleased	August 1992	November 19, 1992	
Super Street Fighter II	Capcom	Capcom	June 25, 1994	July 7, 1994	August 19, 1994	
Super Thunder Blade	Sega	Sega	October 29, 1988	August 1989	September 1990	
Super Volleyball	Micronics	Video System	February 1, 1991	1991	Unreleased	
Surging Aura	Japan Media Programming	Sega	March 17, 1995	Unreleased	Unreleased	
Sword of Sodan	Innerprise Software	Electronic Arts^{WW} Sega^{JP}	October 11, 1991	1990	1990	
Sword of Vermilion Vermilion^{JP}	Sega AM2	Sega	December 16, 1989	November 10, 1990	1990	
Syd of Valis SD Valis^{JP}	I.S.C.	Laser Soft^{JP} Renovation Products^{NA}	February 14, 1992	1992	Unreleased	
Sylvester and Tweety in Cagey Capers	Alexandria	Time Warner Interactive	Unreleased	September 1994	November 1994	
Syndicate	Bullfrog Productions	Electronic Arts	Unreleased	1994	January 1995	
T2: The Arcade Game	Probe Software	Arena Entertainment^{WW} Acclaim Entertainment^{JP}	February 25, 1994	November 1992	December 17, 1992	
Taikō Risshiden	Koei	Koei	May 28, 1993	Unreleased	Unreleased	
TaleSpin	Interactive Designs	Sega	Unreleased	November 1992	1992	
Target Earth Assault Suit Leynos^{JP}	NCS	Masaya^{JP} DreamWorks^{NA}	March 16, 1990	May 1990	Unreleased	
Task Force Harrier EX	Jorudan	Treco	December 20, 1991	May 1992	Unreleased	
Taz in Escape from Mars	HeadGames	Sega	Unreleased	August 1994	September 23, 1994	
Taz-Mania	Recreational Brainware	Sega	December 25, 1992	July 1992	July 1992	
Team USA Basketball Dream Team USA^{JP}	Electronic Arts	Electronic Arts Sports Network^{WW} Electronic Arts Victor^{JP}	December 26, 1992	August 1992	October 7, 1992	
Technoclash	Zono; BlueSky Software	Electronic Arts	Unreleased	August 1993	August 1993	
Techno Cop	Punk Development	RazorSoft	Unreleased	1990	Unreleased	
Tecmo Super Baseball	Sculptured Software	Tecmo	Unreleased	October 15, 1994	Unreleased	
Tecmo Super Bowl	Tecmo	Tecmo	November 26, 1993	November 1993	Unreleased	
Tecmo Super Bowl II: Special Edition	Tecmo	Tecmo	December 20, 1994	January 1995	Unreleased	
Tecmo Super Bowl III: Final Edition	Tecmo	Tecmo	Unreleased	October 1995	Unreleased	
Tecmo Super Hockey	Malibu Interactive	Tecmo	Unreleased	February 1995	Unreleased	
Tecmo Super NBA Basketball	Sculptured Software	Tecmo	March 4, 1994	December 1993	Unreleased	
Tecmo World Cup Tecmo World Cup '92^{JP}	Hertz	SIMS^{JP} Atlus^{NA}	January 31, 1992	1992	Unreleased	
Teenage Mutant Ninja Turtles: The Hyperstone Heist Teenage Mutant Hero Turtles: The Hyperstone Heist^{PAL} Teenage Mutant Ninja Turtles: Return of the Shredder^{JP}	Konami	Konami	December 22, 1992	December 1992	April 1993	
Teenage Mutant Ninja Turtles: Tournament Fighters Teenage Mutant Hero Turtles: Tournament Fighters^{PAL}	Konami	Konami	December 3, 1993	December 1993	January 1994	
Tel-Tel Mahjong	Sunsoft	Sunsoft	June 8, 1990	Unreleased	Unreleased	
Tel-Tel Stadium	Sunsoft	Sunsoft	October 21, 1990	Unreleased	Unreleased	
The Terminator	Probe Software	Virgin Games	Unreleased	May 1992	August 1992	
Terminator 2: Judgment Day	Bits Studios	Flying Edge	Unreleased	December 1993	1993	
Theme Park	Bullfrog Productions	Electronic Arts	Unreleased	1995	May 21, 1995	
Thomas the Tank Engine & Friends	Malibu Interactive	THQ	Unreleased	1993	Unreleased	
Thunder Force II	Technosoft	Technosoft^{JP} Sega^{WW}	June 15, 1989	August 1989	November 1990	
Thunder Force III	Technosoft	Technosoft	June 8, 1990	October 1990	Unreleased	
Thunder Force IV Lightening Force: Quest for the Darkstar^{NA}	Technosoft	Technosoft^{JP} Sega^{WW}	July 24, 1992	January 1993	December 10, 1992	
Thunder Fox	Aisystem Tokyo	Taito	June 26, 1991	1991	Unreleased	
Thunder Pro Wrestling Retsuden	Human Entertainment	Human Entertainment	March 27, 1992	Unreleased	Unreleased	
The Tick	Software Creations	Fox Interactive	Unreleased	November 1994	Unreleased	
Time Killers	Incredible Technologies	Black Pearl Software	Unreleased	1996	1996	
Tinhead	MicroProse	Ballistic	Unreleased	1993	Unreleased	
Tintin in Tibet	Infogrames	Infogrames	Unreleased	Unreleased	1996	
Tiny Toon Adventures: ACME All-Stars	Konami	Konami	Unreleased	October 1994	November 1994	
Tiny Toon Adventures: Buster's Hidden Treasure	Konami	Konami	Unreleased	March 1993	May 1993	
TNN Bass Tournament of Champions	Imagitec Design	American Softworks	Unreleased	1994	Unreleased	
TNN Outdoors Bass Tournament '96	Imagitec Design	American Softworks	Unreleased	1996	Unreleased	
Todd's Adventures in Slime World Slime World^{JP}	Epyx	Micro World^{JP} Renovation Products^{NA}	April 30, 1992	June 1992	Unreleased	
ToeJam & Earl	Johnson-Voorsanger Productions	Sega	March 13, 1992	October 1991	November 18, 1991	
ToeJam & Earl in Panic on Funkotron	Johnson-Voorsanger Productions	Sega	Unreleased	December 1993	January 21, 1994	
Tōgi Ō: King Colossus	Sega	Sega	June 26, 1992	Unreleased	Unreleased	
Toki: Going Ape Spit JuJu Densetsu^{JP}	Santos	Sega	January 31, 1992	1992	April 1992	
Tom and Jerry: Frantic Antics!	Beam Software	Hi Tech Expressions^{NA} Altron^{JP}	December 16, 1994	December 1993	Unreleased	
Tommy Lasorda Baseball Super League^{JP/PAL}	Sega	Sega	April 22, 1989	August 1989	1990	
Tony La Russa Baseball	Stormfront Studios	EA Sports	Unreleased	March 1993	Unreleased	
Top Gear 2	Gremlin Graphics	Vic Tokai	Unreleased	1994	Unreleased	
Top Pro Golf	Soft Vision	Soft Vision	June 19, 1992	Unreleased	Unreleased	
Total Football	Domark	Domark	Unreleased	Unreleased	October 20, 1995	
Toughman Contest	Visual Concepts; High Score Productions	EA Sports	Unreleased	March 1995	March 1995	
Toxic Crusaders	Infogrames	Sega	Unreleased	1992	Unreleased	
Toy Story	Traveller's Tales	Disney Interactive^{NA} Sega^{PAL} Tec Toy^{BR}	Unreleased	November 21, 1995	March 29, 1996	October 1996^{BR}
Toys	Imagineering	Absolute Entertainment	Unreleased	June 1993	Unreleased	
Trampoline Terror!	NCS	DreamWorks	Unreleased	1990	Unreleased	
Traysia Minato no Traysia^{JP}	Riot	Riot^{JP} Renovation Products^{NA}	February 14, 1992	April 1992	Unreleased	
Triple Play 96	Extended Play Productions	EA Sports	Unreleased	June 1995	Unreleased	
Triple Play: Gold Edition	Extended Play Productions	EA Sports	Unreleased	October 1996	Unreleased	
Trouble Shooter Battle Mania^{JP}	Vic Tokai	Vic Tokai	March 6, 1992	November 1991	Unreleased	
Troy Aikman NFL Football	Leland Interactive Media	Tradewest	Unreleased	October 1994	Unreleased	
True Lies	Beam Software	Acclaim Entertainment	April 28, 1995	1995	March 24, 1995	
Truxton	Toaplan	Sega	December 9, 1989	December 1989	November 1990	
Turbo OutRun	Tiertex	Sega	March 27, 1992	Unreleased	1992	
Turrican	The Code Monkeys	Accolade	Unreleased	July 1991	October 15, 1991	
Twin Cobra: Desert Attack Helicopter Kyūkyoku Tiger^{JP}	Graphic Research	Treco^{JP} Sega^{NA}	February 22, 1991	June 1991	Unreleased	
Twin Hawk	Toaplan	Sega	June 23, 1990	Unreleased	1990	
Twinkle Tale	Zap Corporation	Wonder Amusement Studio	July 24, 1992	Unreleased	Unreleased	
Two Crude Dudes Crude Buster^{JP}	ISCO; Opera House	Data East^{JP/NA} Sega^{PAL}	February 28, 1992	March 1992	1992	
Two Tribes: Populous II	PanelComp	Virgin Games	Unreleased	Unreleased	September 1993	
Uchū Senkan Gomora	Aisystem Tokyo	UPL	September 30, 1991	Unreleased	Unreleased	
Ultimate Mortal Kombat 3	Avalanche Software	Williams Entertainment^{NA} Tec Toy^{BR} Acclaim Entertainment^{PAL}	Unreleased	October 11, 1996	December 1996	October 1996^{BR}
Ultimate Qix Volfied^{JP}	I.T.L	Taito	January 25, 1991	1991	Unreleased	
Ultimate Soccer	Rage Software	Sega	Unreleased	Unreleased	October 8, 1993	
Ultraman	Human Entertainment	Ma-Ba	April 9, 1993	Unreleased	Unreleased	
Uncharted Waters	Koei	Koei	April 29, 1992	1992 (Note: Advertised as available for Genesis in 1992 issues of gaming magazines; packaging bears a 1991 copyright.)	Unreleased	
Uncharted Waters: New Horizons	Koei	Koei	June 24, 1994	1994	Unreleased	
Undeadline	T&E Soft	Palsoft	December 20, 1991	Unreleased	Unreleased	
Unnecessary Roughness '95	Accolade	Accolade	Unreleased	November 1994	Unreleased	
Urban Strike	Granite Bay Software; Foley Hi-Tech	Electronic Arts	Unreleased	1994	September 30, 1994	
Uzu Keobukseon	Samsung	Samsung	Unreleased	Unreleased	Unreleased	May 5, 1993^{KR}
Valis Mugen Senshi Valis^{JP}	Riot	Riot^{JP} Renovation Products^{NA}	December 27, 1991	1991	Unreleased	
Valis III	Telenet Japan	Renovation Game^{JP} Renovation Products^{NA}	March 22, 1991	June 1991	Unreleased	
Vapor Trail Kuuga: Operation Code "Vapor Trail"^{JP}	Data East	Riot^{JP} Renovation Products^{NA}	August 2, 1991	October 1991	Unreleased	
Vectorman	BlueSky Software	Sega	Unreleased	October 24, 1995	November 1995	
Vectorman 2	BlueSky Software	Sega	Unreleased	November 7, 1996	Unreleased	
Venom/Spider-Man: Separation Anxiety	Software Creations	Acclaim Entertainment	Unreleased	November 1995	1995	
Verytex	Opera House; ISCO	Asmik	April 5, 1991	Unreleased	Unreleased	
Viewpoint	Nexus Interact	Sammy	Unreleased	November 1994	Unreleased	
Virtua Fighter 2	Gaibrain; Success; Data East	Sega	Unreleased	November 21, 1996	November 28, 1996	
Virtua Racing	Sega AM2	Sega	March 18, 1994	June 1994	May 27, 1994	
Virtual Bart	Sculptured Software	Acclaim Entertainment	December 31, 1995	September 23, 1994	1994	
Virtual Pinball	Bill Budge	Electronic Arts	Unreleased	November 1993	December 1993	
Vixen 357	NCS	Masaya	October 23, 1992	Unreleased	Unreleased	
VR Troopers	Syrox Developments	Sega	Unreleased	1995	December 8, 1995	
Wacky Worlds Creativity Studio	HeadGames	Sega	Unreleased	1994	Unreleased	
Wani Wani World	Inter State	Kaneko	January 31, 1992	Unreleased	Unreleased	
Wardner	Visco	Visco^{JP} Mentrix Software^{NA}	April 26, 1991	May 1991	Unreleased	
Warlock	Realtime Associates	Acclaim Entertainment	Unreleased	April 13, 1995	March 10, 1995	
Warrior of Rome Ambition of Caesar^{JP}	Micronet	Micronet	February 24, 1991	May 1991	Unreleased	
Warrior of Rome II Ambition of Caesar II^{JP}	Micronet	Micronet	May 28, 1992	May 1992	Unreleased	
Warsong Langrisser^{JP}	Team Career	Masaya^{JP} Treco^{NA}	April 26, 1991	March 1992	Unreleased	
Waterworld	Data Design Interactive	Ocean Software	Unreleased	March 1996	Unreleased	
Wayne Gretzky and the NHLPA All-Stars	Time Warner Interactive	Time Warner Interactive	Unreleased	April 1995	1995	
Wayne's World	Gray Matter	THQ	Unreleased	1993	Unreleased	
WeaponLord	Visual Concepts	Namco	Unreleased	September 1995	Unreleased	
Wheel of Fortune	Imagitec Design	GameTek	Unreleased	May 1992	Unreleased	
Where in the World Is Carmen Sandiego?	EA Canada	Electronic Arts	Unreleased	September 1992	November 5, 1992	
Where in Time is Carmen Sandiego?	EA Canada	Electronic Arts	Unreleased	April 1992	April 1992	
Whip Rush	Vic Tokai	Sega^{JP} Renovation Products^{NA}	May 26, 1990	October 1990	Unreleased	
Williams Arcade's Greatest Hits Midway Presents Arcade's Greatest Hits^{PAL}	Digital Eclipse	Williams Entertainment^{NA} THQ^{PAL}	Unreleased	1996	February 14, 1997	
Wimbledon Championship Tennis Wimbledon^{PAL}	SIMS	Sega	May 20, 1994	October 1993	September 1993	
Winter Challenge	MindSpan	Ballistic	Unreleased	1992	February 12, 1992	
Winter Olympics Winter Olympic Games^{NA}	Tiertex	U.S. Gold^{WW} Sega^{JP}	February 11, 1994	December 1993	1993	
Wiz 'n' Liz	Raising Hell Productions	Psygnosis	Unreleased	January 6, 1994	November 26, 1993	
Wolfchild	Core Design	JVC Musical Industries	Unreleased	March 1993	Unreleased	
Wolverine: Adamantium Rage	Teeny Weeny Games	Acclaim Entertainment	Unreleased	November 1994	December 1994	
Wonder Boy III: Monster Lair	Sega	Sega	December 22, 1990	Unreleased	1991	
Wonder Boy in Monster World Wonder Boy V: Monster World III^{JP} Turma da Mônica na Terra Dos Monstros^{BR}	Westone	Sega^{WW} Tec Toy^{BR}	October 25, 1991	February 1992	April 1992	1994^{BR}
World Championship Soccer World Cup Soccer^{JP} World Cup Italia '90^{PAL}	Sega	Sega	July 29, 1989	September 1989	1990	
World Championship Soccer 2	Sensible Software	Sega	Unreleased	1994	1994	
World Class Leaderboard Golf	Tiertex	U.S. Gold	Unreleased	1992	December 1992	
World Cup USA '94	Tiertex	U.S. Gold	Unreleased	1994	June 3, 1994	
World Heroes	Sega Midwest Studio	Sega	Unreleased	1994	Unreleased	
World of Illusion Starring Mickey Mouse and Donald Duck	Sega	Sega	December 18, 1992	March 1993	December 1992	
World Series Baseball	BlueSky Software	Sega	Unreleased	April 1994	Unreleased	
World Series Baseball '95	BlueSky Software	Sega	Unreleased	April 1995	Unreleased	
World Series Baseball '96	BlueSky Software	Sega	Unreleased	August 1996	Unreleased	
World Series Baseball '98	BlueSky Software	Sega	Unreleased	July 22, 1997	Unreleased	
Worms	East Point Software	Ocean Software	Unreleased	Unreleased	July 25, 1996	
Wrestle War	Sega	Sega	June 28, 1991	Unreleased	November 18, 1991	
WWF Raw	Sculptured Software	Acclaim Entertainment	December 31, 1995	November 1994	1994	
WWF Royal Rumble	Sculptured Software	Flying Edge^{WW} Acclaim Entertainment^{JP}	March 25, 1994	November 1993	November 1993	
WWF Super WrestleMania	Sculptured Software	Flying Edge	Unreleased	November 1992	November 26, 1992	
WWF WrestleMania: The Arcade Game	Sculptured Software	Acclaim Entertainment	Unreleased	November 1995	1995	
X-Men	Western Technologies	Sega	Unreleased	March 15, 1993	June 1993	
X-Men 2: Clone Wars	HeadGames	Sega	Unreleased	1995	April 1995	
X-Perts	Abalone	Sega	Unreleased	1996	Unreleased	
XDR	Affect	UNIPACC	August 26, 1990	Unreleased	Unreleased	
Xenon 2: Megablast	The Bitmap Brothers	Virgin Games	Unreleased	Unreleased	November 12, 1992	
Yogi Bear: Cartoon Capers	Blue Turtle	GameTek	Unreleased	Unreleased	1994	
Ys III: Wanderers from Ys	Riot	Riot^{JP} Renovation Products^{NA}	November 1, 1991	1991	Unreleased	
Yū Yū Hakusho Gaiden	GAU Entertainment	Sega	January 28, 1994	Unreleased	Unreleased	
Yū Yū Hakusho Makyō Tōitsusen Yu Yu Hakusho: Sunset Fighters^{BR}	Treasure	Sega^{JP} Tec Toy^{BR}	September 30, 1994	Unreleased	Unreleased	1999^{BR}
Zan: Yasha Enbukyoku	Wolf Team	Wolf Team	March 29, 1991	Unreleased	Unreleased	
Zany Golf	Sandcastle Productions	Electronic Arts	Unreleased	August 1990	December 1990	
Zero the Kamikaze Squirrel	Iguana Entertainment	Sunsoft	Unreleased	October 1994	July 1995	
Zero Tolerance	Technopop	Accolade	Unreleased	October 5, 1994	September 1994	
Zero Wing	Toaplan	Toaplan^{JP} Sega^{PAL}	May 31, 1991	Unreleased	May 1992	
Zombies Ate My Neighbors Zombies^{PAL}	LucasArts	Konami	Unreleased	November 1993	January 21, 1994	
Zool	Gremlin Graphics	Electronic Arts^{PAL} GameTek^{NA}	Unreleased	January 1994	December 1993	
Zoom!	Sigma Pro-Tech	Sega	January 13, 1990	January 1990	1990	
Zoop	PanelComp	Viacom New Media	Unreleased	October 9, 1995	November 28, 1995	

== Compilations ==
Title	Developer	Publisher	Year
10 Super Jogos (BRAZIL) / Mega Games 10 (ASIA)	Sega	Tec Toy	1997
6-Pak	Sega	Sega	1995
Arcade Classics	Sega	Sega	1995
The Disney Collection : Castle of Illusion Starring Mickey Mouse / QuackShot Starring Donald Duck (PAL)	Sega	Sega	1996
EA Sports Double Header	Park Place Productions	Electronic Arts	1993
Mega Games I (PAL)	Sega	Sega	1992
Mega Games 2	Sega	Sega	1995
Mega Games 3	Sega	Sega	1995
Mega Games 6	Sega	Sega	1995
Mega Games 6 vol. 2	Sega	Sega	1995
Mega 6 Vol. 3	Sega	Sega	1995
Sega Sports 1 (Europe)	Sega	Sega	1995
Sonic Compilation (PAL) / Sonic Classics (NA)	Sega	Sega	1995
Triple Score: 3 Games in 1 (NA)	Sega	Sega	1993

== Unlicensed games ==
Title(s)	Developer(s)	Publisher(s)	Release date			
Title(s)	Developer(s)	Publisher(s)	JP	NA	PAL	Other
Action 52	FarSight Technologies	Active Enterprises	Unreleased	May 1993	Unreleased	
Arkagis Revolution	Sik	Mega Cat Studios^{NA} Broke Studio	August 29, 2020	August 29, 2020	August 29, 2020	
Barver Battle Saga: Tài Kong Zhàn Shì Brave Battle Saga: The Space Soldier	Chuanpu Technology	Chuanpu Technology	Unreleased	Unreleased	Unreleased	TW (1996)
Beggar Prince Xin Qigai Wangzi ^{TW}	C&E, Inc.	C&E, Inc.^{TW} Super Fighter Team^{NA}	Unreleased	May 22, 2006	Unreleased	TW (1996)
Bible Adventures	Wisdom Tree	Wisdom Tree	Unreleased	1994	Unreleased	
Blow 'em Out	Retroscribe	Second Dimension	Unreleased	January 31, 2021	Unreleased	
Canon: Legend of the New Gods Feng Shen Ying Jie Chuan^{TW}	Chuanpu Technology	Chuanpu Technology	Unreleased	April 19, 2015	Unreleased	TW (1996)
Cascade	Epyx	Super Fighter Team	Unreleased	December 24, 2015	Unreleased	
Crazy Bus	Tom Scripts Ltda	Tom Scripts Ltda	Unreleased	Unreleased	Unreleased	VE (2004)
Darius Extra Version	M2	Strictly Limited Games^{World} Columbus Circle^{JP}	February 25, 2021	December 2021	December 2021	
Debtor	PSCD Games	PSCD Games	Unreleased	June 19, 2020	Unreleased	
Divine Sealing	Studio Fazzy	CYX	1991	Unreleased	Unreleased	
Demons Of Asteborg	Neofid Technology	Neofid Technology	Unreleased	Unreleased	August 2021	
Dracula no Shiro	Habit Soft	Game Impact	December 25, 2021	Unreleased	Unreleased	
Earth Defense The Earth Defend^{TW}	AV Artisan	Realtec	Unreleased	1995	Unreleased	TW (1995)
Exodus	Wisdom Tree	Wisdom Tree	Unreleased	1993	Unreleased	
Farming Simulator 16 Bit Edition	GIANTS Software	GIANTS Software	November 12, 2024	November 12, 2024	November 12, 2024	
Funny World & Balloon Boy	AV Artisan	Realtec	Unreleased	1993	Unreleased	TW (1993)
Ganso Kyuukyoku Girl 6-nin Adventure Mahjong! Dial Q wo Mawase!	Studio Fazzy	Studio Fazzy	1992	Unreleased	Unreleased	
Hercules 2	Chuanpu Technology	X Boy	Unreleased	Unreleased	Unreleased	TW (1999)
Huan Lè Táo Qì Shǔ: Smart Mouse	Chuanpu Technology	Chuanpu Technology	Unreleased	Unreleased	Unreleased	TW (1992)
Ishido: The Way of Stones	Accolade	Accolade	Unreleased	February 1991	Unreleased	
Joshua & the Battle of Jericho	Wisdom Tree	Wisdom Tree	Unreleased	1994	Unreleased	
Legend of Wukong Wucom Legend^{TW}	Gamtec	Ming Technology^{TW} Super Fighter Team^{NA}	Unreleased	December 3, 2008	Unreleased	TW (1996)
Link Dragon	Songtly	Jumbo Team	Unreleased	Unreleased	Unreleased	TW (1993)
The Lion King II	Gamtec	X Boy	Unreleased	Unreleased	Unreleased	TW (1995 or 1996)
Mad Stalker: Full Metal Forth	Opera House	Strictly Limited Games^{World} Columbus Circle^{JP}	September 17, 2020	February 2022	February 2022	
Magic Girl Featuring Ling Ling the Little Witch Magic Girl^{TW}	Gamtec	Gamtec^{TW} Super Fighter Team^{NA}	Unreleased	December 24, 2015	Unreleased	TW (1992)
Mega 3D Noah's Ark	Wisdom Tree	Piko Interactive	Unreleased	May 1, 2018	Unreleased	
Miniplanets	Sik	PlayOnRetro	Unreleased	Unreleased	August 29, 2020	
Onslaught	The Code Monkeys	Ballistic	Unreleased	July 1991	Unreleased	
Papi Commando	Studio Vetea	WaterMelon	September 9, 2016	September 9, 2016	September 9, 2016	
Paprium	WaterMelon	WaterMelon	December 16, 2020	December 16, 2020	December 16, 2020	
Pier Solar and the Great Architects	WaterMelon	WaterMelon	December 20, 2010	December 20, 2010	December 20, 2010	
Repair-chan no Shuuri Daisakusen	Habit Soft	Game Impact	October 16, 2021	Unreleased	Unreleased	
Shuǐ Hǔ Fēng Yún Zhuán	Never Ending Soft Team	Never Ending Soft Team	Unreleased	Unreleased	Unreleased	TW (1996)
Spiritual Warfare	Wisdom Tree	Wisdom Tree	Unreleased	1994	Unreleased	
Switchblade	Core Design	Piko Interactive	Unreleased	April 15, 2019	Unreleased	
Squirrel King	Gamtec	Gamtec	Unreleased	Unreleased	Unreleased	TW (1996)
Star Control	Toys For Bob	Accolade	Unreleased	June 1991	July 1991	
Taiwan Daheng	C&E, Inc.	C&E, Inc.	Unreleased	Unreleased	Unreleased	TW (1994)
Tanglewood	Big Evil Corporation	Big Evil Corporation	August 14, 2018	August 14, 2018	August 14, 2018	
Tänzer	Mikael Tillander	Mega Cat Studios	2019	2019	2019	
Thunderbolt II	Sun Green	Sun Green	Unreleased	Unreleased	Unreleased	TW (1993)
Tom Clown	AV Artisan	Realtec	Unreleased	1993	Unreleased	
Tūnshí Tiāndì III	SKOB	SKOB	Unreleased	Unreleased	Unreleased	TW (1995)
Under the Shrine of Death	kakoeimon	kakoeimon	May 8, 2023	May 8, 2023	May 8, 2023	
Ultracore	Digital Illusions CE AB	Strictly Limited Games	Unreleased	March 2019	March 2019	
Universal Soldier	The Code Monkeys	Ballistic	Unreleased	November 1992	1992	
WarpSpeed	Accolade	Accolade	Unreleased	July 1993	1993	
Water Margin: The Tales of Clouds and Winds	King Tec Information Co., Ltd.	Never Ending Soft Team	Unreleased	Unreleased	Unreleased	TW (1996)
Whac-a-Critter Mallet Legend^{TW}	AV Artisan	Realtec	Unreleased	1993	Unreleased	TW (1993)
Xeno Crisis	Bitmap Bureau	Bitmap Bureau	2018	2018	2018	
Yang Warrior Family	Taiwan Sankyo Information Co., Ltd.	Taiwan Sankyo Information Co., Ltd.	Unreleased	Unreleased	Unreleased	TW (1990)
Zhuo Guǐ Dà Shi: Ghost Hunter	Senchi Technology	Senchi Technology	Unreleased	Unreleased	Unreleased	TW (1994)

== See also ==
- List of cancelled Sega Genesis games
- List of Sega CD games
- List of 32X games
