= Bass Masters Classic: Pro Edition =

1996 video game

- North American Super NES cover art
- Developer: Black Pearl Software
- Publisher: THQ (Note: Released under the Black Pearl Software brand name)
- Designers: Todd Tomlinson; Dan Burke; Donn Nauert; Robert Bonifacio
- Platforms: Super NES, Sega Genesis
- Release: Super NES: NA: July 1996; EU: November 1996; Genesis: NA: November 1996
- Genre: Fishing
- Mode: Single-player

Bass Masters Classic: Pro Edition is an enhanced version of Bass Masters Classic, released for both the Super Nintendo Entertainment System and Sega Genesis. As a promotional tool, an introductory offer to join the Bass Anglers Sportsman Society for $14 (instead of the usual $20) was bundled with the game.

== Gameplay ==
The fish has identified the lure and is going for an "easy snack"; unaware of the fisher trying to catch him.

The game contains real companies in the fishing industry (i.e. Ranger Boats, Evinrude Outboard Motors, etc.) The game has two modes where the player fishes as an amateur and competes against other amateurs. The player also has the option of playing as famous bass anglers such as Tom Mann Jr. and Hank Parker.

Once the player has selected a mode they purchase various lures, rods, motors, depth sounders and other fishing implements. From here the player can practice skill in the practice pond or begin fishing in their first tournament. While there are a few different lakes that can be unlocked the gameplay remains the same. The player begins by driving their boat to a spot on the lake. There they cast and the screen switches from overhead view to an underwater camera.

The player then entices the fish into biting their lure and a fight ensues.

== Reception ==
Reception

Review scores
Publication	Score
Famitsu	22/40 (SNES)
GamePro	3.875/5 (SMD) (Note: GamePro scored Bass Masters Classic: Pro Edition two 3.5/5 scores for sound and fun factor, 4.5/5 for control, and 4/5 for graphics.)
Total!	75/100 (SNES)

On release, Famicom Tsūshin scored the Super Famicom version of the game a 22 out of 40.

Scary Larry of GamePro gave the Genesis version of the original Bass Masters Classic a negative review. Though he noted it has a larger selection of anglers than the SNES version does, he criticized the "murky" graphics and sound, and said of the gameplay that "real fishing is easier than this. The Fish Finder is inaccurate, the casting can be ridiculously off-course, and there are long boring stretches while you wait for bass to come around."

GamePro's Bro' Buzz gave the Super NES version a more positive review, saying it "won't win new fans to the sport, [but] hard-core video fisherpersons will be hooked." He particularly praised the fun fishing and new underwater view.
