= Bimini Run =

1991 video game

- Developer: Microsmiths
- Publisher: Nuvision Entertainment
- Platform: Sega Genesis
- Release: NA: February 1991
- Genre: Shooter
- Modes: Single-player, multiplayer

Bimini Run is a third-person shooter video game for the Sega Genesis. It was developed by Microsmiths and published by Nuvision Entertainment in 1991. Bimini Run allows two players to traverse a wide scrolling environment on objective based missions.

== Plot ==
The story begins with the kidnapping of Kim Ohara, the sister of an expert motorboat driver and secret agent Kenji. The kidnapping is immediately traced to Dr. Orca, who has hired other boat drivers and helicopter pilots to protect his island laboratory/fortress where he plans on unleashing a superweapon on the entire world. Kenji and his partner Luka arm themselves on a power boat and prepare to rescue Kim and save the world.

== Gameplay ==
The player controls the boat's steering by Kenji and shooting a rapid-fire bazooka by Luka. The gameplay consists of moving around the map (typically, an archipelago), completing objectives and shooting enemies who stand in the way. The player instantly loses a life if hit, so maneuvering to dodge enemy fire and other obstacles is a critical skill to learn. Typical objectives include reaching and destroying certain structures on the islands or following something around the map to their destination. New objectives are received in the form of radio messages notified of by a specific sound effect.

In the pause menu, the player can see the last radio message and the map of the area with current targets marked on it.

== Reception ==
Reception

Review scores
Publication	Score
Electronic Gaming Monthly	7/7/7/7
Raze	78%

Bimini Run received average reception from video game critics.
