= NCAA Final Four Basketball =

1995 video game

- Developer: Bitmasters
- Publisher: Mindscape
- Producer: Jim Molitor
- Designer: Bob Bayse
- Programmers: Franz Lanzinger; David O'Riva; Eric Ginner; Matthew Hamre; Jim Stevens
- Artist: Greg Hancock
- Composer: Jerry Gerber
- Platforms: Sega Genesis, SNES
- Release: March 1995
- Genres: Sports (basketball)
- Modes: Single-player, multiplayer

NCAA Final Four Basketball is a sports video game developed by Bitmasters and published by Mindscape for the Sega Genesis and SNES.

== Gameplay ==
NCAA Final Four Basketball is a game which makes use of the top 64 college basketball teams as well as their official team logos. The player can take control of all five players on the team. The game offers two different practice modes in addition to the main game.

== Development and release ==
NCAA Final Four Basketball was developed by Bitmasters for the SNES and Sega Genesis for publisher Mindscape. Some of the game's graphics were pre-rendered using Silicon Graphics workstations running Alias software. One of its programmers, Franz Lanzinger, was a former Atari employee who co-founded Bitmasters in 1990 and served as its president until 1995. The company was best known for producing the SNES port of Primal Rage. Another NCAA programmer, Eric Ginner, had learned to code on the SNES after quickly completing a version of the classic Atari title Pong. NCAA was released in North America in March 1995.

== Reception ==
Reception

Review scores
Publication	Score
GamePro	4.125/5 (SNES)
Next Generation	2/5 (SNES)
Nintendo Power	2.95/5 (SNES)
Super GamePower	3.8/5 (SNES)
VideoGames	4/10 (SNES)

Next Generation reviewed the SNES version of the game, rating it two stars out of five, and stated that "It's pretty looking, but dull."
