= MiG-29: Fighter Pilot =

1993 video game

- Developers: PanelComp; The Kremlin
- Publisher: Domark
- Platform: Sega Genesis
- Release: EU: July 1993; NA: August 1993
- Genre: Combat flight simulation
- Mode: Single-player

MiG-29: Fighter Pilot (alternatively titled MiG-29: Fulcrum) is a 1993 video game developed by PanelComp and The Kremlin and published by Domark for the Sega Genesis. The game is a combat flight simulation game for the Mikoyan MiG-29, and was marketed as the first flight simulator for the console. Upon release, the game received mixed reviews, with critics praising the game's depth and visual fidelity, and critiquing its controls, handling, and gameplay.

== Gameplay ==
Gameplay screenshot

In a fictional conflict against the state of Arzaria, the Commonwealth of Soviet States and NATO have allied to deploy Russian Mikoyan MiG-29 fighter jets to the Middle East. Players maneuver a jet by using the joypad, using the cockpit heads-up display. An instrument panel and map provides readings for the plane's altitude, thrust, radar, fuel gauge, and compass. The game features five missions following an initial training mission, with the objective of each mission to use missiles to target industrial and military targets, whilst avoiding civilians.

== Reception ==
Reception

Review scores
Publication	Score
AllGame	3/5
Electronic Gaming Monthly	6/10
GamesMaster	80%
Mean Machines Sega	75%
Sega Pro	82%

Despite praising the game's graphics and breadth of options and missions, Mean Machines Sega felt the "impressive features don't make up for the flaccid gameplay", faulting the "poor handling" of the plane, its "frustrating control method", and tedious gameplay. GamesMaster wrote that the game "looks nicely detailed", but could be "fiddly" to control, and required a joystick for players to "get the most out of it". Electronic Gaming Monthly considered the game's concept was a "good idea", but critiqued its "choppy" graphical performance.
