= Megapanel =

1990 video game

MegaPanel
- Developer: Namco
- Publisher: Namco
- Platform: Mega Drive
- Release: JP: November 22, 1990
- Genre: Puzzle
- Mode: Multiplayer

MegaPanel (メガパネル) is a 1990 puzzle video game developed and published by Namco for the Mega Drive in Japan.

== Gameplay ==
As coloured blocks slowly scroll onto the screen, the player must reconfigure them into sets of the same colour, at which time the blocks disappear and points are gained. There are some major differences that separates the game from being a Tetris clone. Instead of the blocks being made up of three or four squares arranged into various shapes, they are all the same shape, a simple square. Their only variable is the difference in colour. Like some jigsaw puzzle games, there is one empty square on the screen, at which the player can slide the blocks around one at a time in an attempt to arrange into three colour long strings (vertically or horizontally). The blocks appear as one complete row from the bottom of the screen, rather than the top. The player attempts to keep the blocks from reaching the top of the screen before the various required goals are achieved. If that does happen, the player loses a life and has to start the level again. If the player loses all three lives then the game is over.

There are three different gameplay modes: training, two-player, and pin up. In two-player mode, two separate block fields are displayed on the screen—one for each player. The objective to defeat the opponent two out of three times. One player can cause boxes to drop onto their opponent's screen by lining up three rows of blocks or more. In pin up, each time the player manages to destroy a row of three blocks, a bomb is dropped on the other half of the screen, destroying blocks that are covering up an anime picture. The goal is to destroy all the blocks revealing the complete picture, at which the player moves to the next level with another picture to uncover.
