= Tōgi Ō: King Colossus =

1992 video game

- Developer: Sega
- Publisher: Sega
- Designer: Toru Yoshida
- Platform: Mega Drive
- Release: JP: June 26, 1992
- Genre: Action-RPG
- Mode: Single-player

Tōgi Ō: King Colossus (闘技王 キング コロッサス) is a 1992 action-RPG video game developed and published by Sega for the Mega Drive. The game was never localized outside Japan, with an English fan translation patch releasing in 2006.

== Summary ==
The player controls the role of young fighter. He was raised by the local wise man in a small house somewhere in a fantasy world. After becoming a skilled swordsman, the hero is sent to the South Cave to dispatch some terrible monsters. Even more fearsome monsters are confronted in every new place until he finally challenges the bad guy who controls all the evil in the world.

There are real-time combat elements in addition to light role-playing elements. Weapons are equipped and used on monsters in real time. Obstacles must be overcome and items must be found in order to save the world.

== Development ==
The game was developed by manga artist Makoto Ogino.

== Release and reception ==
Reception

Review score
Publication	Score
Famicom Tsūshin	7/10, 8/10, 6/10, 5/10

Tōgi Ō: King Colossus was released in Japan for the Sega Mega Drive on June 26, 1992.

Critics in Famicom Tsūshin found the game similar to other contemporary games in terms of gameplay such as Ys, Romancing SaGa and The Legend of Zelda. Three reviewers in the magazine found it lacking unique features in terms of gameplay or narrative to make it stand out in this field. While two reviewers found themselves wanting to play it more despite the above flaws, another said the game was too difficult to warrant a recommendation.
