= Uzu Keobukseon =

1993 video game

- Title screen
- Developer: Samsung
- Publisher: Samsung
- Platform: Sega Mega Drive
- Release: KR: May 5, 1993
- Genre: Shoot 'em up
- Mode: Single-player

Uzu Keobukseon (우주거북선) (Space Turtle Ship) is a vertical scrolling shooter video game developed by Samsung in 1993 for the Sega Mega Drive, released only in Korea (the entire menu and dialogue was written in Korean). Players controlled the title ship, a purple and gold space-age battle cruiser designed as a turtle ship, complete with sails and oars, in eight various stages.

== Gameplay ==
While the game has a similar look and stage presentation to Toaplan shooters on the same console, the gameplay is similar to that of a shooter from Compile.

With each weapon the player collects, the ship earns an extra hit. Once the ship is hit by an attack, the ship degrades to the next selected weapon until the ship is down to its default weapon. The player can collect various power-ups for the Turtleship including Speed and Weapon power-ups. The ship has three weapons to select from including its default Normal Shot which spread out to seven shots when upgraded, a Ring shot which fired behind and in front of the ship and a Wave shot which fires the strongest. The player ship is also equipped with bombs and during every boss fight an energy meter shows up to display how much health the boss has left, although a Checkpoint system is active.

== Development ==
Uzu Keobukseon was developed internally by Samsung Electronics for the Mega Drive, marketed in South Korea as the Super Aladdin Boy. According to programmer Lee Yong-wook, planning began in May 1991 and development was completed in April 1992, although the game's release was delayed for approximately one year. The development team consisted of four people: two programmers, a planner and a graphic designer.

Lee explained that the team faced considerable technical difficulties because resources for developing 16-bit console games were limited in South Korea. The developers had to construct much of their technology themselves, including tools for producing the game's graphics. The decision to feature a futuristic turtle ship was intended to draw upon a recognisable symbol of Korean history while creating a distinctive domestic video game.

In May 1993, Game Champ reported that Samsung had signed a game development agreement with Sega Enterprises in December 1992. Following Uzu Keobukseon, Samsung announced plans to develop two additional Korean-language action games before the end of 1993. One was described as a side-scrolling action game similar to Streets of Rage 2, while the other was planned as a competitive fighting game.
