= Mystical Fighter (video game) =

1991 video game

- North American box art
- Developer: KID
- Publishers: JP: Taito; NA: DreamWorks
- Platform: Sega Genesis
- Release: JP: October 25, 1991; NA: March 1992
- Genre: Beat 'em up
- Modes: Single-player, multiplayer

Mystical Fighter, originally released in Japan as Maō Renjishi (魔王連獅子, Demon King Renjishi) is a beat 'em up game for the Sega Genesis.

The story, designs and characters are based on Japanese mythology.

== Development ==
The game was planned to come out in the West as Kabuki, but the title was changed prior to release. This was possibly to avoid confusion with the unrelated game Kabuki: Quantum Fighter for the NES—a mistake that Mega Play magazine did commit.

== Gameplay ==
Like in most games of the genre, the player (who controls a kabuki) can use combos, flips and swings to fight against tough opponents, battling them in groups from three to five. Surprisingly, boss fights are often easier than regular enemies. There is also a time limit, usually about forty seconds, for the player to finish the stage. If the time reaches zero before the stage is beaten, the player will automatically lose the game as it will be declared a defeat. Similar to Golden Axe, the player can use a special magic power, but instead of bottles the player must manually pick up scrolls. The more scrolls the player has, the stronger the magic attack will be; if the player chooses to use this attack, all the scrolls will be consumed.

There are also hidden bonus stages that can be accessed if the player approaches certain doors or rooms. These bonus stages contain magic scrolls, items to refill the character's health bar and weapons. There are also traps and holes that the player and the enemies can fall into. The traps and pits do not always hinder the player, and in fact can be beneficial if the enemies are thrown directly into the pit.
