= Trampoline Terror! =

1990 video game

- Developer: NCS
- Publisher: DreamWorks
- Platform: Genesis
- Release: NA: 1990
- Genre: Action
- Mode: Single-player

Trampoline Terror! is an overhead view action video game with strategy elements developed by NCS and published by DreamWorks in 1990 for the Genesis exclusively in North America. A Japanese release under the name Explode Star was planned, but was cancelled.

== Gameplay ==
The player, who is the titular Trampoline Terror, must put a halt to the aliens who are trying to take over the planet Ahas after kidnapping their queen.

Players must defuse bombs by walking over their destruction sequences while at the same time avoiding enemies. Trampolines can only be jumped on a few times before breaking, at which point the square they had occupied becomes useless. If the player jumps on this square again, he falls to his death. Powerballs can be picked up in limited numbers in order to defeat the villains that impede the player's path. Each level in the game is a 16x16 grid containing various obstacles, tiles, and strategically placed trampolines with which the character is able to interact. While players can jump on the tiles as often as they want without the squares ever breaking, they are not as versatile as the trampolines. Upon having exhausted their reserve of extra lives, players can choose the "continue" option, and are awarded five extra lives with which to continue the game.

There are thirty-three levels in the game, with varied degrees of difficulty.
