= Ball Jacks =

1993 video game

- Japanese cover art
- Developer: Namco
- Publisher: Namco
- Composers: Yoshinori Kawamoto; H. Umino
- Platform: Mega Drive
- Release: JP: April 23, 1993; EU: June 1993
- Genre: Action
- Modes: Single-player; Multiplayer

Ball Jacks (ボールジャックス, Bōru Jakkusu) is a 1993 action video game developed and published by Namco for the Mega Drive in Japan and Europe.

== Gameplay ==
A two-player match is taking place.

Ball Jacks is a futuristic action game that involves an ultra-competitive sporting event. Two robot crabs are controlled by men who play the game merely to become wealthy and famous. There is a conveyor belt behind them that spews metal balls at them. The goal is to capture balls that belong to the opponent and keep them from him until time runs out. Balls can also be knocked out from the mechanical hands of the opponent. All damaged crabs must return to the pit area for a quick maintenance and repair session.

There are several modes: a world championship against increasingly tougher opponents, a multiplayer versus mode, a training mode, and a time trial where the time limit is the only foe.

== Reception ==
Reception

Review score
Publication	Score
Mega	9%

The game was poorly received, with Andy Dyer criticising the graphics, sound, gameplay and size.
