= Eliminate Down =

1993 video game

- Developer: Aprinet
- Publisher: Soft Vision
- Designer: A. Tomonaga
- Programmer: Junji Takahashi
- Artists: J. Inoue; M. Hirata
- Composer: Tatsuya Matsumoto
- Platform: Mega Drive
- Release: JP: 25 June 1993
- Genre: Scrolling shooter
- Mode: Single-player

Eliminate Down (Note: Japanese: エリミネートダウン, Hepburn: Erimineto Daun) is a scrolling shooter developed by Aprinet and published by Soft Vision for the Mega Drive/Genesis. It was released in Japan on June 25, 1993. Eliminate Down gives players immediate access to three directional-based weapons that can all be powered up as they fight strange alien enemies through eight levels.

== Gameplay ==
The player fights one of many minibosses in Stage 3.

Reminiscent of Hellfire, the Steel Pyron has three firing directional weapons all ready at the player's disposal: a forward firing blaster, a rear laser attack and diagonal, four-way firing bombs. The forward firing attack also has the Super Crash Shot, a small white straight-firing rocket, that with upgrades changes into a long white laser beam that can fire through foreground objects. Unlike Hellfire however, the game has no checkpoint system, though the game makes players restart a level once they lose all of their lives. Extends are set at every 100,000 points.

The weapons are upgradeable by collecting Power-Up icons; obtaining a certain number of Power-Ups level-ups the size and strength of the player's weapons, but the weapons are upgradable to just three different levels. The only other defenses the players has is a shield pick-up called the Barrier that protects the ship for at least two hits. The A and C buttons allow the player to switch among the three weapons. Players can also change the speed of the ship by pausing the game and adjusting the speed level on the pause screen.

Eliminate Down also has a mini-game playable at the main menu similar to Concentration where players have to find the right image under a certain time limit.

== Plot ==
Mankind has begun its space pioneering era as the 30th century is about to begin, but an alien race known as the Amuleto appears out of a space distortion and travels toward the Earth. Its intentions prove hostile as human investigations are destroyed and the Amuleto space fleet grows. Mankind's best chance against the invaders is the Steel Pyron, a space fighter designed for multiple combat situations and warp drive jumping.

== Reception ==
Reception

Review scores
Publication	Score
Beep! MegaDrive	6.75/10
Famitsu	6/10, 6/10, 6/10, 6/10
Dengeki Mega Drive	58/100, 55/100, 42/100, 40/100
Hippon Super!	7/10

Eliminate Down received mixed reception from critics.
