= Shadow Blasters =

1990 video game

- North American cover art
- Developer: Sigma Pro-Tech
- Publishers: JP: Sigma Enterprises; NA: Sage's Creation
- Designers: T. Mura; Goro Tama "TS‑25"
- Programmers: "X Y Z"; Hiroshi Sato
- Artist: "Suttako‑Tetsu"
- Composer: Kim Songdong
- Platform: Sega Genesis
- Release: JP: August 10, 1990; NA: 1990
- Genre: Platform
- Modes: Single-player, multiplayer

Shadow Blasters (四天明王 Shiten-Myooh) is a platform game developed by Sigma Pro-Tech for the Sega Genesis in 1990. It was released in Japan and in North America in a localized form.

== Gameplay ==
Shadow Blasters is a side-scrolling platform game. The player(s) can control one character at a time and can choose from a pool of four characters. Each character is able to walk, jump, crouch, and fire a projectile weapon unique to that character. For the most part, the player is free to move forward and backward through a given level as desired. As the player progresses, characters become stronger by obtaining power-ups for the attributes of speed, jump, and power. Power-ups do not "roll over" into the character pool if the current character is at the maximum for the respective attribute, meaning a character can only gain attribute points from a power-up if that character is in play when it is collected.

The player can choose from four characters, each of whom has four distinct stages to their respective weapons. The player can switch characters at any point during gameplay simply by going to the character select screen and choosing a different character. While this is a powerful asset, once a character dies, he or she cannot ever be revived. This effectively limits the total "lives" of the player to four and once the last character is dead, the game is over.

The first part of the game consists of six levels: Mountain, Street, Glen, Harbor, Forest, and Future. (In the Japanese version of the game, Glen was originally named Meadow, and Mountain was originally named Rock.)

One unique aspect of this game is that these six levels may be played in any order the player desires. The second part of the game consists of two levels (Hell and Heaven), and then a final showdown against the antagonist Ashura, with the battle taking place in outer space.

== Plot ==
The evil god Ashura has unleashed hordes of monsters and demons onto Earth, hoping to take control of the planet as well as the hearts of men. The good god Hyperion has recruited four of Earth's most powerful warriors and assembled them into a team to fight the encroaching darkness and defeat Ashura: the ninja warriors named Kotarou and Ayame, a Buddhist fighting monk named Kidenbou, and a fencer named Senshirou. (In the game's English localization, their names were changed to Horatio, Tiffany, Marco, and Leo, respectively.)
