= Marsupilami (video game) =

1995 video game

- Developer: Apache Software
- Publisher: Sega
- Producers: Paul Chamberlain, Patricia Sorrell
- Programmer: Mark Page
- Composer: Matthew Owens
- Platform: Sega Genesis
- Release: EU: October 27, 1995; NA: May 1996
- Genre: Action Puzzle-platformer
- Mode: Single-player

Marsupilami is a 1995 video game based on the comic book series of the same name developed by British studio Apache Software and published by Sega for the Genesis in 1995–1996.

== Gameplay ==
The player controls the eponymous Marsupilami who escapes with his elephant friend Bonelli after being captured from their home in the jungle and brought to the circus by the hunter Bring M. Backalive. The games features a side-scrolling perspective and each level is completed when both Marsupilami and Bonelli have reached the right end of the stage. To help Bonelli reach the end, Marsupilami must face a variety of enemies and use his tail's power ups and abilities to allow the elephant to navigate the level.

The primary concern of each level is getting Bonelli to the finish line. Marsupilami can interact with certain elements of his environment to create a pathway for Bonelli. This can take the form of pushing certain objects, whipping them with his tail, or standing on buttons. Bonelli, who is constantly moving back and forth, can be ridden, temporarily stopped on things like elevators by being fed fruit, used to drink water and put out fires, or sent walking in the opposite direction by being whipped. The player is also given up to four of the nine total power ups in each level. Power ups allow Marsupilami to shape his tail into useful tools that aid Bonelli in traversing the level. The power ups are as follows:

- Stairs — Allows Bonelli to climb over objects
- Mouse — Scares Bonelli into charging in the opposite direction, which can be used to make the elephant destroy obstacles
- Shield — Used to protect Bonelli from falling objects
- Parachute — Allows Marsupilami to have a slower, guided fall
- Hammer — Gives Marsupilami the ability to destroy obstacles
- Pole Vault — Gives Marsupilami the ability to fling himself high into the air over large gaps
- Spring — Allows Marsupilami to launch himself upward to reach high places
- Winch — Gives Marsupilami the ability to hoist up Bonelli when the elephant is eating fruit
- Lever — Allows Marsupilami to use his tail to dislodge large objects

Other items that can be collected include hearts and stars, which replenish Marsupilami's health and an alarm clock which gives the player 30 additional seconds to complete the level. A variety of enemies must also be defeated by being whipped to reach the end of each level. At various points of the game, the player is given hints on which power ups to use.

The game consists of eight worlds of three levels each, which are followed by unique boss battle levels. After defeating each boss, the player is given a bonus level in which they either fight Mars the Black or collect litter from the ocean. The player is allowed to progress regardless of whether they beat the bonus level.

Several levels were changed from the European release of the game in the North American release. Most of these changes alter which power ups the player is given and which obstacles are encountered and generally make the game easier. The North American version also gives players the choice to select the options menu on the home screen.

== Reception ==
Reception

Review scores
Publication	Score
AllGame	3.5/5
Electronic Gaming Monthly	6.25/10 (Note: Four critics of Electronic Gaming Monthly gave the game each a score of 6/10, 5.5/10, 6.5/10, and 7/10.)
EP Daily	6/10
HobbyConsolas	82%
Joypad	84%
Mean Machines Sega	81%
Next Generation	2/5
Player One	90%
Sega Saturn Magazine	82%

The game received average reviews. Next Generation said, "all in all, Marsupilami is a traditional side-scrolling platform game with the gameplay aimed toward a younger audience. If you're searching for the same old gameplay, Marsupilami is for you." Spanish magazine HobbyConsolas, however, gave it 82%. GamePro summed up the review by saying, "Marsupilami is packaged as a kid's game, but the stiff controls and quick timer make the puzzle solving tough and may drive younger gamers to tears. The perky, comical animations are pleasant enough, but the plucky, happy circus music grates. In short, keep this cart confined at your nearest retailer." (Note: GamePro gave the game 3.5/5 for graphics, 3/5 for sound, 1.5/5 for control, and 2.5/5 for fun factor.)
