= Chōkyūkai Miracle Nine =

1995 video game

- Developer: Sega
- Publisher: Sega
- Composer: Naofumi Hataya
- Platform: Mega Drive
- Release: JP: July 21, 1995
- Genre: Traditional baseball simulation
- Modes: Single-player, multiplayer

Chōkyūkai Miracle Nine (超球界ミラクルナイン, Super Baseball World Miracle Nine) is an arcade-style baseball video game for the Sega Mega Drive released exclusively in Japan.

== Summary ==
This video game features super deformed Pawapuro-like characters along with all twelve teams from the Nippon Professional Baseball League's 1995 season. There is an option for simplified play and games as little as three innings.

== Reception ==
On release, Famicom Tsūshin scored the game a 23 out of 40.
