= Earth Defense =

1995 video game

Earth Defense The Earth Defend
- Developer: AV Artisan
- Publisher: Realtec
- Platform: Mega Drive/Genesis
- Release: NA: 1995; TWN: 1995
- Genre: Scrolling shooter
- Modes: Single-player, multiplayer

Earth Defense (Chinese: 地球防衛戰; pinyin: Dìqiú Fángwèi Zhàn), showm as The Earth Defend on the title screen, is a vertically scrolling shooter for the Mega Drive/Genesis. The game is unlicensed; it was developed by AV Artisan and published by Realtec in both North America and Taiwan without a license from Sega.

The cartridge and box shapes as well as quality in graphics and box art are identical to AV Artisan's previous games Funny World & Balloon Boy and Mallet Legend's Whac-a-Critter, both published by Realtec. The player takes on the role of a jet pilot assigned to liberate five world continents from a technologically advanced army. Earth Defense allows two-player simultaneous multiplayer.

== Gameplay ==
=== Weapons ===
Players can choose from two types of weapons: a vulcan/spread shot weapon and a wave/beam shot weapon. Rather than possessing bomb-like items, the players have a shield item that make the ship temporarily invulnerable.

=== Levels ===
1. Brazil, South America
2. Washington, North America
3. Siberia, Russia
4. China, Asia
5. Nigeria, Africa

== Compatibility ==
The game cannot be played through a Sega 32X. The game must be put directly into the Sega Genesis' cartridge slot. When the game is inserted into a Sega 32X, the RealTec logo will show up, but the Sega Genesis will keep resetting itself. The game will not run at all on the Majesco Sega Genesis 3.
