= Dinosaurs for Hire (video game) =

1993 video game

- Cover art
- Developer: Sega Interactive Development Division
- Publisher: Sega
- Director: Mark Nausha
- Producer: Stu Kosoy
- Programmers: Christopher Warner; Robert Morgan; John Kuwaye; Steven Lashower; Jack Loh; David Chaplin; Mike Terlecki
- Artists: Dave Russ; Art Wong; Albert Co; Todd Tomlinson; Doug Nishimura; Barbara Meyers
- Writer: Mike Latham
- Composers: Paul Gadbois; Dave Delia
- Platform: Sega Genesis
- Release: NA: October 1993
- Genres: Platform, shoot 'em up
- Modes: Single-player, multiplayer

Dinosaurs for Hire is a 1993 platform shoot 'em up video game developed and published by Sega for the Sega Genesis. The game is based on the Dinosaurs for Hire comic book series by Malibu Comics. The gameplay sees the player using guns to take down enemies and bosses in a variety of levels as one of three playable characters.

== Gameplay ==
Dinosaurs for Hire is a platform shoot 'em up game. It features three playable dinosaur mercenaries from the comics: Archie, a Tyrannosaurus; Lorenzo, a Triceratops; and Reese, a Stegosaurus. The player's goal is to stop a dictator, who has unleashed mutant dinosaurs in a plot for world domination. The game has five levels, which are divided into subsections. Level locations include the Empire State Building, Hoover Dam, and a Hollywood film set.

A variety of enemies are encountered in each level, including bikers, hang-gliding gunmen, skateboarders, giant insects, and ninjas. Giant boss enemies are encountered at the end of each level. Cyrano, a Pteranodon, appears throughout the game to offer advice on boss battles. The game has three difficulty settings, and includes a two-player mode.

== Development and release ==
Sega employee Mike Latham was a fan of comic books, including Dinosaurs for Hire, and he pushed for the company to create a video game adaptation. In 1992, Sega reached a licensing deal with Malibu Comics to create such a game, through Sega Interactive Development Division. Latham devised the basic storyline, and Sega spent a year designing the game. Tom Mason, the comics' creator, offered advice and answered questions as a consultant early in development. Sega wanted the game to include a flying creature, leading to Cyrano's creation. Aside from his game appearance, Cyrano was also introduced in the comics. Cyrano was designed by Mason, and initially was planned as a fourth playable character.

Mark Nausha and Stu Kosoy respectively served as the project's director and producer. The game's engine, titled "Lobster", was programmed by Christopher Warner and Robert Morgan; the rest of the programming team consisted of John Kuwaye, Steven Lashower, Jack Loh, David Chaplin, and Mike Terlecki. The graphics were created by Dave Russ, Art Wong, Albert Co, Todd Tomlinson, Doug Nishimura, and Barbara Meyers. The music was composed by Paul Gadbois and Dave Delia.

Dinosaurs for Hire had been scheduled for a May 1993 release. Test groups responded favorably to the game, prompting Sega to put it back into development to add additional features, including more explosions and "smart-aleck remarks" according to Mason. The game was published by Sega, and released in North America in October 1993.

== Reception ==
Reception

Review scores
Publication	Score
Mean Machines Sega	69/100
Video Games (DE)	40%
Mega	35%
MegaTech	64/100
Sega Power	63%
Sega Pro	83%
Sega Zone	58%
TodoSega	91/100

Dinosaurs for Hire was generally criticized for its gameplay, which was seen as average and unoriginal. Paul Mellerick of Mega called it "a very poor game by anybody's standards and it's just far too easy to be worth any merit whatsoever". GamePro opined that Dinosaurs for Hire needed more difficulty and a wider variety of gameplay. Tom Guise of MegaTech considered the game mediocre and called it "ambitious in places, but ultimately poor". He criticized the controls, saying that it is "extremely hard to aim the gun diagonally without the dinosaur shuffling in that direction, right off the edge of a platform". Reviewers for Electronic Gaming Monthly concluded that it was an entertaining shoot 'em up overall, but found that the programming "looks shoddy and rushed" at times. Nick Merritt of Sega Pro enjoyed the game: "It's got a well judged difficulty level, the baddies are varied and interesting and it all moves along at a decent pace".

The visuals received some criticism. According to Karen Levell of Sega Power, "the graphics are hardly state-of-the-art, with the occasional single-layered parallax being the pinnacle of achievement". Critics found the two-player mode difficult, as players must keep up with each other onscreen or otherwise lose energy. Guise considered the multiplayer mode "almost unplayable", while Levell found that it adds variety, despite being "frustrating at times".

Andrew Reiner of Game Informer reviewed Dinosaurs for Hire in 2013 and said that seeing dinosaurs as protagonists in a Contra-like sidescroller was "fascinating" and "weird". In 2014, John Sczepaniak of Hardcore Gaming 101 wrote that the game has "explosive first impressions" and good ideas but is "never quite as excellent as it promises". He was disappointed by the weapon selection and found that the characters all play the same, although he praised the graphics and sound.
