= Bass Masters Classic =

1995 video game

- Developers: Black Pearl Software; Natsume (GBC)
- Publishers: Malibu Games (SNES); Black Pearl Software (Genesis); THQ (GBC)
- Platforms: Sega Genesis; SNES; Game Boy Color
- Release: 1995

Bass Masters Classic is a 1995 fishing video game developed by Chicago-based studio Black Pearl Software. It was developed with the help of the Bass Anglers Sportsman Society.

== Gameplay ==
In Bass Masters Classic, players compete in a series of bass fishing tournaments, progressing from local to regional competitions before reaching the prestigious Classic. Players start by selecting one of nine available fishermen and then visit the bait shop to gear up. The shop offers six specialized bait types, along with a choice of fishing lines, rods, engines, and fish finders to customize the setup.

== Reception ==
Reception

Review scores
Publication	Score
Next Generation	3/5 (SMD)
Game Informer	8.25/10
Game Players	82%
VideoGames & Computer Entertainment	8/10

Game Informer game the SNES version of the game a score of 8.25 out of 10, stating:" would've liked to see more terrain beneath the surface, but maybe that's for a sequel. Bassmasters is a quality fishin' cart, so if you like Black Bass this one is worth some play time".

Next Generation reviewed the Genesis version of the game, rating it three stars out of five, and stated that "Basically, this game is loaded with extras and so patient gamers may even enjoy the slow paced sim fishing. Still, for the most part, Bass Masters Classic is strictly for fishing fanatics."

The game sold 200,000 copies.
