= Online console gaming =

Type of electronic gaming

Online console gaming involves connecting a console to a network over the Internet for services. Through this connection, it provides users the ability to play games with other users online, in addition to other online services.

The three most common networks now are Microsoft's Xbox network, Sony's PlayStation Network, and Nintendo's Nintendo Switch Online and Nintendo Network (discontinued on April 8, 2024). These networks feature cross platform capabilities which allows users to use a single account. However, the services provided by both are still limited to the console connected (e.g. an Xbox One cannot download an Xbox 360 game, unless the game is part of the Xbox 360 to Xbox One backwards compatibility program).

Additional services provided by these networks include the capability of buying additional games, online chatting, downloadable content, and game demos.

== Early attempts ==
The earliest experiments relating to online connectivity on game consoles were done as far back as the early 1980s. For some consoles, Dial-Up internet connectivity was made available through the use of special cartridges, along with an adapter. The GameLine for the Atari 2600 and the PlayCable for the Intellivision are two notable examples of this. Services like these did not have multiplayer online gaming capability, but did allow users to download games from a central server and play them, usually requiring a fee for continued access. However, neither the GameLine or PlayCable attained mainstream popularity and both services were shut down during the 1983 video game crash.

During the 1990s a number of online gaming networks were introduced for home consoles, but due to a multitude of problems they failed to make a significant impact on the console gaming industry. For a number of years such networks were limited to the Japanese market. In a November 1996 interview, Shigeru Miyamoto remarked that online multiplayer gaming had not achieved mainstream success, and would not for a long while yet, because the technology of the time could not provide the quick-and-easy startup that general consumers would want from a "plug and play" console.

The first online initiative by Nintendo was the Family Computer Network System for the Famicom, only released for Japan in 1988. This device allowed users to access things such as game cheats, stock trades, weather reports, and some downloadable content for their games. It failed to catch on.

The Sega Net Work System (Sega Meganet) was a network service in Japan for people using the Sega Mega Drive. Debuting in 1990, this service worked with the Game Toshokan (literally meaning "Game Library") cartridge to download games on the console (meaning that the game would have to be re-downloaded each time). Players attached a Mega Modem (modem, with a speed of 1,600 to 2,400 bit/s) to the "EXT" DE-9 port on the back of the Mega Drive, and used it to dial up other players to play games. There was a monthly fee of ¥800. The service was also in North America under the name "Tele-Genesis" at the Winter Consumer Electronics Show (Winter CES) in January 1990, but it was never released for the region.

Sega then brought a similar online service to North America, the Sega Channel, debuted in December 1994. Sega Channel provided users the opportunity to download new games straight to their consoles with the purchase of a cartridge similar sold through General Instruments. The service cost $15 (USD) per month and at one point had over 250,000 American subscribers while also building a following overseas but Sega decided to halt the project and provide an online portal in their new console the Sega Saturn.

AT&T unveiled the Edge-16, an online gaming peripheral which featured simultaneous voice and data transmission, at the 1993 Consumer Electronics Show. However, AT&T cancelled it in 1994, having decided that its $150 (USD) price tag and lack of a match-up service (meaning players would have to find someone to play with on the network themselves) would prevent it from achieving any popularity.

In 1994 an American company, Catapult Entertainment, developed the XBAND, a 3rd party peripheral which provided customers the ability to connect with other users and play games through network connections. The peripheral cost $19.99 (USD) and required a monthly fee of $4.95 (USD) for 50 sessions/month or $9.95 (USD) for unlimited use. The XBAND supported the Super NES and Sega Genesis consoles and received a mushrooming installed base (the number of users quadrupled over the second half of 1995), but once the Super NES and Sega Genesis's popularity faded the peripheral was discontinued.

The Satellaview was launched in mid-1995 for the Super Famicom in Japan. The access provided downloadable versions of hit games free to the user but required the user to download the games only at certain times over satellite, in a fashion similar to recording a TV show.

NET Link for the Sega Saturn provided users the ability to surf the web, check email, and play multiplayer games online. Released in 1996, the modem peripheral cost $199 (USD) and came with a web browser program and a free month of access. Despite the device's low price, strong functionality, and prominent marketing, less than 1% of Saturn owners purchased the NetLink in 1996, an outcome cited as evidence that the idea of online console gaming had not yet achieved widespread interest. Phil Harrison of Sony Computer Entertainment commented on the issue of online console gaming during a 1997 round table discussion:

I think online gaming is a little bit of a myth. A lot of consumers, when asked if they would like online gaming, automatically say yes because they don't actually know what it is - very few people have actually had the experience. It's like asking someone if they would like a Ferrari. They say yes but then discover it costs a lot to run, it's going to be in the shop all the time, and it's going to guzzle gas. And currently this is the experience most consumers get when they play online.

The first home console with built-in internet connection, the Apple Pippin, was launched in 1996. However, its $599 price tag kept it from effectively competing with other internet gaming options (by comparison, the Sega Saturn and its separately sold Netlink device combined cost less than $400).

The Philips CD-i and its CD-Online service (released in 1996) also rang up at less than the Pippin, but suffered from mediocre functionality.

In 1999 Nintendo decided to take another shot at online gaming with the Nintendo 64DD. The new peripheral was delayed often and only released in Japan, it provided users to connect with each other and share in-game art and designs and even play games online, after purchasing the peripheral for 30,000 yen. The 64DD failed to impact gamers as it was released shortly before Nintendo announced the release of its new console, the GameCube, and only nine games would be released supporting the new peripheral.

== Sixth generation consoles ==
=== Dreamcast ===
SegaNet became a short-lived internet service operated by Sega, geared for dial-up based online gaming on their Dreamcast game console. A replacement for Sega's original, PC-only online gaming service, Heat.net, it was initially quite popular when launched on September 10, 2000. Unlike a standard ISP, game servers would be connected directly into SegaNet's internal network, providing very low connection latency between the consoles and servers along with standard Internet access. ChuChu Rocket! was the first online multiplayer game for the Dreamcast.

=== Playstation 2 ===
The PlayStation 2 gained online functionality between July 2001 and June 2003 depending on region. There was no unified service and thus no official name so it was often referred to as PS2 Network Play, PS2 Network Gaming, PS2 Online, or Net Play in the PAL region. Because of this any online functionality was the responsibility of the game publisher and was run on third-party servers. Online play was originally achieved through the use of an accessory Network Adapter but was a built in feature of the later slim consoles and allowed the connection of an Ethernet cable or in some markets a phone-line port for dial-up connection. The highly acclaimed Tony Hawk's Pro Skater 3 was the first online title, and joint release in the NA and EU markets with SOCOM U.S. Navy SEALs, which had online voice chat, helped drive success.

== Modern networks ==
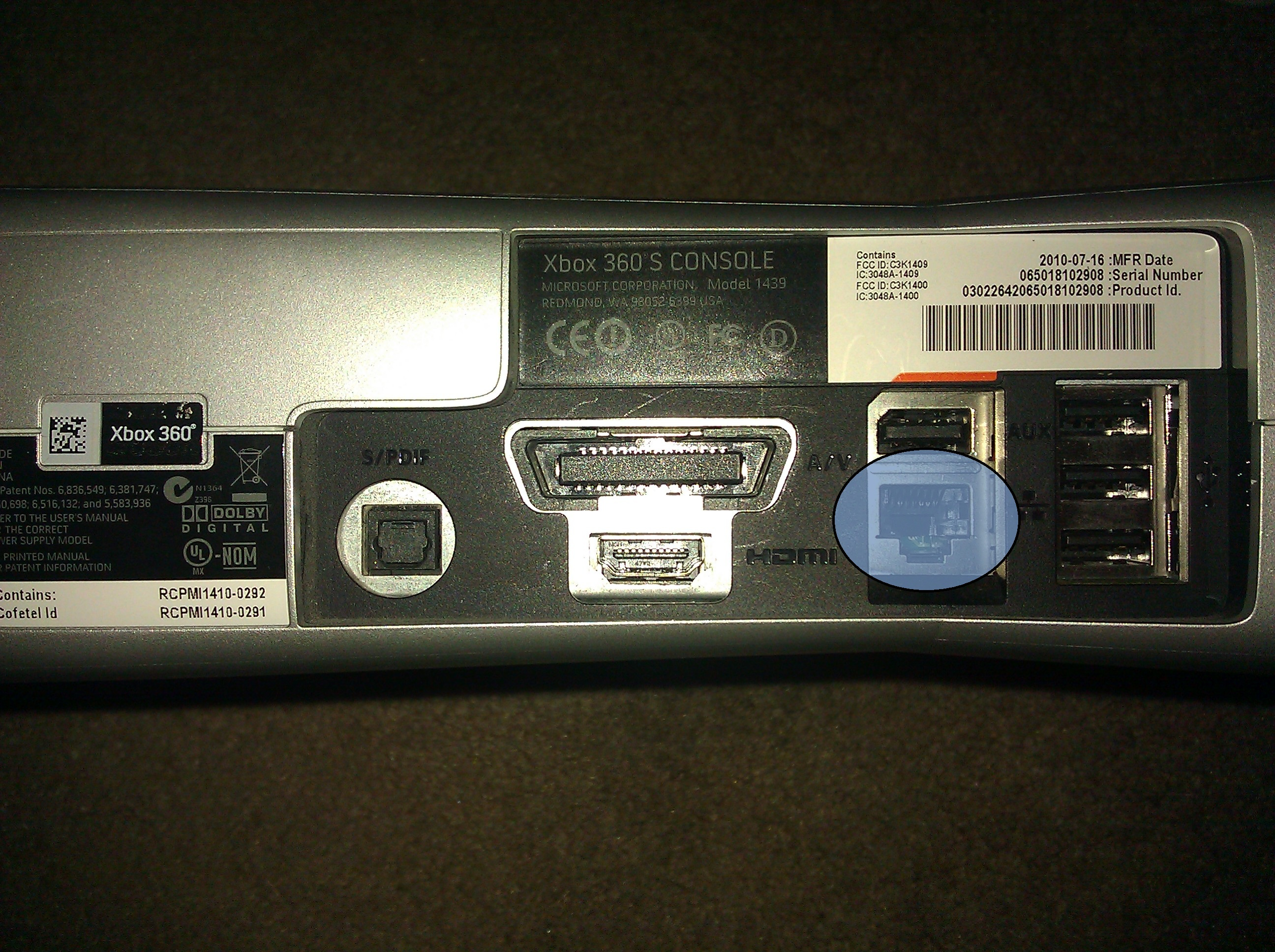
Modern consoles include an Ethernet port to allow users to plug into the consoles online gaming network. This is the location of the Ethernet port on the Xbox 360 Slim model.

=== Xbox network (formerly Xbox Live) ===
Xbox network, originally branded as Xbox Live, is an online multiplayer gaming and digital media delivery service created and operated by Microsoft Corporation. It was first made available to the Xbox system in 2002. An updated version of the service became available for the Xbox 360 console at that system's launch in 2005. The service was extended in 2007 on the Windows platform, named Games for Windows – Live, which makes most aspects of the system available on Windows computers. Microsoft has announced plans to extend Live to other platforms such as handhelds and mobile phones as part of the Live Anywhere initiative. With Microsoft's Windows Phone 7, full Xbox Live functionality was integrated into new Windows Phones that launched in late 2010.

The Xbox Live service is available as both a free and subscription-based service, known as Xbox Live Free and Xbox Live Gold respectively, with several features such as online gaming restricted to the Gold service. Prior to October 2010, the free service was known as Xbox Live Silver. It was announced on June 10, 2011, that the service would be fully integrated into Microsoft's Windows 8.

Xbox Live continued to be offered as part of Microsoft's future consoles, the Xbox One and the Xbox Series X and Series S, as well as with integration with Windows 10 and Windows 11. The Xbox Live Gold subscription was also bundled as part of the Xbox Game Pass Ultimate service, providing both the Xbox Live services and the library of games offered from Xbox Game Pass. Microsoft rebranded the service as simply Xbox network in March 2021. By January 2021, Microsoft reported that there were more than 100 million Xbox network subscribers (including those through the Xbox Game Pass subscription).

=== PlayStation Network ===
PlayStation Network, often abbreviated as PSN, is an online multiplayer gaming and digital media delivery service provided/run by Sony Computer Entertainment for use with the PlayStation 3, PlayStation 4, PlayStation 5, PlayStation Portable and PlayStation Vita video game consoles. The PlayStation Network is free to use, giving the user an identity for their online presence and to earn trophies in games.

==== PlayStation Plus ====
A paid subscription atop the PlayStation Network, PlayStation Plus, provides additional features such as the ability to play online games (otherwise not offered as free-to-play) and cloud saving for supported games. In additional, Plus subscribers gain access to free games and special deals on the PlayStation Store on a monthly basis. By October 2021, Sony reported that there were over 47.2 million PlayStation Plus subscribers.

=== Nintendo Network ===
The Nintendo Network is Nintendo's second online service after Nintendo Wi-Fi Connection to provide online play for Nintendo 3DS and Wii U compatible games. It was announced on January 26, 2012, at an investor's conference. Nintendo's president Satoru Iwata said, "Unlike Nintendo Wi-Fi Connection, which has been focused upon specific functionalities and concepts, we are aiming to establish a platform where various services available through the network for our consumers shall be connected via Nintendo Network service so that the company can make comprehensive proposals to consumers." Nintendo's plans include personal accounts for Wii U, digitally distributed packaged software, and paid downloadable content.

==== Wii (Online) ====
The Wii console is able to connect to the Internet through its built-in 802.11b/g Wi-Fi or through a USB-to-Ethernet adapter, with both methods allowing players to access the established Nintendo Wi-Fi Connection service. Wireless encryption by WEP, WPA (TKIP/RC4) and WPA2 (CCMP/AES) are supported. AOSS support was discreetly added in System Menu version 3.0. Just as for the Nintendo DS, Nintendo does not charge fees for playing via the service and the 12 digit Friend Code system controls how players connect to one another. Each Wii also has its own unique 16 digit Wii Code for use with Wii's non-game features. This system also implements console-based software including the Wii Message Board. One can also connect to the internet with third-party devices.

==== Nintendo Switch Online ====
Like the Wii online service, the Nintendo Switch Online service allows users of the Nintendo Switch to play various multiplayer games online (outside of those offered as free-to-play titles). The service also offers access to a selection of emulated Nintendo Entertainment System and Super Nintendo Entertainment System games for free, as well as other free games such as Tetris 99. An Expansion Pass, added in October 2021, expanded this emulation service to include select Nintendo 64 and Sega Genesis games. Subscribers also had access to unique offers for certain products, such as special Joy-Con controllers for the emulated games.

Nintendo reported by September 2021 that the Nintendo Switch Online had reached 32 million subscribers.
