= Sega Channel =

Online game service for the Sega Genesis

- The Sega Channel logo and mascot, Sega Pat
- Developer: Sega
- Type: Online service
- Launched: NA: December 12, 1994
- Discontinued: NA: July 31, 1998
- Platform: Sega Genesis
- Website: http://sega.com/channel

The Sega Channel was an online game service developed by Sega for the Sega Genesis video game console, serving as a content delivery system. Launched on December 12, 1994, the Sega Channel was provided to the public by TCI and Time Warner Cable through cable television services by way of coaxial cable. It was a pay to play service, through which customers could access Genesis games online, play game demos, and get cheat codes. Lasting until July 31, 1998, the Sega Channel operated three years after the release of Sega's next generation console, the Sega Saturn. Though criticized for its poorly timed launch and costly subscription fee, the Sega Channel has been praised for its innovations in downloadable content and impact on online game services.

== History ==
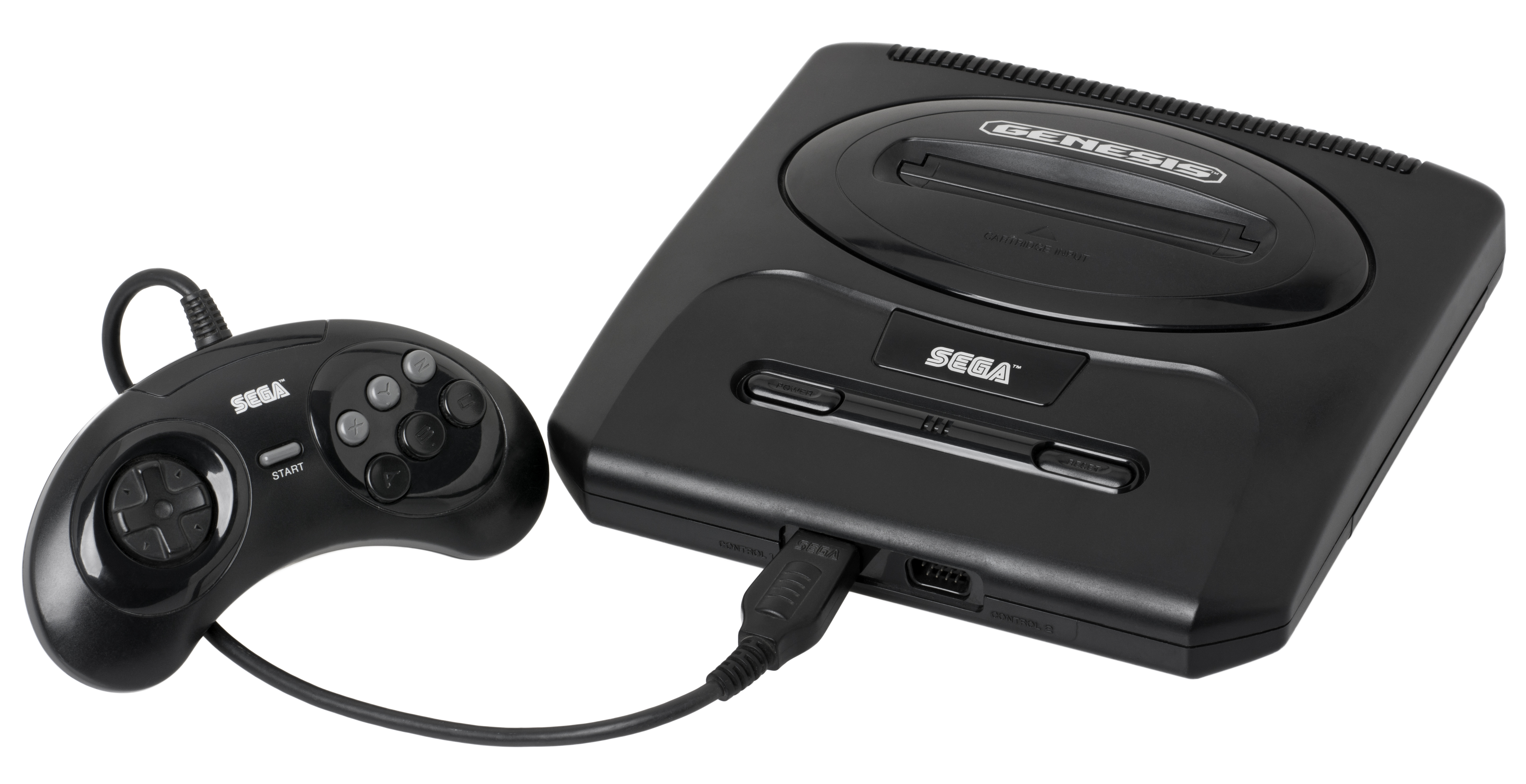
A Model 2 Sega Genesis, released in 1993

Released in Japan as the Mega Drive in 1988, North America in 1989, and Europe and other regions as the Mega Drive in 1990, the Sega Genesis was Sega's entry into the 16-bit era of video game consoles.

In 1990, Sega started its first internet-based service for Genesis, Sega Meganet, in Japan. Operating through a cartridge and a peripheral called the Mega Modem, it allowed Mega Drive owners to play 17 games online. A North American version, the "Tele-Genesis", was announced but never released. Another phone-based system, the Mega Anser, turned the Japanese Mega Drive into an online banking terminal. Due to Meganet's low number of games, high price, and the Mega Drive's lack of success in Japan, the system was a commercial failure. By 1992, the Mega Modem peripheral could be found in bargain bins at a reduced price, and a remodeled version of the Mega Drive released in 1993 removed the EXT 9-pin port, preventing connections to the Meganet service.

In April 1993, Sega announced the Sega Channel service, which would use cable television services to deliver content. In the US, national testing began in June, and deployment began in December, with a complete US release in 1994. By June 1994, 21 cable companies had signed up to carry the Sega Channel service. US fees varied depending on location, but were approximately US$15 monthly, plus a $25 activation fee, which included the adapter. The Sega Channel expanded into Canada in late 1995, with an approximately Can$19 monthly fee. During the planning stages of the service, Sega looked to capitalize on the rental market, which had seen some success with the Sega CD being rented through Blockbuster, and was looking to base the service's games and demos to sell more cartridges.

In early 1995, Sega CEO Hayao Nakayama ended development on the Sega Genesis and its add-ons, the Sega CD and 32X. This decision was made to support the Sega Saturn, which had been released in Japan already. This placed the release of the Sega Channel during the Genesis' decline from the market. At its peak, the Sega Channel had over 250,000 subscribers, but by 1997, the number had dropped to 230,000, two years after Nakayama shifted focus from the Genesis to the Saturn. Though Sega looked at options to bring the service to PCs, the rise of cable modems and Internet gaming drove away the demand for such a service. In late November of 1997 it was announced that the Sega Channel would be shut down on June 30, 1998, but it ended up staying on for another month, finally being discontinued on July 31, 1998.

== Technical aspects and specifications ==
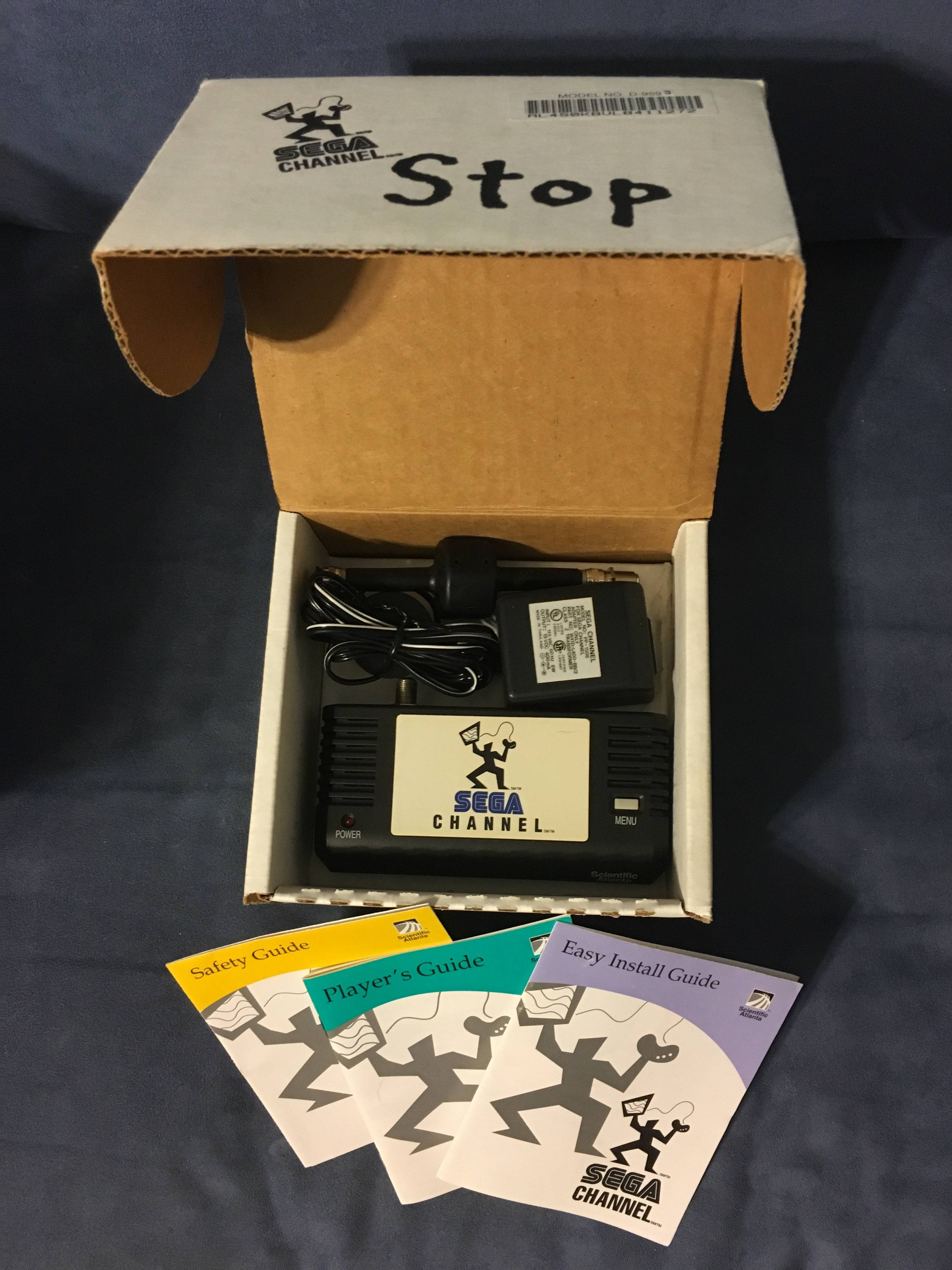
Scientific Atlanta Sega Channel adapter in original box complete with power adapter, coaxial adapter, and documentation

After making the initial purchase and paying the activation fee, Genesis owners would receive an adapter that would be inserted into the cartridge slot of the console. The adapter connected the console to a cable television wire, doing so by the use of a coaxial cable output in the rear of the cartridge. Starting up a Genesis console with an active Sega Channel adapter installed would prompt for the service's main menu to be loaded, which was a process that took approximately 30 seconds.

From there, gamers could access the content they wished to play and download it into their system, which could take up to a few minutes per game. Because two-way communication is not possible over a TV broadcast, all game data was continuously transmitted in a loop. Once the player would make their game selection, the Genesis would wait until the selected game appeared in the loop and then capture its data. This data would be downloaded into the adaptor's on-board 4 MB RAM, and would be deleted or removed when the system was powered off.

Programming and transmission of the Sega Channel's monthly services started with a production team at Sega, which would put together content every month and load it onto a CD-ROM. It was then sent to TCI's satellite station, located in Denver, Colorado. From the station, the signal was transmitted via Hughes Communications' Galaxy 7 satellite, which uploaded at 1.435 GHz and downloaded at 1.1 GHz, to the local cable providers. In Canada, and across South America and Europe, however, the satellite transmission stage was bypassed altogether in favor of direct uploads of the Sega Channel CD-ROM via a cable television headend. In order for the signal to function properly, it had to be clear of noise in order to prevent download interruptions. To ensure no issues, cable providers had to "clean" their broadcast signal.

== Games ==
Alien Soldier, a game which, while not available in North America in cartridge format, was available on the Sega Channel in that region

The Sega Channel service hosted up to 50 Genesis games at any one time. Titles would rotate monthly; however, some updates happened on a weekly basis. In 1997, Sega changed the number of games hosted at a time to 70 and the update frequency to biweekly. Games for the service included titles developed by Sega, such as Sonic & Knuckles, Eternal Champions, and Space Harrier II; as well as titles developed by licensees of Sega, such as Bubsy II and Aladdin. Some of these games had reduced content compared to their cartridge release so that they could fit the adapter's memory, such as Super Street Fighter II. The Sega Channel also hosted games in some regions that would not receive a cartridge release, such as Pulseman, Mega Man: The Wily Wars, and Alien Soldier, which were hosted on the service in North America. The service also offered demos of upcoming games, such as Primal Rage. Though games and demos rotated on a regular basis, categories into which games were placed remained static and did not change. With parental controls in mind, all games for the service received a rating from the Videogame Rating Council. The service also contained a lockout system, which would allow parents to set a passcode in order to access mature-rated content.

In addition to games and demos, the Sega Channel hosted other features. Cheat codes were directly accessible from the network, as well as game hints. The service also hosted contests, such as a promotion with Electronic Arts' Triple Play Baseball '96, and a 1995 event where players who completed Primal Rage during a brief 24-hour period where the full game was accessible were given a phone number to call, making them eligible to win prizes.

== Reception and legacy ==
During its lifetime, the Sega Channel won one of Popular Science's "Best of What's New" award for the year 1994. Likewise, in August 1995, a survey conducted by Sports Illustrated found that children between 9 and 13 years old were five times more likely to subscribe to the Sega Channel than to purchase a Sega Saturn or the upcoming Nintendo 64 or PlayStation. The service would go on to garner as many as 250,000 subscribers; however, Sega had anticipated having over one million subscribers by the end of its first year, and had made the service available to over 20 million households.

Retrospective reception of the Sega Channel praises its innovation and role in the development of online gaming, but criticizes its high subscription fees and timing into the market. IGN writer Adam Redsell noted how the Sega Channel caused many cable companies to clean their broadcast signals and its role in the development of high-speed internet, stating "...the very fact that you’re enjoying broadband internet right now could well be thanks to SEGA." Levi Buchanan, also writing for IGN, credited the Sega Channel with its role in the development of modern gaming and content delivery services, such as Xbox Live Arcade and PlayStation Network, stating: "SEGA and the entire industry learned important lessons from the SEGA Channel. SEGA was still committed to the idea of downloads and online, as evidenced by the Dreamcast's SegaNet... You can also see the DNA of early services like the SEGA Channel in modern portals like XBLA and PSN, where demos are now a staple." The staff of UGO Networks also credited the Sega Channel as an important step in the development of both services.

Ken Horowitz of Sega-16 criticizes Sega's poor timing of the launch of the Sega Channel and the subscription's high price. According to Horowitz: "Who would spend $13 a month to play games for a dying system? This horrendous blunder (one of many by Sega Enterprises) caused retailers to dump their inventory of systems, thereby sealing the fate of the Sega Channel once and for all." Buchanan echoes the same sentiments, stating, "Perhaps if the SEGA Channel had been released earlier in the console's lifecycle—the Genesis launched in 1989 in America—things might have turned out differently. After all, the service did gain notice for its advancement of gaming and technology." UGO also notes the potential the Sega Channel could have had with some more development time in the field of competitive multiplayer, stating: "If the Sega Channel had come a little earlier in the life of the Genesis it would have seen much more exposure, and maybe online play would have been feasible for games that could have been developed directly for the service."

In 2025, the Video Game History Foundation released over 140 Sega Channel ROMs, including menus, games, prototypes, and a demo for a Sega Genesis web browser. The collection has Sega Channel-exclusive game versions of Garfield: The Lost Levels and The Flintstones, which were previously believed lost. The ROMs had been acquired by the Foundation over the course of two years from former Sega Channel VP of Programming Michael Shorrock and a Sega fan who collected Sega Channel backup tapes. Shorrock also provided his own personal notes and presentations, revealing that a successor service for PC called "Express Games" was pitched to executives. VGHF stated that, with the exception of select demos of released games, the project has recovered almost every outstanding Sega Channel game, and believed that digital backup copies now exist for every unique Sega Genesis game released in the United States.

== See also ==
- Apple Arcade
- Family Computer Network System
- GameLine
- Nintendo Switch Online
- PlayCable
- PlayStation Network
- Satellaview
- Sega Meganet
- Sega NetLink
- Stadia
- Teleplay Modem
- XBAND
- Xbox Live
