= Teleplay Modem =

Unreleased modem prototype for the Nintendo Entertainment System

- The Teleplay Modem attached to a NES and a Sega Genesis
- Also known as: Ayota Modem
- Developer: Keith Rupp and Nolan Bushnell
- Type: Modem
- Released: Unreleased

The Teleplay Modem is an unreleased modem prototype for the Nintendo Entertainment System (NES) created by Keith Rupp and Nolan Bushnell, designed to eventually provide online play between NES, Sega Genesis, and Super Nintendo Entertainment System.

The first prototype, called the Ayota Modem, has a maximum speed of only 300 bit/s, too slow to render fullscreen NES quality graphics typical of an action game. It was unveiled at the 1992 Consumer Electronics Show in Las Vegas, where it received a fairly good reception.

Bushnell later dropped out of the project, and Keith Rupp founded the company Baton Technologies. He continued to develop the modem, changing its name to the Teleplay Modem, increasing the speed to 2400 bit/s. He conceived the idea of allowing cross-platform play between compatibly designed games for Nintendo and Sega systems. Three games were developed internally (Battle Storm, Terran Wars, and Sea Battle) but never released. Both Nintendo and Sega refused to license the Teleplay Modem or the games developed for it.

Sega instead licensed AT&T and PF.Magic to develop a modem for the Sega Genesis called the Edge 16, but AT&T ultimately dropped plans to release the device so that they could devote their attentions to developing new telephone technologies. The venture capitalists behind Baton Technologies feared competing against AT&T and attempting to sell hardware and games without the all-important licensing, so Baton was unable to fulfill its first $300,000 order, and quickly folded thereafter in mid-1993.

In an unrelated venture, Catapult Entertainment later developed the 2400 bit/s XBAND modem, similar to the Teleplay Modem in many respects. Although well funded by Viacom, Catapult failed to receive sufficient developer and gamer backing, folding in early 1997.

== See also ==
- Atari 2600's GameLine
- Intellivision's PlayCable
- Sega Genesis's Sega Channel
- Super Famicom's Satellaview
- Family Computer Network System
- XBAND
