= XBAND =

Online console gaming network

- The XBAND logo
- Developer: Catapult Entertainment
- Type: Online service
- Launched: November 17, 1994; 31 years ago
- Discontinued: April 30, 1997; 29 years ago
- Platforms: Sega Genesis; Super NES; Sega Saturn; IBM PC
- Status: Discontinued
- Members: 15,000
- Website: xband.com at the Wayback Machine (archived 1997-04-14)

XBAND (stylized as XBⱯND) was the first (Note: The Teleplay Modem predated XBAND by a few years as it was unveiled at the 1992 Consumer Electronics Show, but was ultimately shelved with only prototypes developed.) online console gaming network and was available for the Genesis and Super NES. It was produced by Catapult Entertainment in Cupertino, California. It is the only modem released in America to have been officially licensed by Nintendo. It debuted in various areas of the United States between November 1994 and June 1995 and was later released nationwide between October 2 and 8, 1995.

== History ==
The Genesis version of the XBAND was released in November 1994, with the Super NES version following in June 1995, and the Super Famicom version in April 1996. The Genesis version also works with the Genesis Nomad. In Brazil the Mega Drive service was released as the Mega Net 2, named after the Sega Meganet.

In 1995, Catapult Entertainment signed a deal with General Instrument, producers of the Sega Channel, which stipulated that the XBAND modem would henceforth be built into new Sega Channel adapters, and that the top 5 to 10 games offered by Sega Channel each month would be playable over XBAND.

Initially, Catapult Entertainment had a limited staff and virtually no advertising. By January 1997, XBAND network playability had reached practically every metropolitan area and several rural areas in the U.S. The actual XBAND modems were carried by a few software and video rental chains across the United States. Internationally, the XBAND had some limited growth in the Japanese market, and Catapult was working on PC and Sega Saturn support, though it merged with Mpath Interactive. The focus shifted to the online PC gaming service Mplayer.com which was taken offline and integrated into GameSpy Arcade in 2001, after being acquired by GameSpy in December 2000.

== Service ==
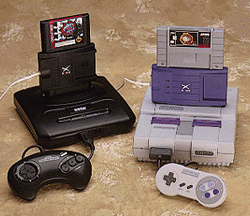
XBAND for the Sega Genesis and the Super NES

The concept of playing online was fairly new at the time. Arcades were still quite popular, and online gaming was not yet a household idea.

The XBAND modem was widely available at Blockbuster Video for US$19.99 (equivalent to $40 in 2025), with additional charges based on usage. Two pricing plans were available. One had a monthly fee of $4.95 and allowed the user to connect to the service up to 50 times a month with each additional connection costing 15 cents. The other had a monthly fee of $9.95 with unlimited connections. Activities that consumed a player's monthly allowance of connections included dialing into the XBAND service for matchmaking, downloading mail (called "XMAIL"), and downloading the daily edition of the two XBAND newsletters, one containing generic news and the other containing platform-specific information such as leaderboards and contest announcements. Players were assessed a fee of $3.95/hour for connecting to opponents outside their local calling area; player-to-player connections inside their local calling area were free.

The modem features built-in storage for up to four user codenames. It stores user friend lists, which can contain the codenames of up to ten of the user's friends; the users' XMAIL boxes, storing up to ten incoming and ten outgoing messages for each user; the users' rankings, win–loss records, and accumulated scores; a short profile section; and the user's avatar (chosen from 40 preset avatars). Text entry is done either through an on-screen keyboard or an optional XBAND keyboard add-on ($29.95 MSRP) released later in the network's lifespan.

The client-side system worked by manipulating the game's memory in a way similar to Game Genie or third-party computer game modifications do.

The XBand operating system was designed to ensure that connections are not lost due to phone activity; in the case of call waiting, the system would alert the user to the call and allow the game to be resumed.

XBAND had an official website to check other players' statistics, along with other information and updates that were not viewable on consoles.

At its height, XBAND had 15,000 subscribers.

== Gaming ==
A 1995 article in Next Generation stated that the XBAND modem's "ultra-low latency is the key to its successful handling of realtime videogaming". The modem's data transfer rate is 2,400 bits per second, which, though low compared to PC modems of the time, was sufficient to handle the simple one-on-one games for XBAND.

When connecting to play, unless specifying a particular user from the friend list, players were matched with a random player elsewhere in the country (or the player's local area code depending on preference) who was also connecting to play the same game. The server would attempt to match players of like skill levels, using the Elo rating system. When the network matched two players up, the newly-connected player's XBAND modem would disconnect from the server and dial the other player, whose own XBAND modem would answer. At that point, the players saw the XBAND logo slide together, followed by the matchup screen, which displayed each player's codenames, avatars, locations, and a pre-typed "taunt".

In December 1995, XBAND launched its first national tournament. This was the first modem to modem tournament ever to be held over a console. The grand prize winner received a special Genghis Khan icon for their XBAND profile and a $200 cash prize from Catapult. Peter Kappes aka "SphiNX" of Orlando, Florida became the first person in history to win a modem to modem national tournament over a console.

== Icon hacking ==
During the last few months of service, several users discovered a way to use a Game Genie to hack the icons of XBAND players. This enabled players to use icons that were otherwise restricted, such as unreleased icons or icons reserved for matches between XBAND team members. Icon hacking resulted in complaints from other users. Rumors about XBAND icon hackers often claimed they were part of elite hacking organizations or members of Catapult Entertainment. Eventually, the method used by the hackers was leaked and inevitably spread throughout the community.

== Demise ==
By March 16, 1997, people could only play within their local area code. On April 30, 1997, the entire network was discontinued, with Mpath citing a lack of new games for the Genesis and Super NES.

XBAND had announced in its previous monthly newsletter that it was shutting down. According to Next Generation, XBAND "never turned a significant profit". During XBAND's existence, only a handful of advertisements were ever made, and only one game, Weaponlord, has the XBAND logo on its box. XBAND stated in its newsletter that players were their best form of advertising, and offered the "XBAND 6 pack", where members could order six modems at a discounted rate and receive a month of free gaming in exchange for signing up a certain number of people to the service.

Heavy contributors to XBAND's demise were the lack of support from game developers and limited internal resources. With the exception of Weaponlord and Doom, Catapult had to individually reverse engineer each game's code, then develop a hack to intercept two-player activity so the game could be shared over a low-latency (fast response time), 2,400-bit/s modem connection.

Catapult's second generation attempts were blocked by Conexant due to the increasing use of the Internet, an effect from the shift to the Information Age. The XBAND was launched in Japan on April 1, 1996 for the Sega Saturn. Unlike the SNES/Super Famicom and Genesis versions of XBAND, it did not require an XBAND-specific modem, instead utilizing Sega's own Sega NetLink device (which included a 14,400 bit/s modem in Japan and a 28,800 bit/s modem in North America). Neither the Saturn XBAND nor an expansion into the PC market succeeded, because developers frequently opted to include their own network linking rather than deal with Catapult's subscription-based service.

== Service issues ==
A major issue for the XBAND service was free long-distance phone calls. It was discovered that a user could record the tones sent from an XBAND modem and then receive the long-distance service number, the authentication code, and phone number of the player you were connecting to. This information allowed anyone to access long-distance phone calls that were charged to Catapult.

Paging company SkyTel faced similar problems from both XBAND users and their own customers. XBAND users performed brute-force attacks against SkyTel's mobile paging system in order to discover voicemail boxes using the same number as the login and password, using these to extend their communication with each other. Most messages consisted simply of shout-outs with music playing in the background.

A common complaint was that if a player was losing a match, they could simply pull their phone cord out or reset their system. This tactic, known as "cord-pulling" among XBAND users, prevented the XBAND service from crediting either player with the win or loss. In response to complaints, the company developed a program which would detect such forced disconnections and assign a loss to the perpetrator and a win to the victim. However, this led to a flood of calls from users claiming that their reset button had been pushed by accident and demanding that the loss be erased from their record; facing unsustainable customer service costs, Catapult changed the program so that while victims of cord-pulling were awarded a win, perpetrators were no longer penalized in any way.

== Publishing statistics ==
Though lacking market success, the XBAND team did manage some publicity gains when they joined forces with a number of gaming magazines, starting on the web with Game Zero magazine and later in Tips & Tricks Magazine. Daily stats were accessible via XBAND News on the modem, although they were not visible to the general public. Publishing stats added a "cool" factor to brag about in the early forefront of online gaming. The top-ranked gamers of the previous month were published starting in January 1996 in Game Zero and, starting in early 1996, in Tips & Tricks magazine.

== Supported games ==
The following games have been analyzed, and online compatibility provided, by XBAND. A hidden maze game can be unlocked in the SNES version by inserting a The Legend of Zelda: A Link to the Past cartridge.

Genesis

- Madden NFL '95
- Madden NFL '96
- Mortal Kombat
- Mortal Kombat II
- Mortal Kombat 3
- NBA Jam
- NBA Live 95
- NBA Live 96
- NHL '94
- NHL '95
- NHL '96
- Primal Rage
- Super Street Fighter II
- Weaponlord

SNES

- Doom
- Ken Griffey, Jr. Presents Major League Baseball
- Killer Instinct
- Kirby's Avalanche
- Madden NFL '95
- Madden NFL '96
- Mortal Kombat II
- Mortal Kombat 3
- NBA Jam Tournament Edition
- NHL '95
- NHL '96
- Othello World (Japan only)
- Panel de Pon (Japan only)
- Puyo Puyo 2 Remix (Japan only)
- Super Famista 5 (Japan only)
- Super Fire Pro Wrestling X Premium (Japan only)
- Super Mario Kart
- Super Street Fighter II
- Weaponlord

Saturn (Japan XBAND branded releases only)

- Daytona USA Championship Circuit Edition
- Decathlete
- Puyo Puyo Sun
- Puzzle Bobble 3
- Saturn Bomberman
- Sega Rally Championship Plus
- Sega Worldwide Soccer '98
- Shadows of the Tusk
- Virtua Fighter Remix
- Virtual On
- World Series Baseball

PC

- The Ultimate DOOM
- Doom II
- HardBall 5
- Hexen: Beyond Heretic
- Locus
- MechWarrior 2: 31st Century Combat
- Star Control 3
- Super Street Fighter II

== See also ==
- GameLine, a third party dialup service for the Atari 2600
- Family Computer Network System, Nintendo's 1980s online service in Japan
- Intellivision's PlayCable
- Teleplay Modem, a third party modem made for the NES, Super NES, and Genesis
- Sega Genesis's Sega Channel
- Sega Meganet - Sega's own online gaming service for the Mega Drive
- Satellaview - A satellite modem for the Super Famicom with non-interactive online gaming
- Sega NetLink - Sega's Online service for the Sega Saturn
- 64DD Nintendo's 64DD and Randnet online service of 1999-2001 in Japan
- SharkWire Online, a third party dialup service for the Nintendo 64
