= WeaponLord =

1995 video game

- Cover art by Simon Bisley
- Developer: Visual Concepts
- Publishers: Super NES: NA: Namco Hometek; PAL: Ocean Software; Genesis: NA: Namco Hometek
- Producer: James Goddard
- Designers: James Goddard; David Winstead; Steven Chiang
- Programmers: Super NES; Steven Chiang; Genesis; Aki Rimpiläinen
- Artist: Alvin Cardona
- Composer: Brian L. Schmidt
- Platforms: Super NES, Sega Genesis
- Release: Super NES: NA: September 1995; PAL: 1995; Genesis: NA: September 1995
- Genre: Fighting
- Modes: Single-player, multiplayer

WeaponLord is a 1995 fighting game developed by Visual Concepts and published by Namco for the Super Nintendo Entertainment System and Sega Genesis. The game has players select a character and defeat a series of opponents. The game is a weapons-based fighter, with various gory moves and a deep counterattack system.

Project leads James Goddard and Dave Winstead aimed to design a title for enthusiasts of the fighting game genre. Unlike many other fighting games of the time, WeaponLord was designed specifically for home consoles and was one of the first fighting games optimized for online play. It has also been thought of as the basis for Namco's Soul Edge/Calibur series.

The game received mixed reviews upon release, with criticism going towards its graphics and animation, while the gameplay was esteemed for its innovation and depth. Many critics remarked that the complexity of the gameplay would make the game too daunting for all but experienced fighting game enthusiasts.

== Gameplay ==
At its core, WeaponLord is a standard 2D fighting game. Where it differs is in its gameplay mechanics, and in some of its aesthetic choices and presentation. The game features thrust-blocking, an aggressive blocking system similar to Street Fighter III's Parry system. Also introduced in the game are Deflect moves, a counterattack maneuver that each character has. Certain special moves, known as "Take Downs", knock opponents onto their back. A player can then follow up with additional attacks while their foe is still on the floor.

In addition, when certain attacks are performed on an opponent in mid-swing, the player can cut off a piece of their clothing or their hair. Players can finish off matches using "Death Combos", Fatality-style combination attacks that can have a gory effect on opponents.

WeaponLord's fighters possess between 9 and 12 special moves each. Moves can be executed one of several ways: sweeping motions on the directional pad followed by an attack button, "charge" moves where a directional button is held for 2 seconds quickly followed by the opposite direction, and finally an attack button, or hold down moves where the player must first hold down an attack button, followed by a directional motion, and finish it by releasing said attack button.

A password is given at the end of a match, so the player can always return to the middle of a game, if need be. A secret password is also given so the Demonlord Zarak is playable in Story Mode. Characters have different ending sequences depending on which opponents were spared, or killed with a Death Combo during the Story Mode.

== Story ==
On a battlefield a demon spirit enters the body of a dying mercenary. He is reborn and defeats twenty rulers in bloody combat. He goes on to found the reign of the Demonlord Raith. At the height of his power, his doom is foretold by a shaman: "When the night turns violent and the moon bleeds, gripped by the skeletal fingers of death...a child will rise to face the demon in combat...and the lord of demons will fall by the hand of...the WeaponLord."

Against the advice of his lieutenants to kill the children born that night, the Demonlord waits to face his foretold killer in fair, one-on-one combat. Years later the Demon Zarak overthrows Raith and becomes the new Demonlord. Twenty-five years after the prophecy was made, Zarak holds a great tournament of champion warriors. The winner will face the demon in a final battle. The Demonlord prepares to meet his destiny head on and to destroy the Weaponlord.

== Development ==
The game's lead designers James Goddard and Dave Winstead had previously worked for Capcom. Goddard was co-designer and U.S. producer of Street Fighter II: Champion Edition and Street Fighter II: Hyper Fighting and designed the character Dee Jay for Super Street Fighter II, and Winstead had worked on Super Street Fighter II Turbo. Both had extensive fighting game tournament experience and wanted to cater to dedicated fans of the genre with WeaponLord. They also wanted to optimize the game for the slow dial-up connections of the XBAND service, timing parry animations and character turnaround time to account for lag. To achieve the creative control they needed to create such a game, they left Capcom to join Namco. There they took over a project led by Ken Lobb codenamed "Melee", a four-player brawler, and redirected it into the one-on-one fighter they had in mind.

The decision to make the game weapons-based stemmed from Goddard's fascination with Conan the Barbarian. The characters and their fighting poses were sketched by Alvin Cardona.

Visual Concepts had an incredibly tight schedule to complete the game, and the decision to add a Genesis version came later into the development cycle than most other multi-platform titles. Steve Chiang, the game's co-designer and chief programmer of the SNES version, wrote an in-house tool called "Hero" which the team used to hand-tune the collision frame by frame. Comic book artist Simon Bisley provided the cover art and the game's logo; the game was the only title to display the XBAND logo on its box. The development team worked closely with XBAND representatives to ensure that the game would not suffer from lag when being played online.

Due to the large size of the character sprites, the team could not include more than seven characters without exceeding space limitations. To compensate for the relatively small character selection, they gave each character an unusually large number of moves. The character sprites were hand drawn pixel-by-pixel on a computer, a common graphics technique which was at the time becoming overshadowed by newer techniques such as polygonal modeling and digitized sprites. The backgrounds were painted by a freelance artist, then scanned into a computer and retouched in Adobe Photoshop.

Zarak was the only character in the game to feature his own signature fatality, although rumors persist that other characters have unique finishing moves as well. It was originally intended for all of the characters to have a unique death combo but due to the apparent rush to finish the game, only Zarak's was completed.

During playtesting, Visual Concepts sent a new version of the game to Namco's testing department at least three times a week. Following the traditional playtest, Goddard and Winstead arranged to have Weaponlord installed in an arcade cabinet in the Golfland in Sunnyvale, California in order to get direct player reactions.

== Reception ==
Reception

Review scores
Publication	Score	
Publication	Sega Genesis	SNES
AllGame	4.5/5	4.5/5
Computer and Video Games	87/100	86/100
Electronic Gaming Monthly	6.5/10, 4/10, 5/10, 7/10	N/A
EP Daily	N/A	8.5/10
Game Informer	8.5/10	8.5/10
Game Players	70%	N/A
GameFan	N/A	93/100, 95/100, 92/100
GamesMaster	N/A	78%
Hyper	82/100	82/100
Mean Machines Sega	84/100	N/A
Next Generation	4/5	4/5
Official Nintendo Magazine	N/A	92/100
Super Play	N/A	75%
Total!	N/A	(UK) 73/100 (DE) 2
Nintendo Magazine System	N/A	90/100
Sega Magazine	87/100	N/A
Sega Power	88%	N/A
Super Gamer	N/A	91/100
VideoGames	8/10	8/10

WeaponLord was not a large commercial success. James Goddard attributed this partly to it being released at the tail end of the 16-bit console era.

Reviewing the Genesis version, the four reviewers of Electronic Gaming Monthly were divided. Two of them panned the game for the choppy animation and poor control, with one concluding that "The concepts are there, but the game isn't." The other two also heavily criticized the animation and control, but argued that some gamers would feel that the innovative fighting techniques make the game worthwhile in spite of its flaws. A critic for Next Generation also criticized the choppy animation but greatly praised the innovative and deep weapons combat. He concluded the game to be "worthy of at least a good long look".

'GamePro complimented the graphics, sound effects, and variety of moves. They criticized the limited number of playable characters, but concluded that "While the advanced gameplay may scare away beginning barbarians, others will appreciate the deep controls". A different GamePro reviewer made similar remarks of the Super NES version, commenting that the combat system effectively did away with cheap techniques such as corner traps and simple throws, but could be daunting for many players. A Next Generation reviewer remarked that the Super NES version looks better than the Genesis version but suffers from the same choppy animation. Their review again emphasized the depth and innovation of the weapons-based combat.

In a retrospective review of the Super NES version, AllGame offered praise for the deep countering system, but said that the complexity of the game may turn off newcomers. Reviewer Scott Alan Marriott said it was not easy to pick up and play like Mortal Kombat, being "designed for the hardcore fan rather than those new to the genre", and mentioned that the game's computer opponents were far too difficult for novices. Marriott also wrote that the game's detailed character design was distracting and that the animations were choppy, as well as faulting the game for having fewer playable characters than the Street Fighter II series. Despite these flaws, he recommended it as "a must-have title for the fighting game enthusiast".
