= Video game accessory =

Hardware required to use a video game console or to enrich a game's play experience

A video game accessory is a distinct piece of hardware that is required to use a video game console, or one that enriches the video game's play experience. Essentially, video game accessories are everything except the console itself, such as controllers, memory, power adapters (AC), and audio/visual cables. Most video game consoles come with the accessories required to play games out of the box (minus software): one A/V cable, one AC cable, and a controller. While early consoles relied on external memory cards, modern systems typically feature internal storage (HDDs or SSDs), often requiring external hard drives or expansion cards for additional space outside of these. Historically, external memory was required because game data could not be saved to read-only media like compact discs. The companies that manufacture video game consoles also make these accessories for replacement purposes (AC cords and A/V cables) as well as improving the overall experience (extra controllers for more players, or unique devices like light guns and dance pads). There is an entire industry of companies that create accessories for consoles as well, called third-party companies. The prices are often lower than those made by the maker of the console (first-party). This is usually achieved by avoiding licensing or using cheaper materials. For the mobile systems like the PlayStation Portable and Game Boy iterations, there are many accessories to make them more usable in mobile environments, such as mobile chargers, lighting to improve visibility, and cases to both protect and help organize the collection of system peripherals to. Newer accessories include many home-made things like mod chips to bypass manufacturing protection or homemade software.

== Accessory types ==
=== Game controllers ===
The most common accessory for video game consoles are the controllers used to play the games. The controllers have evolved since the day of Pong and the spinner. Now there are direction controls as well as many types of other inputs.

One type of directional control is the directional pad or D-Pad. The D-Pad is designed to look like an addition sign with each branch being one of the four cardinal directions; left, right, up, and down. It has been around since the original Nintendo Entertainment System, and has been in every Nintendo system since. Another feature in the recent console controllers are the analog sticks, used for 360ْ directional control. Often used for camera angle control, the idea is to give the player full control by allowing any direction to be used. The analog controls made their first appearance in the 1970s consoles under the name joystick; they made a reappearance in console systems with the Nintendo 64. Analog sticks have been used in every modern console since. There is no analog stick on the Wii Remote, but it is present on the Nunchuk attachment bundled with the Wii console. The most recent development in directional controls is free motion control. Using accelerometers in the Wii Remote and Nunchuk, acceleration in any direction can be detected and measured. This is still a new type of control scheme and is fully taken advantage of in the Wii as well as the PlayStation 3's SIXAXIS controller, and PlayStation Move controller that has tilt detection.

While directional controls are one important part of controllers there are also general inputs, usually in the form of buttons either on the front or on the tope edges (shoulders) of the controller. These buttons are simply designed usually labeled either by some color, shape, or letter identification. The buttons can be used for simplistic one action ideas like jumping or performing some kind of generic mêlée attack, but they can also be used to string together combinations of maneuvers like a martial artist's attacks. In systems beginning with the Super Nintendo, buttons on the shoulders of the controller have become commonplace. In the case of the Xbox series of systems (and Sega Dreamcast), the shoulder buttons are shaped and used more like a gun trigger.

=== Memory units ===
Originally console games had no additional storage memory for saving game related data. During the Nintendo Entertainment System's time on the market, battery backed cartridge games that could retain a limited number of game files were introduced. When the original PlayStation was released it included support for an external memory source, called a memory card. Its purpose was to store important information about the games, such as game states or scoring info. That memory card used a memory of type EEPROM. To support the growing use of these cards in normal game play and the different amounts of data to be saved, larger memory cards were created. Other consoles also adopted the use of memory cards, such as the Sega Dreamcast, whose memory card was called the Visual Memory Unit or VMU. The Dreamcast's memory unit was unique in that it had a monochrome LCD, a D-pad, and two buttons. A large third party memory card market also sprung up, offering cards that were often much cheaper and larger than the official released memory cards. Some unique third party cards required extra software to access the cards, or possibly increase the data capacity by compressing the contained data.

The Xbox system was sold with a new type of data storage for consoles: an internal hard drive to store information. The hard drive was 8 GB and was used as more than just a memory device. It was used in conjunction with the games to buffer some of the game data so that loading times were decreased. The hard drive also stored downloadable content from the Xbox Live service. Since the Xbox precedent, the PlayStation 2 had a hard drive accessory used with the Final Fantasy XI game to store character data. In the new generation of game consoles the PlayStation 3 is included with one of many different sized hard drives, depending on which model of the console is purchased, the 20 GB, 40 GB, 60 GB, and 80 GB models, or 120 or 250 GB for the PS3 Slim. The Xbox 360 launched with a 20 GB hard drive. After users started to complain of lack of space due to HD content, Microsoft released a 120 GB drive bundled with their Elite model, and available for individual sale.

=== Audio/Video cables ===
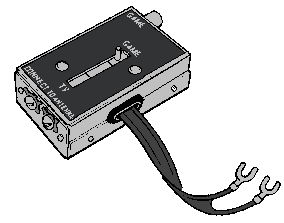
Early style antenna switch box

Console systems are played on a television. As such the systems need a way for the information they process to show up on the screen, and for the audio to be played through a sound system. Originally this was done through an antenna switch box. Later this was changed to a coaxial cable setup called a RF connector. It transmitted both the audio and video through one cable. Modern day systems are quite different though. All of the newer systems use industry standards now. One of those standards is RCA composite cables of single video and left and right audio. The video connector is usually colored yellow while the left and right audios are colored white and red respectively. Now that the newer systems are focusing on HD content and displaying in HD newer types of cable connections are needed. The basic are component cables with the RGB format. RGB stands for the three colors, red, green, and blue. This is the simplest form of HD cables. It uses three cables for video and the two for audio still. The newest form of HD transmittance cables are the High-Definition Multimedia Interface or HDMI cables. The HDMI cables transmit both the video and audio signals over a single cable. More importantly the information transmitted is a digital signal. Other cables utilize analog signals so that modern systems must convert to analog and then back to digital for use. Information is often lost in these conversions so that HDMI keeps the signal as digital so that less information is lost, keeping the signal truer to its source. These cables and signals are too new to be fully utilized, and are really only necessary for 1080p signal.

=== Cases ===
Due to the modern video gaming market, an abundance of cases are available for both home and hand held game systems. Because portables often come in contact with the elements and are more prone to accidents, most owners use a case to protect their systems.

Many such cases include soft padding to cradle the system while an outside shell provides protection from falls or environmental debris. Some trade off padding to make a thinner, more compact case. While the larger such cases usually provide better protection and more room for games and accessories, they can be rather bulky and difficult to carry in pockets or small bags.

To a lesser degree, cases for home consoles also exist. Home console cases are usually designed as a backpack or briefcase and have enough room for the system, cables, controllers, and often, a few games. This allows gamers to easily transport traditionally stationary systems, making them more mobile and sharable.

Home console video games come packaged inside of a DVD-style case. Portables use a smaller format, but both are usually larger than the actual game media. Therefore, one may find cases made to hold only the game media, thus saving space and protecting the disks or cartridges from the open environment or improper storage. They can hold one or several games. Larger cases and folders can hold a gamer's entire collection.

=== Software accessories ===
Most software accessories for a video game system are simply the games designed by professional game companies. With some of the recent systems, homemade games called homebrew are being designed and released publicly. The Xbox 360 system has official released tools called the XNA so that users can design and proliferate their own content. It was announce by Microsoft after their announcement of the Xbox Live Marketplace. Another type of homebrew is popular on the Nintendo DS portable gaming system. Through an outside hardware device, the internal software that is used to run games, the BIOS, is overwritten. Replacing the default BIOS with an unofficial BIOS allows for user generated content to be playable. These games are anything from simple ports of older games to truly new ideas and games. Sony also allowed for homebrew content on their new PlayStation 3 by allowing for Linux to be installed. Linux allows for many different types of content to be playable. Because of Linux's open source methods of utilizing the hardware as long as users write the necessary software, anything can be playable on the PS3.

There is more than just software that allows different software to be playable. Hardware called modchips allow for many different changes to the system. Because the chips require that you open the case to the system and attach them to the circuits, the chips void any warranty and are even considered illegal by some companies. Most modchips are designed to allow illegal copies of games to be played. They can also allow for access to hardware not normally contained in the system. Overall modchips can add interesting effects but can cause many complications from the possibility of breaking the system, from improper installation, and causing legal problems.

== Peripherals ==
Peripherals, also known as add-ons, are devices generally sold separately from the console, but which connect to the main unit to add significant new functionality. This includes devices that upgrade the hardware of a console to allow it to play more resource-intensive games, devices that allow consoles to play games on a different media format, as well as devices which fully change the function of a console from a game-playing device to something else. A hardware peripheral differs from an accessory in that an accessory either adds functionality that is beneficial but nonessential for game play (like a Game Link Cable or Rumble Pak), or in some cases may only add aesthetic value (like a case mod or faceplate). Generally, a game designed for use with an accessory can still be played on a console without the compatible accessory, whereas a game designed for use with a peripheral cannot be played on a console without the appropriate peripheral.

=== Peripherals by Brand and System ===
Atari

Jaguar

- Jaguar CD

Mattel Electronics

Intellivision

- Intellivoice
- Entertainment Computer System

Sega

Genesis (Mega Drive)

- 32X
- Sega CD/Mega-CD
- Sega Channel adapter

TurboGrafx-16

- TurboExpress
- PC Engine LT
- PC Engine Shuttle
- TurboTap
- TurboGrafx-CD/CD-ROM²
  - Super CD-ROM²
  - Arcade CD-ROM² (JP only)

Microsoft

Xbox 360 & Xbox One

- Kinect
  - Kinect Fun Labs
- Xbox 360 HD DVD Player

Nintendo

Nintendo Entertainment System

- Aladdin Deck Enhancer
- Famicom 3D System (Japan)
- Famicom Data Recorder (Japan)
- Family Computer Network System (Japan)
- Family Computer Disk System (Japan, Hong Kong)

Super Famicom/Super NES

- Satellaview (Japan)
- Sufami Turbo (Japan)
- Super Game Boy
- Super Game Boy 2
- SNES-CD (Cancelled)

Nintendo 64

- Expansion Pak
- Nintendo 64DD (Japan)
- Wide-Boy64

GameCube

- Game Boy Player

Game Boy

- Game Boy Camera

Game Boy Color

- Singer IZEK sewing machine

Game Boy Advance

- e-Reader
- Game Eye (Canceled)
- Play-Yan

Sony Interactive Entertainment

PlayStation 2

- EyeToy

PlayStation 4

- PlayStation VR

PlayStation 5

- PlayStation VR2
- PlayStation Portal

== Third-party versus first-party ==
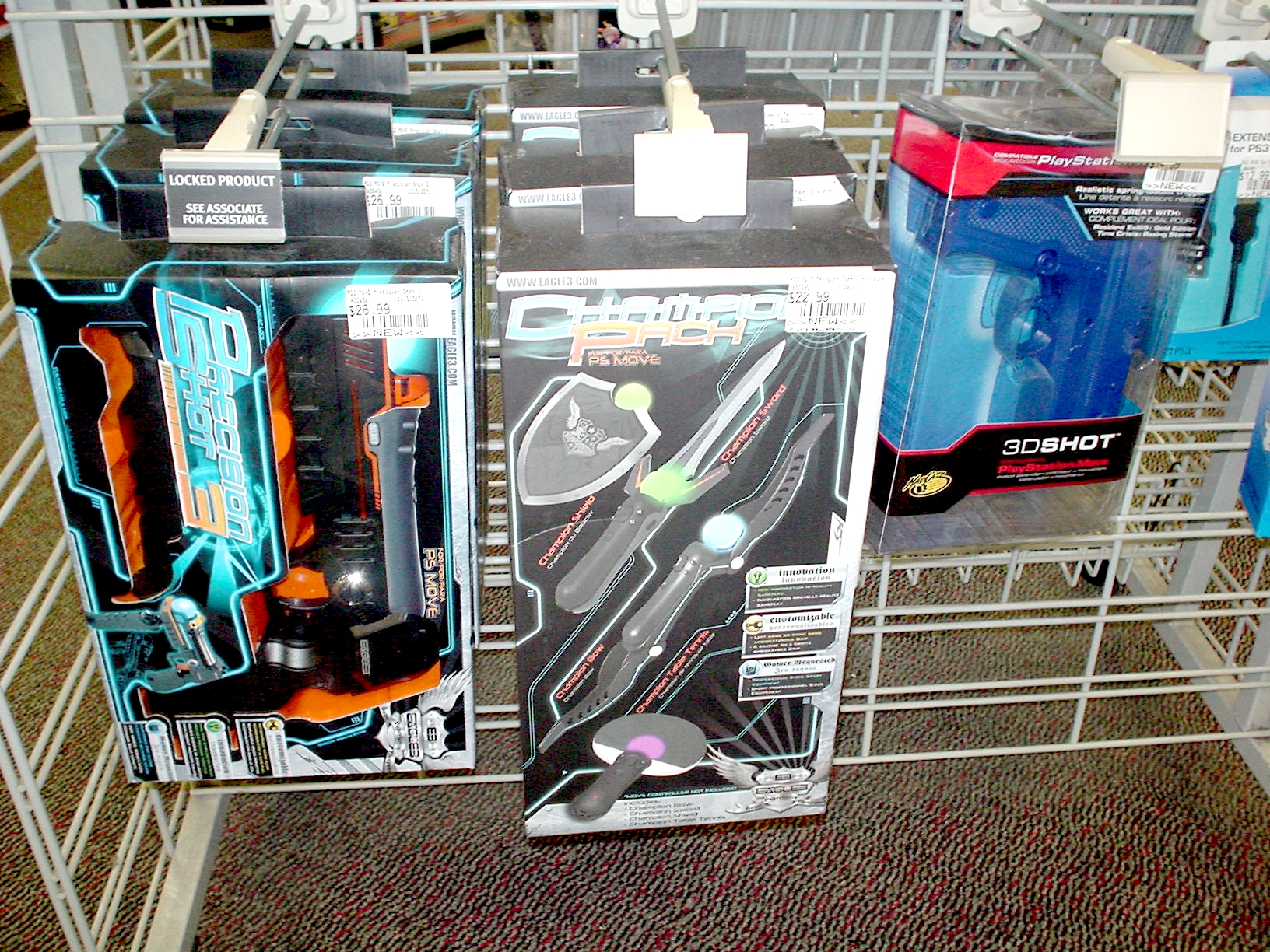
Third-party accessories sold in GameStop stores

Game accessories can be one of two types, first- or third-party. First-party accessories are often very expensive for what they are. Because of this, many companies specialize in the production of similar products that perform the same functions. Most of these items are similar but cheaper. They come at lower costs for many reasons. Because these companies can avoid licensing fees, and did not have the same development costs, they can save money that way. They also may use lower quality materials in the production of the accessories, making them cheaper but usually more fragile and less trustworthy. Another common trait with third-party accessories is a better value. While most first-party accessories only have one version, only one kind of controller for example, many third-party companies will expand upon the original product. As an example, Sony was not the first to release a memory card of twice the original's capacity. Instead, many of the third-party companies were able to release such a product first and get many sales from them.

== Trends in accessories ==
One of the major trends is making everything wireless. Most systems have cables plugged in the front and back. While there are not many cables plugged into the system, if the system is close to the television system and audio system, then the cables might be quite extensive and very haphazardly arranged. By making most of the accessories wireless the goal is to cut down on the clutter. One of the problems with wireless accessories is power. There is currently no wireless power source for the accessory. So in most cases batteries of some fashion are required. A problem with this can be the power requirements of the regular function of the accessory as well as the components used to maintain the wireless connection. Often the power draw on these batteries can be too much for it to be cost effective to power these devices without rechargeable batteries. A solution to this is a rechargeable controller station.

Another trend that has developed is that of a controller unique to a specific game. An example of such being the guitar controller for Red Octane's Guitar Hero game. These controllers are unusual because they can only be used for one game. The default game controllers are usable for many types of games, so a controller that is only usable for one seems to be counter intuitive. However, with games as popular as Guitar Hero sometimes the controller can even inspire third party replicas. Toys-to-Life games not only provide physical toys for the player, but these toys also function as part of the in-game experience through either near field communication or some sort of image recognition.

One problem partly enhanced by the uptake of wireless technology is that the user is still forced to stand up and leave their seat in order to control certain aspects of the game system. In order to alleviate that issue many recent consoles include features that allow powering on, off, and resetting the machine remotely.
