= Fatal Labyrinth =

1990 video game

- European cover art
- Developer: Sega
- Publisher: Sega
- Designer: Hirokazu Yasuhara
- Artist: Naoto Ohshima
- Platform: Genesis
- Release: JP: November 21, 1990; WW: 1991
- Genres: Roguelike, role-playing
- Mode: Single-player

Fatal Labyrinth, titled Shi no Meikyuu: Labyrinth of Death (死の迷宮) in Japan, is a 1990 roguelike role-playing video game developed and published by Sega for the Sega Genesis. Originally available on the Sega Meganet multiplayer gaming service in Japan, it was later released physically in 1991. The game is similar to and shares assets with Dragon Crystal, which was released around that time.

The game appears in Sonic's Ultimate Genesis Collection for Xbox 360 and PlayStation 3, and was later included in Sega Genesis Classics for PlayStation 4, Xbox One, and Nintendo Switch.

== Gameplay ==
The player controls an undistinguished hero who has agreed to enter a forbidden labyrinth, battle various monsters, and make their way up to the 30th floor where an evil dragon guards a stolen Holy Goblet. The hero can walk around town and talk to villagers for advice before entering the labyrinth. Upon defeating the dragon and reclaiming the Goblet, the player flies back to the village to speak to the inhabitants, who offer praise and congratulations for the hero's efforts.

The hero engaged in combat

On each level of the labyrinth, weapons, armor, magic rings, and other items are discovered, which can be equipped or thrown. Melee weapons include axes, swords and polearms (although the length of the weapon determines its attributes). Short weapons (axes, short swords) are stronger, but less accurate while longer weapons (broadswords, polearms) usually hit for less damage, but are more accurate. Bows and shurikens are included for projectile combat. Body armor, helmets and shields can also be found. The effects of magic rings vary from powering-up the hero to using them as magical throwing projectiles.

Fatal Labyrinth also has a variety of other items, including scrolls, canes and potions. A key part of the game revolves around identifying which of these items benefit the character and which ones have curses. Throwing these items can sometimes cause projectile damage. After defeating monsters, the hero levels-up and gains health points, increased attack power and receives a better title.

Enemies only move and attack in response to the player's actions. For example, if the player takes a step, the enemies also take a step. Checkpoints exist on every fifth floor. Upon dying, the player is returned to those floors if they were reached. If the hero wanders around a level for too long, the screen will flash and the monsters will respawn. Some floors have pits in which the character falls down one level and must fight the monsters on that level again. The hero may also step on an alarm and can become trapped by monsters. The hero will sometimes respawn in a room with no visible doors, and may need to search for a hidden exit.

Food is a vital part of the game. When fed, the hero slowly regenerates health. If unfed for an extended amount of time, the hero becomes hungry and loses health. Conversely, if too much food is eaten, the character dies of over-eating. Some items can help or hinder the digestion of the hero.

Like many role-playing games, gold is present, though the only purpose it serves is to provide the player with a better funeral service upon death. The more gold collected in the game, the more detailed the hero's grave. More people will attend the hero's funeral based on their level when killed.

== Release ==
Fatal Labyrinth appeared in Sega Genesis Classics for Microsoft Windows, PlayStation 4, Xbox One, and Nintendo Switch.

== Reception ==
Ars Technica stated that Fatal Labyrinth was "the earliest Japanese-made roguelike of note" and said its gameplay was very similar to Rogue. Hardcore Gaming 101 gave a positive review, saying "the appeal of [Fatal Labyrinth] is found in that “just one more” feeling of attempting to top a previous best, to go down further than before and eke out another floor or two." Destructoid said the game is very challenging, but was fun to beat, and noted that the checkpoint system sets it apart from other roguelikes.
