= Tel-Tel Mahjong =

1990 video game

- Cover art
- Developer: Sunsoft
- Publisher: Sunsoft
- Series: Tel-Tel
- Platform: Sega Mega Drive
- Release: JP: June 8, 1990
- Genre: Strategy
- Modes: Single-player, multiplayer

Tel-Tel Mahjong (ＴＥＬ・ＴＥＬまあじゃん) is a Sega Mega Drive Mahjong video game that was released exclusively in Japan in 1990. Part of the Tel-Tel series that included Tel-Tel Stadium, it was one of the few games that used the Mega Modem, allowing for two-player games via the Sega Net Work System. Up to three players could play the "host" player in addition to play against computer opponents.
