= Dragon Crystal =

1990 video game

- Master System cover art
- Developer: Sega
- Publisher: Sega
- Platforms: Game Gear, Master System
- Release: Game Gear: JP: December 22, 1990; NA: 1991; EU: 1991; Master System: EU: November 21, 1991
- Genres: RPG, Roguelike
- Mode: Single-player

Dragon Crystal (ドラゴンクリスタル) is a 1990 role-playing video game developed and published by Sega for the Game Gear and Master System. The game is similar to and shares assets with Fatal Labyrinth, which was also released around that time.

== Plot ==
As the player rides a bicycle one late afternoon, he turns down an alley never before noticed and enters an antique shop. There, a mysterious glowing crystal is sitting on a shelf. Upon approaching the crystal and gazing into it, a powerful force pulls the player in, causing a blackout.

The player awakens in a forest with a large egg following behind. This forest is a huge maze, crawling with dangerous creatures. The player finds weapons and other items scattered around with which to fight the monsters. The only way out is to continue onward while defeating monsters and growing in power.

== Gameplay ==
The player starts off in the middle of a maze level covered by fog. The first ten levels are a mix of trees, cacti, sunflowers, and Easter Island style statues. Progress is achieved by completing each floor and warping to the next by moving the character to a differently colored square, found by clearing the level.

Weapons, armor, potions, rings, food, money and enemies are randomly placed on the ground. If a player walks around for too long without picking up food, he will die of starvation. Cake objects give 11 to 27 and meat objects 42 to 46 food points. The maximum number of food points is 99 and each food point allows the character to move six spaces on the screen.

The player has a number of Hit Points dependent on the level achieved, these increase by killing monsters and advancing to the next character level. Hit points are traded in battle with the enemy and recovered by moving around. Money is used to revive from death, increasing in cost with the number and severity of previous deaths.

The game is essentially turn-based, with each movement or action the equivalent to one turn and both monsters and the player will take it in turn to make an attack. This means getting surrounded can be particularly dangerous as every enemy would get one attack for every one attack the player makes. Likewise, a player who wanted to take their time in thinking about what to do next in a battle could do so without being attacked by just standing still.

Items picked up in the game, with the exception of armor and weapons, are color-coded, with colors representing an effect that cannot be discovered until the player does one of the following: uses an item of that color, or throws it on an enemy. Once, say, a Bronze Book has been used, all future Bronze Books will be renamed to reflect its powers. Generally speaking, Pots are potions that can heal or poison the player, Books provide either maps or spells that may strengthen the player in some way or negate a harmful effect (such as removing cursed items), Rods cast spells that affect enemies and Rings provide bonuses to stats (or sometimes are cursed, such as the Hunger Ring, which makes the player consume food much more quickly and requires a Bless Book to remove). Unwanted items, such as armor or weapons weaker than the ones already worn by the player or cursed or poisonous items, can either be dropped or thrown at enemies for minor damage. The player may only carry a limited number of items.

As the player equips better items, their in-game appearance changes to reflect the new gear if it's sufficiently different. Robe, Cuirass, and Leathers all have the same basic appearance, while Chainmail gives the player a new look.

As the player gains levels, the egg accompanying the player hatches into a dragon that grows with the player as he moves through the levels.

Each enemy has a unique attack. Toads can poison the player, Fire Diamonds cause dizziness (which has the effect of randomizing the direction the player moves), Ninjas teleport around the map, some Slime Blobs create copies of themselves and so on. The game ends when the player finds and picks up the holy goblet hidden in level 30, or runs out of hit points. If the player has collected sufficient gold throughout their playthrough, they may continue the game, but will lose all unequipped items they had before they continued.

== Sequels and ports ==
Dragon Crystal is similar to and shares assets with Fatal Labyrinth, which was released around the same time. A Dragon Crystal II was planned for mobile phones but was never released.

The Game Gear version of the game was released for the Nintendo 3DS Virtual Console worldwide in March 2012.

== Reception ==
The Game Gear version was reviewed in 1991 in Dragon #175 by Hartley, Patricia, and Kirk Lesser in "The Role of Computers" column. The reviewers gave the game 5 out of 5 stars.

Console XS reviewed the Master System version in 1992, giving it an 82% score.

== Sources ==
- Dragon Crystal at MobyGames
- Dragon Crystal II cell phone sequel
