= Sega Meganet =

Online game service for the Mega Drive

- Logo for the Sega Net Work System
- Developer: Sega
- Type: Online service
- Launched: JP: November 3, 1990; BR: 1995
- Platform: Mega Drive
- Status: Discontinued

Sega Meganet, also known as the Net Work System, was an online service for the Mega Drive in Japan and later Brazil. Utilizing dial-up Internet access, Meganet was Sega's first online multiplayer gaming service, and functioned on a pay to play basis. The system functioned through the use of a peripheral called the Mega Modem and offered several unique titles that could be downloaded, and a few could be played competitively with friends. In addition, it shared technology and equipment with more serious services such as the Mega Anser, used for banking purposes. Though the system was announced for North America under the rebranded name "Tele-Genesis", it was never released for that region. Ultimately, the Meganet service would be short-lived, lasting approximately a year before it was discontinued, but would serve as a precursor to the Sega Channel and XBAND services, as well as a predecessor to online gaming services for video game consoles. Retrospective feedback praises the attempt by Sega to introduce online gaming, but criticizes the service for its logistical issues and lack of titles.

== History ==
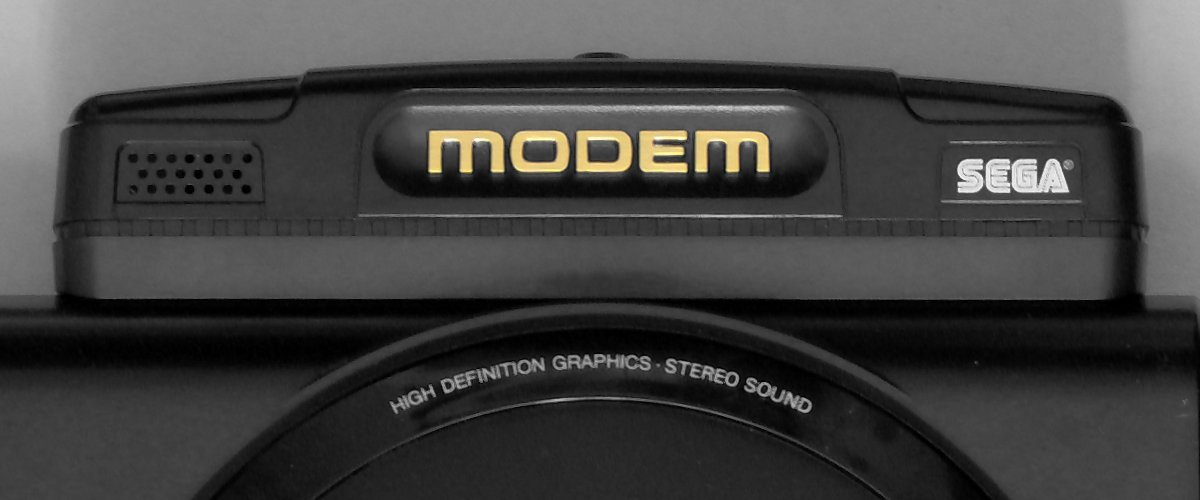
Sega Mega Modem peripheral, which allowed access to the Meganet service

Sega's 16-bit console, the Mega Drive was released in Japan on October 29, 1988, though the launch was overshadowed by Nintendo's release of Super Mario Bros. 3 a week earlier. Positive coverage from magazines Famitsu and Beep! helped to establish a following, but Sega only managed to ship 400,000 units in the first year. In order to draw a larger audience, Sega began work on an Internet service, similar to what Nintendo had attempted with the Family Computer Network System for the Family Computer.

Released in Japan on November 3, 1990, at a cost of JP¥12,800 (approximately US$100) for the equipment, as well as an additional ¥800 monthly, access began to the Meganet service by way of the Mega Modem, a peripheral which attaches to the rear EXT 9-pin port on the rear of the console. From the modem, a cable runs to a dual-port connector, which connects into a telephone line. The Mega Modem also came packaged with a cartridge which allowed for access to the Meganet game library, and approximately six titles were available at launch. It was capable of connection speeds of up to 1200bit/s. The service had also been announced in North America under the name "Tele-Genesis" at the Winter Consumer Electronics Show (Winter CES) in January 1990, and advertised in publications such as Electronic Gaming Monthly, but it was never released for the region.

As another way of attempting to expand the audience for the Mega Drive in Japan, Sega introduced the Mega Anser, a system designed for use with Nagoya Bank in Japan, in 1990. Packaged as an all-in-one system including a Mega Drive, Mega Modem, Mega Anser cartridge and keypad, the system allowed for transactions such as balance inquiries, transfers, and loan information. It initially retailed at a cost of JP¥34,000 including the home console, and a version with an additional printer retailed for ¥72,800.

Due to the system's low number of titles, prohibitively high price, and the Mega Drive's lack of success in Japan, the Meganet system proved to be a commercial failure. By 1992, the Mega Modem peripheral could be found in bargain bins at a reduced price, and a remodeled version of the Mega Drive released in 1993 removed the EXT 9-pin port altogether, preventing the newer model from being connected to the Meganet service.

In 1995, the Meganet internet service launched in Brazil. Its main focus in the region was e-mail, although by 1996 the service was capable of online multiplayer, along with chat features. Similar to the Mega Anser, a home banking product was also released for the region. Meganet hardware and services were provided through Sega's distributor in the region, Tectoy.

== Game library ==
A screenshot from Meganet title Fatal Labyrinth

The Meganet service utilized its own library of titles, independent of the Genesis library. Most of these games never received a cartridge release; however, Columns, Fatal Labyrinth, Flicky, and Teddy Boy Blues each later saw cartridge versions. Several Meganet games would also later appear in the Game no Kanzume series, released for the Mega-CD exclusively in Japan. Most games for the service were small, at around 128KB per game, due to the limits of Internet connection speeds at the time. Downloads were estimated to take about five to eight minutes to complete.

All of the Meganet games were available through the Sega Game Library, accessed through the Meganet modem. Due to issues with long-distance charges through the use of telephone lines, as well as seconds of lag time between commands, only two games featured competitive play: Tel-Tel Stadium and Tel-Tel Mahjong, with the remainder of the games available for single players via download. Due to Sega's reluctance to commit to releasing the service in North America, third-party developers in that region were unwilling to invest in developing games specifically for Meganet. This resulted in a low number of titles created for the service.

The following list contains all of the titles released for the Meganet service. All titles in this list were released in Japan only.

There were 42 games released on the Meganet.

Title	Developer	Publisher	Year
16t	Sega	Sega	1991
Aworg: Hero In The Sky	Sega	Sega	1991
Columns *	Sega	Sega	1991
Flicky *	Sega	Sega	1991
Go Net	Aisystem Tokyo	Sega	1991
Hyper Marbles	Sega	Sega	1991
Ikazuse! Koi no Doki Doki Penguin Land MD	Sega	Sega	1991
Kinetic Connection ① Nei Second	Sega	Sega	1991
Kinetic Connection ② O Hanaba Take	Sega	Sega	1991
Kinetic Connection ③ Shirogane Wa Warau Yo	Sega	Sega	1991
Kinetic Connection ④ Mogura No O Asobi	Sega	Sega	1991
Kinetic Connection ⑤ Lightning Nei	Sega	Sega	1991
Kiss Shot	Sega	Sega	1991
Medal City	Sega	Sega	1991
Mega Mind	Sega	Sega	1991
Nikkan Sports Pro Yakyū VAN	Sega	Sega	1991
Paddle Fighter	Sega	Sega	1991
Phantasy Star II: Amia's Adventure	Sega	Sega	1991
Phantasy Star II: Anne's Adventure	Sega	Sega	1991
Phantasy Star II: Huey's Adventure	Sega	Sega	1991
Phantasy Star II: Kinds's Adventure	Sega	Sega	1991
Phantasy Star II: Nei's Adventure	Sega	Sega	1991
Phantasy Star II: Rudger's Adventure	Sega	Sega	1991
Phantasy Star II: Shilka's Adventure	Sega	Sega	1991
Phantasy Star II: Eusis's Adventure	Sega	Sega	1991
Putter Golf	Sega	Sega	1991
Pyramid Magic	Sega	Sega	1991
Pyramid Magic II	Sega	Sega	1991
Pyramid Magic III	Sega	Sega	1991
Pyramid Magic Sōshūhen	Sega	Sega	1991
Pyramid Magic Special	Sega	Sega	1991
Pyramid Magic Yokokuhen	Sega	Sega	1991
Riddle Wired	Sega	Sega	1991
Robot Battler	Sega	Sega	1991
Sansan	White Box	Sansan	1994
Shikinjoh	Sunsoft	Sunsoft	1991
Shi no Meikyuu: Labyrinth of Death *	Sega	Sega	1991
Sonic Eraser	Sega	Sega	1991
Taiketsu! Columns	Sega	Sega	1994
Teddy Boy Blues	Sega	Sega	1991
Tel-Tel Mahjong *	Sunsoft; Chatnoir	Sunsoft	1990
Tel-Tel Stadium *	Sunsoft	Sunsoft	1990

" * " determines games that also had a physical release on Sega Genesis.

== Reception and legacy ==
Retrospective feedback on the Sega Meganet service is mixed, praising the early initiative to develop online gaming for video consoles, but criticizing its implementation via use of telephone lines and issues with Sega's lack of developers for the service. Adam Redsell of IGN commented on the basic features of the service, and despite noting that Meganet received only a few games, stated "[T]hat's pretty damn impressive for 1990". He also notes the influence of Sega in the development of online gaming, with the Meganet service as their first attempt, and credits the Meganet's successor, Sega Channel, with helping to spread broadband Internet.

The telephone line network which the Meganet ran on has been criticized for its logistical issues in online gaming. According to Electronic Gaming Monthly, "Even though the TeleGenesis modem has been announced, it has yet to appear and the real usefulness of a device that is used only to play games with friends over the phone lines remains questionable (both have to have the modem, the phone lines must be clear, the phone bills will be a problem if it's a long-distance call, etc.)" The same issues that plagued the Meganet over the use of phone lines for Internet connectivity would later resurface when Catapult Entertainment launched the XBAND service in 1994.

Ken Horowitz of Sega-16 took note of Sega's reluctance to commit to releasing the service in North America as part of the reason for its lack of titles, noting, "Companies were most likely waiting for confirmation of the modem's release before they began to commit themselves, and as time has attested, few were waiting to go ahead with development in light of Sega's 'wait and see' attitude." Horowitz went on to criticize this issue as a problem Sega would have again with the 32X in 1994, stating, "History would repeat itself in the harshest of manners only five years later. Sega's expectations of third party support for something it showed little enthusiasm for were entirely unrealistic and ultimately meant that no games would be in the pipeline." Former Sega console hardware research and development head Hideki Sato stated that Sega made very little money on sales of the Mega Modem, but that Sega learned from the experience to develop future network opportunities for the Sega Saturn.

== See also ==
- Dreamcast online functionality
- Sega Net Link
