= Tel-Tel Stadium =

1990 video game

- Cover art
- Developer: Sunsoft
- Publisher: Sunsoft
- Series: Tel-Tel
- Platform: Sega Mega Drive
- Release: JP: October 21, 1990
- Genre: Sports
- Modes: Single-player, multiplayer

Tel-Tel Stadium (ＴＥＬ・ＴＥＬスタジアム; "TEL · TEL Stadium") is a Sega Mega Drive baseball video game released in 1990. Along with Tel-Tel Mahjong it is a part of the Tel-Tel series and the game allowed the players to play an online multiplayer through the Sega MegaModem and the Sega Net Work System, as well to play against computer opponents.

== Gameplay ==
The batter is waiting for the pitcher to make his delivery.

The player becomes the coach as the individual players are not directly controlled. Instead, commands are given for pitching and batting; which may or may not be obeyed depending on the situation. The multiplayer mode is text-only while the single-player game has all the graphics in addition to the text. Thirty different teams are available in this game, with options ranging from actual Nippon Professional Baseball teams to little league baseball teams and even a team of professional wrestlers.

== Reception ==
On release, Famitsu magazine scored the game a 26 out of 40.
