= Online game =

Video game played over the Internet

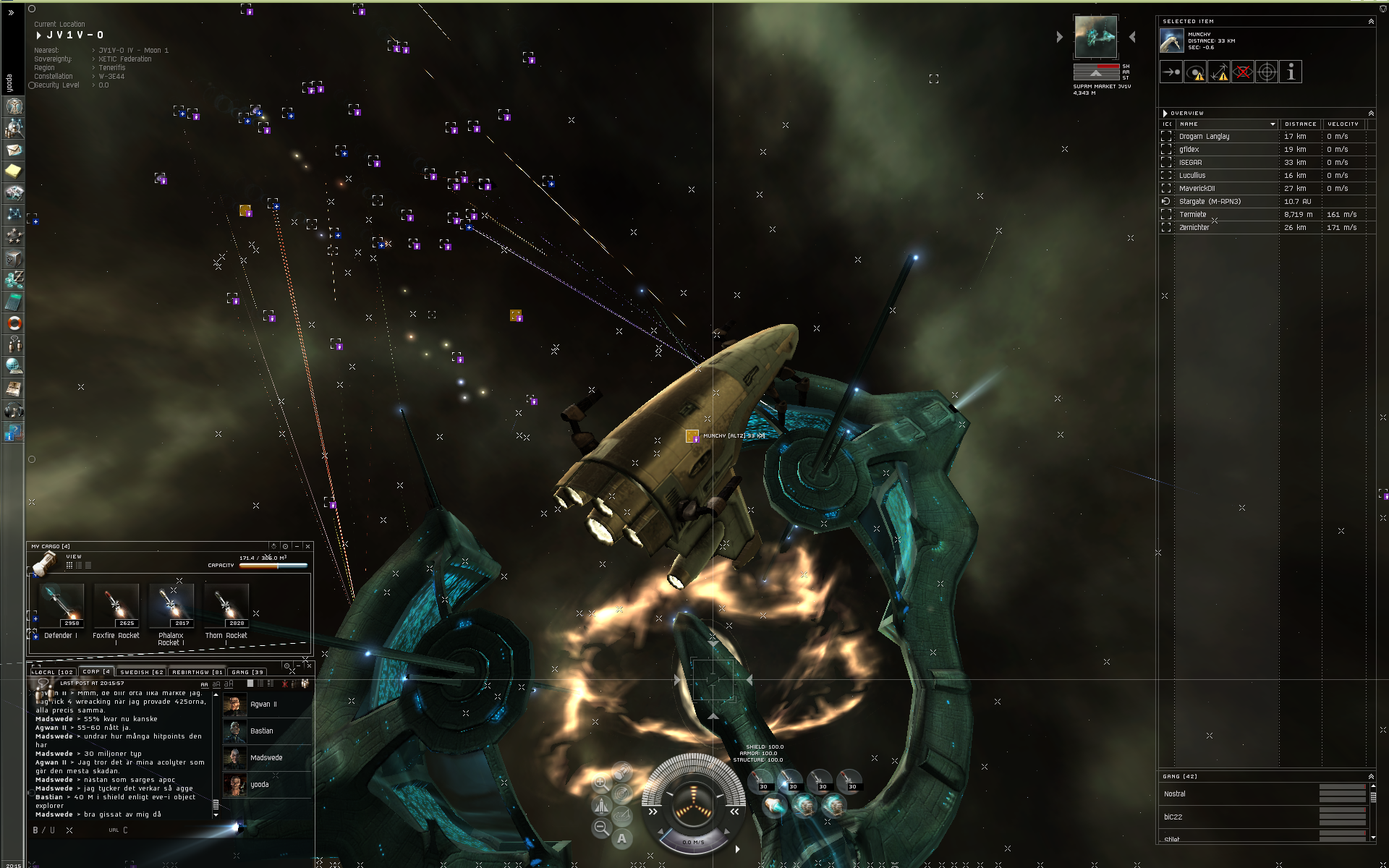
Combat in the game Eve Online

An online game is a video game that is either partially or primarily played through the Internet or any other computer network. Online games are ubiquitous on modern gaming platforms, including PCs, consoles and mobile devices, and span many genres, including first-person shooters, strategy games, massively multiplayer online role-playing games (MMORPG), and racing simulators. In 2019, revenue in the online games segment reached $16.9 billion, with $4.2 billion generated by China and $3.5 billion in the United States. Unlike purchased retail games, online games have the problem of not being permanently playable, as they require special servers in order to function.

The design of online games can range from simple text-based environments to the incorporation of complex graphics and virtual worlds. The existence of online components within a game can range from being minor features, such as an online leaderboard, to being part of core gameplay, such as directly playing against other players. Many online games create their own online communities, while other games, especially social games, integrate the players' existing real-life communities. Some online games can receive a massive influx of popularity due to many well-known Twitch streamers and YouTubers playing them.

Online gaming has drastically increased the scope and size of video game culture. Online games have attracted players of a variety of ages, nationalities, and occupations. The online game content is now being studied in the scientific field, especially gamers' interactions within virtual societies in relation to the behavior and social phenomena of everyday life. As in other cultures, the community has developed a gamut of slang words or phrases that can be used for communication in or outside of games. Many video games have also inspired internet memes and achieved a very large following online.

The culture of online gaming sometimes faces criticism for an environment that can promote cyberbullying, violence, and xenophobia. Some are also concerned about gaming addiction or social stigma. However, it has been argued that if the players of an online game are strangers to each other and have limited communication, the individual player's experience in an online game would not necessarily be different from playing with artificial intelligence players.

Online games are also subject to accessibility considerations, with developers and players employing various measures to support participation by people with disabilities.

== History ==
The history of online games dates back to the early days of packet-based computer networking in the 1970s, An early example of online games is MUDs, including the first, MUD1, which was created in 1978 and originally confined to an internal network before becoming connected to ARPANet in 1980. Commercial games followed in the next decade, with Islands of Kesmai, the first commercial online role-playing game, debuting in 1984, as well as more graphical games, such as the MSX LINKS action games in 1986, the flight simulator Air Warrior in 1987, and the Family Computer Network System's online Go game in 1987.

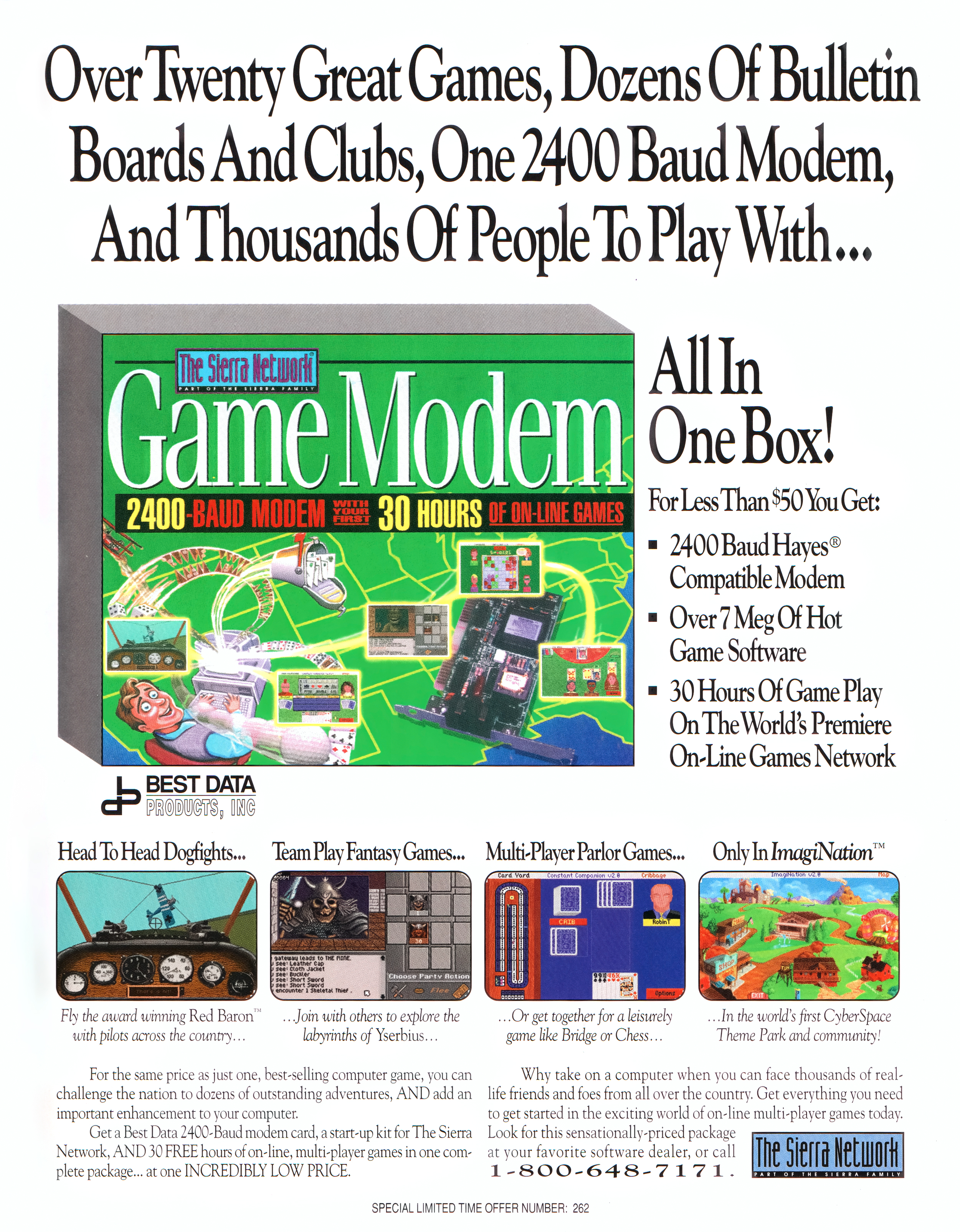
1991 advertisement for The Sierra Network

The availability of the Internet in the 1990s led to an expansion of online games, with notable titles including Nexus: The Kingdom of the Winds (1996), Quakeworld (1996), Ultima Online (1997), Lineage (1998), StarCraft (1998), Counter-Strike (1999) and EverQuest (1999). Video game consoles also began to receive online networking features, such as the Family Computer Network System (1987), Sega Meganet (1990), Satellaview (1995), SegaNet (2000), PlayStation 2 (2000) and Xbox (2001). Following improvements in connection speeds, more recent developments include the popularization of new genres, such as social games, and new platforms, such as mobile games.

Entering into the 2000s, the cost of technology, servers, and the Internet has dropped so far that fast Internet was commonplace, which led to previously unknown genres like massively multiplayer online games (MMOs) becoming well known. For example, World of Warcraft (2004) dominated much of the decade. Several other MMOs attempted to follow in Warcraft's footsteps, such as Star Wars Galaxies, City of Heroes, Wildstar, Warhammer Online, Guild Wars 2, and Star Wars: The Old Republic, but failed to make a significant impact in Warcraft's market share.

Over time, the MMORPG community has developed a sub-culture with its own slang and metaphors, as well as an unwritten list of social rules and taboos. Due to their growing online nature, modern video game slang overlaps heavily with internet slang, as well as leetspeak, with many words such as "pwn" and "noob". Another term that was popularized by the video game community is the abbreviation "AFK" to refer to people who are not at the computer or paying attention. Other common abbreviations include "GL HF" which stands for "good luck, have fun," which is often said at the beginning of a match to show good sportsmanship. Likewise, at the end of a game, "GG" or "GG WP" may be said to congratulate the opponent, win or lose, on a "good game, well played".

Separately, a new type of online game came to popularity alongside World of Warcraft, Defense of the Ancients (2003) which introduced the multiplayer online battle arena (MOBA) format. DotA, a community-created mod based on Warcraft III, gained in popularity as interest in World of Warcraft waned, but since the format was tied to the Warcraft property, others began to develop their own MOBAs, including Heroes of Newerth (2009), League of Legends (2010), and Dota 2 (2013). Blizzard Entertainment, the owner of Warcraft property, released their own take on the MOBA genre with Heroes of the Storm (2015), emphasizing on numerous original heroes from Warcraft III and other Blizzard's franchises. By the early 2010s, the genre had become a big part of the esports category.

Since the 2010s, a common trend among online games has been to operate them as games as a service, using monetization schemes such as loot boxes and battle passes as purchasable items atop freely-offered games.

During the last half of the 2010s, hero shooter, a variation of shooter games inspired by multiplayer online battle arenas and older class-based shooters, had a substantial rise in popularity with the release of Battleborn and Overwatch in 2016. The genre continued to grow with games such as Paladins (2018) and Valorant (2020).

A battle royale game format became widely popular with the release of PlayerUnknown's Battlegrounds (2017), Fortnite Battle Royale (2017), and Apex Legends (2019). The popularity of the genre continued in the 2020s with the release of the Call of Duty: Warzone (2020). Each game has received tens of millions of players within months of its release.

== Demographics ==
As of 2015, the average gamer was considered 31 years old. In 2025, globally, the average age grew to be 41 years old.

Before 2025, there was a general consensus of men being the main demographic of video games. Recently, though, this has been shown to be inaccurate. Although a worldwide number of male gamers still dominates over female (51% by 48%), women have been shown to spend more time playing in the United States (19.8 hours to 18.9 hours every week). Yet, it has been shown that women are more likely to experience gender discrimination in online games. With 88% of women in 2020 playing competitive online games, about 77% reported that they had experienced gender-specific discrimination. This has been attributed to a systemic sexism within video game communities and companies.

In 2025, a survey found that 50% Veterans of the United States that play video games have seen combat, and with 58-76% playing online with friends.

The report Online Game Market Forecasts estimated worldwide revenue from online games to reach $35 billion by 2017, up from $19 billion in 2011.

== Platforms ==
=== Console gaming ===
Xbox Live online service was launched in November 2002 for the original Xbox. Before that, the console only used a feature called system link, where players could connect two consoles using an Ethernet cable, or multiple consoles through a router. A similar online service was later introduced on the PlayStation 3 and PlayStation Portable consoles, in the form of the PlayStation Network.

For Nintendo consoles, Wii and Nintendo DS once supported a limited amount of online gaming via Nintendo Wi-Fi Connection. Nintendo then used Nintendo Network service to replace WFC, which fully supported online gaming with the Wii U and Nintendo 3DS. With the launch of the Nintendo Switch, Nintendo launched the Nintendo Switch Online service to replace the older Nintendo Network.

=== Browser games ===
As the World Wide Web developed and browsers became more sophisticated, people started creating browser games that used a web browser as a client. Simple single-player games were made that could be played using a web browser (most commonly made with web technologies like HTML, JavaScript, ASP, PHP and MySQL).

The development of web-based graphics technologies such as Flash and Java allowed browser games to become more complex. These games, also known by their related technology as "Flash games" or "Java games", became increasingly popular. Games ranged from simple concepts to large-scale games, some of which were later released on consoles. Many Java or Flash games were shared on various different websites, bringing them to wide audiences. The Flash Player was officially deprecated in 2017 and officially discontinued in 2020 for all users outside of mainland China, which resulted in many websites completely removing Flash games altogether. Browser-based pet games are popular among the younger generation of online gamers. These games range from gigantic games with millions of users, such as Neopets, to smaller and more community-based pet games. Some simpler browser games appeal to more casual game-playing demographic groups (notably older audiences).

== Types of interactions ==
=== Player versus environment (PvE) ===
PvE is a term used in online games, particularly MMORPGs and other role-playing video games, to refer to fighting computer-controlled opponents.

=== Player versus player (PvP) ===
PvP is a term broadly used to describe any game, or aspect of a game, where players compete against each other rather than against computer-controlled opponents.

== Online games ==
=== First-person shooter game (FPS) ===
During the 1990s, online games started to move from a wide variety of LAN protocols (such as IPX) and onto the Internet using the TCP/IP protocol. Doom popularized the concept of a deathmatch, where multiple players battle each other head-to-head, as a new form of online game. Since Doom, many first-person shooter games contain online components to allow deathmatch or arena-style play. And by popularity, first-person shooter games are becoming more and more widespread around the world. As games became more realistic and competitive, an e-sports community was born. Games like Counter-Strike, Halo, Call of Duty, Quake Live and Unreal Tournament are popular with these tournaments. These tournaments have a range of winnings from money to hardware.

Expansion of hero shooters, a sub-genre of shooter games, happened in 2016 when several developers released or announced their hero shooter multiplayer online game. Hero shooters have been considered to have strong potential as an esport, as a large degree of skill and coordination arises from the importance of teamwork. Some notable examples include Battleborn, Fortnite, Overwatch, Paladins and Valorant.

=== Real-time strategy game (RTS) ===
Early real-time strategy games often allowed multiplayer play over a modem or local network. As the Internet started to grow during the 1990s, software was developed that would allow players to tunnel the LAN protocols used by the games over the Internet. By the late 1990s, most RTS games had native Internet support, allowing players from all over the globe to play with each other. Popular RTS games with online communities have included Age of Empires, Sins of a Solar Empire, StarCraft and Warhammer 40,000: Dawn of War.

=== Massively multiplayer online game (MMO) ===
Massively multiplayer online games were made possible with the growth of broadband Internet access in many developed countries, using the Internet to allow hundreds of thousands of players to play the same game together. Many different styles of massively multiplayer games are available, such as:

- MMORPG (Massively multiplayer online role-playing game)
- MMORTS (Massively multiplayer online real-time strategy)
- MMOFPS (Massively multiplayer online first-person shooter)
- MMOSG (Massively multiplayer online social game)

=== Multiplayer online battle arena game (MOBA) ===
A specific subgenre of strategy video games referred to as multiplayer online battle arena (MOBA) gained popularity in the 2010s as a form of electronic sports, encompassing games such as the Defense of the Ancients mod for Warcraft III, League of Legends, Dota 2, Smite, and Heroes of the Storm. Major esports professional tournaments are held in venues that can hold tens of thousands of spectators and are streamed online to millions more. A strong fanbase has opened up the opportunity for sponsorship and advertising, eventually leading the genre to become a global cultural phenomenon.

=== Battle royale games ===
A battle royale game is a genre that blends the survival, exploration and scavenging elements of a survival game with last-man-standing gameplay. Dozens to hundreds of players are involved in each match, with the winner being the last player or team alive. Some notable examples include PlayerUnknown's Battlegrounds, Fortnite Battle Royale, Apex Legends and Call of Duty: Warzone each having received tens of millions of players within months of their releases. The genre is designed exclusively for multiplayer gameplay over the Internet.

=== MUD ===
MUD is a class of multi-user real-time virtual worlds, usually but not exclusively text-based, with a history extending back to the creation of MUD1 by Richard Bartle in 1978. MUDs were the direct predecessors of MMORPG.

=== Other notable games ===
A social deduction game is a multiplayer online game in which players attempt to uncover each other's hidden role or team allegiance using logic and deductive reasoning, while other players can bluff to keep players from suspecting them. A notable example of the social deduction video game is Among Us, which received a massive influx of popularity in 2020 due to many well-known Twitch streamers and YouTubers playing it. Among Us has also inspired internet memes and achieved a very large following online.

== Online game governance ==
Online gamers must agree to an End-user license agreement (EULA) when they first install the game application or an update. EULA is a legal contract between the producer or distributor and the end-user of an application or software, which is to prevent the program from being copied, redistributed or hacked. The consequences of breaking the agreement vary according to the contract. Players could receive warnings to termination, or direct termination without warning. In the 3D immersive world Second Life where a breach of contract will append the player warnings, suspension and termination depending on the offense.

Where online games support an in-game chat feature, it is not uncommon to encounter hate speech, sexual harassment and cyberbullying. Players, developers, gaming companies, and professional observers are discussing and developing tools which discourage antisocial behavior. There are also sometimes Moderators present, who attempt to prevent anti-Social behavior. Online games also often involve real-life illegal behavior, such as scams, financial crimes, invasion of privacy, and other issues.

Recent development of gaming governance requires all video games (including online games) to hold a rating label. The voluntary rating system was established by the Entertainment Software Rating Board (ESRB). A scale can range from "E" (stands for Everyone) indicating games that are suitable for both children and adults, to "M" (stands for Mature) recommending games that are restricted to age above 17. Some explicit online games can be rated "AO" (stands for Adult Only), identifying games that have content suitable for only adults over the age of 18. Furthermore, online games must also carry an ESRB notice that warns that any "online interactions are not rated by the ESRB".

== Shutdown of games ==
The video game industry is highly competitive. As a result, many online games end up not generating enough profits, such that the service providers do not have the incentives to continue running the servers. In such cases, the developers of a game might decide to shut down the server permanently.

Shutting down an online game can severely impact the players. Typically, a server shutdown means players will no longer be able to play the game. For many players, this can cause a sense of loss at an emotional level, since they often dedicate time and effort to making in-game progress, e.g., completing in-game tasks to earn items for their characters. In some other cases, the game might still be playable without the server, but certain important functionalities will be lost. For example, earning key in-game items often requires a server that can track each player's progress.

In some cases, an online game may be relaunched in a substantially different form after shutting down, in an attempt to increase the game's quality, remedy low sales, or reverse a declining player base, and see significantly greater success. Final Fantasy XIV was negatively received upon its 2010 release, and relaunched as A Realm Reborn in 2013 - the new version was met with considerable positive reception, and is still running as of 2022. Splitgate: Arena Warfare relaunched as Splitgate in 2021, switching to a free-to-play model and adding cross-platform multiplayer, and subsequently saw 2 million new players, with the servers being unable to handle the influx.

However, games may remain a commercial failure despite a planned relaunch. These include the 2015 asymmetrical first-person shooter Evolve, which transitioned to a free-to-play title known as Evolve Stage 2 a year after launch, after it was criticized for its significant amount of DLC despite being a full-priced game, but had its servers permanently shut down roughly two years later after its user base "evaporated" as a result of infrequent updates. The 2019 looter-shooter Anthem was also planned to be relaunched as Anthem Next, but the changes were never implemented, partially due to the impact of the COVID-19 pandemic and an unwillingness to further invest in the game by Electronic Arts.

== Accessibility for players with disabilities ==
In the United States, online video games with advanced communications services (ACS) such as voice and text chat are required to accommodate disabled users. Game developers may implement measures to support players with disabilities in several ways:

- Implement support for screen readers and similar tools.
- Utilize, during in-game chats, text-to-speech systems for players with visual impairments, and speech-to-text systems for players with hearing impairments.
- Provide players with disabilities with a clear overview of the game’s ACS features and accessibility settings.
- Offer various customer support services.

Besides regulatory requirements, users with accessibility challenges have been known to find their own unique methods to make the most out of their disabilities. These alterations to their game playing style include installing custom hardware modifications to physical gaming devices and playing in certain online servers that adjust the game experience to be more aligned with their abilities.

== See also ==
- List of video game genres
- Game server
- Massively multiplayer online game
- Multiplayer video game
- Online text-based role-playing game
- Voice chat in online gaming
