= Sega Net Link =

Attachment for the Sega Saturn

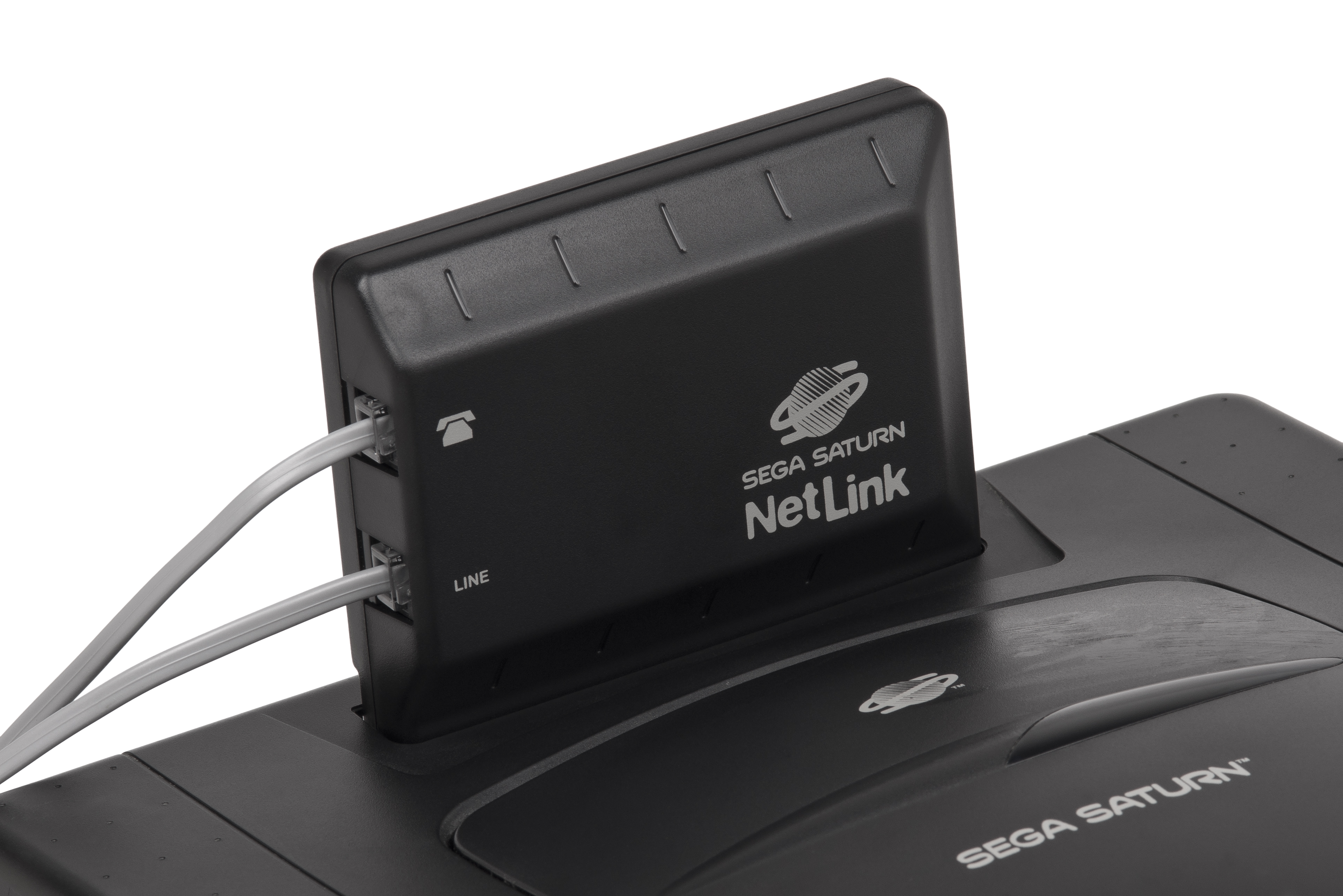
The Sega Net Link

Sega Net Link (also called Sega Saturn Net Link) is an attachment for the Sega Saturn game console to provide Saturn users with internet access and access to email through their console. The unit was released in October 1996. The Sega Net Link fit into the Sega Saturn cartridge port and consisted of a 28.8 kbit/s modem, a custom chip to allow it to interface with the Saturn, and a browser developed by Planetweb, Inc. The unit sold for US$199, or US$400 bundled with a Sega Saturn. In 1997 Sega began selling the NetLink Bundle, which included the standard NetLink plus the compatible games Sega Rally Championship and Virtual On: Cyber Troopers NetLink Edition, for $99.

The Net Link connected to the internet through standard dial-up services. Unlike other online gaming services in the US, one does not connect to a central service, but instead tells the dial-up modem connected to the Saturn's cartridge slot to call to the person with whom one wishes to play. Since it requires no servers to operate, the service can operate as long as at least two users have the necessary hardware and software, as well as a phone line.

Other countries, that received the Net Link are Finland (as test market for rest of the Europe) and Brazil.

In Japan, however, gamers did connect through a centralized service known as SegaNet, which would later be taken offline and converted for Dreamcast usage.

== History ==
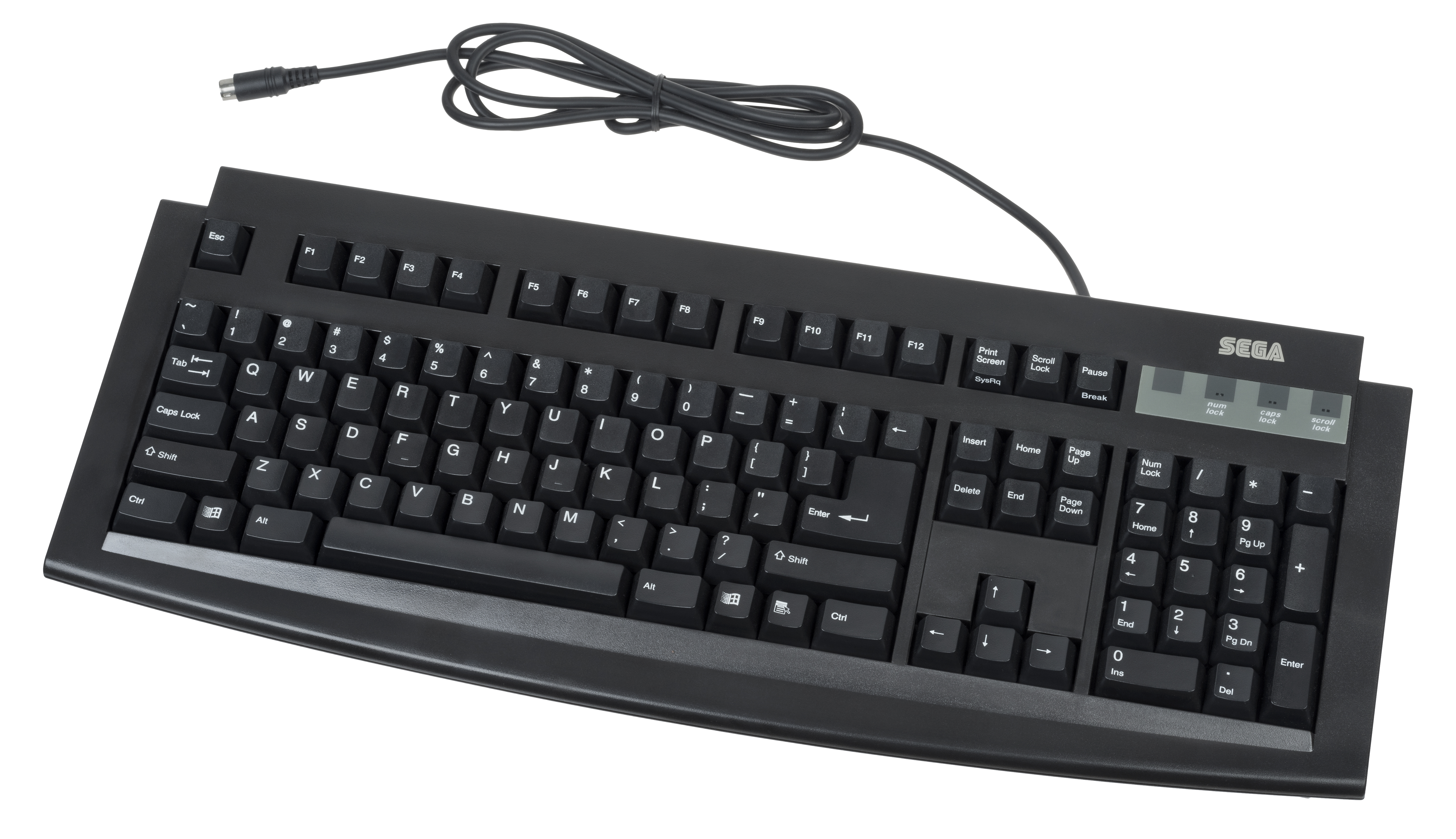
An official Sega-branded keyboard for the Saturn, used for browsing the internet with Net Link

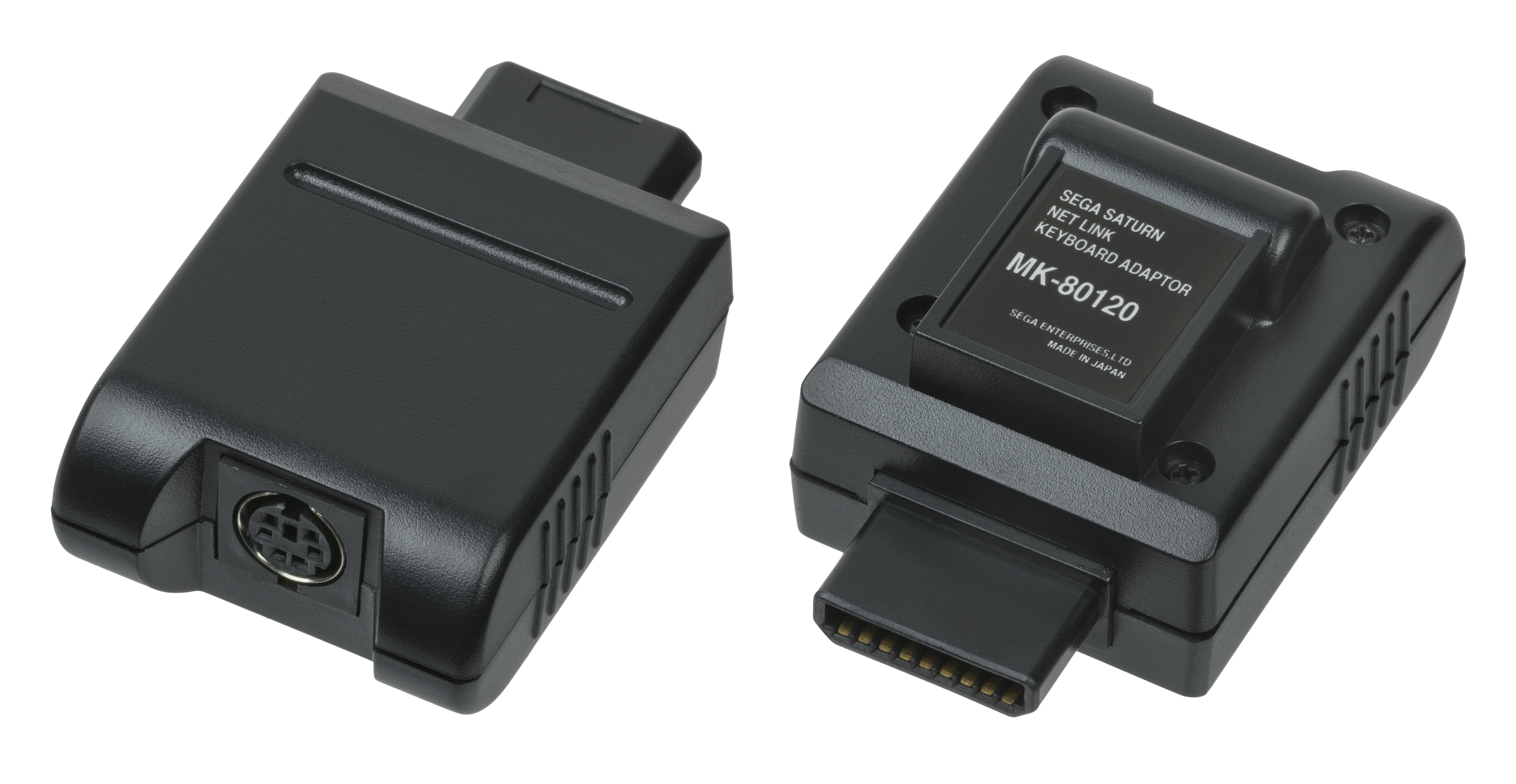
A PS/2 keyboard adapter, required for connecting a keyboard to the Saturn for web browsing

According to Yutaka Yamamoto, Sega of America's director of new technology, the Saturn's design allowed it to access the internet purely through software: "Sega engineers always felt the Saturn would be good for multimedia applications as well as game playing. So they developed a kernel in the operating system to support communications tasks."

While the Net Link was not the first accessory which allowed console gamers in North America to play video games online (see online console gaming), it was the first to allow players to use their own Internet service provider (ISP) to connect. While Sega recommended that players use Concentric, the Sega Net Link enabled players to choose any ISP that was within its technical specifications. The device was capable of connecting at a 28.8 kilobit/s connection in America and 14.4 kbit/s in Japan. However, it suffered from memory limitations; the modem's static RAM could store only account information and bookmarks, leaving only the Saturn's limited internal RAM for any downloaded data. This makes it impossible to download audio or video clips, save e-mail messages, or put previously loaded web pages into cache.

In Japan, the Net Link required the use of smartcards with prepaid credits. The Saturn had a floppy drive and printer cable converter (both Japan only) which could be used with the Net Link. A web browser from Planetweb was included, and a mouse and keyboard adapter were available to simplify navigation. Sega also released a dedicated Saturn mouse and Saturn keyboard. In addition, to allow users to browse with just the Saturn joypad, Sega produced a series of CDs containing hundreds of website addresses. The browser included a space magnifying function.

The Planetweb browser was written in C, and runs on just 570 KB, whereas a typical PC browser of the time used up about 6 MB. At the time most television screens ran at a lower resolution than computer monitors, so the browser used anti-aliasing to smooth out the edges of onscreen text characters. The browser could not properly display web sites which use frames.

Five games were released that supported the NetLink. All five were released in late 1997, nearly a year after the NetLink itself. Players could search for other players either on the Internet or using the XBAND matchmaking system, then connect peer-to-peer via modem, or alternatively, use two NetLinks to connect two Saturns and two televisions set up in the same room (thus eliminating the need for a phone line and essentially using the NetLink to emulate the Saturn Link Cable).

Launching at 15,000 yen in Japan and $199 in the USA, it was considered very inexpensive compared to competing online services. It was a runner-up for Electronic Gaming Monthly's Best Peripheral of 1996 (behind the Saturn analog controller). Despite the media excitement over the device and its prominent appearance in Sega's marketing campaign, less than 1% of Saturn owners purchased the NetLink in 1996. Over its lifetime, an estimated 50,000 NetLink units were sold in North America, half of Sega's original goal. Another 1,100 units were donated by Sega of America to schools, in partnership with the nonprofit group Projectneat.

In 2017, fans were able to make the NetLink work a modern highspeed connection with VoIP.

== Net Link Zone ==
The Net Link Zone connected to an Internet Relay Chat (IRC) server irc.sega.com which was changed to the server irc0.dreamcast.com on the release of Sega's Dreamcast. These servers were originally run by Sega employees but were given over to be run by Net Link chat users Leo Daniels and Mark Leatherman.

== Successor ==
SegaNet was launched in 2000 for the Dreamcast, carrying the same name in Japan. The European counterpart was called Dreamarena.

== Compatible games ==
The following games are compatible with the Net Link:

- Daytona USA CCE NetLink Edition
- Duke Nukem 3D
- Saturn Bomberman
- Sega Rally Championship Plus
- Virtual On: Cyber Troopers NetLink Edition
- Space Hulk

== See also ==
- Sega Meganet
- SegaNet
