= Family Computer Network System =

Peripheral for the Family Computer

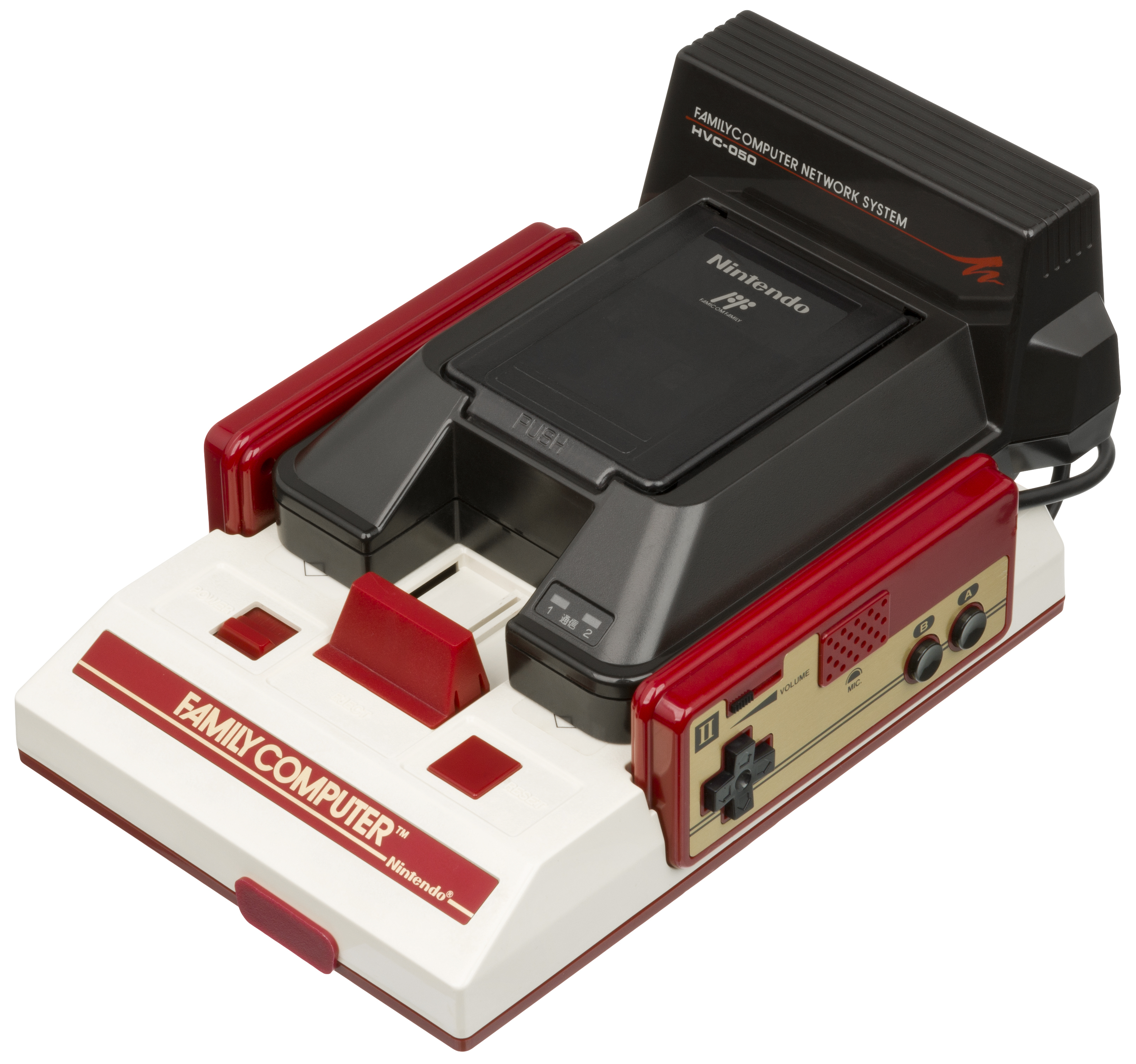
- Famicom with modem
- Developer: Nintendo
- Type: Modem peripheral
- Generation: Third generation
- Released: JP: September 1988
- Lifespan: 3 years
- Discontinued: JP: 1991
- Units shipped: 130,000
- Removable storage: ROM card
- Controller input: Famicom controller with numeric keypad
- Connectivity: Dial-up modem
- Online services: Nomura Securities
- Predecessor: Disk Fax kiosks
- Successor: Satellaview
- Related: 64DD

The Family Computer Network System (Japanese: ファミリーコンピュータ ネットワークシステム, Hepburn: Famirī Konpyūta Nettowāku Shisutemu), also known as the Famicom Net System and Famicom Modem, is a peripheral for Nintendo's Family Computer video game console, and was released in September 1988 only in Japan. Predating the modern Internet, its proprietary dial-up information service accessed live stock trades, video game cheats, jokes, weather forecasts, betting on horse racing, and a small amount of downloadable content. The device uses a ROM card storage format, reminiscent to the HuCard for the TurboGrafx-16 and the Sega Card for the Master System.

Nintendo gained experience with this endeavor which led directly to its satellite based Satellaview network for the Super Famicom in the early 1990s.

== History ==
=== Development ===
In 1986, Nintendo's entry into basic online communications was the Disk Fax kiosks, preannouncing the deployment of 10,000 kiosks throughout Japan's toy and hobby stores within the following year. This allowed Famicom players with Famicom Disk System games to bring their writable Disk Cards into stores and upload their high scores to the company's central leaderboards via fax, enter nationwide achievement contests, and download new games cheaper than on cartridge.

By 1987, Nintendo president Hiroshi Yamauchi foresaw the impending Information Age, developing a vision for transforming Nintendo beyond a toy company and into a communications company. He wanted to leverage Famicom's established and totally unique presence in one third of all of Japan's homes, to bring Nintendo into the much larger and virtually limitless communications industry and thus presumptively on par with Japan's largest company and national telephone service provider, Nippon Telegraph and Telephone (NTT). He believed the Famicom should become an appliance of the future, as pervasive as the telephone itself. Beginning in mid-1987, he requested the exploration of a partnership with the Nomura Securities financial company, to create an information network service in Japan based on the Famicom. Led by Famicom's designer Masayuki Uemura, Nintendo Research & Development 2 developed the modem hardware; and Nomura Securities developed the client and server software and the information database. Uemura cautioned that they "weren't confident that they would be able to make network games entertaining". Five unreleased prototypes of network-enabled games were developed for the system, including Yamauchi's favorite ancient Japanese board game, Go.

=== Production ===
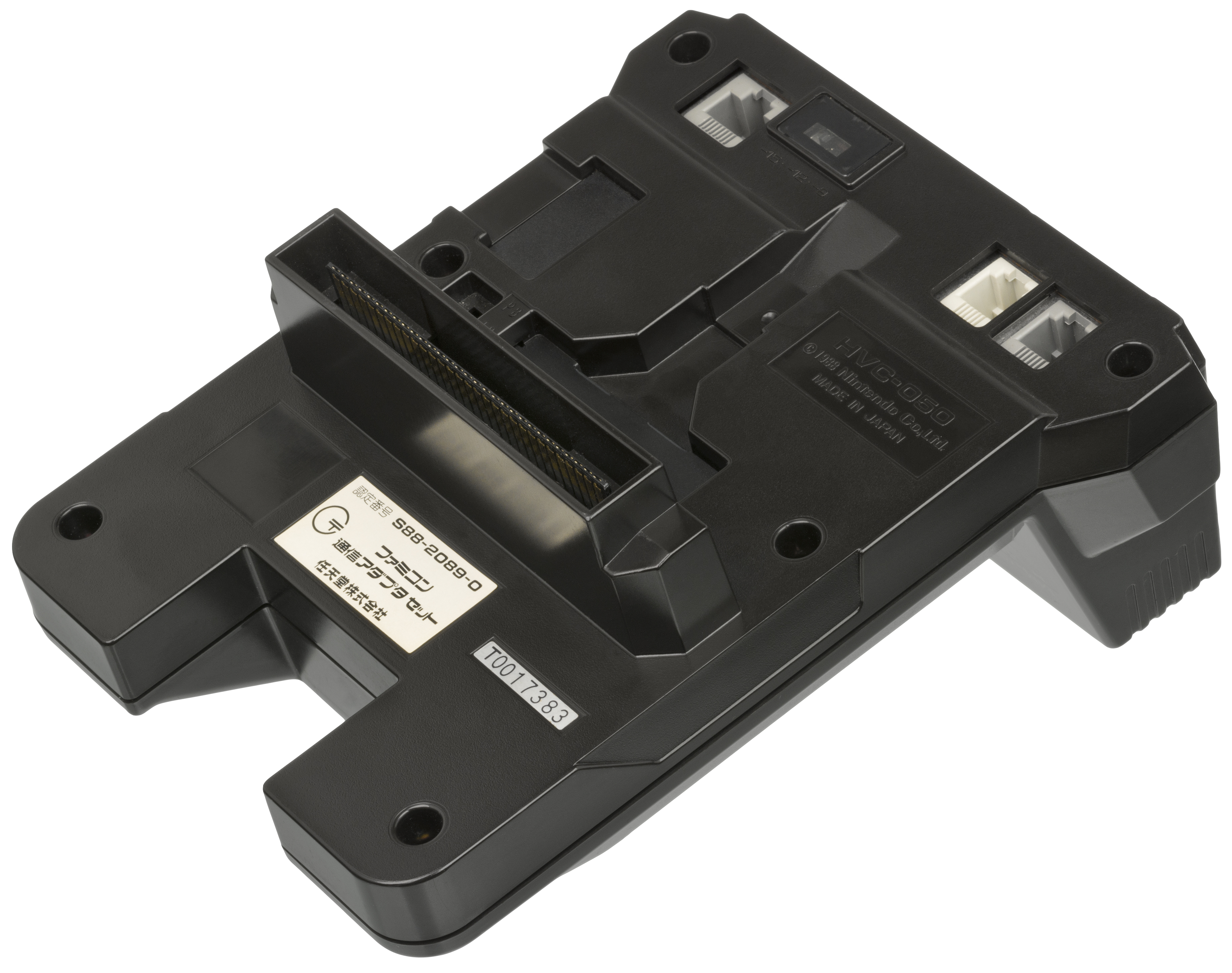
The telephone line connectors on the bottom of the modem

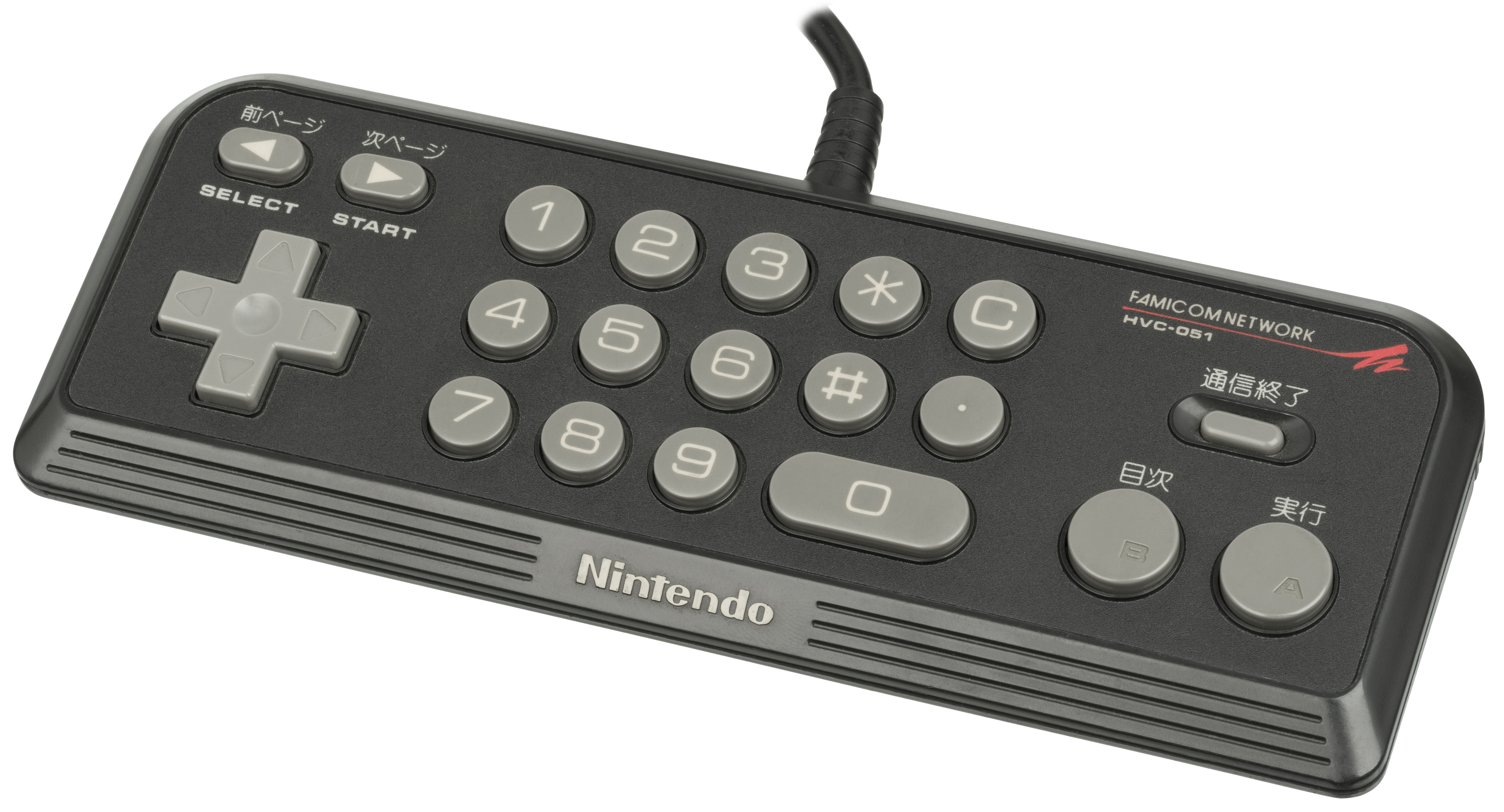
The controller included with the modem

The Famicom Modem began mass production in September 1988. The accompanying proprietary online service called the Famicom Network System was soon launched the same year alongside Nippon Telegraph and Telephone's new DDX-TP telephone gateway for its existing packet switched network. NTT's launch initially suffered reliability problems that were painstakingly assessed by Nintendo at individual users' homes and traced back to the network.

Yamauchi said in Nintendo's 1988 corporate report that this system would "link Nintendo households to create a communications network that provides users with new forms of recreation, and a new means of accessing information". Yamauchi said to employees that the company's new purpose in addition to games was now "to provide information that can be efficiently used in each household".

By 1989, Nintendo had become Japan's number one company and Yamauchi wanted to position the Famicom as the key portal to a previously inconceivably large-scale potential future network of freely accessible and vital information in all aspects of daily life. Anticipating a new economy of service fees and sales commissions, he imagined Nintendo's future as the gatekeeper of expanded online shopping, with airline tickets and constant information feeds of news and movie reviews. With "intense personal commitment", he approved a multimillion-dollar advertising budget for online services, personally met with representatives in the financial industry, and successfully signed up the Daiwa and Nikko stock brokerages as service providers. In June 1989, Nintendo of America's vice president of marketing Peter Main, said of the Japanese market that the six-year-old Famicom was present in 37% of Japan's households and that the Famicom Network System had been supporting video games and stock trading applications for some time in Japan. New services included buying stamps online from the postal service, betting on horse racing, the Super Mario Club for game reviews, and the Bridgestone Tire Company using a Famicom online fitness program for its employees.

By 1991, all these Famicom Network System online services had shut down, except for the Super Mario Club as the sole final application of the Famicom Modem and Network System. Super Mario Club had been formed for toy shops, where the Famicom was deployed as a networked kiosk, serving consumers with a member-store-created searchable online database of Famicom game reviews. Nintendo performed market research by analyzing users' search behaviors, and directly receiving user feedback messages.

In that year, the disappointed but steadfast Yamauchi stated, "It is just a matter of time. When the people are ready for it, we have the Network in place."

== Reception ==
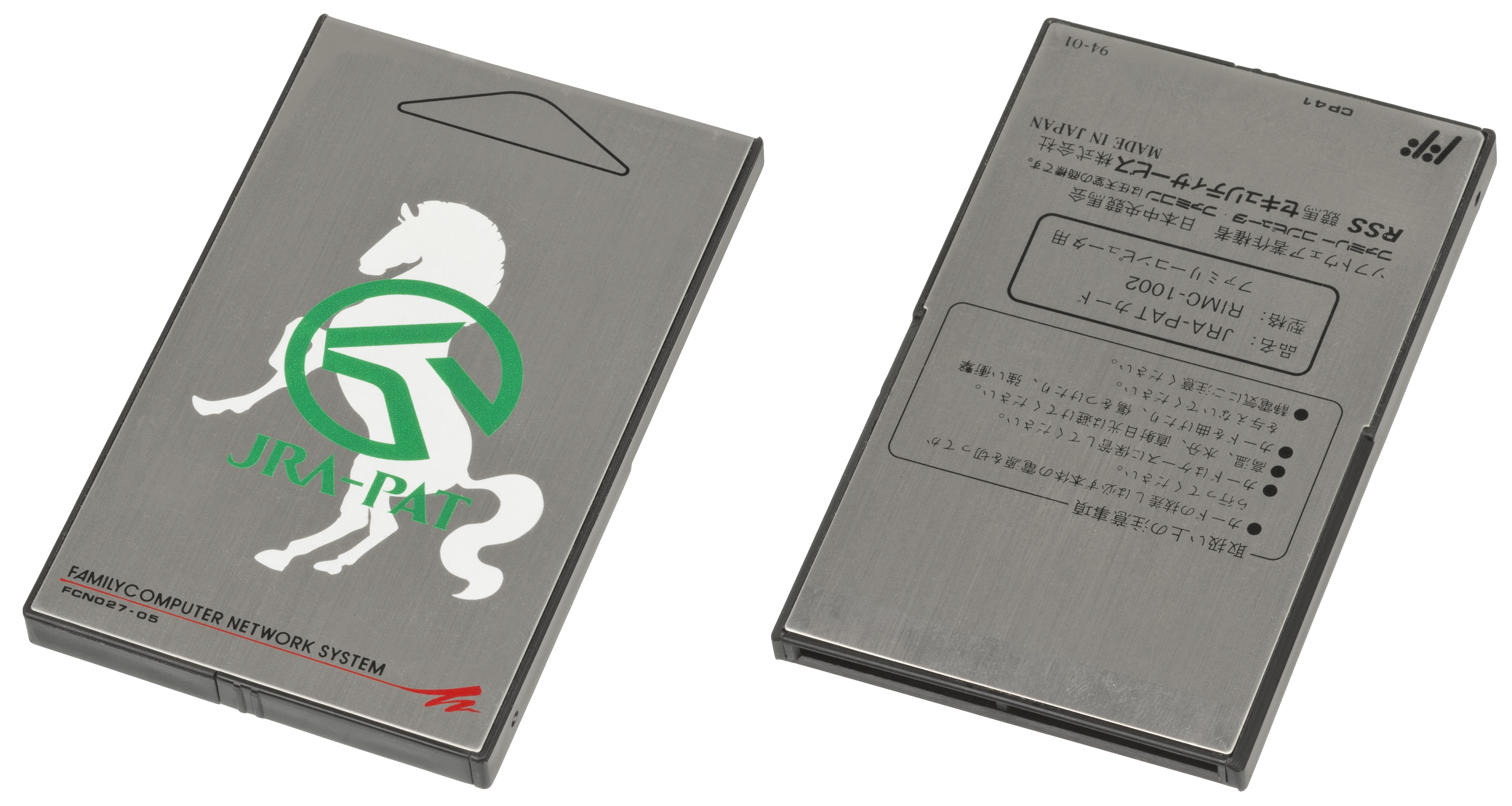
The software card for the JRA PAT horse betting program

Nintendo shipped a lifetime total of 130,000 Famicom Modems and the Famicom Network System had 15,000-20,000 users for stock brokering services, 14,000 for banking, and 3,000 businesses for Super Mario Club. Even after the resolution of stability problems with the NTT's network launch, the Famicom Network System's market presence was considered "weak" for its whole lifetime for various reasons: product usability; competition from personal computers and other appliances; and the difficult nature of early adoption by the technologically unsavvy financial customer. Many found it just as easy to do transactions by traditional means, and the total home networking market was very small because people didn't want to rewire their house for their television or to have their telephone line occupied. Uemura stated that the system's most popular application was ultimately home-based betting on horse racing, with a peak of 100,000 Famicom Modem units used and capturing 35% of Japan's fanatical online horse betting market even among diverse competition from PCs and from dedicated horse betting network terminal appliances.

=== Legacy ===
Wanting to replicate and expand upon the progress seen with the Famicom Modem in Japan, Nintendo of America began a series of open announcements in mid-1989 to describe its private talks with AT&T over the prospect of launching an information network service in America in 1990. The plans never materialized.

A modem for NES was tested in the United States by the Minnesota State Lottery. It would have allowed players to buy scratchcards and play the lottery with their NES at home. It was not released in the United States because some parents and legislators voiced concern that minors might learn to play the lottery illegally and anonymously, regardless of assurances from Nintendo to the contrary. Internet-based gambling was banned in Minnesota.

Online content would later be delivered to Nintendo's customers via the Super Famicom's Satellaview peripheral. Masayuki Uemura, lead designer of the Famicom Modem at Nintendo Research & Development 2, said: "Our experiences with the Famicom Modem triggered Nintendo's entrance into the satellite data broadcasting market in April, 1995".

== See also ==
- 64DD's Japan-based dialup Internet service called Randnet, from December 1999 to February 2001
- Nintendo Entertainment System's Teleplay Modem
- Famicom Disk System
- Atari 2600's GameLine
- Intellivision's PlayCable
- Sega Genesis's Sega Channel
- XBAND
- Super Famicom's Satellaview
