= PlayCable =

Online service for the Intellivision

- Developer: Mattel, General Instrument
- Type: Online service
- Launched: 1980; 46 years ago
- Discontinued: 1984
- Platform: Intellivision
- Status: Dissolved

PlayCable was an online service introduced in 1980 that allowed local cable television system operators to send games for the Intellivision over cable wires alongside normal television signals. Through the service, subscribers would use a device, called the PlayCable adapter, to download the games for play on their Intellivision. It was the first service that allowed users to download games for play on a video game console. PlayCable was not widely adopted, due in part to high costs for users and operators, as well as limitations of the PlayCable adapter. The service was discontinued in 1984.

== History ==
PlayCable was developed as a joint venture between Mattel and General Instrument. The PlayCable service was deep in development even before the Intellivision was widely released. In 1979, tests of the service were announced for several cities, including Moline, Illinois, Jackson, Mississippi and Boise, Idaho. The service was officially launched in June 1980. Subscriptions were available for a monthly fee, allowing users access to a selection of games through cable television providers that supported the service. Up to 20 titles were available each month. Former professional baseball player Mickey Mantle appeared in commercials for the service. According to a CED Magazine article, the service was available in thirteen cities in 1981, including Fayetteville, New York. Initial estimates by Mattel projected that the service would have 1 million subscribers within five years, but as of Spring 1983, fewer than 3% of households which could access PlayCable were subscribed. Cable operators complained about the high cost of the computer needed to run the service as well as the cost of the in-home PlayCable adapters; the adapters proved to be inadequate to run the larger Intellivision games being produced. In addition, Mattel Electronics was losing millions of dollars due to the video game industry crash of 1983 and stopped all new hardware development in August that year. PlayCable was discontinued in 1984, three years after it was introduced.

== Implementation and limitations ==
The PlayCable channel was broadcast from a PDP-11 minicomputer located at the subscriber's cable company using dedicated frequencies within the FM Band of the cable line. A PlayCable adapter peripheral would be inserted into the cartridge slot of the Intellivision Master Component and connected to the cable line. This adapter contained an FM radio receiver, digital interface, 512-word firmware ROM and 8K of RAM for game storage. When turned on, the firmware within the PlayCable adapter tuned its FM receiver to the PlayCable catalog channel, always broadcast at 107.7 MHz, and downloaded a program to the adapter's RAM. This program would display a menu of 15 available titles that could be played. The selection of games changed at the start of each month, and after October 1982 was increased to 20 titles. Users chose a title to play using the Intellivision controller keypad. Having chosen a game, the menu program would request that the adapter firmware re-tune the receiver to the channel broadcasting the selected title and wait for the start of its code. Once the title was found in the data stream and downloaded to the adapter's internal memory, control was passed to the game, starting play. Depending on the size of the game, the entire loading process took an average of between 10 and 20 seconds.

The 8K of memory inside PlayCable adapters proved to be insufficient for the larger games that Mattel started to release in 1983. To this point PlayCable was compatible with 90% of Mattel's catalogue of Intellivision titles, with only Chess and three Intellivoice games proving problematic. Compatibility fell with the introduction of 12K and 16K titles, such as Pinball and Bump 'n' Jump, and the release of games dependent on the Intellivision Entertainment Computer System (ECS). Despite this, 47 titles in the full 61-game Mattel catalogue were compatible with PlayCable when Mattel Electronics closed its Intellivision business in early 1984. Therefore, the fact that PlayCable was restricted to first-party titles, effectively blocking 33 compatible third-party games, had a larger impact on the potential catalogue of games the service could have offered.

== See also ==
- GameLine
- Nabu Network
- Sega Channel
- Satellaview
