= College Football's National Championship =

1994 video game

- Cover art
- Developer: BlueSky Software
- Publisher: Sega
- Platform: Sega Genesis
- Release: NA: August 1994
- Genre: Traditional American football simulation
- Modes: Single-player; Multiplayer

College Football's National Championship is a 1994 American football video game that was released exclusively for the North American Sega Genesis video game system. A sequel, College Football's National Championship II, was released in 1995.

== Summary ==
The game is based on the 1993 NCAA Division I-A football season.

Considered to be a clone of NFL Football '94 Starring Joe Montana with college teams, the game used exactly the same engine as the original program. Exhibition games, a tournament with 4, 8, 16 or 32 teams, a division challenge where you can play against other teams in your region before you play nationally and a "race for #1" where you play a regular season schedule which you can customize. Four players can play simultaneously with the help of the Team Player adaptor. Tournaments can be completely customized with either a customized schedule length and even a customized selection of opponents. Even the Wishbone and Option formations that were used in college football at that time were included.

Lon Simmons does the voice commentary in the game; he did the voice for all the Sports Talk Baseball series of video games for the Sega Genesis. There is a battery save that saves team records that are important for each college.
