= Metal Fatigue (video game) =

2000 video game

- Developer: Zono
- Publishers: EU: Psygnosis; NA: TalonSoft
- Designer: Jason Hough
- Platform: Microsoft Windows
- Release: DE: 18 May 2000; EU: 28 May 2000; NA: 31 July 2000
- Genre: Real-time strategy
- Modes: Single-player, multiplayer

Metal Fatigue (released in Europe as Metal Conflict) is a 2000 real-time strategy computer game developed by Zono and published by Psygnosis in Europe and TalonSoft in the United States. Players assume the role of one of three factions named CorpoNations: RimTech, Mil-Agro and Neuropa, each locked in conflict on the planet Hedoth Prime to claim its alien technology. Players build structures and recruit units to overpower computer or multiplayer opponents. The gameplay occurs over a map with multiple layers, including ground, underground and orbital levels. Key units include combots, which are robots with customisable limbs that can be assembled by players, and upgraded by taking pieces of enemy combots on the battlefield.

Metal Fatigue was the first computer game released by the developer, who aimed to innovate on the genre by introducing multiple layers to real-time battles and the inclusion of combots. The European publisher, Psygnosis, closed its North American division shortly before release, leading the game to be published by TalonSoft in that region. Upon release, the game received average reviews, with critics directing praise to the customisability of the game's combots and their impact on the gameplay, although critiquing the game's difficulty and lack of distinction from other contemporary strategy titles.

== Gameplay ==
Players build and deploy robots named "combots" to fight on the battlefield.

Metal Fatigue is a real-time strategy game played on a 3D map in a fixed isometric perspective. The objective of the game is to collect resources and recruit units to win battles against one or more opponents. Single-player gameplay follows three series of ten-mission campaigns split over the game's three CorpoNations. Before starting, players will receive a briefing, and after completion of the mission, receive a debrief to progress the story. The game also offers a Skirmish mode, allowing players to compete against one or more opponents on single maps. In this mode, players can customise the starting location, budget, and win conditions for the match. Players win a mission by defeating all the enemy units, destroying the enemy base, or completing the mission's specific objectives. Missions begin with a prebuild phase, allowing players to use starting resources to build or recruit units within a radius of their base.

Gameplay takes place over three battlefield layers: surface, orbital and underground. Most gameplay action occurs on the surface layer, where trucks can be constructed to collect resources. The orbital layer features asteroids that can only be traversed between by aerial units. Underground layers feature tunnels that must be accessed via an elevator shaft, and require drill trucks to excavate new areas. The game features two resources: energy and manpower. Energy is extracted by harvester trucks from lava flows on the ground or subterranean layer, or more efficient solar panels on the orbital layer. Energy is converted into megajoules, which can be used to construct buildings. Manpower is required to construct units, and is increased by constructing cryofarms; low manpower affects the efficiency of building production.

The core offensive units in the game are robots named combots. Combots are constructed at an Assembly Bay from four modular parts: a torso, legs, left arm and right arm, with the arms containing weapons, such as katanas, axes and hammers, that influence their ability to deliver different damage types, or shields. Each CorpoNation has unique components to their combots: Mil-Agro has parts focusing on close melee, Neuropa long-range energy attacks, and RimTech a mixture of close and long-range types. When enemy combots are defeated, players can use vehicles to collect their parts from the battlefield and attach them to their own robots. Other offensive units can be recruited, including tanks, surface-to-air missile launchers, artillery units, and an anti-combot unit. Aerial units include jets and bombers. Completion of missions and secondary mission objectives allows the player to earn points, which can be spent in between missions to increase unit experience or improve the quality or efficiency of other vehicles or structures. Unit experience accrues throughout gameplay and carries over for surviving units between missions. Hotkeys are available that allow the player to select and command units.

Metal Fatigue features multiplayer gameplay, including LAN and online play, and supported third-party services including MPlay. The game includes 30 multiplayer maps that can be played in deathmatch or co-operative play.

== Plot ==
During the 23rd century, humanity has discovered faster-than-light travel and has finally reached the stars. Conquests and exploration across the galaxy are done in the name of large companies named CorpoNations. The ruins of civilizations which appear to have been annihilated eons ago are scattered all over the galaxy. The CorpoNations organised an expedition to the planet Hedoth Prime, leading to the discovery of a warlike, alien race with vastly superior technology.

Each campaign in Metal Fatigue follows one of the three lead characters: Diego, Jonas, and Stefan Angelus, sent on the initial RimTech expedition to Hedoth Prime. The brothers are separated from one another leading each towards a different faction: Jonas takes a combot arm to Neuropa, Stefan is captured by Mil-Agro, and Diego returns to RimTech. After the discovery of Hedoth alien technology, the CorpoNations prepare for all-out war to claim its power for their own. In the game's conclusion, the Hedoth reveal that they let the humans fight each other as a test to see if they were worthy of being soldiers in the Hedoth's armies. The Hedoth announce that humans would make excellent soldiers in the Hedoth armies, and that humanity is ready to learn obedience.

== Development and release ==
Metal Fatigue was the first computer game developed by American studio Zono, who previously created Sega console titles including Technoclash (1993) and Mr. Bones (1996). Lead designer Jason Hough stated that the game's design sought to innovate on the real-time strategy game formula, conceiving of a "fresh" approach to the genre through the additions of "reconfigurable, amputating robots and the multi-layer battlefield". The original concept for the game was to feature "robots that could re-configure themselves with various things they'd find in the game". The studio rebuilt the game to be fully 3D as hardware acceleration became more commonplace throughout development, creating the engine "from the ground up" to support D3D and OpenGL. Japanese anime, including the Gundam series, and fighting games including Tekken were strong influences for the design of the game's robots, as well as the real-time strategy titles Total Annihilation, Myth and Herzog Zwei for the game's design. Programmer Mark Baldwin designed the game's AI to be "generals" with distinct personalities, managing its strategy by prioritising projects based on player behaviour.

Publisher Psygnosis showcased the game at E3 1999, and an online multiplayer demo was released in March 2000. Psygnosis closed their American division in April 2000, and TalonSoft acquired the publishing rights in the United States. Metal Fatigue was released on the week of 31 July 2000, and published in Europe under the name Metal Conflict. On 31 July 2018, Nightdive Studios published a remastered version of the game on Steam.

== Reception ==
Reception

Aggregate score
| Aggregator | Score |
|---|---|
| Metacritic | 68% |

Review scores
| Publication | Score |
|---|---|
| AllGame | 3.5/5 |
| Computer Games Magazine | 3.5/5 |
| Computer Gaming World | 3/5 |
| Eurogamer | 7/10 |
| Game Informer | 8.75/10 |
| GamePro | 4/5 |
| GameSpot | 6.9/10 |
| GameSpy | 85% |
| IGN | 7.1/10 |
| PC PowerPlay | 76% |
| PC Zone | 58% |

Pre-release previews of the game were generally positive, giving praise to the game's multi-level design and inclusion of robots. Several critics described the game as "exciting" or innovative, reflecting on the shared view that the real-time strategy genre had stagnated by 2000. Computer Games Magazine considered the preview's graphics to appear "rather conventional" and reminiscent of Total Annihilation, and the factions subpar to StarCraft.

Upon release, Metal Fatigue received "mixed or average" reviews, according to review aggregator Metacritic. Critics expressed mixed assessments on whether its gameplay additions were innovative, with some feeling they were, and others considering it at best on par or derivative to other titles such as Command & Conquer: Tiberian Sun and Earth 2150. Dismissing the game as having "little in the way of innovation", Keith Pullin of PC Zone felt the game paled to its contemporaries. Computer Gaming World said the game did offer "something different, interesting, and even exciting", but featured the same "frustrations and failures" common to strategy games. Similarly, IGN noted that Metal Fatigue "does a few novel and interesting things to break with the RTS standard", but the game was a "rehash of so many standard RTS conventions".

The inclusion of customizable combots was praised by many reviewers as a highlight of the game and a key differentiating element from other titles. Eurogamer commended the ability to customize pieces and pilot skills as adding "quite a bit of depth to the game" and adding a role-playing gameplay element. Ryan Hovingh of PC PowerPlay also considered the bots to "distinguish the game from most other titles in the genre" and allow for an "incredible variety" of customization. Computer Games Magazine said the varied attack methods added a strategic element and could "easily change the dynamics of a mission", but found they ignored commands and had poor pathfinding. In contrast to the praise directed to the combots, reviewers felt the game's other units were limited, with GameSpot stating the units were "rather simple and functionally equivalent for the three sides".

The multi-level gameplay was met with a mixed reception, with several critics feeling it introduced needless difficulty and long mission lengths. Considering the game to be one of the most aggravating and complicated real-time strategy games reviewed, Nick Woods of Allgame critiqued the game's endless missions due to the enemy's "relentless" ability to persevere across the three layers. Computer Gaming World felt the design introduced some "tactically interesting moments", but introduced complexity and "massive headaches of micromanagement". GameSpot stated that whilst the three-tiered layout of Metal Fatigue "helps balance the game's otherwise combot-heavy combat", it "puts undue stress on the most important resource in a real-time strategy game - a player's time - without easing the issue of multitasking".
