= Vectorman =

1995 video game

- North American cover art
- Developer: BlueSky Software
- Publisher: Sega
- Producers: Jerry Markota; Jenny Cleary
- Designers: Rich Karpp; Mark Lorenzen
- Composer: Jon Holland
- Platform: Sega Genesis
- Release: NA: October 24, 1995; EU: November 1995
- Genre: Platform
- Mode: Single-player

Vectorman is a 2D action platformer video game developed by BlueSky Software and published by Sega. The game was released for the Sega Genesis in late 1995 in North America and Europe. It was considered a critical and commercial success, achieving its dual goal of retaining interest in the aging Sega Genesis platform in face of the increasingly popular new technology of the next generation of video game consoles and providing competition to industry competitor Nintendo's popular Donkey Kong Country video game. In subsequent decades, the game was re-released across many Sega-themed video game compilations, and on its own across the Wii Virtual Console, Steam, Sega Forever, and Nintendo Classics digital platforms. A sequel, Vectorman 2, was released in 1996, but despite several abandoned attempts at making a Vectorman 3, no further games have been released.

== Gameplay ==
Gameplay screenshot

The game plays as a 2D action platformer. The player maneuvers the main character, Vectorman through levels by running and jumping, and attacking enemies through projectile attacks, similar to games such as Gunstar Heroes, Contra, and Mega Man. The game consists of 16 levels. The goal is generally to traverse from point A to point B in a level within the time limit, though levels are large and open-ended, offering multiple different paths to be taken to complete it. By default, Vectorman is equipped with the ability to shoot out "laser pulses" in eight main directions. A large emphasis is put on item collection. Collecting powerups throughout levels allow him to change weapons, such as drills or bombs that can attack enemies or alter terrain. Collecting "multipliers" may also be collected to increase damage dealt by attacks; for example, collecting a 2X multiplier leads attacks to cause double the damage. Other powerups allow Vectorman to change forms and alter his means of maneuvering through levels; a helicopter form allows him to fly, while a vehicular-shaped transformation give him extra speed. A life bar of four orbs monitors Vectorman's health; taking damage from enemies or harmful terrains lowers health, while collecting "health orbs" restore it. If all health is lost, a life is lost and progress through the level is reset, causing the player to start over. The game allows for the switching to an easier difficulty level upon the failure of a level, at no cost to the player other than berating them with a message calling them "lame".

== Plot ==
The game takes place in a future where the Earth has been largely destroyed by humans through pollution. Humanity temporarily migrates to distant outerspace while they leave "orbots" - a portmanteau of "orbs" and "robots" - to clean up the planet while they're away. Raster, one of the higher-level supervisory robots, is accidentally connected to a nuclear warhead missile, which radically alters his behavior, transforming him into a tyrannical overlord. Now known by the name "WarHead", he gains control of all robots and plans to declare war on humanity upon their return. One robot, Vectorman, had been off on a mission in outerspace, does not fall under his control, and upon seeing what is happening, decides to put a stop to Warhead's plans.

== Development and release ==
BlueSky Software's development relationship with Sega began in the early 1990s. After successfully developing and releasing Starflight and Joe Montana Football in 1991, BlueSky Software signed an exclusivity contract to develop video games for their Sega Genesis platform. Sega won the bid for the rights to develop the official video game adaption of the film Jurassic Park, and chose BlueSky Software as the primary developer. Sega published two of their Jurassic Park games; a video game adaption of the original Jurassic Park film released in 1993, and a sequel game, Jurassic Park: Rampage Edition, the following year, both for the Sega Genesis. After completion of the two games, Sega turned to them to create a game centered around pre-rendered 3D models in its levels and character designs, as an answer to Nintendo's popular 1994 release Donkey Kong Country. Vectorman originally started as a 3D tech demo created by tools programmer Karl Robillard, inspired by vector ball demos for the Amiga. While Sega had been finding success with the Genesis platform in the early 1990s, by 1995, they had lost momentum; Donkey Kong Country was a huge hit, while the launches of the 32X and the Sega Saturn had not gone well. Different branches of Sega had different views of how to proceed; Sega of Japan preferred to emphasize development on the Saturn, while North America, who had seen far more success with the Genesis, desired to focus on developing for the large Genesis userbase, with Vectorman scheduled to be one of its major titles for 1995.

The game featured a relatively smooth and quick development cycle because of their extensive experience of developing games for the Genesis. Vectorman introduced the Genesis programming technique referred to by Sega as "Vector Piece Animation". It was used to blend animations smoothly together, and also enabled the game to run at 60 frames per second. Rather than the typical singular character sprite, Vectorman's body consists of 23 individual sprites programmed to move in unison. According to designer Rich Karpp, Sega had very little involvement with the game until the end of development. Many ideas were tweaked and changed over the course of development. An early concept featured a character initially named Shakespeare and environments inspired by theatrical settings, before the team developed the concept that became Vectorman. Initially all characters were composed entirely of spheres, but as development progressed, the designers ended up using other shapes for the characters as well, feeling the characters were too abstract, and lacked recognizable forms without it. The "sphere-only" character approach characters would have allowed for more varied perspectives and scaling, including the changing of viewpoints, but this was eliminated upon the creation of more detailed character models. With the emphasis on smooth animations, the team had worked on the idea of having more "windup" and "aiming" type animations while shooting, but the added delay in action from the extra animations hampered the game's playability, and the idea was scrapped. Vectorman's character model went through many changes as well, and was not finalized until late into development. The game's villain, Warhead, was originally named Raster; the dynamic of Vectorman versus Raster would have mirrored how vector graphics are the opposite of raster graphics. At least one stage was cut during development, in which Vectorman rode a horizontally aligned wicker rocket on a track, with scrolling columns used to make the rocket rotate rather than simply follow a straight path. Karpp said that the level had a unique look but was not fun to play because Vectorman could not freely explore and the lack of room to maneuver made it difficult to line up shots at flying enemies. For the moving flags on the first level, the team referenced video footage of the flags on top of BlueSky's building during a windy day to make the animation look believable.

The game's music was composed by Jon Holland, a musician and filmmaker who was relatively new to video game soundtrack composing. The techno soundtrack was inspired by the works of Kraftwerk, Orbital, and The Prodigy, as well as Goa mixes. Holland attempted to create a "rhythmic" and almost "danceable" electronic sound to the music, though he lamented that it was difficult to achieve the sound he was aiming for with the Genesis sound chip. The resulting soundtrack was described as "slower and moodier" than most platformer games from the 16-bit era. A year after the game's release, the game's soundtrack was released under the name Sega Tunes: Vectorman CD, featuring higher sound quality arrangements of the songs originally aimed for by Holland.

The game was released on the Sega Genesis on October 24, 1995 in North America, and in November 1995 in Europe, with a marketing budget of $12 million. The game did not release on the Genesis in Japan, and wasn't released at all until over five years later, when it was included on the PC Windows release of the Sega Smash Pack. The game wasn't released further until the mid-2000s, after Sega became a third-party video game developer, and the game appeared on a number of Sega-themed game compilations. It appeared on Sonic Gems Collection (2005), Sega Genesis Collection (2006), and Sonic's Ultimate Genesis Collection (2009). The game was also re-released on various digital download services, including the Wii Virtual Console in Japan and Europe in 2007, followed by North America in 2008, on Steam in 2010, and as part of the Sega Forever service in 2018. In 2019, the game was included on the Sega Genesis Mini console. The game was re-released for the Nintendo Classics service on November 27, 2024.

== Reception ==
Reception

Review scores
Publication	Score
Computer and Video Games	96/100
Electronic Gaming Monthly	8.5/10, 8.5/10, 7.5/10, 8.5/10
EP Daily	9/10
Game Informer	9/10
Game Players	90%
GameFan	92/100, 90/100, 90/100
GamesMaster	92/100
Hyper	79%
Mean Machines Sega	90/100
Coming Soon Magazine	4/5
Fusion	3.5/5
Sega Power	90%
Sega Pro	90%
Sega Saturn Magazine	90%
VideoGames	9/10

The game was a commercial success in the US, with it being one of the best-selling video games of the 1995 holiday season. Vectorman sold 500,000 copies in the US by the end of the year, making it among Sega's top selling games of the year, though short of Nintendo's concurrent holiday, Donkey Kong Country 2, which moved 900,000 copies. Much like Donkey Kong Country series of games on the SNES, Vectorman on the Genesis was seen as a successful effort to retain interest in aging 16-bit consoles at a time when consumer interest was increasingly moving towards more advanced technology. Publications noted that the game's graphic's were comparable to early-generation PlayStation 1 games being released around the same time period.

Video Games: The Ultimate Gaming Magazine gave the game a score of 9 out of 10, praising the graphics, describing the game variety and ingenuity as "nothing short of breathtaking", and concluding that "if developers keep on pumping stuff like this out, then it'll be a cold day in hell before 16-bit is dead and buried." GamePro gave it a rave review, stating that "your jaw will hang open in amazement at what Vectorman does with the 16-bit Genesis engine. This platform game comes on with great guns, a morphing hero, and diverse, well-detailed levels." They also praised the simple controls, advanced graphics, and sound effects, and scored it a 5/5 in graphics, control, and FunFactor and a 4.5/5 in sound. Both Electronic Gaming Monthly and GamePro awarded it Best Genesis Game of 1995. The four reviewers of Electronic Gaming Monthly unanimously praised the advanced graphics and animation, large levels with numerous hidden areas, strong audio, and ability to change into different forms.

In a retrospective by Hardcore Gaming 101, it was concluded that Vectorman was "...one of the Genesis' best hidden gems, a great platformer that, while having a few faults of its own, manages to aurally out-do Donkey Kong Country in almost everyway while staying unique and memorable to this day, with the titles commercial and critical success gracefully backing up such claims."

== Legacy ==
In 1996, a sequel, Vectorman 2 was released for the Sega Genesis. During the same year, Sega of America entered into a deal with Los Angeles-based Ideal Entertainment for the motion picture, television and merchandising rights to the first game, though no television or film ever entered development. Multiple attempts at making a Vectorman 3 were made in the late 1990s and early 2000s, though all were cancelled by Sega prior to release.
