= Joe Montana Football =

1990 video game

- North American Genesis box art
- Developers: BlueSky Software (MS, GG); Park Place Productions (Genesis, DOS)
- Publisher: Sega
- Series: Joe Montana Football
- Platforms: Master System, Game Gear, Sega Genesis, MS-DOS
- Release: Master System: NA: December 1990; EU: 1990; Genesis: NA: January 1991; EU: May 1991; Game Gear: NA: 1991; MS-DOS: NA: 1991
- Genre: Sports (American football)
- Modes: Single-player, multiplayer

Joe Montana Football is a 1990 American football video game published by Sega. While the game does feature Joe Montana as a playable character, Sega did not obtain licenses from either the National Football League or the National Football League Players Association (NFLPA), meaning no other players, nor any official team names, are used. It was the first of many Sega-published football games of the 1990s prior to moving into the NFL 2K branding in the 2000s.

== Gameplay ==
Similar to other football games of the time, the gameplay follows a slightly simplified version of standard American Football rules. Players have the option to play as different teams, as well as select number of players. Players also have the option to turn penalties on or off. Players may also play a normal game, a mode with a two-minute drill, and the Sega Bowl mode.

Though Joe Montana Football and John Madden Football were made by the same company, Madden had realistic plays and a full roster of 28 teams, while Montana was a more arcade-style game with only 16 teams and a simplified, passing-intensive offense.

== Development ==
Following the launch of the Genesis in the United States, Sega of America president and CEO Michael Katz planned to create a library of instantly-recognizable titles for the console by contracting with celebrities and athletes to produce games using their names and likenesses. As part of this, Sega signed a $1.7 million five-year contract with Joe Montana, despite concerns among the Japanese executives that the game would not earn enough to cover this cost.

Sega had previously developed two American football games for the Master System console, Great Football in 1987 and American Pro Football (Walter Payton Football) in 1989, the latter very well-received by critics at the time. Joe Montana Football was originally intended to be an update of Great Football.

Since Sega of America did not at the time have a large game production facility, they contracted with Mediagenic (Activision) to develop the game for November 1989. No one at Sega was aware of the turmoil inside Mediagenic at the time; despite five months of reports that development was proceeding on schedule, Katz discovered in September or October that the game was hardly begun. To have a football game for Christmas release, Sega would have to find an already-completed game that could be converted.

Sega approached Electronic Arts, developer of the Madden NFL series, and president Trip Hawkins, for help, suggesting that he cancel the upcoming Genesis version of Madden in order to work on the game. Hawkins agreed to help Sega but refused to cancel his company's game instead working on both projects. He intentionally made Montana a worse game than Madden, starting with the basic code for the former he removed the 3D field as well as cut down the number of plays from 113 to 13. According to Michael Knox a programmer on the game, most of the deliberate downgrading occurred after the company had already completed the game. Joe Montana Football missed the Christmas deadline and was released in January 1991, shortly after the Genesis version of John Madden Football.

== Reception ==
Reception

Review score
Publication	Score
Famitsu	7/10, 8/10, 7/10, 7/10 (GEN)

Four reviewers in Famitsu complimented the game for being a highly realistic and well-crafted football game. While two reviewers commented that it may be difficult to get into if you are not a fan of the sport, one of the reviewers still suggested to give it a try as it was just so well made.

Although not as successful as the Madden series, Joe Montana Football and the sequels helped establish the Genesis' reputation as the top platform for sports simulations and proved to Sega Enterprises that sports games could be worthwhile investments. Website Den of Geek would credit both series for helping Sega gain an edge over Nintendo writing "High school and college jocks who would normally be more likely to taunt someone who identified as a video game nerd suddenly found themselves playing for bragging rights on all-night sessions of Madden." The game sold 250,000 units.

== Legacy ==
Joe Montana Football was followed by four sequels, all developed by BlueSky Software instead of Park Place Productions: Joe Montana Football II: Sports Talk Football, NFL Sports Talk Football '93 Starring Joe Montana, NFL Football '94 Starring Joe Montana, and NFL '95. After the contract with Joe Montana ended in 1995, development on the sixth game in Sega's NFL series moved to Farsight Technologies and the franchise was rebranded as Prime Time NFL. In 2015, Damon Grow, CEO of Superstar Games, tweeted snippets of Joe Montana Football 16. Joe Montana subsequently released a screenshot of the game. At E3 the same year, Damon Grow revealed the game as "Joe Montana Football", a mobile game coming to iOS, followed by Android and PC.
