= The Amazing Spider-Man: Web of Fire =

1996 video game

- Developers: BlueSky Software; Zono
- Publisher: Sega
- Producers: Jerry Huber; Jerry Markota
- Programmers: Brian Belfield; Keith Freiheit
- Composers: Brian L. Schmidt; Sam Powell
- Series: Spider-Man
- Platform: 32X
- Release: NA: 1996
- Genre: Action-adventure
- Mode: Single-player

The Amazing Spider-Man: Web of Fire (Note: The title appears as Spider-Man: Web of Fire on the title screen.) is a 1996 action-adventure video game developed by BlueSky Software and Zono, and published by Sega for the 32X add-on. Based on the Marvel Comics superhero Spider-Man, it is inspired by the long-running comic book mythology and adaptations in other media. In the main storyline, the terrorist organization Hydra and the New Enforcers orchestrate a plot to shroud New York City under an electrical plasma grid, trapping its citizens. Spider-Man must confront each of the New Enforcers members, foil Hydra's plans, and save the city with the aid of Daredevil.

Headed by co-producers Jerry Huber and Jerry Markota, Spider-Man: Web of Fire was created by most of the same team that previously worked on several projects at BlueSky Software, such as Vectorman and its sequel. It was the last game released for the 32X in North America, as Sega discontinued support for the add-on and produced a limited number of copies of the game as a result. It was also the final Marvel Comics-licensed release by Sega until 2008's Iron Man.

== Gameplay ==
Gameplay screenshot.

The Amazing Spider-Man: Web of Fire is a side-scrolling action-adventure game where the players control Spider-Man through six stages as he goes up against the terrorist organization Hydra, who has taken all of New York City and its citizens as hostage by setting up generators that caused a giant electrical grid to appear over the location, and their hired hands the New Enforcers. The New Enforcers are each guarding the generators to make sure Hydra's plans go uninterrupted. The plot is explained through newspaper-styled cutscenes. At the end of the stages, Spider-Man must confront each member of the New Enforcers while destroying each generator in order to progress further. The bosses are Dragon Man, Eel, Thermite, Blitz and Super-Adaptoid. Vanisher also appears although he is not a boss. On the main menu, the player has access to the options menu, where various settings can be changed such as controls and difficulty level.

Spider-Man can jump, punch, kick, duck, crawl, climb certain walls, shoot webs to swing on and collect web fluid to shoot web projectiles against enemies, among other actions. Spider-Man can also get assistance from fellow superhero Daredevil by rescuing him in the first stage and collecting "DD" tokens scattered through the stages. Other items can also be picked up such as health packs to restore energy. Spider-Man has three lives at the beginning of the game and extra lives can be acquired along the way but once all lives are lost, the game is over, though the player has the choice to continue playing after dying.

== Development and release ==
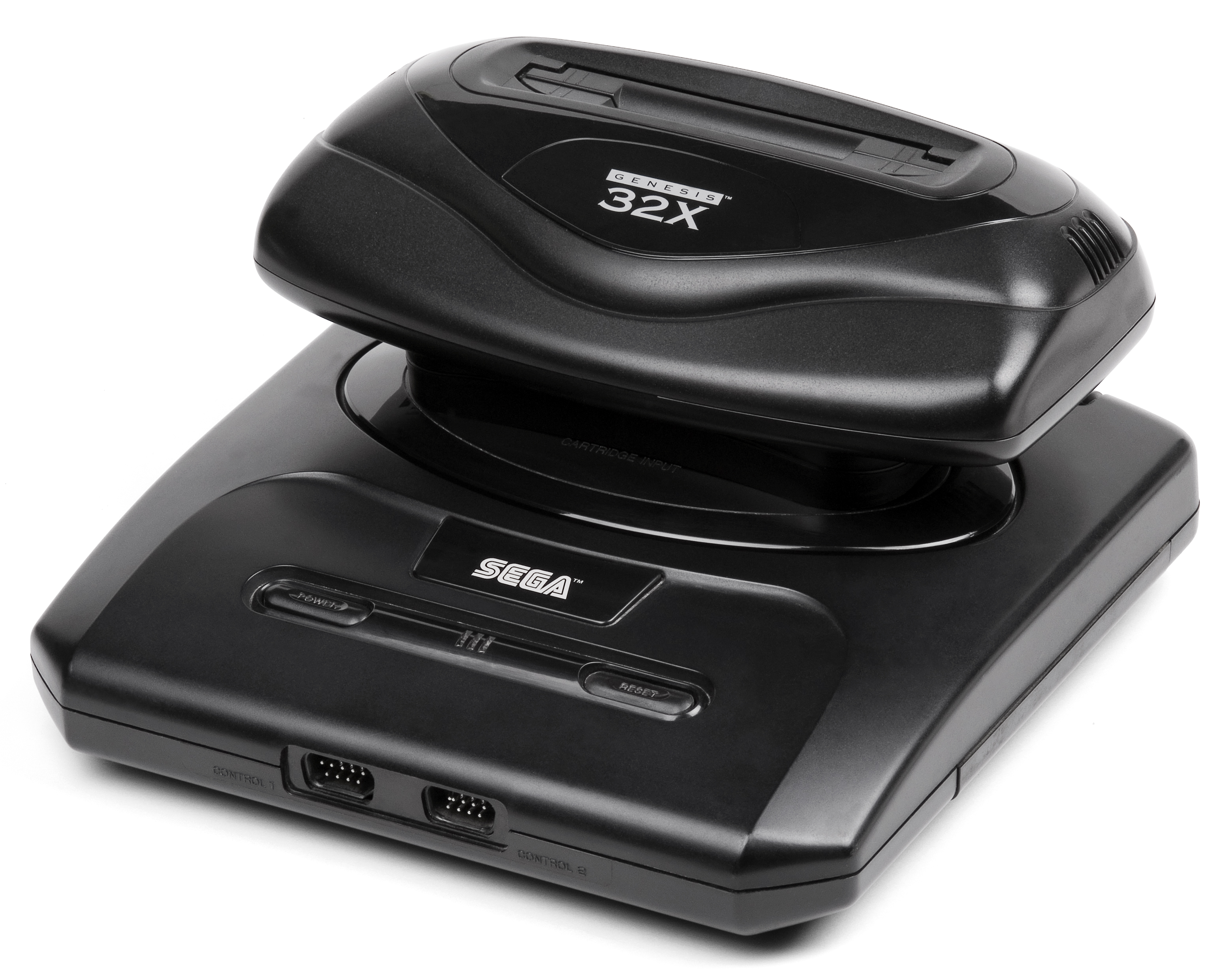
The Amazing Spider-Man: Web of Fire was the final game released by Sega for the 32X in North America.

The Amazing Spider-Man: Web of Fire was created by most of the same team that worked on previous projects at BlueSky Software such as Vectorman and its sequel. Its development was helmed by co-producers Jerry Huber and Jerry Markota, with Brian Belfield and Keith Freiheit acting as lead programmers. California-based developer Zono assisted with game design, while several artists were responsible for the pixel art. The character graphics were rendered on Silicon Graphics workstations, using motion captured animation based on storyboards from Marvel. The soundtrack was co-created by composers Brian L. Schmidt and Sam Powell.

Spider-Man: Web of Fire was released exclusively in North America by Sega in early 1996, after they had announced that they were dropping support for the system. It was the last game released for the 32X in the region, with an estimated production run of 1,500 copies. It has since become one of the more expensive titles on the platform due to its limited/late run, with authentic cartridges fetching over US$200-400 on the secondary video game collecting market. Complete in original package listings, ranging between US$1,099-1,700 by 2025. Prior to release, it was showcased at events like E3 1995.

== Reception and legacy ==
Reception

Review scores
Publication	Score
Game Informer	5/10
Game Players	36%
Manci Games	B+

The Amazing Spider-Man: Web of Fire was largely ignored by the gaming press, perhaps in part because it was released after Sega had already announced they were dropping support for the 32X; GamePro and Game Players gave it only brief reviews, while other gaming publications such as Electronic Gaming Monthly and Next Generation gave it no coverage at all beyond early previews. GamePro said the game was a "decent side-scrollin', web-slingin', thug-punchin' fun, featuring nimble sprites, lots of crawly moves, and fine graphical details. Spider-Man: Web of Fire won't disappoint Marvel fans, though it doesn't raise Spidey to the pantheon of great video game heroes." Roger Burchill of Game Players lambasted the game's lack of innovation, unimpressive and dated graphics, dull and formless music and repetitive sound design.

Spider-Man: Web of Fire served as the final Marvel Comics-licensed title published by Sega until Iron Man in 2008 for sixth and seventh generation consoles, due to internal issues between Sega and Marvel.
