= Ariel the Little Mermaid =

1992 video game

- Developer: BlueSky Software
- Publishers: WW: Sega; BR: Tec Toy (MS)
- Programmers: Barbara Michalec; Ronald Thompson; Karl Robillard (Note: This is for the Genesis version. It is unknown if they also composed for the other versions.)
- Composer: D'Cuckoo (Note: D'Cuckoo composed the Genesis music. It is unknown if they also composed for the other versions.)
- Series: The Little Mermaid
- Platforms: Sega Genesis, Game Gear, Master System
- Release: Genesis: WW: December 1992; Game Gear: WW: 1992; Master System: BR: 1992
- Genres: Action, Adventure
- Mode: Single-player

Disney's Ariel the Little Mermaid, usually shorted to simply Ariel the Little Mermaid, is a 1992 action-adventure video game developed by BlueSky Software and published by Sega for the Sega Genesis, Game Gear, and Master System. It is based on the 1989 Disney film The Little Mermaid.

Critically, Ariel the Little Mermaid was poorly received for its low difficulty and completion time, and was negatively compared to Ecco the Dolphin. A Master System version was released exclusively in Brazil by Tec Toy.

== Gameplay ==
In Ariel the Little Mermaid, the player controls either Ariel or King Triton in a similar way to Ecco the Dolphin (1992). In the game, their mission is to rid Ursula's spell on the Atlantica kingdom, which has turned the mermaid population into polyps. Depending on which character is chosen, Ariel will also have to save Triton from Ursula, or Triton vice versa. There are four stages, each requiring the player to collect polyps before fighting a boss. The first level is a reef maze with sharks, clams and eels as foes. The second is a sunken ship with sharks, ghosts and skeleton pirates inside and around it. The third is the remains of Atlantis where sentient statues shoot arrows and frisbees, and the last is a series of volcanic caves. Ariel kills enemies and ends the polyp spells by singing, whereas Triton shoots lightning balls to do so.

Ariel the Little Mermaid has three difficulty modes: Easy, Normal, and Challenging. The higher the level, the less money the player starts with, and the more time and effort it takes to get to the stage boss. On Easy, the level automatically transitions to the boss once all the friends are rescued. On Normal, the player can use a map but will have to find the boss area themselves, and on Challenging the map is absent. The player can be helped by three other characters. Sebastian scares away foes, Flounder moves rocks that otherwise make necessary areas inaccessible, and an original character named The Digger Fish looks for buried treasure. Throughout the stages are keys that open treasure chests containing money, extra lives, or health. Money is used to purchase power-ups and one of the tree fish characters Ariel is aided by at Scuttle's shop.

== Reception ==
Reception

Review scores
Publication	Score
AllGame	3.5/5
Aktueller Software Markt	6/12
Consoles +	SGG: 45% SMD: 43%
Computer and Video Games	46/100
GameZone	65/100
Jeuxvideo.com	6/20
Joypad	SGG: 73% SMD: 61%–77%
Mean Machines Sega	43/100
Player One	53%
Video Games (DE)	36%
Game Power	72%
Mega	44%
MegaTech	57/100
Mega Drive Advanced Gaming	61%
Play Time	40%
Sega Force	80%
Sega Power	SGG: 23% SMD: 18%
Sega Pro	SGG: 71% SMD: 79%
Ultimate Future Games	1/5

In her review of the Mega Drive version for Sega Pro, Les Ellis called Ariel the Little Mermaid the worst Disney video game and one of the worst video games ever made. Generally, critics unfavorably compared Ariel the Little Mermaid to Ecco the Dolphin, arguing that while the graphics were decent, the game was too easy, lacked gameplay variety, and could be completed in a very short amount of time. Play Time called the enemies' artificial intelligence "half dumb", and Mega's Paul Mellerick wrote that even the hardest part of the game, the bosses, only involved using attacks and taking a few hits.

Negative comments were also made about the controls, Paul of MegaTech dismissing them as "vague" and "irritating". Ellis and Mean Machines Sega journalists complained about the poor response time, critics from Consoles + found it not flexible enough to control the character, and Play Time condemned the playable characters' attacks as resulting in imprecise trajectories. Reviews from Mean Machines Sega and Aktueller Software Markt noted the jerky scrolling, and Consoles + journalist Alex considered the boss battles to be confusing. Play Times complained that levels were so large the map needed to be constantly viewed to figure out where the player character is.

However, some critics suggested Ariel the Little Mermaid may be enjoyed by very young players. In fact, Sega Pro's Jason Johnson and AllGame writer Christopher Michael Baker defended the game's low challenge level via its target demographic; Johnson suggested there were too many video game products in the market not suitable for young kids. Baker felt there were still hard moments, such as the bosses, getting chased by sharks, and dealing with a loss of control due to sea currents while enemies still pursue the player. However, Ellis thought young gamers would only like it for a short amount of time.

The visuals were not without censure. Consoles + critic Axel found them weaker than other Mega Drive titles; while praising Ariel's animations and the beautiful look of the levels, he felt there could've been more diversity between the stages in terms of visuals. Jason Johnson of Sega Pro also perceived a lack of distinction between the look of the enemies, although praised the sprite animation. Reviews from Aktueller Software Markt and Computer and Video Games were bored by the perceived uninteresting backgrounds and poor sprite work, particularly the "annoying" blue outline of Ariel's sprite. Coverage of the Game Gear version from Consoles + noted glitches in the information display during gameplay. In terms of renditions of songs from the film, Aktueller Software Markt described them as "beautiful", MegaTech called them "spot-on" and "impressive", while Mean Machines Sega found them too "plinkety-plankety" and non-reminiscent of the source material. Johnson positively commented on the Game Gear's upbeat music but criticized it for being repetitive.
