= Tournament Golf (1988 video game) =

1988 video game

- Publisher: Computer Sports Network
- Platform: MS-DOS
- Release: 1988
- Genre: Sports

Tournament Golf is a sports video game published in 1988 for MS-DOS by Computer Sports Network.

== Gameplay ==
Tournament Golf is a game in which using a modem, players could compete in a weekly simulated golf tournament held nationwide. It is played using Mean 18.

== Reception ==
David S. Stevens reviewed the game for Computer Gaming World, and stated that "For those tired of competing against just the computer, CSN can provide plenty of stiff competition on some of the world's most challenging golf courses. That is something that neither family, time, nor ability would allow us to experience in 'the real world.'"
