= NFL '98 =

1997 video game

- Cover art picturing Tim Brown
- Developers: Spectacular Games; FarSight Technologies
- Publisher: Sega
- Designers: Michael Brook; Dan Brook
- Artist: Douglas Wike
- Series: Sega Sports' NFL
- Platform: Sega Genesis
- Release: NA: 1997
- Genre: Sports
- Modes: Single-player, multiplayer

NFL '98 is a sports video game released for the Sega Genesis in 1997. Future Sega football titles would fall under the NFL 2K branding.

Like Sega's previous two NFL releases (NFL '95 and NFL '97), NFL '98 was released exclusively for the North American market. It was not only the last American football video game for the Sega Genesis, but it was one of the last sports games released for a 16-bit console. The game runs under a modified engine of Prime Time NFL with updated 96-97 rosters.

In July 1997, Joe Montana filed a $5 million lawsuit against Sega, claiming that Sega breached his license agreement in regard to the game.

== Reception ==
Released after Sega had discontinued the Genesis, NFL '98 was one of the last games for the system and was largely ignored by critics. A brief review in GamePro was dismal, stating that "Although loaded with sharp features, like customization menus and stat tracking, the gameplay, graphics, and sound are disappointing. Players are clumsily animated, and it's easy to lose track of the ball when it's in the air—this game's almost too painful to play." They gave it a 3.0 out of 5 in control and a 2.0 in every other category (graphics, sound, and fun factor).
