= Zono =

American video game developer

Zono Inc.
- Company type: Subsidiary
- Industry: Video games
- Founded: July 25, 1991; 34 years ago in Costa Mesa, California, U.S.
- Founders: Ed Zobrist; William Novak
- Defunct: December 2007
- Headquarters: El Segundo, California, U.S.
- Products: Metal Fatigue; Mr. Bones
- Parent: MumboJumbo (2005–2007)

Zono Inc. was an American video game developer based in El Segundo, California. The company was founded on July 25, 1991, by Ed Zobrist and William Novak, originally located in Costa Mesa, California. They are best known for their 2000 real-time strategy game Metal Fatigue.

In 2005, Zono was acquired by MumboJumbo and renamed MumboJumbo LA. In 2007, the company was moved to El Segundo, California. In December 2007, MumboJumbo closed MumboJumbo LA and terminated all employees.

== Games ==
Year	Title	Platform(s)	Publisher(s)	Note(s)
1993	Technoclash	Sega Genesis	Electronic Arts	
1996	Mr. Bones	Sega Saturn	Sega	
1996	The Amazing Spider-Man: Web of Fire	32X	Sega	Co-developer with BlueSky Software
1998	Freak Boy	Nintendo 64	Virgin Interactive	Cancelled in 1998
2000	Metal Fatigue	Microsoft Windows	TalonSoft, Psygnosis	
2003	Aliens Versus Predator: Extinction	PlayStation 2, Xbox	Electronic Arts	
2003	The History Channel: Crusades – Quest for Power	Microsoft Windows	Activision Value	
2004	Everest	Microsoft Windows	Activision Value	
2004	Riot Police	Microsoft Windows	Activision Value	
2004	Battle for Troy	Microsoft Windows	ValuSoft	
2004	The History Channel: Alamo – Fight for Independence	Microsoft Windows	Activision Value	
2004	Forgotten Realms: Demon Stone	Microsoft Windows	Atari	Port
2006	Platypus	PlayStation Portable	MumboJumbo	Port
2007	7 Wonders of the Ancient World	Nintendo DS, PlayStation Portable	MumboJumbo	Ports
