= NFL Sports Talk Football '93 Starring Joe Montana =

1992 video game

- European cover art
- Developer: BlueSky Software
- Publisher: Sega
- Series: Joe Montana Football
- Platform: Sega Mega Drive/Genesis
- Release: NA: 1992; PAL: November 19, 1992
- Genre: Sports (American football)
- Modes: Single-player; Two players (Versus or co-op)

NFL Sports Talk Football '93 Starring Joe Montana is an American football-themed video game featuring Joe Montana, released in 1992. It is the third in the series, and the first to be licensed by the National Football League (NFL).

== Overview ==
- Being officially licensed by both the NFL and NFLPA allows this game to use all the real NFL team names, and the trademarked phrase "Super Bowl", where previously teams only represented cities, and played for the 'Sega Bowl'; all of the league's (then) 28 teams, in addition to all of the league's players and their attributes from the 1992 season are featured.
- Joe Montana is the only player whose name is spoken; the following year's NFL Football '94 Starring Joe Montana game also featured Troy Aikman, perhaps due to his leading the Dallas Cowboys to Super Bowl success in 1993 (and 1994).
- Players may choose to play an exhibition game, or compete in the league (16 games, then the playoffs and Super Bowl).

=== Features ===
- Running commentary using 'Sports Talk 2.0' technology, which was highly regarded at the time, having around 500 different phrases uttered by Lon Simmons
- A 'playbook' containing 50 possible plays
- Four possible views of the field:
  - Horizontal. (on the sidelines)
  - From the blimp. (above field)
  - Behind the defense.
  - Behind the offense.
- Camera zooms in when a player crosses the line of scrimmage, or the ball is thrown by the quarterback
- Choice of:
  - 20-, 40- or 60-minute-long (full-length) games. Either way, they are divided into four quarters that are either 5, 10, or 15 minutes long.
  - Fair, rainy or snowy weather
  - Natural turf, artificial turf or domed stadium
- League play could be saved, and continued later by entering a ten-character code.
