= Cel Damage =

2001 video game

- Developers: Pseudo Interactive; Finish Line Games (HD)
- Publishers: Electronic Arts; Play It (Overdrive); Finish Line Games (HD)
- Designer: Kevin Barrett
- Composer: Egg Plant Productions
- Platforms: Xbox; GameCube; Cel Damage Overdrive; PlayStation 2; Cel Damage HD; PlayStation 3; PlayStation 4; PlayStation Vita; Xbox One; Nintendo Switch
- Release: Xbox: NA: 15 November 2001; EU: 3 May 2002; GameCube: NA: 7 January 2002; EU: 3 May 2002; PlayStation 2: EU: May 2003; PlayStation 3, PlayStation 4, PlayStation Vita: NA: 22 April 2014; PAL: 14 May 2014; Xbox One: WW: 11 March 2016; Nintendo Switch: WW: 28 March 2019
- Genre: Vehicular combat
- Modes: Single-player, multiplayer

Cel Damage is a vehicular combat video game developed by Pseudo Interactive, originally for the Xbox in November 2001 before being ported to the GameCube in 2002 and an enhanced PlayStation 2 port that was released exclusively in Europe in 2003. A high-definition remaster, developed and published by Finish Line Games, titled Cel Damage HD, was released for PlayStation 3, PlayStation 4 and PlayStation Vita on 22 April 2014 in North America and 14 May 2014 in the PAL region. An Xbox One port followed worldwide, via the Xbox Games Store, on 11 March 2016. A Nintendo Switch port was released via the Nintendo eShop on 28 March 2019.

The game takes a cartoonish approach to the vehicular combat genre, with the story focusing on six cartoon characters from a fictional show called "Cel Damage". The characters annihilate each other to the delight of TV audiences and, since they are cartoons, instantly regenerate. The player battles through 12 different levels and three game modes. Weaponry for Cel Damage includes cartoon staples like vacuum nozzles and portable holes, mundane weaponry like chainsaws and baseball bats, and items like freeze rays, giant springs, and portable nuclear devices.

== Gameplay ==
Cel Damage is a vehicle shooter in which players compete against one another using weapons to either gain smack points or stop other opponents from achieving their goal, depending on the game mode. Weapons include black holes, boxing gloves, grenades, chainsaws, baseball bats, chain guns, axes, and freeze rays. The three game modes are Smack Attack, in which players attack other players and/or computer players to gain a certain number of points first; Gate Relay, in which players race to checkpoints; and Flag Rally, in which players race to collect flags. Smack Attack is the only mode not initially locked (except in the PlayStation 2 version). Additional characters and areas are also unlockable in the game. The HD re-release in 2014 contained small differences from the original such as including health bars and altering the method to unlock certain items but otherwise contains the same content with a few new weapons and a new stage.

Cel Damage features ten characters, six of whom are immediately available to play as at the beginning of the game. The other four are referred to as "guest star" characters and have to be unlocked.

== Plot ==
In the game, Cel Damage is a popular animated demolition derby series that airs weekly on the fictional network "'Toon T.V." The characters in Cel Damage are a select few of cartoon characters who battle every week to achieve fame and glory. The characters use their own vehicles and battle using a variety of deadly weapons. Because the characters in Cel Damage are cartoons, they cannot be killed and can continuously come back to fight again.

== Development ==
The Cel Damage graphics engine uses a rendering technique called cel shading to produce this cartoon-like appearance. Furthermore, the physics engine in Cel Damage is unique. Rather than aiming to simulate realistic real-world physics, it emulates complex cartoon physics; the physics engine calculates the relevant parts of physical interaction as they would in reality, and then distorts the physical laws to produce a cartoon-like interaction. This can be seen, for example, when a car turns and the entire shape of the car deforms and flexes into the turning direction. Cars and game objects can realistically be sliced into pieces, flattened, frozen, shattered, shredded, impaled, lit on fire (and subsequently burn to a crisp and fall into ashes), and more. Chris Hecker, editor of Game Developer, described Cel Damage's cartoon-style graphics as "state-of-the-art for computer-game physics".

The game was originally announced as an Xbox exclusive at E3 2001, and would release as a launch title for the system. In October, Electronic Arts announced that the game would also be released for the GameCube and would follow along in December. The GameCube version would be a straight port of the Xbox version with some engine adjustments to take advantage of the console's hardware.

=== Release ===
The game was first released in North America as a launch title for the Xbox on 15 November 2001, while the GameCube version was released a few weeks later, on 7 January 2002. In Europe, both versions were released on 3 May 2002, with the GameCube version among the system's launch titles.

An enhanced PlayStation 2 port titled Cel Damage Overdrive was released exclusively in Europe in May 2003. It was released by Play It, a then newly-formed division of British game developer System 3 that focused on releasing "new, previously unreleased titles" for the system at budget prices. It formed as one of four titles initially released under the brand.

== Reception ==
Reception

Aggregate scores
Aggregator	Score				
Aggregator	GameCube	PS Vita	PS2	PS4	Xbox
GameRankings	64%	60%	51%	59%	66%
Metacritic	67 / 100	58 / 100	N/A	58 / 100	65 / 100

Review scores
Publication	Score				
Publication	GameCube	PS Vita	PS2	PS4	Xbox
AllGame	N/A	N/A	N/A	N/A	2.5/5
Electronic Gaming Monthly	N/A	N/A	N/A	N/A	7.67 / 10
Eurogamer	N/A	N/A	5 / 10	N/A	N/A
Game Informer	5 / 10	N/A	N/A	N/A	5 / 10
GamePro	4/5	N/A	N/A	N/A	4.5/5
GameRevolution	N/A	N/A	N/A	3/5	C−
GameSpot	5.7 / 10	N/A	N/A	N/A	5.7 / 10
GameSpy	60%	N/A	N/A	N/A	61%
GameZone	7.9 / 10	N/A	N/A	4.5 / 10	6.5 / 10
IGN	6.3 / 10	N/A	N/A	N/A	6.5 / 10
Next Generation	N/A	N/A	N/A	N/A	2/5
Nintendo Power	3.2 / 5	N/A	N/A	N/A	N/A
Official Xbox Magazine (US)	N/A	N/A	N/A	N/A	6.8 / 10

Cel Damage was generally praised for its cartoon graphics, but received "mixed or average reviews" on all platforms according to video game review aggregator Metacritic. Gerald Villoria of GameSpot called the Xbox version's visuals "impressive," and stated that the player "can easily think that [they are] playing a real-time cartoon". However, he added that some weapons in the game were far more useful than others, making the game a repetitive race to get the best weapon. Vincent Lopez of IGN said the cel shading in the same version "was one of the best examples of the effect on the market," but that the game play is too difficult due to both the computer players and the small arenas. Brian Davis of GameSpy praised the same version for its characters and maintaining its cartoon feel, but found that the game play was too short. Next Generation said of the same version, "Pseudo Interactive deserves credit for taking cel shading to the next level by adding truly cartoonish physics, but a great look doesn't make a great game. This is a real missed opportunity." Reviewing the Overdrive version, Tom Bramwell of Eurogamer praised the game's characteristic and art style, but criticised the simple gameplay and repetitive nature.

== Cancelled sequel ==
In 2002, Pseudo Interactive created an early prototype for a sequel to Cel Damage and pitched the project to Electronic Arts, Sega, Ubisoft, and Midway Games. The proposal was declined by each of the publishers it was offered to, due to the poor sales performance of the first game and concerns with the marketability of the property.
