= Pseudo Interactive =

Canadian video game developer

- Type: Private
- Industry: Video games
- Founded: 1995 (original); 2021
- Founders: David Wu, Rich Hilmer, and Daniel Posner
- Defunct: April 6, 2008; 18 years ago (original)
- Successor: Drinkbox Studios (original)
- Headquarters: Toronto, Ontario, Canada
- Key people: David Wu, Rich Hilmer, and Daniel Posner

Pseudo Interactive is a Canadian video game developer based in Toronto, formed in 1995 by David Wu, Rich Hilmer, and Daniel Posner. In 2006, the company had over fifty employees. After closing, several employees formed DrinkBox Studios. Pseudo Interactive was later revived in 2021.

== History ==
They released a launch title for the Xbox called Cel Damage, which was also released on the GameCube and PlayStation 2. They successfully pitched a full reboot of the Vectorman franchise to Sega for the PlayStation 2, but it was cancelled before release. They made Full Auto for the Xbox 360. Their final game was Full Auto 2: Battlelines, released for the PlayStation 3.

As of April 6, 2008, it was announced that the company was shutting down. They were working on Crude Awakening for Eidos Interactive which was cancelled, leaving the company without the means to survive until securing another deal. It was widely believed to be an updated version of Carmageddon.

As of 2021, the company is developing an MMORTS.

On October 7, 2022, Pseudo Interactive co-founder David Wu died of diabetic shock at the age of 47. By the time of his death, he was the lead developer at Pseudo Interactive, which was revived in 2021.

== Video games ==
=== Released ===
Games developed by Pseudo Interactive
Year	Title	Platform(s)
2001	Cel Damage	Xbox, GameCube
2002	Cel Damage Overdrive	PlayStation 2
2004	Crash	Demos for Microsoft XNA
2006	Full Auto	Xbox 360
2006	Full Auto 2: Battlelines	PlayStation 3

=== Cancelled ===
- Vectorman (reboot)

At least four games were in development at Pseudo before the studio closure:

- Crude Awakening
- Prodigal
- Divided City
- Cel Damage 2

At the time of David Wu's passing, Pseudo Interactive had a new game in development:

- Conquest and Virtue
