= Vectorman 3 =

Cancelled video game

- Developers: BlueSky Software; VBlank; Pseudo Interactive
- Publisher: Sega
- Platforms: Saturn, Dreamcast, PlayStation 2
- Release: Cancelled
- Genres: Platform, third person shooter
- Mode: Single-player

Vectorman 3 is a cancelled third entry in Sega's Vectorman series of video games. At least three separate attempts have been made public: Vectorman 3/Vectorman Ultra for the Saturn, Vectorman Neo for the Dreamcast, and simply Vectorman, as a series reboot for the PlayStation 2. All three were rejected and cancelled by Sega, and no third entry has been released to date.

== Background and development ==
After a series of successfully developed games for the Sega Genesis video game console, developer BlueSky Software signed a contract directly with Sega to exclusively develop their next games for the platform. Sega tasked them with creating a game centered around pre-rendered 3D models that could act as a competitor to Nintendo's huge Donkey Kong Country (1994) game, and retain interest in aging 16-bit Genesis console at a time when consumer interest was gravitating towards more advanced technology of new technology of the 32-bit generation of video game consoles. The result was Vectorman (1995), which was seen as a critical and commercial success on both fronts. A sequel, Vectorman 2 (1996) was rushed to market within a year just prior to the end of the Genesis's lifespan. While Vectorman 2 was similarly praised for pushing the limits of the aging Genesis in a time where most other releases were low-effort licensed games at the end of the platform's lifecycle, it was generally viewed less positively than its predecessor, and struggled to commercially compete with the Donkey Kong Country sequels in the same way. Three efforts to create a third entry in the Vectorman series were attempted in the subsequent years.

=== Saturn and Dreamcast ===
The first attempt was for the Saturn, the successor of the Genesis. Sega, leading up to the Saturn's May 1995 North American launch, had shown their developers a preview of the Saturn hardware and its launch titles of Panzer Dragoon (1995) and Astal (1995). The demonstration inspired BlueSky Software members to create their own pitch for a Vectorman on the Saturn. The team created a detailed design document with visual sketches dubbed Vectorman 3 and Vectorman Ultra. However, by the time the team had completed Vectorman 2 and was ready to officially pitch the game to Sega, their contract for game development with Sega was terminated, completely stalling the project. While no official reason for the end of the relationship, Sega was struggling financially at the time, with the end of the Genesis lifespan, the commercial failure of the 32X add-on, and the slow launch of the Saturn. Concept art from the pitch later leaked onto the internet a decade later. Publications interpreted the concept art to be for a game that would have been a 2.5D side-scroller with a graphical style that borrowed from both prior games.

In 2000, when Sega had moved on to its next console, the Dreamcast, a number of members of BlueSky Software left to form their own company, VBlank. The team created their own proprietary game engine and reached out to Sega to see if there was interest in working together again. In response, Sega sent a list of their IPs they would be interested in reviving, which included Vectorman. VBlank proceeded to create a short playable demo named Vectorman Neo; it involved Vectorman exploring a new alien planet. However, Sega rejected the pitch, feeling Vectorman name lacked the name recognition by this point, and the project was completely halted.

=== PlayStation 2 ===
Various prototype screenshots of the cancelled PS2 Vectorman 3. Over the course of development, the game gradually underwent a shift in gameplay, leaning less into platform elements and becoming a darker third-person shooter game.

In early 2003, rumors arose that Sega was again expressing interest in reviving franchises from the Genesis era, Vectorman being one of the games in contention. In April 2003, Sega announced that a new Vectorman title was in development for the PlayStation 2, and would be revealed at E3 2003. The game was being developed by Pseudo Interactive, who had approached Sega in 2002 with a demo for reviving and reinventing Vectorman that originally played similarly to the game Smash TV. Sega was convinced by the demo, and commissioned them to make the game, with a loose release schedule of early 2004.

The game was debuted and presented at E3 as planned. The gameplay saw a transition away from 2D platforming in favor of being a 3D third person shooter. Over the creation of the demo, the platforming elements were slowly phased out, with a developer noting that they had landed on a ratio of "80% shooter, 20% platformer". The game's setting and graphics were overhauled to look much darker and more serious. The Vectorman character was completely redesigned; his earlier spherical design was originally considered, but eventually scrapped in favor of a more modern look akin to Master Chief, with his internal nickname even being "Vector Chief". Exploration was encouraged in the game's large levels, particularly through destructible environments, of which 80% of the environment was able to be destroyed by the player. Environments and enemies could be attacked with the collection of 15 obtainable weapons and 25 different upgrades. Enemies and objects could also be thrown.

A complex physics system was created to portray the destruction, alongside an advanced artificial intelligence system for the game's enemies, called "orbots". Orbots had dedicated routines to follow, but also reacted to the player, and their destruction of the environments. Some would only attack if the player decided to attack them first. The game's story was largely not revealed to the public; Vectorman was seen as taking on the evil orbot "Volt" and his army of robots on the alien planet of Gamma 6, but Sega requested that any specific plot points not be revealed at the expo. Many elements of the game and its direction were reportedly in flux leading up to the game's E3 reveal, and while the aspects shown were cemented as part of the plan moving forward, many aspects not shown were still to be decided on. The demo played at 30 frames per second, but the goal for the final game was 60. The ability to transform into different vehicles was mentioned by Sega reps at the expo, but was not yet implemented at the time.

The game's E3 appearance was generally well received by publications. Electronic Gaming Monthly noted excitement in its approach to the revival, likened the graphics to the Halo series, and the customization of weapons to the Ratchet and Clank series. A playable demo was reviewed by GameSpot, who came away impressed by the complexity of the games AI and physics engine. However, internally, the game was cancelled shortly after its E3 appearance as a result of company restructuring actions at Sega of Japan. With rumors of the game's cancellation starting to leak out, IGN reached out to Sega for comment on the game's status in November 2003, where Sega confirmed its cancellation, stating "Sega has decided not to continue with the Vectorman project at this time." Publications also suggested that the game's redesign of the Vectorman character was not well received, and was criticized for too closely resembling aspects of the Halo series of games.

== Impact and aftermath ==
None of the proposed Vectorman sequels ever released, and to date, no further attempts at a third Vectorman titles have been released or publicly pitched. The game's cancellations deeply damaged the respective development teams in the process. Both BlueSky Software and VBlank went out of business shortly following their rejected proposals for Sega platforms. Pseudo Interactive was crippled by its cancellation, as they were a small company focusing the entirety of their operations on the Vectorman project. The company narrowly avoided bankruptcy by signing a contract to work on the Microsoft XNA development tools, something that was aided in their development of Vectorman's advanced physics system, though they later went out of business in 2008. In 2023, a leak of internal Sega documents from 1997 showed a release schedule with a listing for a Vectorman 3 being scheduled for release for the Genesis and Game Gear in 1998; nothing else is known about this potential version of the game.
