= BlueSky Software =

American game developer

- Type: Subsidiary of Titus Software
- Industry: Video games
- Founded: 1988; 38 years ago
- Founder: George Kiss
- Defunct: 2001; 25 years ago
- Fate: Closed
- Headquarters: San Diego, California
- Products: Video games
- Parent: Independent (1988–1998); Titus Interactive (1998–2001)

BlueSky Software was an American video game developer based in San Diego, California. Founded in 1988, BlueSky was acquired by French publisher Titus Interactive in 1998, and remained active until its closure in March 2001 amid Titus' financial difficulties. The BlueSky trademark remained under Titus' ownership until their bankruptcy in 2004.

== Games ==
=== Atari 7800 ===
- Basketbrawl (1990)
- Mat Mania Challenge (1990)
- Mean 18 (1989)
- Motor Psycho (1990)
- Ninja Golf (1990)
- Scrapyard Dog (1990)
- Xenophobe (1989)

=== Atari Lynx ===
- Cyberball 2072 (1991)
- NFL Football (1992)
- Ninja Gaiden (1990)

=== Amiga ===
- Hare Raising Havoc (1991)
- PGA Tour Golf (1990)

=== Commodore 64 ===
- Arachnophobia (1991)
- Avoid the Noid (1989)

=== IBM PC compatibles ===
- Arachnophobia (1991)
- Assassin 2015 (1996)
- Goosebumps: Attack of the Mutant (1997)
- Hare Raising Havoc (1991)
- PC USA
- PC Globe (1990)
- Relativity (1998)
- Risk (1996)
- Total Control Football (1996)

=== Master System ===
- Ariel the Little Mermaid (1996)
- Dick Tracy (1991)
- Joe Montana Football (1991)

=== Game Gear ===
- Ariel the Little Mermaid (1992)
- Joe Montana Football (1991)
- NFL '95 (1995)

=== Sega Genesis ===
- Ariel the Little Mermaid (1992)
- College Football's National Championship (1994)
- College Football's National Championship II (1995)
- Desert Demolition Starring Road Runner and Wile E. Coyote (1995)
- Joe Montana Football II: Sports Talk Football (1991)
- Jurassic Park (1993)
- Jurassic Park: Rampage Edition (1994)
- NFL Sports Talk Football '93 Starring Joe Montana (1992)
- NFL Football '94 Starring Joe Montana (1993)
- The Ren & Stimpy Show Presents: Stimpy's Invention (1993)
- Shadowrun (1994)
- Starflight (1991)
- Technoclash (1993)
- Vectorman (1995)
- Vectorman 2 (1996)
- World Series Baseball (1994)
- World Series Baseball '95 (1995)
- World Series Baseball '96 (1996)
- World Series Baseball '98 (1997)

=== 32X ===
- Spider-Man: Web of Fire (1996)
- World Series Baseball Starring Deion Sanders (1995)

=== PlayStation ===
- KazMania (1997)
- Risk (1996)

=== Java applets ===
- Destroyer (2000)
- Flam (2000)
- Hole in one (2000)
- Power Grid (2000)
- Sky Battle (2000)

=== Unreleased ===
- Mat Mania Challenge (1989, Atari 8-bit)
- Xenophobe (1989, Atari 8-bit)
- Ninja Golf (1989, Atari 8-bit)
- Klax (1992, Atari 8-bit)
- Superman (2000, PlayStation)
- Vectorman 3 (Saturn)

== See also ==
- Titus Software
