= Full Auto =

2006 video game

- Developer: Pseudo Interactive
- Publisher: Sega
- Designers: John Harley; Miles Holmes
- Programmer: Jason Hasenbuhler
- Artists: Janice Hertel; D. Noel Keshwar
- Composer: Michelle Frey
- Platform: Xbox 360
- Release: EU: February 10, 2006; NA: February 14, 2006; AU: March 23, 2006
- Genres: Racing, vehicular combat
- Modes: Single player, multiplayer

Full Auto is a 2006 racing vehicular combat game for the Xbox 360 developed by Pseudo Interactive and published by Sega. It features destructible environments and (in certain races) a mode called "Unwreck" which rewinds time if the player makes a mistake and wants to try again.

The game received mixed to positive reviews. A sequel, Full Auto 2: Battlelines, was released for PlayStation 3 in 2006 and PlayStation Portable in 2007.

== Gameplay ==
=== Vehicles ===
In Full Auto, there are four vehicle classes. Each has its own abilities, strengths and weaknesses. There is Class A, which are faster, but have less durability than their counterparts. Class B is the middle class of vehicles having a fair amount of speed, and decent durability. Class C consists of slow, but highly durable vehicles. A fourth class, Class S, is home to the "ultimate" class where its vehicle is very powerful, fast and durable. Note that in online play all players, regardless of how far they have gotten in the career mode, have access to all vehicles in whatever class the host of the room determines. However, tuneable weapons are not permitted on Live play unless they are unlocked from the career mode.

=== Weapons ===
The weapons of Full Auto are mounted on the vehicles, and have unlimited ammunition, but require a cooldown period if fired too quickly. The weapons become active after approximately 10 seconds of racing into the game.

== Reception ==
Reception

Aggregate score
Aggregator	Score
Metacritic	70/100

Review scores
Publication	Score
Computer Games Magazine	3/5
Edge	6/10
Electronic Gaming Monthly	8.17/10
Eurogamer	6/10
Famitsu	(X360) 30/40; 27/40
Game Informer	7.5/10
GamePro	3.5/5
GameRevolution	C
GameSpot	6.5/10
GameSpy	3/5
GameTrailers	7/10
GameZone	7.3/10
IGN	7.1/10
Official Xbox Magazine (US)	5.5/10
The Sydney Morning Herald	2.5/5
The Times	4/5

The game received "average" reviews according to the review aggregation website Metacritic. In Japan, Famitsu gave it a score of 27 out of 40, while Famitsu X360 gave it a score of two eights and two sevens for a total of 30 out of 40.

Theo Wells of The Times gave the game four stars out of five, saying: "Graphically, the level of detail in the tracks is simply stunning compared with the scenery on Burnout, a reflection of the superiority of the new Xbox over the old." Michael Donahoe of Maxim similarly gave it four stars: "A variety of wheels and weaponry ensures there'll be loads of destruction, while the online option gives this gas-guzzler some extra mileage." However, Jason Hill of The Sydney Morning Herald gave it two-and-a-half stars out of five: "A big selection of different events suggests variety but the action soon becomes repetitive. Full Auto's main competitor, Burnout, offers significantly more diversity in its challenges."
