= NFL Football (1992 video game) =

- Developer: BlueSky Software
- Publisher: Atari Corporation
- Platform: Atari Lynx
- Release: NA: 1992; EU: 1992
- Genre: Sports
- Modes: Single-player, multiplayer

NFL Football is an American football video game for the Atari Lynx. It was developed by BlueSky Software, and published by Epyx in 1992.

== Gameplay ==
Gameplay screenshot.

The Lynx system is to be rotated for vertical orientation in the player's hands, with the display zooming in and out from an overhead perspective. For two-player mode, a computer opponent is available or two Lynx systems can be connected via a cable. The players can choose a team from either the AFC or the NFC. The game offers an extensive clipboard of plays and formations "designed by a real NFL coordinator".

== Development and release ==
It was officially licensed by the NFL.

== Reception ==
Reception

Review scores
Publication	Score
AllGame	1.5/5
Electronic Gaming Monthly	21/40
IGN	4.0/10
Joypad	88%
Joystick	90%
Power Play	62%
Video Games	59%
Zero	74/100

NFL Football on the Atari Lynx received overall negative reviews for being an incomplete game made of buggy software. Electronic Gaming Monthly had four reviewers of the game, rating it 4, 6, 5, and 6. Between them, they said the game lacks focus, and has a poor implementation with difficult player control and choppy graphics. Robert A. Jung scored it at 4 out of 10, summarizing that "It doesn't help if football games on other portable game systems are no more sophisticated than NFL Football. The bottom line is that this game is a futile exercise in boredom, and is certainly not fun to play nor worth the price asked for it."
