= NFL '95 =

1994 video game

- Cover art (Sega Genesis)
- Developers: Double Diamond Sports/FarSight Technologies (Genesis); BlueSky Software (Game Gear)
- Publisher: Sega
- Designer: Michael Brook
- Composer: Andy Armer
- Series: Joe Montana Football
- Platforms: Sega Genesis, Game Gear
- Release: NA: November 15, 1994
- Genre: Sports (American football)
- Modes: Single-player; Multiplayer (1-2 players)

NFL '95 is the sixth video game in the Joe Montana Football/NFL series. It is the last Sega football game to feature Joe Montana. Its sequel, Prime Time NFL Football, featured Deion Sanders.

== Summary ==
This video game is similar to the previous, NFL Football '94 Starring Joe Montana, except in this version, there is no play by play commentary. The rosters of the NFL teams are updated to reflect the 1994 NFL season, and there are more plays for the player's football team to perform on offense and defense. Once again, Joe Montana appears on the title screen.

Despite the updated rosters, the game is notable in that it still had Deion Sanders as a member of the Atlanta Falcons instead of the San Francisco 49ers, with whom Sanders signed as a free agent during the offseason. The 49ers went on to win Super Bowl XXIX in Sanders' only season with the team before signing with the rival Dallas Cowboys the following offseason.

The game featured free agency (which was introduced to the NFL a year prior to this game's release) and varied in-game music.

The game was followed by similar releases, Prime Time NFL, NFL '97 and NFL '98.

== Reception ==
Electronic Gaming Monthly's two sports game reviewers both hailed the game as potentially "the best football game of the year", citing new features such as the option to control the receiver. They gave it scores of 87% and 92%. GamePro hailed it as a strong contender with Madden '95 for the title of the Genesis's best football game, citing the use of both real teams and contemporary player rosters, the updating of stats during gameplay, and the realistically balanced gameplay. They concluded that while Madden '95 is better for quick games and arcade style-play, NFL '95 is the more realistic and detail-oriented game.

Next Generation reviewed the Genesis version of the game, rating it four stars out of five, and stated that "EA's John Madden Football still plays faster and harder, but the realism of NFL '95 makes the slightly slower gameplay tolerable and leaves NFL '95 a football fan must."
