= Arachnophobia (video game) =

1991 video game

- Cover art
- Developer: BlueSky Software
- Publisher: Disney Software
- Producer: David Mullich
- Platforms: Amiga, Amstrad CPC, Commodore 64, MS-DOS
- Release: Mid 1991
- Genre: Shoot 'em up
- Mode: Single-player

Arachnophobia is a video game based on the film of the same name. It was developed by BlueSky Software and published by Disney Software for the MS-DOS, Commodore 64, Amstrad CPC, and Amiga platforms.

== Plot ==
An extremely venomous spider has been accidentally brought from the Amazon rainforest to California and mates with a number of spider queens, creating a new crossbreed of venomous little spiders that kill people in one bite. The plague of spiders is spreading and killing people at a frightening rate. Bug-exterminator Delbert McClintock takes the liberty of going through California to clear seven towns of their infestations. After the successful cleansing, Dr. Atherton commissions Delbert to destroy the spiders in the jungle.

== Gameplay ==
The player has to kill all spiders in the towns of Canaima, Webster, Dudley, Elias, Buggley, Infes Station and Arachton. The game starts in the town screen, where the player has to navigate the exterminator van to an actively infested location. Once the location is reached, the gameplay switches to platform mode, where the player controls Delbert. Delbert is armed with a limited amount of bug spray and a few bug killing bombs. The spray gun can be aimed high, low and straight and a single well-aimed hit can instantly kill a spider. Delbert can change his spray gun to fire flames too, at the cost of more ammo. Bombs kill multiple spiders in a single room and do more damage to bosses than spray. If the player runs out of ammunition, Delbert must return to his van for a recharge, but an unfinished level will restart. In addition to killing spiders, Delbert also has to destroy the egg sac, which continuously spawns spiders when he gets close to it. If Delbert makes contact with a spider, the bite will damage him. Damage can be healed by picking up a first aid kit. If Delbert takes four bites he will die and the game will be over.

As the player progresses through the game, the locations get harder, with civilians in need of rescue, spiders on the ceiling, spiders that hide and ambush, spiders that jump and make moves difficult to anticipate and there will be tough queen spiders to deal with. When all seven towns are completed, Delbert goes to the final level in South America where he must destroy a few alpha spiders, which completes the game.
