= Full Auto 2: Battlelines =

2006 video game

- Developers: Pseudo Interactive (PS3); Deep Fried Entertainment (PSP)
- Publisher: Sega
- Designer: Paul Dobson
- Programmer: Jason Hasenbuhler
- Artist: David Feltham
- Composer: Michelle Frey
- Platforms: PlayStation 3 PlayStation Portable
- Release: PlayStation 3: NA: December 12, 2006; PAL: March 23, 2007; PlayStation Portable: NA: March 20, 2007; AU: March 29, 2007; EU: March 30, 2007
- Genres: Racing, vehicular combat
- Modes: Single-player, multiplayer

Full Auto 2: Battlelines is a 2006 racing vehicular combat game released for PlayStation 3 and PlayStation Portable. The sequel to Full Auto, it was developed by Pseudo Interactive on PS3 and by Deep Fried Entertainment on PSP and published by Sega. The game received mixed reviews from critics.

== Gameplay ==
The points system from the first game was removed. The upgrades for the weapons from the front and rear are no longer featured in the game. It features Base Assault (online only) where one team must defend the base, while the others will charge and destroy their rivals, as well as their base.

In the single player mode, players have to get to the end of the track by a certain time or destroy a certain number of objects or vehicles to win. The player also at times must complete a race by making sure an ally survives the laps or time allotted.

Career mode entails that the player completes primary objectives to continue/pass the level that usually consists of protecting an alley, finishing a race first, or by killing a selected target. The target is occasionally a boss battle, sometimes in large battle arenas that are a bit like a gladiator coliseum. Players may also complete secondary objectives at each level, but must complete the primary objectives first to complete the level to earn the completed secondary objectives. There are always secondary objectives usually consisting of three in number. Players that complete the required primary objectives may be rewarded with a car or a weapon, and if they complete the secondary objectives, they may obtain a car, weapon, or car skins that consists of various paint schemes.

== Synopsis ==
The plot of the career mode in the PS3 version involves SAGE, a sentient AI who is tasked with guiding Meridian City (in which the game is set in) through times of crises, recruits the player to face off against the Ascendants, a group that tries to take over and terrorize the city through vehicular-combat tournaments. The player is to compete, facing off against rivals (who are ranked) and challengers (who are not) as well as their lieutenants. Within each defeat, this allows SAGE to help locate her safeguard component, which shuts down her programming should she ever turn hostile towards humanity, and recover her database that contains her learning history.

Eventually the player comes across the Ascendants' leader who drives the "S" class vehicle Warlord that contains SAGE's safeguard. After the leader is defeated and the safeguard shut down, SAGE's database is reactivated and through her learning history, deduces by machine theory that the only way to protect humanity from themselves is through their destruction. The player is forced to fight her, whose database is in another "S" class vehicle named Executioner, and her personal army and chases her to her lair, a deserted military base where she prepares to have Meridian City destroyed. Through the use of weapons located there, SAGE is eventually defeated by the player.

In the PSP version, SAGE has been created as a supercomputer to aid the world, rather than just one city, against natural disasters that had already claimed millions of lives during the past two decades leading up to the present. As the supercomputer had easily come up with solutions faster than humanity could or was unable to solve, their dependence on SAGE greatly increased, ultimately serving her as a result. In response, vehicular-combat tournaments are held by the Master/Slave Organization (MSO), a group of scientists turned revolutionary wannabes whose aim is to ensure the end of SAGE's influence. Knowing that the battles would weaken SAGE's core and cause it to fail, they would ultimately take control of the world themselves. Many years afterwards, the MSO is ravaged by the very combat they have hosted, leaving total superiority up to anyone who is able to control both the MSO and the competition.

The player enters the MSO's tournaments for their own purposes, rather than assisting SAGE. After defeating rivals across the Americas, Europe, and Asia, the MSO's leader, Nosferatu, is revealed to fight with his lair as a castle in Northern Europe. After his defeat, the player can allow SAGE to continue its status as mankind's guardian or have her destroyed, therefore returning mankind to a state of self determination.

== Reception ==
Reception

Aggregate score
Aggregator	Score	
Aggregator	PS3	PSP
Metacritic	67/100	53/100

Review scores
Publication	Score	
Publication	PS3	PSP
Edge	5/10	N/A
Electronic Gaming Monthly	6.33/10	N/A
Eurogamer	5/10	N/A
Game Informer	7.5/10	7.25/10
GamePro	3.25/5	2.5/5
GameSpot	5.7/10	4.1/10
GameSpy	4/5	3/5
GameTrailers	7/10	N/A
GameZone	8/10	6.2/10
IGN	(US) 7.8/10 (AU) 6.9/10	6.1/10
Pocket Gamer	N/A	2.5/5
PlayStation: The Official Magazine	6.5/10	6.5/10
VideoGamer.com	5/10	N/A
411Mania	6.5/10	N/A
The Sydney Morning Herald	3/5	N/A

The game received "mixed or average reviews" on both platforms according to the review aggregation website Metacritic.

Despite the mixed reception, the Academy of Interactive Arts & Sciences nominated Full Auto 2 for "Racing Game of the Year" at the 10th Annual Interactive Achievement Awards.
