= Lon Simmons =

American sports announcer (1923–2015)

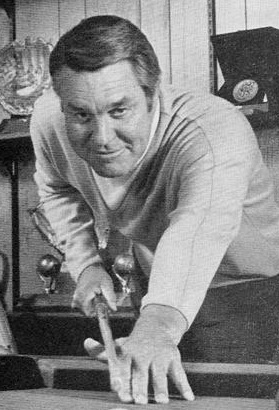
- Simmons in a KSFO advertisement in 1971
- Born: Lonnie Alexander Simmons; July 19, 1923; Vancouver, Washington, U.S.
- Died: April 5, 2015 (aged 91); Daly City, California, U.S.
- Education: Glendale College
- Sports commentary career
- Team(s): San Francisco Giants; San Francisco 49ers Oakland Athletics
- Genre: Play-by-play
- Sport(s): Major League Baseball; National Football League

Lonnie Alexander "Lon" Simmons (July 19, 1923 – April 5, 2015) was an American sports announcer, best known for his play-by-play broadcasts of San Francisco Giants baseball and San Francisco 49ers football.

He was born in Vancouver, Washington. Simmons was a star pitcher at Burbank High School and Glendale College before enlisting in the U.S. Coast Guard. After World War II, he signed with the Philadelphia Phillies and pitched briefly in their minor league system.

== Career ==
Simmons' radio career began in Elko, Nevada, calling Elko High School football and basketball games on KELK. He first announced baseball for a semipro league in Marysville, California. After spending three years broadcasting Fresno State sports on KMJ, Simmons came to San Francisco in 1957 as the sports director at KSFO. That year, he was the color commentator for the San Francisco 49ers of the National Football League, teaming with play-by-play announcer Bob Fouts, the father of Pro Football Hall of Fame quarterback Dan Fouts.

In 1958, Simmons took over as play-by-play announcer on 49ers radio broadcasts, paired with former 49er Gordy Soltau. Years later, he worked with KSFO disc-jockey Gene Nelson and then with former NFL player and KPIX-TV sports director Wayne Walker. Also in 1958, Simmons became the second announcer for the newly relocated San Francisco Giants of Major League Baseball, teaming with lead announcer Russ Hodges, who moved with the team from New York. To complement Hodges' "Bye Bye Baby!" home run call, Simmons created his own, "Tell It Goodbye!" When Hodges retired after the 1970 season (he died in April 1971), Simmons was promoted to lead announcer and teamed with Bill Thompson. This pairing lasted through the 1973 season. Al Michaels and Art Eckman became the Giants' radio announcers on KSFO in 1974.

=== Famed "wrong-way" football call ===
Simmons' most famous call during his first stint with the 49ers came on October 25, 1964, when Minnesota Vikings defensive end Jim Marshall picked up a fumble by the 49ers' Billy Kilmer and ran it the wrong way, scoring a safety for the 49ers instead of a touchdown for the Vikings (who won, 27–22). The transcript of his call, including his mid-sentence transition as the moment occurred, reads as:

(George) Mira, straight back to pass ... looking, now stops, throws ... completes it to (Billy) Kilmer up at the 30-yard line, Kilmer driving for the first down, loses the football ... it is picked up by Jim Marshall who is running the wrong way! Marshall is running the wrong way! And he's running it into the end zone the wrong way, thinks he has scored a touchdown! He has scored a safety! His teammates were running along the far side of the field, Russ (Hodges), trying to tell him go back!

=== Later career ===
Simmons returned to the Giants in 1976 as second announcer behind Michaels, then was the lead announcer again in 1977 and 1978, teaming with San Francisco native Joe Angel. When KSFO lost the Giants radio rights to rival KNBR in 1979, Simmons and Angel were replaced by Lindsey Nelson and Hank Greenwald. Three years later in 1981, KSFO acquired the Oakland Athletics' radio rights. Simmons then became an A's announcer, along with longtime Oakland Raiders and San Francisco/Golden State Warriors voice Bill King and youngster Wayne Hagin. Simmons remained part of the A's radio team through the 1995 season. From 1996 to 2002, he called Giants games part-time on KNBR. With the 49ers, he remained as play-by-play announcer through the 1980 season. In 1981, KSFO lost the 49ers radio rights to KCBS, who replaced him with its own sports director, longtime Stanford University play-by-play announcer Don Klein.

Simmons also served as the Warriors TV announcer on KTVU during the 1973–74 NBA season.

During the final two games of the 1989 World Series, Athletics lead announcer Bill King came down with laryngitis. Simmons was thus able to announce to his radio audience that the A's had won the World Series over Simmons' former team, the Giants.

During Simmons' first tenure as 49ers play-by-play announcer, the team never won an NFL championship. One year after his departure, San Francisco began a run of Super Bowl victories. When KGO acquired the 49ers radio rights in 1987, Simmons returned as the play-by-play announcer and was reunited with long-time colleague, Wayne Walker.

The following January, San Francisco won Super Bowl XXIII over the Cincinnati Bengals, 20–16. Simmons' call of the 49ers' Super Bowl game-winning drive (punctuated by a Joe Montana-to-John Taylor TD pass) can be heard on the NFL Films highlights package of the game. Simmons again departed from the 49ers — this time for good — during the 1989 preseason following a dispute with the KGO management. He was replaced in the play-by-play spot by Joe Starkey, the long-time announcer for the University of California Golden Bears and sideline reporter on 49ers games in 1987 and 1988; Starkey had taken over play-by-play on several October games during the 1988 season. Starkey retired from the position following the 2008 NFL season.

=== Coast Guard service ===
Simmons served in the U.S. Coast Guard for 3 1/2 years during World War II. He initially served on a cutter in Hawaii mostly conducting submarine patrols. During the Battle of Saipan, he served on a landing ship, tank (LST-205) that landed troops and supplies as part of the invasion. Afterwards, he served in the Aleutian Islands until the end of the war.

== Death ==
Simmons died on April 5, 2015, at his home in Daly City, California. Baseball Hall of Famer Willie Mays said at the time, "Lon was like my big brother. Anybody who knew him knew he was very genuine. He'd always tell you the truth. When I went into a slump, he was one of the guys I'd listen to. Just a nice man. He was always there for me in all kinds of situations. I'm really going to miss him."

== Honors ==
Simmons received the 2004 Ford C. Frick Award, given annually by the Baseball Hall of Fame to a broadcaster. He was elected to the Bay Area Radio Hall of Fame in 2006 as a member of the first class to be inducted. Also in 2006, he was inducted into the Glendale Community College Athletic Hall of Fame, along with his teammate, friend and broadcast partner, Bill Thompson. Simmons' trademark call for home runs, "Tell it goodbye!," is quoted by John Fogerty in his song, Centerfield.

In May 2006, Simmons rejoined the San Francisco Giants as a fill-in broadcaster. He was hired back to be in the booth during four in-season trips to San Francisco from his home in Maui for the 2006 baseball season.

The Giants radio booth at Oracle Park is named after him and Hodges. Both are honored at the ball park with displays depicting a microphone and their names, alongside those of the Giants National Baseball Hall of Fame player inductees. After Simmons' death in April 2015 the San Francisco Giants wore a "LON" patch for the 2015 Season on their jerseys to honor their longtime broadcaster.

== Other media ==
Simmons provided voice samples for Sega's Sports Talk video game series, including Sports Talk Baseball, Joe Montana II: Sports Talk Football, NFL Sports Talk Football '93, and NFL Football '94 Starring Joe Montana. Joe Montana II: Sports Talk Football was the first video game ever to feature a full play-by-play running commentary.
