= College Football's National Championship II =

1995 video game

- Developer(s): BlueSky Software
- Publisher(s): Sega
- Producer(s): Chris Smith
- Designer(s): Chuck Osieja; Mark Dobratz
- Programmer(s): Bryan Kiss
- Artist(s): Joe Shoopack; Mark Dobratz; Rick Randolph
- Writer(s): Carol Ann Hanshaw
- Composer(s): Sam Powell
- Platform(s): Sega Genesis
- Release: NA: 1995
- Genre(s): Sports
- Mode(s): Single-player, multiplayer

College Football's National Championship II is a video game developed by BlueSky Software and published by Sega for the Sega Genesis.

== Gameplay ==
College Football's National Championship II is an update of College Football's National Championship. This game added 5 new schools: Wisconsin, North Carolina, Colorado State, Oregon and Washington State.

== Reception ==
Next Generation reviewed the Genesis version of the game, rating it four stars out of five, and stated that "The way the camera zooms in close for runs or passes is smooth and it greatly enhances the gameplay. Still, EA's College Football USA and its 107 division IA teams have evened things up this year."

== Reviews ==
- Electronic Gaming Monthly (Feb, 1996)
- GamePro (Dec, 1995)
- Video Games & Computer Entertainment - Dec, 1995
- The Video Game Critic Nov 6th, 1999
