= Freak Boy =

Puzzle-platform game developed by Zono

Freak Boy is an unfinished puzzle-platform game developed by Zono for the Nintendo 64. Played from a third-person perspective, the game was planned to be published by Virgin Interactive. Announced in early 1996 under the name Stacker, the game saw two complete redesigns before finally being cancelled in late 1998. A playable early alpha build of the game was successfully fundraised and released online on June 28, 2020.

== Gameplay ==
Freak Boy, the main playable character, is a tall blue character, humanoid in shape, but composed of three disembodied parts: head, torso/arms, and legs. Each of these parts can eat objects to acquire an assortment of different powers. These powers can be used to apprehend enemies, or solve puzzles. There are 25 levels in total.

== Plot ==
On New Years Day, the planets align, allowing alien invaders called ZoS to take over the Solar System by extinguishing the Sun. The hero Freak Boy has to save the inhabitants of Earth by defeating the aliens using his super morphing powers, which allow him to take on the shape and properties of objects he absorbs.
