= Sports Talk Baseball =

1991 video game

- North American cover art
- Developer: Sega
- Publisher: Sega
- Platform: Sega Mega Drive/Genesis
- Release: JP: August 30, 1991; NA: 1992
- Genre: Traditional baseball simulation
- Modes: Single-player, multiplayer

Sports Talk Baseball, released in Japan as Pro Yakyū Super League '91 (プロ野球スーパーリーグ'９１), is a Mega Drive/Genesis baseball video game which features an official MLBPA license as well as most rules and aspects followed by Major League Baseball.

== Summary ==
Unlike real professional baseball however, the game ends when one team has 10 or more runs than the other team (win by domination, or "mercy" rule). Players can play either exhibition, regular season, all-star, or playoff games. It was one of the first video games to feature individual hitting abilities for each pitcher.

The most valuable (hitting) player in the game is Howard Johnson of the New York Mets. HoJo has the full capability in both running and hitting. He also has the ability to play infield and outfield.

It is considered to be one of the best baseball video games. Rant Sports rated it the eleventh best baseball video game in history. Stack rated the game as one of the top 10 video baseball games of all time. Bleacher Report rated Sports Talk Baseball as the twelfth best baseball video game of all time and referred to it as a "gem."

== Features ==
- Rosters updated for the 1992 season
- Statistics from the 1991 Major League Baseball season
- All-Star game rosters could be edited, allowing one to create their own team from players from both leagues, including the ability to have multiples of the same player
- Different batting stances
- Submarine-style pitchers

== Other information ==
=== Live play-by-play commentary ===
Sports Talk Baseball featured Sega's sports talk speech synthesis for running commentary of each in-game play. It was their second game to feature this technology (Joe Montana II: Sports Talk Football being the first). In order to produce the running commentary, Sega contracted sports announcer Lon Simmons as well as the vocal reproduction company Electronic Speech Systems to record the unique phrases and play calls for the game. Being that several simple phrases had already been recorded in the previous game, much of Joe Montana II: Sports Talk Football's running commentary was reused for Sports Talk Baseball.

=== Japanese version ===
Instead of a running commentary, Super League '91 uses a constant soundtrack of Japanese drums during the game and a remix of the umpire voices to a techno tune at the main menu. There is no way to see any advanced statistics other than at the end of the game in the Japanese version (i.e., errors and hits). All the players are shown using hiragana with English letters being used only to show field position and the status of the player.

=== Sonic the Hedgehog cameo ===
If the ball is hit far enough, a black-and-white picture of Sonic the Hedgehog can be seen on a billboard with his name below it.
