= Vectorman 2 =

1996 video game

- North American box art
- Developer: BlueSky Software
- Publisher: Sega
- Producers: Jerry Markota; Jerry Huber
- Designer: Keith R. Freiheit
- Composer: Jon Holland
- Platform: Sega Genesis
- Release: NA: November 7, 1996
- Genres: Action, platform
- Mode: Single-player

Vectorman 2 is a 1996 action-platform video game developed by BlueSky Software and published by Sega for the Sega Genesis. Released a year after the original Vectorman, the game retains the game's core gameplay while expanding its mechanics. Multiple attempts to create a Vectorman 3 were proposed to Sega, with none of them coming to fruition.

== Gameplay ==
Gameplay screenshot

The gameplay is similar to the first Vectorman game. The game plays as a 2D action platformer. The player maneuvers the main character, Vectorman through levels by running and jumping, and attacking enemies primarily through shooting projectile attacks. The game consists of 22 levels; more than the original game's 16, but levels in the game are generally shorter and smaller than ones found in the original. Like the original, Vectorman has a simple shooting mechanism by default that shoots in a straight line, but weapon upgrades that change and increase damage are collectable through levels. Vectorman may again morph into different forms with different abilities too, now done by defeating enemies; defeating a scorpion enemy will morph Vectorman into a scorpion and allows him to walk on particularly hot surfaces without taking damage, while defeating a rhinoceros beetle give Vectorman a large horned head he can ram into enemies. The game retains the same health system; a life bar made of orbs monitors Vectorman's health; taking damage lowers the number of orbs, while collecting "health orbs" restore it. If all health is lost before Vectorman can be directed to the end of a level, a life is lost and progress through the level is reset, causing the player to start over. Adjustable difficulties may be selected by the player as well.

== Story ==
After saving Earth in the previous game, Vectorman's spaceship is targeted and destroyed by a missile. Vectorman escapes and parachutes down to the planet, landing by an old research facility. While investigating the area, Vectorman finds aggressive and destructive mutant insects inhabiting the area. Vectorman takes it upon himself to explore and eliminate the mutant insects to save the planet. Unlike the post-apocalyptic setting of the first game, Vectorman traverse a wide range of modern settings until coming across the source infestation: the evil Black Widow Queen.

== Development ==
In the early 1990s, BlueSky Software, after a series of successfully developed games for the Sega Genesis video game console, Sega signed a contract with them to exclusively develop their next games for the platform. After a successful duo of Jurassic Park game adaptions, they were given a greater task; create a game centered around pre-rendered 3D models that could act as a competitor to Nintendo's huge Donkey Kong Country game, and retain interest in aging 16-bit consoles at a time when consumer interest was increasingly moving towards more advanced technology of new technology of the next generation of video game consoles. The end result was the game Vectorman, which was seen as a critical and commercial success on both fronts.

A sequel was immediately greenlit, though the game would feature a rushed development cycle; the lifespan of the Sega Genesis was already coming to an end by the time of the late 1995 release of the original Vectorman, and despite continued good sales, new releases were becoming increasingly rare in 1996. The original's main programmer, Richard Karp, was busy with other projects, and had to be replaced with Keith Freiheit, who had been a lead programmer on the first Jurassic Park game adaption. Similar to the series of Sonic the Hedgehog video games for the Sega Genesis, the game was developed by using the same game engine and the prior game, and building new content over it. Gameplay was kept very similar to the original, and levels made far shorter and less expansive than the original. Leaked prototype copies of the game showed many test and unfinished level designs not featured in the final game, along with an alternate unused "game over" screen. Development did branch out into some new areas though. While enemies in the first game tended to have a more robotic, metal feel, enemies in Vectorman 2 have more of an organic feel. Jon Holland also returned to compose the game's soundtrack, which ventured into a more varied electronic music sound.

The game was released on November 7, 1996, and prior to its release, the Sega Channel service held a contest that allowed artists to submit drawing of their own ideas for Vectorman "morphs", with the winner having their work. The judges then chose the best one to be transformed in Genesis art, as well as being put on the Sega Channel. Ten runner-up submitters won a copy of Vectorman 2. The game did not release on the Genesis in Japan, and was not released at all until over five years later, when it was included on the PC Windows release of the Sega Smash Pack. The game was not released further until the mid-2000s, after Sega became a third-party video game developer, and the game appeared on a number of Sega-themed game compilations. Vectorman 2 was released on Sonic Gems Collection (2005), Sega Genesis Collection (2006), Sonic's Ultimate Genesis Collection (2009), and the Sega Genesis Mini 2 (2022).

== Reception ==
Reception

Review scores
Publication	Score
Electronic Gaming Monthly	7.5/10, 8/10, 7/10, 6.5/10
EP Daily	9/10
Game Informer	8.5/10

While Vectorman 2 was generally praised as a game that pushed the limits of the Sega Genesis, and as one of the few games for the system was not a cheap licensed cash-in at the end of the platform's lifecycle, it was generally viewed less positively than its predecessor, and struggled to commercially compete with the Donkey Kong Country sequels in the same way. Electronic Gaming Monthly gave Vectorman 2 a 7.25 out of 10. Shawn Smith, Dan Hsu, and Crispin Boyer applauded its traditional side-scrolling gameplay, huge levels, graphics, and animation, especially on the bosses. Sushi-X, in contrast, said that the levels are surprisingly small, making it a disappointment compared to the first game. GamePro gave it a 4.5/5 in graphics and a 5/5 in every other category. The reviewer said that compared to the first game, it "has cleaner graphics, more sound and voice effects, and faster, smoother gameplay. Add to this spectacular and complex levels, and you have the makings of a Sega classic." Electronic Gaming Monthly awarded it Genesis Game of the Year.

== Abandoned sequels ==
Multiple attempts at making a Vectorman 3 were made in the late 1990s and early 2000s, though all were cancelled by Sega prior to release.
