= Jurassic Park: Rampage Edition =

1994 video game

- North American box art
- Developer: BlueSky Software
- Publisher: Sega
- Producer: Jerry Markota
- Programmers: Keith Freiheit; Kevin Baca
- Artists: John "Dok" Whitson; Dana Christianson
- Composer: Sam Powell
- Series: Jurassic Park
- Platform: Genesis
- Release: NA: October 1994; EU: November 1994
- Genres: Action, platform
- Mode: Single-player

Jurassic Park: Rampage Edition is a 1994 action platformer video game developed by BlueSky Software and published by Sega for the Sega Genesis. It is the sequel to Sega's previous Jurassic Park video game, based on the 1993 film of the same name and also released for the Genesis. Rampage Edition is a revamped version of its predecessor, featuring similar gameplay with several changes, and a new story that continues from where the previous game ended.

== Plot ==
After the events of Jurassic Park, Dr. Alan Grant escapes Isla Nublar on a helicopter. While the Costa Rican Army is blowing up parts of the island to destroy the park's dinosaurs, Grant spots a helicopter of armed InGen field agents arriving on the island. Fearing that the agents have plans to collect any remaining dinosaur eggs and DNA samples for a new dinosaur park, Grant attempts to contact the Costa Rican Army. Grant's helicopter crashes on the island after the pilot attempts to stop him. Grant survives the crash and must find a way to stop InGen.

== Gameplay ==
Gameplay is very similar to Sega's earlier Jurassic Park video game for the Sega Genesis. Like its predecessor, Rampage Edition is an action game with a platform setup that allows the player to choose between Dr. Grant or the Raptor. As Dr. Grant, the player starts out with a dart gun that has infinite ammo. A wide selection of weapons is available for the player to obtain throughout the game, including an assault rifle, shotgun, flame-thrower, grenades, rocket launcher, and shock rifle. As Dr. Grant, the player travels through the island while fighting InGen agents and dinosaurs until Grant can escape by boat.

As the Raptor, the player can win battles with physical attacks such as biting and whipping opponents with the Raptor's tail. A bonus for the Raptor is to collect enough Lysine crates, which allows the player to go into "Raptor Rage" mode where the screen turns red and the player becomes invincible for a limited amount of time. As the Raptor, the player can play all the same levels as Dr. Grant. The goal of the Raptor is to escape the island on a departing cargo boat to find a safe place to nest its eggs.

Candy bars and med kits are collected throughout the game to replenish the player's health, while eggs, embryo containers and DNA samples are collected throughout the game for points. Instead of the linear gameplay of the previous game, Rampage Edition allows players to choose from three levels to complete before they are allowed to proceed to the final levels in order to win the game. Unlike its predecessor, Rampage Edition features a faster pace, and allows Grant to perform additional actions such as riding dinosaurs and using zip-lines. Grant and the raptor are also able to kill their enemies, unlike the previous game. Rampage Edition also features larger levels, and more weapons for Grant to use.

== Development and release ==
Jurassic Park: Rampage Edition is a revamped version of Sega's previous Jurassic Park video game for the Sega Genesis, but was developed with a slightly different game engine. Sega chose to create the game after the financial success of the Jurassic Park film and its merchandise. A rafting level and an aviary were both based on scenes that were featured in Michael Crichton's 1990 novel Jurassic Park, on which the film is based; neither scene was included in the film adaptation.

Sega released the game in the United States in October 1994, to accompany the film's home video release. The game was released in Europe a month later. In 2023, Limited Run Games re-released the game as part of Jurassic Park: Classic Games Collection on Nintendo Switch, PlayStation 4, PlayStation 5, and Xbox Series X/S.

== Reception ==
Reception

Review scores
Publication	Score
Game Players	65%
Mean Machines Sega	59/100
Mega Fun	58%
Video Games (DE)	50%
Games World: The Magazine	35/100
Man!ac	40%
MegaZone	83%
Sega Power	70%
Video Games	8/10

Darrell Sasagawa of Game Players found that the game did little to improve upon its predecessor, although he praised the ability to choose levels. David Thompson of MegaZone called the game a "big improvement", praising the gameplay and graphics. Electronic Gaming Monthly also considered the graphics and controls an improvement from the previous game. GamePro considered the sound to be average and stated that the graphics lack realism: "All the characters look as if they've been outlined in black crayon, making the game more cartoony". Mean Machines Sega criticized its graphics, sound effects and music.

Brian and Britt Warner of Thomson News Service gave a mixed review of the game. Brian Warner gave the game an overall rating of 4 out of 5, and wrote: "The graphics were rather realistic and gory, but it sometimes got difficult to see other dinosaurs since most of the foregrounds were in greens and browns. The music was nothing to call home about, although I did like the screams of human victims as they fell to their death after a Raptor attack". Britt Warner gave the game 2 out of 5; he considered it to be oriented towards fighting action, and preferred the previous game for its action-adventure gameplay. Britt Warner felt that playing as the Raptor in Rampage Edition was more fun than playing as Grant because "close combat is more entertaining than just shooting everyone". Britt Warner criticized the graphics and background music, but praised the sound effects, especially the dinosaur roars.
