= D'Cuckoo =

D'Cuckoo was a women's multimedia ensemble of electronic percussion music formed in the mid-1980s by Tina Blaine, an ethnomusicologist and African drum expert, Candice Pacheco, electronic musician and acoustic marimba player, and Patti Clemens, former The Second City comedy trouper. Over time the size of the band ranged from 4 to 10 members, including Japanese ritual Taiko drummer Tina Phelps, keyboardist and sound designer Jennifer Hruska, vocalist Terrie Odabi, songwriter/multi-instrumentalist Tracy Blackman, and drummer Janelle Burdell. Virtual reality expert Linda Jacobson, D'Cuckoo's production manager, described them as a "neo-classical, post-industrial techno-tribal world funk ensemble".

== Music career ==
The group played an array of electronic marimbas and drums designed by the band along with the help of Silicon Valley engineers bringing in hi-tech Digital GFX and more. They were not exactly marimbas and drums: striking an instrument produces a musical sample, which may be a sample from a song.

A notable performance was at the Bridge Conference on Psychedelics at Stanford University in 1991; Psychedelic luminaries attending D'Cuckoo's performance included Timothy Leary. D'Cuckoo also composed music for the Peanuts special It's Spring Training, Charlie Brown (1992).

In 1992, the group cooperated with technologist Linda Jacobson, who assisted them with designing large interactive multimedia performances. In 1993, Jacobson was part of the ensemble as the voice of a computer-generated puppet.

The group's inventions include the MidiBall, a device for interactive musical participation. The MidiBall is an inflatable ball with sensors, so that when it is bouncing around the auditorium and touched by the audience, it produces sounds and images, and in addition, it sends the signals to the stage and alters the sounding of the music.

Another interactive tool they used was "Bliss Paint" invented by Greg Jalbert, which was essentially a screensaver program modified to be controlled by audience for changing the visual imagery of the performance.

== Discography ==
- 1991: D'Cuckoo (Aisle of Women Productions)
- 1994: Umoja (RGB Records) (the title means "Unity" in Swahili)
