= Jurassic Park (Genesis video game) =

1993 video game

- European cover art
- Developer: BlueSky Software
- Publisher: Sega
- Producer: Jesse Taylor
- Programmer: Keith Freiheit
- Artists: Doug TenNapel; Dana Christianson
- Composer: Sam Powell
- Series: Jurassic Park
- Platform: Genesis/Mega Drive
- Release: NA: August 10, 1993; EU: September 10, 1993
- Genres: Action-adventure, platform
- Mode: Single-player

Jurassic Park is a 1993 action-adventure game developed by BlueSky Software and published by Sega for the Sega Genesis. It was released as a tie-in with the 1993 film of the same name, and features elements from Michael Crichton's 1990 novel on which the film is based.

In 1994, after the financial success of the film and its merchandise, Sega released a sequel video game titled Jurassic Park: Rampage Edition. Both games were re-released in 2023 as part of Jurassic Park: Classic Games Collection.

== Gameplay ==
Gameplay as Dr. Grant (top), and as the Velociraptor (bottom).

Jurassic Park is a standard side-scrolling action game with platform elements. The end objective is to reach the end of each level, using items placed at fixed locations. However, the game features a then-uncommon variation in action games, giving players the option of using two characters that played independently to one another. The game is playable as either paleontologist Dr. Alan Grant, or a Velociraptor. Grant is the default character and can be switched to the Raptor using the "Player" option on the game's main menu. The game has three selectable difficulty levels: "Medium" is the default neutral setting while "Hard" means more damage taken from enemies (who move faster and attack frequently) and "Easy" mode makes for less troublesome foes from which relatively little damage is taken.

Each player is given three lives; when one is lost, the player restarts at the beginning of the level. A game over will reset the game entirely, although passwords are displayed in between levels, allowing the player to continue from a specific level rather than from the beginning. A Password option is displayed in the game's main menu.

When playing as Grant, his objective is to navigate through seven areas of Isla Nublar, and make it safely to the Visitors Center to escape via helicopter. He must contend with the various dinosaurs that roam the island, now free of their enclosures. Grant can use various weapons, including a tranquillizer gun, a stun gun, flash grenades, gas grenades, and a rocket launcher. All of these items require ammunition refills which are scattered throughout the island, sometimes in hard-to-reach places. Grant's recovery item is a first-aid kit, a few of which occur in each level.

The Velociraptor player character can jump higher than Grant, and run much faster, although it can only attack from close-range using its teeth and claws. The Raptor's goal is to elude (or eliminate) the Jurassic Park security guards, and corner Grant at the Visitors Center. The Raptor plays for only five levels. Along the way, stray dinosaurs can be bothersome for the Raptor, who can knock them out. The enemy guards wield grenades and missiles but can be easily overpowered by the Raptor, although the final level increases the guards' presence and temperament. The Raptor's health item is generic "meat", although it has the ability to eat a "compy" to refill its health as well.

== Development ==
Acclaim Entertainment and Activision had both bid for the rights to produce the Sega Genesis version of Jurassic Park, but lost to Sega. Doug TenNapel was the lead artist for the development team. The game's animators consulted experts who worked on the film on how the game's dinosaurs should look. The development team also consulted with paleontologist Robert Bakker, who dissected a supermarket chicken to demonstrate the similarities of dinosaur anatomy to bird anatomy. Bakker also appeared in a commercial for the game. For the game to reflect the latest dinosaur discoveries and theories, the development team took field trips to museums of natural history; and to zoos to observe the feeding habits and physical movements of birds and reptiles, such as ostriches and alligators.

Jurassic Park was the first game by Sega to be developed using Silicon Graphics computers at the company's new development facility; such computers were previously used to create computer-generated dinosaurs for the film. The 3D models for the game's dinosaurs were created using stop motion photography while a team member was filmed acting out Grant's movements and was then digitized. Many dinosaur models used for the film were sent to the game's development studio so they could also be filmed and digitized while in motion. A $75,000 Velociraptor puppet from the film was also used for production of the game. The game features "Artificial Dinosaur Intelligence" that causes the dinosaur enemies to react differently every time a level is played, giving the player a unique experience each time.

Elements from Michael Crichton's novel, Jurassic Park, were featured in the game, including the presence of procompsognathus and pteranodons, and the Jungle River attraction. The game used the film's original planned ending, in which Grant would eliminate the velociraptors by manipulating a Tyrannosaurus rex skeleton in the visitor center. The game's volcano level was not featured in the novel or the film. Sam Powell composed the game's music and sound effects. By June 1993, the development team had been working on the game for 15 months. The game's development had been kept secretive up until that month, when the game was publicly unveiled for the first time at Chicago's Summer Consumer Electronics Show. Jurassic Park was the first film-based video game to give players the option of playing as a protagonist or antagonist.

== Release ==
Jurassic Park was released in the United States on August 10, 1993, and was the first video game to utilize Sega's new ratings system, receiving a GA (General Audiences) rating.

In 2023, Limited Run Games re-released the game as part of Jurassic Park: Classic Games Collection on Nintendo Switch, PlayStation 4, PlayStation 5, and Xbox Series X/S. It includes updated features like save states and in-game maps. The 1994 sequel, Jurassic Park: Rampage Edition, is also included in the collection.

== Reception ==
Reception

Review scores
Publication	Score
AllGame	4.5/5
Computer and Video Games	65/100
Electronic Gaming Monthly	8/10
GameFan	48%-68%
GamePro	5/5
Joypad	85%
Player One	82%
Video Games (DE)	66%
Electronic Games	93%
Entertainment Weekly	B+
Man!ac	43%
Mega	64%
Mega Action	83%
Mega Force	80%
MegaTech	77/100
Sega Power	70%
Sega Pro	85%
Sega Zone	64/100
Video Games	7/10

Approximately 250,000 copies were sold within the first week of the game's U.S. release, totaling a record $13.8 million. In France, Sega France reported sales of 100,000 Jurassic Park cartridges by May 1994.

Rocky Mountain News wrote that the film "had all of the elements to make a video game classic. Too bad Sega didn't see that. In all of its 16-megabit, Spielberg-licensed, digitized, graphically detailed glory, the game still grates, bores and frustrates". William Schiffmann of the Associated Press favorably compared the game to Flashback, and called it "a winner", writing that "playing Jurassic Park is as much fun as seeing the movie—maybe better. Graphics are great, control is excellent and the sound, both music and effects, is perfect". Joel Easley of Scripps Howard News Service considered the game too hard, and criticized the background graphics, although he praised the "awesome" designs of the main characters and T. rex, as well as the "cool" ability to play as either Grant or the Velociraptor.

Pat Ferguson, a video game industry analyst, called the game's character choices "the great hook here", and stated that Sega "has combined all the best of 16-bit video games in Jurassic Park. The quality of the graphics is as good as it's going to get, and the sound is the highest quality I can recall in any video game". Bob Strauss of Entertainment Weekly called the game "a blast".

In a later review for AllGame, Christopher Michael Baker praised the graphics, the ability to play as either Grant or the Velociraptor, and the sound effects and intelligence of the game's dinosaurs. Baker concluded: "It's the type of game that – even though it is the product of movie merchandising – is fabulous on its own. A rare find indeed". In 2005, Morgan Webb of X-Play criticized the game as a poor movie tie-in and included it on the show's list of "Games We Wish Were Buried In New Mexico", referring to the Atari video game burial. Game Informer declared the Genesis version of Jurassic Park somewhat superior to the SNES version in a 2012 comparison of the two games. IGN also deemed it superior in 2019, for offering the ability to play as a raptor.

== See also ==
- List of Jurassic Park video games
