= Mr. Bones (video game) =

1996 video game

- North American cover art
- Developer: Zono
- Publisher: Sega
- Director: Jeff Fort
- Producer: Ed Zobrist
- Designers: Ed Annunziata; William Novak
- Programmers: Simon Hallam; Dave Castelnuovo
- Artists: Michael Gates; Jason Hough
- Writer: E. Ettore Annunziata
- Composers: Ronnie Montrose; Jim Hedges (in-game); Brian Coburn (Skeletism Generator)
- Platform: Sega Saturn
- Release: NA: October 18, 1996; EU: March 13, 1997; JP: June 26, 1997
- Genres: Platform; Rhythm; Minigame
- Mode: Single-player

Mr. Bones is a 1996 multi-genre video game conceptualized by Ed Annunziata, developed by Zono and published by Sega for the Sega Saturn. The soundtrack to Mr. Bones was composed and performed by Ronnie Montrose, with cutscenes and art assets done by Angel Studios. The player takes on the role of a reanimated skeleton working to prevent the magician who revived him from using his undead army to ravage the world. Much of the gameplay relies upon effectively managing "skeletal magnetism", the magic which holds Mr. Bones's reanimated body together, and the game allows and at times requires Mr. Bones to operate with less than a full skeleton.

The game met with divisive reviews, with some hailing it as strikingly original and others decrying it as a hackneyed and generic platformer.

== Story ==
DaGoulian, a mad philosopher who believes that one can only "ensure the survival of good by making evil thrive", sets out to purify the world with evil. By playing a special set of drums powered by science and alchemy, he is able to tap into a primal power which he calls "skeletal magnetism" (or "skeletism") and summon the dead from their graves as his skeletal soldiers.

One inmate of the cemetery, however, is pure of heart and is thus resurrected not with red (evil) skeletism, but with blue (good) skeletism. Because of this, he retains his free will. This fact is quickly noticed by DaGoulian, and he orders his newly created army to destroy this rebel, who calls himself simply "Mr. Bones."

Mr. Bones soon becomes determined to stop DaGoulian's plan. He must find a way to counteract the evil of red skeletism before DaGoulian's minions catch up to him.

== Gameplay ==
One of Mr. Bones' most distinctive qualities is in it having very few levels which share the same style of gameplay; with only a few exceptions, almost every level looks and feels different from the rest. Some levels simply change the camera perspective, while others offer up their own distinct genre. The most common thread running throughout the game is that of an action/platform game with slight gameplay and viewing angle variations per level, but at times the styles diverge far more drastically, ranging from a music/rhythm game to a Breakout-style game to a game of memorization. Once a level has been beaten, the player can return directly to that level from the main menu any time they choose.

In lieu of a normal health bar, Mr. Bones has a supply of skeletism. When his skeletism level drops, he gradually loses body parts, being reduced to just a skull and spine at his lowest levels. His lost body parts remain in play and can be reattached, though unless Mr. Bones regains skeletism the reattachment will be fragile and even landing from a significant height will cause the parts to fall off again. The game's physics also take Mr. Bones' state of completion into account; for example, if he has lost both legs he will crawl with his arms, and cannot run or jump. In most levels, Mr. Bones can shoot a beam from his hand which destroys enemies and restores his skeletism level. He can also restore skeletism by collecting blue items.

== Development ==
The cinematics were designed and directed by Allen Battino. Actor Fitz Houston was the original voice of Mr. Bones though other parts were revoiced over the years. Fitz Houston was also the vocalist in the song "In This World".

A playable demo of Mr. Bones was exhibited at the May 1996 Electronic Entertainment Expo.

The music was composed by musician Ronnie Montrose. This was part of a larger trend of established musicians in the late 1990s who composed music for video games, with other examples being Ian McDonald composing for Wachenröder and Stewart Copeland composing music for Spyro the Dragon.

== Reception ==
Reception

Aggregate score
Aggregator	Score
GameRankings	77% (4 reviews)

Review scores
Publication	Score
Electronic Gaming Monthly	8.5/10, 9/10, 9/10, 8/10
GameSpot	6.3/10
Next Generation	3/5
Sega Saturn Magazine	66%

Mr. Bones polarized reviewers, who sharply disagreed on whether the gameplay was bizarre and extraordinarily original, or mundane "hop n bop" platforming. GameSpot's Tom Ham gave it a modest score but a relentlessly positive review, applauding the unique stage designs, varying perspectives, title character, beautiful and eerie visual design, and blues-rock soundtrack. He summarized the game as "a cool, musically interactive, multi-level scroller that's surprisingly fun to play." The four reviewers of Electronic Gaming Monthly were also enthralled, with Dan Hsu summarizing, "Mr. Bones is completely unique – you can tell that some true geniuses worked on this project." Most of them commented that the different gameplay types in the many levels are consistently ingenious and fun, though Sushi-X said the gameplay is weak, and that it is the humorous and audio-visually stunning full-motion video cutscenes which make the game enjoyable. In contrast, GamePro completely panned the game, citing "unfinished graphics", unfairly difficult enemy AI, and "insipid hop-n-bop gameplay." They said the music is a positive point, but the spoken word background in "Glass Shards" is annoying. Next Generation commented that the concept of the game is refreshingly unusual but that most of the levels use "fairly average" side-scrolling gameplay which does not live up to the originality of the concept. They still concluded the game to be moderately appealing due to its humor and especially its massive length. Lee Nutter of the British Sega Saturn Magazine said that, due in part to its much delayed PAL conversion, Mr. Bones was outdated by the time of its release in the UK. He contended that the different gameplay types just make the game feel like a generic platformer with a lot of out-of-place mini-games. However, his main criticism was that the game is too distinctively American.

In a 2012 retrospective, French publication Jeuxvideo.com attributed Mr. Bones' relative obscurity partly to the Saturn's limited commercial success in the West and to the game's predominantly two-dimensional presentation, which was considered dated at the time of its release. The publication nevertheless described the game as innovative and deserving of rediscovery.
