= Technoclash =

1993 video game

- North American cover art
- Developers: Zono; BlueSky Software
- Publisher: Electronic Arts
- Producer: Richard Kippenhan III
- Designer: Novak
- Composer: Mark Miller
- Platform: Sega Genesis
- Release: NA/EU: August 1993
- Genres: Action, RPG
- Mode: Single-player

Technoclash is an action game with RPG elements published by Electronic Arts in 1993 for the Genesis.

== Story ==
A world populated by wizards is breached by the daemon "Engine Man", half-man and half-machine through an inter-dimensional portal. His arrival foretells the "Technoclash" - a war between technology and magic. Ronaan, the Wizard Prince is told by Abaris his wizard mentor to assemble a task force and journey through the portal to take the fight to Engine Man and defeat him before his armies invade the Inner Realm. Compounding their mission, Abaris' magical Life Staff has been stolen by Engine Man, and Ronaan discovers that the portal only permits one-way travel, effectively trapping them in Engine Man's world until he is defeated and the Life Staff recovered.

== Gameplay ==
At the beginning of each level, players choose the magic apprentice Chaz or the barbarian Farrg as their partner, each with their own abilities. The manual states that Farrg is better for the early levels, whereas Chaz is "the clear choice for bodyguard on later levels".

There are seven levels in the game. The first three imply that Engine Man's world is Earth - Las Vegas, junkyard, and the desert - and the next four levels are specific to the Machine Empire; The underground City, Portal Cavern, 'Tween Place, and Teg Temple.

== Reception ==
Reviews were generally favourable, but with specific criticisms. Common to most reviews was the feeling that the game was "a great idea that should be more refined to make it better". Electronic Gaming Monthly gave the game a 6.5 out of 10 considering it "a poor man's Gauntlet" and saying that while "the backgrounds are nicely detailed" it subsequently made it "hard to see the enemies". GamePro considered it to be "an above average technoblast" but felt that Ronaan moved too slowly in open areas, and didn't respond to the controls fast enough. Like other magazines, Sega Power summarised the game, saying it was a "mix of gaming genres which doesn't really go the full distance. The quality of the plot and the RPG bits raises it above the usual crude beat-em-up tat though".
