= Prime Time NFL =

- Developer: Spectacular Games
- Publisher: Sega
- Platform: Sega Genesis
- Release: NA: November 1995

Prime Time NFL is a video game developed by Spectacular Games and published by Sega for the Sega Genesis. A Sega Saturn version was also planned but cancelled.

== Gameplay ==
Prime Time NFL is a sequel to NFL '95 starring Deion Sanders. All of the league's 30 teams (including the two new expansion teams, the Carolina Panthers and Jacksonville Jaguars) plus all of the league's players and attributes reflect the 1995 season.

== Reception ==
Next Generation reviewed the Genesis version of the game, rating it four stars out of five, and stated that "There is noting really wrong with Prime Time other than the fact that it isn't much better than last year's version."
