= Mean 18 =

1986 video game

- Amiga cover art
- Developer: Microsmiths
- Publishers: Accolade; Atari Corporation
- Designer: Rex Bradford
- Artist: George Karalias
- Platforms: MS-DOS, Amiga, Apple IIGS, Atari 7800, Atari ST, Mac
- Release: 1986: Amiga, ST, MS-DOS; 1988: Apple IIGS; 1989: 7800
- Genre: Sports
- Mode: Single-player

Mean 18 is a golf video game designed by Rex Bradford with graphics by George Karalias, both of Microsmiths, and released by Accolade for MS-DOS compatible operating systems in 1986. It was ported to the Amiga, Apple IIGS, Atari ST, and Macintosh. It includes an editor allowing players to create their own courses. In 1989, Atari Corporation published a port for the Atari 7800 console. A version for Atari 8-bit computers was in development in 1989 but was cancelled.

== Gameplay ==
Atari ST screenshot

Mean 18 includes the Augusta National and Pebble Beach and St. Andrews courses. It uses a 3-click control system, where the first click starts the swing, the second sets the power, and the third sets draw or fade.

There are Beginner and Expert difficulty options. The Expert mode has more pronounced draw and fade effects, making the timing of the third click more crucial. The player can also choose between regular and professional tees. For the Beginner mode, the program automatically recommends the best club. Using the Expert mode, the program still recommends clubs, but not necessarily the best one for the shot or places the golfer in line with the pin.

== Reception ==
Computer Gaming World cited the practice green, the computer caddy, and course editor as reasons for preferring the Amiga version of Mean 18 to the also-"outstanding" Leader Board. Info gave the Amiga version four stars out of five, stating "If you're a golfer, you'll like Mean 18" but criticizing the "blocky IBM-style graphics. Complete Amigatization would solve a lot of the problems". Compute! listed it in May 1988 as one of "Our Favorite Games", praising the graphics, sound, realism, and course editor.

David M. Wilson and Johnny L. Wilson reviewed the game for Computer Gaming World, and stated that "This may be the ultimate professional golf simulation. Outstanding graphics and sound are its hallmarks."

The game sold more than 200,000 copies.
