= NFL Football '94 Starring Joe Montana =

1994 video game

- North American cover art
- Developer: BlueSky Software
- Publisher: Sega (Note: Released under the Sega Sports banner.)
- Producer: Chris Smith
- Composer: Sam Powell
- Series: Joe Montana Football
- Platform: Sega Genesis/Mega Drive
- Release: NA: November 1993; JP: February 4, 1994
- Genre: Sports (American football)
- Modes: Single-player, multiplayer

NFL Football '94 Starring Joe Montana, released as simply NFL Football '94 in Japan, is a 1993 American football video game developed by BlueSky Software and published by Sega for the Sega Genesis. It features realistic running commentary while the player engages in exhibition, regular season, or playoff action. It is fifth in the Joe Montana Football series and the fourth to be developed by BlueSky Software. Unlike the earlier Joe Montana Football, this game had both NFL and NFLPA licenses, and as such, contains all of the league's (then) 28 NFL teams, as well as its players and their attributes for the 1993 season.
