= Magical Hat =

Japanese anime television series

- まじかるハット
- Genre: Adventure, fantasy
- Created by: Yōji Katakura
- Developed by: Kenji Terada
- Directed by: Akira Shigino
- Music by: Edison
- Country of origin: Japan
- Original language: Japanese
- No. of episodes: 33

Production
- Executive producer: Yuji Nunokawa (Studio Pierrot)
- Producers: Kenji Shimizu (Fuji TV); Yoshihisa Tachikawa (Fuji TV); Minoru Ono (Yomiko); Shigehiro Suzuki (Studio Pierrot)
- Production companies: Fuji Television; Yomiko Advertising; Studio Pierrot

Original release
- Network: FNS (Fuji TV)
- Release: October 18, 1989 – July 6, 1990

Related
- Manga
- Written by: Yōji Katakura
- Published by: Shogakukan
- Imprint: Tentomushi Comics Special
- Magazine: Various
- Original run: 1989 – 1990
- Video game

Magical Hat's Turbo Flight! Adventure
- Developer: Vic Tokai
- Publisher: Sega
- Genre: Platform
- Platform: Mega Drive
- Released: December 15, 1990

Magical Hat (まじかるハット, Majikaru Hatto) is a Japanese anime television series created by Yōji Katakura and produced by Studio Pierrot that aired on Fuji Television and its affiliates from October 1989 to July 1990. A manga adaptation by Katakura was serialized in many of Shogakukan's magazines in 1989, such as Shogaku Ichinensei, Shogaku Ninensei, Shogaku Shi-nensei, Shogaku Roku-nensei and Bessatsu CoroCoro Comic. It was collected into two tankonbon volumes in October 1989 and May 1990, though it was left unfinished due to Katakura's death in 1997.

Both the anime and the manga were planned simultaneously as a media mix project.

== Plot ==
63,000 years ago, there was a hero who fought against the demons of the Underworld, who had conspired to conquer the Earth. The legendary hero was called Magical Hat. According to legend, the hero used his mysterious magical psychic powers to defeat the demons and sealed the Underworld under the island of Usontō ("Uson Island"), where the demons have remained ever since, isolated by a magical seal.

In the present day, a young boy named Hat comes to the island with his parents, who are researching the legends of the Underworld. Hat's father, an archaeologist, plans to research the area near a large volcano on the island, where the legendary Magical Hat was believed to have engaged in battle. Suddenly, an earthquake hits the island and Hat falls into the volcano, breaking the seal to the Underworld, ruled by King Aleph. Aleph's brother in-law, Guwaru the Ziarc, opposes him and has plans to seize the throne. When Hat enters the Underworld, Guwaru and Aleph are in a struggle for power. Guwaru banishes Aleph, and breaks Usontō up into seven separate islands.

After entering the Underworld and meeting Guwaru, Hat discovers a statue which possesses the spirit of the legendary Magical Hat. He is told that he is a descendant of Magical Hat, and that he shall realize his destiny as the second incarnation of the hero, to stop Guwaru, reunify the continent and restore King Aleph to the throne. Thus, Hat becomes transformed into the new Magical Hat, and the adventure begins. The turban that Hat wears contains powerful magic that the wearer can control. Using the magical powers of this turban, he can defeat Guwaru and complete his quest. However, if Guwaru gets a hold of the turban, all hope is lost. With the help of his partners, Hot-ken, Grandpa Tau, Spin and Robogg, Hat must defeat Guwaru and stop his new reign once and for all.

== Characters ==
=== Main characters ===
Hat (ハット, Hatto)
Voiced by: Kazue Ikura
A 10-year-old boy who comes to Usontō with his parents. During an earthquake, he falls into the island's volcano, and ends up in the Underworld, where he learns that he is the descendant of Magical Hat. He uses the magical powers of the turban that he wears to defeat Guwaru and complete his quest. Hat's design was inspired by Fuji TV's Yume Kōjō '87 mascot Imajin.
Hot-ken (ホットケン, Hottoken)
Voiced by: Tomiko Suzuki
The canine Prince of the Underworld and the son of King Aleph. Despite his title, he is meek and cowardly, though still quick to anger whenever he gets abused or mistaken for a dog. He is usually the victim of bullying, especially by Kowaru.
Grandpa Tau (タウじいさん, Tau Jīsan)
Voiced by: Jōji Yanami
An elderly man and King Aleph's younger brother. He becomes acquainted with Hat and Hot-ken after the Underworld launches its attack on the surface. He is very knowledgeable and occasionally helpful, but also has an uncomfortable, perverted side. He also serves as the narrator.
Spin (スピン, Supin)
Voiced by: Naoko Matsui
An independent, resourceful yet selfish teenage girl with a fondness for sweets and firearms, who has taken it upon herself to rid her home, the Mountain Island, of its sudden and deleterious fascination with gold.
Robogg (ロボッグ, Roboggu)
Voiced by: Kumiko Nishihara
A tiny egg-like robot and an "Ultimate Surefire Rescue Machine" created by Grandpa Tau. Based on the juvenile ecology of the Phoenix tribe, he is capable of transforming into any mechanical object, such as a helicopter or submarine, and ends most of his sentences with "nya". At the beginning of the manga's serialization, he spoke in an expressive yet dumb voice, but in the anime, he spoke in a lisping tone, which was carried over to the manga.

=== Antagonists ===
Guwaru the Ziarc (グワル・ザ・ジアーク, Guwaru za Jiāku)
Voiced by: Kenji Utsumi
A powerful demon in the Underworld who opposes King Aleph, his brother-in-law. As a noble, he is the one most eager to take the fight back to the human race that sealed the Underworld away, and plots to conquer the Earth. His powers of deception make him a shrewd and dangerous foe.
Kowaru the Ziarc (コワル・ザ・ジアーク, Kowaru za Jiāku)
Voiced by: Mie Suzuki
Guwaru's son, King Aleph's nephew and Hot-ken's cousin, a kitsune-like demon with a bratty, selfish personality but a similar amount of cunning to his father. He and Dogu try to come up with a new scheme to steal Hat's turban and turn it over to Guwaru, and he harasses Hat and his friends at every chance he gets. Kowaru also has a crush on Spin, which she takes advantage of. He hates vegetables, especially green peppers.
Dogu (ドグー, Dogū)
Voiced by: Chafurin
Guwaru and Kowaru's faithful dogū servant. He can float and wield his paper-thin arms like whips, has a family, and ends most of his sentences with "dogū".
CO2 (CO2, CO2)
Voiced by: Minoru Inaba
A henchman working under Guwaru and Kowaru, who rules the Jungle Island.
Haōju (ハオージュ, Haōju-goe)
Voiced by: Masahiro Anzai
A henchman working under Guwaru and Kowaru, who rules the Sand Island.

=== Others ===
King Aleph (アレフ王, Arefu Ō)
Voiced by: Shigezō Sasaoka
The King of the Underworld and Hot-ken's father. He keeps the Underworld in order, until his brother-in-law, Guwaru, banishes him during a struggle for power.
Moranbo (モランボ, Moranbo)
Voiced by: Shūichi Ikeda
A young man living on the Jungle Island, who notices CO2's plan and resists alone.
Kunchan (クンチャン, Kunchan)
Voiced by: Sukekiyo Kameyama
A mysterious Chinese man who usually runs a ramen stall. His catchphrase is "Kunchan's ramen is delicious!" In the manga, he plays an important role as a person who can decipher ancient characters.
Officer Kenchan (ケンチャン, Kenchan)
Voiced by: Tomohiro Nishimura
A Chinese police officer and Grandpa Tau's childhood friend.
Hat's Parents (ハットの両親, Hatto no Ryōshin-goe)
Voiced by: Shinya Ōtaki (Dad (パパ, Papa)), Run Sasaki (Mom (ママ, Mama))
Hat's father and mother, who take him with them to Usontō to research the legends of the Underworld. Hat's father is an archaeologist, and plans to research the area near the island's volcano, where the legendary Magical Hat was believed to have battled with the demons.
Yōji Katakura (方倉陽二, Katakura Yōji)
Voiced by: Himself
The creator of the manga series. He makes a cameo appearance in episode 24.

=== Petamo Beasts ===
G-Konger (G・コンガー, G Kongā)
Voiced by: Toshiharu Sakurai
Z-Saurer (Z・ザウラー, Z Zaurā)
Voiced by: Sukekiyo Kameyama
W-Eagler (W・イーグラー, W Īgurā)
Voiced by: Tomohiro Nishimura
Devil Kraken (デビルクラーケン, Debiru Kurāken)
Gingurobu (ギングロブ, Gingurobu)
Gilguinea (ギルギニ, Girugini)
Gargoyle (ガーゴイル, Gāgoiru)
Sea Golem (シーゴーレム, Shī Gōremu)

== Release ==
The 33-episode series, produced by Studio Pierrot aired on Fuji Television and its affiliates from October 18, 1989, to July 6, 1990, starting out on Wednesday nights at 6:30, but eventually jumping over to Friday near the end of the series. The anime was produced alongside the manga, and was part of a media mix by Sega, Pierrot and Fuji TV. Sega had creative input over the series as its main sponsor, and the exclusive rights to produce video games and toys. The series was directed by Akira Shigino, with Kotakara serving as the animation director. The screenplay was written by Kenji Terada. The characters were designed by Tsuneo Ninomiya. The music was produced by Edison. The anime's opening theme is "Daijōbu, Daibōken" (大丈夫、大冒険, "It's Okay, It's a Big Adventure") by Naoko Nozawa, and has two ending theme songs: "Mera Tenten-Kirakura" (メラ・テンテンキラクラ) (episodes 1-23) by Nozawa and "Bye Bye Baby" (episodes 24-33) by Ītomo Seinen-tai and K-chaps!. The series contains plenty of slapstick gag elements.

The final episode was scheduled to be broadcast on June 29, 1990, but was delayed by one week due to a special news program related to the wedding of Fumihito, Crown Prince of Japan.

== Episodes ==
No.	Title	Directed by	Written by	Original release date
1	"Magical Pipipi Powers (魔法ピピピのパワー)"	Akira Shigino (鴫野彰)	Shigemitsu Taguchi (田口成光)	October 18, 1989
2	"It's the Earth Demon, Dogu! (ドロ魔人だドグ〜!)"	Hiroaki Satō (佐藤博暉)	Shunichi Yukimuro (雪室俊一)	October 25, 1989
3	"The Mysterious Island of Glittering Gold (ナゾの島は金ピカリン)"	Osamu Uemura (上村修)	Kenji Terada (寺田憲史)	November 1, 1989
4	"Kowaru's True Love Story (コワルの純愛物語)"	Yūji Kawahara (河原ゆうじ)	Shigemitsu Taguchi (田口成光)	November 8, 1989
5	"Conquering the Gold Paradise (倒せイカす金ピカ天国)"	Hiroyuki Yokoyama (横山広行)	Sukehiro Tomita (富田祐弘)	November 15, 1989
6	"Pe! Pe! Petamos' Grand Gathering (ペ!ペ!ペタモ大集合)"	Yuta Iijima (飯島悠太)	Kenji Terada (寺田憲史)	November 22, 1989
7	"The Tale of the Intense Race (レースビンビン物語)"	Hiroaki Satō (佐藤博暉)	Shunichi Yukimuro (雪室俊一)	November 29, 1989
8	"Something's Up With the Pink Bugs? (なんか変化ピンクの虫)"	Osamu Uemura (上村修)	Kenji Terada (寺田憲史)	December 6, 1989
9	"Sumo MoriMori Island (すもうモリモリ森の島)"	Hiroyuki Yokoyama (横山広行)	Shigemitsu Taguchi (田口成光)	December 13, 1989
10	"The Death of Hat (勝手に死んだハット)"	Katsutoshi Sasaki (佐々木勝利)	Shigemitsu Taguchi (田口成光)	December 20, 1989
11	"Papa's Uneggspected Love (パパはタマたま卵好き)"	Yūji Kawahara (河原ゆうじ)	Hideo Takayashiki (高屋敷英夫)	January 10, 1990
12	"Hat's Great Makeover into a Girl (ハッと大変身女の子よ)"	Hiroaki Satō (佐藤博暉)	Isao Shizuya (静谷伊佐夫)	January 17, 1990
13	"See You in your Nightmares (悪夢で会いましょう)"	Hiroyuki Yokoyama (横山広行)	Sukehiro Tomita (富田祐弘)	January 24, 1990
14	"My Husband is an Alien! (ダンナ様は宇宙人だ〜)"	Osamu Uemura (上村修)	Sukehiro Tomita (富田祐弘)	January 31, 1990
15	"The Tale of a Good Friendship (なかよしおよし物語)"	Hiroyuki Yokoyama (横山広行)	Hideo Takayashiki (高屋敷英夫)	February 7, 1990
16	"The Magnificent Gyotaro (ぎょぎょぎょの魚太郎)"	Katsutoshi Sasaki (佐々木勝利)	Kenji Terada (寺田憲史)	February 14, 1990
17	"Cooked for Three Minutes! Hard-Boiled Hat (熱湯3分ゆでだこハット)"	Masaharu Tomoda (友田政晴)	Isao Shizuya (静谷伊佐夫)	February 21, 1990
18	"Who's the Sloth? (なまけものはダ〜レ?)"	Hiroyuki Yokoyama (横山広行)	Sukehiro Tomita (富田祐弘)	February 28, 1990
19	"Wait, Who Am I Again? (あれボク一体だれだっけ)"	Osamu Uemura (上村修)	Kenji Terada (寺田憲史)	March 7, 1990
20	"Clash! The Great Treasure Hunt Operation (対決!宝さがし大作戦)"	Katsutoshi Sasaki (佐々木勝利)	Isao Shizuya (静谷伊佐夫)	March 14, 1990
21	"Kowaru's Road to Success (コワルの出世街道物語)"	Masaharu Tomoda (友田政晴)	Kazuhito Hisajima (久島一仁)	March 21, 1990
22	"Go Outie and See the World! (な〜るへそザワールド)"	Akira Shigino (鴫野彰)	Kenji Terada (寺田憲史)	March 28, 1990
23	"Shine On! The Path to Heroism (輝け!英雄への道)"	Akira Shigino (鴫野彰)	Akira Shigino (鴫野彰)	April 13, 1990
24	"All-Time Best! Spring Bloopers Contest (完全保存版!春の珍プレー大賞)"	Masaharu Tomoda (友田政晴)	Akira Shigino (鴫野彰)	April 20, 1990
25	"My Beloved Egg! (タマゴで一番キミが好き!)"	Hiroyuki Yokoyama (横山広行)	Isao Shizuya (静谷伊佐夫)	April 27, 1990
26	"Is He Dead? Rerere's Spirit! (死んだンですか?レレレの霊!)"	Hiroyuki Ishido (石堂宏之)	Isao Shizuya (静谷伊佐夫)	May 11, 1990
27	"The Howl of the Sun Blade (Maruha)! (太陽剣は（マルハ）ほえ〜るス)"	Akira Shigino (鴫野彰)	Kenji Terada (寺田憲史)	May 18, 1990
28	"Father Flips Out (父ひっくりかえる)"	Kazunori Mizuno (水野和則)	Kazuhito Hisajima (久島一仁)	May 25, 1990
29	"A Sparkling Silver Egg (生まれたタマゴはギンギラギン)"	Yuta Iijima (飯島悠太)	Kenji Terada (寺田憲史)	June 1, 1990
30	"Feeble Hat in Fairytale Land (おとぎの国のヨボヨボハット)"	Hiroyuki Yokoyama (横山広行)	Sukehiro Tomita (富田祐弘)	June 8, 1990
31	"Ghosts Are Welcome (幽霊さんいらっしゃい)"	Hiroyuki Ishido (石堂宏之)	Isao Shizuya (静谷伊佐夫)	June 15, 1990
32	"Find Grandpa Tau's Hidden Treasure! (タウじいさんの秘宝を探せ!)"	Satoshi Nishiura (西浦哲)	Satoshi Namiki (並木敏)	June 22, 1990
33	"Is There Really Peace in the Underworld? (魔界の平和はホンマかいな!?)"	Hiroyuki Yokoyama (横山広行)	Kenji Terada (寺田憲史)	July 6, 1990

== Video game ==
Sega released a Mega Drive game based on the series on December 15, 1990, called Magical Hat no Buttobi Turbo! Daibōken (まじかるハットのぶっとびターボ！大冒険, Majikaru Hatto no Buttobi Tābo! Daibōken; trans. Magical Hat's Turbo Flight! Adventure) and developed by Vic Tokai. Magical Hat no Buttobi Turbo! Daibōken is an action platform game similar to Vic Tokai's Kid Kool and Psycho Fox. The player takes control of Hat to guide him through Usontō's seven islands, jumping on and punching enemies, grabbing items from statues, and fighting a boss at the end of each world. In each stage, the player can find Roboggu, who will help Hat out by acting as a projectile and a shield. The game has a wide range of different power-up items that can be obtained, which can give the player temporary invincibility, freeze all the enemies for a short time, give the player an extra-high jump, or even call in air support from a helicopter. At the end of each stage, the player can play a game of chance to win extra items and lives.

Japanese magazines Famitsu, Hippon Super, Beep! MegaDrive, Mega Drive Fan and Sega Saturn Magazine scored the game a 58%, 50%, 58%, 61%, and 62%, respectively. European magazines Joystick, Power Play, Computer and Video Games, The Complete Guide to Sega, Games-X, Sega Power and Sega Mega Drive Advanced Gaming scored the game a 70%, 71%, 84%, 90%, 63%, 100%, and 84%.

Due to Magical Hat never airing outside of Japan, Sega opted not to license the game in the West, so completely reworked the title, releasing it in 1991 as Decap Attack. The game features different characters, story, art, music, and level design, but has the same general gameplay.
