= Socket =

Socket may refer to:

== Mechanics ==
- Socket wrench, a type of wrench that uses separate, removable sockets to fit different sizes of nuts and bolts
- Socket head screw, a screw (or bolt) with a cylindrical head containing a socket into which the hexagonal ends of an Allen wrench will fit
- Socket termination, a termination used at the ends of wire rope
- Socket, the receptacle into which a tapered tool is inserted
- Socket, an opening in any fitting that matches the outside diameter of a pipe or tube

== Biology ==
- Eye socket, a region in the skull where the eyes are positioned
- Tooth socket, a cavity containing a tooth, in those bones that bear teeth
- Dry socket, an opening as a result of the blood not clotting after a tooth is pulled
- Ball and socket joint

== Computing ==
- Network socket, an end-point in a communication across a network or the Internet
- Unix domain socket, an end-point in local inter-process communication
- Berkeley sockets, an application programming interface for networking and inter-process communication
- CPU socket, the connector on a computer's motherboard for the CPU

== Electrical connectors ==
- AC power plugs and sockets, electrical devices used to connect to a power source onto which another device can be plugged or screwed in
- Antenna socket, a female antenna connector for a television cable
- Jack (connector), one of several types of electronic connectors
- Lightbulb socket, a connector into which a lamp light bulb screws

== Other uses ==
- Socket (telecommunications), a US based Internet and phone service provider
- Socket (video game), a video game created by Vic Tokai on the Sega Genesis
- Socket (film), a 2007 film

== See also ==
- IC socket (disambiguation)
- Websocket
