= IC extractor =

Tool for removing ICs from sockets

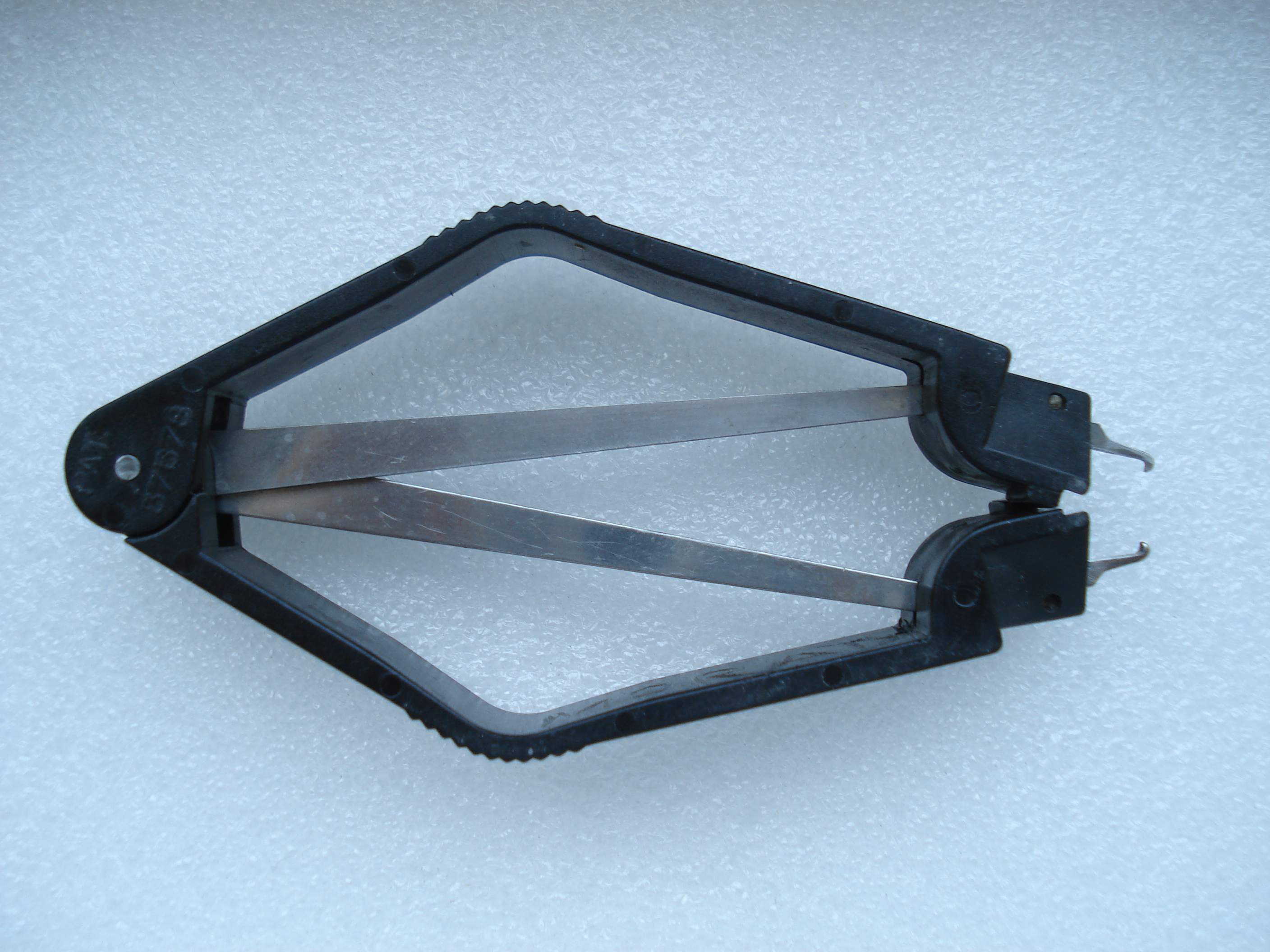
IC extractor tool, which is used for removing PLCC ICs

A PLCC package being removed from its socket with a PLCC extractor

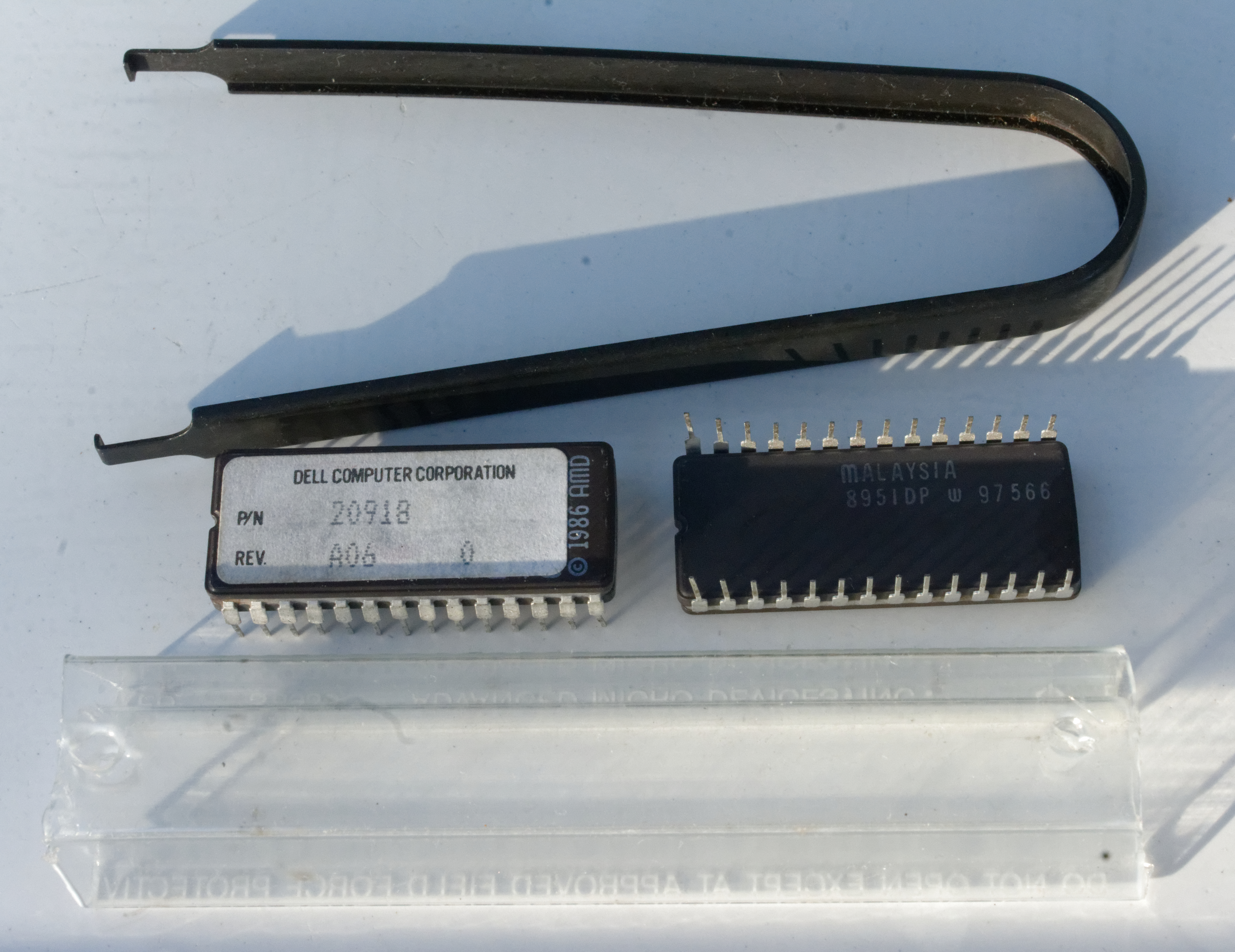
BIOS replacement kit for a Dell 310 from the late 1980s. Included are two DIL chips, a plastic holder for the chips, and a IC extractor for the DIL chips

An IC extractor is a tool for safely and quickly removing integrated circuits (ICs) from their sockets. The main purpose of using this tool is to avoid bending the socket pins and to avoid damage through electrostatic discharge (ESD).
