= Kagemaru =

Kagemaru can refer to:

People:

- Jōya Kagemaru, an artist

Fictional characters:

- Kage-Maru, a character in Virtua Fighter
- Kagemaru, a character in Yu-Gi-Oh! GX
- A character in Schubibinman Zero (in the Schubibinman series)
- A character in The Krion Conquest
- Kagemaru, nicknamed Kabamaru, the main character of Igano Kabamaru
