= Aerostar (video game) =

1991 video game

- North American cover art
- Developer: Sigma Pro-Tech
- Publisher: Vic Tokai
- Platform: Game Boy
- Release: JP: June 28, 1991; NA: September 1991
- Genre: Shoot 'em ups
- Mode: Single-player

Aerostar (エアロスター) is a 1991 scrolling shooter video game developed by Sigma Pro-Tech and published by Vic Tokai in 1991 for the Nintendo Game Boy.

== Plot ==
After the end of the Sixth World War, the Earth has been rendered inhospitable and uninhabitable by humanity. The Intergalactic Council ruled that Earth could once again be used by humans and sent people there to restore civilization there. Meanwhile, mutants have prospered in the long-lost wastelands of Earth and were unwilling to allow the humans to have it again. The Intergalactic Council has sent in a lone fighter called Aerostar to defend the Earth from a second act of total destruction.

== Gameplay ==
The player faces enemies on both roads. One of them has to be fought while the other can be evaded.

The player controls a futuristic airplane that can only fly over certain roads. However, the aircraft can ascend and descend into other roads at the cost of being able to use firearms.

There are a variety of power-ups in the game; including missiles and lasers. Large bosses challenge the player in each level. There are three difficulty levels: easy, normal, and hard. Graphic details in the game include coastal streets, futuristic levels with instant-death spikes, jungles, and a fight in outer space.

== Release and reception ==
Reception

Review score
Publication	Score
Famicom Tsūshin	4/10, 5/10, 6/10, 3/10

Aerostar was released for the Game Boy in Japan June 28, 1991. It received a release in English territories first in September 1991.
