= Imperium (1992 video game) =

- North American cover art
- Developer: Jorudan
- Publisher: Vic Tokai
- Composer: Tenpei Sato
- Platform: Super NES
- Release: NA: November 1992; JP: December 18, 1992
- Genre: Scrolling shooter
- Mode: Single-player

Imperium (Mobile Armoured Dion [機動装甲 ダイオン Kidou Soukou Dion] in Japan) is a 1992 vertically scrolling shooter video game developed by Jorudan and published by Vic Tokai for the Super Nintendo Entertainment System.

== Plot ==
In the year 2027, Earth is suddenly attacked by the planetoid space fortress Zektron. Many cities are decimated and occupied by the Zektron forces, threatening to annihilate humanity. An underground military squadron and lab develops a small mecha called Dion (Imperium in the US version) aboard the mothership Leinoa, a mecha capable of harnessing great firepower. The human's goal is to send Dion/Imperium into Zektron and destroy it only after the Earth occupation forces have been eliminated.

== Gameplay ==
Imperium differs from most shooters in many ways. There is no high score counter, but instead an experience points counter is displayed. Players earn experience points by destroying multitudes of enemies and the numbers differ depending on the size of the enemy. Players then earn additional weapons and power-ups for each weapon through a set number of experience points. The player has a five-hit life bar. If a player takes a hit, then whatever weapon they were using when they were hit is down graded by one point. Players can replenish health and any downgraded weapon by earning back experience points. The player also has speed-change control, which they can use to change the speed of their mech to five different levels. The player has no lives. If the player dies, then it's Game Over. However, they can start on the level they died on by using the Continue option that shows up on the main menu after dying. The player can only use the continue option four times.

== Development ==
In its September 1992 issue, Electronic Gaming Monthly estimated that Imperium was 80% complete and on track for November.

== Region differences ==
Although the game played out the same and featured similar music and sounds, the Western version does have different content from the Japanese version :

- Mobile Armoured Dion featured large level design detail with different backgrounds layered over each other, particularly in level 2 where large construction beams forming squares span over the beach and ocean background and a different colour palette (orange). The extra layered backgrounds were removed in the US version Imperium.
- The Wave weapon in Imperium was originally a large fireball weapon in Mobile Armoured Dion.

== Reception ==
Reception

Review scores
| Publication | Score |
|---|---|
| Famitsu | 21/40 |
| Super Play | 40% |
| Control | 51% |
| Hippon Super! | 6/10 |
| Super Action | 78% |
| The Super Famicom | 55/100 |
| Super Gamer | 60% |
| Super Pro | 60/100 |

Imperium received a 16.32/30 score in a 1993 readers' poll conducted by Super Famicom Magazine, ranking among Super Famicom titles at the number 304 spot. The game also received mixed reviews from critics. Super Gamer stated that the game had a novel power-up system and plenty of challenge, but found the graphics to be banal and the gameplay more frustrating than enjoyable.
