= Conflict (video game) =

1989 video game

- North American cover art
- Developer: Vic Tokai
- Publisher: Vic Tokai
- Programmer: Tomohiko Kawamura
- Composer: Michiharu Hasuya
- Platform: NES
- Release: JP: December 1, 1989; NA: March 1990
- Genre: Strategy
- Mode: Single-player or multiplayer

Conflict is a 1989 hex-based war game developed and published by Vic Tokai for the Nintendo Entertainment System. It was the first NES game to display the battlefield as a hex map.

== Gameplay ==
Conflict is a wargame where the player is a commander who must lead their forces to victory. The player can earn fame points by occupying cities and airports and destroying units of the opponent's army; fame points are lost by losing units of one's army in battle or retreating from battles. The goal of each of the 16 scenarios is to destroy the enemy's flag tank. The first player controls the blue (Western Bloc) forces while the computer (or second player) controls red (Eastern Bloc) troops.

Each player starts with two factories, at least one of which specializes in air combat units and at least one of which specializes in ground warfare units. On each turn, the player can, if they still have a factory that has not been destroyed, produce one military unit. The more fame points the player has, the more powerful units they can produce (e.g. tanks instead of infantry). The computer always starts with more fame points than the player; since this state of affairs tends to produce an increasingly overwhelming materiel advantage if left unaddressed, the goal of depleting the computer's fame points, usually by destroying powerful red Army units, tends to be a high priority at the beginning of the game.

The hexagons can be plains, woods, mountains, barren terrain, shoals, seas, bridges, airports, towns, or factories. The terrain in each hexagon has an effect on maneuverability and the extent to which forces can take evasive action. Units can be repaired, refueled, and rearmed at cities or airports, depending on whether the unit is a ground or air unit. A sequel was released for the Super NES entitled Super Conflict.

== Reception ==
The Japanese release of the game was reviewed in issue 89 of Famicom Tsūshin, with two reviewers scoring it at 5 out of 10 and two at 6 out of 10, for a total score of 22/40; the reviewers commented that the hex-tiled map was novel for the platform, but that battles took too long. Famicom Hisshobon gave the game a positive review in issue 85, with the reviewer commenting on the "thrilling" battles and the range of units available.

The May 1990 issue of Nintendo Power magazine reviewed the US release, giving it an overall rating of 4 out of 5. VideoGames & Computer Entertainment included the game in their Best Games: 1990 roundup, giving it an honorable mention in the Best Military-Strategy Game category and calling it "a quality contest for the armchair general".
