= Chip carrier =

Surface mount technology package for integrated circuits

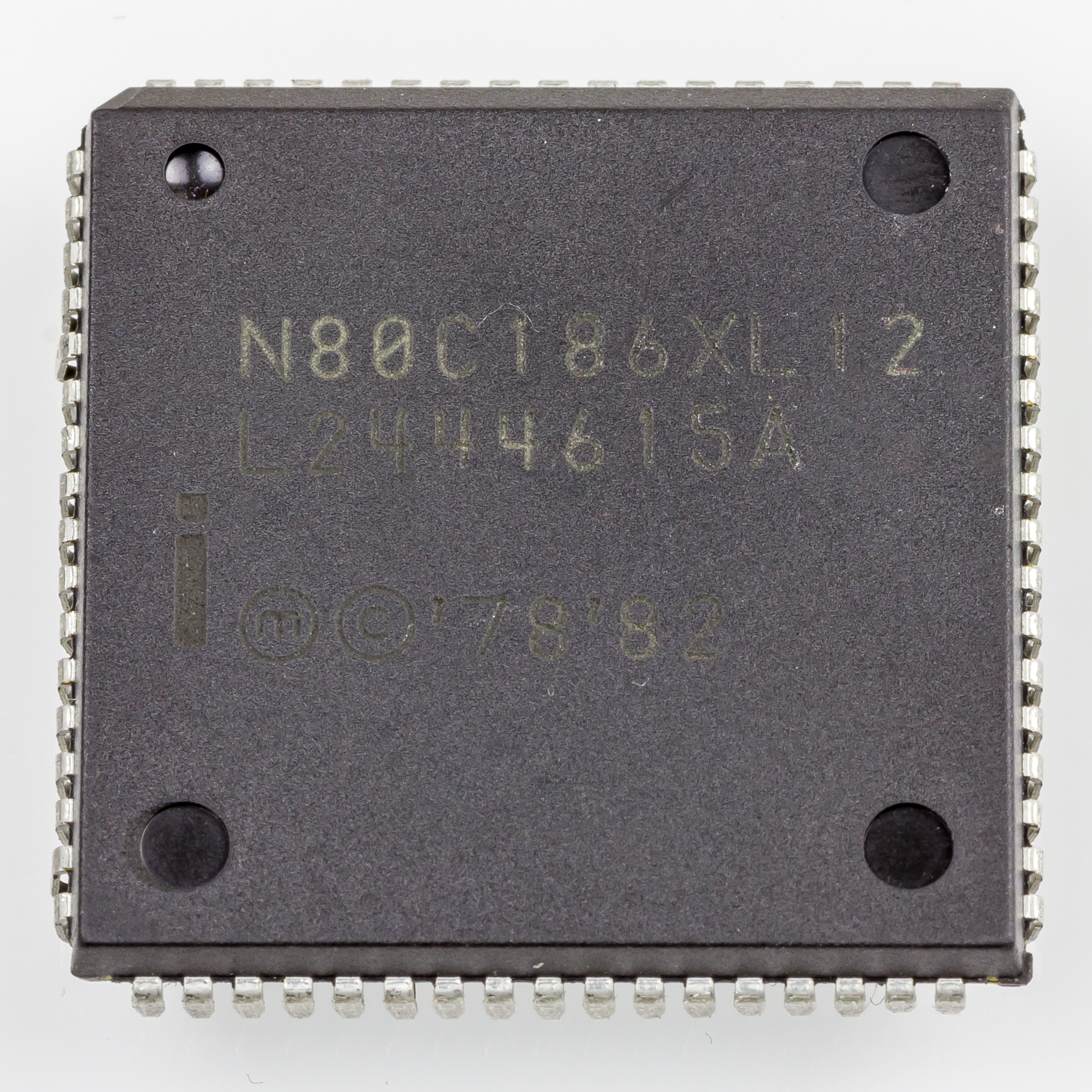
Intel 80186 in QFJ68 / PLCC68, an example of a plastic leaded chip carrier

In electronics, a chip carrier is one of several kinds of surface-mount technology packages for integrated circuits (commonly called "chips"). Connections are made on all four edges of a square package, the outer edges of which contain metal pins that carry power and signals to and from the rest of the system. Compared to the internal cavity that holds the integrated circuit, the overall size of the package is large to provide room for robust pins.

== Types ==
Chip carriers may have either J-shaped metal leads for connections by solder or by a socket, or may be lead-less with metal pads for connections. If the leads extend beyond the package, the preferred description is "flat pack". Chip carriers can be smaller than dual in-line packages (DIPs) and since they use all four edges of the package they can have a larger pin count. Additionally, they normally space their pins closer together, 0.05 inches apart compared to 0.1 for the earlier DIP standard.

Chip carriers may be made of ceramic or plastic. Some forms of chip carrier package are standardized in dimensions and registered with trade industry associations such as JEDEC. Other forms are proprietary to one or two manufacturers. Sometimes the term "chip carrier" is used to refer generically to any package for an integrated circuit.

Types of chip-carrier package are usually referred to by initialisms and include:

- BCC: Bump chip carrier
- CLCC: Ceramic leadless chip carrier
- Leadless chip carrier (LLCC): Leadless chip carrier, contacts are recessed vertically.
- LCC: Leaded chip carrier
- LCCC: Leaded ceramic chip carrier
- DLCC: Dual lead-less chip carrier (ceramic)
- PLCC: Plastic leaded chip carrier
- PoP: Package on package

== Pin counts ==
As part of various standardization efforts, the dimensions and number of pins on a chip carrier commonly come in a number of standardized sizes:

- 20-pin (LCC20)
- 28-pin (LCC28)
- 32-pin (LCC32)
- 44-pin (LCC44)
- 52-pin (LCC52)
- 68-pin (LCC68)
- 84-pin (LCC84)

The PLCC28 is a direct match for the common 28-pin DIP and offered a simple upgrade path for many existing products, packaging them in a much smaller area around 132 mm^{2} as opposed to 540 for the DIP. PLCC44 was good replacement for 40-pin DIP, but many designs originally based on 40-pin DIP packaging would move to the PLCC68 format instead, providing enough pins to include an entire additional 28-pin design in the same package while still being smaller at about 625 mm^{2} compared to around 780 for a standard 40-pin DIP.

== Plastic-leaded chip carrier ==
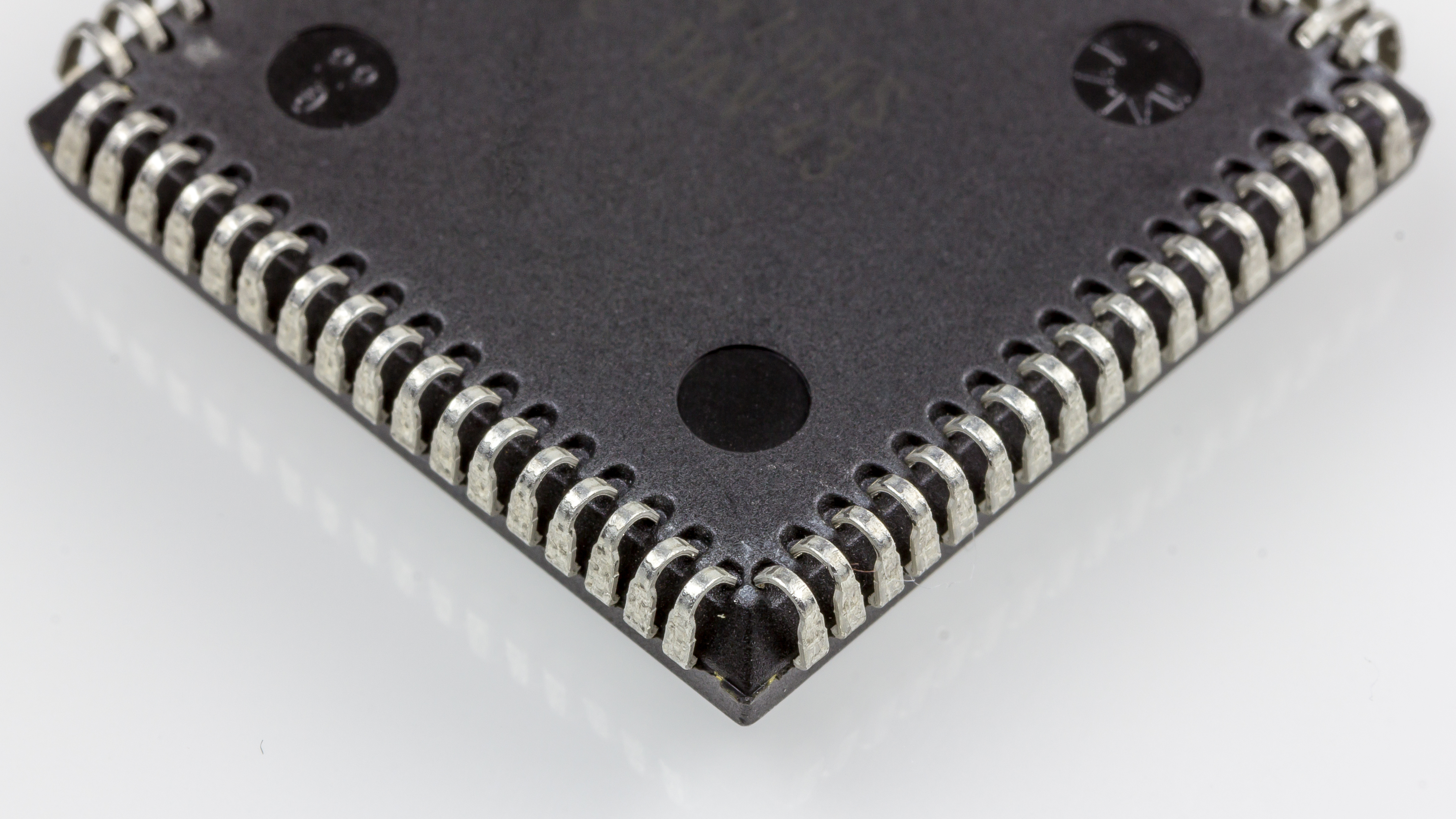
Reverse side of an Intel 80C86 in a PLCC68, showing the J-shaped metal leads.

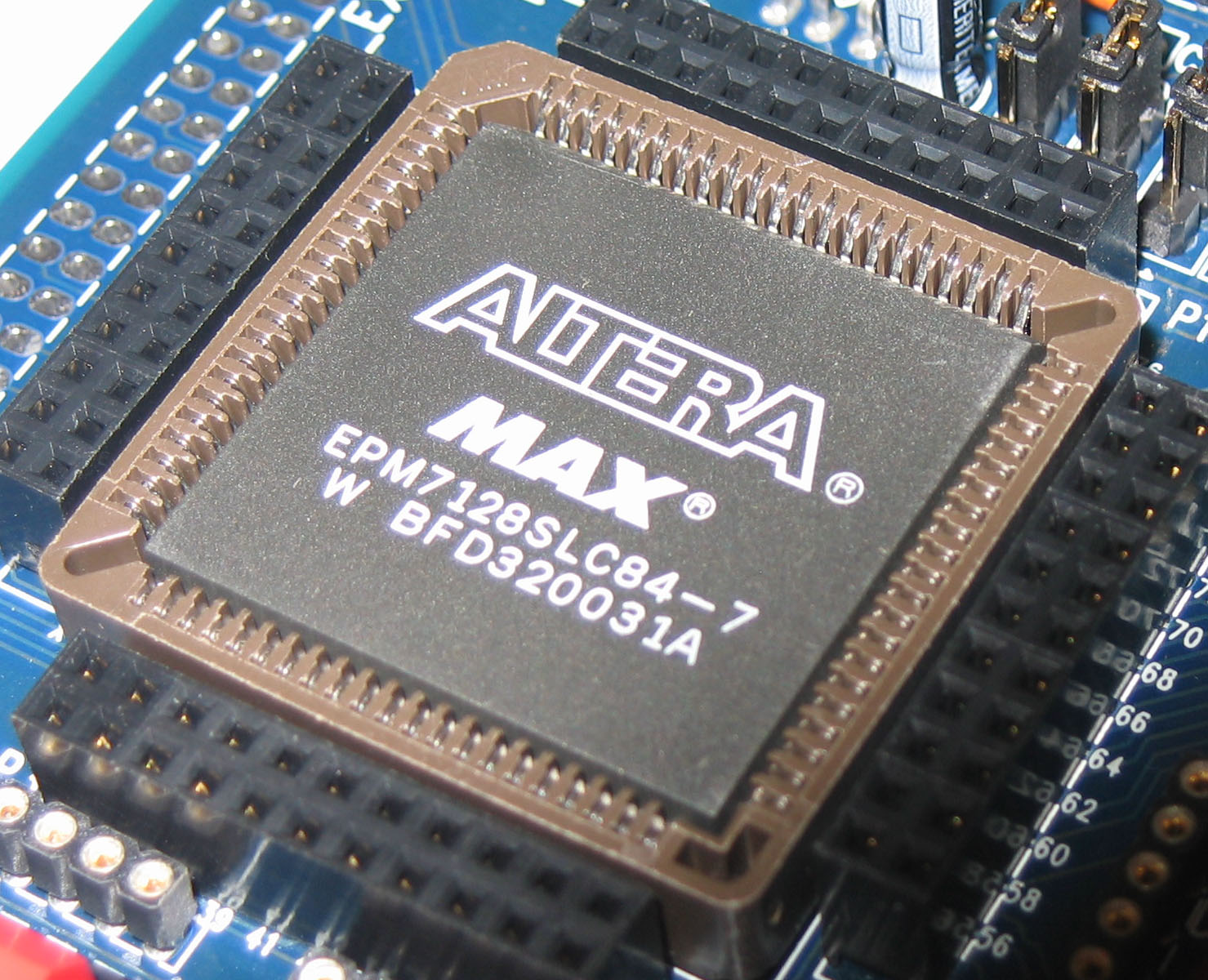
An Altera MAX 7000-series CPLD with 2500 gates in a PLCC84 socket.

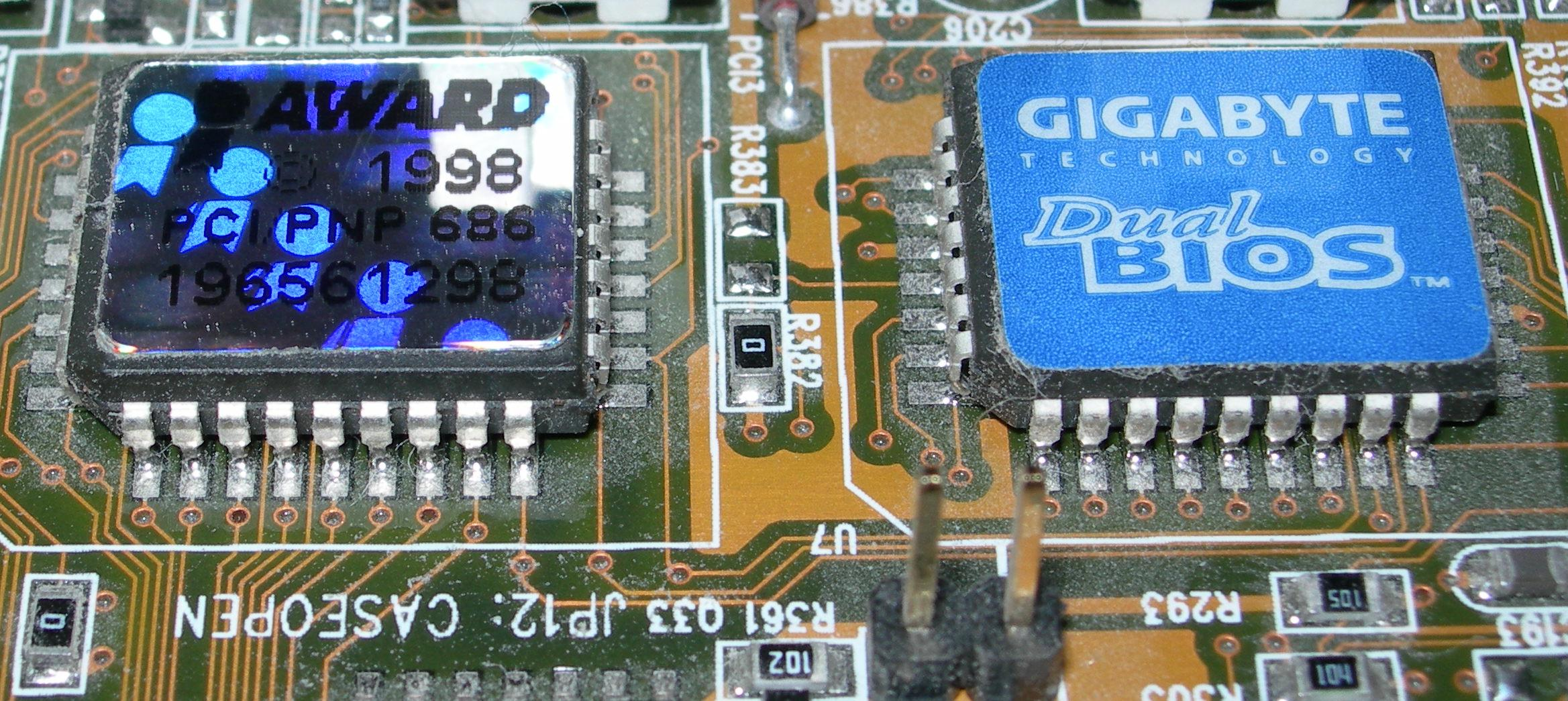
Gigabyte DualBIOS in QFJ32 / PLCC32.

A plastic-leaded chip carrier (PLCC) has a rectangular plastic housing. It is a reduced cost evolution of the ceramic leadless chip carrier (CLCC).

A premolded PLCC was originally released in 1976, but did not see much market adoption. Texas Instruments later released a postmolded variant that was soon adopted by most major semiconductor companies. The JEDEC trade group started a task force in 1981 to categorize PLCCs, with the MO-047 standard released in 1984 for square packages and the MO-052 standard released in 1985 for rectangular packages.

The PLCC uses a "J"-lead with pin spacings of 0.05" (1.27 mm). The metal strip forming the lead is wrapped around and under the edge of the package, resembling the letter J in cross-section. Lead counts range from 20 to 84. PLCC packages can be square or rectangular. Body widths range from 0.35" to 1.15". The PLCC "J" Lead configuration requires less board space versus equivalent gull leaded components, which have flat leads that extend out perpendicularly to the narrow edge of the package. The PLCC is preferred over DIP style chip carriers when lead counts exceed 40 pins due to the PLCC's more efficient use of board surface area.

The heatspreader versions are identical in form factor to the standard non-heatspreader versions. Both versions are JEDEC compliant in all respects. The heatspreader versions give the system designer greater latitude in thermally-enhanced board level and/or system design. RoHS compliant, lead-free and green material sets are now qualified standards.

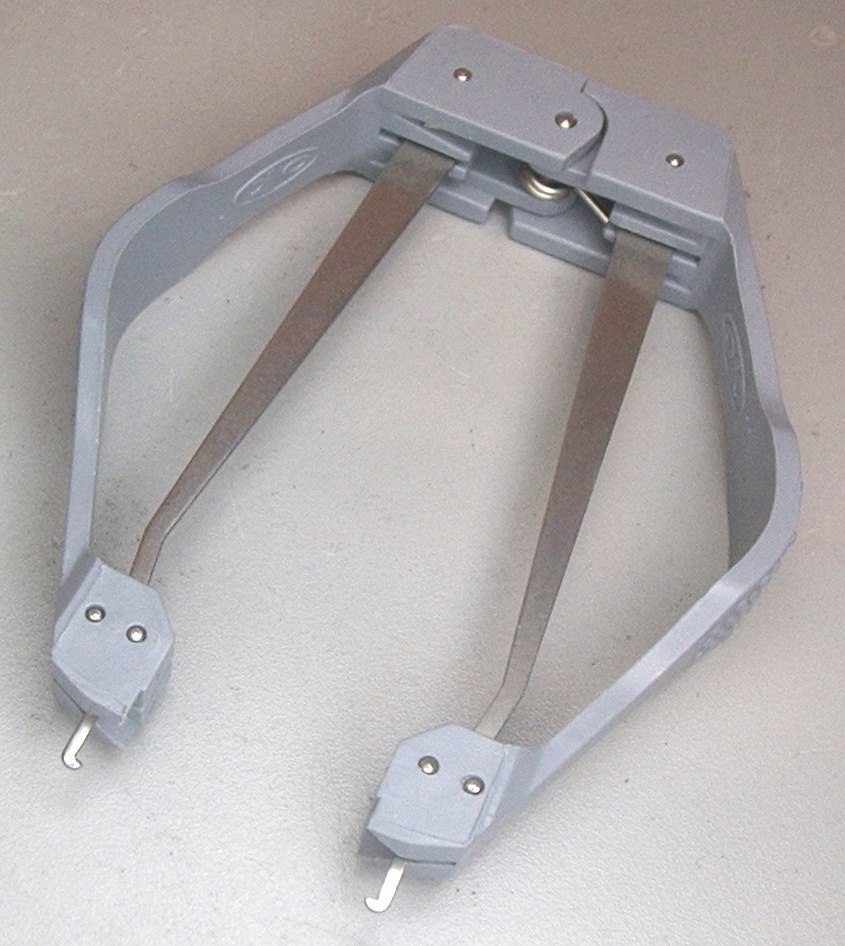
Leaded chip carrier extraction tool. Vacuum picks may also be used instead.

A PLCC circuit may either be installed in a PLCC socket or surface-mounted. PLCC sockets may in turn be surface mounted, or use through-hole technology. The motivation for a surface-mount PLCC socket would be when working with devices that cannot withstand the heat involved during the reflow process, or to allow for component replacement without reworking. Using a PLCC socket may be necessary in situations where the device requires stand-alone programming, such as some flash memory devices. Some through-hole sockets are designed for prototyping with wire wrapping.

A specialized tool called a PLCC extractor facilitates the removal of a PLCC from a socket.

PLCCs continue to be used for a wide variety of device types, which would include memory, processors, controllers, ASICs, DSPs, etc. It is particularly common for read-only memories, as it provides an easily swappable socketed chip. Applications range from consumer products through automotive and aerospace.

== Leadless ==
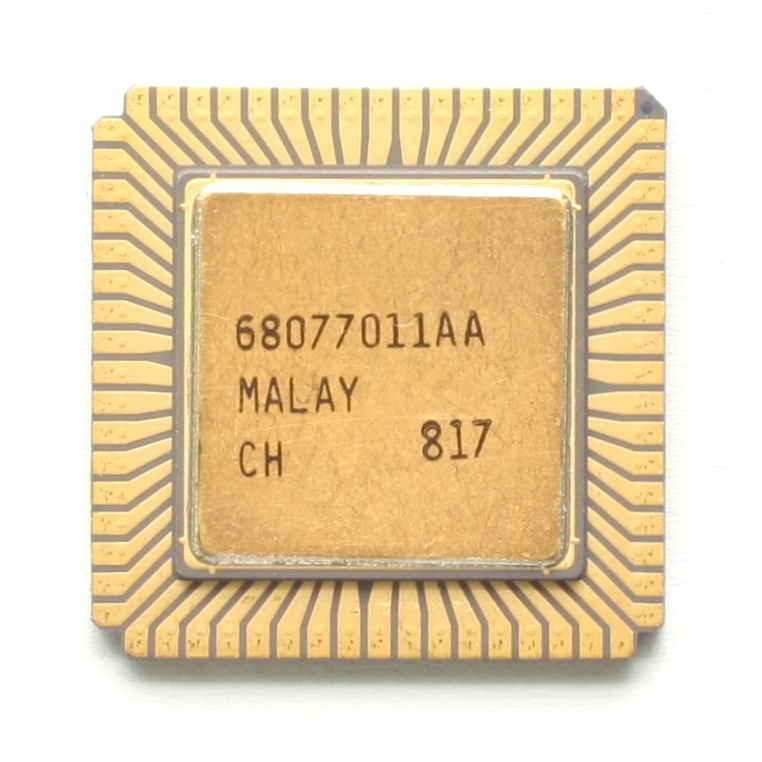
Ceramic leadless package of Intel 80286 (bottom)

A leadless chip carrier (LCC) has no "leads", but instead has rounded pins through the edges of the ceramic or molded plastic package.

Prototypes and devices intended for extended temperature environments are typically packaged in ceramic, while high-volume products for consumer and commercial markets are typically packaged in plastic.

== See also ==
- List of electronic component packaging types
