= Battle Mania Daiginjō =

1993 video game

- Developer: Vic Tokai
- Publisher: Vic Tokai
- Platform: Mega Drive
- Release: December 24, 1993
- Genre: Scrolling shooter
- Mode: Single-player

Battle Mania Daiginjō (Note: Japanese: バトルマニア 大(だい)吟(ぎん)醸(じょう), Hepburn: Batoru Mania Daiginjō) is a 1993 horizontally scrolling shooter developed and published by Vic Tokai for the Mega Drive. It serves as a sequel to the original Battle Mania, which was released in North America under the title Trouble Shooter. Unlike the original Battle Mania, Daginjō was released exclusively for the Japanese and South Korean markets.

Battle Mania Daiginjō had a limited print run and is consequently one of the most expensive Sega Mega Drive games today.

== Gameplay ==
Gameplay screenshot

Battle Mania Daiginjō builds on the first release by introducing several improved features including tweaked weapon system where players now have more options to choose from for how they want to play the game. The game's pace has been significantly altered within the difficulty and the length of the stages. Uncommon to most shooter games, Daiginjō uses both vertical and horizontal scrolling for its stages. It has nine levels altogether, three more than its predecessor.

== Reception ==
Reception

Review scores
Publication	Score
Beep! MegaDrive	6.5/10
Famitsu	5/10, 6/10, 6/10, 6/10
GameFan	69%, 75%, 70%, 82%
Jeuxvideo.com	17/20
Última Generación	72/100

Battle Mania Daiginjō received an average reception from critics. The game received a 8.7142/10 score in a 1995 readers' poll conducted by the Japanese Sega Saturn Magazine, ranking among Sega Mega Drive titles at number 24. Hardcore Gaming 101's Chris Rasa described it as "one of the best shooters available on the Mega Drive".
