= The Gene Machine =

1996 video game

- Developer: Divide By Zero
- Publisher: Vic Tokai
- Composer: Ian McCue
- Engine: Interspective
- Platform: MS-DOS
- Release: NA: 1996; EU: 1996
- Genre: Adventure
- Mode: Single-player

The Gene Machine is a graphical point-and-click action adventure game published in 1996 for MS-DOS by Vic Tokai. It was developed by Divide By Zero.

The game follows the adventures of fictional British gentleman Piers Featherstonehaugh (English: /ˈfænʃɔː/ FAN-shaw) and his manservant Mossop. The plot shares many common elements with the works of Jules Verne and H. G. Wells, as well as many literary and historical references to the Victorian era.
