= Trouble Shooter =

1991 video game

- Developer: Vic Tokai
- Publisher: Vic Tokai
- Director: Fujito Takada
- Composer: Hiroto Kanno
- Platform: Mega Drive/Genesis
- Release: NA: November 1991; JP: March 6, 1992
- Genre: Scrolling shooter
- Mode: Single-player

Trouble Shooter, originally released in Japan as Battle Mania (Note: Japanese: バトルマニア, Hepburn: Batorumania), is a horizontally scrolling shooter developed and published by Vic Tokai for the Mega Drive/Genesis. It was released in November 1991 in North America and March 6, 1992 in Japan. It was directed by designer Fujito "Takayan" Takada, who at first was primarily responsible for every aspect of the game's development due to a lack of support from Vic Tokai. Over time, however, more people joined the project, and he took on a supervisory role for much of the game's design.

The game was given a very distinct theme of self-parody between the enemies, story, and dialogue. A sequel titled Battle Mania Daiginjō was also released for the Mega Drive in Japan and Korea only.

== Gameplay ==
Gameplay screenshot

A combat operative Madison is assigned to rescue a prince who has been taken hostage. Players assume control over Madison (Note: Japanese: 大鳥居マニア, Hepburn: Ōtorii Mania) who is accompanied at all times by her partner Crystal (Note: Japanese: 羽田マリア, Hepburn: Haneda Maria). Unlike Madison, Crystal can flip firing positions, allowing her to fire behind Madison, and is invulnerable to all enemy fire.

At the beginning of almost every stage, the players have to choose a special weapon they can use during combat. After every use, however, the weapon needs to recharge in order to be used again. Players can select from four different power-ups consisting of the usual shooter icons (speed-ups, life-ups, firepower, and speed-downs). The player can stock up on Madison's hit points by collecting life-up icons, which is necessary as the game has no lives system and only offers the player three continues.

== Development and release ==
Trouble Shooter was designed by Fujito "Takayan" Takada, who fought hard in order to be able to get the game greenlit. Its basis was a prototype arcade game made years prior, and Takayan worked on every element of the game by himself early on due to Vic Tokai's reluctance about the project. The concept for Battle Mania was based on an idea for a manga that was set between 1995 and 1997, though it was originally meant to cover a longer span of time. Over time, more people joined the project. Takada was in charge of multiple areas, including public relations, game design, sales, graphics, programming, music, and scheduling. However, most of the work was done by other members of development, with Takada acting as support.

A scene where the protagonist is stomping on a Super Famicom was added due to Takada being annoyed by the budget given to Super Famicom games compared to Genesis games. Following this, a fax was sent to Sega development studios to avoid things that may disparage other companies' characters and trademarks. Takada speculated that he got away with it because Sega did not like Nintendo much at the time. Crystal's appearance where she explain the weapons in the game was originally going to be a man named Fugu, accompanied by a one-eyed cat with wheels for hind legs and pincers for front legs. Fugu was based on a character of the same name in the manga Trouble is My Business. Fugu was very unpopular with Sega's quality assurance team, leading to him being cut, which Takada regrets. Other things that served as an inspiration include the book series "The Gaming Magi" 80s idol Noriko Sakai, and locations near Sega's headquarters.

Despite finishing development in 1990, the game was not released until November 1991 in North America. It was later released in Japan on March 6, 1992.

== Reception ==
Reception

Review scores
Publication	Score
AllGame	3.5/5
Aktueller Software Markt	8/12
Beep! MegaDrive	7/10
Consoles +	50%
Famitsu	22/40
Jeuxvideo.com	13/20
Joypad	78%
Joystick	90%
Game Power	85%
Mega Drive Advanced Gaming	61%
MegaTech	71%
Power Play	68%
Sega Power	86%
Sega Pro	73/100

Trouble Shooter received a 22.92/30 score in a poll conducted by Mega Drive Fan and a 8.1151/10 score in a 1995 readers' poll conducted by the Japanese Sega Saturn Magazine, ranking among Sega Mega Drive titles at the number 94 spot. The game also garnered generally favorable reviews from critics.

GamePro's David Winstead praised its humorous story, anime-style graphics, soundscapes and dynamic gameplay. Sega-16's Ken Horowitz liked the game and believed it would appeal to fans of scrolling shooters, but expressed reservations about its difficulty and lamented its box art, speculating that it contributed to people avoiding it in North America. Mega Play's four reviewers found the idea of playing with two female protagonists unique for a scrolling shooter, while commending its fun gameplay, variety of power-ups, bosses, and cool music.

== Legacy ==
Initially, management was not interested in producing a sequel despite Takada's interest; however, market research showed that Trouble Shooter was popular, and thus he was allowed to make its sequel, Battle Mania: Daiginjō. Having thrown away his design document for Trouble Shooter, he had to try to remember what he could for the sequel. While Trouble Shooter released in the United States, its sequel would only release in Japan and Korea.

Takada later pitched another sequel on the Dreamcast titled Battle Mania 3 NY: Gankutsujou. The project was cancelled early on, as the team could not find an interested publisher.
