= Daedalian Opus =

1990 video game

- Developer: Vic Tokai
- Publisher: Vic Tokai
- Platform: Game Boy
- Release: 1990
- Genre: Puzzle
- Mode: Single-player

Daedalian Opus (冒険!パズルロード, Bōken! Pazuru Rōdo; Adventure! Puzzle Road) is a puzzle video game for the Game Boy that was released in 1990. It was developed and published by Vic Tokai.

== Gameplay ==
The game is essentially a series of 36 puzzles with pentominos that must be rotated, flipped, and assembled to completely fill a specific shape. These puzzles have been compared to tangram puzzles. The puzzles start off with rectangular shapes and simple solutions, but the puzzles quickly grow more complex, with odder shapes like a rocket ship, a gun, and even enlarged versions of some of the pentominoes themselves. A lot of trial and error is required. Each level is timed, and once the timer is started it cannot be stopped until the level is finished.

Each level takes place on its own island, and solving the puzzle will build a bridge that allows the player to cross to the next island. The levels begin by providing only 3 or 4 pieces, but more are acquired over the course of the game, until all 12 pieces are acquired. You do not always need all of the pieces to finish a level. At the final level, the player is given a 13th piece, and must complete a 8x8 square puzzle. The 13th piece is the 2x2 square tetromino.

After completing each level, the player was given a password to access that level at a later time. Each password was a common English four-letter word, so that by guessing common four-letter words, players could potentially access levels they had not actually reached by playing the game. The word ZEAL would unlock a level selection screen; this was given to the player after completing the final level.

According to Jeux Video, there are 36 levels but 42 islands.

== Development and ports ==
The name of the game, "Daedalian Opus", refers to Daedalus, the mythical character of Greek legend who created the labyrinth. The game contains no labyrinths whatsoever.

A faithful fan version was later coded for the MSX computer system by Karoshi Corporation in 2006 for the game development contest MSXdev'06.

The game has been ported to different platforms, such as PC and GP2X.

== Legacy ==
The 2012 game Puzzle Fever has very similar gameplay.
