= Shinseiki Odysselya =

1993 video game

- Cover art
- Developer(s): Vic Tokai
- Publisher(s): Vic Tokai
- Composer(s): Tenpei Sato; Hisayoshi Ogura
- Platform(s): Super Famicom
- Release: JP: June 18, 1993
- Genre(s): Role-playing video game
- Mode(s): Single-player

Shinseiki Odysselya (神聖紀オデッセリア, lit. "Sacred Era Odyssey") is a role-playing video game released by Vic Tokai in Japan for the Super Famicom in 1993. An American version was scheduled in 1994 titled Lost Mission, but was canceled. A quick review of the game was published in Vol. 58 of Nintendo Power with a scheduled release date of March 1994, which criticized the game for its "poor story translation" and "standard RPG play."

== Sequel ==
Shinseiki Odysselya 2 was released in 1995 in Japan.
