= King Salmon (video game) =

1992 video game

- North American cover art
- Developer: Hot-B
- Publishers: NA: Vic Tokai; JP: Hot-B
- Composer: Masaharu Iwata
- Platform: Sega Genesis/Mega Drive
- Release: NA: July 1992; JP: September 26, 1992
- Genre: Sports
- Mode: Single-player

King Salmon: The Big Catch (キングサーモン) is a 1992 Sega Genesis/Mega Drive fishing video game that was developed by Hot-B and was released by Vic Tokai in North America. It was due for release in Europe by July, but the plan was cancelled.

== Gameplay ==
Players participate in a big fishing derby; and spend a day catching as many king salmon as possible. Many activities of real-life fishing are included like driving the boat, assembling the lure onto the fishing rod and overcome a motley crew of fishermen at the same time.

As players become successful in catching fish, they become stronger and more adept fishermen themselves. This system operates similar to a role-playing video game. Players can choose between a leisurely fishing trip that involves the aspect of fishing on a sunny afternoon or a championship mode where the game's story takes effect. One of the settings in the game is Vancouver Island; one of the places where king salmon are abundant.

Passwords allow players to resume where they left off.
