= Time Slip =

1993 video game

- Cover Illustration by Lawrence (Lars) Fletcher USA
- Developer: The Sales Curve
- Publisher: Vic Tokai
- Producer: James Loftus
- Designers: Dennis Gustafsson; James Loftus; David Bowler
- Composer: Martin Walker
- Platform: Super NES
- Release: NA: November 1993; EU: 1993
- Genres: Action; Platformer
- Mode: Single-player

Time Slip is a platform video game developed by The Sales Curve and published by Vic Tokai for the Super Nintendo Entertainment System. It features the adventures of Dr. Vincent Gilgamesh, a scientist attempting to foil an alien invasion to Earth by traveling to different historic ages. This game was only released to the Super Nintendo Entertainment System.

== Storyline ==
The game takes place in 2147, when the Tirmatians, intelligent alien beings from the planet Tirmat, discover a sort of space-time portal -or "rift", as it is called in the game- that interconnects their homeworld with Earth. Meanwhile, human astronomers discover the same rift, but are not aware of the existence of Tirmat. They also discover that the rift is growing in a geometric rate. As they try to study it, the Tirmatians launch an exploratory probe, named "Torquemada II", in order to find a planet similar to Tirmat; the probe soon finds Earth and sends information back to Tirmat.

As Earth astronomers continue studying the space-time rift in 2147, the Tirmat leadership agrees to send explorers to Earth. It turns out that the Tirmatians are planning to conquest Earth to convert it into "Tirmat II." However, the Tirmatians have learned that humans have highly developed fighting skills and a vast amount of weapons, and they obviously would not agree to be enslaved. Because the power of the human defense forces, they decide to change their strategy, abandoning a conventional, frontal attack on Earth forces (because they would likely face a high casualty rate and even a defeat) in favor of a plan focusing on a time-traveling technology. This plan consists in sending Tirmatian expeditionary forces to several historic ages, in order to interfere with the development of human weaponry. By doing this, they can secure a victory by truncating the evolution of human weapons, leaving humankind with nothing but weak weapons and at the mercy of Tirmatian forces in the future. But their carefully planned strategy has a flaw: it failed to take in count the human intellect.

As Tirmat expeditionary forces are dispatched, a group of scientists led by Dr. Vincent Gilgamesh unveils the prototype of a time-travelling machine. Suddenly, the Tirmatians launch an attack on the laboratory where Dr. Gilgamesh works; all but Dr. Gilgamesh are killed. Without having time to test the time-traveling machine, he decides to travel back in time to stop Tirmat's conquest plans. A battle between Dr. Gilgamesh and the Tirmatians starts, and it is only a matter of time to decide who shall win.

== Gameplay ==
The gameplay is similar to that of Contra III: The Alien Wars. The player uses several weapons, such as laser guns and bombs, which are collected as the game progresses. However, weapons are lost after losing a life. It is also possible to use armored vehicles in some levels. The game's mechanic also features a TGS bar, or "power bar", which must be filled with special time crystals before emptying; otherwise, the player will lose a life each time the bar empties. The TGS bar is a part of the time-traveling device, and must be filled frequently. The bar slowly empties itself and by being hurt by an enemy, so players must literally "run for their lives" and collect as many crystals they can. After scoring a given number of points, players are awarded extra lives.

Levels contain enemies and traps; players may find themselves fending off many weak enemies before battling an oversized (albeit weak) sub-boss, only to face an even stronger, bigger level boss. Traps, in turn, are based on the technology available in each age. Sets of traps are scattered all over the game.

== Reception ==
Reception

Review scores
Publication	Score
AllGame	2/5
GameZone	38/100
Super Play	60%
Video Games (DE)	72%
SNES Force	80/100
Super Pro	54/100
