= Super Conflict =

1993 video game

- North American cover art
- Developer: Manley & Associates
- Publisher: Vic Tokai
- Designer: Douglas A. Deardorff
- Artist: Jonathan Sposato
- Composer: Robert Ridihalgh
- Platform: Super NES
- Release: NA: March 1993; EU: 1994
- Genre: Strategy
- Modes: Single-player, multiplayer

Reception

Review scores
Publication	Score
Consoles +	43%
GameZone	55/100
Nintendo Power	3.275/5 (Note: Nintendo Power scored Super Conflict 3.3/5 twice for play control and theme/fun, 3.1/5 for graphics/sound and 3.4/5 for challenge.)
Video Games (DE)	69%
Play Time	78%
SNES Force	79/100
Super Control	71%
Super Pro	70/100

Super Conflict is a turn-based strategy video game released for the Super NES in March 1993. It is the sequel to Conflict for the NES.

== Gameplay ==
The red army has spread itself thin and is unready to face the assault from the blue army, who has taken to higher ground and is winning the conflict.

The player assumes the role of a commander of combined forces. The scope of each battle and the number and variety of military units available to fight with, increases as the game progresses. The game was marketed as gulf war themed, but gameplay is more consistent with potential cold war scenarios. There are two modes: short (which allows players to plan strategic battles without any tactical consequences) and long (which allows all units to participate in up to four rounds of constant warfare). The blue forces are armed with American weapons while the red forces are armed with Soviet-made weapons.

Super Conflict is a military simulation game played on a hex map in which players try to capture the opponent's "Flag Tank" or "Flag Ship". The map consists of various terrain tiles with movement and defense modifiers. For example, bridges and deserts lower the defense ratings of occupying troops; hills and mountains provide additional defenses but require more fuel to move through. There are over 55 different scenarios and 16 two-player scenarios.
