= Whip Rush =

1990 video game

- Developer: Vic Tokai
- Publishers: JP: Sega; NA: Renovation Products
- Composer: Toshiko Tasaki
- Platform: Sega Genesis
- Release: JP: May 26, 1990; NA: October 1990
- Genre: Scrolling shooter
- Mode: Single-player

Whip Rush (Note: Japanese: ウィップラッシュ 惑星ボルテガスの謎; lit. 'Whip Rush: Mystery of the planet Voltegas') is a space-themed, horizontally and vertically scrolling shooter released in 1990 for the Mega Drive and later that year in North America for the Sega Genesis.

== Plot ==
In the 22nd century, mankind has drained every planet in the Solar System of its natural resources. Three Alpha-type robotic spaceships left the overpopulated Earth on a mission to find similar planets to colonize. After five years, the pilots reported finding a similar planet they learned was called Voltegeus, but upon approach their transmission was lost and the ships never re-established contact. Less than a week after the discovery, a massive alien vessel materialized in the vicinity of Mars and started attacking the Earth. Thankfully, Earth's smallest, but most powerful spaceship, the Whip Rush, is ready to attack. It is now up to the Whip Rush to stop the invasion of the Voltegians and discover what truly happened to the missing colony ships.

== Reception ==
Reception

Review scores
Publication	Score
Electronic Gaming Monthly	6/10, 7/10, 6/10, 6/10
GamePro	18/25
