= Decap Attack =

1991 video game

- European cover art
- Developer: Vic Tokai
- Publisher: Sega
- Director: Toshihisa Hasegawa
- Composers: Fumito Tamayama; Hiroto Kanno
- Platform: Sega Genesis
- Release: NA: 1991; EU: October 9, 1991
- Genre: Platform
- Mode: Single-player

Decap Attack is a 1991 platform game developed by Vic Tokai and published by Sega for the Genesis. The game is a westernized version of the 1990 Japanese Mega Drive game Magical Hat no Buttobi Tābo! Daibōken, with the art, plot, music, and level designs all being changed. Both are updates of the late 1980s games Kid Kool and Psycho Fox. The game has also been released as part of several emulated compilations.

== Plot ==
Chuck D. Head, a headless mummy created by Dr. Frank N. Stein and his assistant Igor, is sent to defeat Max D. Cap, a demon from the Underworld who commands an army of monsters to conquer the surface world, splitting the skeleton-shaped cluster of islands the land is on into pieces in the process. After reforming the islands and defeating Max, Chuck sluggishly returns home, where Stein rewards him by transforming him into a human.

== Gameplay ==
The player controls a living mummy, named Chuck D. Head, through various side-scrolling levels to battle an underworld army led by Max D. Cap. Levels contain many enemies and hazards that can harm or kill Chuck, and power-ups to collect; at the end of the last level in every area, there is a boss to defeat. The player has a small number of health units, displayed as hearts, and a small number of lives. The fictional island the game takes place on, shaped like a skeleton, is split apart into many pieces. Individual levels are named after parts of the skeleton, such as Abdomainland or Armington. Some levels require the player to collect a certain item for Dr. Frank N. Stein, the mad scientist who created Chuck.

Chuck resembles an ordinary mummy, except for the fact that he has no head and he has a face in his torso. During the game, Chuck attacks enemies by extending his face out to hit them or by jumping on them. While jumping, players can repeatedly hit the jump button to slow down Chuck's descent. Chuck may collect a skull power-up; which will sit on his shoulders like a head and can be thrown at enemies. Like a boomerang, it will return to him no matter what it hits, or where it goes, but if Chuck gets hit by an enemy or hazard, he will lose the skull. During the game, Chuck may also collect a variety of potions, which can be collected and used at the player's leisure. The potions consist of powerups such as invincibility and eliminating all enemies on screen. Chuck can also replenish health if the player successfully lands on top of a red totem pole. Chuck can also perform a crouch attack if the player holds down to crouch and slide down a narrow platform ramp and eliminate an enemy as it walks up without using his torso or skull, as well as not taking damage.

=== Differences from Magical Hat ===
Gameplay remains similar between the two games, albeit the graphics, characters, music and level designs have all been changed. Also, in Magical Hat, players are killed if they are hit once, while in Decap Attack, players can choose to have up to three hearts per life at the options menu before starting the game, with health upgrades found in certain levels of the game allowing players to have a maximum of five hearts (a total of ten hits) per life. Flagpoles that can restore health in Decap Attack increase lives in Magical Hat.

== Comic strip ==
A comic strip adaptation loosely based upon Decap Attack appeared in the U.K.'s Sonic the Comic, written and drawn by Nigel Kitching, with some episodes co-written by Richard Piers Rayner and drawn by Mike McMahon. The strip contained a very absurdist and manic sense of humour, making frequent allusions to popular culture, and followed the daily life of Chuck D. Head and the other inhabitants of Castle Frank N. Stein. Aside from Chuck, other regular characters included Head the talking skull, who would frequently get thrown at enemies much to his annoyance; the evil-minded Igor, who was constantly trying to kill Chuck; and the stereotypical mad scientist Professor Frank N. Stein, who was actually faking his German accent and was really a former choirboy from Cardiff. Max D. Cap only appeared twice in the strip: in "Starring Chuck D. Head!", the premiere storyline that roughly adapts the game's events; and in "Dead!", in which the characters are taken to Hell. In both appearances, he was partnered with his accountant Rupert, who constantly encouraged Max to be more stereotypically evil in his mannerisms. Max was described by the Professor as being one of the evilest beings alive, as he borrowed the Professor's lawnmower and never returned it.

The strip first appeared in Issue #10 of Sonic the Comic (October 1993). The strip would continue to appear in the comic on a semi-regular basis until Issue #132 (June 1998), nearly seven years after the game's release. The strip was subsequently phased out in Issue #133 to make room for reprinted Sonic the Hedgehog strips as part of Fleetway Editions' five-year reader cycle policy.

== Reception ==
Reception

Review scores
Publication	Score
GameInformer	7.5/10, 8.5/10
MegaTech	82%
Mega Action	76%
Sega Force	80%
Console XS	81%

Sega Force praised the game's graphics, saying it was "big, bold, colourfully and beautifully animated", while criticizing the gameplay as unoriginal. Console XS said that Decap Attack is the same game as Magical Flying Hat Turbo Adventure but with gothic graphics and gory killings. They also felt the game was big and very playable. MegaTech praised the game calling it "a fun-filled platform game" and saying it's identical to Magical Flying Hat Turbo Adventure but with different sprites.

Mega placed the game at #22 in their Top Mega Drive Games of All Time.

== See also ==
- Psycho Fox – Master System precursor to Decap Attack
- Kid Kool – NES precursor to Decap Attack
