= Socket (video game) =

1993 video game

- North American box art
- Developer: Vic Tokai
- Publisher: Vic Tokai
- Composers: Fumito Tamayama; Yoko Suzuki; Shigenori Masuko
- Platform: Sega Genesis
- Release: NA: 1993; JP: March 25, 1994
- Genre: Platform
- Mode: Single-player

Socket (Note: known in Japan as Time Dominator 1st (タイムドミネーター1ｓｔ)) is a 1993 platform video game developed and published by Vic Tokai for the Sega Genesis. Players control the android duck Socket in his efforts to stop the Time Dominator from stealing treasures from the past and messing with the flow of time.

== Gameplay ==
Socket is a 2D side-scrolling platform game with speed-based gameplay, similar to entries in the Sonic the Hedgehog series. At the start of a level, Socket, whose tail doubles as an extension cord, charges up with electricity, giving him the energy to move fast. Socket has a health bar, which slowly drains over time and causes death if it fully depletes. Collecting small lightning bolts scattered across levels keep him alive and moving, allowing for progression through levels. A kicking move serves as a means to attack and defeat enemies which attempt to impede his progress.

The game has seven overarching levels that are divided into three different segments: Highspeed Areas, Athletic Areas, and Labyrinth Areas. Highspeed Areas are the fast-paced levels that encourage a constant flow of speed. Athletic Areas focus more on precise platforming gameplay. Labyrinth Areas are more exploration-based, focusing on searching for an exit for a level. The completion of each set of levels culminates in a boss fight.

== Development ==
The game was developed and published by Vic Tokai.

== Plot ==
In the year 2902, the game's antagonist, the Time Dominator, creates a time machine with the intention of traveling back in time to steal treasures and artifacts. An entity tasked with watching over such disruptions, the Time Wrap Patrol, sends Socket to fix the flow of time and stop the Time Dominator.

== Reception ==
The game was criticized for too closely resembling Sonic the Hedgehog. However, Diehard GameFan's reviewers gave Socket scores around 85% and praised its gameplay, graphics, and music. Consolemania gave the game 89%, stating that while it has little originality, they find the game fun and that other gamers would feel the same.
