= Psycho Fox =

1989 video game

- Developer: Vic Tokai
- Publisher: Sega
- Director: Toshihisa Hasegawa
- Programmer: Shoji Suzuki
- Composers: Fumito Tamayama; Hiroto Kanno
- Platform: Master System
- Release: EU: December 1989; NA: May 1990
- Genre: Platform
- Mode: Single-player

Psycho Fox is a 1989 platform game developed by Vic Tokai and published by Sega for the Master System. The game was published in Brazil years after the initial release by Tec Toy as Sapo Xulé: Os Invasores do Brejo; as in Kung Fu Kid and Astro Warrior, the main character is replaced by cartoon frog Sapo Xulé.

== Plot ==
Among a group of fox priests who worship the Inari Daimyojin (Fox Deity), one evil fox named Madfox Daimyōjin infiltrated his way to the highest ranks and took over the shrine. After seizing power, Madfox corrupted the land and created hordes of creatures. One young fox (who would earn the name Psycho Fox) has been chosen by his fellow people to rid the land of this evil deity.

== Gameplay ==
The player takes control of Psycho Fox in this side-scrolling video game. Psycho Fox must get from the left-hand side of the level to the right-hand side of the level with many enemies in the way. He can use a Shinto stick to change into other characters/animals, namely a hippopotamus, a monkey or a tiger, each of which has its own special ability. The hippopotamus is slow and cannot jump very high, but can punch through special destructible blocks in the game world. The monkey can jump higher than the other creatures and the tiger can run faster. Psycho also has an ally named Bird Fly, who can be used as armor or as a boomerang. If Psycho is hit while carrying Bird Fly, Bird Fly goes away and the player does not lose a life.

== Reception ==
Reception

Review scores
Publication	Score
AllGame	3.5/5
Electronic Gaming Monthly	7/10, 7/10, 7/10, 7/10
Console XS	88%
Mean Machines	90%
S: The Sega Magazine	93%
Sega Power	93%

The game received positive reviews from critics. It was positively reviewed by Mean Machines magazine mainly for its addictiveness and good quality graphics. S: The Sega Magazine described it in 1990 as "one of the best games for the Master System". AllGame gave a rating of 3.5 out of 5 stars, noting the game being fairly lengthy and the players have the choice between two routes in each level and giving criticism to the basic action being repetitious, the controls being a little frustrating and the level design not particularly innovative concluding "Overall, this is a fun, if largely unoriginal game."

== See also ==
- Kid Kool – Vic Tokai's Nintendo Entertainment System equivalent of Psycho Fox
- Decap Attack – The spiritual successor to Psycho Fox for the Sega Genesis.
