= Kid Kool =

1988 video game

- Developer(s): Vic Tokai
- Publisher(s): Vic Tokai
- Director(s): Toshihisa Hasegawa
- Programmer(s): Tomohiko Kawamura
- Artist(s): Mayumi Sano
- Composer(s): Michiharu Hasuya
- Platform(s): Nintendo Entertainment System
- Release: JP: July 22, 1988; NA: March 1990
- Genre(s): Platform
- Mode(s): Single-player

Kid Kool and the Quest for the Seven Wonder Herbs (Note: Japanese: カケフくんのジャンプ天国 スピード地獄, Hepburn: Kakefu-kun no Janpu Tengoku Supīdo Jigoku) is a 1988 video game by Vic Tokai for the Nintendo Entertainment System. The game's main character is based on a popular Japanese child actor Kenji Sagara, known for his impersonation of baseball player Masayuki Kakefu.

== Summary ==
The second world. The character sports a cap in the Japanese version, while he lacks headgear in other versions.

Kid Kool is a platform game akin to the Mario series. There is also a small red creature, "Wicky", that the player can carry, which will eliminate enemies when thrown.

The main character is on a quest to obtain seven herbs needed to help cure a king from an illness. The game will gradually progress from "day" to "night" modes as a timer counts down, with each cycle taking one hour in play time. There are multiple endings to the game, with the ending gained based on the time taken to complete the game. These range from the king having died if the player takes more than three hours, to being given four other rewards, starting with a bag of money for the fourth best ending, a bag of gold and a high position in the kingdom for the third ending, a chest of gems and the princess for the second ending, and finally a chest of gems, the princess, and the promise to rule the kingdom for the best ending.

The Vic Tokai games Decap Attack (Magical Hat no Buttobi Tābo! Daibōken in Japan) and Psycho Fox are part of the same family of games, sharing various design similarities.
