= The Krion Conquest =

1990 video game

- Cover art Illustration by Lawrence (Lars) Fletcher
- Developer: Vic Tokai
- Publishers: Vic Tokai (NES); Genki (mobile)
- Programmer: Satoru Okada
- Composers: Kiyoshi Yokoyama; Masaki Kase
- Platforms: Family Computer, mobile phone
- Release: NES: JP: December 14, 1990; NA: January 25, 1991; Mobile: JP: January 14, 2004
- Genre: Action/Platform
- Mode: Single-player

The Krion Conquest (Note: Known in Japan as Magical Kids Doropie (まじかるキッズどろぴー, Majikaru Kizzu Doropī)) or more simply Magical Doropie (まじかるどろぴー), is a side-scrolling action-adventure video game for the Nintendo Entertainment System, developed by Vic Tokai in 1990. Later, Genki Mobile ported the game to Japanese mobile phones.

== Gameplay ==
Players control a wand-wielding character that fires different types of projectiles based on the wand type the player has selected. The wand selection is signaled by the changes in the player's outfit color. The powers included are the normal shot (red outfit), the phoenix ability (pink outfit), the freeze shot (blue outfit), the bouncing ball shot (green outfit), the shield ability (orange outfit), and the broom ability (purple outfit). The gameplay resembles Capcom's Mega Man series, while the cutscenes resemble the ones in Tecmo's NES version of Ninja Gaiden.

However, unlike the first three Mega Man titles, The Krion Conquest allows players to shoot directly upward, crouch to dodge enemies and projectiles, and charge attacks. (This action was later incorporated in Mega Man 4 and most of the later Mega Man titles that feature the charging "Mega Buster".)

== Plot ==
=== Story ===
In the year 1999, the Akudama Empire (known as the Krion Empire outside Japan) rises suddenly and attacks the Earth with an army of robots. No conventional weapon is able to stop them; they are, however, totally vulnerable to magic. A hired mercenary, Kagemaru, summons the only non-sealed witch, Doropie (known as Francesca outside Japan), to stop the Akudama Empire's offense. As she assaults the empire's hidden bases, Doropie discovers the army is led by the Machine God Emperor, whom Doropie had previously sealed away in the human world. The Emperor kidnaps Kagemaru and blackmails Doropie into breaking her seal. Kagemaru appears to die from his injuries, and Doropie sets out to stop the now-free Machine God Emperor. After a final battle aboard the Akudama Empire's space base, the dying Machine God Emperor confesses that she began the invasion in response to humanity's destruction of nature. The base explodes shortly thereafter, but not before Doropie escapes it. She is contacted by Kagemaru, who has survived the wounds previously inflicted on him, and Doropie makes her way back to Earth.

=== Characters ===
- Doropie (どろぴ～) (known outside Japan as Francesca): A witch that was summoned from a place full of demons. To save the world, she takes six magic abilities along with her and fights against the robot army corps, the Akudama Empire.
- Kagemaru (カゲマル): The boy who summoned Doropie to fight against the Akudama Empire. He holds the secret of the Heavenly Machine God Emperor, the commander of the robot army. Unlike Doropie, Kagemaru doesn't have an official name in the North American version.
- Heavenly Machine God Emperor (極楽機神帝, Gokuraku Ki Shintei): The master of the Akudama Empire robot army corps and the one responsible for the declaration of war against the whole world. She is closely connected with Doropie, who sealed her away in the human world in the past. Like Kagemaru, no official name was given to her in the North American version; an unofficial English translation patch names her Empress Elysia.

== Development and release ==
According to its designer, the development of the Magical Kids Doropie project took approximately 10 months to finish. The title was originally planned to be a licensed game based on the 1986 anime The Wonderful Wizard of Oz. However, the anime's copyrights for Japan were held by TV Tokyo, so the designers were unable to use it. They decided to develop their own basic design, which ultimately became Doropie. The name Doropie is a transliteration (or gairaigo) of Dorothy of The Wonderful Wizard of Oz anime. The rest of the Doropie design did not contain any other references to Dorothy or Oz.

Doropie's design, however, exhibited one unusual feature: the lack of eyelashes. Even though drawing eyelashes is typically used as a primary form of expression for anime-style female characters, the character designer tried to make it cute without symbolic parts. According to the main designer, her witch costume with a magical broom was the heroine's oldest design used in arcade and home video games of that time. Some developers had an opinion that "NES is for boys" and objected to having a girl as the protagonist of the game. The rest of the game's staff told the character designer that most video games during its release had male characters as protagonists because players couldn't relate to female protagonists as playable characters.

Due to the limited memory capacity of the cartridge, as well as hardware and technical problems, the final stage was cut short. It also prevented one of the designers from making magic abilities more useful in attack, defense, and movements. For instance, the "Freeze" ability was originally planned to allow players to create footholds and platforms out of enemies, while the "Shield" ability was originally planned to allow players to lay it out and allow the character to move downward.

== Release ==
The game was released in Japan for the Family Computer on December 14, 1990.

The North American version of this game, The Krion Conquest, excluded some features from its Japanese version, Magical Kids Doropie. Due to the perceived popularity of difficult video games in North America, Vic Tokai removed the "continue" feature. The most obvious difference between the original Japanese release and the North American version is the removal of every cutscene except the slightly modified introduction sequence and several redrawn in-game graphic elements. No official English names were given to other characters. The circled hexagram (resembling the Star of David) at the end of each stage in the Japanese version was removed in the North American version because Nintendo of America did not allow religious content in video games at the time.

A sequel was planned, but Nintendo had just released the Super Nintendo Entertainment System. The new developer kit was too expensive for the designers to use to create the sequel.

Fourteen years later, Genki Mobile released the mobile phone version on January 14, 2004, exclusively in Japan through the Vodafone service. Its difficulty from the original was altered in the mobile phone version, allowing players who found the original too difficult to easily beat the mobile phone version. Other differences from the NES version included the shrinking of several graphics to fit the small screens of mobile phones and the introduction of two new modes: "Easy" and "Upload".

== Reception ==
Reception

Review score
Publication	Score
Hippon Super!	5/10

Famitsu gave it a score of 23 out of 40.

1up.com noted the similarities to Mega Man, but stated that it wasn't as fun.
