= Tokai Communications =

Japanese telecommunications company

- Type: Operating subsidiary
- Traded as: JASDAQ: 2306
- Industry: Telecommunications
- Founded: 18 March 1977; 49 years ago
- Headquarters: TOKAI Building, Shizuoka, Shizuoka Prefecture, Japan
- Revenue: ¥41,586 million (2016)
- Total equity: ¥12,148 million (as of April 1, 2017)
- Number of employees: 1,197 (as of April 1, 2019)
- Parent: Tokai Holdings Corporation
- Website: www.tokai-com.co.jp

Tokai Communications Corporation Inc (known as Vic Tokai Corporation until 2011) is a telecommunications company in Japan providing DSL services and network solutions. Its headquarters are in the Tokai Building (TOKAIビル, Tōkai Biru) in Aoi-ku, Shizuoka, Shizuoka Prefecture. In North America, it is best known for its video games during the late 1980s and throughout the 1990s. In the US, they published games for the Nintendo Entertainment System, the Game Boy, the Super Nintendo Entertainment System, the Nintendo 64, the Sega Genesis, the Sega CD, the Sega Saturn, and the PlayStation.

== History ==
Vic Tokai was founded on March 18, 1977 (49 years ago) as Yaizu Cable Vision Co, a CATV service provider. The following year, in 1978, it adopted the name of Vic Tokai. The "Vic" in Vic Tokai's name stood for Valuable Information & Communication. The "Tokai" part is the name of its then parent company, Tokai Corporation, a Japanese natural gas utility founded in 1950.

Vic Tokai began selling data processing services and computer hardware in April 1982, a sector that until then was handled by parent Tokai Corporation. In 1983, it began developing online and graphics applications for office computers.

In April 1987, parent company Tokai corporation handed its remaining computer-related branches, such as electronic calculation and operational sections, to Vic Tokai, thus making the latter company able to handle data processing operations independently. Vic Tokai expanded in 1988 when it acquired another telecommunication company. The company also launched its first system consulting software the same year.

The 1990s saw a number of new products by Vic Tokai available to the Japanese market. In 1993, Vic Tokai introduced the first version of its long running (and still existing) lineup of network solution products called "TOP-VENUS". Later, Vic Tokai released its own Electronic Data Interchange package known as JFT (Java File Transfer) in 1996. Then in 1998 Vic Tokai developed its "Knowledge Stage" lineup, which is dedicated to helping companies develop their Intranet.

In April 2000, Vic Tokai merged with another CATV company that provides Internet connection services. As a result, Vic Tokai itself immediately became an Internet service provider, and a year later, in April 2001, it entered the ADSL market. Vic Tokai would soon establish a partnership with Japanese peer-to-peer Internet exchange company JPIX.

As the company continued to grow, Vic Tokai earned its place in the market listing of the JASDAQ as of June 2002.

By March 2005, Vic Tokai had completed the build-out of its own high-capacity optical fiber network infrastructure between Tokyo and Nagoya to improve network support for its Internet service customers and enterprises. Vic Tokai continued its expansion in October 2005 when it merged again, this time with Tokai Broadband Communications, enabling Vic Tokai to enter the mobile broadband industry.

On April 1, 2011, Vic Tokai and (then) parent company Tokai Corporation jointly created Tokai Holdings Corporation, a new shell entity to oversee the operation of both companies (as well as other subsidiaries). In October of that year, Vic Tokai was renamed Tokai Communications following its absorption of Tokai Corporation's information and telecommunications business.

In April 2012, the CATV operations of Tokai Communications were spun off into a new company called Tokai Cable Network.

== Video games ==
Vic Tokai was, from 1984 to 1997, a video game developer for home and arcade video games. The company also published games from developers like Kronos Digital Entertainment. The now defunct Vic Tokai Inc division in Torrance, California was tasked with localizing games in North America.

All of Vic Tokai's internally developed video games were created with Sunseibu Entertainment, a sister company from the Tokai Group. Sunseibu also had some involvement with the Aicom-developed Vic tokai game The Mafat Conspiracy.

The Vic Tokai/Sunseibu duo started in 1984 by developing arcade games for Sega. Vic Tokai/Sunseibu expanded in the home market by developing video games for Nintendo consoles (published by Vic Tokai) and for Sega consoles (published by Sega themselves). In the early 1990s, Vic Tokai, which by then had always self-published video games only for Nintendo consoles, became a Sega licensee for the first time.

Title	Date	Developer	Platform(s)	Region(s)
Aerostar	1991	Vic Tokai	Game Boy	Worldwide
Aigiina no Yogen: From the Legend of Balubalouk	1986	Vic Tokai	Nintendo Entertainment System, Commodore 64	Worldwide
Aigina's Prophecy	1986	Vic Tokai	Nintendo Entertainment System	Japan
All-Pro Basketball (Zenbei!! Pro Basketball in Japan)	1989	Aicom	Nintendo Entertainment System	North America, Japan
Battle Mania (Trouble Shooter in North America)	1991, 1992	Vic Tokai	Mega Drive/Genesis	Japan, North America
Battle Mania Daiginjou	1993	Vic Tokai	Mega Drive/Genesis	Japan
Block Gal	1987	Vic Tokai	Arcade	Japan
Bump 'n' Jump	1988	Data East and SAS Sakata	Nintendo Entertainment System	North America
Chester Field: Ankoku Shin e no Chosen	1987	Vic Tokai	Nintendo Entertainment System, Commodore 64	Worldwide
Clash at Demonhead	1989, 1990	Vic Tokai	Nintendo Entertainment System	Japan, North America
Conflict	1989, 1990	Vic Tokai	Nintendo Entertainment System	Japan, North America
Columns 3	1993	Sega	Sega Genesis	North America
Criticom	1995–1997	Kronos Digital Entertainment	PlayStation, Saturn	Worldwide
Daedalian Opus (Bouken! Puzzle Road in Japan)	1990	Vic Tokai	Game Boy	North America, Japan
Dark Rift (Space Dynamites in Japan)	1997	Kronos Digital Entertainment	Nintendo 64, Windows	Worldwide
Dark Seed	1994	Cyberdreams	Mega CD/Sega CD	Cancelled
Decap Attack	1991	Vic Tokai	Mega Drive/Genesis	North America, Europe
Diggers 2: Extractors	1995	Nova Spring	Super NES	North America
Flink	1994	Psygnosis	Mega CD/Sega CD	North America
The Gene Machine	1996	Divide By Zero	MS-DOS	North America
Golgo 13: Top Secret Episode	1988	Vic Tokai	Nintendo Entertainment System	Japan, North America
Imperium (Kidou Soukou Dion in Japan)	1992	Jorudan	Super NES	North America, Japan
Kick Off 3: European Challenge	1994	Anco Software	Mega Drive/Genesis	Europe
Kid Kool (Kakefu Kun no Jump Tengoku in Japan)	1988, 1990	Vic Tokai	Nintendo Entertainment System	North America, Japan
King Salmon: The Big Catch	1992	Hot-B and Sage's Creation	Mega Drive\Genesis	North America
The Krion Conquest (Magical Kids Doropie in Japan)	1990, 1991	Vic Tokai	Nintendo Entertainment System	North America, Japan
Laplace no Ma	1995	Hummingbird Soft	Super NES	Japan
Lock On (Super Air Diver in Japan)	1993	Copya Systems	Super NES	North America
Lucle	1994	Vic Tokai	Game Boy	Europe, Japan
The Mafat Conspiracy (Golgo 13 The Riddle of Icarus in Japan)	1990	Aicom	Nintendo Entertainment System	North America, Japan
Mansion of Hidden Souls	1993	System Sacom	Mega CD/Sega CD	North America
Psycho Fox	1989	Vic Tokai	Master System	North America, Europe
S.O.S.	1994	Human Entertainment	Super NES	North America
The Scroll	1995	Vic Tokai	MS-DOS	Worldwide
Secret Ties (Master Thief Sugar in Japan)	1991 (unreleased)	Graphic Research	Nintendo Entertainment System	North America, Japan
Shien's Revenge	1994	Almanic	Super NES	North America
Shinseiki Odysselya	1993	Vic Tokai	Super NES	Japan
Shinseiki Odysselya 2	1995	Vic Tokai	Super NES	Japan
Shinobi Legions	1995	Sega	Saturn	North America
SilverLoad	1996	Millennium Interactive	PlayStation, MS-DOS	North America
Socket: Time Dominator	1993, 1994	Vic Tokai	Mega Drive/Genesis	North America, Japan
Super Conflict	1993	Vic Tokai	Super NES	North America
Time Slip	1993	The Sales Curve	Super NES	North America
Top Gear 2	1994	Gremlin Interactive	Mega Drive/Genesis	North America
Totsuzen! Machoman	1988	Aicom	Nintendo Entertainment System	Japan
Whip Rush	1990	Vic Tokai	Mega Drive/Genesis	Worldwide
