= IC socket =

IC socket may refer to:

- Ball grid array, a packaging technology in microelectronics
- CPU socket, an IC socket for processors
- DIP socket (a.k.a. DIL socket), a socket for ICs in dual-in-line package
- Surface-mount technology
- ZIF socket, zero insertion force IC socket
