= Kokuga =

2012 video game

- Japanese box art
- Developer: G.rev
- Publisher: G.rev
- Director: Hiroshi Iuchi
- Composer: Manabu Namiki
- Platform: Nintendo 3DS
- Release: JP: August 27, 2012; NA: June 27, 2013; EU: July 11, 2013
- Genre: Shoot 'em up

Kokuga (コクガ) is a shoot 'em up game released by G.rev in 2012 for the Nintendo 3DS. It was directed by Hiroshi Iuchi, famous for his seminal shmups Radiant Silvergun and Ikaruga. Unlike many worldwide releases, the game wasn't released in Canada and the developer was only notified that they would not be able to, late in the preparation process.

== Gameplay ==
The game puts the player in command of a tank that must shoot enemies in succession.

== Development and release ==
The game was released in North America, excluding Canada, in June 2013, and July 2013 in Europe. The developer was surprised by the failure to release in Canada and did not know if, or when, it would release there.

== Reception ==
Reception

Aggregate score
Aggregator	Score
Metacritic	77/100

Review scores
Publication	Score
Eurogamer	8/10
Nintendo Life	8/10
Nintendo World Report	8.5/10
Official Nintendo Magazine	71%

Kokuga received positive reviews from critics upon release. On Metacritic, the game holds a score of 77/100 based on 14 reviews, indicating "generally favorable reviews".
