= Dynamite Headdy =

1994 video game

- North American Genesis box art
- Developer: Treasure (Note: Ported to Game Gear and Master System by Minato Giken)
- Publisher: Sega
- Director: Hiroshi Aso
- Producer: Koichi Kimura
- Programmer: Masato Maegawa
- Artists: Koichi Kimura; Makoto Ogino; Kaname Shindoh
- Composers: Katsuhiko Suzuki; Yasuko; Koji Yamada; Aki Hata; Norio Hanzawa
- Platforms: Sega Genesis/Mega Drive, Game Gear, Master System
- Release: August 5, 1994: Genesis/Mega Drive; JP: August 5, 1994; NA: September 28, 1994; EU: October 28, 1994 Game Gear; JP: August 5, 1994; NA: September 1994; EU: November 1994 Master System; BR: 1995
- Genre: Platform
- Mode: Single-player

Dynamite Headdy (Note: In Japanese: Dainamaito Heddī (ダイナマイトヘッディー)) is a 1994 platform video game developed by Treasure and published by Sega for the Sega Genesis. The game follows a puppet named Headdy in his efforts to stop an evil puppet king from taking over his world. Headdy can throw his head at enemies to defeat them and use it to pull himself to various areas and move objects. The player can find a wide variety of "heads" which act as power-ups that provide different effects and alter gameplay.

Dynamite Headdy received positive reviews from critics, who highlighted the game's originality and creativity in distinguishing it among other games in the platform genre. They also commended Treasure for demonstrating their technical expertise with impressive graphical effects and building on the success of their earlier game Gunstar Heroes (1993). Dynamite Headdy has been cited as one of the best games on the Genesis, and has since been included in multiple compilations of Genesis games. An 8-bit port was released for Game Gear, which itself served as the basis for a Master System port released in Brazil.

== Gameplay ==
Headdy fighting with Trouble Bruin early in the game

Dynamite Headdy is a platform game in which the player controls Headdy, a puppet with a detachable head. The story follows Headdy in his adventures to save his world from the evil puppet King Dark Demon, who is transforming all the puppets of the world into his evil minions. To succeed, Headdy must overcome the King's army, which features the likes of Trouble Bruin (Note: Known as Maruyama (マルヤマ) in Japan.) and the key masters which serve as stage bosses. Headdy can jump and throw his head in any direction to attack enemies. His head can also be used to grab hooks and pull himself up to other platforms. Headdy's health is represented by a spotlight in the corner of the screen which changes colors. If the player does not pick up restorative items to heal themselves after suffering damage from enemies, they will lose a life.

During his adventure, Headdy will find power-ups which change the design and function of his head. These 17 power-ups range from increasing damage, such as spinning fireballs around his head, to providing invincibility, restoring health, increasing speed, etc. Some of these power-ups last for only a short time. Other than heads, the player can also find health restoratives, extra points, and extra lives throughout the levels. By finding the Liberty Head, players can enter a Bonus Stage in which the player must shoot basketballs into the correct hoops. Unlike other platform games where falling into a bottomless pit results instant death, if Headdy falls off, he will bounce back up which allows the player to put him back on a platform, though Headdy will still sustain some damage.

== Development and release ==
After developing Gunstar Heroes, Treasure was divided into four teams to work on four separate projects: Alien Soldier, Light Crusader, Yū Yū Hakusho Makyō Tōitsusen, and Dynamite Headdy. Development of Dynamite Headdy started in August 1993. Inspiration for the game came from Koichi Kimura, who wanted to work on an original project. Up to this point in his five-year career, Kimura had only worked on projects using the pre-existing works of others. Kimura lead development, and president of Treasure, Masato Maegawa, served as head programmer.

Kimura designed Dynamite Headdy to be commercially viable. He wanted the main character to attack with a part of its body, so he felt a puppet that could throw its head would be appealing. Not wanting Headdy to be a stereotypical lone hero, Kimura added support characters that appear in every stage. The game's visual design was inspired by Western animation and the work of film director Terry Gilliam. After deciding to publish a localized version for overseas markets, Maegawa was told by Sega of America to make the game more difficult. This was because Sega did not want customers completing the game too easily on rental. Maegawa happily obliged, and the North American release was made about twice as difficult. In addition to changes in difficulty, most of the dialogue in the game was removed, and several of the character and boss sprites were changed.

Dynamite Headdy was originally released in Japan on August 5, 1994 for the Sega Genesis, with North American and European releases following in September and October respectively. A port was released for the Game Gear, and a Master System port based on the Game Gear version was released exclusively in Brazil. A 32X conversion was planned but canceled. The game was included along with Gunstar Heroes and Alien Soldier in Sega Ages 2500: Gunstar Heroes Treasure Box, a compilation released for the PlayStation 2 in 2006 in Japan. The compilation includes all versions of Dynamite Headdy released on all three Sega platforms across all regions. The game saw a digital re-release on the Wii via the Virtual Console in July 2007. It was also included in Sonic's Ultimate Genesis Collection for Xbox 360 and PlayStation 3, and was released on Windows through Steam on May 2, 2012. In 2018, it was included in the multi-platform compilation Sega Genesis Classics. In 2021, Dynamite Headdy was added to the Nintendo Classics service.

== Reception ==
Reception (Genesis)

Review scores
Publication	Score	
Publication	Game Gear	Sega Genesis
Computer and Video Games		92/100
Electronic Gaming Monthly	9/10, 7/10, 6/10, 8/10	8/10, 8/10, 6/10, 8/10, 8/10
Famitsu	7/10, 5/10, 6/10, 5/10	7/10, 7/10, 7/10, 7/10
GamesMaster		76/100
Mean Machines Sega		93/100
Next Generation		4/5
Game Players		96%

Dynamite Headdy received critical acclaim, with some believing it to be one of the best games on the Genesis. Journalists repeatedly highlighted the game's creativity as a strong point. Rik Skews of Computer and Video Games said it "breathes new life" into the platform genre and stood up to the likes of the Sonic series. The staff at Mean Machines Sega found the game innovative and liked how each stage introduced new concepts to keep gameplay fresh. Tim Tucker at GamesMaster believed that Treasure was doing more innovation in the genre than any of its rivals. In addition to the game's originality, critics praised Treasure's programming expertise and Dynamite Headdy's technical prowess. The staff of Electronic Gaming Monthly complimented the game's visual effects and colorful stages. Tucker said "Dynamite Headdy is full of classic Treasure overstatement" and cited the impressive colors, big explosions, large sprites, and rapidly changing backgrounds—which all together were perhaps a little too overwhelming. The Mean Machines staff believed that Dynamite Headdy followed in the footsteps of Treasure's previous games and therefore confirmed the studio's technical expertise. The gameplay drew some criticism, with Tucker finding it somewhat disjointed and "patchy" and Mean Machines stating that it takes a few stages to truly find its footing.

Critics found the Game Gear port to be well done given the system's less powerful technology. Electronic Gaming Monthly staff called it one of the best portable action games. Richard Leadbetter of Sega Magazine believed that since much of the Genesis version's playability came from the system's technical capabilities, the Game Gear version suffers in that sense, but still believed Treasure was able to create a fun 8-bit port.

In retrospective reviews of the Genesis version, Dynamite Headdy has continued to receive considerable praise. Critics agreed that the game is excellent despite not receiving the same legendary status as some of Treasure's other works such as Gunstar Heroes, Ikaruga, and Radiant Silvergun. Lucas M. Thomas of IGN said the game is overload on the eyes, but it makes sense with respect to Treasure's chaotic design. Frank Provo of GameSpot noted the game's impressive graphical effects, large bosses, and bizarre premise providing the same level of excitement as Gunstar Heroes. Damien McFarren of Nintendo Life called it one of the best Treasure games of the Genesis era and one of the best platformers on the system.
