= Sega Genesis Mini =

Home video game console

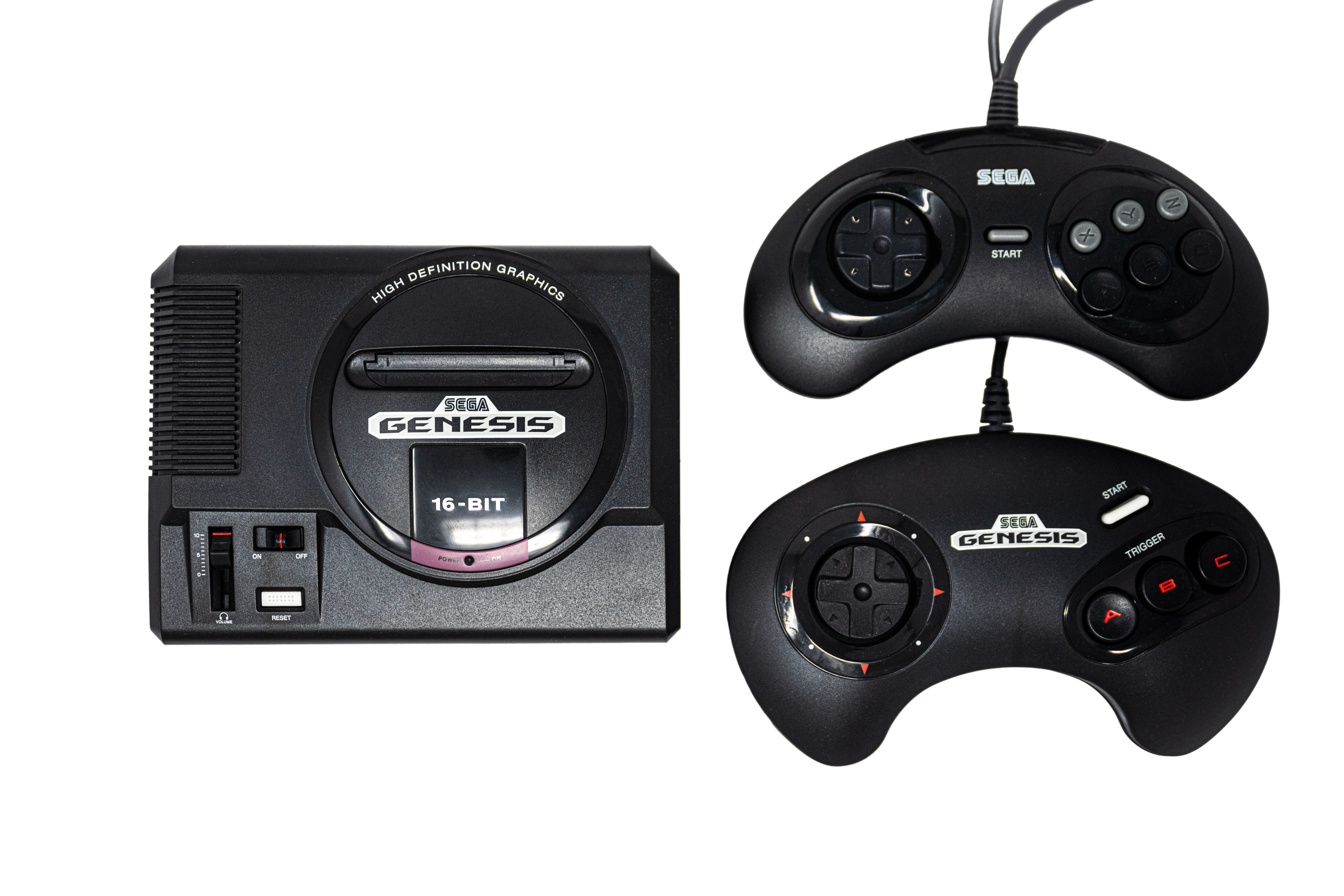
- The Sega Genesis Mini with official 6 button and 3 button controllers
- Also known as: Mega Drive Mini
- Developer: Sega, M2
- Manufacturer: Sega
- Type: Dedicated home video game console
- Released: WW: September 19, 2019; EU, ME: October 4, 2019
- Lifespan: 2019–2024
- Introductory price: US$79.99; CA$99.99; ¥9,980; A$139.95; £69.99; €79.99; ₩79,800
- Media: Internal flash memory
- Operating system: Linux kernel
- System on a chip: ZUIKI Z2713, Quad-Core ARM Cortex-A7
- Memory: 256 MB of DDR3 RAM
- Storage: 512 MB NAND Flash TSOP48
- Graphics: Mali-400 MP
- Controller input: 2 controller ports
- Power: AXP223
- Dimensions: 154 mm × 39 mm × 116 mm
- Successor: Sega Genesis Mini 2

The Sega Genesis Mini, known as the Mega Drive Mini in regions outside of North America, is a dedicated console modeled on the Sega Genesis. The Mini emulates the original console's 16-bit hardware, and includes 42 games made available through emulation software by M2. It was released in North America and Japan in September 2019 and in Europe and the Middle East in October 2019. A follow-up, Sega Genesis Mini 2, was released in October 2022 and includes 60 games from the Genesis and Sega CD.

== Hardware and accessories ==
The Mini is half the size of the original Sega Genesis. Inside the unit is an ARM-based SOC ZUIKI Z7213 and 512 MB of flash memory., which includes four ARM Cortex-A7 central processing cores and an ARM Mali 400 MP2 graphics processing unit. It includes 512 MB of flash storage and 256 MB of DDR3 memory. It includes either one or two (dependent on region's bundle options) full-size replica controllers that connect through USB (thus original controllers are incompatible), a USB-to-Micro-B power cable (USB AC adapter in North America), and an HDMI video cable. There are separate releases for North America, Europe, Asia and Japan, as the Mini reproduces the original console's decal and color variations in those regions. Korea is a slight exception, as the Mega Drive was released there by Samsung as the Super Gam*Boy and Super Aladdin Boy; none of these names appear on the Korean Mini.

All of the games have a save state feature to pause and resume progress and can be played in either the original 4:3 aspect ratio with optional wallpapers or stretched to 16:9 widescreen with HUD elements modified to fit onto the screen. Certain games have regional variants that can be accessed by changing the system's language settings (e.g. switching the system language from English to Japanese will change Dr. Robotnik's Mean Bean Machine into Puyo Puyo.)

The North American and European models of the Genesis Mini come bundled with two three-button controllers, while the Japanese model comes with two six-button controllers. Officially licensed six-button controllers made specifically for the Mini are also sold separately in North America and Europe. Official model accessories of a miniature Mega-CD, a miniature Super 32X, a miniature Sonic & Knuckles lock-on Genesis cartridge, and a miniature Sonic the Hedgehog standard Mega Drive cartridge were also sold separately in Japan. Miniature replicas of the Sega CD and Sega 32X in both the North American and European versions were also manufactured but only distributed to select members of the media.

The Mini 2 system is modeled after the Mega Drive 2 variant of the original console and comes bundled with over 50 games and a single six-button controller in all regions. It uses the same SOC chip as the first Mini, albeit with more memory and storage. In addition to the first Mini's emulation features, the Mini 2 includes the option to emulate the sound outputs of the original Genesis or Genesis 2. Like with the original Mega Drive Mini, a set of model accessories consisting of a miniature Mega-CD 2, a miniature Virtua Racing cartridge, and a miniature Sonic CD disc was released in Japan alongside the system, including compatibility parts with the first Mega Drive Mini and its accessories. Additionally, a USB-powered Cyber Stick controller based on the original flight stick controller produced by Sharp was released alongside the system in Japan and provides analog input for After Burner II, Night Striker, and Starblade.

== Games ==
=== Sega Genesis Mini ===
The Sega Genesis Mini features 40 Sega Genesis games, with the selection varying depending on the region. In addition to these titles, the game includes two bonus games, Darius and Tetris, which are new conversions made for the Mini system that were previously never released for the original console.

Games	Copyright	NA/EU	Japan	Asia
Alex Kidd in the Enchanted Castle	Sega	Yes	No	No
Alien Soldier	Sega	No	No	Yes
Alisia Dragoon	Game Arts	Yes	Yes	Yes
Altered Beast	Sega	Yes	No	No
Beyond Oasis	Sega	Yes	Yes	Yes
Castle of Illusion Starring Mickey Mouse	Sega/Disney	Yes	No	Yes
Castlevania: Bloodlines	Konami	Yes	Yes	Yes
Columns	Sega	Yes	Yes	Yes
Comix Zone	Sega	Yes	Yes	Yes
Contra: Hard Corps	Konami	Yes	Yes	Yes
Darius (Note: A newly developed Genesis port of the arcade version created specifically for the Mini.)	Taito	Yes	Yes	Yes
Dr. Robotnik's Mean Bean Machine (Note: If the system language is set to Japanese, Traditional Chinese, or Korean, the game is replaced with Puyo Puyo.)	Sega	Yes	No	Yes
Dyna Brothers 2	Sega	No	Yes	No
Dynamite Headdy	Sega	Yes	Yes	No
Earthworm Jim	Interplay Entertainment	Yes	No	No
Ecco the Dolphin	Sega	Yes	No	No
Eternal Champions	Sega	Yes	No	No
Game no Kanzume Otokuyou (Note: Contains the following Sega Meganet games: 16t, Aworg: Hero in the Sky, Fatal Labyrinth, Flicky, Hyper Marbles, Ikasuze! Koi no Doki Doki Penguin Land MD, Medal City, Paddle Fighter, Putter Golf, Pyramid Magic, Robot Battler, and Teddy Boy Blues.)	Sega	No	Yes	Yes
Ghouls 'n Ghosts	Capcom	Yes	Yes	Yes
Golden Axe	Sega	Yes	Yes	Yes
Gunstar Heroes	Sega	Yes	Yes	Yes
The Hybrid Front	Sega	No	Yes	No
Kid Chameleon	Sega	Yes	No	No
Landstalker: The Treasures of King Nole	Sega	Yes	Yes	Yes
Langrisser II	Extreme	No	Yes	Yes
Light Crusader	Sega	Yes	No	No
Lord Monarch	Nihon Falcom	No	Yes	No
Madō Monogatari I	Sega/D4 Enterprise	No	Yes	No
Mega Man: The Wily Wars	Capcom	Yes	Yes	Yes
Monster World IV	Sega/LAT	Yes	Yes	Yes
MUSHA	Sega/M2	No	Yes	Yes
OutRun 2019	Sega	No	No	Yes
Party Quiz Mega Q	Sega	No	Yes	No
Phantasy Star IV: The End of the Millennium	Sega	Yes	Yes	Yes
Powerball	Bandai Namco	No	Yes	Yes
Puyo Puyo 2	Sega	No	Yes	Yes
Puzzle & Action: Tant-R	Sega	No	Yes	Yes
Rent a Hero	Sega	No	Yes	No
The Revenge of Shinobi	Sega	No	Yes	Yes
Road Rash II	Electronic Arts	Yes	Yes	Yes
Shining Force	Sega	Yes	Yes	Yes
Shining Force II	Sega	No	No	Yes
Shinobi III: Return of the Ninja Master	Sega	Yes	No	No
Slap Fight MD	Tatsujin	No	Yes	Yes
Snow Bros.	Tatsujin	No	Yes	Yes
Sonic Spinball	Sega	Yes	No	No
Sonic the Hedgehog	Sega	Yes	No	Yes
Sonic the Hedgehog 2	Sega	Yes	Yes	Yes
Space Harrier II	Sega	Yes	Yes	Yes
Street Fighter II': Special Champion Edition	Capcom	Yes	Yes	No
Streets of Rage 2	Sega	Yes	Yes	Yes
Strider	Capcom	Yes	No	Yes
Super Fantasy Zone	Sunsoft/Sega	Yes	Yes	Yes
Sword of Vermilion	Sega	No	No	Yes
Target Earth	Extreme	No	Yes	Yes
Tetris (Note: A new port based on Sega's 1988 arcade version, not to be confused with the extremely rare 1989 Mega Drive version.)	Sega/The Tetris Company	Yes	Yes	Yes
Thunder Force III	Sega	Yes	Yes	Yes
ToeJam & Earl	ToeJam & Earl Productions	Yes	No	No
Vectorman	Sega	Yes	No	No
Virtua Fighter 2	Sega	Yes	No	No
Wonder Boy in Monster World	Sega/LAT	Yes	No	Yes
World of Illusion Starring Mickey Mouse and Donald Duck	Sega/Disney	Yes	Yes	Yes
Yu Yu Hakusho Makyō Tōitsusen	Sega	No	Yes	No

=== Sega Genesis Mini 2 ===
The Sega Genesis Mini 2 features 53 games released for both the Genesis and the Sega CD add-on peripheral. Like the original Mini, the Mini 2 also features seven additional games that were never released for the Genesis, including both unreleased games and new arcade ports.

Games	Copyright	Platform	NA/EU	Japan
Aah! Harimanada	Sega	Genesis	No	Yes
After Burner II	Sega	Genesis	Yes	Yes
Alien Soldier	Sega	Genesis	Yes	Yes
Atomic Runner Chelnov	Paon DP	Genesis	Yes	Yes
Bonanza Bros.	Sega	Genesis	Yes	Yes
Captain Tsubasa	Koei Tecmo	Sega CD	No	Yes
ClayFighter	Interplay Entertainment	Genesis	Yes	No
Columns III: Revenge of Columns	Sega	Genesis	No	Yes
Crusader of Centy	Sega	Genesis	Yes	Yes
Desert Strike: Return to the Gulf	Electronic Arts	Genesis	Yes	No
Devi & Pii (Note: A title that was originally developed in 1992 but never released for the original console.)	Sega	Genesis	Yes	Yes
Earthworm Jim 2	Interplay Entertainment	Genesis	Yes	No
Ecco the Dolphin	Sega	Sega CD	Yes	Yes
Ecco: The Tides of Time	Sega	Sega CD	Yes	Yes
Elemental Master	Sega	Genesis	Yes	No
Fantasy Zone	Sega	Genesis	Yes	Yes
Fatal Fury 2	SNK	Genesis	Yes	Yes
Final Fight CD	Capcom	Sega CD	Yes	Yes
Gain Ground	Sega	Genesis	Yes	Yes
Gambler Jiko Chuushinha (Note: Subtitled Katayama Masayuki's Mahjong Dojo)	Game Arts	Genesis	No	Yes
Golden Axe II	Sega	Genesis	Yes	No
Granada	Edia	Genesis	Yes	Yes
Hellfire	Tatsujin	Genesis	Yes	No
Herzog Zwei	Sega	Genesis	Yes	No
Honō no Tōkyūji: Dodge Danpei	Sega	Genesis	No	Yes
Lunar: Eternal Blue	Game Arts	Sega CD	No	Yes
Lunar: The Silver Star	Game Arts	Sega CD	No	Yes
Magical Taruruto-kun	Sega	Genesis	No	Yes
Mahou no Shoujo: Silky Lip	Edia	Sega CD	No	Yes
Mansion of Hidden Souls	Sega	Sega CD	Yes	Yes
Megapanel	Bandai Namco	Genesis	No	Yes
Midnight Resistance	G-Mode	Genesis	Yes	Yes
Nadia: The Secret of Blue Water	Bandai Namco	Genesis	No	Yes
Night Striker	Taito	Sega CD	Yes	Yes
Night Trap	Hasbro	Sega CD	Yes	Yes
The Ninja Warriors	Taito	Sega CD	Yes	Yes
The Ooze	Sega	Genesis	Yes	No
Out Run	Sega	Genesis	Yes	Yes
OutRunners	Sega	Genesis	Yes	No
Party Quiz Mega Q 2022 (Note: Updated titles based on the original Party Quiz Mega Q. Mega Q 2022 features trivia up to the year 2022 whereas Sega Q features trivia based on Sega titles.)	Sega	Genesis	No	Yes
Party Quiz Sega Q	Sega	Genesis	No	Yes
Phantasy Star II (Note: Modified version of original game, contains an added easy mode.)	Sega	Genesis	Yes	Yes
Popful Mail	Nihon Falcom	Sega CD	No	Yes
Populous	Electronic Arts	Genesis	Yes	Yes
Puzzle & Action: Ichidant-R	Sega	Genesis	No	Yes
Rainbow Islands Extra	Taito	Genesis	Yes	No
Ranger X	Sega	Genesis	Yes	Yes
The Revenge of Shinobi	Sega	Genesis	Yes	No
Ristar	Sega	Genesis	Yes	No
Robo Aleste	Sega/M2	Sega CD	Yes	Yes
Rolling Thunder 2	Bandai Namco	Genesis	Yes	No
Romance of the Three Kingdoms III: Dragon of Destiny	Koei Tecmo	Genesis / Sega CD	No	Yes
Sewer Shark	Hasbro	Sega CD	Yes	No
Shadow Dancer: The Secret of Shinobi	Sega	Genesis	Yes	No
Shin Megami Tensei	Atlus	Sega CD	No	Yes
Shining Force CD	Sega	Sega CD	Yes	Yes
Shining Force II	Sega	Genesis	Yes	No
Shining in the Darkness	Sega	Genesis	Yes	Yes
Silpheed	Game Arts	Sega CD	Yes	Yes
Sonic 3D Blast	Sega	Genesis	Yes	No
Sonic CD (Note: Players can choose between the North American and European versions of Sonic CD (Japanese and North American versions in the Japanese language setting), which each have different soundtracks, upon selecting the game in the menu.)	Sega	Sega CD	Yes	Yes
Sorcerian	Nihon Falcom	Genesis	No	Yes
Space Harrier II (Note: An enhanced port of Space Harrier II featuring enhanced sprite scaling and smoother framerates. A new Genesis conversion of the original Space Harrier is also included, accessed by selecting Space Harrier II from the game selection menu.)	Sega	Genesis	Yes	Yes
Spatter	Sega	Genesis	Yes	Yes
Splatterhouse 2	Bandai Namco	Genesis	Yes	Yes
Star Cruiser	Extreme	Genesis	No	Yes
Star Mobile (Note: A Mega Drive port of Star Mobile originally released for the X68000 computer in 1991, which finished development in 1992 but was never released.)	Mindware	Genesis	Yes	Yes
Starblade	Bandai Namco	Sega CD	No	Yes
Streets of Rage 3	Sega	Genesis	Yes	No
Super Hang-On	Sega	Genesis	Yes	No
Super Locomotive	Sega	Genesis	Yes	Yes
Super Street Fighter II: The New Challengers	Capcom	Genesis	Yes	Yes
Tenka Fubu: Eiyūtachi no Hōkō	Game Arts	Sega CD	No	Yes
Thunder Force IV	Sega	Genesis	Yes	Yes
ToeJam & Earl in Panic on Funkotron	ToeJam & Earl Productions	Genesis	Yes	No
Tōgi Ō: King Colossus	Sega	Genesis	No	Yes
Truxton	Tatsujin	Genesis	Yes	Yes
Vectorman 2	Sega	Genesis	Yes	No
Viewpoint (Note: Viewpoint is considered a bonus game in the Japanese version of the Mega Drive Mini 2 because the Genesis port was not released in Japan before its inclusion.)	Sega	Genesis	Yes	Yes
Virtua Racing	Sega	Genesis	Yes	Yes
VS Puyo Puyo Sun (Note: A Genesis port of the versus mode from Puyo Puyo Sun, originally released for the arcades and the Sega Saturn.)	Sega	Genesis	Yes	Yes
Warsong	Extreme	Genesis	Yes	No
Wondermega Collection (Note: Contains the following Sega Meganet games: Flicky, Paddle Fighter, Pyramid Magic, and Quiz Scramble.)	Sega	Sega CD	No	Yes

== Production and release ==
The Sega Genesis Mini was first announced at the Sega Fes show in April 2018. The announcement was part of a trend of releasing smaller versions of retro video game consoles. It was delayed in September, missing the console's 30th-anniversary window, when Sega dropped its partnership with AtGames, whose 2017 Sega Genesis Flashback was critically panned for its production quality. Instead of using AtGames's Flashback software on a Japan-exclusive Mini, Sega handled the entire production of the system. The system was released worldwide on September 19, 2019, except in Europe and the Middle East, where it was delayed until October 4, 2019, due to distribution issues.

M2, who previously collaborated with Sega on the Sega Ages and Sega 3D Classics Collection series, produced the Mini's ports. Sega emphasized first-party production quality in its marketing for the Mini, as the company returns to the hardware business after last producing the Sega Dreamcast in 2001. The menu music was written by Yuzo Koshiro, who was also the composer of the compilation's Beyond Oasis, Streets of Rage 2, and The Revenge of Shinobi. The Sega Genesis Mini had sold over 300,000 units by the end of March 2020.

A followup, the Sega Genesis Mini 2, was released worldwide on October 27, 2022. Koshiro returned to write the menu music.
