= Alien Soldier =

1995 video game

- Japanese cover art
- Developer: Treasure
- Publisher: Sega
- Producer: Hideyuki Suganami
- Programmers: Hideyuki Suganami; Keiji Fujita; Masato Maegawa; Fukuryuu
- Artists: Kaname Shindoh; Hiroshi Iuchi; Tsunehisa Kanagae; Takehiro Shiga
- Composer: Norio Hanzawa
- Platform: Mega Drive
- Release: JP: February 24, 1995; PAL: May 26, 1995; NA: 1995 (Sega Channel)
- Genre: Run and gun
- Mode: Single-player

Alien Soldier (Note: In Japanese: Eirian Sorujā (エイリアンソルジャー)) is a 1995 run and gun video game developed by Treasure and published by Sega for the Mega Drive. Retail copies were released in Japan and PAL territories while in North America it was only available exclusively via the Sega Channel cable service. The story follows a powerful being named Epsilon-Eagle, who after being nearly killed becomes determined to avenge his near death and save his planet. The character has a variety of weapons and moves that the player must master to complete the game. Many gameplay ideas are borrowed from Treasure's earlier Mega Drive release, Gunstar Heroes (1993). However, Alien Soldier puts an emphasis on challenging boss fights with short and easy levels serving as downtime in-between.

Treasure began development on four games after the release of Gunstar Heroes, among these was Alien Soldier. Development lasted two years and was led by Hideyuki Suganami, who originally held ambitious plans and wanted to build the entire game himself. With the market for the Mega Drive quickly shrinking to make headway for the incoming 32-bit fifth generation hardware, Suganami received support from other Treasure staff and released the game with only about half of his original ideas realized. The team designed and marketed Alien Soldier explicitly for "hardcore" Mega Drive gamers, designing its difficulty and scoring methods for those that enjoyed the system's strong action game library.

Alien Soldier was released towards the end of the Mega Drive's lifecycle in February 1995. Critics praised the game for its challenge and gameplay; these sentiments carried over into retrospective reviews where critics also highlighted the game's graphics, soundtrack, and overall intensity. Some negative critique was directed towards the hard difficulty, steep learning curve, and unorthodox gameplay, but many still recommend it to fans of Gunstar Heroes and the run and gun genre. The game's first re-release was on the PlayStation 2 in Japan for the Sega Ages 2500 series which includes different regional releases and extra features. It was also re-released worldwide on the Wii Virtual Console in 2007, Windows through Steam in 2011, the Nintendo Classics service, and the Sega Genesis Mini 2 in 2022.

== Gameplay ==
Epsilon-Eagle firing at one of the game's bosses

Alien Soldier is a side-scrolling run and gun video game in which the player controls the main character, Epsilon-Eagle, through 25 stages and 26 bosses. The gameplay has been compared heavily to Gunstar Heroes; however, putting a much larger emphasis on boss fights, and lacking any 2-player option. The stages are notably short, populated with weak enemies to serve as downtime between the more difficult boss battles. There are two difficulties in the game, "supereasy" and "superhard". Enemies on the hard setting are only slightly more difficult; however, there are no passwords or unlimited continues as in the easy mode.

Epsilon-Eagle can run, double jump, hover in the air, and use six different types of weapons. Only four can be equipped at any given time, but the player may choose which weapons they would like to equip before the game starts. Each gun has its own ammunition bar which can be replenished; if it is depleted the player will be left with a little firepower. The player can also perform a dash across the screen, which when at full health, will become a deadly move called "Phoenix Force" that will damage any enemies in its path. There is also a counter move, that if timed properly, will change enemy bullets into health. Epsilon-Eagle can attack in either fixed-fire or free-moving styles. The first makes him immovable while firing a weapon, instead allowing for quick aiming, while the second allows walking and shooting simultaneously with the sacrifice of directional accuracy.

== Plot ==
The premise of Alien Soldier is provided with a long text scroll at the start of the game. After the game has begun, it is not referred to again. In the year 2015, the A-Humans of A-Earth (Note: The Japanese version uses the terms "A-Humans" and "A-Earth" while the European version uses "Sierrans" and "Sierra".) have created genetically engineered A-Humans capable of super intelligence and strength, as well as parasitic co-existence with machinery and animals, particularly humans. A terrorist organization known as Scarlet rose up within this race and sought to dominate the rest of the A-Humans and A-Earth by locking the planet down and keeping anyone else out. During the height of Scarlet's power, an assassination attempt on the group's leader, Epsilon-Eagle, was carried out by a special forces group. Scarlet fought back with their powers, and the battle somehow breached the space-time continuum. Epsilon was gravely injured and cast somewhere into the continuum.

With Epsilon-Eagle seemingly gone forever, another Scarlet member known as Xi-Tiger took control of the organization. Under his rule, Scarlet became too brutal even for Scarlet, and they wished for Epsilon to reclaim his position. More or less isolated from the rest of the group, Xi sought to find and assassinate Epsilon himself. He planned an attack on an A-Human research laboratory, where children with special abilities had been kidnapped and experimented on. Upon arriving, Xi-Tiger sensed the presence of Epsilon in one of the boys. However, he was unsure because he could not pinpoint the evil from Epsilon, who had entered the boy's body and was now living as a parasite. Xi-Tiger took a young girl hostage and threatened to kill her unless Epsilon revealed himself. The boy flew into a rage and morphed his body into Epsilon himself. Xi seemed to sense this strange power, and in fear, killed the girl and fled. Epsilon had completely split his dual personality apart, with both good and evil Epsilons now chasing after Xi-Tiger.

== Development ==
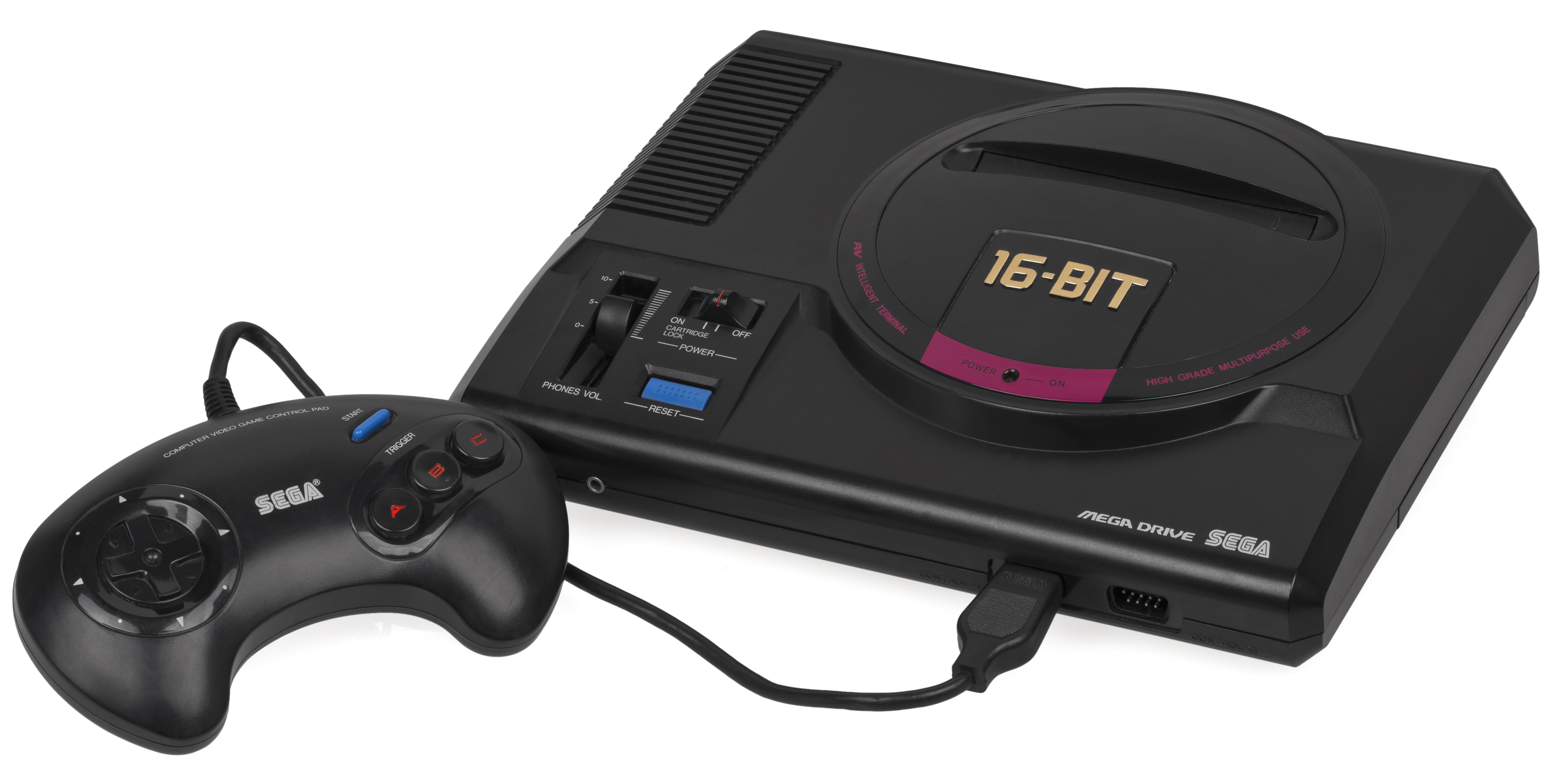
Alien Soldier was developed for and marketed towards hardcore Mega Drive players.

After developing Gunstar Heroes, Treasure was divided into four teams working on separate projects: Dynamite Headdy, Light Crusader, Yū Yū Hakusho Makyō Tōitsusen, and Alien Soldier. Development of Alien Soldier lasted two years and was led by Hideyuki Suganami, who from the start wanted to make the entire game himself. Despite 32-bit fifth generation hardware already on the market, he chose to program the game for the 16-bit Mega Drive, claiming that he may have been too captivated by the idea of making an "action shooting" game which the system was known for. Treasure explicitly targeted the game for "hardcore" Mega Drive players and designed its difficulty and end-game scoring methods with this in mind. Suganami described the game as "for Mega Drivers custom" and proudly placed the phrase on the game's title screen alongside a Mega Drive advertising slogan: "Visualshock! Speedshock! Soundshock!".

Suganami was deeply invested in Alien Soldier and devoted a lot of personal time to developing it. He began developing the game himself as the sole designer and programmer. At the time, Mega Drive games typically required two designers and two programmers, but Suganami wanted to challenge himself and see if it was possible to create the game himself. He originally had ambitious plans for a large backstory, but in order to make their deadline of January 3, 1995, the majority of it was cut from the game. As the deadline approached, he came to realize he would not be able to complete Alien Soldier himself, and so additional staff were added to provide him support. He worked overtime during the New Years holidays in order to complete the game while the market for the Mega Drive was quickly shrinking. Only about half of the team's original ideas were completed in time for release. They originally planned to create 100 bosses, but this was cut much shorter due to the time constraints. One of the bosses that was included, "Seven Force", was originally featured in Gunstar Heroes.

== Release ==
Alien Soldier was released on February 24, 1995 in Japan, followed by Europe on May 26 the same year. The game received a physical cartridge format in Australia, Europe and Japan, but in North America, the game was released exclusively through the Sega Channel cable service. Released late in the Mega Drive's lifecycle and after the release of the Sega Saturn, Alien Soldier pushed the system to its technical limits. Suganami wished he continued working on it after release, believing he could have improved on the story and graphics. Years later, Yosuke Okunari of Treasure addressed concerns that Alien Soldier was released as an incomplete game, stating that the notion is only derived from Suganami having originally had large ambitions that were never realized.

The game's first re-release was in Japan in 2006 on the PlayStation 2 as part of the Sega Ages 2500: Gunstar Heroes Treasure Box compilation together with Gunstar Heroes and Dynamite Headdy. Okunari worked on the emulation software for the release and was delighted he would be exposing the game to more people. The original cartridge has become rare and expensive due to low production numbers and positive word of mouth, selling for over 20,000 yen (~US$200) in used game stores by 2006. The PlayStation 2 release includes both PAL and Japanese versions, video filter options, and a recorded full playthrough done by an expert. Alien Soldier was released again worldwide in fall 2007 on the Wii via the Virtual Console download service, and again for Microsoft Windows on Steam on January 6, 2011. The game was also re-released on the Nintendo Switch's Nintendo Classics service on March 16, 2022.

== Reception ==
Reception

Aggregate score
Aggregator	Score
GameRankings	82%

Review scores
Publication	Score
Consoles +	88%
Computer and Video Games	80/100
Eurogamer	8/10
Famitsu	24/40
GameSpot	8/10
IGN	8/10
Mean Machines Sega	85/100
Nintendo Life	8/10
Sega Saturn Magazine (JP)	7.5 / 10

For its original Mega Drive release, Famitsu provided Alien Soldier with a score of 24 out of 40. Mean Machines Sega called it "a real gameplayer's game", citing the unrelenting waves of enemies and high difficulty. They noted how Treasure was beginning to establish a pattern of good games, and called Alien Soldier a modern classic. Simon Clays of Computer and Video Games found it to be challenging and unique by basing its gameplay on boss fights. Other editors from the magazine complimented the boss design and animations.

Frank Provo of GameSpot reviewed the Wii Virtual Console release in 2007, citing the excellent graphics, sound, and general intensity of the game. He noted initial difficulty adjusting to the controls and game design. However, once accustomed, he said, "you start totally feeling what it must be like to be an army of one trading firepower with some of the universe's largest, most elaborate creatures. That's a great feeling." Lucas M. Thomas of IGN noted the game's many similarities to Gunstar Heroes and recommended Alien Soldier to those who enjoyed it. "Alien Soldier is a long-lost piece of Treasure's action gaming legacy," said Thomas. "It's got the fast-firing, high-energy, overly-explosive intensity that fans of the company have come to expect." Darren Calvert of Nintendo Life described the graphics and animation as some of the best on the Mega Drive. He found the game difficult, but still enjoyable for fans of the run and gun genre. Dan Whitehead of Eurogamer described the game as "manically-paced" and "bizarrely creative" while also providing a disclaimer that it's "really hectic and difficult if you're not into this sort of thing."
