= Iuchi =

- Pronunciation: Iuchi

Origin
- Origin: Japanese
- Region of origin: Japanese

Iuchi (written: 井内) is a Japanese surname. Notable people with the surname include:

- Hiroshi Iuchi (井内 ひろし; born 1967), Japanese graphic designer
- Maiko Iuchi (井内 舞子), Japanese composer and arranger
- Shūji Iuchi (井内 秀治; 1950–2016), Japanese anime director
