= Pitball =

1996 video game

- Developer: Warner Interactive Europe
- Publishers: EU: Warner Interactive Europe; NA: Accolade
- Platform: PlayStation
- Release: EU: 1996; NA: November 11, 1996
- Genre: Sports

Pitball is a video game developed and published by Warner Interactive Europe for the PlayStation.

== Gameplay ==
Pitball is a game about a sport that includes elements from hockey, football, and basketball, and takes place in an intergalactic theater.

== Reception ==
Reception

Review scores
Publication	Score
GamePro	3.5/5
GameRevolution	B+
GameSpot	7.5/10
Hyper	84%
IGN	5/10
Mega Fun	73%
PlayStation Official Magazine – Australia	7/10
PlayStation Official Magazine – UK	7/10
Play	66%
Video Games (DE)	45%
Playstation Pro	8/10

IGN spotlighted the graphics and music, highlighting the intro, traps, weapons, and special moves, but claimed the experience was brought down by very long load times, confusing button configurations, and the amount of time it takes for a playable character to stand up once knocked down.

Critics frequently noted the multi-player mode to be more fun than single-player.
