= Shinrei Jusatsushi Tarōmaru =

1997 video game

- Developer: Time Warner Interactive Japan
- Publisher: Time Warner Interactive Japan
- Designer: Michio Okano
- Programmers: Osamu Yamamoto; Kazuya Furukawa
- Artists: Hiroshi Iuchi; Kenichi Nemoto
- Composers: Kenji Yokoyama; Shunichi Hanawa
- Platform: Sega Saturn
- Release: JP: January 17, 1997
- Genre: Action
- Modes: Single-player, multiplayer

Shinrei Jusatsushi Tarōmaru (Japanese: 心霊呪殺師 太郎丸) (Note: The title has been translated by western journalists as Psychic Killer Taromaru, Psychic Assassin Taromaru, and other close variations.) is a side-scrolling action game developed and published by the Japanese division of Time Warner Interactive for the Sega Saturn. Players take on the role of psychic ninjas battling an assortment of demons in Feudal Japan to rescue a kidnapped girl. The game was released in Japan in 1997 amid Time Warner Interactive's closure, resulting in a low print run. It is considered by gaming journalists as one of the rarest, most valuable, and most sought-after Saturn games. Critics have generally praised the game for its layered 2D and 3D visual effects, inventive level design, and impressive boss battles. Some compared it positively to the Shinobi and Castlevania series.

== Gameplay ==
The game features 2D sprites over 3D backgrounds.

Shinrei Jusatsushi Tarōmaru is a 2.5D side-scrolling action game that takes place in Feudal Japan. The player can choose to play as one of two ninja, Tarōmaru or Enkai, who are hired as bounty hunters to defeat powerful demons and save a stolen maiden. The characters fight their enemies with psychic powers and play nearly identically outside of minor differences in their attack ranges. Enemies are targeted automatically with a reticle that hovers across the screen. The player can fire bursts of energy or charge up their energy for a more destructive attack which can hit multiple enemies. The characters can normally jump, slide, and dash across the stages, but they cannot move when firing. In addition to the main attack, the player can also hypnotize certain types of enemies into fighting alongside them, as well as throw up a protective sphere which quickly pushes back enemies and absorbs projectiles. The bosses make up a significant portion of the gameplay and include an assortment of supernatural beasts and demons including large spiders and frogs. There is a two player cooperative mode.

== Development and release ==
Shinrei Jusatsushi Tarōmaru was developed by Time Warner Interactive's Japanese studios for the Sega Saturn. A PlayStation version was planned but was never released. Hiroshi Iuchi, known for his work with Treasure, did some of the art design. Characters were designed by Kenichi Nemoto. The game was demonstrated at the Tokyo Toy Show in June 1996. The game was released on January 17, 1997, exclusively in Japan. Time Warner Interactive reportedly only produced 7,500 copies because they closed the business shortly after the game's release, This figure is disputed; Edge reported it as 5,000 copies, and GameFan and Sega Saturn Magazine reported 50,000 copies. Previously during development, in March 1996, the company was purchased by WMS Industries.

Its low print run resulted in it becoming one of the rarest Sega Saturn games and most desired by collectors, raising its value to hundreds of dollars. 1UP.com called it the single rarest Saturn game, Nintendo Life called it the most sought-after game for the system, and Eurogamer wrote that it has long been the most prized possession for Saturn collectors. According to USgamer, it is games like Shinrei Jusatsushi Tarōmaru that drive the Saturn's appeal to serious game enthusiasts. Retro Gamer regretted how its scarcity will mean many players will ultimately never have the opportunity to play it.

== Reception and legacy ==
Reception

Review scores
Publication	Score
Famitsu	5/10, 4/10, 6/10, 7/10
Consoles +	87%
Sega Saturn Magazine (JP)	7.33/10
Super Game Power	4/5

After its preview at the Tokyo Toy Show, Electronic Gaming Monthly reported that it was one of the sleeper hits there, and they were disappointed to hear there were no localization plans. They compared it to the Castlevania series, and wrote: "It plays unbelievably well...We will be watching this title very closely in the next few months." Next Generation and Edge, writing in a shared editorial, compared it positively to the Shinobi series and praised the dark but impressive 3D environments. Post release, GameFan compared the game favorably to Mystic Defender (1989). They found the gameplay to be surprisingly deep and intense, and praised the level design and boss battles. The 3D backgrounds and special effects were also highlighted. Sega Saturn Magazine in Japan gave it a 7.33 out of 10, saying that it looked better than it played. They thought the auto lock-on function and scarcity of recovery items made it slightly difficult, but found that persistence in mastering the gameplay led to seeing how diligently the game was designed.

In retrospective coverage, Shinrei Jusatsushi Tarōmaru has continued to achieve critical praise. Tom Massey (Eurogamer) called it one of the best games of the 32-bit era. He also compared it to works by Treasure and praised its inventive, strategic gameplay and "dwarfing" boss battles. Retro Gamer included it on their list of essential Sega Saturn imports, commending the "insanely over-the-top" action and creative level design. They noted that the game borrows elements from the Shinobi series and Alisia Dragoon (1992). James Watkins from 1UP.com compared the game to Shinobi and Castlevania, and highlighted the boss fights, and tight, intuitive controls. Multiple critics also praised different aspects of the visuals. Watkins commended the blend of 2D sprites layered atop 3D backgrounds, Retro Gamer did the same for the animation, and Kurt Kalata of Hardcore Gaming 101 believed that the special effects were high quality, although he thought the textures and sprites were blotchy. Kalata concluded: "...it's an excellent ode to 16-bit side scrollers, and a great portal into an alternate future where gaming didn't completely sell out to 3D."
