= T-MEK =

1994 video game

- Arcade flyer
- Developer: Atari Games (Note: Ported to 32X and MS-DOS by Bits Corporation)
- Publisher: Atari Games; Time Warner Interactive: 32X Sega MS-DOS Midway WizardWorks (NA)
- Producer: Gary Stark
- Designer: Matthew Ford
- Programmer: John Grigsby
- Artist: Rhizaldi Bugawan
- Composer: Brad Fuller
- Platforms: Arcade, 32X, MS-DOS
- Release: Arcade: NA: July 1994; 32X: NA: 1995; EU: October 1995; MS-DOS: NA: 1995; EU: 1996
- Genres: First-person shooter, mech simulator
- Modes: Single-player, multiplayer
- Arcade system: Atari GT

T-MEK is a 1994 first-person shooter video game developed by Atari Games and released by Time Warner Interactive for arcades.

== Gameplay ==
Arcade version screenshot

Each player can choose their MEK (a hovering tank with special weapons and abilities). One player can play against 6 AI players and the occasional boss, or two players can play against each other and 4 AI players. There is a special tournament mode where two players can go one on one. Up to three T-MEK cabinets can be linked for six-player competitions. T-MEK featured surround sound, which Time Warner Interactive advertised as "CAGE Audio". Each player's station had four speakers; two in front and two behind the player, and a subwoofer mounted directly below the seat. T-MEK had no background music soundtrack, which was a departure for "deluxe" arcade games in the coming-of-age era of digitally sampled audio, and instead relied upon the sound to help aid the player in finding enemies.

== Release ==
In 1995, Time Warner Interactive released an updated version called T-MEK: The Warlords. In addition to the ability to play as a boss MEK by entering his name, the update added a "beginner" difficulty mode, instructional screens on how to play the game, new combo moves, and more. T-MEK was later ported to MS-DOS and the 32X; rather than linking multiple systems together, the home versions featured split-screen multiplayer for two players. A conversion for the Atari Jaguar was being developed and planned to be published by Time Warner Interactive, but development on the port was terminated sometime in 1995, with no reason given to the cancellation of this version.

== Reception ==
Reception

Review scores
Publication	Score
Computer and Video Games	(ARC) 70/100
Electronic Gaming Monthly	(32X) 6.125/10
GamePro	(ARC) 20/20 (32X) 11.5/20
IGN	(32X) 4.0/10
Next Generation	(ARC) 3/5
The Atari Times	(ARC) 83% (32X) 60%
Game-Over!	(DOS) 4/10
PC Gameworld	(DOS) 36%
Power Play	(DOS) 9%
Ultimate Gamer	(32X) 5/10
VideoGames	(32X) 6/10

T-MEK garnered positive reception from critics upon its original arcade release. RePlay reported the game to be the second most-popular deluxe arcade game at the time. Play Meter also listed the title to be the second most-popular arcade game at the time. Electronic Gaming Monthly praised the arcade original's visuals and compared it favorably to Namco's Cyber Sled. GamePro's The Obliterator gave the arcade version a perfect score, citing easy to learn controls, the excitement added by the surround sound and "rumble seat", and the detailed visuals. He commented that "While T-MEK's graphics are not groundbreaking, they sizzle with depth and realism." Next Generation reviewed the arcade version of the game and stated that "With new graphics and special effects, T-Mek is an old game given new life." The Atari Times' Darryl Brundage commended the visuals, sound design, and controls but noted its high difficulty during single-player.

The 32X version was met with a mixed response from reviewers. The four reviewers of Electronic Gaming Monthly commented that the arcade game was great fun but that its excitement and intensity were lost in the translation to 32X. Most of them were also critical of the port's technical aspects, with one going so far as to say that an equally good or even better port could have been done on the Genesis. A reviewer of VideoGames regarded the 32X port to be a solid but average conversion, praising the presentation and visuals. GamePro's Air Hendrix had a similar assessment. Hendrix said the slowdown and cramped split-screen in the two-player mode ruin the multiplayer experience, which he felt was the main draw of the arcade version, and that "With awful pixelation and weak detail, the graphics don't even pretend to be 32-bit." The Atari Times' Darryl Brundage commended the 32X port for being faithful to the arcade original in terms of visuals and praised the addition of new arenas but criticized its controls for being too sensitive. IGN's Levi Buchanan was overly critical of the 32X port, stating that "the charms of the arcade game, an over-the-top Battlezone update with network play, are nowhere to be found."

The MS-DOS version received negative reviews. Games Domain's Chris McMullen criticized the DOS port for its poor visuals, dodgy audio design, lack of replay value, and unoriginality, stating that "I tried to find something good about this game, but there is nothing at all to recommend T-MEK." The Marauder of online magazine Game-Over! heavily criticized the DOS port for being a straightforward conversion without new additions, its complicated installation setup, and lack of network multiplayer. A reviewer of PC Gameworld commended the DOS for its two-player mode and framerate but criticized the visuals for being poor and the limited gameplay, stating that "he promise of a decent 'mech fighter is lost in the reality of this lackluster shooter."
