= Tama: Adventurous Ball in Giddy Labyrinth =

1994 video game

- Original Saturn cover art
- Developer: Time Warner Interactive
- Publisher: Time Warner Interactive
- Designers: Jun Amanai; Mizuho Yoshioka
- Programmer: Osamu Yamamoto
- Artists: Kenichi Nemoto; Michio Okano; Satomi Yokose
- Composer: Kenji Yokoyama
- Platforms: PlayStation; Sega Saturn
- Release: Saturn: JP: 22 November 1994; PlayStation: JP: 3 December 1994
- Genres: Platform, racing
- Mode: Single-player

Tama: Adventurous Ball in Giddy Labyrinth (Note: Also known as TAMA (Japanese: たま, Hepburn: Tama) in Japan) is a video game developed and published under Tengen's new name: Time Warner Interactive for the Sega Saturn and Sony PlayStation in 1994. Tama was also a launch title for both consoles.

== Gameplay ==
Tama is a game in which the player rolls a ball through a maze by moving the terrain.

== Development and release ==
Tama was produced by former employees of Japanese company Tengen, which became part of the newly-formed Time Warner Interactive in mid-1994. The project was directed by Jun Amanai, who had previously designed PC releases for SoftBank and the arcade game World Stadium for Namco. At Tengen he worked as a lead on the Game Gear title Popils, the TurboGrafx-16 port of Klax, and the Japanese Mega Drive port of Marble Madness. He wrote the instructions manuals for a number of these titles as well. Co-planner Mizuho Yoshioka revealed that the game's original director left partway into development. After the shock of this wore off, he pulled himself together and rallied the remaining staff to complete their work. Tama was a Japanese launch game for both the Sega Saturn on November 22, 1994 and the PlayStation on December 3, 1994.

== Reception ==
Reception

Review scores
Publication	Score
Computer and Video Games	72% (SAT)
Famitsu	21/40 (SAT); 20/40 (PS)
Mean Machines Sega	69% (SAT)
Next Generation	2/5 (SAT); 3/5 (PS)
Consoles +	81% (SAT)
Dengeki PlayStation	(PS) 50/100, 45/100, 50/100, 45/100
Joypad	70% or 80% (PS)
MAN!AC	62% (SAT); 64% (PS)
PlayStation Magazine	16/30 (PS)
Sega Power	64% (SAT)
Saturn Fan	19.29/30 (SAT)
Ultimate Future Games	68% (SAT)

Tama received consistently average reviews from both Japanese magazines and foreign publications that imported the game. Next Generation reviewed both versions of the game separately. It rated the Saturn edition two stars out of five and stated, "Unlikely to star big in Saturn's US line-up. And this is probably a Good Thing." It rated the PlayStation edition a higher three stars out of five, summarizing, "On one hand it's encouraging to see the Saturn handling the demands of this game as nicely as it does, but in the end its power would be better applied elsewhere."
