= Party Quiz Mega Q =

1993 video game

- Developer: Sega
- Publisher: Sega
- Composer: Hirofumi Murasaki
- Platform: Mega Drive
- Release: JP: 5 November 1993
- Genre: Quiz game
- Modes: Single-player, multiplayer

Party Quiz Mega Q (Note: Party Quiz Mega Q (パーティークイズMEGA Q, Pātī Kuizu Mega Kyu)) is a quiz video game developed and published by Sega, which released for the Mega Drive in Japan in 1993. Players participate in a television quiz programme, answering questions in rounds of differing rules, earning or losing points along the way. Up to five players are supported, and the game was released on the Wii's Virtual Console in 2007. In 2014, the soundtrack was released on the Mega Drive 25th Anniversary Album Vol.1 album.

== Gameplay ==
A typical game in progress

The game plays like a real Japanese television quiz programme that airs on Channel 13 and is hosted by Tiger Yakuto: five contestants compete against each other in rounds of various quiz modes, and up to five players can play simultaneously using the Mega Drive's Multiplayer Adaptor. In each mode, points are awarded for answering questions correctly, and deducted for answering incorrectly. Quiz modes include (although are not limited to) the Bet Quiz, where the contestants place bets before a question, and the Genre Selection Quiz, where a genre is chosen and a question of that genre is posed (each time a genre is selected, the point stake is increased). The programme features advert breaks during which Sega products are advertised. The winner plays the Time Attack Quiz, where questions are answered within a time limit to "win" prizes. There is also a free play mode where players can practise quiz types without playing in the programme.

== Legacy ==
Party Quiz Mega Q was released on the Virtual Console in Japan on 18 December 2007. The soundtrack, composed by Hirofumi Murasaki, was released on the Mega Drive 25th Anniversary Album Vol.1 album in Japan in July 2014. It was included in the Japanese version of the Mega Drive Mini microconsole in September 2019, and two updated versions of the game with new questions, titled Party Quiz Mega Q 2022 and Party Quiz Sega Q (with Takenobu Mitsuyoshi replacing Tiger Yakuto as the host), were included in the Japanese edition of the follow-up system, the Mega Drive Mini 2, released on October 27, 2022. All three versions support Buffalo's USB Hub.
