= Hiroshi Iuchi =

Japanese graphic designer (born 1967)

- Born: January 13, 1967 (age 59)
- Occupations: Video game director, designer, composer

Hiroshi Iuchi (井内 ひろし) is a Japanese director, graphic designer, and composer who is widely known for his work at the game development studio Treasure.

He started his career by joining Konami in 1989 where he worked on a number of arcade titles. In 1992, Iuchi and a number of Konami employees including Masato Maegawa and Norio Hanzawa splintered away from the company to form Treasure. His first game for the new company was the critically acclaimed Gunstar Heroes.

In 1995, Iuchi left Treasure to join Time Warner Interactive. He was re-hired by Treasure in 1997 where he worked on his first project as a director, Radiant Silvergun.

Despite a new string of successes including Ikaruga and Gradius V, Iuchi once again left Treasure in 2006. He resurfaced in 2007 as a freelance graphic designer and has since worked with Treasure on the Xbox Live Arcade port of Ikaruga and Bleach: Versus Crusade for the Wii. In 2012 he directed Kokuga for G.Rev. As of 2013 he works at M2.

== Works ==
- Quarth (1989) - Graphics
- Aliens (1990) - 2nd Player and Demonstration Graphics
- Escape Kids (1991) - Character Graphics
- The Simpsons (1991) - 1st Boss and Character Display Graphics
- Bucky O'Hare (1992) - Character, Effects, and Demonstration Graphics
- Gunstar Heroes (1993) - All Background Graphics and Title Logo
- Alien Soldier (1995) - Stages 1–9 Background Graphics
- Light Crusader (1995) - Background, Effects, and 70% Character Graphics, 2 Pieces of Music
- Shinrei Jusatsushi Taroumaru (1997) - 70% Background Graphics, 50% Boss Graphics, Other
- Radiant Silvergun (1998) - Director, Planner, All Background Graphics, Effects
- Sin and Punishment: Hoshi no Keishōsha (2000) - 90% Background Graphics, Effects, Other
- Ikaruga (2001) - Director, Planner, Prototype Production, 70% Background Graphics, Effects, All Music
- Gradius V (2004) - Director, Planner, 60% Background Graphics, Effects
- Ikaruga XBLA (2008) - Graphic Data Conversion, Additional Graphics
- Bleach: Versus Crusade (2008) - 90% Background Graphics, Lighting
- Strania (2011) - 10% Background Graphics
- Kokuga (2012) - Director, Planner, 80% Background Graphics, Effects
- 3D After Burner II (2013) - Planner, Graphic Designer
- 3D Thunder Blade (2013) - Graphic Designer
- The Legend of Dark Witch 3: Wisdom and Lunacy (2017) - Director
- Night Striker Gear (2025) - Director, Planner, Map & Level Designer, Graphic Designer & Modeler
- Ubusuna (canceled) - Director, Music
