= Time Warner Interactive =

Video game developing and publishing division within Time Warner

- Formerly: Time Warner Interactive Group (1993–1994)
- Type: Division
- Industry: Video games
- Predecessor: Tengen
- Founded: June 23, 1993; 33 years ago (as Time Warner Consumer Products)
- Defunct: April 12, 1996; 30 years ago (North America); November 1996; 29 years ago (Europe); January 17, 1997; 29 years ago (Japan)
- Fate: Sold to WMS Industries, later transferred to Midway Games
- Headquarters: 2210 West Olive Avenue, Burbank, California 91506, U.S.
- Products: Primal Rage; Rise of the Robots; T-MEK
- Parent: Time Warner
- Subsidiaries: Atari Games

Time Warner Interactive (TWI) was an American video game developing and publishing division within Time Warner. It was formed in 1993 after Time Warner acquired a controlling interest in Atari Games, which was already partly held by Time Warner. It was active until 1996 when WMS Industries, the owners of the Williams, Bally and Midway arcade brands, bought the company.

Time Warner Interactive was responsible for games such as Rise of the Robots, Primal Rage, and T-MEK.

== History ==
Time Warner Interactive was formed in 1984 as Warner New Media, a multimedia music division that focused on the release of CD-ROMs during the final years under the name. In June 1993, the company was renamed as the Time Warner Interactive Group with a focus on both CD-ROM material and interactive content for Time Warner's Full Service Network (FSN), which was a planned two-way cable system due for release the following year.

In March 1994, the Time Warner Interactive Group expanded to the video game market when Time Warner acquired a controlling interest in Atari Games, an arcade game developer and publisher which Time Warner's predecessor Warner Communications already held a 25% interest in. The purchase of the stake increased Time Warner's ownership in the company to 27%. In April, The Time Warner Interactive Group, Atari Games and Tengen were consolidated as Time Warner Interactive. In June, Tengen Inc. was renamed to Time Warner Interactive (California) Inc., with the Tengen brand ceasing to exist on video games. The Japanese division of Tengen, was rebranded as Time Warner Interactive Japan.

In 1995, Time Warner acquired an additional development studio, the UK-based Renegade Software, and formed a standalone video game division, Warner Interactive Entertainment.

In 1995, Inscape absorbed two Warner Music Group's interactive divisions: Time Warner Interactive and WarnerActive.

On March 29, 1996, WMS Industries announced they had purchased Time Warner Interactive/Atari Games from Time Warner. The publishing division was folded into Williams Entertainment (later renamed Midway Home Entertainment), while Atari Games became part of Midway, and eventually was renamed Midway Games West in 1999. Several titles begin development by TWI, including Wayne Gretzky's 3D Hockey, which was eventually released by Williams Entertainment after the acquisition. The European division of the company was merged with Warner Interactive Entertainment. In November, GT Interactive purchased Warner Interactive Entertainment for $6.3 million.

The only remaining division of the company, Time Warner Interactive Japan, ceased operations and was liquidated in July 1997 after releasing its last game, Shinrei Jusatsushi Tarōmaru, in limited quantities for the Sega Saturn in January.

Time Warner would eventually regain ownership of the library of the former Time Warner Interactive when they acquired the assets of Midway in 2009.

== List of games ==
Release Date	Title	Platform	Developer	Publisher
1994	Rise of the Robots	Amiga, CD32, MS-DOS		X mark
1994	The Lawnmower Man	Genesis, Sega CD		X mark
1994	Red Zone	Genesis		X mark
1994	Generations Lost	Genesis		X mark
1994	Sylvester and Tweety in Cagey Capers	Genesis		X mark
1994	Dick Vitale's "Awesome, Baby!" College Hoops	Genesis	X mark	X mark
1994	Mega SWIV	Sega Genesis		X mark
1994	R.B.I. Baseball '94	Game Gear		X mark
1994	Tama: Adventurous Ball in Giddy Labyrinth	Saturn, PlayStation	X mark	X mark
1994	Kawasaki Superbike Challenge	Genesis, Super NES		X mark
1995	Super R.B.I. Baseball	Super NES		X mark
1995	Cheese Cat-astrophe starring Speedy Gonzalez	Game Gear, Master System		X mark
1995	R.B.I. Baseball '95	32X	X mark	X mark
1995	Wayne Gretzky and the NHLPA All-Stars	Genesis, Super NES	X mark	X mark
1995	T-MEK	32X		X mark
1995	Race Drivin'	Saturn	X mark	X mark
1995	Primal Rage	32X, Amiga, Jaguar CD, MS-DOS, Game Boy, Game Gear, PlayStation, Genesis, Saturn, Super NES		X mark
1995	Power Drive Rally	Jaguar		X mark
1995	Virtua Racing	Saturn		X mark
1995	Endorfun	Windows		X mark
1996	Striker '96	PlayStation		X mark
1996	Pitball	PlayStation	X mark	X mark
1997	Shinrei Jusatsushi Tarōmaru	Saturn	X mark	X mark
