= Alisia Dragoon =

1992 video game

- European cover art
- Developer: Game Arts
- Publisher: Sega: JP: Game Arts
- Programmers: Naozumi Honma; Osamu Harada
- Artist: Masatoshi Azumi
- Writer: Yoshimi Kanda
- Composers: Fumihito Kasatani; Nobuyuki Aoshima; Mamoru Ishimoda; Yoko Sonoda; Mariko Sato
- Platform: Sega Genesis
- Release: NA: March 1992; JP: April 24, 1992; EU: June 24, 1992
- Genre: Platform
- Mode: Single-player

Alisia Dragoon (Note: Japanese: アリシアドラグーン, Hepburn: Arishia Doragūn) is a 1992 platform game developed by Game Arts and published by Sega for the Sega Genesis. The player controls Alisia, a young woman who is on a quest to avenge her father and save the world. She can fire lightning from her hands and summon four faithful beasts to aid her. The game was later made available on the Sega Genesis Mini and Nintendo Classics service.

== Gameplay ==
Gameplay involves action and platforming elements, as the player controls Alisia to jump onto platforms and kill enemies with the aid of her pets.

In Alisia Dragoon, the player controls the protagonist, Alisia, in her quest to save the world by defeating the evil forces that killed her father. The game consists of eight levels of side-scrolling environments; Alisia has to jump across gaps and kill the enemies that stand in her way. Each stage is completed by defeating the boss at the end.

Alisia attacks by shooting streaks of lightning from her hands. The attack automatically targets enemies in range but gets weaker with each volley as Alisia's power is depleted. Her power recharges when she stops attacking; when fully charged, it allows her to unleash a multi-target attack, hitting every enemy on the screen. The energy system introduces an element of strategy, encouraging the player to manage Alisia's power to have her able to defend herself at critical moments.

Helping Alisia in her quest are her pet monsters. These creatures fly around the heroine on their own, attacking her foes, and blocking enemy attacks from hitting her. There are four pets, each with its own type of attack. The Dragon Frye spits fireballs, and the Boomerang Lizard hurls boomerangs. The Thunder Raven emits a thunder blast that affects enemies across the screen, and the Ball O' Fire burns enemies on contact. Only one pet can fight alongside Alisia in her quest, but the player can select any of the four (or none) as the active companion at any time.

Over the course of the game, Alisia and her monsters can improve their abilities by collecting power-ups. These enhancement items are placed throughout the first seven stages, mostly in hidden locations. The various power-ups can heal Alisia and her monsters, increase their maximum life bars, improve their attacks, or grant invulnerability for a certain time. Life bars are lost by taking damage from enemy attacks and traps. When Alisia's pets lose all their life bars, they are removed from play and cannot be brought back until a "Revive" power-up is collected. If Alisia loses all her life bars, she can restart the level by expending a continue. The game ends if all the continues have been used. Alisia Dragoon has no features for saving the player's progress. After the game is completed, a screen is shown, charting the overall performance of the player based on the number of kills, the power level of Alisia's attack, and the frequency the pet monsters are used.

== Plot ==
Similar to most action games on the Sega Genesis, the plot in Alisia Dragoon is simple and short. The game goes straight into the action, tasking Alisia to demolish everything in sight. After defeating the final boss, the player is treated to a cinematic cutscene of Alisia's triumphant return to her home.

Much of the backstory is described in the manual. Alisia is the daughter of a sorcerer who attempted to stop the prince of all things evil, Baldour. As a child, her father was tortured to death in front of her eyes by Baldour. Although the world has not fully recovered from the devastating effects of Baldour's last visit, Baldour's aide Ornah manages to transport his dormant cocoon back to Earth. Now a woman with magical ability rivaling that of her father, Alisia sets out to destroy Baldour's cocoon before he can awaken.

== Development ==
In 1992, Japanese animation studio Gainax was in a collaboration with Game Arts, the makers of the Lunar role-playing games, to produce an action video game. Gainax's video game product line tended to target a niche crowd who generally preferred dating simulations and anime-based adventure games. Alisia Dragoon is a departure from this tradition. The animation studio handled the artistic end of the production, writing the story and creating the artwork that would be used for the design of the game's environments and characters. Several of its founders had worked on Hayao Miyazaki's animated films, and the influences of Miyazaki's 1984 science fiction animated film Nausicaä of the Valley of the Wind were evident in certain levels of the game. Similarly, due to the predominance of mixing science fiction with fantasy themes in the Japanese animation circles at that time, Alisia Dragoon featured high-tech spaceships and robots alongside mythical zombies and dragons. The composition of the soundtrack was delegated to Mecano Associates, who had produced the music for other works from Game Arts, such as the action games Fire Hawk: Thexder 2 and Silpheed. Game Arts, however, did most of the work in producing Alisia Dragoon, adapting the artwork into environments and creatures that can be rendered by the console hardware and writing them as lines of software code.

== Reception ==
Reception

Review scores
Publication	Score
Mean Machines	87%
Mega	81%
Sega Pro	85/100

Alisia Dragoon sold few copies upon its release in Japan. The game was published earlier by Sega for North America. However, it was a subdued release; Sega did not place major advertisements for the game in the media. To localize the contents for the Western market, the video game publisher made several cosmetic changes to Alisia Dragoon. Instead of a big-eyed heroine drawn in typical anime styling, Alisia was portrayed as a golden bikini-wearing barbarianess on the box covers outside Japan. The Western depiction of Alisia was likened to the scantily clad females in artist Boris Vallejo's work.

Westerners were more enthusiastic toward the game than were the Japanese, although there were a few negative appraisals. GamePro magazine opined Alisia Dragoon's responsive controls, coupled with the hectic action and handsome graphics, made the game highly desirable for owners of the Genesis console. The Lessers of Dragon magazine were equally impressed with the gameplay, praising Alisia Dragoon for its "solid arcade action" that satisfied their "need for fast reflexes". Mean Machines's Julian Rignall praised the game for its pet monsters design, calling the management of the pets in the game an encouragement toward tactics. His fellow reviewer, Richard Leadbetter, wrote the game was visually attractive with "beautiful sprites" and "amazing backdrops". He found the gameplay challenging, being forced to conserve energy as the game "[threw] everything but the kitchen sink at [him]". Rignall agreed with Leadbetter on the game's difficulty, which along with the secret rooms and power-ups to be discovered made Alisia Dragoon an excellent action platform game that had long-lasting appeal. Of the hundreds of Genesis games, Mega magazine rated Alisia Dragoon among the top 100 games, calling it "[probably] the best dragon-based platform game around." Despite the positive sentiments, sales of the game outside Japan were weak.

Sixteen years after the game's release, Todd Ciolek of Anime News Network reviewed Alisia Dragoon and repeated much of the same sentiments as the Mean Machines reviewers. Noting Gainax's catalog of games, he noted that Alisia Dragoon was very different from the rest; instead of targeting hardcore fans of anime and focusing on exploitive themes, the game's appeal was for everyone. In light of this, Ciolek called Alisia Dragoon "the best video game Gainax ever touched" and "a spectacular ride in its own right".
