= Ikaruga =

2001 video game

- Original arcade flyer
- Developer: Treasure
- Publishers: Treasure: WW: Treasure (Arcade/X360/Steam); JP: Entertainment Software Publishing (Dreamcast); WW: Infogrames (Note: Released under the Atari brand name) (GameCube); WW: Nicalis (Switch)
- Director: Hiroshi Iuchi
- Producer: Masato Maegawa
- Designer: Yasushi Suzuki
- Programmer: Atsutomo Nakagawa
- Composer: Hiroshi Iuchi
- Platforms: Arcade, Dreamcast, GameCube, Xbox 360, Windows, Nintendo Switch, PlayStation 4
- Release: 20 December 2001: Arcade; JP: 20 December 2001; JP: 8 August 2013 (NESiCAxLive) Dreamcast; JP: 5 September 2002 GameCube; JP: 16 January 2003; NA: 15 April 2003; PAL: 9 May 2003 Xbox 360; WW: 9 April 2008 Windows; WW: 18 February 2014 Nintendo Switch; WW: 29 May 2018 PlayStation 4; WW: 29 June 2018
- Genre: Shoot 'em up
- Modes: Single-player, multiplayer
- Arcade system: Sega NAOMI

Ikaruga (Japanese: 斑鳩; lit. 'Japanese grosbeak') is a bullet hell game developed by Treasure. It is the spiritual sequel to Radiant Silvergun (1998) and was originally released in Japanese arcades in December 2001. The story follows a rebel pilot named Shinra as he battles an enemy nation using a specially designed fighter called the Ikaruga which can flip between two polarities, black and white. This polarity mechanism is the game's key feature and the foundation for its stage and enemy design. All enemies and bullets in the game are either black or white. Bullets which are the same color as the player are absorbed while the others will kill the player. The game features both single-player and cooperative modes.

Development on Ikaruga began during director Hiroshi Iuchi's off-hours while Treasure was busy developing Sin and Punishment (2000). Titled "Project RS2", the game began as a sequel to Radiant Silvergun, and borrows many elements from it as well as the polarity mechanism from Treasure's Silhouette Mirage (1997). During the game's prototype stages, the player's ammo was limited. The bullet absorption mechanism was used as a means to refill ammo. However, this was found to be weak as it created too many breaks in the action so it was later added as an additional mode in home ports. In tradition with Treasure's game design philosophy, Ikaruga was intentionally crafted to challenge the conventions of standard game design and develop a new type of shooting game. All together, five Treasure staff worked on Ikaruga, as well as three support staff from G.rev.

Upon its initial release in Japanese arcades, reception was mixed. Treasure staff explained this was due to players expecting a more standard shooter offering but instead being greeted with a different game system that featured more puzzle-like elements rather than the twitch gameplay of bullet-dodging. In 2002, Ikaruga was ported to the Dreamcast in Japan and began to grow a cult following from import gamers worldwide. It was later released in the West in 2003 on the GameCube, receiving positive reviews. Critics praised the graphics as well as the art and sound design. Some criticism was directed towards its difficulty. Most critics felt the unique game design choices were innovative, while some believed they stifled many of the classic shooter elements. Ikaruga was later ported to the Xbox 360, Windows, Nintendo Switch, and PlayStation 4. In retrospect, Ikaruga is regarded by critics as one of the best games ever made, especially in the shoot 'em up genre, and one of Treasure's greatest works.

== Gameplay ==
Ikaruga is a vertically scrolling shoot 'em up. The game features five stages, three levels of difficulty, and supports single-player or two-player cooperative modes. The player pilots the Ikaruga fighter, moving to avoid obstacles and other danger. A key gameplay feature to Ikaruga is its polarity system. The player can press a button at any time to switch the polarity of their ship between black and white. When white, the ship will absorb white bullets fired by enemies and store their power until released with a special attack. However, if the ship is white and hit by black bullets, it will be destroyed. The opposite is true when the ship is black. Enemy fighters also have black and white polarities. If the player ship is white and the enemy is black, the player's bullets will do twice the damage than if their ship was black. If an enemy is destroyed with the same polarity as the player, the ship will expel energy which can be absorbed or, if the player changes polarities too quickly, present a fatal danger.

A player uses the homing laser attack while in black form. White bullets are approaching from the left.

Ikaruga does not feature any pick-ups or power-ups, instead, the player can only rely on their standard firing weapon and a homing laser. Absorbed bullets contribute to building the player's homing laser attack. The power of the attack increases one level for every 10 enemy bullets absorbed. Each level is equal to one laser, with a maximum of 12 which can be stored. A homing laser is 10 times more powerful than a standard shot. The game's scoring system is based upon chaining attacks to earn bonuses. Destroying three enemy fighters of the same color in a row will earn the player a chain bonus. The player will earn 100 points for their first chain bonus, and double the amount for each bonus thereafter. These bonuses can be multiplied up to a maximum of 25,600, but if interrupted by destroying an enemy out of order, the bonus will be reset.

Home console ports of Ikaruga feature additional gameplay modes apart from the standard arcade mode. Modes are available that allow players to practice single stages they have unlocked at normal or slow speeds. A challenge mode is available which logs players' scores and compares them to others worldwide. (Note: In the GameCube port, this ranking feature required the player to enter a code online.) If certain conditions are met, a prototype mode is unlocked which limits the number of bullets the player has. Bullets must be absorbed to keep ammo in stock. In an alternative way to play the standard game called "Bullet Eater", the player does not fire any shots and instead navigates through all the stages by absorbing bullets.

== Synopsis ==
Many years ago on the island nation of Horai, leader of the nation, Tenro Horai, discovered the Ubusunagami Okinokai (lit. The Power of the Gods). This energy emanated from an object she dug up from deep underground, which granted her unimaginable powers. Soon after, Tenro and her followers, who call themselves "The Divine Ones", began conquering nations one after another. "The Divine Ones" carried out these conquests in "The name of peace".

A freedom federation known as The Tenkaku emerged to challenge Horai. Using fighter planes called Hitekkai, they fought with the hope of freeing the world from the Horai's grips, but their efforts were in vain, as they were no match for The Horai and were almost completely wiped out. Miraculously, however, one young man called Shinra (森羅) survived the battle.

Shot down near a remote village, inhabited by elderly people who were exiled by the Horai's conquests, Shinra was rescued from the wreckage and was nursed back to health. Shinra pledged to defeat the Horai, and the villagers entrusted him with a fighter plane designed by former engineering genius Amanai with the help of the village leader Kazamori, called The Ikaruga. Hidden in a secret underground bunker and launched via the transportation device called "The Sword of Acala", Ikaruga is the first fighter to be built with both energy polarities, and is capable of successfully switching between the two.

Shinra battles against the Horai across the game's five stages, and ultimately faces Tenro Horai herself. He destroys her ship, killing her and releasing the octahedron-shaped object stored inside, which appears to be the source of the Power of the Gods and partly resembles the Stone-Like object featured in Treasure's previous game Radiant Silvergun. Shinra releases the Ikaruga's restraint device and unleashes a massive attack to destroy the object for good, sacrificing himself in the process as the ship overheats and explodes.

In the two-player game, Shinra is accompanied by Kagari (篝), a mercenary of the Horai defeated by Shinra. After Shinra spared her life, she decided to fight against Horai alongside the resistance. Her ship, The Ginkei, was modified by the people of Ikaruga village to give it the ability to switch between the two polarities, like the Ikaruga. Kagari's fate at the end of the game is the same as Shinra's, dying as her ship is destroyed in the final attack against the object.

== Development ==
Development of Ikaruga began while Treasure's Sin and Punishment (2000) was still in development. Ikaruga was self-funded (and later self-published). Since company resources were allocated for Sin and Punishment, director Hiroshi Iuchi worked on Ikaruga at home on his spare time and developed a prototype with help from programmer Atsutomo Nakagawa. Ikaruga shares basic shooter gameplay elements with an earlier Treasure shooter, Radiant Silvergun (1998). Additionally, the polarity elements are similar to those in their earlier game Silhouette Mirage (1997). Another source of inspiration was the defense system in Shinrei Jusatsushi Taromaru (1997) for the Sega Saturn. Iuchi reused sprites from Radiant Silvergun so he could finish the prototype quickly. A unique feature to the original design was a limited ammo supply. The player's stock was replenished by absorbing enemy bullets. This mechanism was seen as weak since it created gaps in the action when no bullets could be fired. Gameplay ideas in the prototype version were later included in a special bonus mode in the final game. After further testing and consultation between team members, the final gameplay system was implemented.

Ikaruga has been described as a spiritual sequel to Radiant Silvergun. Originally, Radiant Silvergun was intended to be a trilogy, and Ikaruga began development as a direct sequel, codenamed "Project RS-2". The concept theme for Radiant Silvergun was “World”, and for Ikaruga it was “Will”. In keeping with Treasure's game design philosophy, Ikaruga was intentionally designed to challenge the conventions of standard game design and develop a new type of shooting game. The game's difficulty lies in the puzzle-like elements of changing polarities rather than bullet-dodging. Unlike Radiant Silvergun, the scoring system was not tied to gameplay. In this way, the game was designed to appeal to both players who play for score and those who did not. In the beginning, the stages were designed with the combo system in mind, however this made the optimal route too obvious. Instead, the team redesigned the stages and enemies so it would be more difficult for player to determine the route for the most optimal score. The game's pacing follows a "mountain" and "valley" approach, in which the music and action will peak, followed by a melancholy atmosphere, only to build up tempo again. By the time development was finished, 5 Treasure staff had worked on the game, as well as 3 support staff from G.rev which was raising funds to develop its own shooter, Border Down (2003).

== Release ==
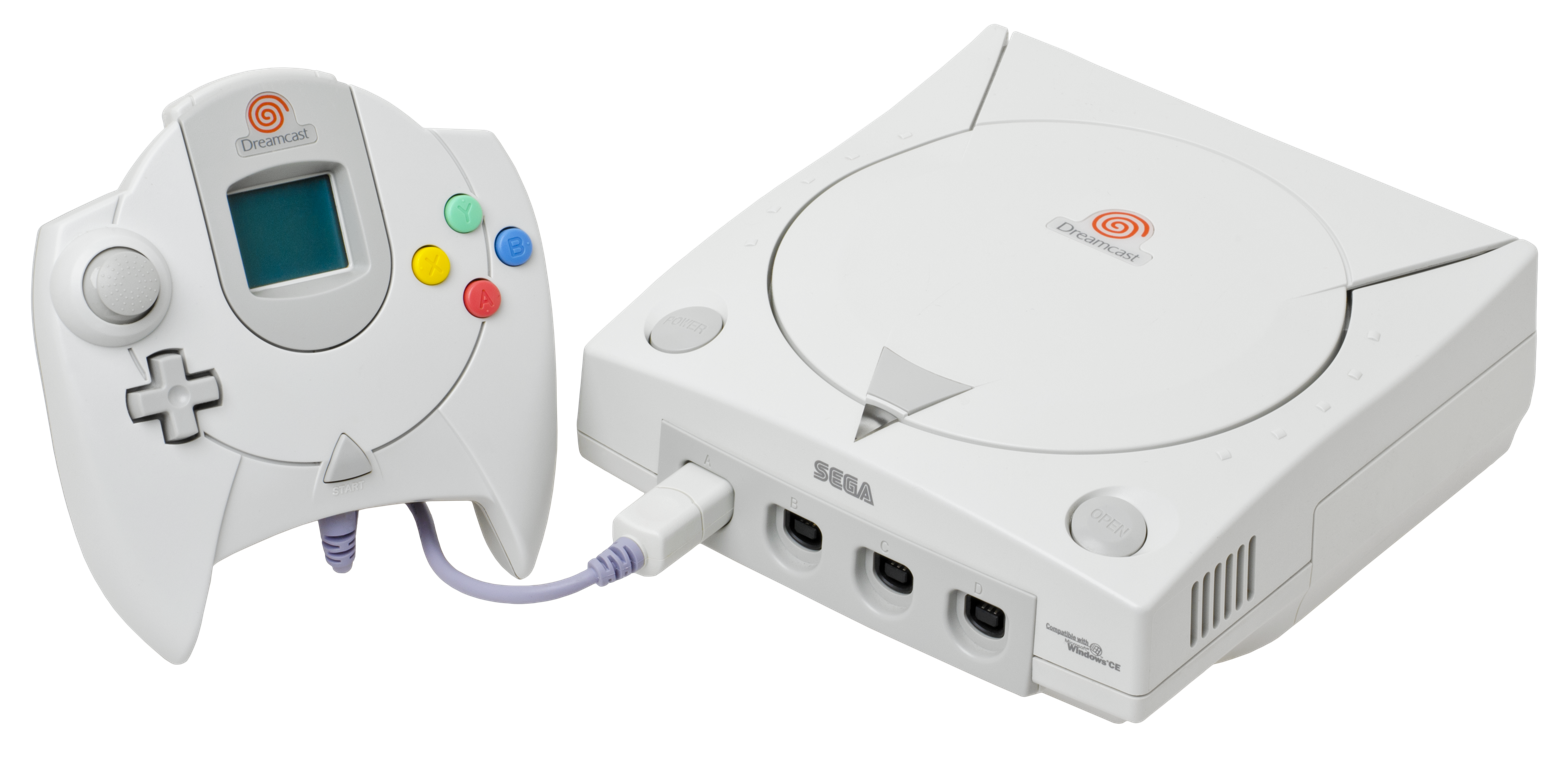
The Dreamcast port of Ikaruga was imported by gamers worldwide and gained a cult following before its official western release.

Ikaruga was targeted to Treasure's core fanbase, as pleasing them was the team's first priority. Although the game was primarily being developed for the Sega NAOMI arcade platform, it was standard for NAOMI games to be ported to the Dreamcast, and so the development team had this in mind. The NAOMI version was bug checked on a Dreamcast, so porting was very easy. Ikaruga was first released in arcades in Japan on 20 December 2001. A Dreamcast port was released exclusively in Japan on 5 September 2002. Although not yet published in the West, Ikaruga began to garner a cult following in North America among import gamers.

On August 15, 2002, it was announced that Infogrames' Japanese division had picked up the publishing rights to a GameCube version of the game and would release the title in January 2003 under the Atari brand name. The game was released in Japan on January 16, 2003. Initially, Infogrames' North American and European divisions had no plans to release the title nationwide, but on January 28, 2003, it was announced that Infogrames would publish the GameCube version in those territories as well, with representatives at the publisher citing the popularity of the title in Japan and a growing fan base around the world. The game was released in North America on April 15, and in Europe on May 9, branded under the Atari label as in Japan.

On 12 September 2007, Microsoft announced they were planning on releasing Ikaruga on Xbox Live Arcade for the Xbox 360. It was released on 9 April 2008, and included new features such as leaderboards, achievements, and the ability to record and replay playthroughs. Treasure later released Ikaruga on the arcade distribution platform, NESiCAxLive, on 8 August 2013. In October 2013, Treasure placed the title into the Steam Greenlight process to bring the game (based on the Xbox 360 version) to Microsoft Windows, with hopes to bring their other titles to the platform later. The game was released on Steam on 18 February 2014. It was also published by Nicalis for the Nintendo Switch on 29 May 2018, supporting both horizontal and vertical screen orientations. In June 2018, Ikaruga was also released on the PlayStation 4. On 22 November 2019, Nicalis announced that physical copies were in production for both the Nintendo Switch and the PlayStation 4.

== Reception and legacy ==
Contemporary reviews

Aggregate score
Aggregator	Score	
Aggregator	Dreamcast	GameCube
Metacritic	N/A	85/100

Review scores
Publication	Score	
Publication	Dreamcast	GameCube
Eurogamer	N/A	8/10
Famitsu	8/10, 8/10, 10/10, 10/10	36/40
GameSpot	8.5/10	8.8/10
IGN	N/A	8.3/10
Nintendo Life	N/A	9/10
Dorimaga	8.7/10	N/A
Power Unlimited	N/A	80%

Initial reception of Ikaruga in Japan was mixed. Players praised the visuals and music, but opinions were divided on the gameplay system. Director Hiroshi Iuchi noted that players would tell him “this isn't an arcade game...make it more thrilling and fast-paced.” Both Iuchi and producer Masoto Maegawa stated that this mixed reception was due to players expecting a more standard shooter offering. They both felt Ikaruga was a brand new type of shooter and that bringing variety was important to the growth of game centers. In February 2002, Game Machine listed the game as being the fifth most popular arcade game in Japan at the time. The original Dreamcast port of Ikaruga was well received by Greg Kasavin of GameSpot. He praised the game for its visuals, sound, and challenging difficulty. He also praised the game for bringing back a dead genre to the forefront, saying "Ikaruga takes 20 years of great ideas in game design and somehow manages to put an entirely new spin on them...for the sake of making a game that's both familiar and utterly unique."

The GameCube release received generally favorable reviews by western critics. The visuals, art design, and sound were universally praised and some criticism was directed towards the game's short length. Critics agreed that Ikaruga's game design was "innovative", "clever", and "unique". The difficulty was both highlighted for being inviting to old-school shooter fans, but was also criticized for building a barrier to genre newcomers. Tyrone Rodriguez of IGN called it "a shooter-fan's shooter," and Corbie Dillard of Nintendo Life stated "if you're a shooter fan, you absolutely must own at least one version of this masterpiece." IGN listed Ikaruga as their Game of the Month for April 2003, while GameSpot named it the best GameCube title of that month. Reception of the Xbox 360 and Windows ports was similar to the GameCube version. Topher Cantler of Destructoid gave Ikaruga a perfect score and dubbed it a "work of art". Although most critics still agreed that Ikaruga's unique game design was a positive characteristic, Simon Parkin of Eurogamer offered a counterpoint that its fresh design is also its weakness, in that it stifles many of the other elements that define shoot 'em ups and morph it into something different and "inscrutable." Reviews of the Switch port were also positive.

Ikaruga continues to be one of the most revered shooters of all time. The Xbox 360, Windows, and Switch ports have received positive reviews. IGN voted Ikaruga the 3rd greatest 2D shooter of all time. Adam Smith of Rock, Paper, Shotgun called Ikaruga one of Treasure's greatest works and "one of the most perfect games [he] ever played." Kurt Kalata of Hardcore Gaming 101 shared similar sentiments, calling it one of Treasure's most popular games, and "one of the most remarkable shooters of all time." In 2020, Slant ranked Ikaruga 92nd on its 100 Best Video Games of All Time. They praised the unique polarity gameplay saying it "stylishly revitalizes the genre."

The Dreamcast and GameCube versions sold 33,860 physical units in Japan. The Xbox Live Arcade version sold 137,088 digital units on the Xbox 360, as of 2011. The PC version has sold 128,543 digital units on Steam, as of 1 July 2018.
