= Yu Yu Hakusho Makyō Tōitsusen =

1994 video game

Yū Yū Hakusho Makyō Tōitsusen
- Developer: Treasure
- Publishers: JP: Sega; BR: Tec Toy
- Director: Tetsuhiko Kikuchi
- Programmers: Masaki Ukyo; Mitsuru Yaida
- Artists: Tetsuhiko Kikuchi; Makoto Ogino; Hiroshi Iuchi
- Composers: Satoshi Murata; Katsuhiko Suzuki; Aki Hata; Norio Hanzawa
- Series: Yu Yu Hakusho
- Platform: Mega Drive
- Release: JP: September 30, 1994; BR: 1999
- Genre: Fighting
- Modes: Single-player, multiplayer

Yu Yu Hakusho Makyō Tōitsusen is a 1994 fighting game developed by Treasure and published by Sega for the Mega Drive. It is based on the manga series Yu Yu Hakusho by Yoshihiro Togashi. The plot follows the protagonist Yusuke Urameshi, who is tasked by the ruler of the afterlife with solving detective-style cases involving both humans and demons threatening the living world. The story begins to focus heavily on martial arts battles as it progresses.

The game features 11 playable characters from the manga and traditional 2D fighting gameplay. Opponents compete in rounds, attempting to deplete each other's health by utilizing short and long-range attacks and special combos. It also integrates other mechanics, such as allowing up to four players to compete simultaneously and letting fighters alternate between horizontal planes in the foreground and background. A number of multiplayer options are available that include battle royales, tag team matches, and tournament modes.

Makyō Tōitsusen was produced at the height of a global fighting game boom for home consoles in the early 1990s, brought on by hits like Street Fighter II. After the company made its debut on the system with Gunstar Heroes, Treasure began development on Makyō Tōitsusen as one of a quartet of Mega Drive games to be published by Sega. Unlike the rest of these titles, Makyō Tōitsusen was never localized in North America or Europe. The game's only other official release was in Brazil via Tec Toy in 1999 where it was titled Yu Yu Hakusho: Sunset Fighters. The game did not receive any form of re-release until its inclusion on the Japanese Sega Mega Drive Mini in 2019. Despite its limited availability, the game has been assessed by several publications outside those two regions and enjoyed a mostly positive response from critics. The gameplay and four-player options were praised by many reviewers, several of which have even considered it among the best fighting games of the 16-bit generation, although its graphics and sound received criticism.

== Gameplay ==
Four fighters participate in a match on two separate horizontal planes. The characters' health and spirit energy are displayed at the top of the screen.

Yu Yu Hakusho Makyō Tōitsusen is fighting game based on the supernatural manga series Yu Yu Hakusho, written and illustrated by Yoshihiro Togashi. The manga follows protagonist Yusuke Urameshi, a juvenile delinquent who sacrifices his life to save a child and is resurrected by the ruler of the afterlife in order to solve detective-style cases involving humans and demons threatening the living world. The plot puts a heavy emphasis on martial arts battles as it progresses. Makyō Tōitsusen allows the player to choose one of 11 key characters from the manga: Urameshi, Kurama, Hiei, Kazuma Kuwabara, Genkai, the Toguro brothers, Chū, Jin, Shinobu Sensui and Itsuki. It has no story mode, does not adapt or tie into the plot of its source material, and features few appearances from the supporting cast. The game adopts a versus fighting game template made popular by the Street Fighter series where the objective of each match is for the player or players to eliminate opponents by depleting their health gauges using various short and long-ranged attacks. Fighters move horizontally on 2D battlefields and can jump from the ground toward or over opponents. One-on-one matches are possible, but Makyō Tōitsusen allows up to four characters to battle simultaneously in a single match. This added action is complemented by the inclusion of a second layer in each stage. Similar to the Fatal Fury series, players can leap onto a separate horizontal plane in the background. Matches have no time limit.

Since multiple opponents can potentially face either in front of or behind the player, pushing back on the controller's directional pad will cause a character to face the opposite direction rather than simply back away or block enemy attacks. Makyō Tōitsusen is compatible with both the Mega Drive's three-button and six-button gamepads. The three-button controller's "A", "B", and "C" face buttons can be mapped to light attack, heavy attack, and guard, while movement actions like dashing forward, dashing backward, and shifting planes are performed using basic combinations of the directional pad and face buttons. The additional "X", "Y", and "Z" inputs on the six-button controller allow for mapping these six actions to one face button each. All characters can use combos and unique special attacks that may be performed either on the ground or in the air, some of which can be charged for larger amounts of damage. Since the three-button controller is standard and pushing the back button changes a character's direction, combos are fairly simple to execute. A few abilities require "spirit energy" that is represented by a second gauge under a fighter's health and can be refilled by holding down an attack button. A charged attack can be temporarily cancelled and stored by pushing back on the directional pad and then instantly unleashed at that strength the next time the player uses it. The game offers several modes that consist of a single-player campaign for fighting consecutive one-on-one matches; an endless practice mode; and multiplayer options further divided into four-participant battle royales and tag team matches with opposing teams of two. A bracketed tournament mode can also be chosen where individual players, teams of players, and the computer can battle until a final championship match. Up to four human players can participate in these multiplayer modes using Sega's Team Player multitap device.

== Development and release ==
Yu Yu Hakusho Makyō Tōitsusen was developed by Treasure and was produced in association with Yu Yu Hakusho author Yoshihiro Togashi, the manga's publisher Shueisha, the anime adaptation's Studio Pierrot, and its television broadcaster Fuji TV. The home video game console market of the early 1990s was in the midst of a fighting game craze thanks to hits such as Street Fighter II. The concurrent popularity of Yu Yu Hakusho in Japan led to games in this genre showing up on several home and handheld gaming platforms. After Treasure's debut on the Mega Drive with Gunstar Heroes, Makyō Tōitsusen was one of four games in simultaneous development by the company for the system with Sega as publisher. Makyō Tōitsusen is Treasure's first fighting game and its second game based on a licensed property, after McDonald's Treasure Land Adventure.

Treasure initially made Makyō Tōitsusen as an original game titled Axion before converting it into a Yu Yu Hakusho title. The project was directed by Tetsuhiko Kikuchi and supervised by Treasure founder and president Masato Maegawa. According to Kikuchi, Axion was conceived sometime in 1993 when the company noticed a lack of unique Mega Drive-exclusive fighting titles. However, production stalled when a game with a similar world and concepts was set to beat Axion to market. Treasure's plans for their game were reconsidered many times before the Yu Yu Hakusho license was integrated, which Kikuchi believed would assure good sales. Maegawa said that the controls and gameplay mechanics, including the multiplanar stages, were already created for Axion before the arduous process of reworking the game with Yu Yu Hakusho assets. Sega assigned Yoichi Shimosato to support the game's production after he joined the company's Third Consumer Research Division in 1993. Despite the developer's seemingly close relationship with Sega, Maegawa claimed the publisher's communication was poor and that it offered no help to Treasure during the game's creation.

Treasure's staff was made up chiefly of Kikuchi as director and main graphic designer; graphic artists Makoto Ogino and Hiroshi Iuchi; programmers Masaki Ukyo and Mitsuru Yaida; and lead sound effects and music composer Satoshi Murata. Kikuchi was appreciative of the game's animators for their use of character sprite shadows, but implied that their disregard for how much memory they required created difficulties. Ukyo found it most challenging to program having four characters on-screen simultaneous and give them the ability to freely change the direction they face. Alongside Katsuhiko Suzuki, Aki Hata, and Norio Hanzawa, Murata composed original music tracks for the game while also providing instrumental versions of the songs Hohoemi no Bakudan and Unbalance na Kiss o Shite from the Yu Yu Hakusho anime. The game's main theme, "Tokenai Hono" (溶けない炎, Insoluble Flame), was written and arranged by Hata, who also performed a vocal version of the song for its official soundtrack CD and later one of her own albums. The game also features an extensive array of digitized character voice samples portrayed the anime's voice cast. Kikuchi was satisfied with the quality of the game's voices despite the Mega Drive's inferior ability to synthesize voices when compared to the console's main competitor, the Super Famicom.

Makyō Tōitsusen was released in Japan on September 30, 1994. The Mega Drive was less commercially successful in Japan than it was overseas and because Treasure maintained profits by shipping small numbers of its products, few units of the game went to retail. Maegawa insisted that Treasure always developed games with foreign markets in mind. Despite these factors, Makyō Tōitsusen was never officially localized in North America or Europe, perhaps due to the Yu Yu Hakusho franchise being relatively unknown in those regions during the Mega Drive's lifespan. It remains the only Mega Drive game by Treasure not to see a release in these territories. However, the game was licensed by TecToy, translated into Portuguese, and released in Brazil in 1999 as Yu Yu Hakusho: Sunset Fighters. A Portuguese dub of the anime by Rede Manchete had already begun airing in South America, while the Mega Drive maintained a strong presence in Brazil throughout the decade largely due to a distribution partnership between Tec Toy and Sega. Other than the text, the two versions of Makyō Tōitsusen are nearly identical. The Portuguese translation is mostly faithful to the original Japanese text, though some character names were altered. Like the Japanese edition, very few copies were shipped. Makyō Tōitsusen did not see a digital re-release for over two decades after its initial debut, likely due to licensing issues. After the success of Nintendo's NES and Super NES Classic Editions in 2016 and 2017 respectively, Maegawa expressed interest in Sega releasing a similar dedicated version of the Mega Drive. The Mega Drive Mini was ultimately released worldwide in 2019 and Makyō Tōitsusen was included on its Japanese version.

== Reception and legacy ==
Reception

Review scores
Publication	Score
Beep! MegaDrive	7.75/10
Famitsu	6/10, 5/10, 7/10, 7/10
Joypad	90%
Mean Machines Sega	76%
Retro Gamer	95%
Ação Games	9/10
Mega Console	81/100
PlayStation Magazine (JP)	24.2/30

Upon its release, Yu Yu Hakusho Makyō Tōitsusen was given average review scores from panels in major Japanese magazines like Famitsu and Beep! MegaDrive. Although it never had an official localization in any region other than South America, it was imported by print and online publications in North America and Europe and met with greater acclaim there. Nick Des Barres of GameFan, Tom Stratton of Gamer's Republic, and the editors of Retro Gamer have all heaped praise on the game. Des Barres called it "the best 16-bit fighting game ever" in a 1994 review and concluded that "Yu Yu Hakusho is a game that truly has to be seen to be believed". Stratton likewise described it in 1999 as "easily one of the best 16-bit fighters there has ever been". Retro Gamer has repeatedly lauded the game, describing it as possibly the best Yu Yu Hakusho game and among the best Mega Drive games and fighting games of the 16-bit era. Kurt Kulata of Hardcore Gaming 101 said that the game managed to become of the best anime license games that can stand against other tournament fighting games.

The gameplay and multiplayer options were high points for many reviewers. Retro Gamer summarized Makyō Tōitsusen as "highly enjoyable in single-player" as an over-the-top and zany anime-styled brawler, in addition praising the multiplayer as well. Stratton, Kulata, and Electronic Gaming Monthly (EGM) all found the gameplay to be well-balanced. Stratton used the game's dual layer stages as an example of how this balance was accomplished, explaining that players could tactically parry enemies by switching planes or charge an attack to meet an opponent jumping into their plane. Kulata similarly credited the plane-shifting mechanic for allowing an equal emphasis on player defense and offense and noted that projectile attacks are made less powerful than standard punches and kicks, as opposed to its fighting genre contemporaries. Mean Machines Sega writers Gus Swan and Steve Merrett and Anime News Network contributor Todd Ciolek were all pleased with the variety of extra game modes. However, Swan and Merrett were more critical of the gameplay overall, pointing to a "sluggish" pace and simple-minded computer AI. The duo stated that the game paled in comparison to Street Fighter II and Mortal Kombat II, both of which were more accessible to Western gamers in 1994. EGM admitted to having difficulty keeping up with the action with multiple characters in a single battle.

Reception for the graphics and sound of Makyō Tōitsusen has been mixed. Des Barres, Stratton, Kulata, and Retro Gamer all had positive comments regarding its visuals and audio. Retro Gamer felt the game boasted "slick animations and detailed character sprites", while both Des Barres and Stratton thought the characters properly mimicked their anime counterparts. Kulata was especially impressed with the backgrounds, which utilize various effects such as parallax, transparencies, and warping. Des Barres and Retro Gamer enjoyed the music, the former proclaiming it to be "the best Mega Drive music" he had ever heard. Kulata made similar, constructive remarks about its voice samples and sound effects, but considered the soundtrack to be "forgettable" in contrast to other Mega Drive games by Treasure. Ciolek opined that Treasure focused too much on refining the gameplay and failed to fully develop its presentation. He criticized it for having small character sprites, a "bland" soundtrack, "scratchy" voice-overs, and dynamic backgrounds that "try to compensate for frequently boring scenery with changes in lighting". Swan and Merrett were complimentary of the sprite animation and voice sample quality, but echoed complaints that the backgrounds lacked detail and coloring and that the soundtrack was "not up to the standard of Treasure's other in-game music". Retro Gamer agreed that the backgrounds were "drab" and "unfinished" when compared to the rest of the game's aesthetic. EGM seconded the notion that the sprites were too small while also experiencing "break-up" when too many present were on-screen at once.

Treasure's next fighting game, Guardian Heroes, was released for the Sega Saturn in 1996. This game features 2D sprites and gameplay mechanics resembling Makyō Tōitsusen like simplified combos and multiple horizontal planes in battle. For Guardian Heroes, Treasure president Masato Maegawa told gamesTM that the developer wanted to "evolve" what they had created in Makyō Tōitsusen into an original game with "more madness and excess". Treasure also carried this design over into two Nintendo DS fighting games that are based on the manga series Bleach. This includes supporting up to four players simultaneously and having two horizontal planes between which players can switch during fights.
