= Radiant Silvergun =

1998 shooter video game

- Original arcade flyer
- Developer: Treasure
- Publishers: Treasure (Arcade and Saturn); ESP (Saturn); Microsoft Studios (X360); Live Wire (Switch, PC)
- Director: Hiroshi Iuchi
- Producer: Hiroshi Iuchi
- Composer: Hitoshi Sakimoto
- Platforms: Arcade; Sega Saturn; Xbox 360; Nintendo Switch; Windows
- Release: Arcade: JP: May 28, 1998; Sega Saturn: JP: July 23, 1998; Xbox 360: WW: September 14, 2011; Nintendo Switch: WW: September 13, 2022; Windows: WW: November 2, 2023
- Genre: Shoot 'em up
- Modes: Single-player, multiplayer
- Arcade system: ST-V

Radiant Silvergun (Note: Japanese: レイディアントシルバーガン, Hepburn: Reidianto Shirubāgan) is a shoot 'em up video game developed and published by Treasure. It was originally released in Japanese arcades in 1998 and subsequently ported to the Sega Saturn later that year. The story follows a team of fighter pilots in the far future who are battling waves of enemies summoned by a mysterious crystal dug up from the Earth. The player hosts an arsenal of six different types of shots to choose from, and a sword to destroy nearby targets. The stages are tightly designed to present players with scenarios that can be approached differently with the various weapon types.

Treasure was primarily known for developing action and platform games for home consoles before Radiant Silvergun. Despite the company's concerns about the financial viability of arcade games and the shooter genre, they felt they had a good premise for a game and decided to pursue it. Radiant Silvergun was developed by ten people, with Gonzo outsourced for animated cutscenes. The game was developed for the ST-V arcade board first and later ported to the architecturally similar Sega Saturn. Towards the end of development, the team recruited professional gamers that held high scores in shooters to play test the game.

Radiant Silvergun was first released in Japanese arcades in May 1998. Treasure president Masato Maegawa went in person to arcades to gauge the reaction of players. The Saturn port was released two months later in Japan. Despite its region exclusivity, Radiant Silvergun was imported by Western critics and received critical acclaim. Journalists agreed that the game revived the shoot 'em up genre, which had fallen by the wayside after the rise in popularity of arcade fighting games in the 1990s. In retrospect, it is considered one of the greatest shooters and Sega Saturn games of all time. It received a spiritual sequel in the form of Ikaruga (2001), and was ported worldwide to the Xbox 360 in 2011, to the Nintendo Switch in 2022 and to Windows in 2023.

== Gameplay ==
A player using the spread gun

Radiant Silvergun is a vertically scrolling shoot 'em up. The player is given a wide arsenal from the start of the game featuring three primary weapons: strong forward laser, weak homing projectiles, and a spread gun which fires pairs of exploding projectiles at a wide angle. Combining any of these weapons with another will result in one of three new types of attack: a rear firing laser (laser + spread), an auto-targeting plasma beam (laser + homing), and a close range missile targeting system (homing + spread). Using all 3 weapons together activates a sword that can be swung around the ship to damage nearby enemies and defensively absorb a common type of enemy projectile. Absorbing enemy fire charges up the sword for a screen-clearing special attack. The stages are methodically and tightly paced with carefully crafted scenarios that can be approached differently with the varying weapons.

The game's scoring system is based on enemy color. All enemies are one of three colors: red, blue, or yellow. Destroying three enemies of the same color in a row starts a bonus scoring chain. Destroying another set of the same color continues the chain and increases the bonus, while shooting another color resets it. Unlike Ikaruga, switching colors between sets breaks the chain. In addition to gaining a higher score, chains contribute to leveling up the weapon being used, increasing its effectiveness. The weapons stay powered up for the remainder of the game. The player can also obtain extra points by destroying bosses more methodically. Each boss has different segments and appendages that can be destroyed before targeting their weak spot. If all these segments are destroyed first, the player will earn a greater bonus. There are also hidden dogs that when shot, will give the player bonus points and unlock more game options.

== Plot ==
The story of Radiant Silvergun is told non-linearly through animated videos and scripted dialogue between stages. In the year 2520, scientists on Earth have unearthed a giant crystal along with an ancient robot bearing the same serial number as another robot called "Creator" on the Tetra spaceship orbiting around Earth. The crystal creates a massive explosion, engulfing the Earth and killing all humans except for the remaining four on the spaceship. One year later, exhausted of supplies, they return to Earth in fighter jets known as Silverguns, fighting through hordes of enemies until they reach the crystal, which is referred to as “the Stone-Like”. After battling the Stone-Like and failing to destroy it, it brings the last two remaining pilots 100,000 years into the past, and tells them that it is the guardian of the Earth and destroyed humans in order to protect the planet, before destroying the last two humans in another explosion. 20 years later, still in the distant past, the Creator uses DNA from the pilots of the Silverguns to create clones and start humanity anew before the Creator finally breaks down for good, bringing the story into a loop.

== Development ==
=== Background ===
Since the company's inception, Treasure had primarily been a developer of action and platform games for home consoles. Sega had repeatedly asked the company to develop an arcade game for them, but Treasure president Masato Maegawa was concerned the shrinking arcade business would be too risky from a business perspective and arcade goers would not appreciate the effort placed into their game. Despite this concern the team had wanted to develop a 2D arcade style shoot 'em up for some time. Much of the staff were fans of the genre, having grown up during the genre's golden age, but entering their careers after fighting games started filling arcades. Director Hiroshi Iuchi was especially passionate about starting the project. Although the team was eager to develop the game, there were still concerns. Maegawa believed that the shoot 'em up genre was dying, and was risky from a sales perspective. Iuchi was also concerned there would be no place for a 2D shooter in an arcade space that was advancing more towards large and specialized 3D game machines. In the face of these concerns about commercial viability, the team felt they had a good concept and pushed forth.

Iuchi thought arcade developers of the era were not innovating enough and only settling for rehashes of old ideas. He thought shooting games at the time were most commonly in the style of Toaplan-developed vertical shooters, but he remembered in the past when developers like Konami and Irem had distinct shooter styles. In response to this, Iuchi's first thought was to develop a non-Toaplan style shooter. He claimed to have the idea for Radiant Silvergun long before it was released, not pulling any influence from games of the era. The key philosophies he carried was to make a classic style game, but make it unlike anything else. He was a big fan of Irem's Image Fight (1988), and believes that some of that inspiration is reflected in Radiant Silvergun.

The Treasure team wanted to develop the game for home console in addition to arcades. They agreed the game had to be released in arcades first, as a console exclusive shooter may be a hard sell. They hoped the game would appeal to shooting fans in the arcades while also convincing home console players that shooters were still fun. Maegawa thought it would be best to keep the arcade and console portions of the development cycle separate, because arcades and consoles are so different. Iuchi treated the arcade version as the "test version" with the console version released soon after that. He believed that if the team was not successful with the console port, the 2D shoot 'em up genre would soon die.

=== Production ===
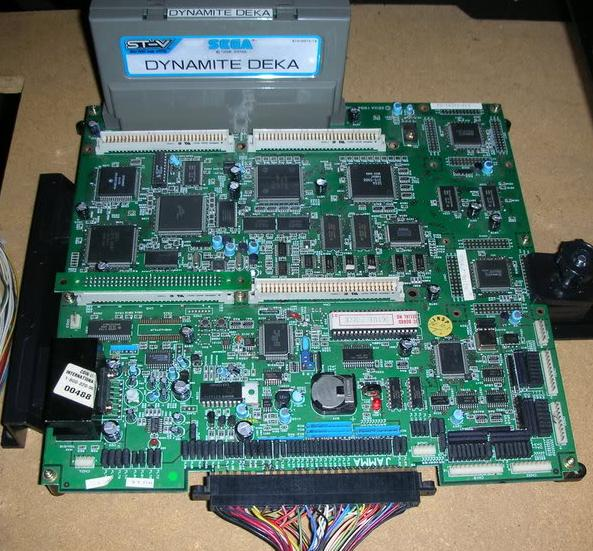
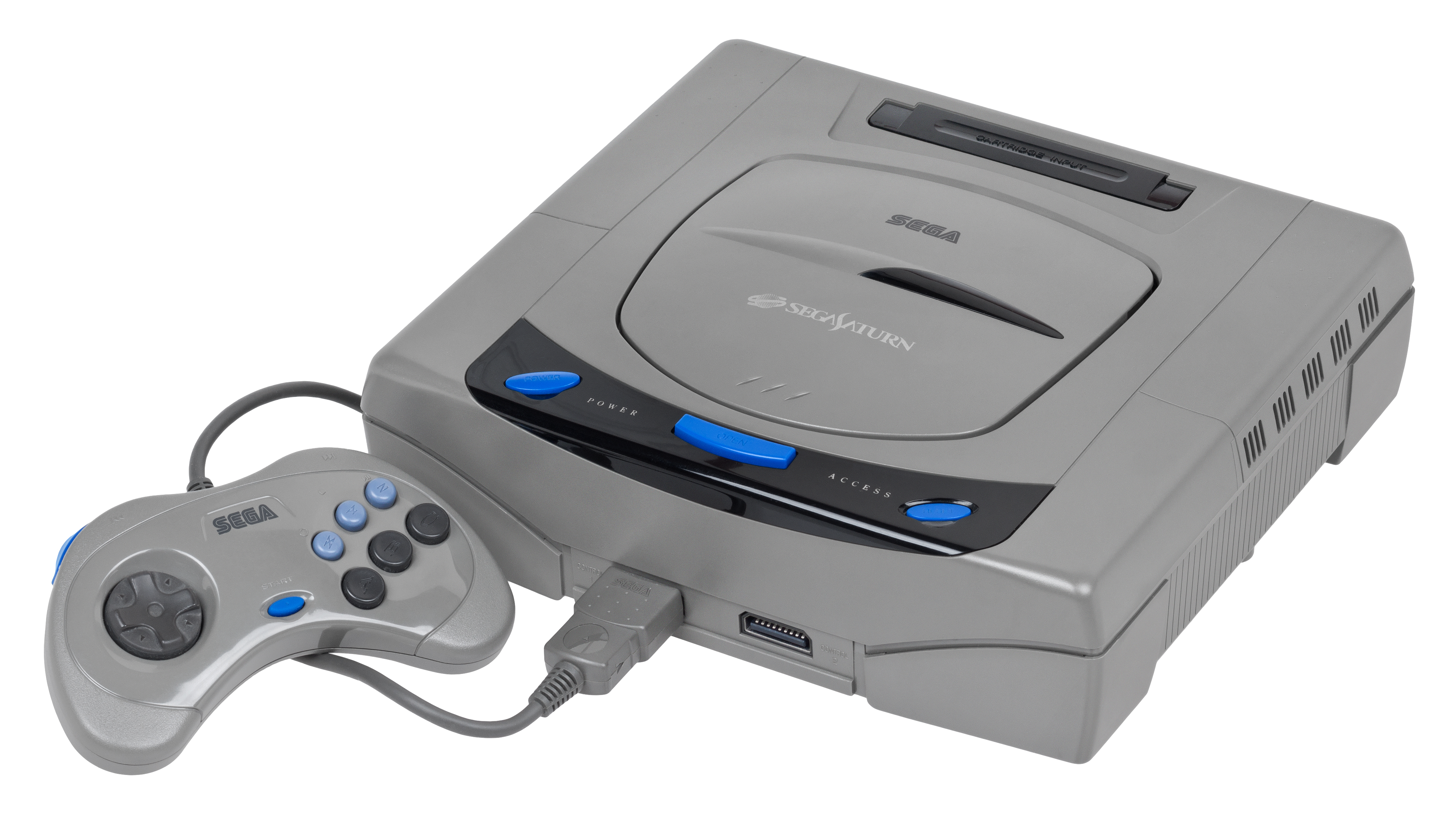
Radiant Silvergun was developed for the ST-V arcade board (left) and the Sega Saturn (right).

Development on Radiant Silvergun started in late 1997, and progressed smoothly as opposed to past projects where they had to scrap ideas and restart from scratch. The title is in reference to an early concept that had people flying through the sky holding silver guns in each hand. Some of the staff thought the name was difficult to remember, but Iuchi believed that if it was hard to remember, it was hard to forget. Only ten people worked on the game, including three programmers, four artists, and one sound designer. They chose to develop for the Sega ST-V arcade board because Treasure had normally developed games for Sega and it was similar to the Sega Saturn home console, which they were planning on porting the game to. The team had knowledge of the Sega Saturn's hardware from developing previous games for it, so they believed it would be easier this time around. They did not use any expensive hardware, just conventional computers. They used LightWave for the 3D objects and freeware downloaded from the internet to make the 2D graphics. The programmers and designers worked hard to use every bit of power from Sega's hardware.

Iuchi did not include power-ups in Radiant Silvergun because he felt they were distracting, and he often found himself dying when trying to manage different weapons and items. To combat this, he made the game progress simply through shooting and dodging, and mapped weapons to individual buttons and button combinations instead of needing to press a button to cycle through weapons. The team also made the bullets deliberately slow to appeal to a wider playing audience. The team recruited animation studio Gonzo to create movie sequences with deeper story elements for the Saturn version. These sequences were not included in the arcade version because players there do not want to wait through story sequences. Gonzo had previously done animation for Treasure's Silhouette Mirage (1997) and Iuchi was happy with the outcome of their work on Radiant Silvergun. The game's music was composed by Hitoshi Sakimoto.

Towards the end of development, Maegawa could not finish the game to properly debug it because it was too difficult. He brought in skilled players who held national records at shooters to debug the game.

=== Release ===
Radiant Silvergun was released in Japanese arcades on May 28, 1998. The team was anxious about whether it was going to be received well in arcades since it was such a unique shooter and their first arcade game, so Maegawa went in person to arcades to gauge the player reaction. He later said they observed people playing the game for a very long time, which made them happy. The game was released at retail for the Sega Saturn on July 23, 1998, and sold around 50,000 copies.

== Reception ==
Reception (Sega Saturn)

Review scores
Publication	Score
Computer and Video Games	5/5
Edge	8/10
GameSpot	9/10
Arcade	5/5
Sega Saturn Magazine (UK)	95%
Sega Saturn Magazine (JP)	8.0/10 (Note: Score is an average of three scores from individual reviewers: 7, 8, and 9.)

In July 1998, Game Machine listed the game as being the fifth most popular arcade game in Japan at the time.

The Sega Saturn port of Radiant Silvergun received critical acclaim, with some calling it one of the best shoot 'em ups ever made. Critics agreed that Treasure successfully revived and redefined the shooter genre following a period of stagnation in the wake of the advent of fighting games during the 16-bit era.

Several journalists commented on the game's visuals. Edge wrote the game was "arguably the finest technical showcase the Saturn has ever played host to." They praised the parallax backdrops, Mode 7 style distortion effects, and use of 3D polygons to create imaginative bosses. They felt the game was a successful attempt to push the Sega Saturn's graphical capabilities to its limits, calling it "a wonder to behold." Sega Saturn Magazine also thought the game had some of the most impressive Sega Saturn graphics, and highlighted the great mix of 2D and 3D graphics. Computer and Video Games thought the game outclassed graphics capable on the PlayStation or Nintendo 64. Arcade called it a "gorgeous" and "sense-pummeling" shooter with spectacular explosions and visual effects.

Critics also praised Radiant Silvergun's gameplay, and most commonly highlighted its replayability thanks to the depth of its scoring system and hidden bonuses. Arcade called it "the kind of repeat play magnetism that makes you wonder why 2D shoot 'em ups fell from grace in the first place." Sega Saturn Magazine argued that there are role-playing games with less depth than Radiant Silvergun. Edge claimed that Treasure's commitment to "old school" gaming principles paid off, and praised the game's hardcore appeal. Both Edge and Sega Saturn Magazine shared positive thoughts on the game's weapon systems, and also agreed that it was satisfyingly difficult, although Edge complained that sometimes it sacrificed fairness for visual flair. GameSpot concluded their thoughts saying: "This game is an absolute must-buy. Never has a shooter combined relentless, thoughtfully-designed action with such stunning graphics and sound...Radiant Silvergun makes you feel as if you've never really played a shooter before. It's a whole new experience."

== Legacy ==
In retrospective reviews, Radiant Silvergun is considered one of the greatest shooters of all time, and one of the best Sega Saturn games. IGN called Radiant Silvergun a "milestone in shooter design" and in 2008 listed it as their number one classic shoot 'em up. In 2005, IGN also compiled all their reader's review ratings of the 31,000 games in their database, among which Radiant Silvergun reached the twelfth spot. Because of the game's limited availability, it soon became an expensive and sought after collector's item, selling for at least US$150 by 2011.

The game received a spiritual successor in the form of Ikaruga (2001), which was originally subtitled Radiant Silvergun 2. It was first released on the Sega NAOMI arcade platform until later being ported to the Dreamcast and GameCube. Like its predecessor, Ikaruga gained a reputation as one of the greatest shooters ever made. It was rereleased in 2008 on the Xbox 360.

=== Xbox 360 port ===
Following Ikaruga's rerelease, fans began asking Treasure why Radiant Silvergun had not been rereleased as well, so Treasure began work on a port. At first, the port was being developed solely by Katsuhiro Sanjo at Treasure until others assisted. Development lasted two and a half years. Sanjo stated that bringing Radiant Silvergun to the Xbox 360 was more difficult than anticipated. He had difficulties recreating some of the backgrounds and the Saturn's special effects. In October 2010, Microsoft announced the game was coming to the Xbox Live Arcade in 2011, marking the game's first official release in the West.

The port features online and offline cooperative play, leaderboards, downloadable replays, and an option to play with updated graphics. There is also an option for a scoring system based on Ikaruga. It was released on 14 September 2011 garnering "generally favorable" reviews according to ratings aggregator Metacritic. Critics praised the new high-resolution graphics options and new online modes and enhancements. They also appreciated the rerelease for giving more people the opportunity to play it given the Saturn version's expensive cost on second hand markets.

The Xbox 360 version was ported and released to the Nintendo Switch in September 2022. It was briefly pulled from the online store in North America at release due to a change in the game's content rating, but was added back six days later. The game was released on Steam in November 2023.
