= Gunstar Heroes =

1993 video game

- North American cover art
- Developer: Treasure (Note: Ported to Game Gear and 3DS by M2)
- Publisher: Sega
- Producer: Masato Maegawa
- Programmers: Mitsuru Yaida; Hideyuki Suganami
- Artists: Tetsuhiko Kikuchi; Hiroshi Iuchi
- Composer: Norio Hanzawa
- Platforms: Sega Genesis, Game Gear, Nintendo 3DS
- Release: September 10, 1993: Sega Genesis; JP: September 10, 1993; WW: September 1993 Game Gear; JP: March 24, 1995 Nintendo 3DS; JP: June 24, 2015; WW: August 20, 2015
- Genre: Run and gun
- Modes: Single-player, multiplayer

Gunstar Heroes (Note: Gansutā Hīrōzu (ガンスターヒーローズ) in Japan) is a 1993 run and gun video game developed by Treasure and published by Sega for the Sega Genesis. It was Treasure's first developed video game. The premise is centered around a pair of characters, the Gunstars, in their efforts to stop an evil empire from recovering four powerful gems. The characters can fire guns and perform a series of acrobatic maneuvers to fight enemies across each stage. There are four weapons which can be combined with one another to create different shot types.

Development on Gunstar Heroes began among a team of staff working at Konami in 1991. Following an unwillingness of Konami to embrace their original game ideas, the team quit in 1992 and formed Treasure to see their project through. The team wanted to develop their game for the Genesis because of the system's powerful Motorola 68000 microprocessor. Sega initially rejected their proposal, but later granted approval after they worked for Sega for several months on McDonald's Treasure Land Adventure (1993). Treasure worked on both games in parallel, and released Gunstar Heroes as their first game in 1993.

Gunstar Heroes was a critical success, being praised for its frantic action and advanced graphics. It helped establish Treasure's place in the industry, and introduced numerous design conventions which would become characteristic of their later work such as large bosses and a unique sense of humor. It was re-released several times, including dedicated ports to the Game Gear and Nintendo 3DS, and received a sequel on the Game Boy Advance. In retrospect, it is considered one of the best action games of the 16-bit era, and one of the best video games of all time by several publications.

== Gameplay ==
The player runs to the right as they fire the machine gun.

Gunstar Heroes is a run and gun game which is played from a side-scrolling perspective similar to Contra. The game can be played in single-player, or cooperatively with a partner. The players take on the role of Gunstar Red and Gunstar Blue as they battle with an evil empire for control over a set of powerful gems. The game features seven stages, of which the first four can be played in any order. The stage formats vary. While some feature a left-to-right format, others include the player riding in a mine cart along walls, fighting enemies on a helicopter, or playing a board game. Completing a level grants the player an extension to their maximum health, known as vitality in the game.

When starting the game, the player can choose either a free or fixed firing stance; the free stance allows the player to move in the direction they are firing, while the fixed stance immobilizes the character when shooting. The player also has a choice of starting weapon. There are four shot types in the game: a homing shot, lightning blaster, flamethrower, and machine gun. Every weapon has its strengths and weaknesses, and can be swapped with others from item drops. The weapons can be combined with each other to produce unique shot types. For example, the homing shot can be combined with the machine gun to add a homing effect to the latter, or two lightning shots can be combined to create a more powerful lightning gun. In addition to firing their weapon, the player characters can perform a series of acrobatic maneuvers including jumping, sliding, and grabbing and throwing enemies.

== Development ==
In 1991, several Konami employees led by programmer Masato Maegawa began holding planning sessions at coffee shops for an original game. They were establishing early concepts for an action shooting game, a genre they were familiar with. They pitched their idea to Konami, but were told it would not sell and it was rejected. Maegawa and his team were growing frustrated with the industry's reliance on sequels to established franchises and console conversions of arcade games to generate revenue. They felt Konami had fallen into this pattern as a large company, growing reliant on sequels in their Castlevania and Teenage Mutant Ninja Turtles series. Maegawa and his team felt consumers wanted original games, and so in 1992, they left Konami and established Treasure to continue development on their unique game.

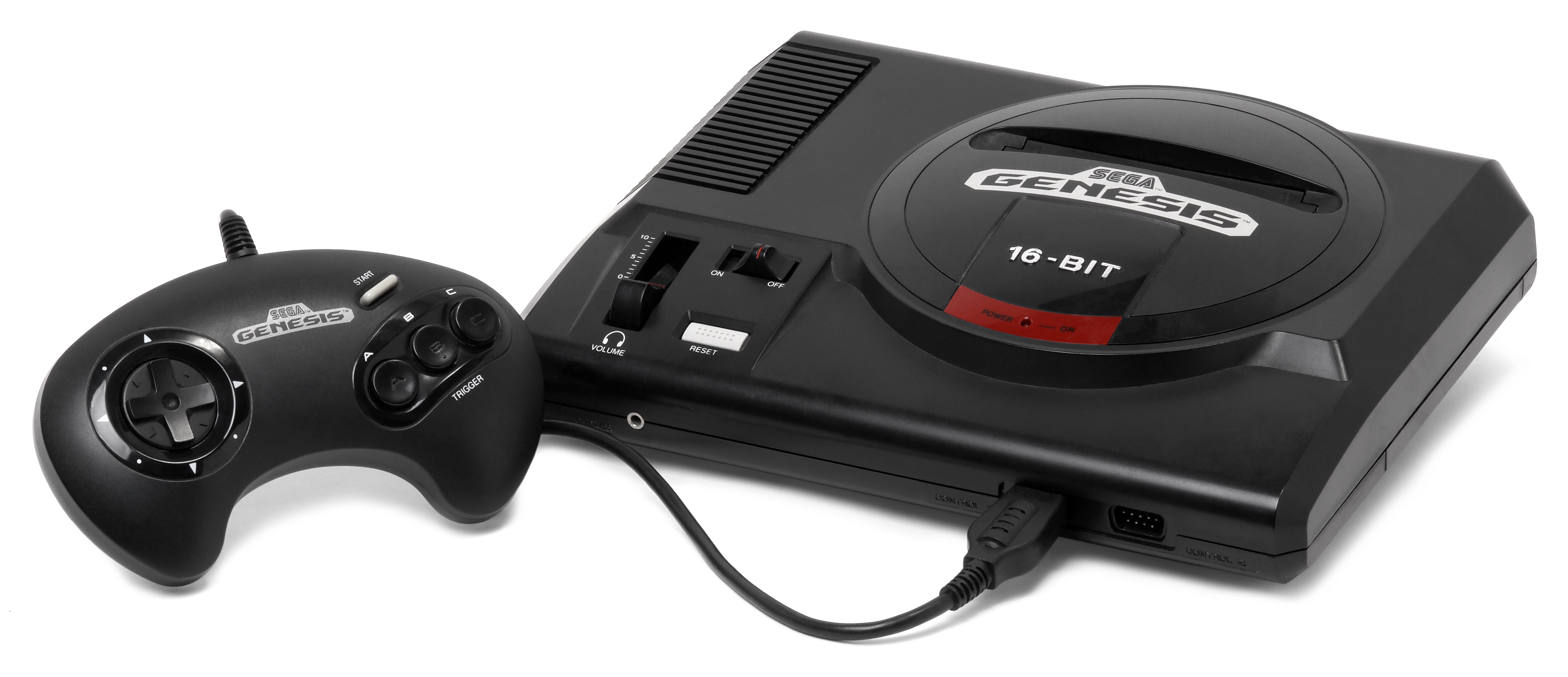
Treasure believed the Motorola 68000 microprocessor in the Sega Genesis was best suited for the action games they wanted to make.

Treasure wanted to develop their game for the Sega Genesis. Maegawa liked the platform because of its Motorola 68000 microprocessor, which he felt was easier to program for than the Super NES, and more powerful. The team decided to approach Sega for a publishing contract. When they presented their design documents to Sega, they were not granted approval because they lacked a proven track record. Instead, Sega contracted Treasure to develop McDonald's Treasure Land Adventure (1993). Several months into development, they were granted approval to work on their game. They were initially using the working title Lunatic Gunstar, thinking "Lunatic" was a good description of the stimulating action. Sega of America felt the word held a negative connotation, so rejected it. The team also considered Blade Gunner, in homage to Blade Runner, but this was also rejected due to copyright restrictions. Sega of America eventually suggested the word "Heroes", so Gunstar Heroes became the final title.

Treasure consisted of around 18 people, most being programmers from Konami. The staff was split in half to work on both Gunstar Heroes and McDonald's Treasure Land Adventure in parallel. The core team behind Gunstar Heroes consisted of six people: two programmers, two graphic designers, and two sound programmers. The staff (known by their nicknames) was composed of main programmer Yaiman, enemy and boss programmer Nami, graphic designers Han and Iuchi, composer Non, and sound effects programmer Murata. The role of game designer did not exist within Treasure. All game design and planning was undertaken by everyone involved. The team felt they had more freedom working under Sega than Konami. Maegawa got approval to add a Treasure logo when the game booted, which he felt was a rare opportunity for developers to receive during that era.

The Genesis's processor made multi-limbed bosses like "Seven Force" possible.

Development of Gunstar Heroes lasted around nine to ten months. It was the team's first experience programming for the Genesis, having come off of programming for the Super NES at Konami. Programmers Mitsuru Yaida and Hideyuki Suganami previously programmed Contra III: The Alien Wars (1992) for the Super NES at Konami. The team felt the Genesis's processor was more powerful, capable, and friendly to experimentation than other consoles. This led them to consider it more suited for action games and the sophisticated graphical effects they were looking to create. The team implemented heavy visual effects in an exercise in design experimentation (not an effort to push the hardware). Some of that experimenting was done with the system's sprite rotation and scaling capabilities, which evoked a sense of depth. The Genesis had its limitations however, as it could only display 64 colors on-screen at once. The team placed extra effort on coloring to compensate. Early backgrounds were drawn with a 16 color palette, but they looked desolate, so ultimately two palettes with 32 colors were used. The team also used programming tricks to make the scenery appear like three to four layers were present, even though the Genesis only supports two.

The team approached Gunstar Heroes with an "anything goes" concept, that led to many ambitious ideas being implemented into the final game. One such concept was the weapon combination mechanic, which was conceived in the early planning stages. They experimented with weapon attributes until the end of development, and designed the game so players would continue discovering new weapons and devise unique ways to complete stages. The processor also made articulated multi-limb enemies possible, like the boss "Seven Force", which was programmed by Nami along with all other bosses. Since moving around large sprites was difficult due to limited video RAM, Seven Force was built by combining circles and squares to make one large character. Maegawa claims the game would not have worked on the Super NES because the boss animations required expanded computing power. The standard enemy characters, designed by Han, were drawn on the screen by combining a top and bottom sprite, allowing for more animation patterns with lower memory usage. Han was inspired by the game Mazin Saga: Mutant Fighter (1993) to program the enemies manually rather than with mathematical algorithms. The game was 16 megabits, but compressed to fit under 8.

== Release ==
Although McDonald's Treasure Land Adventure was completed beforehand, Treasure decided to wait and release Gunstar Heroes first because they wanted their debut to be an original game. It was nearly rejected for an American release by Sega of America, only being approved by Mac Senour, the last producer in the reviewing queue after 12 others rejected it. Senour believed the other producers dismissed the game because its small character sprites contrasted with the more popular large sprites at the time. Senour did ask Treasure to change one boss character because it looked too similar to Adolf Hitler.

Gunstar Heroes was released in Japan on September 10, 1993, and released in the West the same month. Sega underestimated demand in Japan where their initial shipment was only 10,000 units. Meanwhile, Sega of America also ordered a small initial print run, as they were not typically confident in games from Sega of Japan. The game was not heavily promoted and spread through speech. GameFan particularly enjoyed the game and published the first English interview with Maegawa. The game shipped around 70,000 copies in Japan, and 200,000 overseas. An arcade version was also released for the Sega Mega-Play arcade board.

=== Ports and re-releases ===
A modified version was released for Sega's Mega-Play arcade hardware in 1994. Changes include multiple lives being given per credit (as opposed to a single life in the console version), a 10-second timer which forces the player to make a decision when appropriate, and continuous play by inserting additional credits.

A Game Gear port was developed by M2. Sega asked M2 if they wanted to make a Game Gear game after being impressed by their Gauntlet port for the Genesis. M2 wanted to port The Cliffhanger: Edward Randy, but they were ultimately handed Gunstar Heroes. Since the Genesis version pushed hardware limitations, a Game Gear port was difficult. The port had some changes, such as the Dice Palace being removed, and it ran at lower frame rate. It was released on March 24, 1995.

Sega released Gunstar Heroes Treasure Box in 2006 in Japan, a compilation of Treasure games for the PlayStation 2 as part of their Sega Ages 2500 series. Included on the compilation were Gunstar Heroes, Dynamite Headdy (1994), and Alien Soldier (1995). The games are run through an emulator and include display options for filters and resolutions. The Japanese and international versions were included, along with the Game Gear ports of Gunstar Heroes and Dynamite Headdy, and a Genesis prototype of Gunstar Heroes. A gallery is included with scans of the original instruction manuals, concept illustrations, and design documents. The compilation was released digitally on the PlayStation Store in 2012.

The game was ported by M2 to the Nintendo 3DS in 2015 as part of Sega's line of 3D Classics. Gunstar Heroes was originally not considered for the series because converting the game's backgrounds into a layered 3D effect was thought to be impossible, but these perceived problems were later overcome. In addition to supporting stereoscopic 3D, the game features two new modes. "Gunslinger" mode starts the player with a full arsenal of every weapon type and grants the ability to change shot stance at any time. "Mega Life" mode starts the player with double the normal amount of health. The game also supports local cooperative play and includes both the Japanese and international versions.

Gunstar Heroes has also been released on the Xbox 360, PlayStation 3, Wii via Virtual Console, and Windows. A Sega Forever version for mobile devices was released in 2017. The game was again released via the Nintendo Classics service in 2021.

== Reception ==
Contemporary reception

Review scores
Publication	Score
Computer and Video Games	92%
Edge	6/10
Electronic Gaming Monthly	9/10, 9/10, 9/10, 9/10
Famitsu	Genesis: 8/10, 8/10, 7/10, 6/10; Game Gear: 6/10, 4/10, 6/10, 6/10
Game Informer	9.25/10
GamePro	18/20
Mean Machines Sega	93%
Sega Force	94%
Sega Magazine	94%

Awards
Publication	Award
GameFan Megawards	Game of the Year
MegaTech (1993)	Hyper Game Award

Gunstar Heroes achieved greater recognition than Treasure anticipated. Electronic Gaming Monthly called it their "Game of the Month", and the game placed first in Beep! Mega Drive's reader rankings in Japan. GameFan deemed it their "Game of the Year" and called it a new benchmark for action games. Mean Machines Sega wrote that Gunstar Heroes was setting a new standard for action games on the Genesis, calling it "a stunning title both in appearance and the gameplay it offers." Electronic Gaming Monthly agreed, with a critic calling it "one of the most intense games I've seen on the home video game scene." Both Sega Magazine and Sega Force felt the game was a must-buy for Genesis owners.

The game was commended for its fast and furious action. Electronic Gaming Monthly called it "one of the most intense carts to date [...] nonstop intensity from beginning to end." Mean Machines Sega agreed, praising the variety in level design and the "frantic, high-density blasting mayhem." Sega Force believed the game's variety prevented it from falling into monotony, and instead, reinvigorated the platform genre. Computer and Video Games agreed, feeling gameplay customization options kept it interesting and original. Some critics praised the player characters' acrobatics and attack maneuvers for adding excitement. GamePro called Gunstar Heroes "chaos in a cart" with "murderous action, excellent controls, and imaginative game design." The two-player cooperative mode was praised, though some felt there was too much clutter on the screen to tell the player characters apart.

The graphics were highlighted by several critics, with GamePro calling it "an assault on your senses." Mean Machines Sega felt the sprite rotating and scaling overshadowed the abilities of the Super NES. Sega Magazine also liked the sprite scaling, and highlighted its use on the boss "Seven Force". Other critics also felt the bosses were well animated and designed, with some extending their comments to the player characters' animations as well. Computer and Video Games commended the graphical explosion effects, with other critics praising the sound effects they were paired with for enhancing the game's atmosphere. A critic from Electronic Gaming Monthly called it "one of the best looking carts I've seen from Sega in a while."

=== Ports ===
Critics lauded the Game Gear port as a great 8-bit conversion. GameFan felt it was graphically advanced for a Game Gear game. Mean Machines Sega agreed, thinking that the graphics remained true to the 16-bit original despite greater system limitations. The 3DS version was praised for the added options and enhancements, with USgamer and Nintendo World Report calling it the best version of the game. The mobile version was criticized for being difficult to play with touch controls.

== Legacy ==
Gunstar Heroes was listed as one of the best games ever made by several publications. Critics have called it a "classic" of the 16-bit era, with IGN writing that its pace and speed was "nearly unrivaled" at the time. Others called it one of the best Genesis games. Electronic Gaming Monthly called it "one of the best two-player games ever made." USgamer wrote that its chaotic and brash nature made it the "quintessential classic-era Sega game" in contrast to the more gentle offerings from Nintendo. Nintendo World Report called it "an incredible accomplishment, both creatively and technically" for the Genesis. Both TouchArcade and GameSpy deemed it one of the best side-scrolling action games ever made.

Being Treasure's debut game, Gunstar Heroes helped establish their reputation in the industry. Retro Gamer said the game "blew open the state of 2D platform-shooters." Developers at the time borrowed inspiration for titles like Vectorman (1995) and Shinobi III: Return of the Ninja Master (1993). Treasure also started building a following of loyal hardcore fans, which USgamer felt was earned by "a sense of integrity to Treasure's work you don't often see in games of that era." 1UP.com wrote that between Gunstar Heroes and their other Genesis games, Treasure earned a reputation as a "master of hardcore action gaming." Many of the design conventions Treasure used in Gunstar Heroes would return and became characteristic of their later work, such as a quirky sense of humor and action taken to a level of absurdity. A sequel was released for the Game Boy Advance in 2005, Gunstar Super Heroes.
