= Silhouette Mirage =

1997 video game

- Developer: Treasure
- Publishers: JP: Entertainment Software Publishing; NA: Working Designs
- Director: Masaki Ukyo
- Producer: Kōichi Kimura
- Programmers: Masaki Ukyo; Mitsuru Yaida; Fukuryuu
- Artists: Naoki Kitagawa; Gō Nakazawa; Kiyotaka Ōhashi
- Composers: Katsuhiko Suzuki; Jun Irie; Hideki Matsutake
- Platforms: Sega Saturn, PlayStation
- Release: Sega Saturn: JP: September 11, 1997; PlayStation: JP: July 23, 1998; NA: January 5, 2000
- Genre: Action
- Mode: Single-player

Silhouette Mirage (Note: Shiruetto Mirāju (シルエットミラージュ) in Japan) is a 2D action side-scrolling video game developed by Treasure and released in 1997. The game's primary mechanic is the two opposing attributes, "Silhouette" and "Mirage" and the way they are able to cause damage to each other. Shyna features as the female protagonist who is able to switch between these attributes at will by facing either left or right on-screen. Secondary mechanics in the form of various melee moves are used to get enemies onto the correct side of the screen so that when Shyna is facing them, she is able to use the correct, opposing attribute to damage them.

It was first published by ESP for the Sega Saturn in 1997 in Japan. It was ported to the PlayStation in 1998. In 2000, Working Designs translated, made significant alterations to, and published the game for the PlayStation in North America. The game was well received by critics upon release. Critical reception to the changes in the North American version of the game was divided, with some praising the changes and others critical of them.

== Gameplay ==
Typical gameplay in the second level of Silhouette Mirage

Silhouette Mirage is an action side-scroller and features seven levels presented in a 2D view. The game's major mechanic is based around the concept of two opposing attributes, "Silhouette" and "Mirage". Enemies are either "Silhouette", which can only be destroyed using "Mirage" attacks or "Mirage" which can only be destroyed using "Silhouette" attacks". The protagonist Shyna automatically changes between these different forms when facing in a certain direction. When facing right she turns red and uses "Mirage" attacks and when facing left she turns blue and uses "Silhouette" attacks. Both Shyna and enemies have health, which is reduced by being hit with the opposite attribute attack, and "spirit" which is reduced by being hit with the same attribute attack. Spirit determines how much damage a weapon does. Since getting on the correct side of an enemy is an integral part of gameplay, Shyna is capable of grappling, throwing and sliding, all of which can be used to get an enemy on the correct side so they can be damaged with the corresponding (opposite) attribute attack. These melee attacks do not damage enemies. Some bosses are able to switch between "Silhouette" and "Mirage".

Shyna also has the ability to triple jump, crawl and dash. Crawling and dashing allows the player to run up walls and along ceilings which acts as both an evasive and defensive technique and also as a means to reach hidden or seemingly unreachable areas. Shyna is also armed with a reflector that allows her to bounce enemy projectiles back at them. Additional weapons/magic known as "parasites", such as "Surosa" (single shots), "Cavitas" (homing blasts) and "Grattoni" (a powerful laser) can be purchased with coins from the Hare Wares vendor at certain points in the game. A small number of coins are collected by killing enemies; however, more coins can be obtained by mugging them using a technique called "Cash Bash". In addition to being able to save progress, the game also uses a system of continues which was more common in arcade games or games from previous generations. The player only has a single life, but can continue up to nine times.

The game's difficulty was increased in the North American version, with weapon prices being increased, enemies causing more damage, and the player's spirit energy reducing as they use weapons. Due to this new spirit reduction feature, when Shyna reduces an enemy's spirit, she now also absorbs this spirit. Most of the initial options are also locked in this version, and can only be modified by completing the game's five paths, upon which a special bonus feature is also unlocked.

The games developers explained that they are meant to be played and completed in a single sitting.

== Story ==
The game is set on Earth in the year "2XXX" after a system known as Edo has catastrophically failed and caused the world's inhabitants to be genetically mutated into beings known as either "Silhouette" or "Mirage". The protagonist is named Shyna Nera Shyna, who is a creation that is activated by the computer system Gehena. Shyna's purpose is to track down and repair Edo to undo the damage that has been done and unite the two opposed types of beings that were created. Shyna learns that Edo experimented on and created a being called Armageddon who was both Silhouette and Mirage. Due to the polar nature of these attributes, Armageddon was split into two individual entities known as Medigo and Hal, respectively the Silhouette and Mirage leaders. Those that display both of the attributes are known as Proteans, and in addition to Armageddon, Shyna and Zohar are also such beings. Shyna battles through Silhouette and Mirage creatures, including Medigo, Hal and Zohar. She is eventually able to repair and reboot Edo. Gehena then notifies Shyna that all Silhouette and Mirage lifeforms will be located, identified, processed and returned to their original selves. Gehena estimates that this process will take 932,000 hours to complete.

== Development ==
Silhouette Mirage was developed by Japanese video game developer Treasure, who had previously developed games such as Mischief Makers and Gunstar Heroes. At the time the developer was shifting their focus to the Nintendo 64 and PlayStation, and announced that Silhouette Mirage would be their final game for the Sega Saturn. In actuality, Treasure would go on to make one further Saturn game, Radiant Silvergun. Producer Kōichi Kimura said that the goal of Treasure was to develop "fun games" and they pick the system that is best suited to the game rather than picking a system to develop for first.

According to director Masaki Ukyo, the original concept was to incorporate the idea of two different attributes to make a unique action game, and that other concepts such as grabbing, throwing and "Cash Bash" were added later in development simply because they felt they had many ideas that they liked and wanted to add them all. The gameplay mechanic of the player's power dropping if the spirit gauge falls was added near the end of development, and was based on a system Treasure used in Guardian Heroes (1996). The gameplay system was designed first and then the story and characters designed later. The character Shyna originally had a more typical fantasy witch design, but producer Kōichi Kimura did not feel comfortable with fantasy settings, so gave the setting and character a futuristic design. He decided to use chibi character designs because he was not skilled at drawing realistic characters.

In retrospect, producer Kimura questioned some of his gameplay decisions that potentially resulted in the view that the game was too complex or overwhelming, especially how he introduced players to the mechanics of the game. He said he felt he introduced too much of the various gameplay systems onto the player too fast at the beginning and that this was a mistake. He admitted that reception had not been great for the game, and that for those who didn't understand the game systems the game was perplexing.

Treasure re-used the dual attribute damage mechanic of Silhouette Mirage in their shoot 'em up game Ikaruga (2001). In Ikaruga, the concept of attributes is known as polarity which manifests as the player's ship being either black or white. Similarly with Silhouette Mirage, damage can only be done to the player or enemies by projectiles of the opposite attribute. While Shyna changes attributes by facing in different directions, the ship in Ikaruga changes attributes with a button press.

== Release ==
Silhouette Mirage was released in Japan on the Sega Saturn on September 11, 1997, and published by ESP. Sega, which had published Treasure's previous Saturn game, Guardian Heroes, expressed a lack of interest in releasing the game in the West.

The game was ported to the PlayStation as Silhouette Mirage: Reprogrammed Hope in Japan on July 23, 1998. Treasure handled the port completely in house with a small team, including the difficult adaption of the 2D view into the PlayStation format. For the PlayStation version, the soundtrack was trimmed with the training music being replaced and a few minor background elements were simplified or removed. The Reaper and Geluve bosses are exclusive to the PlayStation version. The game's story was also adjusted to accommodate these new characters, resulting in some more dialogue, a new battleground, and another ending. Several background and animations from the Saturn version were removed in the PlayStation version. This version was released as a PS one Classic on the Japanese PlayStation Network on August 25, 2010.

American publisher Working Designs localized the PlayStation version for North America and made further alterations. They increased the gameplay difficulty, and added vibration support and memory card selection. Working Designs discovered that the game used virtual controllers to control enemy bosses, and took advantage of this to make Zohar a fully playable character during the credits. Cutscenes were enhanced to run at a slightly higher resolution. There are also secrets such as a debug mode, more options, and "Super Core Fighter 2", a two player mini-game battle between Shyna and Zohar which Kenneth Innes developed in a single night. Also, the Hare Wares sprites were censored/edited. His cigarette was replaced with a gloved hand, and the burning cross was replaced with a dragon. A preview video for Lunar 2: Eternal Blue, another game localized by Working Designs, was also added to the game. Some character and location names that reference the Bible were also changed. The North American release was originally slated for release in the third quarter of 1998.

== Reception ==
Reception

Review scores
Publication	Score
Consoles +	85%
Edge	6 /10
Famitsu	7/10, 7/10, 7/10, 8/10
GameFan	283 /300
Joypad	8 /10
M! Games	73%
Next Generation	3/5
Sega Saturn Magazine (UK)	90%
Sega Saturn Magazine (JP)	8.3 /10

=== Sega Saturn ===
Upon release, Silhouette Mirage received positive reviews. Edge praised the game as being a "frantic, polished battle" and commented on the novel mechanics of the game, however they ultimately summarized that its major flaw was that it "degenerates into mindless button bashing". One reviewer in Famitsu stated that even the player just button mashed, it was still fun. Hamamura Tsūshin wrote in the magazine that its only downside was its plain appearance, but that the game was still full of good gameplay ideas.

Next Generation noted that the release of Silhouette Mirage showcased that Treasure was continuing to innovate within the bounds of an outdated video game genre. They called the game a success but also noted that Treasure's "tendency towards too much" and the unbalanced power-ups were substantial shortcomings.

=== PlayStation ===
Reception

Aggregate score
Aggregator	Score
Metacritic	69/100

Review scores
Publication	Score
Electronic Gaming Monthly	8/10
Game Informer	7.5/10
GameSpot	4.6/10
IGN	8.9/10
Joypad	5 /10
Mega Fun	15%
Next Generation	3/5
Official U.S. PlayStation Magazine	3.5/5
PlayStation: The Official Magazine	3/5
Video Games (DE)	75%
Dengeki PlayStation	75/100, 70/100
Gamers' Republic	A−, A, B

Critical opinion on the PlayStation version of the game was more divided. The PlayStation release received average reviews according to the review aggregation website Metacritic. German magazine Mega Fun reviewed the Japanese version of the game, saying the action is slow and battles are not fun. They also cited the graphics engine as being very poor.

Greg Orlando reviewed the game for Next Generation, and stated that "Befuddled baseball player Richie Ashburn once quipped, 'I don't know what it is, but I know I've never seen it before.' He might as well have said it while jamming away on the eminently quirky and playable Silhouette Mirage." IGN praised "revolutionary new play mechanics and an insane amount of depth" and said that "it does push the 2D power of the PS to the max".

GameSpot's review focused on the differences between the Saturn and PlayStation releases, mentioning the "inflated weapon cost" and the mechanic involving draining enemies' spirits, which they stated is "the biggest flaw in the game". They went as far as to recommend importing the original Saturn release because "a perfectly fun game is now an unrewarding chore overwrought with tedium". A reviewer in Gamers' Republic was critical of the new voice Shyna, in the American version, saying the original voice was much more expressive. In contrast, another reviewer in Gamers' Republic praised the North American version, specifically the translation of Working Designs, saying it is "amazingly religious" compared to the Sega Saturn version. Joypad was also highly negative about this version of the game.

=== Retrospective ===
In 2006, Game Informer magazine called the game a "deep, complicated side-scrolling shooter that will challenge the most skilled players and charm then with its strange story and colorful visuals". In 2007, Eurogamer remarked that the game has aged well due to it being a 2D game and consider the game a cult classic. Retro Gamer magazine noted the game had a tendency to confuse many players but had dedicated fans; and wrote that the game was a "unique 2D experience" for those who are willing to put the time into the game.

In 2015, a panel of writers by Dengeki Online listed the game as one of the masterpieces for the Sega Saturn with one writer saying it was their favorite game by Treasure for the system, above Guardian Heroes and Radiant Silvergun.
