= Masaki Ukyo =

Japanese video game designer and programmer

- Occupations: Video game designer and programmer

Masaki Ukyō (右京 雅生, Ukyō Masaki) is a Japanese video game designer and programmer at R.U.N (Release Universe Network) and a former Fill-in-Cafe and Treasure game designer. He joined Treasure from April 1993 to April 2004. He established the company R.U.N with former Fill-in-Cafe employee Masatoshi Imaizumi.

== Works ==
Director

- Guardian Heroes
- Silhouette Mirage

Game designer

- Code of Princess
- Bangai-O Spirits
- Mad Stalker: Full Metal Force (with Masatoshi Imaizumi)

Programmer

- Advance Guardian Heroes
- Mad Stalker: Full Metal Force (with Masatoshi Imaizumi)
- Phantom Breaker (with Masatoshi Imaizumi)
- Rakugaki Showtime
- Silhouette Mirage
- Silpheed: The Lost Planet
- Sin & Punishment: Star Successor
- Tiny Toon Adventures: Defenders of the Universe (Cancelled)
- Yū Yū Hakusho Makyō Tōitsusen

Graphic designer

- Mad Stalker: Full Metal Force (with Masatoshi Imaizumi)

Localization

- Silhouette Mirage
