= Tiny Toon Adventures: Buster's Bad Dream =

2002 video game

- Cover art
- Developer: Treasure Co. Ltd
- Publishers: EU: Swing! Entertainment; NA: Conspiracy Entertainment
- Directors: Pat-RASH; Mitsuru Yaida
- Programmer: Mitsuru Yaida
- Artists: Hisashi Fujita; Naoki Kitagawa
- Composer: Norio Hanzawa
- Platform: Game Boy Advance
- Release: EU: July 5, 2002; NA: 2002
- Genre: Beat 'em up
- Mode: Single-player

Tiny Toon Adventures: Buster's Bad Dream is the second Tiny Toon Adventures-related game released on the Nintendo Game Boy Advance. It was released on July 5, 2002, in Europe and was developed by Treasure Co. Ltd and published by Swing! Entertainment.

== Gameplay ==
Buster Bunny is having bad dreams and he aims to stop them. This game features a "partner system" that allows players to team up with other characters. The side-scrolling action features a unique take on fighting, allowing combos and more. The partners include:

- Babs Bunny
- Plucky Duck
- Hamton J. Pig
- Dizzy Devil
- Shirley the Loon
- Fifi La Fume
- Li'l Sneezer

== Legacy ==
In 2005, a North American version of the game began popping up on eBay and at small retailers, published by Treasure-regular Conspiracy Entertainment as Tiny Toon Adventures: Scary Dreams. Aside from the title screens and legal information, it was virtually unchanged from the European version of the game. According to information on the box, copies of the game appear to have been produced in 2002 and shelved between then and the time it surfaced. Only a few copies of this version made it to the market.

Another game (also developed by Treasure under the supervision of Hitmaker), Astro Boy: Omega Factor, used some gameplay ideas from this game, particularly regarding the way enemies could be knocked into each other.

Buster's Bad Dream is the last Tiny Toons game to be developed and published. The next game in the series, Tiny Toon Adventures: Defenders of the Universe, was to be released in 2002; it was cancelled despite its development being completed.
