= Advance Guardian Heroes =

2004 video game

- Developer: Treasure
- Publishers: JP: Treasure; WW: Ubisoft
- Director: Tetsuhiko Kikuchi
- Designers: Tetsuhiko Kikuchi; Naoki Kitagawa
- Programmers: Masaki Ukyo; Hiroto Matsuura; Katsuhiro Sanjo
- Artists: Tetsuhiko Kikuchi; Satoshi Tetsuka; Satoshi Nakai; Makoto Ogino
- Composer: Norio Hanzawa
- Platform: Game Boy Advance
- Release: NA: September 14, 2004; JP: September 22, 2004; AU: February 17, 2005; EU: February 18, 2005
- Genre: Beat 'em up
- Modes: Single-player, multiplayer

Advance Guardian Heroes (Note: Japanese: アドバンスガーディアンヒーローズ, Hepburn: Adobansu Gādian Hīrōzu) is a beat 'em up video game developed and published by Treasure for the Game Boy Advance. The game was released on September 22, 2004, in Japan, September 14 in North America and February 18, 2005, in Europe. It was released outside Japan by Ubisoft. It is a sequel to Guardian Heroes on the Sega Saturn and developed under license from Sega.

== Gameplay ==
Advance Guardian Heroes is a side-scrolling beat 'em up in which the playable characters can perform various attacks. Physical moves include countering and mid-air dashes. Magic attacks, which drain the MP meter, include element spells and protective barriers. It is also possible to go into "Hyper Mode", a faster, more powerful version of the playable character.

The game is separated in various stages and sub-stages with their own boss-fights, enemies, and puzzles. Gameplay modes include "Story" for up to two players, "Versus" and "Training".

Unlike its predecessor, Advance Guardian Heroes allows players to move smoothly towards and away from the screen, as opposed to switching between 3 planes. Some platforming elements have been added to break up the combat, and two new jumping manoeuvres, the air-dash and the homing jump, have been implemented. Some sequences in which these moves are used seem to be references to various 8-bit and arcade games, and some wire-fu films.

A large part of the game relies on a revised "barrier spell". All playable characters (and enemies on higher difficulty settings) have the barrier spell available, and at the cost of magic-over-time, it renders a character invincible. Properly timed use of the barrier spell allows a player to reflect projectiles and magic (in a visual effect reminiscent of Mischief Makers' Marina Liteyears throwing a laser or lightning bolt back at its source), or stun enemies who attack in melee.

A green gauge is used to represent the character's anger. At any point that the player's character is rendered immobile or out of the player's control, the player can rapidly press buttons to increase the anger gauge. Points allocated to the character's mobility grant bonuses to how quickly this gauge increases. When it flashes, the character can press A+B simultaneously to activate "Hyper Mode" or "Anger Mode", starting a timer in which the anger gauge decreases, the magic gauge increases, the character is given a burst of speed, and the player is returned control of the character.

If the player's character dies during the course of the game, a sinister figure appears and offers to give the character invincibility in exchange for the character's soul. If the player refuses, the princess appears and reassures the player that there will be another chance, before the game transitions to a game over screen. If the player agrees to the sinister figure's conditions, then the character is brought back to life in a state referred to as "Devil Mode" that is unable to take damage (although still able to be knocked down and flung around) for the next six minutes, before the sinister figure reappears and destroys the character, resulting in a game over screen. Regardless of the player's choice, the game may be continued from the last checkpoint reached before going into "Devil Mode".

Also, unlike the first game, the player is allowed to use almost every unlocked character in the main story as well as in the other modes.

Throughout the game, defeated enemies will drop crystals of varying sizes and colour, that act as the experience points. Between stages, players can allocate these crystals towards one or more of their character's attributes: Vitality, Mind, Attack, Defence, Magical Attack, Magical Defence, and Mobility. At certain points, the player has to fight the heroes of the previous game, and upon defeating them, they will give up their souls, which will increase one of attributes by 10. Increasing an attribute with soul crystals will raise the character's level, no matter how high that attribute was to begin with. The higher the character's level, the more soul crystals will be needed to reach the next level, so players have to allocate their points carefully. Anything left over after allocation, can be donated towards unlocking further playable characters.

== Plot ==
The story follows the events of Guardian Heroes. After the Undead Hero was returned to his rest, the heroes were given the option of becoming the Sky Spirit's perfect warriors. The group was divided, with Nicole, Serena, and Valgar joining the Sky Spirit, and Han and Genjiro refusing. Randy escaped back to earth on his own, leaving Han and Genjiro to fight a losing battle against their former comrades.

Years later, Zur returns. He resurrects Kanon and uses the power of the Guardian Heroes to take over the world. The few remaining resistance forces call upon the power of the Undead Hero once again, with one young soldier giving up his body to serve as its vessel.

Throughout the game, the character fights the previous heroes and earns their power. Ultimately, it is revealed this is another attempt by the heavens to create the ultimate warrior. In the final battle against the ruler of the heavens, all heroes gather to defeat it and subsequently leave for the Other World.

== Reception ==
Reception

Aggregate score
Aggregator	Score
Metacritic	65/100

Review scores
Publication	Score
Edge	6/10
Electronic Gaming Monthly	6.83/10
Game Informer	7/10
GameSpot	6.9/10
GameSpy	3.5/5
GameZone	6/10
IGN	6/10
Jeuxvideo.com	9/20
Nintendo Power	3.9/5
Nintendo World Report	7.5/10
X-Play	1/5

The game received mixed reviews in English-speaking countries according to the review aggregation website Metacritic. While most critics praised the visuals and the gameplay, they criticized the story and the game suffering from frame rate problems when run on emulators.
