= Kadokawa Shoten =

Japanese publishing company

- Logo used since 2013
- Native name: 角川書店
- Formerly: Kadokawa Shoten Publishing Co., Ltd. (2003-2013)
- Type: Division
- Industry: Publishing
- Founded: November 10, 1945; 81 years ago (brand); April 1, 2007; 19 years ago (Kadokawa Holdings subsidiary)
- Founder: Genyoshi Kadokawa
- Headquarters: Fujimi, Chiyoda, Tokyo, Japan
- Key people: Takeshi Natsuno (president and CEO)
- Products: Books, magazines
- Parent: Kadokawa

Kadokawa Shoten (角川書店), formerly the Kadokawa Shoten Publishing Co., Ltd. (株式会社角川書店, Kabushiki-gaisha Kadokawa Shoten), is a Japanese publisher and division of Kadokawa Corporation based in Tokyo, Japan. It became an internal division of Kadokawa Corporation on October 1, 2013. Kadokawa publishes manga, light novels, manga anthology magazines such as Monthly Asuka and Monthly Shōnen Ace, and entertainment magazines such as Newtype. Since its founding, Kadokawa has expanded into the multimedia sector, namely in video games (as Kadokawa Games) and in live-action and animated films (as Kadokawa Pictures).

== History ==
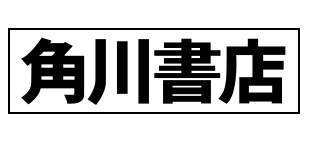
Logo used from 1945 to 2013

Kadokawa Shoten was established on November 10, 1945, by Genyoshi Kadokawa. The company's first publication imprint, Kadokawa Bunko, was published in 1949. The company went public on April 2, 1954. In 1975, Haruki Kadokawa became the president of Kadokawa Shoten, following Genyoshi Kadokawa's death. On April 1, 2003, Kadokawa Shoten was renamed to Kadokawa Holdings, transferring the existing publishing businesses to Kadokawa Shoten. On July 1, 2006, the parent company was renamed to Kadokawa Group Holdings and in January 2007, Kadokawa Group Holdings inherited the management and integration businesses within Kadokawa Shoten. The magazine businesses was transferred to the Kadokawa Magazine Group. The video game divisions of Kadokawa Shoten, ASCII Media Works and Enterbrain were merged into Kadokawa Games. Kadokawa Shoten ceased being a kabushiki gaisha on October 1, 2013, when it was merged with eight other companies to become a brand company of Kadokawa Corporation.

== Subsidiaries ==
- Kadokawa Haruki Corporation: Founded in 1976 Haruki Kadokawa as a film production company. The company was later merged into Kadokawa Shoten. When Haruki Kadokawa was still on bail following his 1993 arrest, Kadokawa Haruki Corporation was established by Haruki Kadokawa on September 12, 1995, as a publisher.
- Fujimi Shobo: In 1991, Fujimi Shobo was merged into Kadokawa Shoten, but continued operations as a division of Kadokawa Shoten.
- The Television: In 1993, it was merged into Kadokawa Shoten.
- Kadokawa Media Office: In 1993, it was merged into Kadokawa Shoten.
- Kadokawa J-com media
- Kadokawa Gakugei Shuppan Publishing: Formerly Hichō Kikaku, it was renamed on April 1, 2003.
- Kadokawa Digix
- Kids Net
- Asmik Ace Entertainment: In 2006, Sumitomo Corporation purchased the 27.6% common stock of Asmik Ace from Kadokawa Shoten, and distributed the 75.3% stock of Asmik Ace into a subsidiary of Sumitomo, leaving Kadokawa Shoten a 20% stake holder. In 2007, Kadokawa's stake of Asmik Ace was transferred to Kadokawa Group Holdings. In 2010, Sumitomo purchased the remaining 20% stake from Kadokawa Group Holdings.
- Cinema Paradise
- Taiwan Animate
- Chara Ani

== Magazines published ==
- Altima Ace (discontinued)
- Asuka
- Asuka Ciel
- Ciel Tres Tres
- Comp Ace
- Comptiq
- Emerald
- Gundam Ace
- Kerokero Ace (discontinued)
- Marukatsu Famicom (discontinued)
- Monthly Ace Next (discontinued)
- Monthly Shōnen Ace
- Newtype
- The Sneaker (discontinued)
- Young Ace

== Light novel imprints ==
- Kadokawa Beans Bunko

Female focused light novel imprint.

- Kadokawa Bunko CrossLove

An erotic light novel imprint that's aimed at women.

- Kadokawa Books

A web-novel focused light novel imprint which also took over many works from the Fujimi Shobo Novels imprint with works aimed at both a male and female audience. They often (though not always) include either a pink or a blue obi upon purchase denoting which audience a work is aimed at.

- Kadokawa Gin no Saji Series

The fantasy novel imprint which both children and adults can enjoy.

- Kadokawa Sneaker Bunko
- Kadokawa Ruby Bunko

Boys Love focused imprint.

- Kadokawa Tsubasa Bunko

Children's literature focused imprint.

== Manga titles published ==
- .hack//Legend of the Twilight
- Angelic Layer
- Baka and Test
- Basquash!
- Bio Booster Armor Guyver
- Black Rock Shooter
- Brain Powerd
- Bungou Stray Dogs
- Cardfight!! Vanguard
- Chrono Crusade
- Cloverfield/Kishin (prequel to movie)
- Cowboy Bebop
- Code Geass
- Cowboy Bebop: Shooting Star
- Deadman Wonderland
- Dragon Half
- Girls Bravo
- Escaflowne The movie: Girl In Gaya
- Escaflowne: The Series
- Eureka Seven
- Hakkenden
- Haruhi Suzumiya
- Highschool of the Dead
- Hybrid Child
- In Another World with My Smartphone
- Junjo Mistake
- Junjo Romantica: Pure Romance
- Kannazuki no Miko
- Kantai Collection
- Kemono Friends
- Kerberos Panzer Cop
- Konosuba
- Legal Drug
- Love Stage!!
- Lucky Star
- Ludwig II
- Maoyū Maō Yūsha
- Marionette Generation
- Martian Successor Nadesico
- Mirai Nikki
- Miyuki-chan in Wonderland
- Multiple Personality Detective Psycho
- Neon Genesis Evangelion
- Nichijou
- Prétear
- Re:Zero
- Record of Lodoss War
- Rental Magica
- Romeo × Juliet
- Sekai-ichi Hatsukoi (The World's Greatest First Love)
- Sewayaki Kitsune no Senko-san
- Sgt. Frog
- Shangri-La
- Shibuya Fifteen
- Shirahime-Syo: Snow Goddess Tales
- Slayers
- Sora no Otoshimono (Heaven's Lost Property)
- Steel Angel Kurumi
- Super Lovers
- Tenchi Muyo!
- The Kurosagi Corpse Delivery Service
- The One I Love
- The Summer Hikaru Died
- The Vision of Escaflowne
- Tokumei Kakarichō Tadano Hitoshi
- Toilet ga Hanako-san
- Shin Tokumei Kakarichō Tadano Hitoshi
- Tokyo ESP
- Trinity Blood
- X
- Yamada Taro Monogatari

== Video games published and developed ==
Published

- Abarenbō Princess
- Buile Baku (known in Europe as Detonator) (developed by KAZe)
- Lunar: Silver Star Story Complete
- Lunar 2: Eternal Blue Complete
- Sorcerous Stabber Orphen
- Yōkai Buster: Ruka no Daibōken (known in North America as The Jetsons: Invasion of the Planet Pirates) (Developed by Sting)
- Lodoss Tou Senki (Developed by HummingBirdSoft) (Super Famicom) 1995
- Hippa Linda (known in North America as Stretch Panic and Freak Out in Europe) (PlayStation 2) (Developed by Treasure Co., Ltd.) 2001
- Sora no Otoshimono Forte: Dreamy Season (Nintendo DS) 2011
- Steins;Gate (PlayStation Portable) 2011
- Lollipop Chainsaw
- Killer is Dead
- Rodea the Sky Soldier (Wii U) and (Nintendo 3DS)
- Mon Colle Knights GB (Game Boy Color) 2000

Developed

- EbiKore+ Amagami (PlayStation Portable)
- Earth Seeker
- Sora no Otoshimono Forte: Dreamy Season (Nintendo DS) 2011
- Kantai Collection (Former)
- Natural Doctrine
- Demon Gaze
- Killer is Dead (Microsoft Windows)
- Ring: Infinity (WonderSwan)

== See also ==
- ASCII Media Works
- Fujimi Shobo
- Light Novel Award
- Enterbrain
- Media Factory
