= Bangai-O =

1999 video game

- Nintendo 64 box art
- Developer: Treasure
- Publishers: JP: Entertainment Software Publishing; EU: Swing! Entertainment; NA: Conspiracy Entertainment
- Programmer: Mitsuru Yaida
- Platforms: Nintendo 64, Dreamcast
- Release: Nintendo 64: JP: September 3, 1999; Dreamcast: JP: December 9, 1999; EU: October 20, 2000; NA: March 21, 2001
- Genre: Shoot 'em up
- Mode: Single-player

Bangai-O (Note: Known in Japan as: Bakuretsu Muteki Bangaiō (爆裂無敵 バンガイオー; lit. "Explosive Invincible Bangaioh")) is a multidirectional shooter developed by Treasure and released in 1999 on the Nintendo 64 in Japan. It was ported to the Dreamcast worldwide shortly after with some gameplay changes and updated graphics and audio. The game places the player in control of a weaponized mech that can hover across large stages and fire at enemies all around them. The player must reach the end of each stage and defeat the boss, while avoiding hazards scattered across the map such as enemy mechs and gun turrets.

The initial ideas for Bangai-O came from Treasure programmer Mitsuru Yaida who wanted to challenge himself by programming an extreme number of bullets on the screen at once. Journalists agree that Yaida was most likely inspired by the 1984 Japanese computer game Hover Attack. The team developed the game with a focus on creating enjoyable gameplay, and opted for simple graphical effects to preserve the game's speed. Bangai-O was released on the Nintendo 64 and was limited to a run of 10,000 copies because of publisher Entertainment Software Publishing's belief it had niche appeal. The team replaced most of the graphics and audio, changed some gameplay elements, and re-released it on the Dreamcast three months later, a version later released internationally.

Bangai-O received positive reviews from game journalists. Many critics compared it to shoot 'em ups and action games of the past, praising its retro gameplay and aesthetics. They also commended the level design for keeping the game interesting throughout. Some reviews, especially those for the Dreamcast version, were more critical of the graphics and believed the game's value was primarily in its nostalgic gameplay. The game received two sequels: Bangai-O Spirits (2008) for the Nintendo DS and Bangai-O HD: Missile Fury (2011) for the Xbox 360.

== Gameplay ==
A player in the center hovers through a stage while avoiding enemy shots (Nintendo 64).

Bangai-O is a 2D side-scrolling multidirectional shooter. The player controls a weaponized mech that is piloted by the two main characters, Riki and his sister Mami. The story follows Riki and Mami in their efforts to stop criminals from smuggling fruit contraband to finance their evil deeds. The player can fly freely around each of the game's 44 stages, and must find and destroy the boss in each stage to advance. The mech can shoot in eight directions, and the type of ammo is dependent on which character is piloting. The two pilots can be interchanged instantaneously, Riki fires homing missiles and Mami shoots reflecting projectiles which bounce off walls. The stages are populated with destroyable buildings and obstacles, as well as some walls that are opened by switches. There are also hazards such as gun turrets and enemy mechs which fire projectiles at the player. The player has a health meter but no brief invulnerability period after being hit, so can die instantly if hit with a barrage of fire. Destroyed enemies and objects yield fruit which replenishes a meter that is used to power the "scatter bomb" attack. This attack can be charged to release up to 100 shots scattered in all directions at once. Hitting all 100 shots on enemies will open a small portal to a shop where the player can get upgrades such as improved shot damage.

The Dreamcast version of Bangai-O, released after the initial Nintendo 64 version, features significant differences in gameplay which results in a more streamlined experience. In the Dreamcast version, the bullets are stronger, and destroying objects and enemies refills the bomb attack meter instead of fruit which now only add to the player's score. The bomb attack also can no longer be charged to a specific number of missiles, but is dependent on the player's proximity to enemy projectiles. In the Dreamcast version, up to 400 missiles can be shot at once in comparison to 100 on the Nintendo 64. Also, the shop is removed. Instead, the game includes power-ups that can be found among environment wreckage. There are also other minor differences such as scoring differences and more structure and enemy types.

== Development ==
Hover Attack (1984) is believed to be the inspiration for Bangai-O.

The idea for Bangai-O came from Treasure employee Mitsuru Yaida (commonly known by the pseudonym "Yaiman"). He remembered playing an older shooting game that amazed him with the sheer number of bullets that could be rendered on the screen at once. Even though Yaiman and other staff behind the game have not identified the game, industry analysts agree that the game is almost certainly Hover Attack (1984) for Japanese computers. Yaiman began thinking about the programming challenges involved in detecting when the bullets collide with other objects, and started work on a prototype. He later received permission from company president Masato Maegawa to pull in other staff and work towards producing a full game. Yaiman served as the main programmer and "General Manager". About ten people worked on Bangai-O.

Treasure developed the game with a focus on creating addictive and fast gameplay, with less focus on graphics. They opted for large and fast 2D graphical effects and anime artwork to preserve their style. One of the artists on the team, Koichi Kimura, had just finished working on Guardian Heroes (1996), another 2D game. With more powerful development hardware available, he wanted to challenge himself the possibilities and limits of 2D graphics. The story is based on typical Japanese yakuza revenge plays.

== Release ==
Treasure announced Bangai-O for the Nintendo 64 in June 1999. It was released on September 3 the same year. Because of the game's niche appeal, the publisher Entertainment Software Publishing (ESP) only shipped 10,000 units.

The Dreamcast version was first released in Japan on December 9, 1999. This version had improved graphics and audio over the Nintendo 64 original. Many of the sprites were reworked, background animations were added, and the game now featured CD-quality music. By February 2000, publishers were researching the possibility of localizing the Dreamcast version for Western audiences. At the Electronic Entertainment Expo (E3) in May that year, it was reported that German publisher Swing! Entertainment had secured the rights to localize and market the game in Europe and North America. It would rename the title as Bangai-O from its obscure Japanese title, Bakuretsu Muteki Bangaioh, and announced that it would be released in the third quarter of 2000. IGN would later report at E3 that a publisher named Classified Games would publish the game in North America. In December, industry newcomer Conspiracy Entertainment announced they were localizing Bangai-O along with another Dreamcast game, Record of Lodoss War (2000). The Dreamcast version was planned for release on February 27, 2001, but was eventually released on March 21.

== Reception ==
Reception

Aggregate score
Aggregator	Score	
Aggregator	Dreamcast	N64
Metacritic	87/100	N/A

Review scores
Publication	Score	
Publication	Dreamcast	N64
Computer and Video Games	3/5	N/A
Electronic Gaming Monthly	7.5/10	N/A
Famitsu	27/40	30/40
GameFan	92%	92% (Note: In GameFan's viewpoint of the Nintendo 64 version's Japanese import, three critics gave it each a score of 93, 90, and 92.) (E.M.) 91% (R.M.) 89%
GameSpot	8.5/10	7.8/10
GameSpy	8.5/10	N/A
IGN	(JP) 9.3/10 (US) 9/10	7.8/10
N64 Magazine	N/A	84%
Next Generation	4/5	N/A
Nintendo Life	N/A	8/10
Dreamcast Magazine (UK)	65%	N/A
Dreamcast Magazine (JP)	8.3/10 (Note: Average of three reviews: 7, 9, and 9.)	N/A

Bangai-O received positive reviews for its initial Nintendo 64 release. Critics enjoyed the manic and unique gameplay that they believed was characteristic of Treasure's video games. Most compared it to older shoot 'em ups and action games. Eric Mylonas of GameFan called it a mix between the free-floating gameplay of Sub-Terrania (1994) and the rotating shooting action of Omega Boost (1999). He appreciated it as one of the few shooters on the Nintendo 64, and compared its aesthetic missile shooting style to Macross. Peter Bartholow (GameSpot) wrote that the game was "in typical Treasure fashion...an addictive and original hodgepodge of genres and game mechanics that defy easy explanation". Journalists commended the variety in the game's design that kept it feeling fresh throughout. Anoop Gantayat (IGN) wrote that the level design made good use of each character's shooting mode. Bartholow and Martin Kitts (N64 Magazine) both praised the level design for forcing the player to change their tactics level to level. Bartholow called the building elements for the levels "versatile", and went on to say some levels were puzzles, others had racing aspects, and others were "insane blastfests". Gantayat argued that Bangai-O is "a game that you either love, or just don't understand yet".

Bangai-O was praised for its retro gameplay and aesthetics. Kitts and Mylonas wrote that it looked and played like a Super NES game and pointed out how some effects were reminiscent of the 16-bit system's Mode 7 rotation effects. Mylonas explained further that it looked like a Super NES game with less slowdown, a higher resolution, and more color. Rick Mears (GameFan) wrote that it felt like Robotron (1982) with its unique control style, and called it an "old school 2D treat". Although the game was not in 3D like most other games at the time, critics felt the 2D graphics were satisfactory enough. Gantayat pointed out the scatter bomb attack that fills the screen with bullets "a momentous occasion...one of the main parts of the Bangai-O experience". Mears praised the game for not slowing down when rendering scenes like this.

Reviews for the Dreamcast version carried the same sentiments as the Nintendo 64 version in regards to the frantic and unique gameplay. Gantayat (IGN) and Matt van Stone (GameFan) preferred this new version because of the updated graphics, new CD-quality soundtrack, and more streamlined gameplay. With this release, journalists were more critical of the graphics and audio, commenting more heavily on the game's appeal primarily as a nostalgic shooter. The staff at Computer and Video Games wrote that it was a fun in a nostalgic way, but will not hold a player's attention for very long. A critic of PlanetDreamcast wrote that the graphics were bland and lacked polish, and the focus was on the gameplay. They argued that Bangai-O is a game designed for "hardcore" gamers and commented: "Are games coming out today missing something from the glory days of twitch gameplay...Or am I just too jaded by the 3-D graphics, complex mission objectives, and controls of most modern games[?]" In a brief but critical review, Dreamcast Magazine UK argued that it was a nearly direct port of the Nintendo 64 version, and called it "unimaginative". Human Tornado of GamePro said, "This well-designed 2D shooter will satisfy fans of old-school arcade ation games, but Bangai-O doesn't break any new ground. Still, it's a very challenging game that action gamers can groove to." (Note: GamePro gave the Dreamcast version three 3/5 scores for graphics, sound, and fun factor, and 4/5 for control.)

Despite never having been reviewed, the Dreamcast version was nominated at The Electric Playground's 2001 Blister Awards for "Best Console Shooter Game", but lost to Halo: Combat Evolved.

== Legacy ==
Bangai-O received two sequels. The first, Bangai-O Spirits, was released for the Nintendo DS in 2008, and the second, Bangai-O HD: Missile Fury, was released exclusively on the Xbox 360 via Xbox Live Arcade in 2011. The games feature most of the same core gameplay ideas as the first game, but evolve on them with more weapons and gameplay elements. Both games included level editors, and the latter features multiplayer modes.

In February 2026, two independent groups released separate fan translations of the Nintendo 64 version. Both feature original translations not based on that of the Dreamcast version.
