= Gun Beat =

Unreleased arcade video game

- Teaser flyer
- Developer: Treasure
- Artist: Kiyotaka Ohashi
- Composer: Norio Hanzawa
- Platform: Arcade
- Release: Canceled
- Genres: Racing, action
- Modes: Single-player, multiplayer
- Arcade system: Sega NAOMI

Gun Beat (Note: In Japanese: Gan Bīto (ガンビート)) is an unreleased action-racing video game previously under development by Treasure for the Sega NAOMI arcade platform. The game was revealed in February 1999 at an arcade trade show in Japan alongside several other games to promote Sega's new arcade board. Gun Beat was not playable, but a gameplay video was on display. The demo reel was well received by critics who felt the game carried the same quirky characteristics and quality artwork of previous Treasure offerings. Development on the game was ceased indefinitely in May 2000 with little explanation.

Treasure hatched the initial idea for Gun Beat when the NAOMI arcade board was revealed. The team looked to Wacky Races for inspiration to develop a disjointed and slapstick action-racing game. The game features players racing against each other while also having the ability to fire shots capable of slowing down rival players and destroying traps and enemies littered across the race course. It supports up to four players competing across locally connected cabinets.

== Gameplay ==
Cunyanya racing through a stage

Gun Beat was billed as an "action-racing" game for arcades. The goal of the game is to complete a race while destroying enemies and obstacles on the course. There are three modes: a single-player race, a score attack mode, and a versus mode. In the versus mode, up to four players can compete across four arcade cabinets linked locally to each other. Each player can choose one of four characters: Carmine, Mirabelle, Squad-Man, and Cunyanya. Carmine drives a hover bike, Mirabelle rides a witch's broom, Squad-Man is a biped robot that can fly and run, and Cunyanya is a young boy riding atop a giant Siberian flying squirrel. Each character can only be picked by one player, and each has its own unique characteristics such as handling, shot power, size, etc. Only three stage concepts were ever shown: a city, a snowy mountain, and ancient ruins.

Player can use various shot types to destroy enemies and traps obstructing the course, and slow down rival players. There are also power-ups on the courses. Other than the standard shot there is also a Magical Shot and the Beat Gun. The Magical Shot fires many projectiles at a wide range, and the Beat Gun is short range but powerful and can destroy enemies and obstacles unaffected by standard bullets. There is also a Magical Turbo gauge that when filled up, can boost the player through the course for five seconds, destroying any enemies or obstacles in their path. The gauge increases if the player hits an enemy, but decreases if they are hit themselves. Attacks become more powerful as a race goes on, so it is very possible for players to overtake each other towards the end of the race. Some of the enemies are larger and treated more like bosses. All enemy models are segmented into different appendages, with one segment being the "core". If an enemy's core is destroyed, the whole enemy is defeated, and the player gets a bonus based on how many other segments were remaining. Shots can be chained into combos for bonus points as well. In addition, players earn bonuses based on their rank and remaining time at the end of race, and also how many obstacles they destroyed. Each course has checkpoints that extend the player's remaining time if passed. If time runs out, it is game over.

== History ==
=== Development ===
Gun Beat was to be Treasure's second arcade game after Radiant Silvergun (1998) and their first for the Sega NAOMI arcade board. The idea for the game came when the NAOMI board was unveiled. Their idea could not be realized with current hardware, so the NAOMI board arrived at an opportune time. Sega's new arcade board allowed them to develop the race tracks as they envisioned them, with four player models along with enemies moving smoothly across a fully polygonal race track. The initial concept was to make a disjointed and slapstick racing game in the likeness of Wacky Races. They also held a concept from the beginning to make it unlike previous Treasure games. Once they established the racing elements, they added action, which at first was only punching and kicking. A programmer then thought of using shooting mechanics instead.

Music was being composed by Norio Hanzawa, who had written music for some of Treasure's previous games. The characters and artwork were designed by staff artist Kiyotaka Ohashi. The team decided on four characters because any more would cause frame rate slowdown, and any less was deemed too lonely. The characters were designed to appear from different works, wearing different clothes and using different vehicles. The character Carmine was designed as an ideal Treasure hero, a stark contrast from the other more fantastical characters. Mirabelle was given a long skirt because they felt a short skirt would appear too shameless. Squad-Man's design was based on "Treasure Man", a character that appeared in Mega Drive Magazine comics.

=== Promotion ===
This video of Gun Beat was captured at the AOU trade show by Japanese arcade gaming site Amusement Graffiti. It is the only known footage of the game.

Gun Beat was revealed on 17 February 1999 at the AOU (Arcade Operators Union) Amusement Expo at the Makuhari Messe convention center in Tokyo. It was not playable at the trade show, but a gameplay video could be seen at one of Sega's booths. Sega was demonstrating it alongside several other games to promote their NAOMI arcade board including Crazy Taxi (1999), Zombie Revenge (1999), and F355 Challenge (1999) among others. The game was only 10% complete at the time, and no release date was revealed. Treasure did not confirm whether a Dreamcast port was in development or not, but with the track record of NAOMI games commonly being ported to the Dreamcast, critics expected Gun Beat to follow in kind.

Critics shared their thoughts based on the gameplay video shown at the 1999 AOU trade event. IGN wrote that it looked "brilliant", and described it as "bizarre" and "very silly". They compared the gameplay to Bomberman Fantasy Race (1998), but believed Gun Beat would surpass it with better graphics, larger characters, faster speed, and quirky qualities characteristic of Treasure. They compared the flashy explosion effects to the Virtual On series. French publication Consoles + felt the game held testament to Treasure's ability in developing intense and original action titles. Chris Johnston of GameSpot advised readers to not write off the game as "cartoony" like Pen Pen TriIcelon (1998), but a more mature game with high quality Treasure artwork. Gamers' Republic believed the game showed promise.

=== Cancellation ===
In May 2000, Treasure announced they had ceased development of Gun Beat indefinitely until "conditions are satisfactory". The announcement was posted on their website along with a notice asking fans to look forward to another project they were still developing and had yet announced. The cancellation did not come as a surprise to IGN. According to GameSpot, the lead producer of the game had left Treasure a few months previously. They suspected his absence had placed a damper on the project.
