= Gaist Crusher =

Video game for the Nintendo 3DS

- Cover artwork of the video game

ガイストクラッシャー (Gaisutokurasshā)
- Genre: Action
- Manga
- Written by: Yasuki Tanaka
- Published by: Shueisha
- Magazine: V Jump, Saikyō Jump
- Original run: 2013 – 2015
- Volumes: 4
- Video game
- Developer: Treasure
- Publisher: Capcom
- Music by: Norio Hanzawa
- Genre: Action
- Platform: Nintendo 3DS
- Released: JP: December 5, 2013
- Manga

Gaist Crusher First
- Written by: Yasuki Tanaka
- Published by: Shueisha
- Magazine: V Jump, Saikyō Jump
- Published: 2013
- Anime television series
- Directed by: Yoshihiro Takamoto
- Written by: Satoru Nishizono
- Music by: Kohei Tanaka; Takayuki Negishi
- Studio: Pierrot
- Licensed by: SEA: Turner Asia
- Original network: TXN (TV Tokyo)
- English network: IN: Toonami; SEA: Toonami
- Original run: October 2, 2013 – October 1, 2014
- Episodes: 51
- Video game

Gaist Crusher God
- Developer: Treasure
- Publisher: Capcom
- Music by: Norio Hanzawa
- Genre: Action
- Platform: Nintendo 3DS
- Released: JP: September 4, 2014

Gaist Crusher (ガイストクラッシャー, Gaisutokurasshā) is an action video game developed by Treasure and published by Capcom. It was released for the Nintendo 3DS on December 5, 2013, in Japan. The game launched as a part of a cross-media franchise including manga adaptations in Shueisha magazines and an anime television adaptation by Pierrot.

A sequel, entitled Gaist Crusher God (ガイストクラッシャーゴッド, Gaisutokurasshā Goddo), was released in Japan on September 4, 2014, and features the original story from the first game as well as another "God" story, refined mechanics and more enemies. It is also the final video game developed by Treasure before the company went on hiatus shortly after its release.

== Story ==
=== Gaist Crusher ===
In the year 2047, mankind discovered a rare metal ore called "Gaimetal", which possessed a huge amount of energy, and mining for these strange metal ore begins all over the world. However, in 2064, humankind were constantly attacked by Gaist, a race of metallic creatures whose bodies were encrusted with Gaimetal, thus forming the GCG (also known as "Gaist Crusher Garrison"), an organization tasked with dealing against the Gaist. In 2075, the GCG send out mankind's line of defense: the Gaist Crushers, humans who can wear a special Gaimetal armor called "Gaist Gear", and battle the Gaist, as well as the threat opposed by a mysterious organization called "Erasers".

=== Gaist Crusher God ===
A few months after their victory against Erasers, Rekka Shirogane and the other Gaist Crushers are faced with a new threat from the ultimate Gaist, called God Gaist (ゴッドガイスト, Goddo Gaisuto), led by the powerful God Hinokagutsuchi, who plans to cleanse Earth of its "impurity", which was blamed on the human race. Once again, this leaves the task to Rekka and his allies to defeat them, with the help of a sentient Gaist named Maikuma (マイクマ, Maikuma), as well as going up against Cypher (the only member of the Erasers who survived), who plans to use the "ultimate Gaimetal" for his nefarious use.

== Gameplay ==
The gameplay is fairly similar to Lord of Arcana, with most of its combat mechanics bears similar to the God Eater series, although it usually focuses on combos and techniques. Players must explore the mission map, battling Gaist along the way. At the end of the map, a larger Gaist will appear, which the player must defeat to complete a mission. Players can make use of various attacks, as well as using "Gaist Arts" and "Form Changes". When defeating the Gaist, a special "Crush Chance" will appear, in which the player must destroy Gaist's core (which is surrounded with Gaimetal) within a given period of time, rewarding them with a new Gaist Gear once completed.

In combat, players can change the form of their Gaist Gear to adapt in the battlefield. There are three forms:

- Melee form: The player's default form, usually used in frontal attacks.
- Weapon form: The Armor Form's alternate form. The Weapon Form works similarly to Armor Form, though its appearance and function vary for each Gaist Gear equipped.
- Extreme form: A form that can be temporarily activate for a short period of time. In this form, a character will be transformed into a Gaist closest to the Gaist Crusher's Gaist Gear, thus gaining invincibility and more attack power.

Gaist Arts are special attacks that can be use against the Gaist. It was available for the Armor Form and Weapon Form. Each Gaist Art varies, depends on the form used, or on the Gaist Gear equipped. Most of the Gaist Arts can capable of paralyzing nearby enemies.

== Terminology ==
=== Gaimetal ===
A mysterious metallic ore discovered 50,000 meters (160,000 feet) beneath the ground 15 years from the main story. Although appeared to be metallic in nature, Gaimetals (ガイメタル) are capable of rapid crystallization, and it can also alters a genetic make-up of an organism. There are two different kinds of Gaimetal:

- The Jewel-type Gaimetals are gem-like Gaimetals where Gaist were usually sealed in, and most of this kind of Gaimetal were used by the Gaist Crushers.
- The Structural-type Gaimetal are Gaimetal that look like a chunk of crystallized rock, and it was usually used for building large structural objects, such as large ruins.

On occasions, an unpurified Gaimetal can be unstable and unpredictable, forcefully transforming a living organism into Gaist much faster. Fortunately, Gaimetals can be purified through various tampering techniques.

=== Gaist ===
A race of metallic lifeforms that are made entirely of Gaimetal, usually "born" when a Gaimetal is given a certain stimulus. Named after motifs from mythical cultures and legends, each Gaist differ in elemental attributes, appearance and abilities. It was said to be born from Gaimetals, as certain devices can accelerate a Gaist's "hyper-activation"(or in other words, awakening). Most of the Gaist are capable of intelligence, such as the God Gaists (ゴッドガイスト), which has immerse intelligence about everything in the universe.

=== Crush Chance (クラッシュチャンス) ===
When a Gaist's certain body part cracks, and crystals sprout out of it, a Crush Chance (クラッシュチャンス) occur, giving the Gaist Crushers the opportunity to destroy its "crush metal" to defeat and restore them into their Gaimetal form.

=== Gaist Crusher Garrison (ガイストクラッシャーギャリソン) ===
Usually referred to "GCG", the Gaist Crusher Garrison (ガイストクラッシャーギャリソン) is a worldwide-sanctioned organization whose main mission is to analyse, research, and even subdue any Gaist around the globe.

=== Gaist Crushers ===
A term referring to those who can equipped themselves with a special armor called "Gaist Gear". The Gaist Crushers usually works under the Gaist Crusher Garrison, selected for their respective specialties, such as combat, tactical strategies, and such. Rekka Shirogane was an "exception" to this, since he was accepted due to his very strong determination.

=== Gaist Phone ===
A portable device usually used by the Gaist Crushers and most of the Gaist Crusher Garrison's personnel. Resembling a small touch-screen phone, it has many functions, differs for each personnel. The "GC Model" Gai Phone was only available for the Gaist Crushers, and it has a special function called "Gaist On!" (ガイストオン). However, it requires inserting a Gaimetal on the Gai Phone, and the user must have an "aura" that can release enough Gaivolts (ガイ・ボルト) to activate it.

=== Gaist Gear ===
A special kind of armor made entirely of Gaimetal. The Gaist Gear can be equipped by the Gaist Crushers via a special command, called "Gaist On". The armor gave its user enhanced abilities, and get stronger the more determined the user was. The Gaist Gear has three forms:

- Melee Form (メールフォーム): This form protects its user from any physical damage done by the Gaist.
- Weapon Form (ウェポンフォーム): This form takes shape of a weapon for the Gaist Crusher to use.
- Extreme Form (エクストリームフォーム): The most dangerous form of the Gaist Gear. Upon activation, the user will be covered in crystalline Gaimetal, and transforms into a Gaist from the inside. According to Hayato Kongōji, the Extreme Form is the hardest form to control, requiring 100,000 Gaivolts to activate it, and therefore, very dangerous. According to him, it can traumatize its user, usually capable of straining their body, and in one case, unable to revert into human form.

== Characters ==
=== Gaist Crushers ===
A group of humans who can equip a special armor called "Gaist Gear".

Rekka Shirogane (白銀レッカ, Shirogane Rekka)
Voiced by: Daiki Yamashita
Gaist Gear: Flame Fenrir -> Bakuen Fenrion -> Exceed Fenrir
Weapon Attribute: Sword
Element Attribute: Fire
Hayato Kongōji (金剛寺ハヤト, Kongōji Hayato)
Voiced by: Yūichi Iguchi
Gaist Gear: Wind Garuda -> Storm Garudia -> Glory Garuda
Weapon Attribute: Scythe
Element Attribute: Wind
Kurama Shindō (真銅クラマ, Shindō Kurama)
Voiced by: Yasuyuki Takase
Gaist Gear: Gaia Orochi -> Geo Orojiarg -> Shinobi Oroshi
Weapon Attribute: Claw
Element Attribute: Gaia
Shiren Quartzheart (シレン・クォーツハート, Ku~ōtsuhāto Shiren)
Voiced by: Makoto Furukawa
Gaist Gear: Blizzard Unicorn -> Mirage Unicornia -> Crystal Unicorn
Weapon Attribute: Bow
Element Attribute: Ice
Izuna Kokuyou (黒曜 イズナ, Kokuyou Izuna)
Voiced by: Yoshitsugu Matsuoka
Gaist Gear: Lightning Dragoon -> Plasma Drageizer -> Blitz Dragoon
Weapon Attribute: Spear
Element Attribute: Thunder

=== Gaist Crusher Garrison ===
The organization where the Gaist Crushers were working with, whose sole purpose is to research and, if possible, eliminate the Gaist.

Sango Sakura (桜さんご, Sakura Sango)
Voiced by: Risa Taneda
Rock Volcan (ロック・ボルカン, Rokku Borukan)
Voiced by: Katsuyuki Konishi
Zeke Bana (ジーク・バナ, Jiiku Bana)
Voiced by: Tsuguo Mogami
Kohaku Kongōji (金剛寺コハク, Kongōji Kohaku)
Voiced by: Asami Tano
Luminella Hotaru (蛍ルミネラ, Hotaru Ruminera)
Voiced by: Ayahi Takagaki
Magnus (マグネス, Magunesu)
Voiced by: Kentaro Tone
Hisui Midori (緑ヒスイ, Midori Hisui)
Voiced by: Sora Amamiya

=== Erasers (イレイザー) ===
The mysterious organization who wreak havoc using Gaist, and plots to take over Earth.

Cypher (サイファ, Seifa)
Voiced by: Kenichi Suzumura
Mangan (マンガン, Mangan)
Voiced by: Yūsaku Yara
Rounder (ラウンダ, Rounder)
Voiced by: Mitsuishi Kotono
Alumni (アルーミ, Arumi)
Voiced by: Yao Kazuki
Ω (Ω（オメガ）, Omega)
Voiced by: Ishizuka Unsho

=== Other characters ===
Gōka Shirogane (白銀ゴウカ, Shirogane Gōka)
Voiced by: Shinya Fukumatsu
Hinoko Shirogane (白銀ひのこ, Shirogane Hinoko)
Voiced by: Kikuko Inoue
Rin Shirogane (白銀リン, Shirogane Rin)
Voiced by: Megumi Han
Gus Tennen (天念ガス, Tennen Gasu)
Voiced by: Daichi Nomura
Ken Nitta (新田ケン, Nitta Ken)
Voiced by: Ai Terashima

== Development ==
The game was announced in April 2013 as a cross-media campaign with a Nintendo 3DS "Custom Armor Action" game as the core. The goal was to market the game to elementary school age boys primarily using partnerships with Shueisha, Bandai and Pierrot including manga, toys and an anime. The initial planned launch window was Winter 2013.

In December 2013, it was confirmed that renowned manga artists Akira Toriyama and Eiichiro Oda each designed a Gaist enemy and Gaist Gear for the game. This was part of a collaboration with Shueisha's V Jump and Saikyō Jump magazines.

=== Localization ===
As of August 2013, Capcom announced they have no plans to localise the title for other regions.
