= Sin & Punishment: Star Successor =

2009 video game

- North American box art
- Developer: Treasure
- Publisher: Nintendo
- Director: Atsutomo Nakagawa
- Producers: Masato Maegawa; Hitoshi Yamagami
- Designer: Masaki Ukyo
- Artist: Yasushi Suzuki
- Composer: Norio Hanzawa
- Platform: Wii
- Release: JP: October 29, 2009; EU: May 7, 2010; NA: June 27, 2010
- Genre: Rail shooter
- Modes: Single-player, multiplayer

Sin & Punishment: Star Successor, released in Europe as Sin and Punishment: Successor of the Skies, and in Japan as Sin and Punishment: Sora no Kōkeisha (罪と罰 ～宇宙の後継者～, Tsumi to Batsu: Sora no Kōkeisha; Sin and Punishment: Successor of the Universe), is a 2009 rail shooter video game for Wii developed by Treasure and published by Nintendo. It is the sequel to the Nintendo 64 video game Sin and Punishment.

Set many years after the first game, Star Successor focuses on Isa Jo, the son of Saki and Airan from the first game, and a mysterious young woman named Kachi. The game is compatible with Nintendo Wi-Fi Connection, featuring online leaderboards. While the original game featured English voice acting in both the Japanese and English versions, the sequel has Japanese voice acting for the Japanese version, as well as the option to switch between Japanese and English voice acting in the non-Japanese versions.

Revealed at a Nintendo conference on October 2, 2008, it was released in Japan on October 29, 2009, in Europe on May 7, 2010, and in North America on June 27. Although Nintendo Australia never released the game physically, retailer JB Hi-Fi imported the UK version and began selling it on July 21.

The game was released for download through the Wii U's Nintendo eShop, in Japan on March 25, 2015, in Europe on April 30, in Australia and New Zealand on May 1 and in North America on August 27, along with the original game on the Wii U Virtual Console.

== Gameplay ==
The game can be controlled using one of four control methods: Wii Remote with Nunchuk, Wii Zapper, Classic Controller (as well as the Classic Controller Pro) and the Nintendo GameCube Controller. Playing as either Isa or Kachi, the player can move around freely on-screen, while traveling a set path (i.e. "on-rails") that may go forward, backward, side-to-side, or up and down - in a manner highly reminiscent of Space Harrier. The player may run on the ground and jump, as in the original, but can also fly. A rolling dodge move can be performed in any direction to avoid enemy attacks. Aiming of the gun is done with a reticule, and is not tied to movement.

In addition to gunfire, the player may also slash with a sword, which deals heavy damage to enemies at close range, and can be used to deflect certain projectiles (usually missiles) at an on-screen opponent, scoring heavy damage. A charge attack can be employed to deal very heavy damage, but requires a long cooldown period to recharge afterward.

Getting successive enemy hits while remaining unscathed increases the score multiplier, knocking enemy missiles, or alike, also increases the score multiplier.

== Plot ==
Taking place many years after the original Sin and Punishment, Star Successor reveals that there are two dimensions present within the universe: Inner Space and Outer Space. The leaders of Inner Space, known as the Creators, created and cultivated several Earths populated by humans to defend against Outer Space. Whenever humans stray from their intended path by attempting to bring peace, the Creators wipe them out and create a new Earth. Outer Space sends a reconnaissance unit in the form of a human girl to investigate humans. However, in the process of infiltration she loses her memory and wanders to the ruins of Earth-4 instead of the human-populated Earth-5. An agent of Earth-5, Isa Jo, is sent to find and kill the Outer Space infiltrator, but after observing her he concludes she is harmless. Naming her "Kachi," Isa decides to protect her. In response, the Creators send out a group known as the Nebulox, led by Isa's former ally Deko, to tell Isa that Kachi is a monster capable of destroying entire worlds, and that he must destroy her. When Isa refuses, they try to kill both Kachi and Isa for his betrayal. The "Keepers," lifeforms which have worked to destroy any supposed contaminants to Earth-4, attack humans and invaders.

Isa goes on the run with Kachi, seeking to board an air ship that will take them off the planet. Isa and Kachi's attempts to escape are thwarted by the Nebulox until they eventually decide to face them head on. Isa changes into a ruffian form, an ability he inherited from his father, Saki of the original Sin and Punishment, but he merges with Kachi in order to control his new power. They pursue the Nebulox into space, killing them one by one.

When the game is completed in Isa and Kachi mode, a final scene shows Kachi's memory returning. She reveals to Isa that her real name is Achi, revealing that she is actually the villain from the original Sin and Punishment, and that Isa's decision to protect her from the Nebulox was a mistake after all.

== Reception ==
Reception

Aggregate scores
| Aggregator | Score |
|---|---|
| GameRankings | 85.86% |
| Metacritic | 87/100 |

Review scores
| Publication | Score |
|---|---|
| 1Up.com | A |
| Destructoid | 8.5/10 |
| Edge | 8/10 |
| Eurogamer | 9/10 |
| Famitsu | 8/10, 8/10, 8/10, 7/10 |
| G4 | 4/5 |
| Game Informer | 8.75/10 |
| GamePro | 4.5/5 |
| GameRevolution | B+ |
| GameSpot | 8.5/10 |
| GamesRadar+ | 4/5 |
| IGN | 9/10; 9.2/10 (UK) |
| Joystiq | 5/5 |
| Nintendo Life | 9/10 |
| Nintendo Power | 9/10 |
| Nintendo World Report | 9/10 |
| Official Nintendo Magazine | 90% |
| PALGN | 9/10 |
| Nintendo Acción | 91/100 |

The game has received critical acclaim, holding a score of 87/100 on Metacritic, and 85.86% on GameRankings. IGN UK praised it, giving it a 9.2 out of 10, and writing: "Forget bullet hell - Treasure has created an awesome slice of bullet heaven". IGN US gave it a 9/10 and an Editor's Choice award, writing: "Playing Sin and Punishment: Star Successor is like diving into an action movie full of amazing sights and tense gunfights".

== See also ==
- List of Wii games
