= Rakugaki Showtime =

1999 video game

- Cover art of the game, that was released in Japan
- Developer: Treasure
- Publisher: Enix
- Director: Tetsuhiko Kikuchi
- Designers: Naoki Kitagawa; Tetsuhiko Kikuchi; Tsunehisa Kanagae
- Programmers: Hiroshi Matsumoto; Masaki Ukyo
- Artists: Gō Nakazawa; Kazuo Yasuda
- Composers: Norio Hanzawa; Toshiya Yamanaka; Kanta Watanabe
- Platform: PlayStation
- Release: JP: 29 July 1999
- Genre: Fighting
- Modes: Single-player, multiplayer

Rakugaki Showtime (Note: Japanese: ラクガキショータイム; lit. "Doodle Showtime") is a 1999 fighting game for the PlayStation developed by Treasure and published by Enix. It is a full 3D battle arena fighting game, featuring characters that resemble crayon drawings. The game was only released in Japan.

== Gameplay ==
Gameplay screenshot

Rakugaki Showtime is a fighting game in a full 3D fighting arena. It features up to four players. Throwing projectiles feature prominently in the game, which has led to some reviewers comparing the game to being similar to dodgeball, but lacking a dividing line between the teams. The game features 17 playable characters, including guest character Marina Liteyears from Mischief Makers.

== Development and release ==
Rakugaki Showtime was Treasure's first original project for PlayStation. It featured music composed by Kenta Watanabe, who had previously worked on Banpresto's Panzer Bandit (1997). The game was released on 29 July 1999, and published by Enix. The game was given a very limited release because of a legal dispute over who owned the characters between Enix and Treasure. The game became a rare item after its release, and would sell for 15,000 yen ($150 U.S.). It was re-released for the PlayStation Network "Game Archives" in Japan on 25 June 2008. It retailed for 600 yen. The game was to be the basis for the GameCube and PlayStation 2 fighting game based on Tiny Toon Adventures, called Tiny Toons: Defenders of the Universe, but the game was never released. It was later leaked onto the internet.

== Reception ==
Reception

Review scores
| Publication | Score |
|---|---|
| Famitsu | 26/40 |
| GameFan | 87/100 |
| GameSpot | 7.4/10 |

Rakugaki Showtime was met with positive reception from critics.
