= Bangai-O HD: Missile Fury =

2011 video game

- Developer: Treasure
- Publisher: D3 Publisher
- Platform: Xbox 360 (XBLA)
- Release: 4 May 2011
- Genre: Multidirectional shooter
- Modes: Single-player, multiplayer

Bangai-O HD: Missile Fury (Japanese: バンガイオーHD ミサイルフューリー) is a 2011 multidirectional shooter developed by Treasure and published by D3 Publisher for the Xbox 360. It is the sequel to Bangai-O Spirits and the third game in the Bangai-O series.

== Gameplay ==
Missile Fury is a scrolling bullet hell multidirectional shooter. The player controls a mech that is equipped with missiles and lasers. Special moves like invincible dash and charge attack can be used. The player has free movement in each of the over 100 levels. The objective of each level is to destroy every enemy. If the player dies three times in a level, the next one unlocks automatically. In Fury mode, every level can be played cooperatively online or via system link. A level editor allows the creation of levels that can be then shared online but only with players on a friend list.

== Reception ==
Reception

Aggregate score
Aggregator	Score
Metacritic	78/100

Review scores
Publication	Score
Edge	8/10
Eurogamer	8/10
Game Informer	7.75/10
GamePro	4/5
GameRevolution	C−
GameSpot	7.5/10
GameTrailers	6.7/10
GameZone	9/10
IGN	8.5/10
Joystiq	4/5
Official Xbox Magazine (US)	8/10
Metro	9/10

The game sold 12,923 units worldwide by the end of 2011.

The game received "generally favourable reviews" according to the review aggregation website Metacritic.

IGN said, "The game is confusing, and hectic, more so than other Treasure shooters, but it's also one of the funnest bullet hell (missile hell? Laser hell? Soccer ball hell?) shoots I've ever played." Game Informer stated, "Bangai-O superfans have a lot to chew on here and should enjoy the many challenges, but others should think twice." GameSpot said, "If you like the Treasure formula, you should have already bought this game, and if you've never played a shooter like this before, this would be a good place to start." Eurogamer summarized: "The mean, almost contemptuous difficulty curve is something that shouldn't be celebrated, but almost everything else is golden."
