= Sin and Punishment =

2000 video game

- Boxart showing off protagonists Saki Amamiya (right) and Airan Jo (left), with Achi in the back
- Developers: Treasure; Nintendo R&D1
- Publisher: Nintendo
- Director: Hideyuki Suganami
- Producers: Masato Maegawa; Takehiro Izushi
- Programmer: Atsutomo Nakagawa
- Artist: Yasushi Suzuki
- Composer: Toshiya Yamanaka
- Platforms: Nintendo 64, iQue Player
- Release: Nintendo 64: JP: 21 November 2000; iQue Player: CHN: 25 September 2004
- Genres: Rail shooter, shooting gallery
- Modes: Single-player, multiplayer

Sin and Punishment (Note: Known in Japan as Tsumi to Batsu: Hoshi no Keishōsha (Japanese: 罪と罰 ～地球の継承者～; "Sin and Punishment: Earth Successor") The reading of 地球, which is normally chikyū (ちきゅう), is changed here to hoshi (ほし).) is a rail shooter video game co-developed by Treasure and Nintendo for the Nintendo 64, and released in Japan in 2000. Its story takes place in the near future of 2007 when war breaks out as humanity is struggling with a global famine. The player takes on the roles of Saki and Airan as they fight to save Earth from destruction. The game employs a unique scheme that uses both the D-pad and control stick on the Nintendo 64 controller, allowing players to maneuver the character while simultaneously aiming the targeting reticle. To progress the game, the player must shoot at enemies and projectiles while dodging attacks to survive.

The development of Sin and Punishment lasted longer than usual for the era. Development commenced in 1997 with only four staff and concluded in 2000 with more people involved than in any of Treasure's previous projects. The guiding inspiration to develop Sin and Punishment was the design of the Nintendo 64 controller. Treasure wanted to make a game that had the player holding the left side of the controller instead of the right which was typical across the system's library. The Treasure team encountered difficulties programming the game, citing the system's complex 3D rendering capabilities and difficulties adapting 2D gameplay ideas into 3D environments.

Sin and Punishment was released to positive reviews. Critics highlighted the game's intensity and flashy graphics, and particularly pointed out Treasure's ability to reduce the game's polygon count to maintain smooth gameplay action while still keeping the graphics stylish. Since the game was not released in the West, it grew a cult following among import gamers, and it became one of the most demanded titles for the Wii Virtual Console after its announcement. It was released in Western territories through the Virtual Console in 2007 to positive reviews. In retrospect, Sin and Punishment is considered one of the best Nintendo 64 games. It was ported to the iQue Player in China in 2004, and a sequel was released for the Wii in 2009, Sin & Punishment: Star Successor.

== Gameplay ==
Saki battling an enemy

Sin and Punishment has been described as an arcade-style rail shooter and shooting gallery video game. The player character is controlled from a behind-the-back perspective, and can strafe left and right, double-jump, and perform a roll dodge. The character progresses forward through the level automatically due to the rail shooter format which drew comparisons from critics to the Panzer Dragoon series, Star Fox series, and Space Harrier. A targeting reticle is used to aim shots on enemies and projectiles and has two modes that the player can freely alternate between, a lock-on mode and a free aiming mode. The lock-on mode will auto-lock onto visible targets, and the player can quickly move the reticle between targets. Alternatively, the free aiming mode gives the player full control of the reticle and a more powerful shot. The player character is also armed with a sword which can be used to damage or destroy nearby enemies, and redirect projectiles back at the enemies. The character can be controlled by a single player, or cooperatively between two players. In cooperative mode, one player controls the movement while the other is responsible for firing duties.

The game supports control schemes for left and right-handed players, switching the character movement controls between the D-pad and C-buttons on the Nintendo 64 controller. The analog stick is used to control the reticle. The game features a score system which grants bonuses the more hits the player can make without losing all their health. If the player loses all their health or the stage timer expires, it is game over. Items can be picked up to refill the player's health gauge, increase the time, and provide bonus points. The game also features three difficulty modes, easy, normal, and hard. Normal and Hard mode feature extra bosses and enemies in addition to being generally more difficult.

== Plot ==
Sin and Punishment is set in a dystopian near future of 2007, when humanity is struggling with a planet-wide famine. To solve this problem, scientists develop a genetically-engineered species to raise as food. These creatures are herded in northern Japan until they mutate and begin attacking the country's citizens. They are dubbed "Ruffians". An international peacekeeping organization called the Armed Volunteers tries to stop the creatures, but they also oppress the Japanese people. Another group, led by a mysterious woman with unusual powers named Achi, rises up to defend Japan against the Ruffians and Armed Volunteers. Within her group are Saki and Airan, the male and female protagonists of the game. Between battles with the Ruffians and Armed Volunteers, Saki unintentionally morphs into an enormous Ruffian after falling into a rising tide of blood filling up Tokyo. To bring Saki back to normal, Achi tells Airan that she will need to shoot Saki, but Airan refuses to do this. In response, Achi places Airan into a dream sequence, set ten years in the future in Long Island, New York. Here she meets her future son she shares with Saki, and sees a Ruffian Saki rampaging through the city. The dream ends with her shooting Saki, and waking up to realize that Achi manipulated her through the dream into having just shot the real world Saki in the present.

After Saki fights Ruffian forces in Hokkaido and Airan is kidnapped, Achi reveals that she is not from Earth, and that the war between the Ruffians and the Armed Volunteers was her ploy to groom Saki into an ultimate warrior to use in a cosmic battle with extraterrestrial beings. She reveals that Saki would help her rule the new Earth she is about to create. Achi creates a new Earth and begins attacking the current Earth. Saki, in a part-human, part-Ruffian state, combines with Airan to revert to his full-Ruffian form while maintaining self-control. Saki and Airan successfully destroy the new Earth and send Achi drifting into space.

After the battle, Saki and Airan revert to their human forms and descend back into Japan, which the battle with Achi has left in ruins. Airan questions what she and Saki will now do, after which they decide to take on the rest of the Ruffians together. They change back into Saki's Ruffian form and head towards Honshu. Meanwhile, as Achi drifts in space, she notes that with Brad and Saki lost as potential warriors, she cannot hope to win against her enemies, but mentions Saki and Airan's future son Isa, who will inherit the former's blood. Seemingly viewing Isa as another candidate, she says that the time for the enemy to call themselves gods is "coming to an end."

== Development ==
=== Background and staffing ===
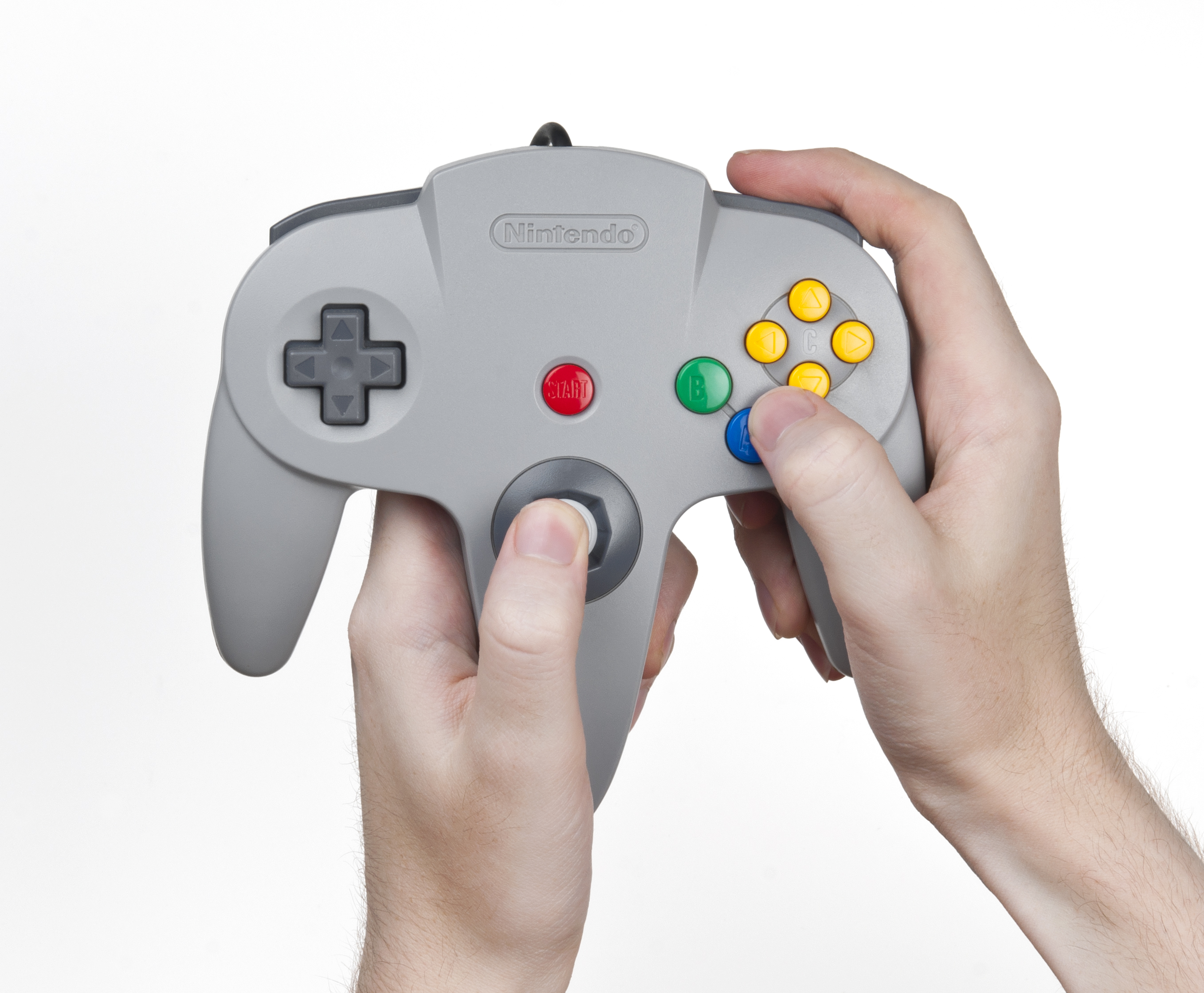
The standard way to hold the Nintendo 64 controller was with the middle and right grips, popularized by Super Mario 64. Treasure wanted to develop a game in which the player holds the left and middle grips.

Sin and Punishment was co-developed by Nintendo Research & Development 1 and Treasure. Development began in 1997 when Treasure submitted their original proposal to Nintendo. The inspiration to develop the game was the design of the Nintendo 64 controller. In the early days of the system's lifespan, Nintendo had suggested two ways of holding the controller, a left and right position. Due to the success of Super Mario 64 which released alongside the console in 1996, many games followed in its trails and featured the same right positioning it used. Treasure president Masato Maegawa began discussing with his team how the left positioning was underutilized and could make for an interesting game. Nintendo expressed concern that the left positioning would feel unnatural to players at first, however Treasure was already expecting this. Nintendo was also developing a movement sensor at the time, which the team considered adapting, but ultimately decided against it as it would have lengthened an already dragging development process. The sensor technology was not finalized by Nintendo until the release of the Wii in 2006.

In the early stages of development, the team was at what Maegawa called "absolute minimum" staffing, two programmers and two designers. Among the staff was head programmer Atsumoto Nakagawa and character and enemy designer Yasushi Suzuki. Both previously held minor roles in developing Treasure's Radiant Silvergun (1998). The director from the Nintendo side of development was Hitoshi Yamagami. By the end of development, more people were involved than in any of Treasure's previous projects. Development took a relatively long time compared with other games of the era. Development began in 1997, a year after the Nintendo 64's arrival to market, and concluded near the end of the system's lifecycle in 2000. In retrospect, Satoru Iwata commented that Treasure was able to accomplish a large amount despite the small size of their team. Maegawa agreed, saying that a small team reduced conflict, and let them stay focused on making the game how they each personally envisioned.

=== Production ===
Sin and Punishment was Treasure's first attempt at a true 3D action game, presenting a challenge to a company known for fast-paced 2D action games. Adhering with typical Treasure culture, the team attempted to push the limits of the hardware, but they still experienced many difficulties programming for the Nintendo 64 hardware. They believed that its Silicon Graphics architecture was more difficult to use because it was a more professional and robust 3D graphics system than on competing hardware. Nakagawa had troubles programming the aiming and shooting mechanics since the reticle moved in two dimensions but the game world was in three. He also struggled with the collision between enemy bullets and the player, which needed to work correctly otherwise it would look and feel unnatural. Lastly, he found the scaling and sizing of the boss characters to be an obstacle because the bosses need to fit in the screen while also appearing large and intimidating. Suzuki also had troubles keeping the texture size and polygon counts low because the Nintendo 64 had restrictive texture mapping limitations. To compensate, the team removed joints in the models to prevent the game speed from dipping too much.

Yamagami found Treasure to be difficult to work with and called them a "weird" company. He encountered troubles establishing deadlines with the Treasure team, who continued to deflect such requests. When Yamagami first played an early prototype of Sin and Punishment, he was impressed but found it too difficult. Treasure responded by saying he should not be supervising the project if he was not skilled enough to play it. Yamagami understood that the level of difficulty was a characteristic of Treasure's games, but still thought it needed to be reduced. Maegawa believed that the difficulty was in players being unable to understand the game's unique control scheme. Discussions about game difficulty continued for almost a year. Towards the end of development, the difficulty level was decreased.

The soundtrack to Sin and Punishment was composed by Toshiya Yamanaka who was employed as a subcontractor before joining Treasure later in his career. All the music was composed using a Roland SC-88 Pro. One of the programmers was able to program in pulse-code modulation (PCM) support, a technology which can play digital audio signals converted from uncompressed analog audio, allowing for higher quality music.

=== Name ===
The game was originally titled Glass Soldier (グラスソルジャー) during most of its development because the main character was fragile like glass. The title was written in katakana, a Japanese writing system typically used when writing foreign words, however many game titles were written in katakana during this era. To help the game stand out, Yamagami wanted to create a new title written in kanji, another Japanese writing system. Perfect Dark (2000) was in development at the time, and was known in Japan with a kanji title, Aka to Kuro (赤と黒; lit. "Red and Black"). Yamagami took inspiration from this name to think up a new title, Tsumi to Batsu (罪と罰; lit. "Sin and Punishment"), famously sharing its exact title with Fyodor Dostoevsky's 1866 literary masterpiece Crime and Punishment. While this shared name occasionally caused tongue-in-cheek confusion or literary expectations among Japanese consumers, Yamagami wanted a striking, dramatic title. Thinking the title may be too obscure, Yamagami approached young staff members for a subtitle. They suggested Chikyū no Keishōsha (地球の継承者; lit. "Earth Successor" or "Successor of the Earth"), but with the reading of the "chikyū" kanji (地球) which means "Earth" changed to "hoshi" which means "star". One of the other titles considered was "Dark Wasteland". The Treasure team initially did not like the change in name brought by Nintendo, but gradually took a liking to it.

== Release ==
Sin and Punishment was revealed in August 2000. The game was first released exclusively in Japan on the Nintendo 64 on 21 November as the console's life cycle was approaching its end. The game was targeted towards older gaming audiences, and sold about 100,000 copies. Maegawa said he could not call the game a financial success, but Nintendo had wanted the genre to be represented on the Nintendo 64. The game was ported to the iQue Player and released in China in 2004.

Sin and Punishment grew a cult following in western territories among import gamers, and was regarded as one of the best Nintendo 64 games to never see localization. Nintendo's 2001 E3 press kit mentioned that it would be on display at Nintendo's booth, but was not shown. With the release of Nintendo's Virtual Console for the Wii, Sin and Punishment became one of the most demanded titles. The game featured English voice acting, which also made it a good candidate for re-release. It was finally released on the Wii Virtual Console in Japan on 20 September 2007, in PAL regions on 28 September 2007, and in North America on 1 October 2007. The localized releases featured English menus. The game was later re-released on the Wii U Virtual Console in North America on 27 August 2015, in PAL regions on 3 September, and in Japan on 25 April 2016. Sin and Punishment was among the first Nintendo 64 games added to the Nintendo Classics service in October 2021.

== Reception ==
Reception

Aggregate score
Aggregator	Score
GameRankings	86%

Review scores
Publication	Score
GameSpot	7.1/10
IGN	9.0/10
N64 Magazine	89%
Nintendo Life	9/10
Cubed3	8/10
Dengeki Nintendo 64	8/10, 7/10, 7/10

In Japan, the four reviewers in Dengeki Nintendo 64 complimented the games fresh style which they felt had a more mature appeal compared to other Nintendo 64 games. The reviewers found the controls complicated at first, but were shooting enemies regularly as they became familiar with them. Two reviewers found the game might be too challenging for the average player.

Although it was not localized for its original release, some western critics still imported Sin and Punishment for review. Fran Mirabella III of IGN found it to be a "tour de force" of arcade-style shooting action, and praised Treasure for their excellence at developing games in the genre. He concluded that it was one of the most unique and daring games on the Nintendo 64, as well as one of the best, but did make some complaints with regards to its short length. Jeff Gerstmann of GameSpot described Sin and Punishment as a technical and artistic achievement, but was even more harsh on the game's short length, and also felt the game was too easy. Both reviewers believed that the game had excellent graphics, full of flashy explosions and lots of onscreen items. They both pointed out the game's low-polygon models, but believed this was a fair sacrifice to keep the game running at a smooth frame rate.

In retrospective reviews for the game's Virtual Console release, critics praised Nintendo for making the moves to re-release Sin and Punishment and finally localize it for western audiences. Frank Provo of GameSpot found the release to be a bargain, seeing as the original Nintendo 64 cartridges were uncommon and approaching US$100 in price on the used game market. Even though the original game was built around the Nintendo 64 controller, critics still found the GameCube controller worked well as a substitute. Critics shared the shared sentiments of reviews at the time in regard to the game's intense and furious action, stylish graphics, and smooth frame rate, while again also criticizing its short length. Concluding their thoughts, Adam Riley of Cubed3 called Sin and Punishment a "cult legend", Damien McFerran of Nintendo Life believed it to be the pinnacle of the Nintendo 64 library, and Lucas M. Thomas of IGN called it a "Nintendo 64 masterpiece" and the perfect hardware swan song the west never got to hear. In 2009, Official Nintendo Magazine ranked the game 64th on a list of greatest Nintendo games. Eurogamer, in a 2022 article about "nine of the very best Treasure games" said it "might be one of the most beautiful games ever seen" and was "absolutely blinding fun to blast through".

== Legacy ==
Retro Gamer included Sin and Punishment among their list of top ten Nintendo 64 games, highlighting the game's intensity and hardware pushing prowess, and IGN included it among their list of best Virtual Console games. Todd Ciolek of GameSetWatch described it as one of the best games in the sparsely populated shooting gallery genre along with Wild Guns (1994).

A novelization of the game was published in Japan in early 2001. A comic adaption was also printed in Dengeki Daioh magazine. The character Saki Amamiya re-appeared as an "assist trophy" in Super Smash Bros. Brawl (2008) and Super Smash Bros. for Nintendo 3DS and Wii U (2014), a minor role where he can suddenly appear and damage players. Saki did not return as an Assist Trophy in Super Smash Bros. Ultimate, but he received a Mii costume, where his outfit and hairstyle can be used as costume pieces for certain fighters.

Nintendo and Treasure collaborated again for a sequel for the Wii released in 2009, Sin & Punishment: Star Successor.
