= Gunstar Super Heroes =

2005 video game

- Developer: Treasure
- Publishers: Sega (JP/NA); THQ (EU)
- Director: Tetsu Okano
- Producer: Masato Maegawa
- Designer: Hideyuki Suganami
- Programmer: Kazuhiko Ishida
- Artist: Tetsuhiko Kikuchi
- Writer: Tetsu Okano
- Composer: Norio Hanzawa
- Platform: Game Boy Advance
- Release: JP: October 6, 2005; NA: October 25, 2005; EU: November 4, 2005
- Genre: Run and gun
- Mode: Single-player

Gunstar Super Heroes, (Note: Japanese: ガンスタースーパーヒーローズ, Hepburn: Gansutā Sūpā Hīrōzu) also known as Gunstar Future Heroes in Europe, is a run and gun video game for the Game Boy Advance developed by Treasure and published by Sega in 2005. It is the sequel to the 1993 Sega Genesis game Gunstar Heroes, with the story taking place after the events of the original game and featuring an expanded combat system over its predecessor.

== Gameplay ==
The gameplay makes a number of changes from the original Gunstar Heroes. The controls for Red and Blue no longer distinguish by the Free and Fixed Shot, and both have more advanced, equal, and versatile controls. The Throw from the original is taken out, and various melee attacks are now performed by using the A and B buttons in combination with the D-pad. The ability to combine different weapons is temporarily absent - instead, the player has the option to select from three weapon types at any time in the game. The game also uses a supercharge meter that fills as the player defeats enemies. Using this energy allows the player to fire a powerful attack.

== Plot ==
Taking place after the destruction of the "God of Ruin" (also known as Golden Silver, the final boss) at the end of Gunstar Heroes, the explosion created four moons orbiting the Earth. However, many years later, the creation of a fifth moon reveals a plan to resurrect the malevolent Empire and Golden Silver once again.

Protagonists Red and Blue, named as such in tribute to the legendary warriors from the original Gunstar Heroes, combat the Empire as part of an organization called "The Third Eye". Together with Yellow, the Gunstars must travel to the moons, stop the resurrected Empire, and recapture the Treasure Gems, four mystical stones with an unknown power that drove the story of the previous game. Super Heroes has different storylines based on the difficulty chosen and which character the player is playing as.

Most of Gunstar Super Heroes's characters are named after characters from the original Gunstar Heroes, and while many of these new characters bear distinct resemblances to the equivalent characters from the first game, one notable exception is Red, who is female, unlike the original Gunstar Red, who was male.

== Reception ==
Reception

Aggregate scores
Aggregator	Score
GameRankings	83%
Metacritic	83 of 100

Review scores
Publication	Score
1Up.com	A−
Electronic Gaming Monthly	7.67 of 10
Eurogamer	5 of 10
Famitsu	34 of 40
Game Informer	8.75 of 10
GameSpot	8.9 of 10
GameSpy	4.5 of 5
IGN	9.0 of 10
Nintendo Power	9.5 of 10
Play	9 of 10
Yahoo! Games	4 of 5

Award
Publication	Award
	IGN Editors' Choice Award

The game was almost universally praised by critics as a compelling action game and received high scores, even receiving several "Best GBA Game Of E3 2005" awards. However, the game still did not sell very well, and Nintendo Power has urged gamers numerous times to get the game, disappointed that it didn't appear in the top-selling GBA games list.
