= Stretch Panic =

2001 video game

- North American PlayStation 2 cover art
- Developer: Treasure
- Publishers: NA: Conspiracy Entertainment; EU: Swing! Entertainment; JP: Kadokawa Shoten
- Director: Kōichi Kimura
- Programmers: Yoshiyuki Matsumoto; Yuji Yamanaka; Tahei Katagai
- Artists: Kiyotaka Ōhashi; Takuro Nakamura; Kōichi Kimura; Gō Nakazawa
- Composer: Norio Hanzawa
- Platform: PlayStation 2
- Release: EU: July 27, 2001; NA: August 28, 2001; JP: December 6, 2001
- Genre: Action
- Mode: Single-player

Stretch Panic, known as Freak Out in Europe and Oceania and Hippa Linda (ひっぱリンダ, Hippa Rinda) in Japan, is an action game designed by Treasure Co. Ltd. It was a landmark title for the developer as it was their first game to feature movement in three dimensions; prior to Stretch Panic they had been a developer of 2D titles. The game revolves around a girl named Linda who has the power to pinch, stretch, and bend objects and enemies with a magic scarf as she battles her demon possessed sisters. The game was released on July 27, 2001 in Europe, August 28, 2001 in North America and December 6, 2001 in Japan.

== Plot ==
The story stars a girl named Linda who lives with her twelve vain sisters, who are obsessed with beauty and treat Linda as their errand girl, often making fun of her scarf. One day, a mysterious present appears on the family's doorstep which, upon being opened unleashes thirteen vanity demons. As twelve of the demons manage to kidnap and possess the other sisters, the thirteenth demon becomes stuck in Linda's scarf. With everyone sucked into a weird dimension, Linda, now having full command over her newly possessed scarf, sets out to save her twelve sisters and exorcise the twelve demons possessing them.

== Gameplay ==
Stretch Panic sees players in the role of Linda, a girl who must use her newly possessed scarf to rescue her sisters that have been possessed by demons. Linda's scarf has the unique ability to grab onto its environment and stretch it as if it were elastic. Players can aim the scarf towards an object or enemy and, once it has grabbed something, pull it and then snap it back to damage it. Linda can also grab the ground, and then pull back and launch herself across distances and heights. Linda can also grab onto an object or enemy and charge up the tension of the scarf to perform a charging head butt move. Damage is determined by three levels, weak blue attacks, medium yellow attacks and strong red attacks that are achieved by attacking an enemy's weak points. The health of Linda and the bosses are represented by a star shaped chart, which fills up as they take damage. If Linda takes too much damage and fills up her star chart, she will be returned to the main hub.

The game starts off in a main hub, where players can access the available levels, save their progress, and access a gallery where they can freely stretch the bosses they have exorcised. There are two sets of levels: EX levels, which are platforming levels, and boss fights. The EX levels are notable for having only one enemy type: women with comically enormous breasts. Points can be earned by attacking these enemies on their weak points, their heads, which are required to enter each of the boss levels. Each boss is unique, featuring its own strategies and weak points. Linda can defeat each boss by dealing enough damage to it, after which she can re-enter the stage at no extra cost. However, to truly defeat a boss and rescue the possessed sister, the player must successfully perform a Smart Bomb move, which requires five points to use, to exorcise the demon possessing the boss before defeating it. As bosses are defeated, more levels become available.

== Reception ==
Reception

Aggregate score
Aggregator	Score
Metacritic	65/100

Review scores
Publication	Score
AllGame	2.5/5
Edge	8/10
Electronic Gaming Monthly	4.83/10
Famitsu	30/40
Game Informer	7.5/10
GamePro	4/5
GameSpot	7.1/10
GameSpy	73%
IGN	7/10
Next Generation	2/5
Official U.S. PlayStation Magazine	3.5/5
Maxim	3/5

The game received "mixed or average" reviews, according to the review aggregation website Metacritic. Maxim gave the game a mixed review, over a month before it was released Stateside. Chester "Chet" Barber of NextGen said, "Stretch Panic looks unique and includes a few original ideas, but with such a flawed game design, it's not worth the effort." In Japan, however, Famitsu gave it a score of 30 out of 40.
