= Bangai-O Spirits =

2008 video game

- Developer: Treasure
- Publishers: JP: Entertainment Software Publishing; WW: D3 Publisher
- Director: Mitsuru Yaida
- Designer: Makoto Ogino
- Composer: Norio Hanzawa
- Platform: Nintendo DS
- Release: JP: March 19, 2008; NA: August 12, 2008; PAL: August 29, 2008
- Genre: Shoot 'em up
- Modes: Single player, multiplayer

Bangai-O Spirits (Note: Bangai-O Spirits (バンガイオー魂, Bangaiō Supirittsu)) is a shoot 'em up for the Nintendo DS, and the sequel to Bangai-O which was released on the Nintendo 64 and Dreamcast. A sequel, Bangai-O HD: Missile Fury, was released in 2011.

Bangai-O Spirits is a side-scrolling shooting game with free-scrolling levels that extend horizontally and vertically. The player controls a robot with the ability to fly, but is still affected by gravity. He has seven weapons to choose from, and can perform melee attacks using a baseball bat or sword.

The game has 160 levels, and features a level editor to create more. Edited levels can be encoded in a sound that can be recorded with a computer and shared between players. This technology was inspired by the datacasettes used by some older computers, including the Sharp X1 on which Matsumoto learned to program.

== Plot ==
Bangai-O Spirits has very little story line, and is not part of the same continuity as the previous game. The two new pilots are called Masato (boy) and Ruri (girl). The campaign mode is limited to a brief set of tutorial stages.

Upon completing all of the stages under "Treasure's Best" in free mode, a brief cutscene will play, with one of the characters saying, "We're only here because the fanboys would throw a fit on the internet if the game didn't have an ending."

== Development ==
In a rare breach of the company's usual secrecy about future plans, developer Yoshiyuki Matsumoto first hinted at a sequel to Bangai-O in a 2003 interview on Sega's website to promote the game Astro Boy: Omega Factor. When asked what game he would like to create next, he said he would like to "carry out Bakuretsu Muteki Bangai-O's revenge".

Treasure began working on a concept demo before a publisher was involved. Full production followed the completion of their previous handheld release, Bleach: Dark Souls. When publisher ESP approached them about a possible collaboration, Bangai-O seemed like a logical fit. It was demonstrated at Tokyo Game Show in September.

The game was released in North America by D3 Publisher of America on August 12, 2008.

Treasure handled the localization for the game in-house, adding features they did not have time to include in the Japanese release. Treasure previously did this with the North American version of Astro Boy: Omega Factor, which featured new enemies, difficulty modes, and refined level layouts, and is generally considered a stronger product than the original Japanese version.

== Gameplay ==
The player is able to choose two weapons from a list that includes various missiles, melee weapons, and a defensive shield.

The player is also able to choose two EX weapons from a list of homing, napalm, rebound, break, direction, reflector, and freeze. The use of the EX Attack unleashes loads of missiles. More missiles will be fired the longer one charges the attack, and the closer one is to enemy projectiles. The exception is the freeze EX Attack, which "freezes" the screen, but this is still affected by the amount of projectiles en route to the player. The direction EX attack sends all of the attack at a single enemy, while the reflector EX attack reflects all the enemy fire.

Also added is the ability for the player to dash. While dashing the player moves forward faster than normal and is able to both damage and travel through enemies and scenery but cannot fire.

A new defensive skill is the ability to knockback enemies and objects. The bat, dash, and reflect EX are the only ways to knockback enemies. Enemies that are knockedback can knockback other enemies which could cascade into a very large and damaging "wave" of knockedback enemies.

== Reception ==
Reception

Aggregate score
Aggregator	Score
Metacritic	83/100

Review scores
Publication	Score
1Up.com	B
Eurogamer	10/10
Famitsu	29/40
Game Informer	7.5/10
GameDaily	8/10
GameRevolution	A−
GameSpot	8/10
GameSpy	4/5
Hardcore Gamer	4.5/5
IGN	8.1/10
Nintendo Power	8/10
Nintendo World Report	9/10
Pocket Gamer	4.5/5
Retro Gamer	93%

The game received "generally favorable" reviews according to the review aggregation website Metacritic. In Japan. Famitsu gave it a score of 29 out of 40. Eurogamer called it "glorious, eclectic, furiously inventive, dizzying, baffling, confusing, witty, clever and beautiful." GameRevolution compared the game to Geometry Wars.

Edge gave the Japanese import nine out of ten, saying, "While certainly being Treasure's most fragmented game, there's a sense that the lack of narrative, character and even proper framework makes this its most raw, pure and delightful." GameZone also gave the game nine out of ten, calling it "one of the toughest, craziest, most variety-packed titles you'll ever play." GamePro said of the game, "It's obviously aimed squarely at the hardcore DS gamer; and while the intense action and high difficulty will probably turn off the casual crowd, it's a solid shooter for anyone who's looking for a challenge." (Note: GamePro gave the game 3.5/5 for graphics, two 4/5 scores for sound and control, and 3.75/5 for fun factor.)

The game was a nominee for Best Shooting Game and Best Use of Sound for the Nintendo DS by IGN in their 2008 video game awards.

Tim Rogers, writing for Kotaku, ranked the game at #1 in his 2018 retrospective on the best games released in 2008 calling it "a game God would play".
