= Tiny Toon Adventures: Defenders of the Universe =

Cancelled fighting video game

- Planned PlayStation 2 cover
- Developer: Treasure
- Publishers: Conspiracy Entertainment; Swing! Entertainment
- Director: Tetsuhiko Kikuchi
- Designers: Tetsuhiko Kikuchi; Kouji Kitatani; Tsunehisa Kanagae; Seiji Hasuko
- Programmers: Fukuryuu; Masaki Ukyo; Yoshihiro Miura
- Composer: Norio Hanzawa
- Platforms: PlayStation 2, GameCube
- Release: Cancelled
- Genre: Fighting
- Modes: Single-player, multiplayer

Tiny Toon Adventures: Defenders of the Universe is a cancelled fighting game based on the Tiny Toon Adventures franchise. It was initially scheduled for release in mid-2002, but was cancelled for unknown reasons, despite having completed development. It was developed by Treasure and originally slated for the PlayStation 2 and GameCube. On 25 February 2009, a disc image of the game was released by a member of the Internet forum Lost Levels.

The surviving voice actors from the TV series reprised their roles as their characters for this game, with Charlie Adler returning as the voice of Buster (as well as voicing Zag) and Billy West replacing the late Don Messick as the voice of Hamton.

== Gameplay and premise ==
Screenshot of the game

The plot of Defenders of the Universe centers on Montana Max taking over the planet Gold Star. Natives of the planet, the Bullions, escape and ask Buster Bunny, Babs Bunny, Plucky Duck, and Hamton Pig for help.

== Development and cancellation ==
Originally titled Tiny Toon Adventures: Defenders of the Looniverse, Defenders of the Universe was first announced in 2001 with a planned spring 2002 release. It was later expected for release by the summer that same year.

In 2004, Douglas C. Perry for IGN suggested that the game had always been intended for release, mentioning that it was "still officially slated to come out sometime (not necessarily in 2004)". While the game was given an ESRB rating and was shown on retail listings, it was never released in any capacity, with no official reason given.

== Reception ==
Kurt Kalata from Hardcore Gaming 101 theorized that the game was planned to be the spiritual successor to Treasure's 1999 Japanese-exclusive Rakugaki Showtime, noting its similarities in gameplay and mechanics. Shared staff between the two games include director and co-designer Tetsuhiko Kikuchi, co-designer Tsunehisa Kanagae, and programmer Masaki Ukyo.
