= Mischief Makers =

1997 video game

- North American box art
- Developer: Treasure
- Publishers: JP: Enix; NA/PAL: Nintendo
- Director: Hideyuki Suganami
- Producer: Yuuchi Kikumoto
- Programmer: Masato Maegawa
- Writer: Hideyuki Suganami
- Composer: Norio Hanzawa
- Platform: Nintendo 64
- Release: JP: June 27, 1997; NA: October 1, 1997; EU: December 12, 1997; AU: 1998
- Genre: Platform
- Mode: Single-player

Mischief Makers (Note: Known in Japan as Yuke-Yuke!! Trouble Makers (Japanese: ゆけゆけ!!トラブルメーカーズ, Hepburn: Yuke Yuke!! Toraburu Mēkāzu)) is a side-scrolling platform game developed for the Nintendo 64 gaming console by Treasure, and published in 1997 by Enix in Japan and by Nintendo internationally. The player assumes the role of Marina Liteyears, a robotic maid who journeys to rescue her creator, Professor Theo, from the emperor of Planet Clancer. The gameplay is displayed in 2.5D, based on grabbing, shaking, and throwing objects within five worlds and 52 levels.

It is the first 2D side-scrolling game for the Nintendo 64, and Treasure's first release for a Nintendo console. The 12-person team began development in mid-1995 with little knowledge of the prototype console. The team wanted to make a novel gameplay mechanic, and implementing the resultant "catching" technique became their most difficult task. The game was announced at the 1997 Electronic Entertainment Expo and was released in Japan on June 27 that year and later in the United States, Europe, and Australia.

On release, Mischief Makers received mixed reviews from critics. They praised its inventiveness, personality, and boss fights, but criticized its short length, low difficulty, low replay value, sound, and harsh introductory learning curve. However, retrospective reviewers disagreed with the originally poor reception, and multiple reviewers noted Marina's signature "Shake, shake!" sound bite as a highlight. Video game journalists appealed for its reissue either through the Nintendo eShop or in a sequel or franchise reboot. In 2009, GamesRadar called it possibly the most underrated Nintendo 64 game.

== Gameplay ==
As Marina grabs a bomb, "clanball" platforms and warp stars float nearby.

Mischief Makers is the first single-player 2D side-scrolling platform game on the Nintendo 64. Its gameplay combines platform game mechanics with aspects from the action and puzzle genres. The characters and backgrounds are modeled in pre-rendered 3D similar to Donkey Kong Country's "Advanced Computer Modeling". This style, with 3D backgrounds behind 2D gameplay, is known as 2.5D. Its gameplay is more exploratory than previous run-and-gun games from Treasure.

The player-character, a robotic maid named Marina, journeys to save her kidnapped creator. The story takes place on Planet Clancer, a world on the cusp of civil war due to the actions of its Emperor and his Imperial forces. The Emperor brainwashes Clancers to kidnap the visiting robotics genius Professor Theo. Theo's creation, the player-character Ultra-InterGalactic-Cybot G Marina Liteyears, pursues the professor and grabs, throws, and shakes the obstacles in her way, such as enemies, floating "Clanball" platforms, warp stars, and missiles. Almost all game objects can be grabbed, which lends towards the shake-based combat system. Marina can shake "grabbed" objects to throw them as projectiles or to find loot. Objects sometimes change functions when shaken, such as items that become homing missiles and guns with multi-directional shots. Some drop red, blue, and green gems, which restore player health. The health gauge in the corner of the screen shows the amount of damage Marina can take. The player can store up to two additional stock lives. Yellow gems hidden in each level extend the final cutscene's length. Marina can run, jump, and boost (via jetpack) in the eight cardinal and ordinal directions. She can also slide, hover, and roll.

The game has five worlds with roughly twelve levels apiece. (Note: The five worlds are Planet Clancer, Migen's Shrine, Mt. Snow, Aster's Lair, and the Imperial HQ, and there are 52 levels accessed via a stage select screen.) Some levels are action-only while others include puzzles. The player's goal is to reach a warp star at each level's end. En route, Marina shakes enemies, breaks blocks, uses weapons, and rides "bikes" and objects along wire path mazes. Each world has both final and mid-level bosses. The levels and boss fights use scaling and screen rotation special effects to vary the gameplay.

Almost all things on Planet Clancer—including people, buildings, and pets—either wear or are inscribed with identical "sad" faces with red, glowing eyes. A Clancer named Teran substitutes for Marina in several brief areas and uses non-shake mechanics like punching, kicking, and double jumping. A character named Calina, a petulant Clancer who imitates Marina, recurs as a comedic device.

== Development ==
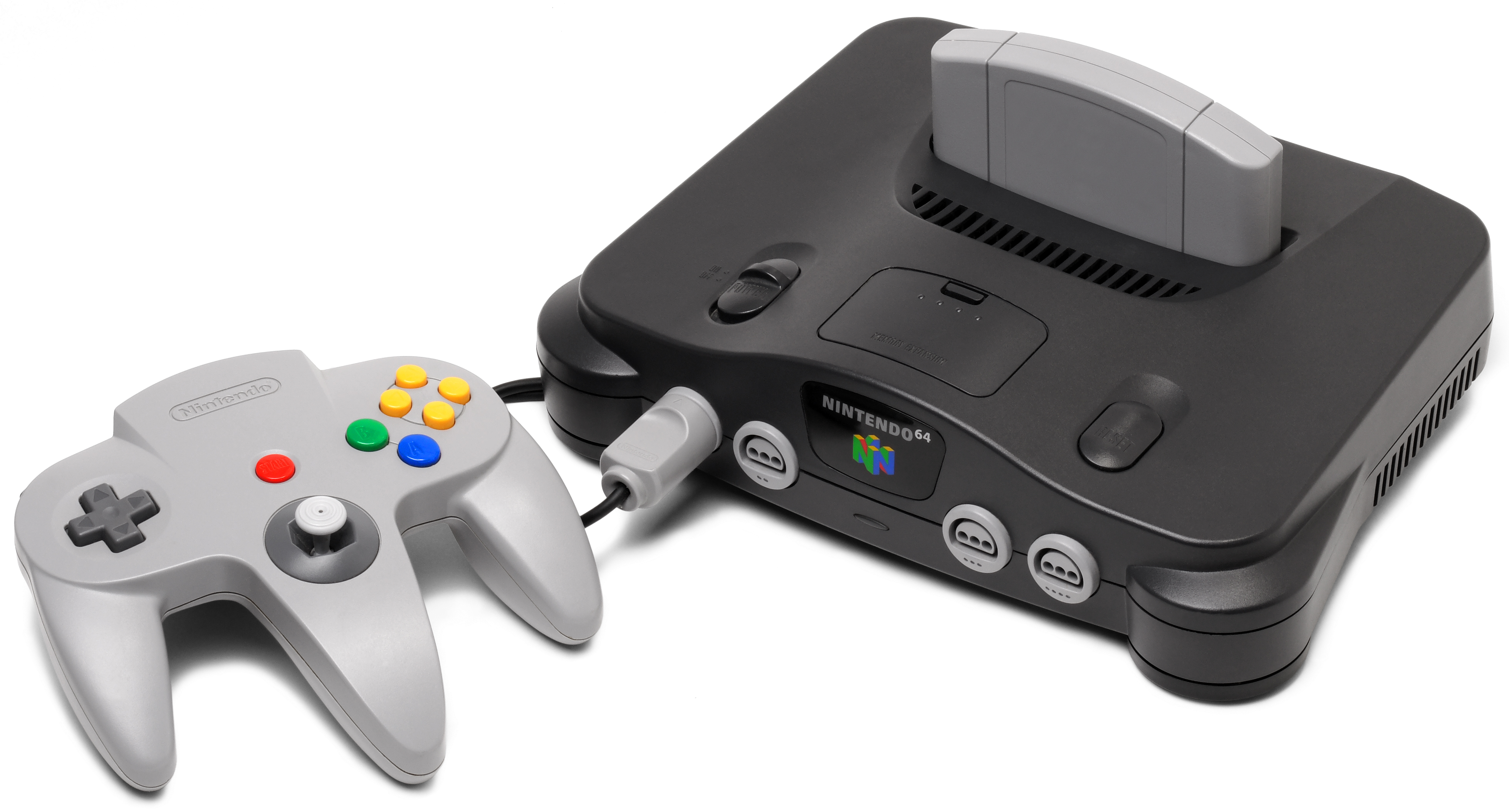
The Nintendo 64 console

Treasure began to develop Mischief Makers in mid-1995, before the Nintendo 64's launch in mid-1996. At the time, little was known about the prototype console's future final technical specifications, graphics implementation, and development kit, but were nevertheless interested in the console and its improved "pixel quality". Historically, Treasure developed games exclusively for Sega consoles, (Note: Treasure continued to develop for the Sega Genesis even while Nintendo had market control because the team found the Genesis development process easier.) which made Mischief Makers its first release for a Nintendo console. Choosing the Nintendo 64 was a hardware-based decision; the Nintendo 64 Game Pak cartridges were more expensive than CD-ROMs, but they loaded data instantly and were thus more conducive for action games such as this. However, Treasure CEO Masato Maegawa said that development for the Nintendo 64 had a harsher learning curve than even the Sega Saturn. Other than the special attention required to build a single boss in 3D, the team did not use features specific to the Nintendo 64 hardware.

Treasure's founders had come from Konami, where they had worked on Nintendo Entertainment System games such as Castlevania and Contra. They found their development environment restrictive and left to try riskier concepts and to singularly focus on making "great games". In the three years between Treasure's founding and Mischief Makers's development, the company released highly regarded games such as Gunstar Heroes—known as "one of the definitive 16-bit action games"—and Dynamite Headdy. An average of 12 people worked on Mischief Makers, with up to 15 at times. Though the team was different in composition from that of previous Treasure games, it included the lead programmer and character designer from Gunstar Heroes. Treasure's CEO said that the staff liked to expand into new genres, though primarily in genres where the staff had experience. The company sought to depart from the Gunstar Heroes shoot 'em up design, and chose to build Mischief Makers around an original "catching" gameplay mechanic, which became the hardest aspect to implement. While foreign (non-Japanese) games were popular within the company, Treasure's CEO said the company's games did not look "particularly foreign" and could appeal to Japanese audiences.

The game is Treasure's first to have been published by Enix. The publisher sought Treasure for its reputation in the action game genre, and had approached Treasure several times before the Nintendo 64 project surfaced. Treasure CEO Maegawa was already fond of Enix, having applied unsuccessfully to work there as a student. Upon choosing the Nintendo 64, Treasure thought it would be a "good idea" to work with Enix. Similar to how Treasure ended its historic loyalty to the Sega Genesis by developing Mischief Makers for Nintendo, Enix had just recently ended its historic loyalty to Nintendo by signing Dragon Quest VII of its Dragon Quest franchise to Sony. Neither Treasure nor Enix built a "special relationship" with Nintendo specific for Mischief Makers's release, though Nintendo was the publisher for Western markets. Prior to Nintendo proposing to publish the game in the West, Enix said it had no plans to release it outside Japan. When its English localization finished ahead of schedule, the North American release date was advanced two weeks.

Mischief Makers was the only game displayed at the Enix booth at the April 1997 Tokyo Game Show. It was later demonstrated at the 1997 Electronic Entertainment Expo and released in Japan on June 27, 1997, the United States on October 1,, in Europe on December 12, and in Australia in 1998. Its Japanese title is Yuke-Yuke Trouble Makers, or Go-Go Trouble Makers. Near the Japanese launch, Treasure announced that it would continue to develop for the Nintendo 64 with the Japan-only Bakuretsu Muteki Bangaioh, which was released in September and later introduced to North America as Bangai-O.

== Reception ==
Reception

Aggregate scores
Aggregator	Score
GameRankings	73%
Metacritic	70/100

Review scores
Publication	Score
AllGame	3.5/5
Electronic Gaming Monthly	7.5/10, 8.5/10, 8.0/10, 8.0/10
Famitsu	8/10, 8/10, 8/10, 8/10
Game Informer	7/10
GameFan	95%
GameSpot	6.7/10
IGN	6.2/10
N64 Magazine	90% (JP); 90% (US)
Next Generation	3/5
Nintendo Life	8/10
Nintendo Power	6.9/10

Mischief Makers received "mixed or average reviews", according to video game review aggregator platform Metacritic, and a "Gold Hall of Fame" ranking from Japanese magazine Famitsu. Critics praised the inventiveness, personality, "variety", and boss fights, and criticized the brevity, low difficulty, low replay value, sound, and harsh introductory learning curve. Retrospective reviewers were more positive, and multiple reviewers noted Marina's signature "Shake, shake!" sound bite as a highlight. Electronic Gaming Monthly awarded the game its silver award.

IGN's Matt Casamassina said that the game compensated for its average graphics with excellent level design and gameplay challenges. He added that the puzzles require thought, unlike those in other action games, and that the objectives were not clear until after the first few levels. Casamassina praised the transparency effects, anti-aliasing, mipmapping, and scaling rotations. IGN described anticipation for the game as "tremendous", particularly among the target market of "younger gamers and 2D fans". Nintendo Power said that the game was the best side-scroller since Super Mario World. Next Generation wrote that "only diehard 2D platform fans" would be interested and that the game did not meet standards set by Super Mario 64. In contrast, GameFan said that Mischief Makers did for 2D what Super Mario 64 did for 3D, and suggested that Sega should be influenced. GamePro instead argued that the similarity to Mario is superficial, and that Mischief Makers had carved out its own niche with unique gameplay mechanics. GamesRadar retrospectively called it "pure, unadulterated awesome" and "2D brilliance". The website summarized the game as about "grabbing sad-faced aliens, shaking them until gems come out, and then hurling them at other sad-faced aliens". Zachary Miller of Nintendo World Report said that it may be most bizarre and surreal Nintendo 64 game, but Gamasutra's John Harris said that the premise is "only strange to people who have never heard of anime". GameFan described the game as "obviously deeply Japanese", where "old school gameplay and 64-bit visuals finally meet".

Hirokazu Hamamura of Famitsu commended the gameplay for balancing against its poor character design. Other Famitsu reviewers admired Treasure's signature robot designs and were puzzled by the company's choice to use buttons instead of the 3D analog stick. Nintendo Life's Jamie O'Neill praised the characters and disliked the controls. He compared the Calina character to the role of Shadow Mario in Super Mario Sunshine. O'Neill wrote that the intricate controls were "the antithesis of a friendly, approachable, and intuitive platformer" because they used every button on the controller (including the directional pad), though he said that players who persevered through the difficult controls would find them "inventive and unique". He added that the complex controls allowed for experimentation that led to new and fun gameplay, and though the throwing enemies mechanic seemed to follow from Gunstar Heroes, the Clanball platforming was unintuitive. John Harris of Gamasutra wrote that the game borrowed other elements from Gunstar Heroes, with similar protagonists, collectible gems, and bosses. Harris also put Marina's "grab" in a lineage of Treasure's signature counterattack mechanics (where a player can escape an attack with a well-timed button press), which he extrapolated out to counterattacks in Viewtiful Joe and Soul Calibur. As the game took time to learn and understand, O'Neill left the reader to decide whether it was "ultimately convoluted or bordering on sophistication and genius".

Nintendo Life's O'Neill thought the five world bosses were among Treasure's best (in particular, the transforming "Cerberus Alpha" boss), but found the mid-level bosses uninteresting. Peter Bartholow of GameSpot and Electronic Gaming Monthly's reviewers remarked similarly. Sushi-X of Electronic Gaming Monthly added that the technique of looking for a boss's weak spot was similar to Metroid. Famitsu reviewers praised how the game encouraged players to experiment with the basic "grab, throw, and shake" gameplay, and praised the cadence of the short levels. O'Neill of Nintendo Life said it had great variety in gameplay mechanics (from maze puzzles to outrunning lava), graphics (from bosses that scale back the screen to levels with screen rotation), and audio (from upbeat quirk to scary), and added that he was surprised that other critics were against the "unique, varied, and dramatic" sound. GamePro also praised the varied stage objectives, and said the "whimsical" music and sound effects worked perfectly with each stage, though found the voice acting overly cutesy. Scott McCall of AllGame also appreciated the sound, from the voice to the "almost indescribable" music. Gamasutra's John Harris noted its "tremendous variety" in gameplay—from a Track & Field remake to outrunning a missile barrage—as rare for 2D platformers, and commented that "it is obvious that Treasure poured their hearts into this game".

Peter Bartholow of GameSpot summarized Mischief Makers as "a good game that will leave players wanting more". He liked the bosses, which made the player use all available skills but said they were short-lived and easily solved in the context of a short game with tutorials as one-fifth of its levels. He did not consider the ending extension a suitable reward for returning to the levels, and predicted that most players would not finish the game more than once. Game Informer echoed Bartholow's comments about the brevity, and named the seven-event Olympics as a highlight. Sushi-X of Electronic Gaming Monthly wrote that the game seemed incomplete and lamented that "a decent player can finish the game in under three hours", though Next Generation said it was "certainly long enough". The game's frequent reuse of a small selection of titles, objects, sound effects, soundtracks, and bland backgrounds (compared to the "impressive" boss battle animations and effects) led GameSpot's Bartholow to suggest that Mischief Makers was limited by its cartridge space. He concluded that the "decent" game would be "truly excellent ... on another medium". Zachary Miller of Nintendo World Report reported that the graphics did not age well into 2010. Dan Hsu wrote in Electronic Gaming Monthly that the game is "definitely a sleeper hit". Hardcore Gamer's Ryan Cartmel said it went "largely unnoticed", and GamePro claimed that it had "[developed] a strong following in Japan".

=== Legacy ===
Video game journalists from sources such as GamesRadar and Nintendo World Report cited Mischief Makers as suited for reissue either through the Nintendo eShop or in a sequel or franchise reboot. Retro Gamer placed the "masterpiece of mayhem" 80th on its list of "essential" Nintendo 64 games for its "unbridled quality". In 2009, GamesRadar called it "possibly the most underrated and widely ignored" Nintendo 64 game. In the years since, Retro Gamer reported Mischief Makers as a somewhat rare collectible, with a rarity score of 7/10. The website wrote that Mischief Makers was received poorly because players wanted 3D instead of 2D gameplay in Nintendo 64 games. Gamasutra's John Harris added that those who gave it a "bum rap" missed a "surprisingly clever" game. UGO remembered it as innovative, though imperfect, and asked to see Marina reinterpreted and resurrected in a new game. Marina reappeared as an unlockable character in Treasure's 1999 Rakugaki Showtime.
