= Guardian Heroes =

1996 video game

- North American Sega Saturn cover art
- Developer: Treasure
- Publisher: Sega
- Designers: Tetsuhiko Kikuchi; Masaki Ukyo
- Composers: Katsuhiko Suzuki; Norio Hanzawa
- Platforms: Sega Saturn, Xbox 360
- Release: Sega Saturn: JP: January 26, 1996; NA: April 24, 1996; PAL: June 20, 1996; Xbox 360: WW: October 12, 2011
- Genres: Beat 'em up, hack and slash, action role-playing
- Modes: Single-player, multiplayer

Guardian Heroes (Note: In Japanese: Gādian Hīrōzu (ガーディアン ヒーローズ)) is a 1996 beat 'em up action role-playing video game developed by Treasure and published by Sega for the Sega Saturn video game console. The game resembles other beat 'em ups such as Final Fight or Golden Axe, but with action role-playing elements. The development team called it a "fighting RPG".

The game allows players to alter the storyline through their actions, such as choosing between a number of branching paths, leading to multiple endings, and killing civilians and enemies, leading to changes in the Karma meter. The music was composed by Nazo² Suzuki and Norio Hanzawa. Hideki Matsutake, a former member of electronic music band Yellow Magic Orchestra, is credited as playing the synthesizer for the score. It is considered a cult classic of the beat 'em up genre. A sequel was released in 2004 for the Game Boy Advance entitled Advance Guardian Heroes. A remastered version of Guardian Heroes was released for the Xbox 360 in 2011.

== Gameplay ==
In addition to the story mode, the game includes a versus mode wherein up to six players can compete using any of the main characters (and unlockable monsters, bosses, and civilians) in a timed battle or to the death.

The players earn experience points during each scene, and between scenes are able to improve and customize their characters with six attributes: Strength (determines physical damage per hit and distance enemies fly when the character hits them), Vitality (determines HP), Intelligence (governs size and strength of the character's spells), Mental Protection (determines MP and how effectively the character can resist magic attacks), Agility (determines how fast the character moves and executes physical and magical attacks), and Luck (modifies damage the character gives and receives, in addition to improving Nicole's selection of spells).

The game's story mode has multiple paths. The player can choose where they will go and what they do after every level. Different paths lead to different endings, bosses, and levels.

The battlefield has multiple levels. Initially, the player can only access three planes of battle: a foreplane, a middle plane, and a backplane. These planes can be switched between in a set sequence, or at the player's choosing based on which button is pressed. Often, evasive actions can be taken by switching a plane.

== Story ==
A supreme being created the universe to find ultimate warriors to hire as its personal soldiers. A vicious battle was waged between the Earth and Sky Spirits (renamed the Earthblood and the Skyborn in the Xbox 360 Remix). The Sky Spirits bestowed incredible powers upon the humans, effectively making powerful wizards for their own gain. The human wizards joined the effort against the Earth Spirits, banishing them into the darkness. Soon after this was accomplished, the Sky Spirits grew fearful and jealous of the humans, and banished them all into the darkness with the Earth Spirits. Mankind instead opted for a more physical approach to life, and the Time of the Sword began.

One of the human wizards, Kanon, escapes his imprisonment with the Earth Spirits, and comes back to the surface to get his revenge on the Sky Spirits. There, he brings his case up with the existing khans. Since they do not trust him, he destroys them and replaces their kingdom with a wizard kingdom, with puppet khans to do his will. The former king prophesied, prior to his death, that should his reign and the Time of the Sword be brought to such an end, then the sword would resurface and in turn bring an end to Kanon's reign. As a precaution, Kanon banishes every existing sword in his new kingdom, but he overlooks one particular sword, belonging to a fierce, anonymous warrior who fought to the death during Kanon's takeover. Also, the former princess Serena survives the ordeal, and joins the band of knights to try to bring about Kanon's end from the inside.

At the game's start, four warriors – Han, Randy, Nicole, and Ginjiro – find the sword of the valiant warrior. Serena arrives to warn them that the knights have learned of their possession of the sword, and are coming to take it back. The four flee their home as it bursts up in flames during the invasion, then escape the town via separate ways, rendezvousing at the graveyard nearby.

The leader of the Black Knights, Valgar, awaits them there, accompanied by a powerful robotic warrior. They are unable to damage it with normal weapons, and Han resolves to use the new sword against the robot. The sword is struck by lightning, electrocuting Han and causing him to lose his grip on it. The sword then floats over to the burial mound of its original owner, who rises up in zombie form. Enraged, he obliterates Valgar's robot, and attacks Serena. However, the five discover that the warrior obeys any command that they give. They resolve that, with this new ally, the time to begin an attack on Kanon's new kingdom is at hand.

From here, the story splits into various paths. Some involve ultimately fighting against the Sky Spirits, Earth Spirits, and/or the supreme being that made the universe, while others wind up with the warriors ultimately defeating Kanon, only to have to defeat Super Zur, or various rogue robotic warriors that he had left behind, led by the nefarious Golden Silver.

== Characters ==
The main characters in Guardian Heroes are:

- Samuel Han: Han is a former member of the Royal Knights Blue Team. He is a strength-focused character who starts the main story with the legendary sword, which he found and pulled out of some rocks while taking a walk in the forest. His magic is fire-based.
- Randy M. Green: Randy is a sorcerer who travels with Nando, a rabbit-like familiar who fights alongside him. He is a magic/speed character who can use wind, ice, fire, and lightning powers, and his physical attacks are fast and focused on MP recovery. Randy's master appears in-game, but is not one of the playable characters.
- Ginjiro Ibushi: Ginjiro is a ninja who is searching for Muramasa, a sword so powerful it acquired a soul of its own. He is a fast and strong character with balanced attacks that are focused on long jumps and fast attacks for MP recovery. His magic is focused on thunder damage.
- Nicole Neil: Nicole is a cleric with an optimistic worldview. She is a healing-focused character who fights with a staff. She has some offensive magic spells, but most of them are random and not very strong - her main purpose is to heal wounds and block attacks with her magic force field.
- Serena Corsaire: Serena is the commander of the Royal Knights Red Team and seems to know about Han's legendary sword. She is a strong character who fights with a combination of melee and ice-based magic attacks, but is unavailable at the beginning of the game.

Other characters include:

- Undead Warrior: The original owner of the legendary sword rises from his grave and accompanies the Guardian Heroes on their quest. He cannot be directly controlled in story mode, but players can command him to Attack, Defend, Follow, Hold, or Berserk.

== Development ==
Development of Guardian Heroes started in June 1994. According to former Treasure designer Tetsuhiko "Han" Kikuchi, Fill-in-Cafe's Mad Stalker: Full Metal Force and Capcom's Alien VS. Predator arcade game were the main inspirations for Guardian Heroes' design. When asked why Treasure chose to develop a 2D sprite-based game when video game sales were increasingly dominated by 3D games, and when nearly every other Saturn developer was concentrating strictly on 3D games, a Treasure representative commented, "Treasure has built up a tremendous knowledge of 2D sprite know how. It's an asset that we wish to continue using. ... No we didn't think it was risky. In fact the risk is in trying to make a new game. There [are] a lot of companies that have tried and failed to make successful 3D games. Besides, 2D and 3D games can exist alongside each other."

For the Xbox Live Arcade release, Tetsuhiko Kikuchi returned to create new artwork and assisted development. When preparing for the project, Treasure discovered all the source code for the Saturn version was stored on DAT cassettes. The company did not have equipment to read the tapes, so they had to borrow equipment from various divisions within Sega to build an environment that could retrieve the source code.

== Xbox 360 version ==
A remastered version of Guardian Heroes for the Xbox 360 was released on October 12, 2011 via Xbox Live Arcade.

The port makes numerous changes to the original. It has been reformatted for 16:9 aspect ratio, expanding the playfield. The game features both original and "remix" graphics modes and runs in high definition with a remade user interface in both. The remix mode applies an hqx-like upscaling filter along with a pencil-shade effect to the sprites, implements true alpha blending, applies bilinear filtering to the backgrounds and features redrawn spell effects and character portraits.

Players can also choose between original and remix options for the gameplay. Remix mode makes many changes to the game's control and mechanics, but does not impact level design or content. Some of these changes, like the new attacking and dodging controls, air dashing, and air recoveries, were modeled after Treasure's own Bleach: The Blade of Fate, a fighting game that likewise features elements of Guardian Heroes. The script for Story Mode has been rewritten and contains updated dialogue as well as changes in name to the Earth and Sky Spirits, who are now known as the Earthblood and the Skyborn, respectively.

The XBLA release also features online play for the multiplayer modes, and an expanded competitive mode that allows for 12 players instead of six. Arcade Mode, an endless survival gauntlet, is a new addition.

This version was made backwards compatible with the Xbox One on November 6, 2016.

== Reception ==
Reception

Review scores
Publication	Score
Computer and Video Games	93/100
Edge	8/10
Electronic Gaming Monthly	8.125/10
Famitsu	9/10, 5/10, 6/10, 6/10
Game Informer	8/10
Next Generation	3/5
Maximum	5/5
Sega Saturn Magazine	95%

Guardian Heroes was well received. The four reviewers of Electronic Gaming Monthly praised the game's combos, multiple paths, and inclusion of a versus mode. Rad Automatic of Sega Saturn Magazine also praised the multiple paths through the game, but expressed the most enthusiasm about the high difficulty and the three layers on which the action takes place. He concluded, "Innovative, challenging, exciting and tough, Guardian Heroes is a classic in every way." GamePro lambasted the game's long-winded dialogue and graphics, saying that "these poor, simpering graphics have no place on a next-gen machine. Colorful doesn't always mean clean, and there are plenty of jagged edges, pixelated fighters, and breakup." Despite this, the reviewer gave the game a strong recommendation, describing it as the true successor to the Streets of Rage and Golden Axe series. He elaborated that Guardian Heroes retains all the fun of Streets of Rage's beat 'em up action and enhances it with new additions like multihit combos, linking moves, and a branching storyline with multiple endings.

Tom Guise of Computer and Video Games magazine argued that the rough, blocky graphics which GamePro criticized are in fact an asset, since they allow a greater amount of action to take place on screen at once. He called the game "a monumental achievement", additionally praising the multiple routes and the flamboyant excess of the Vs. mode. His co-reviewers Paul Davies and Edward Lomas concurred, and were enthusiastic about the replay value of unlocking characters for Vs. mode. Yasuhiro Hunter of Maximum said that "Treasure's first attempt at a next gen game combines everything they do best - frantic action and an in-depth storyline with great character design." He reported that the action and RPG elements are both easy enough that enthusiasts of either genre would find the game accessible. He also highly praised the game's replay value. A reviewer for Next Generation had a more mixed reaction than other critics, commenting that "Guardian Heroes may be the pinnacle of the [side-scrolling beat-'em-up] genre, but even the best is still a bit on the mindless side." He remarked that while the graphics, lack of slowdown, and six-player versus mode would thrill die hard beat-'em-up fans, the average gamer would find the game fun but repetitive and lacking in originality.

Electronic Gaming Monthly awarded Guardian Heroes Side-Scrolling Game of the Year, explaining that, "The different characters, the numerous special and magical attacks, the branching story lines, the Versus Mode and the anime style all combined to make Guardian Heroes one of the best, most memorable games of '96." The following year EGM ranked it number 66 on their "100 Best Games of All Time", saying it had surpassed the founding games of the beat 'em up genre.

Retrospective feedback on the game has continued to be positive. IGN staff writer Levi Buchanan ranked Guardian Heroes third in his list of the top Sega Saturn games. GamesRadar ranked it as the 5th best Saturn game, stating that "Treasure's original 1996 release remains a wonderful co-op beat-'em-up experience with impressive presentation and exciting combat" It was ranked as the 4th top beat 'em up video game of all time by Heavy.com in 2013, while ScrewAttack voted it as the 5th best beat 'em up of all time. In 2023, Time Extension included the game on their top 25 "Best Beat 'Em Ups of All Time" list.

== Legacy ==
Guardian Heroes influenced the development of later side-scrolling action games. Tom Fulp, programmer and co-founder of The Behemoth, described Castle Crashers as sharing the "spirit" of Guardian Heroes and said that some similarities between the games were intentional, including character leveling, stat selection, unlockable characters and arena battles. Fulp also described Guardian Heroes as one of his favorite games.

The 2012 action role-playing game Code of Princess was developed by members of the original Guardian Heroes development team, including director and character designer Tetsuhiko Kikuchi and lead programmer Masaki Ukyo. The game was subsequently described as a spiritual successor to Guardian Heroes.

== See also ==
- Princess Crown
- Code of Princess - a side-scrolling action RPG with similar gameplay. Guardian Heroes director and character designer Tetsuhiko Kikuchi and lead programmer Masaki Ukyo both worked on the title.
