= Treasure (company) =

Japanese video game developer

Treasure Co., Ltd.
- Native name: 株式会社トレジャー
- Romanized name: Kabushiki-gaisha Torejā
- Type: Private
- Industry: Video games
- Founded: June 19, 1992; 34 years ago
- Headquarters: Nakano, Tokyo, Japan
- Key people: Masato Maegawa (President)
- Products: Software
- Website: treasure-inc.co.jp

Treasure Co., Ltd. (Note: Japanese: 株式会社トレジャー, Hepburn: Kabushiki-gaisha Torejā) is a Japanese video game developer based in Tokyo known for its action, platform, and shoot 'em up games. The company was founded in 1992 by former Konami employees seeking to explore original game concepts and free themselves from Konami's reliance on sequels. Their first game, Gunstar Heroes (1993) on the Sega Genesis, was a critical success and established a creative and action-oriented design style that would continue to characterize its output. Treasure's philosophy in game development has always been to make games they enjoy, not necessarily those that have the greatest commercial viability.

Treasure grew a cult following for its action games developed during the 1990s, and though initially exclusive to Sega platforms, the studio expanded to other platforms in 1997. The company earned recognition from critics, being called one of the best Japanese indie studios and 2D game developers. The company's output decreased in the 2010s, with its most recent release being Gaist Crusher God in 2014.

== History ==
=== Origins and 16-bit era (1990s) ===
Treasure founder and president Masato Maegawa dreamed of working in the video game industry when he was young and began learning computer programming in junior high school. He studied programming in college and was hired by developer and publisher Konami after graduating. At Konami, Maegawa and associates that would later establish Treasure worked on a variety of games including arcade titles The Simpsons (1991) and Bucky O'Hare (1992), and Super NES games Super Castlevania IV (1991), Contra III: The Alien Wars (1992), and Axelay (1992). In 1991, Maegawa and several other Konami employees began planning an original game that would become Gunstar Heroes (1993), but their concept was rejected by Konami. Maegawa and his team were growing frustrated with Konami's growing reliance on sequels to established franchises such as its Castlevania and Teenage Mutant Ninja Turtles series. The team felt consumers wanted original games, and so they left Konami in 1992 to establish Treasure and continue development on Gunstar Heroes.

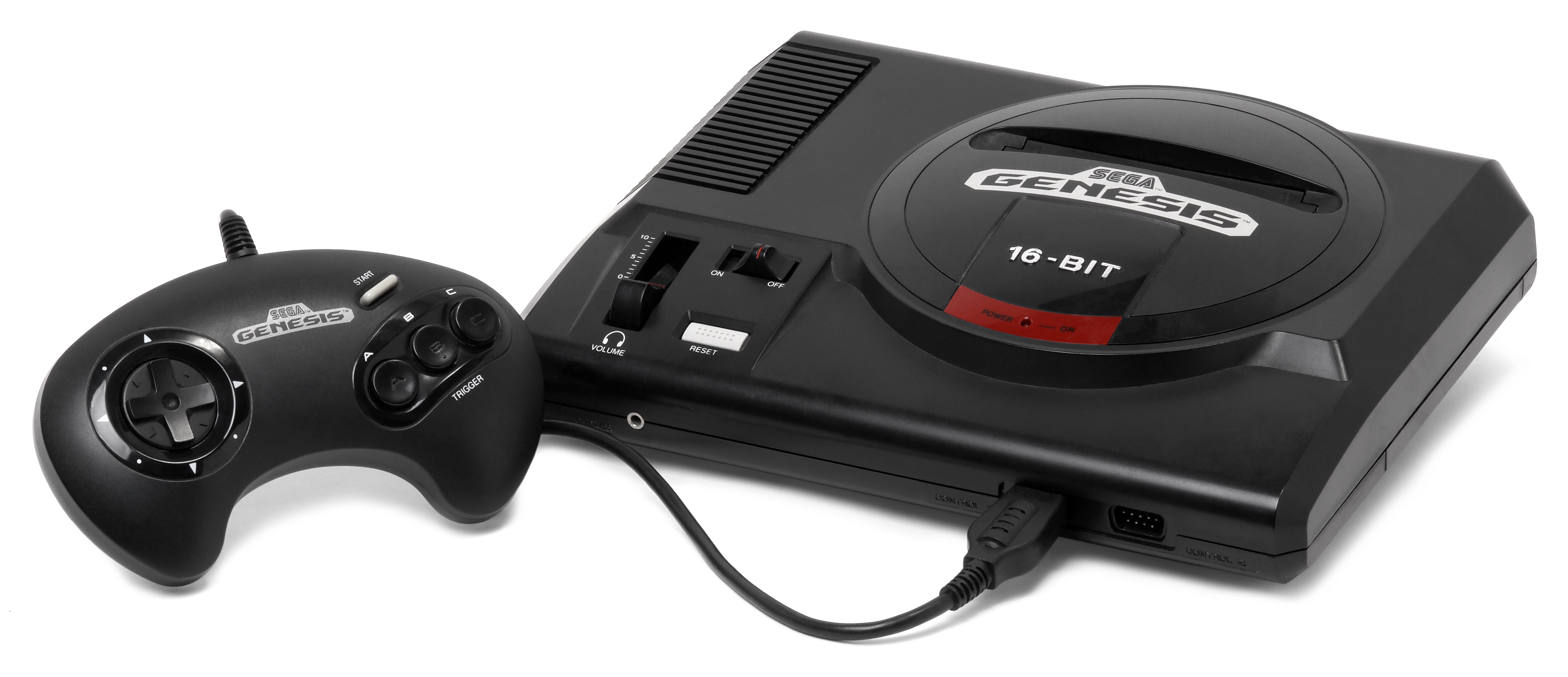
In its first years, Treasure developed video games for the Sega Genesis.

Treasure was founded on June 19, 1992; the company name came from wanting to be a "treasure" to the industry. Around the time of founding, the company had just over ten people. Even though most of the staff made games for the Super NES at Konami, they wanted to develop Gunstar Heroes for the Sega Genesis because the system's Motorola 68000 microprocessor was necessary for the visuals and gameplay they were striving for. Treasure approached Sega for a publishing contract. At first, they were not granted approval because they lacked a track record, but Sega instead contracted them to develop McDonald's Treasure Land Adventure (1993). Several months into development, they were granted approval to work on Gunstar Heroes. Treasure staff was split into two teams to work on both games in parallel. They had a staff of around 18 people at the time, most being ex-Konami programmers. The staff felt they had more freedom working under Sega than Konami.

McDonald's Treasure Land Adventure was completed first, but Treasure decided to finish and release Gunstar Heroes first because they wanted their debut to be an original game. North American magazine GameFan were enthralled with the game and secured the first English language interview with Treasure that year. McDonald's Treasure Land Adventure was released next, initiating a trend for Treasure of developing games based on licensed properties. As a small studio, Treasure required the revenue from licensed games to develop original projects. Treasure continued to develop games for the Genesis for the remainder of the 16-bit era because of the system's smooth sprite movement, and grew a following among Sega fans. After Gunstar Heroes, Treasure was divided into four teams to develop (in order of release): platformer Dynamite Headdy (1994), fighting game Yu Yu Hakusho Makyō Tōitsusen (1994), run and gun Alien Soldier (1995), and action-adventure Light Crusader (1995). The variety among these games illustrated unevenness and unpredictability in Treasure's output that would become characteristic of them.

==== 32-bit era ====
In 1994, Sega introduced the Sega Saturn technology to Treasure. Treasure were impressed with the system's ability to handle a large number of sprites. They also knew their fan base consisted entirely of Sega gamers, so as the 32-bit era began, they moved development to the Saturn. Even though the Saturn was capable of 3D graphics, they continued to develop 2D games because they had built up 2D sprite know-how. Competition from 3D games did not concern them. First on Saturn was Guardian Heroes (1996), a beat 'em up that combines elements from fighting games and RPGs. Treasure worked on their next two releases concurrently, side-scrolling platformers Mischief Makers (1997) and Silhouette Mirage (1997). Mischief Makers was released on the Nintendo 64 and published by Enix, Treasure's first game published by a company other than Sega and released on non-Sega hardware. Treasure chose to develop for the Nintendo 64 because they were interested in the hardware's capabilities. Enix had heard of Treasure's reputation for action games and requested to publish for them in the past, but it was not until Treasure was developing for a non-Sega platform that they sought Enix's cooperation. Mischief Makers was followed by Silhouette Mirage, which was initially released on the Saturn then ported to the PlayStation in 1998.

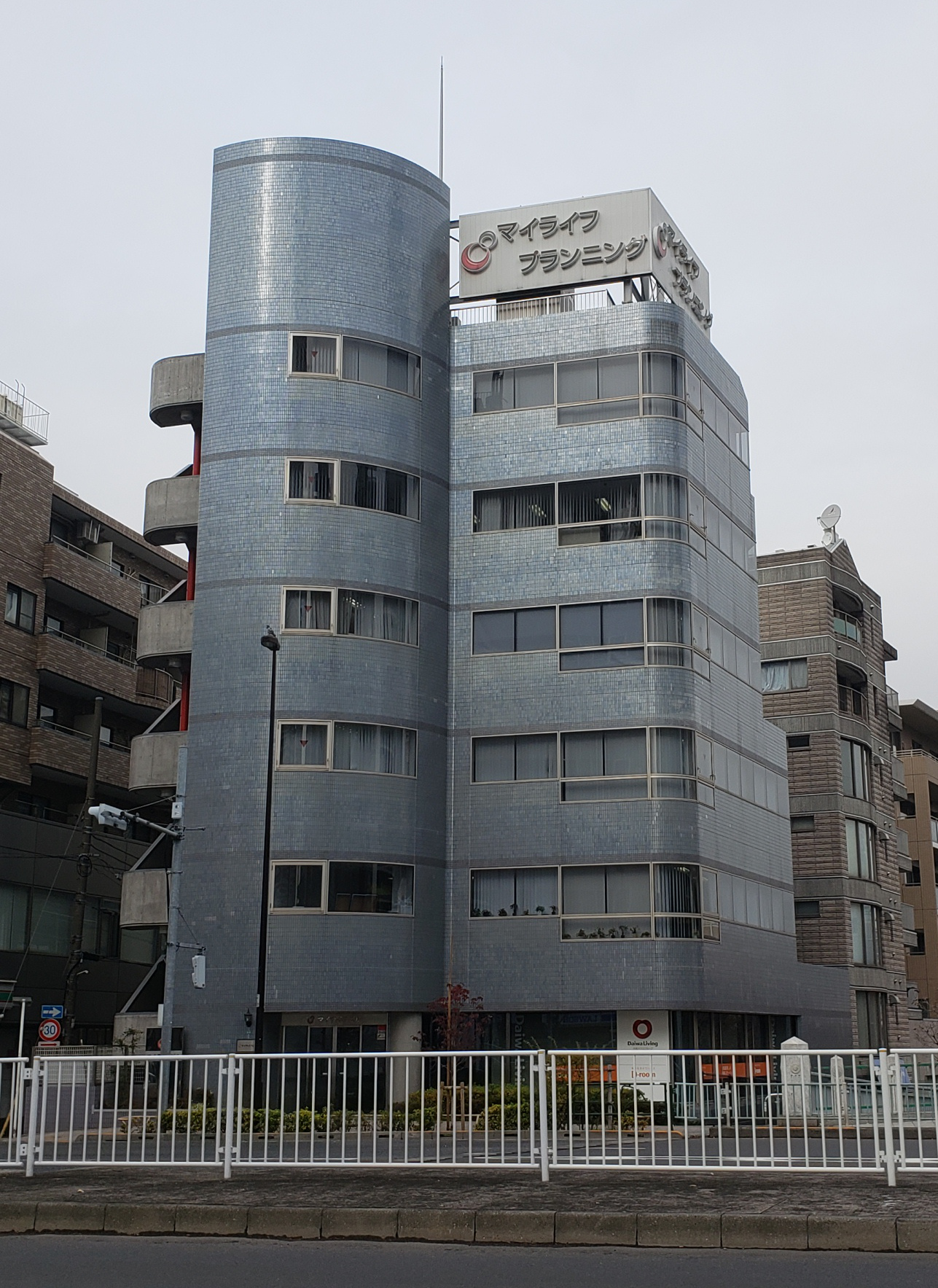
Treasure's headquarters in Nakano, Tokyo from the late 1990s (Note: Treasure moved their offices to the building sometime between 1997 and 1998. The company was still working out of Shinjuku in early 1997, but had moved to Nakano by August 1998 as evidenced by this building's image in Gamers' Republic that month.) to early 2010s (Note: Maegawa mentions still working at the address in a 2011 interview with Retro Gamer. Treasure's website updated the company's address in 2014.) (photographed in 2019)

In 1998, Treasure released its first arcade game, the shoot 'em up Radiant Silvergun. Treasure had been hesitant to develop an arcade game for years because of concerns with their commercial viability, but the staff felt Radiant Silvergun had potential and it was eager to develop it. The game was ported to the Saturn later that year. Enix published Treasure's next game for the PlayStation, fighting game Rakugaki Showtime (1999), but had to pull it from shelves shortly after release because of a lawsuit filed against them. This was followed by the multidirectional shooter Bangai-O (1999) which received a limited release on the Nintendo 64, but was later modified and re-released for the Dreamcast. By 1999, most of the founding Treasure staff were still with the company.

=== Transition to licensed games (2000s) ===
Treasure began the 2000s with some early troubles. Gun Beat, a racing game they were developing for Sega's NAOMI arcade platform, was canceled with little explanation. Also, Silpheed: The Lost Planet (2000) and Stretch Panic (2001) for the PlayStation 2 both weren't received very well. Despite these hiccups, Treasure did find success with Sin and Punishment (2000), a rail shooter co-developed with Nintendo for the Nintendo 64 and later released on the iQue in China. The game was not released in western territories but grew a cult following among import gamers. While Sin and Punishment was still in development, Treasure started development on a spiritual sequel to Radiant Silvergun titled Ikaruga (2001). The arcade shooter was co-developed with G.rev, and ported to the Dreamcast and saw a worldwide release on the GameCube.

Treasure next embarked on a series of licensed projects. Two of these were based on the Tiny Toon Adventures franchise, Tiny Toon Adventures: Buster's Bad Dream (2002) for the Game Boy Advance and the unreleased Tiny Toon Adventures: Defenders of the Universe for the PlayStation 2. Other licensed games during this period included Game Boy Advance games Hajime no Ippo: The Fighting! (2003) and Astro Boy: Omega Factor (2003), as well as GameCube games Wario World (2003) and Dragon Drive: D-Masters Shot (2003). Astro Boy: Omega Factor was co-developed with Hitmaker and was critically praised for returning to Treasure's classic side-scrolling action style that had been missing from its recent output. Their next game was Gradius V (2004) which like Ikaruga before it, was co-developed with G.rev. The companies worked under contract for Konami, and the game helped cement Treasure's return to critical successes following a slew of mediocre licensed games.

Treasure developed sequels on the Game Boy Advance for their earlier successes, Advance Guardian Heroes (2004) and Gunstar Super Heroes (2005). Treasure followed this with a series of licensed Bleach games for the Nintendo DS. Maegawa explained that his company experiences challenges in developing games based on licensed properties like Bleach, saying that the staff wants to be original but cannot detract too far from the source material and risk disappointing fans. By 2009, the company had 20-30 employees.

=== Output decline (2010s) ===
The number of employees at Treasure had dropped to 16 by 2011. In a 2011 interview, Maegawa explained that Treasure now uses middleware to develop games, no longer using custom programming to push the hardware to their maximum levels. The company was also putting an increased focus on rereleasing their back catalog as downloadable games on the Virtual Console, PlayStation Network, and Xbox Live. Treasure has not released any new games since 2014 apart from re-releases of games like Ikaruga.

=== 2020s ===
On June 19, 2022, its 30th anniversary, Treasure announced it was working on a "highly requested" game. Shortly afterwards, it re-released Radiant Silvergun for the Nintendo Switch. They had less than 10 staff by 2022.

== Staff and design philosophy ==
Treasure does not have a rigid hierarchy. Maegawa explained that Treasure operates differently from other companies by not assigning lead designers. While a project leader may create a project plan, most of the game design is done collaboratively between the programmers and artists. Most permanent employees and part-time contractors drift in and out of projects as required. Some individuals have been important figures in Treasure's history:

- Masato Maegawa – Founder, company president, and lead producer on all games. He was programmer for some of the company's Genesis games.
- Hideyuki Suganami – Programmer on Gunstar Heroes, Alien Soldier, Mischief Makers, and Sin and Punishment. Suganami has left the company but worked as a freelancer on Gunstar Super Heroes and Sin and Punishment: Star Successor.
- Hiroshi Iuchi – Director for Radiant Silvergun, Ikaruga, and Gradius V
- Mitsuru Yaida – Programmer for the Bangai-O games
- Koichi Kimura - Director and Artist for Dynamite Headdy, McDonald's Treasure Land Adventure, Stretch Panic, and Wario World
- Tetsuhiko Kikuchi – Frequent artist and character designer. Led development of Yu Yu Hakusho Makyō Tōitsusen, Guardian Heroes, Rakugaki Showtime and Tiny Toon Adventures: Defenders of the Universe.
- Norio Hanzawa – Frequent composer
- Yasushi Suzuki – Artist for Radiant Silvergun, Sin and Punishment, and Ikaruga

Treasure places emphasis on creating original games in the action, platform, and shooter genres. They do not have a preference on gaming platforms or 2D vs. 3D gameplay, preferring to choose the most suitable depending on the game they are designing. The company has never viewed sales as much of a concern. They would prefer making the games they want to make, and not what will more likely sell well. Maegawa has preferred to always keep the company small to keep an "independent-minded" mentality, and help the developers' personalities shine through their games.

They expressed disinterest in sequels early in their history, but became more open to it later. They pride themselves in creating original ideas and avoiding imitating other works or being associated with games already on the market. They have made games based on licensed properties to generate revenue to pursue original projects. Explaining the Treasure design philosophy, Maegawa said it "simply, to create the games we want to make" and "creating the things we love in the way we like." The company has generally employed around 20 to 30 people at any given time.

== Reputation ==
Treasure was one of the most celebrated developers of the 16-bit era and grew a cult following during the period. USgamer called them "one of Japan's pioneering indie developers" and explained the "sense of integrity" in their 1990s work that was not seen in other games of the era. Maximum: The Video Game Magazine called it "one of the most respected programming houses in the world" in 1996. Gamers' Republic agreed in 1998, writing: "Any action or platform gamer worth his salt recognizes Treasure as one of the finest development houses in the world." In 2005, 1UP.com called Treasure "one of Japan's most famous independent development houses [...] releasing some of the most finely crafted, creative, and offbeat action games the world has ever seen." Treasure did not have any large commercial successes, which influenced Retro Gamer to describe their output as "critically acclaimed yet commercially unsuccessful." Because of the loyal fan base but low sales, prices of Treasure games such as Rakugaki Showtime and Radiant Silvergun have climbed on the secondary market.

The company established a signature style early on that became consistent across their work. Their first game, Gunstar Heroes, established what 1UP.com called Treasure's key themes: "creativity, weirdness, and a tendency toward completely absurd levels of action." Wireframe called their style "fast, aggressive [...] featuring bold graphics and surreal dashes of humour." Retro Gamer wrote that they have "consistently excellent art direction" and are renowned for their "action-packed" and "explosive" gameplay. They explained that Treasure is "at the very cutting edge of artistic freedom, forging its own very particular path and creating a softography guided by nothing other than the whims of the creators." The company is known for taking risks within established genres, borrowing conventional ideas and adding their own creative touches to create something new and innovative. They became recognized for their prowess in 2D game design, with Gamers' Republic calling their output "the finest 2D platform games on the planet." Treasure is also known for technological innovation; several of their games pushed the hardware to their limits.

== Games developed ==
Year	Title	Original platform(s)	Co-developer
1993	Gunstar Heroes	Sega Genesis, Game Gear	M2 (GG)
1993	McDonald's Treasure Land Adventure	Sega Genesis	—N/a
1994	Dynamite Headdy	Sega Genesis, Game Gear, Master System	Minato Giken (GG / MS)
1994	Yu Yu Hakusho Makyō Tōitsusen	Sega Genesis	—N/a
1995	Alien Soldier	Sega Genesis	—N/a
1995	Light Crusader	Sega Genesis	—N/a
1996	Guardian Heroes	Sega Saturn	—N/a
1997	Mischief Makers	Nintendo 64	—N/a
1997	Silhouette Mirage	Sega Saturn, PlayStation	—N/a
1998	Radiant Silvergun	Arcade, Sega Saturn	—N/a
1999	Rakugaki Showtime	PlayStation	—N/a
1999	Bangai-O	Nintendo 64, Dreamcast	—N/a
2000	Sin and Punishment	Nintendo 64, iQue Player	Nintendo R&D1
2000	Silpheed: The Lost Planet	PlayStation 2	Game Arts
2001	Stretch Panic (Freak Out)	PlayStation 2	—N/a
2001	Ikaruga	Arcade, Dreamcast, GameCube	G.rev
2002	Tiny Toon Adventures: Buster's Bad Dream	Game Boy Advance	—N/a
2003	Hajime no Ippo: The Fighting!	Game Boy Advance	—N/a
2003	Wario World	GameCube	—N/a
2003	Dragon Drive: D-Masters Shot	GameCube	—N/a
2003	Astro Boy: Omega Factor	Game Boy Advance	Hitmaker
2004	Gradius V	PlayStation 2	G.rev
2004	Advance Guardian Heroes	Game Boy Advance	—N/a
2005	Gunstar Super Heroes	Game Boy Advance	—N/a
2006	Bleach: The Blade of Fate	Nintendo DS	—N/a
2006	Sega Ages 2500 Vol. 25: Gunstar Heroes Treasure Box	PlayStation 2	M2
2007	Bleach: Dark Souls	Nintendo DS	—N/a
2008	Bangai-O Spirits	Nintendo DS	—N/a
2008	Bleach: Versus Crusade	Wii	—N/a
2009	Sin & Punishment: Star Successor	Wii	Nintendo SPD
2011	Bangai-O HD: Missile Fury	Xbox 360	—N/a
2013	Gaist Crusher	Nintendo 3DS	—N/a
2014	Gaist Crusher God	Nintendo 3DS	—N/a

=== Cancelled games ===
- Gun Beat (Arcade, cancelled 2000)
- Tiny Toon Adventures: Defenders of the Universe (GameCube and PlayStation 2, cancelled 2002)
