= Cotton Rock n' Roll: Superlative Night Dreams =

2021 video game

Cotton Rock 'n' Roll: Superlative Night Dreams
- Developers: Success; Studio Saizensen exA-Arcadia (Arcade)
- Publishers: Arcade: JP: Success; WW: exA-Arcadia; Switch, PlayStation 4: JP: Success; WW: ININ Games
- Directors: Toshinobu Kondo; Rico Trask
- Producer: Shinya Nagatomo
- Designer: Koji Nakajima
- Programmers: Soichiro Takahashi; Toshio Obata
- Artist: Amika Minato
- Writers: Koji Nakajima; Toshinobu Kondo
- Composers: Keisuke Hayase; Kenichi Arakawa
- Series: Cotton
- Platforms: Arcade, Nintendo Switch, PlayStation 4, Microsoft Windows
- Release: Arcade: JP: September 27, 2021; WW: February 10, 2022; Switch, PlayStation 4: JP: December 23, 2021; WW: May 20, 2022; Windows: WW: January 6, 2023
- Genre: Scrolling shooter
- Modes: Single-player, multiplayer
- Arcade system: ALL.Net P-ras MULTI Ver.3 (Japan) exA-Arcadia (Worldwide)

Cotton Rock 'n' Roll: Superlative Night Dreams (Note: Known as Cotton Rock 'n' Roll: Superlative Night Dreams (Japanese: コットンロックンロール: SUPERLATIVE NIGHT DREAMS, Hepburn: Kotton Rokkun Rōru: Superlative Night Dreams) in Japan and on PC) is a scrolling shooter video game originally released in Japanese arcades in 2021 and in global arcades in February 2022. It was ported to Nintendo Switch and PlayStation 4 under the title "Cotton Fantasy" in the west. A PC version was later released, reverting to the original Rock 'n' Roll title.

The sixth installment in the Cotton franchise, it is a follow-up to Rainbow Cotton and the first main entry of the series in over 20 years. In the game, players assume the role of young witch Cotton or any of the six additional characters, each one having their own gameplay style, on a quest to defeat enemies and bosses to retrieve "Willow" candy for Fairyland from Tacoot, Game's Antagonist. The arcade release used the ALL.Net P-ras MULTI Ver.3 hardware in Japan and exA-Arcadia outside of Japan.

Cotton Rock 'n' Roll was co-developed by Success and Studio Saizensen, known for their work on the Umihara Kawase series, being directed by Toshinobu Kondo and produced by Shinya Nagatomo. Nagatomo felt it was important to revive the Cotton franchise, as no one at Success were making games with the IP, and submitted a proposal for its revival during a call for projects within the company. The team sought to appeal to both casual and hardcore players and maintain the series' essence. Nagatomo wanted to include gameplay systems from past shoot 'em ups by Success via guest characters, while characters from past Studio Saizensen releases were also included, to portray it as an all-star festival. It garnered generally favorable reception from critics.

A sequel was announced by Success during the 2023 Tokyo Game Show. Titled Cotton Rock with You: Oriental Night Dreams, the game is scheduled to be released in Japan on August 6, 2026.

== Gameplay ==
Gameplay screenshot of the Nintendo Switch version.

Cotton Rock 'n' Roll: Superlative Night Dreams is a scrolling shooter game where players assume role of young witch Cotton accompanied by the fairy Silk, traveling through eight increasingly difficult stages in a fantasy dream-like world, defeating enemies and bosses on a quest to retrieve "Willow" candy for Fairyland from the villainess Tacoot. The game incorporates role-playing game-esque mechanics, as players blasts a variety of enemies and avoid being shot while collecting crystal pick-ups to gain experience points (EXP) and level up Cotton's maximum firepower. Shooting these crystals dropped by enemies before being picked up changes their color, and each one allows Cotton to cast elemental magic spells. Cotton can also use bombs to obliterate on-screen enemies and nullify enemy bullets.

Cotton Rock 'n' Roll offers seven playable characters, each one with their own gameplay style: Cotton plays like her previous appearances since the original Cotton. Her rival Appli ke Pumpkin (introduced in Cotton 2/Boomerang) can catch and throw enemies. Saiba Ria (an anthropomorphized ship from Psyvariar) can power up via a "buzz" system by grazing enemies and bullets. Fine (an anthropomorphized ship from Sanvein) introduces a timer, which must be recharged if she takes any enemy hit or before it runs out by collecting crystals. Umihara Kawase (main character from the Umihara Kawase series) can cast her fishing rod to grab enemies and shoot them out. Luffee (a character from Doki Doki Poyacchio) shoots charged laser attacks. Tacoot (an unlockable) employs a cosmic rod that can be positioned and sent to act as an option.

Besides the main stages, there are six secret stages that can be accessed depending on the player's overall performance. After a stage is completed, a pseudo-3D rail bonus stage reminiscent of Panorama Cotton and Rainbow Cotton is played, where players must collect tea cups for extra points. Depending on the chosen character, players lose a live after getting hit by enemies or the timer runs out. The game employs a respawn system where a downed player will start off immediately at the location they died at, with a penalty of decreasing the character's firepower. Once all lives are lost, the game is over but players can keep playing by inserting more credits into the arcade machine to continue playing (arcade version) or using a limited number of continues (home versions).

== Development ==
Cotton Rock 'n' Roll: Superlative Night Dreams was co-developed by Success and Studio Saizensen, known for their work on the Umihara Kawase series, as well as Code of Princess and Blade Strangers. It was directed by Toshinobu Kondo and produced by Shinya Nagatomo, with character designs by Amika Minato, and music by Keisuke "Hagane" Hayase and Kenichi "Tomazo" Arakawa. Minato had worked as character designer on Umihara Kawase BaZooKa!, while Arakawa's past works include Rusty (1993) and Game Tengoku. Kondo also co-wrote the game's scenario alongside Koji Nakajima, who acted as co-designer with other staff members that collaborated in its development, including co-programmers Soichiro Takahashi and Toshio Obata. Both Kondo and Nagatomo recounted the project's history and development process in interviews. Due to his liking of horizontal shooters and no one at Success making games with the IP, Nagatomo felt it was important to revive the Cotton series and submitted a proposal for its revival during a call for projects within the company, which was eventually greenlit after being evaluated and well received. Kondo stated that the positive reception of Cotton Reboot! was an inspiration for the project.

It's an all-star game with not only characters from other games, but also new systems from other Success games

— Producer Shinya Nagatomo gave Cotton Fantasy its raison d'être when describing how each character alters its gameplay mechanics.

Prior to this, a third entry in the Cotton series, titled Cotton 3: Magical Century Legend, entered pre-production 23 years ago at Success but its existence was not confirmed until a game design document related to the project was discovered and revealed in a 2021 post via Twitter by composer Tetsuro "WASi303" Sato. Being a new entry in the franchise, the team sought to appeal both casual and hardcore players. To keep audiences playing, the overall difficulty level was reduced compared to past games. Cotton Rock 'n' Roll is modernized, but stays close to the original formula. Nagatomo wanted to include all the original gameplay systems from past shoot 'em ups by Success such as Psyvariar and Sanvein via guest characters but turned into girls to match the series' world, in order to extend the game's lifespan and make it look like an all-star game festival. Characters from past Studio Saizensen releases were included, as they were also in charge of development and Nagatomo wanted to return the favor with the inclusion of Cotton as a guest character in Umihara Kawase Fresh!, however arrangements were made to make them fly and shoot.

Kondo was responsible for changing Cotton's hair design from past titles, and he revealed that the staff was divided and put in charge of each playable character in order to adjust the game's interactive system, but remarked that it proved to be a laborious endeavor. Nagatomo stated that the team had to choose between introducing additional features or completely revamp the gameplay system, with the latter being selected, but Kondo commented that many ideas were ultimately scrapped during development. Success and Studio Saizensen wanted to create a game that reflected the detailed worlds from earlier entries in the series. Both Kondo and Nagatomo explained that after Cotton 2: Magical Night Dreams, Success reflected that background graphics were the most time-consuming and expensive aspect of making shoot 'em ups, with the team feeling 3D was the only option given the direction of Cotton Rock 'n' Roll. The team also included 3D bonus stages similar to Panorama Cotton and Rainbow Cotton as recognition of the series' history. Kondo invested effort in creating storyboards, as this process involved trial and error, paying particular attention to the manga-like expressions.

== Release ==
The first hint of the game's existence was given in 2019 at a hands-on event for Umihara Kawase BaZooKa! by Studio Saizensen director Toshinobu Kondo, who stated that it was planned for a 2021 release in Japan. Success reaffirmed that the new entry would launch in 2021 to commemorate the series' 30th anniversary. The company later announced it would be released under the title Cotton Rock 'n' Roll for arcades, Nintendo Switch, PC and PlayStation 4. The arcade version was first playable during a location test in Japan on September 10 at three stores and later released on September 27, running on the ALL.Net P-ras MULTI Ver.3 board. It is the first main installment in the series to be released in over 20 years.

On September 24, 2021, arcade manufacturer exA-Arcadia announced a partnership with Success to bring the game on their exA-Arcadia arcade platform exclusively in western territories, being distributed worldwide on February 10, 2022. Ported by Team EXA-AM1, an internal gaming division of exA-Arcadia, this version contains features exclusive to the platform such as simultaneous two-player support and an arrange mode. Both the Switch and PS4 versions were published simultaneously in Japan by Success on December 23, 2021. ININ Games later announced they would publish the console versions physically (via Strictly Limited Games) and digitally in the west as Cotton Rock 'n' Roll, initially planned for a winter 2021 launch, before being delayed to a spring 2022 and eventually released on May 20. The PC version was released on January 6, 2023. On April 27, a music album containing the game's soundtrack was published in Japan by City Connection's Clarice Disk label.

== Reception ==
Reception

Aggregate score
Aggregator	Score
Metacritic	NS: 78/100; PS4: 80/100

Review scores
Publication	Score
Famitsu	29/40
Hardcore Gamer	4/5
Nintendo Life	8/10
Push Square	7/10
TouchArcade	4/5
Anime News Network	B+

Cotton Rock 'n' Roll: Superlative Night Dreams received "generally favorable" reviews, according to review aggregator site Metacritic. Famitsu's four writers gave both the Switch and PS4 versions an overall positive look. Nintendo Life's Will Freeman praised the game's variety, depth for players of any skill level, and energetic pacing. However, Freeman criticized its polygonal artstyle, mismatched character systems with certain stages, and for being occasionally "too visually busy". Hardcore Gamer's Jeremy Peeples commended its music and audio design, though he stated that both the visuals and core gameplay felt like an extension of Cotton Reboot!, while the behind-the-back playstyle being relegated to special stages was seen as a negative point. Nevertheless, Peeples regarded it as "an excellent side-scrolling shooter and one with a lot of visual and audio variety."

TouchArcade's Shaun Musgrave highlighted the title's gameplay strategies of each playable character, playability, challenging boss encounters and longevity. Anime News Network's Todd Ciolek agreed with Musgrave, stating that its varied character roster is the game's biggest strength and an inventive approach to shoot 'em ups, due to each one bringing opportunity for experimentation. Ciolek complimented the anime-style presentation, but concurred with Peeples and expressed disappointment towards the 3D rail segments for not being full-fledged shooter stages. He also drew criticism directed to the unlimited continue system and confusing graphics. Push Square's Jamie O'Neill reviewed the PS4 version, lauding its visually diverse 2.5D stages, soundtrack, unlockables, and the characters' varied mechanics. Nevertheless, O'Neill saw some aspects such as the lack of extra modes and multiplayer as negatives.
