= Trouble Witches =

- Developer: Rocket-Engine
- Platforms: Windows; Arcade; Xbox 360; PlayStation 4; Nintendo Switch; PlayStation 5
- Release: 17 August 2007: Windows; JP: 17 August 2007 Arcade; JP: 1 July 2009 Xbox 360; WW: 27 April 2011 Origin Windows; WW: 21 November 2016 Final PS4, Switch; JP: 6 July 2023; WW: 15 December 2025 PS5; JP: 23 October 2025
- Genre: Shoot 'em up
- Modes: Single-player, multiplayer

Trouble Witches (Note: Japanese: トラブル☆ウィッチーズ) is a horizontally scrolling shooter developed by Rocket-Engine. It was released on 17 August 2007 as a doujin soft. It has been ported as a commercial product to arcade boards, Xbox 360, PlayStation 4, and Nintendo Switch.

== Gameplay ==
Trouble Witches is a horizontally scrolling shooter starring the titular witches. Each player character tames a magical familiar that can create a barrier that slows down bullets within its radius for a limited amount of time. The barrier functions as a score-multiplying mechanism, as destroying enemies whose bullets are trapped inside the barrier transform said bullets into coins that reward score points. The coins can be spent at shops in the levels, which sell Magic Cards with special effects and other enhancements.

There are six stages in the original Trouble Witches.

== Release ==
The original version was self-published in Japan in 2007 by Rocket-Engine, also known as Studio Siesta. An arcade version was released on 1 July 2009.

A Xbox 360 version titled Trouble Witches Neo! was published in 2011 by SNK Playmore as a Xbox Live Arcade title. It was the first version to be localized in English. An updated Windows version titled Trouble Witches Origin was released via Steam on 21 November 2016.

Another revision titled Trouble Witches Final! Episode 01: Daughters of Amalgam was announced as part of the 2022 Tokyo Game Show lineup. It added two new playable characters and Magic Cards. The game was released in Japan on 6 July 2023 for PlayStation 4 and Nintendo Switch. In the western regions, it was published by ININ Games on 15 December 2025.

A PlayStation 5 version, titled Trouble Witches Final! Last End! Episode 01: Daughters of Amalgam, was released on 23 October 2025 in Japan.

== Legacy ==
Rocket-Engine later partnered with Success for the Cotton shoot 'em up series, having created Cotton Reboot (2021) and Cotton Reboot! High Tension! (2025). The titular character Cotton made appearance as a downloadable content playable character in Trouble Witches Origin and Trouble Witches Final!.
