= Rainbow Cotton =

2000 video game

- Developer: Success
- Publisher: Success
- Producer: Takato Yoshinari
- Designer: Mizuho Sasa
- Programmers: Hiroki Honda; Hiromi Yoshizawa; Mizuho Sasa
- Artists: Hironobu Terakado; Manabu Kenmochi; Yusuke Nemoto
- Composer: Kenichi Hirata
- Series: Cotton
- Platforms: Dreamcast; Nintendo Switch; PlayStation 4 PlayStation 5 Windows; Xbox One
- Release: Dreamcast: JP: January 20, 2000; Nintendo Switch, PlayStation 4, PlayStation 5, Xbox One, Windows: WW: May 9, 2024
- Genre: Rail shooter
- Mode: Single-player

Rainbow Cotton (Note: Japanese: レインボーコットン, Hepburn: Reinbō Kotton) is a 2000 rail shooter video game developed and published by Success exclusively for the Dreamcast. The fifth installment in the Cotton franchise, it is a follow-up to Panorama Cotton (1994) and the first 3D entry in the series. In the game, players assume the role of the titular young witch who, alongside her fairy companion Silk, sets out on her broomstick on a quest to defeat the evil demon Tweed and retrieve a stolen Willow candy from York Country. Its gameplay is similar to Panorama Cotton, consisting of shooting mixed with role-playing game elements while flying through 3D environments on a predetermined track.

The staff of Rainbow Cotton mostly consisted of new members at Success, with development headed by Takato Yoshinari. The game was met with mixed to negative reception from critics, most of which reviewed it as a import title; reviewers unanimously praised the colorful 3D visual presentation but drew comparison with both Space Harrier and Panzer Dragoon due to its gameplay, which was heavily criticized by many for the frustrating controls. A remake was released on May 9, 2024 on PlayStation 4, PlayStation 5, Nintendo Switch, Xbox One, and Windows, marking the game's first release outside of Japan.

== Gameplay ==
Gameplay screenshot.

Rainbow Cotton is a 3D rail shooter game reminiscent of Space Harrier and Panzer Dragoon where players assume the role of young witch Cotton alongside her fairy companion Silk. The plot involves an evil demon called Tweed, whose legion of followers steals a legendary Willow candy from York Country. In response, the queen of Fairy Country calls upon Silk, who drafts Cotton with retrieving the stolen candy. The game features gameplay similar to Panorama Cotton; the player flies through each stage, destroying constantly-moving formations of enemies and avoiding their projectiles and stage obstacles. There are five stages total, which become progressively more difficult as the player progresses. Stages include towns and castles that take place across different environments. Each stage also has a massive boss that must be defeated in order to advance further.

During gameplay, players must blast various monsters and avoid being shot while collecting crystal power-ups to enhance Cotton's firepower and unleash powerful magic spells on enemies, in addition of bombs capable of obliterating enemies and hearts to restore energy. Rainbow Cotton also incorporates some role playing game elements as with previous Cotton entries, as players are able to level up their attack multiple times by collecting crystals dropped by enemies. There are also chests, doors and other bonus locations for additional items. Players can rescue captured fairies from enemies, acting as "options" after being freed. Players also have a full, 360-degree field of view and can look left, right, forward, and behind Cotton. A new addition is a branching level system, in which stages change depending on the path taken by players. The game also introduces two energy gauges, one for Cotton and one for her broom; players can fly when the broom has energy but if it runs out, Cotton travels on-foot while Silk will carry her during stages set in the sky. The game is over once Cotton's energy runs out but players can keep playing by using a limited number of continues.

== Development and release ==
Rainbow Cotton was mostly created by members at Success who were new to video game development at the time although with a few members, like composer Kenichi Hirata, that were already familiar with the Cotton series. Production was headed by Takato Yoshinari, the founder of Success. Mizuho Sasa, main programmer behind Cotton 100%, returned as planner and acted as co-programmer alongside Hiroki Honda and Hiromi Yoshizawa. Visual scenes were illustrated by Manabu Kenmochi, while Hironobu Terakado and Yusuke Nemoto served as co-designers. Other people also collaborated in its creation process, such as sound designer Tetsuro "WASi303" Sato. During development, the game was made as a follow-up to Panorama Cotton and as such, was tentatively referred to as Panorama Cotton 2.

Dreamcast development kits were difficult to obtain at the start of production, due to the number of units available and the cost of them at the time, so the team was unable to get a development kit for a while. Because of that, Windows CE was used to get a head start on development, however, it was developed using typical Dreamcast development software in the end. The game was made using development methods of "yesteryear", such as lunch breaks in the middle of the night and staff having to live at the office for months at a time. The Silk fairy options having full conversations to each other was a feature of the game the team was proud of, and they also made lines for them as development went on. They also had special programming that made sure that their conversations flowed correctly, and that they did not talk over each other. However, Sasa retrospectively regrets making the game as difficult as it was, due to the severe bullet hit projectories of the game, and also wanted to add more to the game.

The game was first announced as Panorama Cotton 2 but its final title, Rainbow Cotton, was revealed by Success in the October 1999 issue of the Japanese Dreamcast Magazine. It was first slated for launch on December 23, 1999, with early previews showcasing a different HUD compared to the final version. However, the game was later delayed by a month, with the final release date being January 20, 2000. Although the title was not officially released outside Japan, an English fan translation was released in 2021. On September 13, 2023, it was announced that a remake with an official English localization and refinements will be releasing on PlayStation 5, PlayStation 4, Xbox One, Nintendo Switch and Windows on May 9, 2024.

== Reception ==
Reception

Review scores
Publication	Score
Consoles +	75%
Famitsu	20/40
GameSpot	4.8/10
IGN	6.0/10
Joypad	4/10
Mega Fun	61%
Video Games (DE)	60/100
Dreamcast Magazine (JP)	4.66/10
Dreamcast Magazine (UK)	69%
Dreamzone	78%
Gamers' Republic	C−

Rainbow Cotton was met with mixed to negative reception from critics, most of which reviewed it as an import title. Fan reception was negative; Readers of the Japanese Dreamcast Magazine voted to give the game a 3.6716 out of 10 score, ranking at the number 418 spot, indicating a low following. Possibly in response to this, designer Yusuke Nemoto retrospectively apologized for the game.

Consoles +' Maxime Roure criticized the compressed presentation of anime cutscenes and automatic centering of Cotton herself, but praised the colorful and animated visuals, audio and double gauge mechanic, regarding it to be "A nice and beautiful game, which suffers from its passage to 3D because of a limited playability." Likewise, GameSpot's Peter Bartholow commended the audiovisual presentation but heavily criticized the controls for being unrefined and frustrating, the automatic centering of Cotton and large size of her in-game model that limits the playfield, as well as poor animation and pacing of story cutscenes, stating that "Rainbow Cotton's core gameplay is so flawed that it leaves the overall experience unsalvageable. Even the most devoted Cotton fans will have a hard time embracing this most recent incarnation."

In a similar manner as Roure and Bartholow, IGN's Anoop Gantayat criticized the controls for being frustrating and automatic centering system, issues with collision detection, overall length of each stage and obstruction of view due to the size of foreground elements but praised the cartoon-style presentation and sound. Video Games' Christian Daxer commended the detailed visuals, level design and Japanese-style music but criticized issues with the camera and clipping.

Dreamzone's Alexandre Faure also commended the colorful pastel-esque visuals for being reminiscent of Cotton Boomerang on Sega Saturn, speed and anime-style audio design. However, Faure felt mixed in regards to the playability and criticized issues with collision detection and repetitive action. Gamers' Republic's Michael Hobbs criticized the gameplay for being tepid due to the size of Cotton herself for limiting the playfield and lack of autofire mechanism but, like Faure, praised the colorful graphics and boss fights. Hardcore Gaming 101's Kurt Kalata regarded Rainbow Cotton as a "spectacular failure".
