= Saori Seto =

Japanese voice actress

- 世戸 さおり
- Born: September 3, 1982 (age 44); Saitama, Saitama Prefecture, Japan
- Occupation: Voice actress
- Years active: 2005–present
- Agent: Watanabe Productions
- Children: 2

Saori Seto (世戸 さおり, Seto Saori; born September 3, 1982) is a Japanese voice actress from Saitama, Saitama Prefecture, Japan. Formerly affiliated with Mausu Promotion until 2014, she is currently affiliated with Watanabe Productions.

== Filmography ==
=== Anime ===
2006

- Fighting Beauty Wulong (Rika)
- Muteki Kanban Musume (Chiemi)

2007

- Emma: A Victorian Romance Second Act (Francis, Ida, Williams Jones (young))
- Heroic Age (Hestia)
- Tokyo Majin (Sera Rikudō)

2008

- Itazura na Kiss (Akiko Nagasawa, Ayako Matsumoto, Pūta)
- Kanokon (Yūki Sasamori)
- Net Ghost PiPoPa (Yūko Akikawa, Chizuru Honjō)
- Nodame Cantabile: Paris (Celine)

2009

- Canaan (Chiaki Iso)
- Fresh Pretty Cure! (Reika)
- Yumeiro Patissiere (Kyōko Amano)

2010

- Fairy Tail (Evergreen)
- Kekkaishi (Kyoko)
- Strike Witches 2 (Mio Sakamoto)
- Yumeiro Patissiere SP Professional (Kyōko Amano)

2011

- Infinite Stratos (Kaoruko Mayuzumi)

2012

- High School DxD (Grayfia Lucifuge)

2013

- Tanken Driland (Cherry)
- High School DxD New (Grayfia Lucifuge)
- Infinite Stratos 2 (Kaoruko Mayuzumi)
- Photo Kano (Misa Kitagawa)

2014

- Girl Friend Beta (Tatsuru Iwamoto)

2015

- Fafner in the Azure: EXODUS (Mai Dōma)
- High School DxD BorN (Grayfia Lucifuge)

2019

- Strike Witches 501st Unit, Taking Off! (Mio Sakamoto)

=== OVA ===
- Fairy Tail (Evergreen)
- High School DxD (Grayfia Lucifuge)
- Kanokon: The Great Midsummer Carnival (Yūki Sasamori)
- Strike Witches: Operation Victory Arrow (Mio Sakamoto)
- Final Fantasy XV: Episode Ardyn Prologue (Aera Mils Fleuret)

=== Theatrical animation ===
- Fairy Tail the Movie: The Phoenix Priestess (Evergreen)
- Strike Witches (Mio Sakamoto)

=== Video games ===
2006

- Izuna: Legend of the Unemployed Ninja (Izuna)

2007

- Izuna 2: The Unemployed Ninja Returns (Izuna)

2008

- Kane & Lynch: Dead Men (Yoko)
- Majin Tantei Nōgami Neuro: Neuro to Yako no Bishoku Sanmai Suiritsuki Gourmet and Mystery (Yukiko Nakata)
- Tom Clancy's Rainbow Six: Vegas 2 (Shalon Judd)

2010

- Ace Combat: Joint Assault (Sarah Anderson)

2011

- Uncharted: Golden Abyss (Marisa Chase)
- Catherine (Lindsay Uspenski)

2012

- Resident Evil: Revelations (Rachel Foley)
- Fire Emblem Awakening (Severa, Anna)
- Photo Kano (Misa Kitagawa)

2014

- Girl Friend Beta (Tatsuru Iwamoto)
- Hyrule Warriors (Princess Zelda, Sheik)
- Until Dawn (Hannah Washington, Beth Washington)

2015

- Fire Emblem Fates (Selena, Anna)
- Genei Ibun Roku ♯FE (Hee Ho Mart STAFF / Masked Hee Ho Mart STAFF)
- Until Dawn (Beth, Hannah)
- Fallout 4 (Piper Wright)

2016

- Hyrule Warriors Legends (Princess Zelda, Sheik)

2017

- Fire Emblem Heroes (Anna, Severa, Ewan)

2019

- Final Fantasy XV: Episode Ardyn (Aera Mils Fleuret)
- Starlink: Battle for Atlas (Razor Lemay)
- Catherine: Full Body (Lindsay Uspenski)
- Fire Emblem: Three Houses (Anna)

2023

- Fire Emblem Engage (Anna)

=== Dubbing ===
==== Live-action ====
- 24 (Evelyn Martin, Nicole)
- 48 Hrs. (Elaine Marshall)
- Aliens in the Attic (Bethany Pearson (Ashley Tisdale))
- Ballet Shoes (Petrova Fossil)
- Bones (Alyssa Howland)
- Butterfly on a Wheel (Sophie)
- Camp Rock (Mitchie Torres)
- Camp Rock 2: The Final Jam (Mitchie Torres)
- Disaster Movie (The Beautiful Assassin)
- Eagle Eye (Becky)
- The Final Destination (Janet Cunningham (Haley Webb))
- Flight 7500 (Liz Lewis)
- The Flock (Harriet Wells)
- Frankenstein (William Frankenstein)
- Gilmore Girls (Louise Grant)
- Grown Ups 2 (Roxanne Feder (Salma Hayek))
- The Grudge 2 (Lacey)
- Heroes (Monica Dawson)
- Hobo with a Shotgun (Abby)
- I, Frankenstein (Terra Wade)
- The Illusionist (Duchess Sophie von Teschen)
- The Keeper (Nikita Wells)
- Kidnap and Ransom (Florence Holland)
- Lightspeed (Beth Baker)
- Medium (Mandy Sutton)
- Murdoch Mysteries (Dr. Julia Ogden)
- Numb3rs (Megan Reeves)
- Once Upon a Time (Ariel)
- Partners in Crime (Prudence "Tuppence" Beresford)
- Perfume: The Story of a Murderer (Laura Richis)
- Princess Protection Program (Princess Rosalinda/Rosie Gonzalez)
- Private Practice (Maya Bennett)
- Resurrection (Dr. Maggie Langston)
- The Returned (Rowan Blackshaw)
- Savages (Ophelia "O" Sage)
- Slayer (Dr. Laurie Williams)
- Sonny with a Chance (Allison "Sonny" Munroe)
- Step Brothers (Pam Gringe)
- Suits (Rachel Zane)
- Vantage Point (Grace Riggs)
- Warrior (Tess Conlon (Jennifer Morrison))
- Whitechapel (Lizzie Pepper)

==== Animation ====
- The Spectacular Spider-Man (Mary Jane Watson)
- X-Men: The Animated Series (Toon Disney Version) (Jubilee)
- X-Men '97 (Jubilee)
