= Castrol Honda VTR =

2001 video game

- Developers: Interactive Entertainment Ltd. Bubble Boy
- Publishers: EU: Midas Interactive Entertainment; JP: Success
- Series: Castrol HONDA Superbike
- Platform: PlayStation
- Release: EU: February 9, 2001; JP: October 25, 2001
- Genre: Racing
- Modes: Single-player; Multiplayer

Castrol HONDA -World Superbike Team- VTR (short: Castrol HONDA VTR) is a licensed motorcycle racing game, co-developed by Interactive Entertainment Ltd. and Bubble Boy and released in Europe and Japan for PlayStation. The game features the Honda VTR1000 SP-1 and the riders Aaron Slight and Colin Edwards of the 2000 Superbike World Championship season.

== Gameplay ==
The player controls a motorcyclist (default names are A.Slight and C.Edwards) in races on various international race tracks. Game modes are "Single Race" (practice a single course), "Championship" (race the whole season), "2 Player Race" (splitscreen against human player on a single course) and "2 Player Championship" (splitscreen against human player of the whole season). The field consists of 24 riders including human participants, however, because of the limitations of PlayStation hardware, a maximum of seven AI riders are viewed simultaneously. Game options include "Difficulty" (Novice, Amateur, Professional), "Length of race" (3, 5, 10 laps or "full race" of 100 km). Under "Skill Tests" (Amateur, Professional), steering assistance, braking assistance and damage can be activated. In the bike setup, gearbox (automatic or manual), gear ratios and tyres can be modified. The game features some graphical special effects like sun lens flares, earth trails when driving on grass and metallic glare effects on the bikes in replay mode.

== Sequels and Spin-offs ==
There are four games in the Castrol HONDA Superbike series of which each one was produced by Interactive Entertainment Ltd:

- Castrol HONDA SuperBike World Champions (1998 for PC)
- Castrol HONDA -World Superbike Team- Superbike Racing (1999 for PlayStation)
- Castrol HONDA -World Superbike Team- Superbike 2000 (1999 for PC)
- Castrol HONDA -World Superbike Team- VTR (2001 for PlayStation)
