= Iduna =

Iduna may refer to:

- One of several modern anglicizations of the name of the Norse goddess Iðunn
- 176 Iduna, an asteroid named after the goddess
- Iduna (bird), a genus of tree warblers
- Iduna (literature society)
- Iduna, Wisconsin, an unincorporated community, United States
- Iduna language, spoken in Papua New Guinea
- The journal of the Swedish Geatish Society
- Iduna, a character from Disney's animated films of Frozen

== See also ==
- Izuna (disambiguation)
