= Izuna =

Izuna may refer to:

- The Japanese name for the least weasel and its subspecies
- Mount Izuna in Japan
- The Izuna Shugen, a cult which originated on this mountain, which worships a god in the form of a tengu named Izuna Gongen
- A fox-sorcery practice which is part of this cult, which utilizes creatures such as the kuda-gitsune
- Izuna: Legend of the Unemployed Ninja, a Nintendo DS game
  - Izuna 2: The Unemployed Ninja Returns, sequel to the above game
- Izuna, a character from the Guilty Gear series of video games
- Izuna Uchiha, the deceased younger brother of Madara Uchiha from Naruto
- Izuna Hatsuse, an 8 year old purple haired Werebeast girl from No Game No Life
- Izuna Kuda, an 15 year old student from Blue Archive
