= Guardian Force (video game) =

1998 video game

- Developer: Success (Note: Saturn Tribute version by City Connection)
- Publisher: Nihon System (Note: Saturn Tribute version was published by City Connection and H2 Interactive)
- Directors: Kazutoshi Yashiki; Taku Ishigouoka
- Producer: Takato Yoshinari
- Designer: Kazutoshi Yashiki
- Programmers: Masaru Hatsuyama; Yūichi Horiguchi; Masato Taniguchi; Yūichiro Sato; Yukio Ushigome; Tomohide Ooshiro
- Artists: Kazutoshi Yashiki; Takeshi Takahashi; Taku Ishigouoka; Yusuke Nemoto
- Composers: Kenichi Hirata; Misako Tago
- Platforms: Arcade, Sega Saturn, Nintendo Switch, PlayStation 4, Microsoft Windows
- Release: May 1998: Arcade; JP: May 1998 Saturn; JP: August 6, 1998 Switch; WW: September 30, 2021; NZ: October 1, 2021 PS4; NZ: September 29, 2021; WW: September 30, 2021 Windows; WW: February 9, 2022
- Genre: Scrolling shooter
- Modes: Single-player, multiplayer
- Arcade system: ST-V

Guardian Force (Note: Japanese: ガーディアン フォース, Hepburn: Gādian Fōsu) is a multidirectional shooter videogame released in 1998 for the Sega Saturn and the ST-V arcade system by Success.

== Gameplay ==
Arcade version screenshot

Guardian Force is a multi-directional scrolling shooter game where the player controls a tank with a turret that can shoot in 360 degrees. The screen scrolls automatically, and the player can acquire a variety of weapon power-ups for the tank.

== Development and release ==
It was included in the 2021 Cotton Guardian Force Saturn Tribute compilation for the PlayStation 4 and Nintendo Switch. It includes new features like rewind, slow mode, and quick save. The compilation was ported to Microsoft Windows in 2022.

== Reception ==
At the time of its original release, Super GamePower praised its diversified and frenetic gameplay. Nintendo Life criticized the Nintendo Switch port for not being fully in English.
