= Ninja Studio =

Japanese video game developer

Ninja Studio (株式会社ニンジャスタジオ, Kabushikigaisha Ninja Sutajio) was a Japanese video game developer for mobile phone and handheld gaming consoles. It was best known for its Izuna the Unemployed Ninja series for the Nintendo DS. Ninja Studio was founded in July 2003 with its headquarters in Izumisano, Osaka Prefecture. Success was the main publisher for the company's games prior to its decision to pull back from releasing Nintendo DS and console titles. Ninja Studio then worked with D3 Publisher before its own acquisition from Namco Bandai Holdings. Ninja Studio appears to have closed, as their official website was taken offline in May 2010.

== Games ==
Games released by Ninja Studio:

- A Ninja's Tale (Mobile, 2004)
- Izuna: Legend of the Unemployed Ninja (DS, 2007)
- Izuna 2: The Unemployed Ninja Returns (DS, 2008)
- Tactical Guild (DS, 2008)
- Tactics Layer: Ritina Guard Senki (DS, 2009)
- Windy X Windam (DS, 2010)
