= The Dark Spire =

2008 video game

- North American box art
- Developer: Success
- Publishers: NA: Atlus; JP: Success
- Composer: Kenichi Arakawa
- Platform: Nintendo DS
- Release: JP: May 22, 2008; NA: April 14, 2009
- Genre: Role-playing video game
- Mode: Single-player

The Dark Spire, known as Genmu no Tō to Tsurugi no Okite (Note: Japanese: 幻霧ノ塔ト剣ノ掟; "The Tower of Mist and the Law of the Sword") in Japan, is a role-playing game developed by Success for the Nintendo DS. It was released on May 22, 2008 in Japan and April 14, 2009 in North America which was published by Atlus.

== Gameplay ==
The gameplay centers on exploring the namesake dungeon known as the Dark Spire while improving the skills and stats of player's characters by gaining experience. An alignment system and a class system are included in the game. The player's alignment affects who can join player's party, what skills can be learned by party members of different classes, and even equipment choices. The Spire is explored in a first-person perspective, and many classical RPG elements are included, such as random encounters and equipment. The player is tasked to find and defeat the Archmage Tyrhung at the top of the Dark Spire and to retrieve a necklace from him.

The Dark Spire is a throwback to old first-person dungeon crawler RPGs, such as The Bard's Tale or Wizardry. As a tribute, the game can be set in a mode which renders graphics and sound/music which could have been produced in a game dating to the late 1980s or early 1990s. The game allows to play as one of four races - human, dwarf, elf or halfling - each with unique stats and standard alignment.

== Reception ==
Reception

Aggregate score
Aggregator	Score
Metacritic	69/100

Review scores
Publication	Score
1Up.com	C+
Destructoid	7.5/10
Game Informer	7/10
GamePro	3.5/5
GameZone	7.8/10
IGN	8/10
Nintendo Power	5/10
Nintendo World Report	7.5/10

The game received "average" reviews according to video game review aggregator Metacritic.
