= Waku Waku Volley =

- Waku Waku Volley 2 cover art
- Developer(s): Athena
- Publisher(s): Success; Agetec
- Platform(s): PlayStation, PlayStation 2
- Release: PlayStation: JP: November 26, 1998; PlayStation 2: JP: January 30, 2003; PAL: April 29, 2004
- Genre(s): Sports
- Mode(s): Single-player, multiplayer

Waku Waku Volley is a series of indoor volleyball video games released for PlayStation and PlayStation 2. It is a part of the Superlite 2000 series.

The first and PSone game was released in 1998 in Japan and the second was released for PS2 in 2003 in Japan and in Europe with the name Volleyball Xciting.

The game can be played in several modes, such as "World Mode" for competing against top international opponents; "Exhibition Mode" which allows up to four players; and "Beach Mode".
