= Castrol Honda Superbike 2000 =

1999 video game

- Developer: Interactive Entertainment Ltd.
- Publisher: Midas Interactive Entertainment
- Series: Castrol HONDA Superbike
- Platform: Windows
- Release: EU: July 1999; US: May 7, 2000; JP: 2001
- Genre: Racing
- Modes: Single-player; Multiplayer

Castrol HONDA -World Superbike Team- Superbike 2000 (Short: Castrol HONDA Superbike 2000; Official abbreviation: CHS 2000) is a licensed motorcycle racing game, developed by Interactive Entertainment Ltd. and published by Midas Interactive Entertainment. The game features the Honda RVF750 RC45 racing motorcycle. The game only licenses the Castrol Honda team and the names of both riders, Aaron Slight and Colin Edwards from the 2000 Superbike World Championship season. However, it is possible to edit the names of both riders of 12 teams.

== Gameplay ==
The player controls a motorcyclist in races on various international race tracks. Game types are "Trainer" (follow the bike of the trainer to learn the best line), "Practice" (solo on one track), "Weekend" (against the field on one track) and "Championship" (whole season against the whole field). Each race has three parts: "Practice Session", "Qualifying" and "Race". The degree of "Realism" can be modified (Difficulty: Rookie or Ace; 4 to 24 riders; 3 to 10 laps or "full race" which is 100 km; Wheelies; Penalties; Damage etc.). In the bike setup, gearbox transmission (automatic or manual), final drive speed for the 6 gears, and the gear sprockets can be modified. The game also features randomly changing weather conditions ("Weather forecast": dry, sunny, etc.).

== Reception and reviews ==
The game received a score of 72.29% on GameRankings, based on seven individual reviews. The game was reviewed by the German magazine "PC Games" and received a rating of 66%. The reviewer concluded that the game is rather an arcade title than a simulation for pro gamers.

== Sequels and Spin-offs ==
There are four games in the Castrol HONDA Superbike series, each one was produced by Interactive Entertainment Ltd:

- Castrol HONDA SuperBike World Champions (1998 for PC)
- Castrol HONDA -World Superbike Team- Superbike Racing (1999 for PlayStation)
- Castrol HONDA -World Superbike Team- Superbike 2000 (1999 for PC)
- Castrol HONDA -World Superbike Team- VTR (2001 for PlayStation)

Note: Some sites erroneously state that "Castrol HONDA Superbike Racing" (PlayStation) and Castrol HONDA Superbike 2000 (PC) are versions of the same game. However, both, game titles and content (tracks and features) are quite different, making up for two different games.
