= Castrol Honda Superbike Racing =

1999 video game

- Developer: Interactive Entertainment Ltd.
- Publishers: NA: Electronic Arts; EU: THQ
- Director: James Bailey
- Producer: Tony Love
- Designer: Tuan Pingster Nguyen
- Programmers: Dan Azzopardi, Alex Jakes, John Rees, Vladislav Kaipetsky
- Artist: Imran Hussain
- Series: Castrol HONDA Superbike
- Platform: PlayStation
- Release: NA: May 25, 1999; UK: October 22, 1999
- Genre: Racing
- Modes: Single-player; Multiplayer

Castrol HONDA -World Superbike Team- Superbike Racing (short: Castrol HONDA Superbike Racing) is a licensed motorcycle racing game, developed by Interactive Entertainment Ltd. The game features the Honda RVF750 RC45 and the riders Aaron Slight and Colin Edwards of the 1998 Superbike World Championship season.

== Gameplay ==
The player controls a motorcyclist (default names are A.Slight and C.Edwards) in races on various international race tracks. Game types are "Practice Session" (solo practice), "Trainer Session" (where the player has to follow the trainer's bike to learn the optimum racing line), "Single Race" (one race on a chosen track against contestants) and "Championship" (race the whole season). The latter two consist of three parts: "Practice Session", "Qualifying" and "Race". In each race, a field of eight bikers races simultaneously, including the human players. Game options include Difficulty (Rookie, Novice, Amateur, Semi Professional, Professional, Ace), and number of laps (3, 5, 10 laps or "full race" which is 100 km). In the bike setup, the gearbox (automatic or manual), final drive for each gear and gear sprocket can be modified.

== Reception ==
Reception

Aggregate score
Aggregator	Score
GameRankings	54%

Review scores
Publication	Score
AllGame	1.5/5
CNET Gamecenter	6/10
Electronic Gaming Monthly	4.625/10 (Note: Four critics of Electronic Gaming Monthly gave the game each a score of 6.5/10, 5/10, 3/10, and 4/10.)
Famitsu	26/40
Game Informer	6.25/10
GameFan	64% (Note: In GameFan's viewpoint of the game, one critic gave it a score of 45, and the other 82.)
GameRevolution	D+
GameSpot	3.8/10
IGN	4/10
Next Generation	2/5
Official U.S. PlayStation Magazine	2/5
The Sydney Morning Herald	3/5

The game received mixed reviews according to the review aggregation website GameRankings. John Lee of NextGen said of the game, "You might learn a bit about bike racing, but after you've zipped around the same track a dozen or so times, this is just plain dull." In Japan, where the game was ported and published by Success as part of the SuperLite 1500 series on April 27, 2000, Famitsu gave it a score of 26 out of 40. GamePro said, "If you're a huge fan of superbike racing, you may want to check out Castrol to feed your superbike need, but you'd be smart to rent before buying. Everyone else should stick with Moto Racer 2 for solid morotcycle racing." (Note: GamePro gave the game two 2.5/5 scores for graphics and sound, 4/5 for control, and 3/5 for fun factor.)

The game was reviewed by the German multiformat console magazine "MAN!AC" and received a rating of 58%. The review considered the game a "mediocre racer with many racing tracks but simple visuals and little realism in controls". Janice Tong of The Sydney Morning Herald said, "For anyone who is into Superbike racing, this game will be a lot more meaningful and I suppose there is always the nostalgic element of playing the role of your favourite rider."

== Sequels and Spin-offs ==
There are three other games in the Castrol HONDA Superbike series of which each one was produced by Midas Interactive Entertainment:

- Castrol HONDA SuperBike World Champions (1998 for PC)
- Castrol HONDA World Superbike Team Superbike 2000 (1999 for PC)
- Castrol HONDA World Superbike Team VTR (2001 for PlayStation)

Note: Although the PlayStation version (by Bubble Boy Ltd) and the PC version (with the name suffix "2000") were released the same year, they are individual games (as the different titles suggest) and not just versions of the same game.
