= Rhythm 'n Notes: Improve Your Music Skills =

2007 video game

Rhythm 'n Notes
- North American cover art (Nintendo DS)
- Developer: Success
- Publishers: Success (JP); Agetec (US); 505 Games (EU)
- Designer: Rarecho
- Platform: Nintendo DS
- Release: JP: January 11, 2007; NA: October 23, 2007
- Genre: Music video game
- Mode: Single-player video game

Rhythm 'n Notes: Improve Your Music Skills (or Rhythm 'n Notes), known in Japan as Tenohira Rakushū: Zettai Onkan Training DS (てのひら楽習：絶対音感トレーニングDS, lit. "Musical Palm: Absolute Sound Sensation Training DS") is a music game published by Success in Japan, by Agetec in North America, and by 505 Games in Europe. It was released for the Nintendo DS in 2007. Its focus is on rhythm for drums and tonal patterns for piano.

== Reception ==
Reception

Aggregate score
Aggregator	Score
Metacritic	26/100

Review scores
Publication	Score
GameRevolution	F
IGN	2.5/10
NGamer	20%

The game received "generally unfavorable reviews" according to the review aggregation website Metacritic.
