= Drone Tactics =

2007 video game

- Developer: Success
- Publishers: JP: Success; NA: Atlus
- Composer: Motoi Sakuraba
- Platform: Nintendo DS
- Release: JP: August 2, 2007; NA: May 13, 2008
- Genre: Turn-based strategy
- Modes: Single-player, multiplayer

Drone Tactics (昆虫ウォーズ Konchuu Wars in Japan) is a turn-based strategy video game developed and published in Japan by Success and published in North America by Atlus for the Nintendo DS, which was released on May 13, 2008. The story follows two school children who find small insects from another world, and help them save it from an impending threat. Drone Tactics received positive reviews upon release. Critics praised the gameplay but criticized the story and characters for skewing towards a younger audience.

== Gameplay ==
The player controls giant robot insects called Drones. The Drones have more than 100 different customizable weapons and upgrades. Alongside dozens of campaign operations in the game's story mode, the game features over 70 maps and local multiplayer play.

== Plot ==
The story follows two young school children named Yamato and Tsubasa who find two small insects, a butterfly named Y-Ite and a rhino beetle named K-Buto. The insects came from a world called Cimexus and were looking for human allies to save their home world from an impending threat called the Black Swarm. The two children agree to help and head to Cimexus to fight the Black Swarm.

== Reception ==
Reception

Aggregate score
Aggregator	Score
Metacritic	74/100

Review scores
Publication	Score
1Up.com	B
Eurogamer	7/10
Famitsu	28/40
Game Informer	7/10
GamesRadar+	8/10
GameZone	8/10
IGN	7.4/10
Nintendo Power	7/10
Nintendo World Report	8/10

Drone Tactics received "mixed or average" reviews, according to review aggregator Metacritic.

Eurogamer called Drone Tactics a "superior example of turn-based strategy". RPGFan criticised the plot, but called Drone Tactics "an excellent Strategy RPG". GameZone also criticised the story, calling it "groan-inducing for anyone over the age of 12", but praised the gameplay, saying it is a "deep, fun strategy-RPG". GamesRadar commented that the "school age heroes, "let's be friends" story, and insect-like robots are clearly meant to endear the game to a younger audience and to escape the ire of nervous parents that thought Advance Wars or Custom Robo were too violent." and praised the game as "40-plus hours worth of awesome battles and addictive customizing." Nintendo World Report called the story "terrible" and the dialogue "god awful", while singling out the graphics as "some of the best on the DS", concluding that "Overall, Drone Tactics is an enjoyable turn-based strategy RPG." 1UP.com said "Ignore its childish look, silly plot, and icky-bug factor – Drone Tactics is serious fun." IGN also found fault with the story, characters, and dialogue, while praising the "engaging insect mech combat", concluding "Drone Tactics is a solid strategy game". Game Informer called the story "absolutely terrible", and the game "functional and occasionally fun, but it never gets exciting."
