= Psyvariar 2 =

2003 video game

Psyvariar 2: The Will to Fabricate
- Japanese Dreamcast cover art
- Developers: SKONEC Entertainment Co., Ltd.
- Publisher: Success Corporation
- Platforms: Arcade, Dreamcast, PlayStation 2, Xbox
- Release: 2003: Arcade; JP: November 2003 Dreamcast; JP: February 26, 2004 Xbox; JP: October 28, 2004 PlayStation 2; JP: December 9, 2004
- Genre: Scrolling shooter
- Mode: Single-player
- Arcade system: Sega NAOMI

Psyvariar 2: The Will to Fabricate (Note: Japanese: サイヴァリア2: THE WILL TO FABRICATE) is a vertically scrolling shoot 'em up developed by SKONEC Entertainment and distributed by Success. It is the sequel to the 2000 title, Psyvariar.

== Release ==
The game was initially developed for the Sega NAOMI arcade platform, and was released in Japanese arcades in November 2003. A Dreamcast version was released in February 2004, and the PlayStation 2 port was released later that year. An Xbox port was named Psyvariar 2: Extend Edition and released in 2004.
