= Cotton (series) =

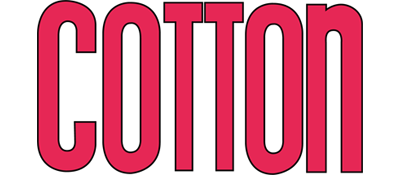
- Genre: Shoot 'em up
- Developer: Success
- Publishers: List: Sega; Hudson Soft; Electronic Arts; Datam Polystar; Sunsoft; Success; City Connection
- Platforms: List: Arcade; Neo Geo Pocket Color PlayStation X68000 TurboGrafx-CD Mobile phones Super Famicom Mega Drive Saturn Dreamcast PlayStation 2 PlayStation 4 PlayStation 5 Nintendo Switch Windows Xbox One Xbox Series X/S
- First release: Cotton: Fantastic Night Dreams; 1991
- Latest release: Cotton Rock with You: Oriental Night Dreams; 2026

Cotton (Japanese: コットン, Hepburn: Kotton) is a series of shoot 'em up video games developed by Success. The series debuted with Cotton: Fantastic Night Dreams in 1991 and has spanned a history of releases in arcades and on consoles. The Cotton games helped establish the cute 'em up subgenre. Instead of warships and battlefields typical of most shoot 'em ups, Cotton games put players in control of a witch riding on a broom and tasks them with fighting through magical haunted kingdoms. Seven games were released between 1991 and 2003. Following an 18-year gap, the series was reintroduced with Cotton Reboot! and Cotton Rock 'n' Roll: Superlative Night Dreams in 2021.

== Series overview ==
The games in the Cotton series follows a young witch named Cotton who has an addiction to Willow. She is accompanied by the fairy Silk. Most of the games in the Cotton series are side scrolling shooting games. Cotton is classified as a "Cute 'em up", which is a sub-genre of shmups that tend to have unusual, oftentimes completely bizarre opponents for the player to fight. The character Silk functions similar to the "options" from the Gradius series. Rainbow Cotton is the first game in the series to be fully 3D.

Each Cotton game features a unique story that is loosely connected to the other games in the series. All of these stories revolve around the obsession of a young witch named Nata de Cotton with a magical type of candy called "Willow". Cotton is a red-haired witch with a hunger for Willow candy that drives all of her actions. She is hot-headed, immature, and often overreacts. Although her quests in each game are ultimately to serve a higher purpose, she is never involved personally for any reason other than the prospect of getting to eat a Willow. In a typical Cotton game, Cotton will embark on her journey through the game's stages with the hope that she will be rewarded with a Willow at the end. However, when the game is over, she almost always winds up empty-handed.

== Games ==
Year	Title	Platforms	Developer(s)	Publisher(s)
1991	Cotton: Fantastic Night Dreams	Arcade, TurboGrafx-CD, X68000, PlayStation, Nintendo Switch, Neo Geo Pocket Color, Astro City Mini	Success	Sega, Hudson Soft, Electronic Arts, SNK
1994	Cotton 100%	Super Famicom, PlayStation, Nintendo Switch, PlayStation 4, Xbox One, Xbox Series X/S	Success	Datam Polystar, ININ Games
1994	Panorama Cotton	Sega Mega Drive, Nintendo Switch, PlayStation 4, Xbox One, Xbox Series X/S	Success	Sunsoft, ININ Games
1997	Cotton 2: Magical Night Dreams	Arcade, Saturn	Success	Tecmo
1998	Cotton Boomerang: Magical Night Dreams	Arcade, Saturn	Success	Tecmo
2000	Rainbow Cotton	Dreamcast	Success	Success
2003	Magical Pachinko Cotton	Pachinko, PlayStation 2	Success	Success
2021	Cotton Reboot!	PlayStation 4, Nintendo Switch, Nintendo Switch 2, Windows	Rocket-Engine Co., Ltd	BEEP, ININ Games
2021	Cotton Rock 'n' Roll: Superlative Night Dreams (Note: In the west console versions are titled Cotton Fantasy.)	Arcade, PlayStation 4, Nintendo Switch, Windows	Studio Saizensen	Success
2024	Rainbow Cotton (Remake)	Nintendo Switch, PlayStation 4, PlayStation 5, Windows, Xbox One	KRITZELKRATZ 3000	ININ Games
2025	Cotton Reboot! High Tension!	Nintendo Switch, PlayStation 4, PlayStation 5	BEEP	Success, Clear River Games
2026	Cotton Rock with You: Oriental Night Dreams	Arcade, Nintendo Switch 2, PlayStation 5, Windows	Studio Saizensen	Success

=== Compilation ===
Year	Title	Included games	Platforms	Publisher
2021	Cotton Guardian Force Saturn Tribute	Cotton 2 Cotton Boomerang; Guardian Force	PlayStation 4, Nintendo Switch, Windows, Xbox One	City Connection

== Other appearances ==
The main character Cotton has had appearances in other works:

- Rondo of Swords: Although not a Cotton game specifically, the willow obsessed witch joins your party in this strategy role-playing title, also made by Success.
- Trouble Witches Origin - Episode 1: Daughters of Amalgam: The first time Cotton has appeared with her classic gameplay in nearly a couple of decades, her first video game appearance anywhere in a decade and the first time she has been in a video game not developed by her company of origin, Success. A game centering around witches and is similarly in the shmup genre, Cotton tags along as a DLC character. This also marks the first appearance of the fairy Silk since Rainbow Cotton nearly a couple of decades ago.
- Umihara Kawase Fresh! Cotton makes an appearance as a playable character.
- In 1994 Cotton - Minakami Hiroki is part of Gamest Comics Collection.
- In 2012, A manga titled Toriaezu supīdoappu demo shite oku no Kokoro! (とりあえずスピードアップでもしておくのココロ!?)
