= Magical Chase =

1991 video game

- Developer: Quest Corporation
- Publishers: TurboGrafx-16: JP: Palsoft; NA: Turbo Technologies Inc.; Bothtec (Windows); Microcabin (GBC)
- Designer: Hiroshi Minagawa
- Artist: Hiroshi Minagawa
- Composers: Hitoshi Sakimoto; Masaharu Iwata
- Platforms: TurboGrafx-16, Microsoft Windows, Game Boy Color
- Release: TurboGrafx-16: JP: November 15, 1991; NA: July 1993; Windows: JP: April 10, 1998; Game Boy Color: JP: August 4, 2000
- Genre: Horizontal-scrolling shooter
- Mode: Single-player

Magical Chase (Note: Japanese: マジカルチェイス, Hepburn: Majikaru Cheisu) is a horizontal-scrolling shooter video game developed by Quest Corporation for the TurboGrafx-16. It was published by Palsoft in Japan on November 15, 1991, and by Turbo Technologies Inc. in North America in July 1993. A version for Microsoft Windows was released in 1998, followed by a version for the Game Boy Color (GBC) in 2000. The plot follows Ripple, an apprentice witch, accompanied by her star maiden friends Topsy and Turvy, on a quest to retrieve the demons she accidentally released from a forbidden book. The player controls Ripple, fighting enemies and avoiding obstacles, while collecting crystals to purchase items in shops.

Magical Chase was created by the same Quest staff that would later work on Ogre Battle, Tactics Ogre, and Final Fantasy Tactics. It was designed by art director Hiroshi Minagawa. The team wanted to create a shooter due to the popularity of the genre at the time, but they also wanted something unique and to explore how far they could go with the PC Engine, so production took a long time. The soundtrack was composed by Hitoshi Sakimoto and Masaharu Iwata.

Magical Chase received generally favorable reception from critics, with praise for the graphics, music, gameplay, and lack of slowdown. Some publications felt the presentation was lacking and the controls for the stars could be frustrating, while criticism focused on its short length. Retrospective commentary for the game has been generally favorable, and the North American release has become an expensive collector's item.

== Gameplay ==
Ripple, accompanied by Topsy and Turvy, facing against the third stage boss (TurboGrafx-16 version shown)

Magical Chase is a horizontal-scrolling shooter game. The story revolves around Ripple, a mischievous apprentice witch at a magic school. One day, Ripple's teacher asks her to stay alone at school. However, Ripple breaks her promise by opening a forbidden book called Sleeping Demons; in doing so, she accidentally releases several sealed demons into the outside world. Remembering that her teacher would turn her into a frog if she disobeyed, Ripple, along with her star maiden friends, Topsy and Turvy, embarks on a quest to return the demons back to the book. (Note: Attributed to multiple references:)

The player controls Ripple, fighting enemies and avoiding obstacles. Topsy and Turvy fly around Ripple as support, providing additional firepower. The player can adjust the firing direction and the position of the stars. These also act as shields, protecting Ripple from bullets fired by smaller enemies. Defeated enemies drop lollipops and cakes to refill health. Enemies also drop collectible crystals of varying colors and values, which serve as currency in shops.

Throughout each stage, floating shops run by the pumpkin vendor Halloween Jack appear and are accessible by the player. In the Game Boy Color version, the vendor is a girl. There are nine magic attacks that can be bought for Ripple, including a rapid shot, a triple shot, a scatter shot, bouncing rings, wave beams, bubbles, and homing shots. Ripple has three special magic spells that can be stocked up to six times and saved for use throughout the game. These include health restorers, a single-use zapper that destroys all enemies and their bullets, and a power-up that increases the offensive and defensive attributes of the stars. Topsy and Turvy can also be powered up with two magic attacks. Other items include a speed regulator, a medicine that restores full health, a fruit that extends Ripple's initial maximum health by one, and single-use elixirs that restore health upon depletion. However, the shop does not appear during the last stage.

Each stage has a mid-boss and a boss. There are a total of six stages, called seals. If Ripple's health runs out, the player can start over or continue from the beginning of the last stage reached with the last weapon acquired. There are three difficulty levels: Breeze (easy), Bumpy (normal), and Rough (hard). In Breeze, only the first three stages are playable, while in Rough, enemy attacks are stronger. In the Game Boy Color version, the highest difficulty level is unavailable, and hint screens are added instead.

== Development ==
Magical Chase was the first PC Engine game from Palsoft, a Japanese third-party publisher for the PC Engine and Sega Mega Drive. The game was developed by the same team at Quest Corporation that would later work on Ogre Battle, Tactics Ogre, and Final Fantasy Tactics. It was designed by Hiroshi Minagawa, who also served as art director. The Quest staff wanted to create a shooter, as shooters were popular at the time, but they also wanted to do something unique within the genre. When development began, the team had specific ideas for the characters, but the enemies were still undecided. Production of the game took a long time, as the staff wanted to explore how far they could push the PC Engine and were meticulous about details such as timing the appearance of enemies with the background music in the third and fifth stages.

The music for Magical Chase was scored by Hitoshi Sakimoto and Masaharu Iwata. It was Sakimoto's first work on the PC Engine and with Quest, having joined the company at Iwata's request. Sakimoto designed a sound driver, as he wanted to test through trial and error what kind of audio the PC Engine's sound hardware could produce, and the driver was constantly updated to create better sounds. Sakimoto acknowledged that creating the soundtrack was challenging due to hardware limitations, but he felt it was well-suited to the game. Iwata considered it the shooter for which he liked composing music the most, as he encountered no issues with the PC Engine hardware and thoroughly enjoyed composing music for "such a good game". In 2013, SuperSweep released a CD album in Japan containing the game's original soundtrack, as well as arrangements and prototype songs.

== Release ==
Magical Chase was first announced for the PC Engine at the 1991 Consumer Soft Group (CSG) trade show; an August 1991 release date was planned. The game was shown at the 1991 Tokyo Toy Show, but its release was rescheduled for October 1991. It was released in Japan by Palsoft on November 15, 1991, in small quantities, and sold out that same day. Palsoft received requests and made efforts for a re-release, but it never materialized. Due to its limited availability on the market, the first edition became a premium item. In 1993, PC Engine Fan announced a limited re-release of the game as a commemorative project for the magazine's fifth anniversary. The initial deadline for pre-orders was July 31, 1993; however, the deadline was extended to August 9, 1993, due to overwhelming consumer demand that exceeded the publication's expectations. The reissue, dubbed the "Fan Edition," was distributed on September 30, 1993, via mail only. It came in a white case and featured a sticker reflecting its association with PC Engine Fan.

In North America, the game was showcased for the TurboGrafx-16 at the 1992 Summer Consumer Electronics Show and initially scheduled for release in November 1992, but was delayed until January 1993. It was released in July 1993 by Turbo Technologies Inc. (T.T.i.), a joint venture formed by NEC and Hudson Soft in 1992 to relaunch the TurboGrafx-16, which was struggling in the North American market. GamePro wrote that the game was released in April 1993. The American version features graphical changes compared to the original Japanese version, such as several redrawn sprites, as well as an altered foreground and background in the first stage. Because it was released in limited quantities near the end of the console's lifespan, Magical Chase became one of the rarest and most expensive TurboGrafx-16 titles, commanding high prices on the secondary collecting market.

=== Ports and re-release ===
Magical Chase was ported to Microsoft Windows and released in Japan by Bothtec on April 10, 1998, featuring redbook audio from the original PC Engine release. Bothtec re-released the Windows version as a budget title twice: first in November 1998 and then in 2000 as part of its "Bothtec Happy Price" line. The game was also ported to the Game Boy Color (GBC) and released in Japan by Microcabin on August 4, 2000, under the name Magical Chase GB: Minarai Mahoutsukai Kenja no Tani e (Note: マジカルチェイスGB 〜見習い魔法使い 賢者の谷へ〜 (Majikaru Cheisu GB: Minarai Mahōtsukai Kenja no Tani e)). The GBC version retains the parallax scrolling of the PC Engine version, but features downgraded graphics and simplified music. Due to its limited distribution and inherited popularity, the GBC version fetches high prices on the collecting market. Although Magical Chase GB was not officially published outside Japan, an English fan translation was released in 2001 by the group Gaijin Productions.

In 2000, the PC Engine version became available through Dream Library, (Note: ドリームライブラリ (Dorīmu Raiburari)) an online rental service included with Dream Passport 3 (Note: ドリームパスポート3 (Dorīmu Pasupōto 3)) where Dreamcast users could download and play emulated PC Engine and Sega Mega Drive games for a fee charged during the rental period of each title; however, Sega shut down the service in 2003. The rights to Magical Chase are currently owned by Square Enix (previously Square), after Quest withdrew from game development and was acquired in 2002.

== Reception ==
Reception

Review scores
Publication	Score
AllGame	3.5/5
Consoles +	97%
Electronic Gaming Monthly	7/10, 7/10, 7/10, 7/10
Famitsu	7/10, 6/10, 6/10, 7/10
Gekkan PC Engine	90/100, 90/100, 85/100, 75/100, 85/100
Génération 4	88%
Joypad	83%
Joystick	83%
Marukatsu PC Engine	9/10, 8/10, 8/10, 9/10
VideoGames & Computer Entertainment	7/10
Consolemania	90/100
DuoWorld	7/10
Electronic Games	90%
Hippon Super!	9/10

The Japanese publication Micom BASIC Magazine ranked Magical Chase fifteenth in popularity in its March 1992 issue, and it received a score of 26.77 out of 30 in a 1993 readers' poll conducted by PC Engine Fan, ranking among the top five PC Engine titles at the number three spot. The game also garnered generally favorable reviews from critics.

Jacques Harbonn and Rocket of Consoles + applauded the game's graphics, highlighting the artwork in each stage, sprite animations, smooth scrolling, and lack of slowdown. They also praised the soundtrack and the shop system, but noted that the overall presentation was its weakest point. Consolemania's Giancarlo Calzetta lauded the game's audiovisual department and its fast-paced gameplay, but found it too easy. Electronic Games' Laurie Yates found Magical Chase to be a solid shooter, praising its crisp graphics, enjoyable sound, and high playability, but noted that the controls could be frustrating. Although the fact that Ripple, Topsy, and Turvy were female seemed out of place, as shooters are typically a male domain, Yates felt they were presented in a way that belied their cuteness.

Philippe Querleux of Génération 4 found the game's comic-style graphics to be pleasing, but felt that the witch's maneuverability and the numerous enemies on screen made it difficult to distinguish elements on the screen. Joypad's Jean-Marc Demoly and Joystick's Sébastien Hamon praised Magical Chase for its colorful and well-crafted visuals, stating that it benefited from an original theme despite being a classic shoot 'em up at its core. GamePro's Kay Oss highlighted the game's colorful enemies and cartoonish audio, but found its overall challenge to be average. AllGame's Shawn Sackenheim commended the game's vibrant cartoony graphics, lack of slowdown and flickering, soundscapes, moderate challenge, and gameplay, but criticized its short length.

Electronic Gaming Monthly's four editors commented that the idea of playing as a witch was a welcome change from a spaceship. They also gave positive remarks to the game's visuals, enemy design, music, solid gameplay, and the ability to purchase power-ups in the store. Writing for VideoGames & Computer Entertainment and DuoWorld, Josh Mandel favorably compared the game's visual style to Air Zonk, highlighting its ambitious graphical effects and lack of slowdown. Mandel also commended its fun gameplay and appropriate difficulty, but found the stars difficult to use due to poor documentation. Famitsu's four reviewers found Magical Chase to be highly polished and gave positive comments on its pastel-style graphics, cute characters, and game balance, but expressed annoyance at the stars for not working as they wanted.

=== Retrospective coverage ===
Retrospective commentary for Magical Chase has been equally favorable. Tips & Tricks' Joe Santulli considered it one of the most entertaining TurboGrafx-16 games and one of the best horizonal-scrolling shooters created for home consoles. Video Game Collector's Greg Wilcox lauded its exceptional visuals, colorful animations, soundscapes, and fun action, but found the short length to be the game's main flaw. Retro Gamer named it one of the ten perfect games for the PC Engine. IGN included the game alongside Cotton among the top ten TurboGrafx titles that were not released on the Virtual Console.

Hardcore Gamer's Michael Thomasson stated that the game's extensive use of parallax scrolling made it stand out on the TurboGrafx-16. USgamer's Jeremy Parish called it a shameless Cotton clone. Hardcore Gaming 101's Kurt Kalata wrote that "while it's not the best shooter on the Turbografx-16, it is one of the better ones, even if it is a little on the easy side". PCMag proclaimed that Magical Chase "shows what could have been possible for all TurboGrafx-16 games had the console seen continuous American support into the early 1990s". Paste listed it as one of the ten games they wish had been included on the TurboGrafx-16 Mini.
