= Castrol Honda SuperBike World Champions =

1998 video game

- Developers: Intense Simulations Entertainment; Interactive Entertainment Ltd.
- Publisher: Midas Interactive Entertainment
- Director: James Bailey
- Producer: Tony Love
- Designer: Tuan Pingster Nguyen
- Programmers: Dan Azzopardi, John Rees, Alex Jakes, Vladislav Kaipetsky
- Artist: FAD
- Series: Castrol HONDA Superbike
- Platform: Microsoft Windows
- Release: UK: March 24, 1998; NA: April 1998; GER: June 1, 1998
- Genre: Racing
- Modes: Single-player; Multiplayer

Castrol HONDA SuperBike World Champions is a licensed motorcycle racing game, developed by Intense Simulations Entertainment and Interactive Entertainment Ltd. and published by Midas Interactive Entertainment. The game features the Honda RVF750 RC45 and the riders of the 1997 Superbike World Championship season. The game title was chosen because John Kocinski won the 1997 World Superbike Championship on a Castrol Honda.

== Gameplay ==
The player controls a motorcyclist in races on various international race tracks. Game modes are "Practice" and "Championship". Each race has three parts: "Practice Session", "Qualifying" and "Race". There are closed-circuit Grand Prix tracks and street race tracks. The degree of "realism" can be modified (4 to 24 riders; 3 to 10 laps or "full race" which is 100 km). The bike setup offers tweaking of the gear sprockets. It is possible to play with five other players via network or splitscreen.

== Reception ==
Reception

Aggregate score
Aggregator	Score
GameRankings	67%

Review scores
Publication	Score
Computer Games Strategy Plus	3/5
Computer Gaming World	4/5
Edge	5/10
GamePro	3/5
IGN	7.5/10
Next Generation	1/5
PC Gamer (UK)	85%
PC Gamer (US)	63%
PC Zone	79%

The game received average reviews according to the review aggregation website GameRankings. Next Generation said that the game "had the potential to be a top-notch racing simulation. Instead, it's just another racing has-been. Check the bargain bins for a PC copy of Matrix TT [sic] – it's cheaper and a lot more fun."

The game was reviewed by the German magazine PC Games and received a rating of 74%. The reviewer concluded that while the game represented a bright spot among racing games, he was hoping for more simulation aspects.

== Sequels and spin-offs ==
There are three other games in the Castrol HONDA Superbike series, and each one was produced by Midas Interactive Entertainment:

- Castrol HONDA -World Superbike Team- Superbike Racing (1999 for PlayStation)
- Castrol HONDA -World Superbike Team- Superbike 2000 (1999 for PC)
- Castrol HONDA -World Superbike Team- VTR (2001 for PlayStation)
