= Operation Darkness =

2007 video game

- Developer: Success
- Publishers: JP: Success; NA: Atlus
- Director: Hisakazu Masubuchi
- Producer: Ken Ogura
- Designers: Ken Ogura; Hiromichi Sakuma; Hisakazu Masubuchi
- Programmers: Eiji Takaki; Masaki Abe
- Artist: Yoshio Sugiura (character)
- Writer: Ken Ogura
- Composers: Kenichi Arakawa; Kazushi Tsurukubo; Tetsurō Satō
- Platform: Xbox 360
- Release: JP: October 11, 2007; NA: June 24, 2008
- Genre: Tactical role-playing game
- Modes: Single-player, multiplayer

Operation Darkness is a tactical role-playing game for the Xbox 360 developed and published by Japanese studio Success on October 11, 2007 in Japan. A North American version was released on June 24, 2008 by Atlus. The game is a fantasy conception of World War II, featuring weaponry and events from that time period, but with fantasy elements such as dragons and vampires mixed in.

== Synopsis ==
Operation Darkness follows a squad of British SAS soldiers fighting the Nazis across the European Theater. The story covers much of the real history of the European war, including the battles for North Africa and the liberation of mainland Europe. French resistance fighters, American soldiers, and others appear as non-player characters.

The game diverges significantly from real history in that zombies of deceased Nazi soldiers appear as enemies, and two of the player characters can transform into werewolves. Other fantasy elements include the appearance of supernatural foes, such as vampires and dragons, along with the ability to use magic spells.

== Gameplay ==
Gameplay consists of a series of tactical battles; between battles, the player may resupply the characters, purchase new items, and select which characters will participate in the following mission. Battles play out in standard tactical role-playing game (RPG) fashion, with turn order based on characters' speed statistics. During a turn, characters can move, attack, use items, pick up items from dead soldiers, and cast spells. The battle system also includes factors like cover and decreased accuracy from movement. Differing from the great majority of games of this genre, long-range attacks tend to be far more frequent than close-range attacks, and many characters can hit targets with high accuracy from a distance of more than half of the battlefield. Characters killed in battle remain dead permanently unless revived by playable character Herbert East before the end of the stage. Generic soldiers can replace fallen ones.

Characters possess the following attributes: HP, MS (martial spirit), Attack, Defense, Speed, Hit, Luck, Weight, and Move. Each character also has specific weapon-related abilities and other skills, predisposing them to particular weapon types. In addition, characters can carry up to five weapons and five items. Each weapon and item has a weight value as well, and characters who are overburdened receive penalties to movement.

Two player characters can transform into werewolves, which massively increases their speed and attack. However, maintaining the werewolf form costs MS every turn, limiting its use to short durations.

The game has cooperative online multiplayer with up to four players, and completing missions in multiplayer unlocks new items in the in-game item shop in single-player.

== Characters ==
=== Wolf Pack members ===
- Edward Kyle: A young man seeking revenge after his family and fiancée Alicia were killed in a German air-raid. He enlisted in the army to avenge his family, but was assigned to the Wolf Pack after being saved on the battlefields of North Africa by James Gallant.
- Cordelia Blake (Cordelia Break in the Japanese version): A mysterious young woman who has served in the British Army since the age of 13. While other troops in the Wolf Pack use guns, she fights with her fire-starting abilities.
- James Gallant: The leader of the Wolf Pack, James Gallant is a seasoned veteran, especially when fighting the supernatural. He acts as the de facto leader of the Fang Clan, a tribe of werewolves in Scotland who has been in a bloody conflict with the vampires of the Blood Clan for centuries.
- Jude Lancelot (Jude Lancerot in the Japanese version): Edward Kyle's best friend and brother to his fiancée, Jude fought alongside Edward for the same reasons, but later gets captured by the Blood Clan and turned into a vampire.
- Keith Miller (Keith Mirror in the Japanese version): The squad's fearlessly loyal point man, he is Gallant's Nephew. Like his uncle, he is a lycanthrope.
- Frank Gaunt (Frank Andrea in the Japanese version): Gallant's second-in-command, Gaunt cuts an imposing figure, specializing in close combat. Despite his gruff appearance and brute strength, he is actually very intelligent and chooses his words carefully. It turns out that he is also Dr. Victor Frankenstein’s creation.
- Cynthia Rivele: A top-heavy Irish sniper with supernatural marksmanship.
- Herbert East (Herbert West in the Japanese version): The team's American-born 'medic', Herbert is versed in necromancy. Inspired by the Lovecraft character Herbert West.
- Lewis Canton: A reserve, Lewis puts his talents as a spy to use for the unit, gathering intelligence on the Germans and occasionally joining in the fracas.
- Jack the Ripper: Though he once misused his powers to terrorize the East End of London, he was rehabilitated by the Wolf Pack, who yet regard him with an uneasy acceptance. Jack can use firearms, but is most proficient with knives.
- Elisa Van Helsing (Eliza Van Helsing in the Japanese version): A professor at King's College, Elisa dusts off her Killer Sword and takes up her grandfather's work as a member of the Wolf Pack when times are dire.

=== Villains ===
- Adolf Hitler: The leader of Nazi Germany.
- Heinrich Himmler: The distrustful head of the SS.
- Alexander Vlado: An SS Sturmbannfuhrer (equivalent to major) from a race of ancient vampires called the Blood Clan. Appears pale and ghoulish.
- Carmilla: One of Vlado's officers, and of his same vampire race. Has little regard for human life.

=== Others ===
- Max Neuman: The Wolf Pack accommodates their former enemy, a Panzer Daemon, when a malfunction leads him to defect to the Allies.
- Leona: A 17-year-old girl belonging to the French Resistance who is serving as a liaison.

== Reception ==
Reception

Aggregate score
| Aggregator | Score |
|---|---|
| Metacritic | 46/100 |

Review scores
| Publication | Score |
|---|---|
| 1Up.com | C− |
| Famitsu | 23/40 |
| GameSpot | 6/10 |
| GameSpy | 2.5/5 |
| GamesRadar+ | 2/5 |
| GameZone | 4/10 |
| Hardcore Gamer | 3.25/5 |
| IGN | 2.5/10 |
| Official Xbox Magazine (US) | 2/10 |
| RPGamer | 1.5/5 |
| Wired | 7/10 |

Operation Darkness received "generally unfavorable reviews" according to the review aggregation website Metacritic. IGN said, "Everything that could have gone wrong did go wrong." In Japan, Famitsu gave it a score of three sixes and one five for a total of 23 out of 40.
