= Cotton 100% =

1994 video game

- Developer: Success
- Publishers: Datam Polystar: Super Famicom; JP: Datam Polystar; NA: Strictly Limited Games Success (PS) ININ Games (NS, XB) United Games Entertainment (PS4)
- Directors: Kazutoshi Yashiki; Motoi Saito
- Producer: Takato Yoshinari
- Designers: Hideki Tamura; Motoi Saito; Shinobu Itō
- Programmer: Mizuho Sasa
- Artist: Masahiro Fukuda
- Composer: Kenichi Hirata
- Series: Cotton
- Platforms: Super Famicom, Nintendo Switch, PlayStation, PlayStation 4, Xbox One, Xbox Series X/S
- Release: 22 April 1994: Super Famicom; JP: 22 April 1994; WW: 29 October 2021 PlayStation; JP: 27 March 2003 Nintendo Switch; WW: 29 October 2021; AU: 30 October 2021 PlayStation 4; NA: 29 October 2021 Xbox One, Series X/S; WW: 7 December 2023
- Genre: Scrolling shooter
- Mode: Single-player

Cotton 100% (Note: Also known as Märchen Adventure Cotton 100% (Japanese: メルヘンア ドベンチャー コットン100％, Hepburn: Meruhen Adobenchā Kotton 100-Pāsento; lit. "Fairytale Adventure Cotton 100%")) is a 1994 scrolling shooter video game developed by Success and originally published by Datam Polystar for the Super Famicom. The second installment in the Cotton franchise, it is a follow-up to Cotton: Fantastic Night Dreams. In the game, players assume the role of the titular young witch who, alongside her fairy companion Silk, sets out on her broomstick on a quest to defeat several monsters and get her Willow candy. Its gameplay is similar to the first game, mainly consisting of shooting mixed with role-playing game-esque elements using a main four-button configuration.

Cotton 100% garnered generally positive reception from critics who reviewed the original Super Famicom version as an import title. Most reviewers compared the game with other shoot 'em up titles like Keio Flying Squadron, Parodius and Pop'n TwinBee, being praised for its audiovisual presentation and gameplay but criticized for the short length and lack of two-player mode. It was later ported to the PlayStation in 2003 as a budget release, featuring downgrades compared with the original version. It was also re-released for Nintendo Switch and PlayStation 4 across western regions in 2021, marking the game's first official international appearance. It also released for Xbox One and Xbox Series X/S in 2023.

== Gameplay ==
Gameplay screenshot.

Cotton 100% is a scrolling shooter game similar to Cotton: Fantastic Night Dreams where players assume role of the young witch Cotton who, alongside her fairy companion Silk, travels seven increasingly difficult levels through a fantasy dream-like world on a quest to defeat several monsters and get her Willow candy. The game is perhaps best described as something of a reinterpretation of the original Cotton as the enemy graphics and behaviors, gameplay mechanics, some of the stages and bosses, as well as the plot itself are virtually identical to the first game. However, in addition to many unique stages and enemies, the theme and colors in Cotton 100% are much brighter, and the actual level mapping is significantly different from the first game.

During gameplay, players must blast various monsters and avoid being shot while collecting crystal power-ups to enhance Cotton's firepower and unleash powerful magic spells on enemies, in addition of bombs capable of obliterating enemies. Cotton 100% also incorporates some role playing game elements as with the original Cotton, as players are able to level up their attack multiple times by collecting crystals dropped by enemies. The weapon system from the original arcade game was simplified, with players now selecting between multiple shot and magic spells configurations on an equipment screen similar to Gradius but the number of magic spells was reduced to two. Magic is refilled by picking up specific power-up items dropped by enemies, while players can also rescue captured fairies from enemies, acting as "options" and their attack formation depends on the currently selected magic spell. The player has lives represented by a broom and three lives, though only one hit is allowed per life and the game is over once all lives are lost but players can keep playing by using a limited number of continues.

== Development ==
Cotton 100% was first announced by Datam Polystar for Super Famicom in 1993, and was released on April 22, 1994 in Japan. It came bundled with a CD insert featuring vocal songs by Cotton's seiyū. It is officially considered a "gaiden" entry in the series. It was co-directed by Kazutoshi Yashiki and Motoi Saito, and produced by Success founder Takato Yoshinari. Saito was also responsible for visual character designs, alongside Shinobu Itō (who worked as artist in Cotton: Fantastic Night Dreams) and Hideki Tamura. Mizuho Sasa acted as main programmer, and Masahiro Fukuda was responsible for the pixel art as co-graphic designer. The music was composed by Kenichi Hirata, while radio actress Takae Yoriguchi reprised her role as Cotton.

According to Sasa, the game started off development as a straight port of Cotton: Fantastic Night Dreams for Super Famicom, although it became more of an original title around the planning phase. Because of the amount of colors the Super Famicom could handle at once, it was decided to give the game a more cheery aesthetic, with "100% natural colors". Due to the amount of slowdown that could often happen on scrolling shooter games on the Super Famicom, special attention was also given to the amount of stuff that happened at once on screen, so that the game ran as smoothly as possible.

== Release ==
Prior to launch, Cotton 100% received two CD albums published in Japan by Datam Polystar, one of which contained arranged and prototype tracks. The game was later ported by Success to the PlayStation and published in Japan on March 27, 2003, under the "SuperLite 1500" budget series, featuring bugs not present in the original Super Famicom version. On November 10, 2010, the PlayStation port was re-released for PlayStation Network by Hamster Corporation in Japan as part of their Game Archives series. In 2021, the title was launched for Nintendo Switch and PlayStation 4 across western regions in digital and physical formats on October 29 by ININ Games and Strictly Limited Games, marking the game's first official international appearance. In addition, the original Super Famicom version was also released in western regions under a limited run of copies. It is also set to release for Xbox One and Xbox Series X/S on December 7, 2023.

== Reception ==
Reception

Aggregate score
Aggregator	Score
Metacritic	(NS) 71/100

Review scores
Publication	Score
Computer and Video Games	(SFC) 75/100
Famitsu	(SFC) 7/10, 5/10, 6/10, 7/10
Mega Fun	(SFC) 70%
Super Play	(SFC) 79%
TouchArcade	(NS) 3/5
Video Games (DE)	(SFC) 80%
Digitally Downloaded	(NS) 4.5/5
Super Console	(SFC) 80/100

Cotton 100% was met with generally positive reception from critics who reviewed the original Super Famicom version as an import title, most of which compared the game with Keio Flying Squadron, Parodius and Pop'n TwinBee. Computer and Video Games's Denis Ahmet praised the audiovisual presentation, playability and challenge but noted the lack of a two-player mode and originality, criticizing the "crude" boss encounters. Mega Fun's Martin Weidner commended the candy-style graphics but noted that they were outdated as the audio, criticizing its simplistic design. Super Play's Tony Mott criticized the visual design for being overly intricate and length but praised the audio and gameplay, regarding it as "A great shoot-'em-up with a style you almost want to hug." In a similar manner as Mott, Ralph Karels of German magazine Video Games also criticized the backgrounds for being overly detailed but commended the audio design. In contrast to the other reviewers, both Fabio Massa and Marco Del Bianco of the Italian publication Super Console praised the audiovisual presentation, playability and longevity.

Cotton 100% on Nintendo Switch garnered "mixed or average reviews", according to review aggregator site Metacritic.
