= Tales of Djungarian Hamster =

2021 video game

- Developer: Success
- Publisher: Success
- Director: Yasushi Saito
- Designer: Yasushi Saito
- Composer: Keisuke Suzuki
- Platform: Nintendo Switch
- Release: WW: May 20, 2021
- Genre: Pet simulation
- Mode: Single-player

Tales of Djungarian Hamster (じゃんがりあん物語, Jangarian Monagatari) is a 2021 pet simulation video game produced by Success Corporation for the Nintendo Switch. The game is based around hamsters and the goal is to raise a hamster and play with them to earn points for making new hamsters.

The game features over 30 types of djungarian hamsters with different colors and personalities, including unusual fur colors. Petting a hamster adds "Friend Points" which would then be used for matchmaking, leading to new hamsters being born incorporating certain features from its parents. The player can also create and exchange customized cages for them.

== Release ==
The game was released on May 20, 2021 worldwide on the Nintendo eShop and had a limited-print physical copy with other items in Japan. Tales of Djungarian Hamster became a success and led to Success forming a department in its development studio specifically for hamster themed games. A number of DLC were released for them; on November 30, 2023, Success released a deluxe edition with the four DLC packages included released as Jangarian Monogatari Derakkuchu in Japan.

== Reception ==
Famitsu scored the game 27 out of 40.

== See also ==
- Nintendogs
- Petz
