= Panorama Cotton =

1994 video game

- Developer: Success
- Publishers: Sunsoft: Mega Drive; JP: Sunsoft; NA: Strictly Limited Games ININ Games (NS, XB) United Games Entertainment (PS4)
- Director: Hideki Tamura
- Producer: Takato Yoshinari
- Programmer: Toshiyuki Kuwabara
- Artists: Hideki Tamura; Motoi Saito; Shinobu Itō
- Composer: Kenichi Hirata
- Series: Cotton
- Platforms: Sega Mega Drive, Nintendo Switch, PlayStation 4, Xbox One, Xbox Series X/S
- Release: Mega Drive: JP: 12 August 1994; WW: 29 October 2021; Switch: WW: 29 October 2021; AU: 30 October 2021; PlayStation 4: NA: 29 October 2021; Xbox One, Series X/S: WW: 7 December 2023
- Genre: Rail shooter
- Mode: Single-player

Panorama Cotton (Note: Japanese: パノラマコットン, Hepburn: Panorama Kotton) is a 1994 rail shooter video game developed by Success and published by Sunsoft for the Mega Drive exclusively in Japan on August 12, 1994. Panorama Cotton is the third entry in the Cotton series and made a major departure from the original gameplay formula of prior Cotton entries; instead of being a side-scrolling shooter like the others, it is a pseudo-3D shooter in the style of Sega's Space Harrier.

== Gameplay ==
Gameplay screenshot

Panorama Cotton is a pseudo-3D scrolling shooter reminiscent of Space Harrier, set in an anime-style fantasy world. Various levels scroll "into the screen", vertically, horizontally, or diagonally. The player can move Cotton over the screen, shooting at oncoming enemies and avoiding obstacles in her way. Cotton can upgrade her weapon to higher levels as the player progresses, and can also cast magical spells by collecting special items.

== Plot ==
The most important plot elements in all of the Cotton games are magical candies called Willows. In the previous and first installment of the series, Cotton: Fantastic Night Dreams, the world had fallen into an endless night after a Demoness called Wool stole the 7 Willows that brought light to it. In desperation, the Fairy Queen Velvet dispatched a beautiful fairy named Silk to get the Willows back. Before long, Silk met up with Cotton, a witch who loved to eat Willows, and together, they defeated Wool and brought back the willows. Light returned to the world, and Cotton left on her own.

Panorama Cotton's story begins when Silk's sister Knit comes to tell her that Queen Velvet has started saying things which do not make any sense. Later, the Queen reveals that she believes the world is falling into chaos, and she is the only one who can save it. She rides off on an animal called "Pinky" to save the day, and disappears before anyone can stop her. Perplexed, Silk and Knit deduce that a burnt Willow which recently turned up in the castle garden is responsible for the Queen's odd behavior. Apparently, monsters north of the kingdom have been burning any Willow they see. Before doing anything else, Silk immediately decides that she needs to get rid of the burnt Willow in the castle first.

Silk carries the burnt Willow far away, but before she can dispose of it, Cotton appears suddenly and snatches it from her. Not pausing for a moment to hear Silk's story, Cotton begins to eat the burnt Willow. However, she quickly spits it out, angry and disgusted. When Cotton discovers someone is burning Willows, she vows that she will not let it continue. From there, Silk and Cotton set off on their new adventure.

== Development and release ==
GameFan reported Sunsoft only produced 4,000 copies in total. An unofficial English translation patch was released in 2019. In 2021, ININ Games and Strictly Limited Games announced Panorama Cotton would be launched for Nintendo Switch and PlayStation 4 across western regions in digital and limited formats on October 29, marking the game's first official international appearance. The 2021 ports retained the original Mega Drive presentation while adding save states, a rewind function and unlockable cheats; the Japanese text used in the game's story sequences was not translated. In addition, the original Mega Drive version will also be released in western regions under a limited run of copies. It also released for Xbox One and Xbox Series X/S on December 7, 2023.

== Reception ==
Reception

Aggregate score
Aggregator	Score
Metacritic	(NS) 58/100

Review scores
Publication	Score
Beep! MegaDrive	(SMD) 6.75/10
Famitsu	(SMD) 21/40
Última Generación	(SMD) 58/100

Panorama Cotton received positive reception from critics and players. Mean Machines Sega's Marlon compared the game with both After Burner and Space Harrier, commending its fast pseudo-3D sprite-scaling visuals. Readers of the Japanese Sega Saturn Magazine voted to give the title a 8.0367 out of 10 score, ranking at the number 113 spot in a poll, indicating a large popular following. Gamers' Republic's Dave Halverson regarded it to be the "pinnacle of 3D shooting" on the Sega Mega Drive.
