= Izuna: Legend of the Unemployed Ninja =

2006 video game

- European box art
- Developer: Ninja Studio
- Publishers: JP: Success; NA: Atlus; EU: 505 Games
- Platform: Nintendo DS
- Release: JP: June 8, 2006; NA: February 20, 2007; EU: October 12, 2007
- Genres: Roguelike, dungeon crawler
- Mode: Single-player

Izuna: Legend of the Unemployed Ninja, known in Japan as Gōma Reifu Den Izuna (降魔霊符伝イヅナ; lit. "Devil-conquering Soul Talisman Legend Izuna") and in Europe as Izuna: The Legend of the Ninja, is a Nintendo DS dungeon crawler video game developed by Success and Ninja Studio and published by Atlus USA in the United States and by 505 Games in Europe. It was followed by a sequel, Izuna 2: The Unemployed Ninja Returns, in 2007.

== Plot ==
Izuna and her ninja clan are looking for a place to settle down after their old master Mugen decided that ninjas were obsolete, and booted them from his castle. Upon arriving at a village that's suitably out of the way for their "Grandboss", Gen-An, they decide to stay at an inn when Grandboss wanders off.

While trying to find Grandboss, Izuna manages to offend the gods of the village, and everyone in the area starts behaving strangely. Now Izuna has to descend into the various shrines for the gods in order to set things right.

== Characters ==
=== Izuna's group ===
- Izuna: A 16-year-old girl who was born and raised as a kunoichi. She's stubborn, and often doesn't listen to others. Izuna travels with the remainder of her recently unemployed clan, Gen-An, Shino, and Mitsumoto (whom she calls her slave).
- Shino: A girl whom Izuna looks up to like an older sister. More on the short tempered side than Izuna but is kind at heart, as read in the comic on the official site. She is referred to by Izuna as Shino-Sis (シノ姉, Shino-nee). Also has the dubious honor of being the DS's "first flat-chested character", according to the US official site.
- Gen-An: Formerly the leader of their ninja village, but now just the leader of their group of unemployed ninjas. The others in the group just refer to him as "Grandboss".
- Mitsumoto: The last member of the group, Izuna doesn't treat him with any respect, mostly because he doesn't stand up for himself and doesn't seem to have any real ninja abilities. His skirt-chasing tendencies probably do nothing to raise his esteem in Izuna's eyes.

=== Gods ===
- Shuuchi: The god of Earth, he follows a warrior's code and uses a sword as his weapon.
- Fuuka: The goddess of Wind, a calm and kind being. Legend says she has quite a temper that she uses to keep people in line.
- Kagen: The hot-blooded god of Fire, he is an "act first ask questions later" sort who can turn his forearms into claws.
- Suiren: The goddess of Water who is similar to Izuna in personality, and very mature despite her appearance.
- Utsuho: The god of air, very kind and cool in personality.
- Takushiki: The god of Consciousness. He hates dishonesty in all its forms yet keeps his own secrets from others. He is also the leader of the other five gods.

== Gameplay ==
Izuna is a dungeon crawler game with randomly generated dungeons, much like the Mystery Dungeon series. Inside the dungeons, gameplay is effectively turn-based, with monsters in the dungeon getting to move or attack every time Izuna moves a tile or takes an action. If Izuna should get KO'ed inside the dungeon, a passerby will bring her back to the village, but she will lose all the items and money she was holding, except for equipment with the Kikan talisman attached to it. However, after completing the first dungeon, the player is able to store items and money in a warehouse, allowing the storage of reserve weapons and items in case Izuna is KO'ed.

== Reception and legacy ==
Reception

Aggregate score
Aggregator	Score
Metacritic	66/100

Review scores
Publication	Score
1Up.com	B
Eurogamer	6/10
Game Informer	3.5/10
GamePro	3.5/5
GameSpot	6.7/10
GameZone	7.5/10
IGN	6.9/10
Nintendo Power	6.5/10
Nintendo World Report	6.5/10
X-Play	3/5

The game received "average" reviews according to video game review aggregator Metacritic. Some reviewers enjoyed the game's high difficulty and quirky storyline, while others panned the game for a perceived lack of depth, difficulty, and battling. Reviewers also noted that the game does not use any additional DS features, such as the microphone, touch-screen or Wi-Fi. The game did gain something of a cult following and was popular enough to spawn the sequel, Izuna 2: The Unemployed Ninja Returns.

Izuna and Shino appear in Success and Atlus' 2007 game Rondo of Swords as unlockable characters. Izuna additionally appears in Ninja Studio's fighting game Windy X Windam.

In September 2023, Success announced a new game in the series to be in development for release on Steam and Nintendo Switch.
