= Psyvariar =

Video game series

Psyvariar (サイヴァリア, Saivaria) is a vertically scrolling shooter arcade game series developed by Success Corporation on Taito's G-NET hardware. City Connection developed a port to consoles and PC titled Psyvariar Delta. A further enhanced arcade version titled Psyvariar Delta AC was developed by City Connection and released on exA-Arcadia in December 2020.

== Psyvariar: Medium Unit ==
Psyvariar: Medium Unit
- Developers: Success Corporation (arcade); Skonec Co., Ltd. (PS2)
- Publishers: Taito (arcade); Success Corporation (PS2)
- Composers: MR2151, Wasi303, Misako ADJUMY Sekiguchi, ORE808
- Platforms: Arcade, PlayStation 2
- Release: JP: March 2000 (arcade, MU); JP: 11 September 2003 (PS2, MU)
- Genre: Scrolling shooter
- Modes: Single-player, multiplayer
- Arcade system: Taito G-NET

=== Control ===
- Rolling: Rapidly moving the joystick in opposite directions. Rolling briefly increases moving speed.
- Rolling shot: The player must press fire button when rolling. In this firing mode, the fighter fires in concentrated forward formation for a brief moment.

=== Fighters ===
Fighter	AXION 001 (1st form)	AXION 002 (2nd form)	AXION 003 (3rd form)	? (4th form)	? (5th form)	? (final form)
Minimum level	none	8	17	33	54	88

Player's fighter has a hit box of 1x1 pixel at the centre of fighter.

In the beginning of a game, player's fighter is AXION 001. A fighter can gain levels by buzzing of destroying enemy units or buzzing. Once the fighter gains sufficient level, it changes form and its firing patterns are altered. Fighter's level is maintained between stages, lives, and credits.

=== Stages ===
There are six stages in each game. After completing Stage 1 (Area 1), player can choose the area within the higher numbered stage to be completed. More difficult (and higher-scoring) areas become selectable only if the fighter's level reaches the requirement before choosing next stage.

Stage	Required level
Area 2-C Valley	8
Area 3-B Cloud Bank	18
Area 4-C Asteroid Belt	26
Area 4-D Colony	32
Area 5-B Photon	38
Area 5-C Graviton	53
Area 6-B Gluon	52

If a stage is completed with only 1 credit, the high score for that area is saved in the game hardware's non-volatile memory, providing the score for that area is higher than previous record.

=== Buzz system ===
Each time an enemy unit or bullet gets very close to player's fighter without destroying player's fighter, a "buzz" occurs. For each buzz, the fighter gains experience (indicated by meter at the top of the screen). When the fighter gains sufficient experience, its level increases, and it becomes temporarily invulnerable. During that period, fighter can inflict damages to enemy units by colliding. Player can use this short period to risk buzzing more bullets to quickly reach the next level, or to avoid particularly difficult bullet patterns. The collision area for trigger buzz to occur is a circular area surrounding fighter's hit box, covering the fighter's body.

When buzzing causes the fighter to transform, the damage to nearby enemy units increase. If a fighter is rolling, the buzz radius increases, fighter's hit box is reduced, and the buzz collision detection is only done once every two frames.

== Psyvariar Revision ==
Psyvariar Revision
- Developers: Success Corporation (arcade, SoftBank); Skonec Co., Ltd. (PS2)
- Publishers: Taito (arcade); Success Corporation (PS2); Success Networks Corporation (YM, i-mode, EZweb)
- Composers: MR2151, Wasi303, Misako ADJUMY Sekiguchi, ORE808
- Platforms: Arcade, PlayStation 2, Yahoo Mobile (SoftBank), i-mode (DoCoMo), EZweb (au)
- Release: 2000-09-? (arcade, R); 2003-10-09 (PS2, R); 2004-07-02 (SoftBank ver. 2); 2004-10-03 (SoftBank); 2005-08-08 (i-mode); 2008-11-20 (au)
- Genre: Scrolling shooter
- Modes: Single-player, multiplayer
- Arcade system: Taito G-NET

Psyvariar Revision is an update to Psyvariar: Medium Unit. There are following changes:

- Added replay function, and an associated replay mode.
- Rearranged stages. Enemies fire denser and faster bullet patterns, especially bosses.
- Player-controllable fighters' graphics and firing patterns were changed.
- In boss battles, a life gauge is shown.
- A bullet can now be buzzed as many times as possible, which allows much higher scores and levels.
- Rolling can be performed by holding bomb button when the bomb stock is empty.
- Added Internet ranking (closed as of March 2001).

=== Normal mode ===
At the end of each stage, the game shows following statistics:

- Destruction rate: The percentage of enemy units destroyed using current credit. If the value is 100, player gains 1 bomb.
- Destruction bonus: Player gains 10000 points for every percentage.
- Max BUZZ chain: The maximum amount of buzz is obtained with current credit in the completed stage, compared to buzz obtained with all the lives spent in the stage.
- Total BUZZ: Total amount of buzz is obtained with current credit in the completed stage.
- BUZZ bonus: Player gains 500 points for every buzz in Max BUZZ chain and Total BUZZ fields.
- Stage total: Total bonus points player gained in the completed stage.

=== Replay mode ===
Replay mode allows player to choose a stage for which a high score is available. Player can watch a replay for the chosen stage before playing. Player can choose up to 5 areas per game. When player starts a stage, player has the same number of fighters as the one in the replay stage. Unlike Normal mode, if player loses all lives in a stage, the game cannot be continued.

=== Fighters ===
Fighter	AXION 001? (1st form)	AXION 002? (2nd form))	AXION 003? (3rd form)	? (4th form)	? (5th form)	? (6th form)	? (final form)
Minimum level	none	16	40	80	128	192	256

=== Stages ===
In Normal mode, there are 4-8 stages in each game, depending on the fighter's level. In addition to the branching system in Psyvariar: Medium Unit, after completing area 2, 3, or 4 with very high fighter level, the next stage becomes a danger stage (Area X), where the type of X-area depends on fighter's level. An X-area can only be played one time per game, with easier X-area played first. After completing an X-area stage, the next selectable stage is a higher numbered area (if one remains). If the 3rd X-area stage (stage 7) is completed with sufficient fighter level, the next stage is Area X-D. If a sufficiently high fighter level is not achieved the game will end after stage X-B.

Stage	Required level
Area 2-C Valley	16
Area 2-D Volcano	24
Area 3-B Cloud Bank	24
Area 3-C City	80
Area 4-B Zero Space	45
Area 4-C Colony	96
Area X-A Photon	56
Area X-B Graviton	118
Area X-C Weakboson	163
Area X-D Gluon	218

If a stage is completed with only 1 credit, not only the high score of the area is saved, but also the replay for that area, providing the score for that area is higher than previous record. Once a replay for that area is saved, it becomes available in Replay mode.

In replay mode, there are following extra stages:

- Area XXA (Photon-X)
- Area XXB (Graviton-X)
- Area XXC (Weakboson-X)
- Area XXD (Gluon-X)

Area XX stage can only be played by completing Area X-D in Replay mode. Once X-D has been completed, all Area XX stages become selectable. The Area XX stages are similar in design to their Area X counterparts but they have an increased number of enemies that fire denser bullet patterns.

=== SoftBank, DoComo, au versions ===
Those versions included only 11 areas, but internet ranking was integrated into the phone service. Replays could be transferred between players.

== Psyvariar: Complete Edition ==
Psyvariar: Complete Edition
- European cover art
- Developers: Skonec Co., Ltd.
- Publishers: Success Corporation; Xplosiv (EU)
- Composers: MR2151, Wasi303, Misako ADJUMY Sekiguchi, ORE808
- Platforms: PlayStation 2, PlayStation Network
- Release: PlayStation 2: JP: March 28, 2002 (CE, SSB, SCB); EU: September 29, 2003 (CE); PlayStation Network: JP: April 17, 2013 (CE)
- Genre: Scrolling shooter
- Modes: Single-player, multiplayer

Psyvariar: Complete Edition is a compilation that contains both Psyvariar: Medium Unit and Psyvariar Revision.

New features include:

- Option to use a separate button to roll.
- Secret Lab Jukebox.
- Ability to display hit boxes.
- Ability to unlock new stages for Replay Mode after completing current higher areas (starting from Area 2-C, then Area 3-B onwards for remaining stages).
- Replay Mode is now available on both Psyvariar: Medium Unit and Psyvariar Revision, while in the Arcade version it is only available for Psyvariar Revision.

Two special editions were also available in Japan. The Special Sound Box included an audio CD of the game's soundtrack, and the Special Capture Box included a gameplay DVD of both games being fully completed by expert players. The PlayStation 2 versions of the individual games were later released separately as budget range titles.

The European version retained all the features of the Japanese release and includes a 60 Hz mode.

=== Reception ===
On release, Famitsu magazine scored the game a 30 out of 40.

== Soundtracks ==
PSYVARIAR "THE MIX" is a remixed soundtrack published by Egg Music Records.

== Psyvariar Delta ==
Psyvariar Delta
- Developer: City Connection
- Publisher: City Connection
- Composers: MR2151, Wasi303, Misako ADJUMY Sekiguchi, ORE808
- Platforms: Arcade, PlayStation 4, Nintendo Switch
- Release: PlayStation 4: JP: August 30, 2018; Switch: JP: August 30, 2018; Windows: WW: January 30, 2019; exA-Arcadia: WW: December 2020
- Genre: Scrolling shooter
- Modes: Single-player, multiplayer

Psyvariar Delta is a compilation that contains both Psyvariar: Medium Unit and Psyvariar Revision as well as new remixed Delta stages and soundtrack. All ships can be used in each game play mode. Blanche, a mech robot from the Jaleco game, Cybattler, is selectable as DLC.

=== Psyvariar Delta AC ===
AC is an enhanced arcade version released on exA-Arcadia in December 2020. All of the boss patterns have been redesigned by super player, Chantake. Blanche from Cybattler has been rebalanced for arcade scoring. Input latency has been reduced to one frame using exA-Arcadia technology.

== See also ==
- Psyvariar 2
