= Rondo of Swords =

2007 video game

- North American box art
- Developer: Success
- Publisher: Atlus
- Director: Masahiro Tani
- Producer: Masayuki Suzuki
- Designers: Kazuyoshi Horikawa; Hiroyuki Okuno
- Programmers: Kenji Sumi; Yuki Kitamura; Daisuke Tanihara; Takaaki Yagi
- Writer: Naohito Kosaka
- Composers: Atsushi Fukase; Tatsuya Fujiwara
- Platform: Nintendo DS
- Release: JP: August 9, 2007; NA: April 15, 2008
- Genre: Tactical role-playing
- Mode: Single-player

Rondo of Swords, known in Japan as Rondo of Deception, (Note: Japanese: 偽りの輪舞曲, Hepburn: Itsuwari no Rondo) is a strategy role-playing video game developed by Success and published by Atlus for the Nintendo DS. The game was released in Japan on August 9, 2007, and in North America on April 15, 2008.

== Gameplay ==
Throughout the course of the game players recruit a variety of characters, some of whom may not be able to participate in battle. The player can send inactive party members to do various chores. These activities range from buying supplies to entering the player into various quests.

Rondo uses a battle system known as the "Route Maneuver System." Players set a character's course through an area. If enemies counterattack, or block an attack, that character's advance will be stopped. Players can also attack multiple in one move. However, the character's path cannot double back.

Each person has a unique special ability called an OverBreak or OB. These OBs may be one of several types such as attack or supportive. Some characters have abilities that do not fall into either of these categories. OBs also have three ranks. As the player directs characters to attack enemies, the ranks will continue to increase. At the third ranking (or level), each character can unleash the OB's most powerful effect.

Players will earn Skill points throughout the game, which in turn lets them purchase various skills. These include Magic and Supportive skills that are unique to each character. However, not only will characters will be able to purchase new skills, but also they will get to strengthen the ones they already have. They earn skill points by leveling up.

Completing certain events or tasks will net gamers various endings. Players will endure various trials to show their strength and overall prowess. They will be awarded various items necessary to change their job class plus increase their overall potential.

== Reception ==
Rondo of Swords

Review scores
Publication	Score
1Up.com	B-
GamesRadar+	5/10
IGN	6.8/10
Nintendo Power	65%
Nintendo World Report	8/10
Play	8/10

Rondo has an average of 69% on Metacritic and 73% on GameRankings, review aggregator sites. IGN called Rondo "A simple, challenging, entertaining turn-based strategy that dares to be different, and succeeds despite its flaws." 1UP.com criticised and praised the game's difficulty level, stating "When the game's at its best, a hard-fought victory feels like a tremendous accomplishment...and at worst, it feels arbitrary and unfair." Games Radar criticised the presentation, saying "The biggest problem with Rondo of Swords is that it isn't as polished as its peers..." Nintendo Power also criticised the difficulty level, "The triumphs may be sweet, but the aggravations have them outnumbered." Nintendo World Report said of the game "The intense difficulty of the new battle system combined with more traditional RPG traits turns out to be great fun, but tricky." Play praised the battles as the best part of the game, stating "it is here that the true potential of this title shines brightest."
