= Izuna 2: The Unemployed Ninja Returns =

2007 video game

- North American box art, featuring Izuna
- Developer: Ninja Studio
- Publishers: JP: Success; NA: Atlus
- Platform: Nintendo DS
- Release: JP: November 29, 2007; NA: July 22, 2008
- Genre: Dungeon crawler
- Mode: Single-player

Izuna 2: The Unemployed Ninja Returns, released in Japan as Gōma Reifu Den Izuna Ni (降魔霊符伝イヅナ 弐), is a dungeon crawler video game developed by Ninja Studio and published in Japan by Success and in North America by Atlus for the Nintendo DS handheld game console. It is the sequel to Izuna: Legend of the Unemployed Ninja and was released in Japan on November 29, 2007 and in North America on July 22, 2008.

Like the first game, Izuna 2 focuses on the adventures of Izuna and her friends. Shino, Izuna's friend, disappears in the midst of a wedding, so Izuna goes on a quest to find her. Izuna finds her, only to discover that Shino was looking for her sister, Shizune, so Izuna and her group decide to help search for Shizune. By looking for Shizune, Izuna angers a group of foreign gods, who attempt to prevent her from reuniting with Shizune.

== Gameplay ==
Gameplay in Izuna 2 showing the player exploring a dungeon.

Izuna 2, like the original Izuna game, is a dungeon crawler. The player controls Izuna or various other characters and explores randomly generated dungeons. Each dungeon has multiple floors that need to be cleared, and many of these dungeons have bosses that must be defeated. The player manages a health bar; if the health bar is depleted, the player dies and is forced to return to town. Dying, a common occurrence in the game, will cause the player to lose all money and items being carried, though the player will not lose experience or levels. The health bar refills continuously every turn. To prevent players from remaining in place to restore health excessively, an "SP bar" was added. It constantly depletes per turn and a depleted SP bar decreases the player's attack power. The game is turn-based; the player can perform an action, such as moving, using an item, or attacking, and every other enemy in the dungeon will perform an action as well. The game includes many role-playing video game elements, such as equippable items, stats, and experience points to level up.

Equipment, items, and talismans can be found in dungeons. Their location and effects are randomly generated. Equipment comes in several classes: melee equipment such as swords, claws, arms, dolls, and boots, or ranged weapons such as boomerangs and bows. Items come in several types including pills, shuriken, kunai knives, bombs, caltrops, and restorative items that heal health or SP. Talismans can "stick," or be attached, to equipment to add abilities or stats. A weapon can only have a limited number of talismans stuck to it. Talismans can also be used to cast magic, which uses SP.

Izuna 2 also includes a "tag" system not found in the previous game. The player enters dungeons with two characters, allowing the player to continue exploring the dungeon even after the first character has died. The player can switch characters in game during a fight through this system. Additionally, the player can use the secondary character in conjunction with the primary character to launch a powerful dual attack.

== Plot ==
Ichika, a fisherwoman from the previous game, has plans to get married, but during the night before Ichika's marriage, Shino, Izuna's best friend, disappears. Izuna frantically tries to find her and quickly locates her. Shino reveals that she was searching for her sister, Shizune, so Izuna and her friends decide to help Shino find Shizune.

Izuna enlists the help of the gods of Katamari Village, whom she aided in the previous game. Lord Takushiki, one of the gods, reveals that both Shizune and Izuna are "portable shrines", or people who allow the gods to leave their home villages. Because the existence of two portable shrines in one area would cause conflict among gods, Takushiki sent Shizune to another region as a child. The foreign gods and their creatures from that region, mononokes, followed Shizune into Izuna's homeland.

After defeating several foreign gods, Izuna successfully reunites Shino and Shizune, but by defeating the foreign gods, Izuna angers the Dark Prince, the leader of these gods. Izuna is forced to defeat the Dark Prince. After doing so, she convinces him to return to his homeland, allowing peace to return to the region.

== Development ==
According to the developer blog, the localization process for Izuna 2 was "surprisingly uncomplicated" and the original run through took less than a month. Success, the Japanese developer, provided Atlus, the North American developers, with well-organized files, which helped make the translation and editing quick and easy. However, the quality assurance and debugging process was a "nightmare" due to the nature of the game and the randomized spawning of creatures. Additionally, the team looked closely at the bugs found by Japanese players and attempted to replicate every reported bug. This effort was marred by the lack of a debug menu, though debuggers were able to use both a one-hit kill option and a floor-skipping option, but the one-hit kill option did not apply to the bosses, so debuggers still had to grind to gain enough levels to defeat the bosses. In total, six official testers found 104 system-type bugs and 259 text bugs.

== Release ==
On the Japanese release date of Izuna 2, Success organized a series of fashion events at various stores in Akihabara. Cosplayers could compete for prizes by dressing up as either Izuna or Shino. Additionally, actors and members of the design staff attended to field questions and sign autographs. The game was also made available at Comiket 73 between December 21-23, 2007.

Atlus released an English version of the game in July 2008 in North America.

=== Merchandise ===
Izuna 2 was released in several different containers. Sofmap, a Japanese retailer, released a collector's box depicting Izuna and Shino bathing in an onsen, mirroring the design of many eroge games. Each American release contained one of two pinup-styled mini-posters of Izuna. Copies of the game purchased through either GameStop or Amazon each included an additional, retailer-exclusive mini-poster.

== Reception ==
Reception

Aggregate score
Aggregator	Score
Metacritic	65/100

Review scores
Publication	Score
1Up.com	B−
Destructoid	7/10
GamePro	3.5/5
GamesRadar+	3/5
GameZone	7.4/10
IGN	6/10
NGamer	63%
Nintendo Power	5/10
Nintendo World Report	6/10
X-Play	4/5

Izuna 2 received "mixed or average reviews" according to video game review aggregator Metacritic. Many critics pointed to the game's "quintessential roguelike RPG" nature as a drawback because it required a great deal of grinding to progress in the game, though some critics enjoyed the difficulty of the game.

Reviewers were also split with their impressions of the "tag" system. GameShark found it to be a "nice twist" while RPGFan found it to be "irrelevant and not good". Nintendo World Report called Izuna 2 "a respectable and fun dungeon-crawler" marred mostly by its gameplay mechanics and disappointing graphics. They also pointed out that the game is targeted at a "very specific gamer crowd". Likewise, GamePro commented that the game "might prove too challenging to casual DS gamers who are just looking for a quick round of fun" and would most likely fit best for "DS owners looking for a hardcore dungeon crawling experience". In spite of this, they found that the game had several notable positive aspects, including a "solid" control scheme and "well done" Japanese voice acting and English subtitling. X-Play pointed to the game's "original visual style and a quirky sense of humor" as characteristics that distinguished the game from roguelikes. They greatly enjoyed the dialogue and voice acting and felt that the game "shouldn't get lost" among other dungeon crawlers released to the DS. However, 1UP.com found that the "amusingly slapstick storyline" was the only point that stood out against dungeon crawlers, though the game was "a considerable improvement" over the original. In general, 1UP.com thought the game was "a challenge meant for hardcore RPG fanatics but amusing enough that newcomers might find it worthwhile, too". Likewise, IGN commented that the game would take "a very specific gamer to cuddle up to this cute, comedic experience" and pointed out that the game was "most unlikely" of sequels. In contrast to 1UP.com, IGN found the game to be more of the same, leading to the same benefits and drawbacks.
