= Cotton 2: Magical Night Dreams =

1997 video game

- Developer: Success
- Publishers: Tecmo; Success (Saturn)
- Producer: Takato Yoshinari
- Designer: Masahiro Fukuda
- Programmer: Masaru Hatsuyama
- Artists: Hitoshi Nishimura; Liu Xiangdong; Toshihisa Katsuki
- Composer: Kenichi Hirata
- Series: Cotton
- Platforms: Arcade, Sega Saturn
- Release: Arcade: JP: November 1997; Sega Saturn: JP: 4 December 1997
- Genre: Scrolling shooter
- Modes: Single-player, multiplayer
- Arcade system: ST-V

Cotton 2: Magical Night Dreams (Note: Japanese: コットン2: マジカルナイトドリームス, Hepburn: Kotton 2: Majikaru Naito Dorīmusu) is a 1997 scrolling shooter arcade video game developed by Success and published by Tecmo. The fourth installment in the Cotton franchise, it is the arcade sequel to Cotton: Fantastic Night Dreams. In the game, the player assumes the role of either the titular young witch or her rival Appli who, alongside their companions Silk and Needle, sets out on a quest to defeat several monsters and return the missing "Bluewater Willow" candy to Pumpkin Kingdom. The gameplay is similar to the first game, consisting of shooting mixed with fighting and role-playing elements using a main three-button configuration. It ran on the ST-V hardware.

Headed by Takato Yoshinari, Cotton 2 was developed by members at Success who previously worked on the original Cotton. The game was later ported to Sega Saturn. In 1998, a remixed arcade edition titled Cotton Boomerang: Magical Night Dreams was released by Tecmo with additional characters, new gameplay and scoring systems, as well as altered stages and visuals. Both Cotton 2 and Cotton Boomerang were met with positive reception from critics since their release on Saturn, most of which reviewed them as import titles, for being faithful conversions of the arcade originals.

== Gameplay ==
Arcade version screenshot.

Cotton 2: Magical Night Dreams is a scrolling shooter game similar to Cotton: Fantastic Night Dreams. The player assumes the role of young witch Cotton or her rival Appil, who alongside their companions, the fairy Silk and the hat Needle, travel across seven increasingly difficult stages through a magical dream-like world on a quest to defeat several monsters and return the missing "Bluewater Willow" candy to Pumpkin Kingdom.

As with its predecessor, the player must blast various monsters and avoid being shot while collecting elemental crystal power-ups to enhance Cotton and Appli's weaponry in a similar manner as Soldier Blade to unleash strong magic spells on enemies. The color of these crystals can be changed by shooting them, which determines Cotton and Appli's primary weapon. Deploying these crystals for a magic spell decreases the firepower of each character. The game incorporates some role-playing elements from the original Cotton, as the player is able to improve their attack up to 5 levels, but excludes gameplay mechanics like the charge attacks and fairy abilities.

New to Cotton 2 are the introduction of a lifebar for each character to sustain multiple hits and fighting game elements. The player can perform "command" shots by executing a combination of directional and button-based commands to fire in multiple directions. The player can also pick up enemies and their shots to throw them around to destroy other enemies by performing one of the "command" shots to seal them into an orb. Trapped enemies may also be used as a shield. The orb behaves differently based on the currently equipped elemental magic. Keeping it on-screen and scoring chain combos is crucial to achieve high scores, as it grant points by turning into a bubble depending on the number of defeated enemies after falling off-screen or hitting a strong enemy. The player can also shoot the orb to reveal health items.

== Development and release ==
Cotton 2: Magical Night Dreams was first released in Japanese arcades in November 1997 by Tecmo, running on the ST-V board.

Cotton 2: Magical Night Dreams was created by members at Success who previously worked on Cotton: Fantastic Night Dreams, with Takato Yoshinari heading its development as producer. Both Masahiro Fukuda and Masaru Hatsuyama returned as chief designer and programmers respectively. Artists Hiroyuki Hasegawa, Hitoshi Nishimura, Liu Xiangdong and Toshihisa Katsuki were responsible for character and monster designs, as well as backgrounds. The music was composed by Kenichi Hirata. Other companies such as Ken Production and Ishigaki Production also collaborated as production supporters.

The idea for the game design of Cotton 2 came about after the president of Success asked Masahiro Fukuda what he would like in a Cotton game. This led the development team to give the game a more action-focused design, with elements that they all liked in video games at the time. In particular, the command shots and the throwing/catching system were inspired by Takashi Egawano's obsession with Virtua Fighter. Sol Divide was also a direct inspiration for the game. The choice to develop the arcade version on Sega's ST-V hardware was because it felt like a natural progression from Cotton: Fantastic Night Dreams running on Sega's System 16 hardware, and to enable easy, arcade-perfect porting to the Sega Saturn. Masaru Hatsuyama's familiarity with the hardware was also a contributing factor to using Sega hardware. The decision to design the character of Appli Ki Pumpkin was made for the game's requirement to be played with a co-op aspect. When it was heard that Hideki Tamura, the character designer for Cotton, wanted the cutscenes to be manga-like, Masahiro Fukuda made a demo and it stuck later on. The backgrounds for the game were all paintings, and were very large to the point where streaming had to be used to make it fit in RAM. To import the backgrounds into the game, Liu Xiangdong scanned them all digitally, and edited them with PhotoShop on a Mac. For the fifth stage, where it references Cotton: Fantastic Night Dreams via its stage layout and enemies, Kenichi Hirata made a melody for the stage based on that game's soundtrack. However, he lost the source data he used for the original game, so he had to recompose it all by ear and outsource some of it in the process.

The game's location test in Sega's Akihabara arcades did mostly well, even having developers pretend to be players to show others how to play. However, there were quite a few people that wanted to play it as a shooter due to the previous Cotton game, and dismissed the new command shots because of it.

=== Conversions ===
On December 4, 1997, Cotton 2 received a conversion for the Sega Saturn published by Success in Japan, featuring an exclusive "Saturn" mode and new control options. Prior to launch, the Saturn version of Cotton 2 was unveiled at the September 1997 Tokyo Game Show just days after the game was released in arcades. On October 28, 1998, a Cotton 2-themed desktop accessories collection titled Cotton 2 Tenkomori was published by Success for Windows 95 and Windows 98 computers.

A remixed arcade edition dubbed Cotton Boomerang: Magical Night Dreams was released in Japanese arcades by Tecmo in September 1998, running on the ST-V board as Cotton 2 featuring additional characters, new gameplay and scoring systems, as well as altered stage layouts and visuals. On October 8, 1998, Cotton Boomerang received a version for the Saturn published by Success in Japan, featuring an art gallery and the same new control options as the Cotton 2 port on Saturn.

In September 2021, the Saturn versions of Cotton 2 and Cotton Boomerang were included alongside Guardian Force (1998) as part of the Cotton Guardian Force Saturn Tribute compilation for Nintendo Switch, PC and PlayStation 4 with added features like online rankings. ININ Games and Strictly Limited Games later announced that the compilation would be launched in western regions under two editions, while Cotton 2 was published worldwide by City Connection as a separate digital release from the compilation for PS4 and Switch on September 30, 2021, marking the game's first international appearance. City Connection announced an incoming patch that addresses frame lag issues in the collection. In 2022, City Connection revealed that the compilation will be ported to PC.

== Reception ==
Reception

Review scores
Publication	Score
Famitsu	(SS) 7/10, 6/10, 6/10, 6/10 (Boomerang) 27/40
Joypad	(SS) 91%
Super Game Power	(SS) 4/5 (Boomerang) 4/5
Video Games (DE)	(Boomerang) 75%
Ação Games	(SS) 8,0/10
Saturn Fan	(SS) 6.6/10 (Boomerang) 21/30
Sega Saturn Magazine	(SS) 7.00/10 (Boomerang) 7.0/10

Cotton 2: Magical Night Dreams, as well as Cotton Boomerang: Magical Night Dreams, were met with positive reception from critics since their release on Sega Saturn. According to Famitsu, the Saturn conversion of Cotton 2 sold over 8,907 copies in its first week on the market. Readers of the Japanese Sega Saturn Magazine voted to give the Saturn versions of both Cotton 2 and Cotton Boomerang scores of a 8.6363 and 8.2857 out of 10, ranking at the number 180 and 301 spots respectively, indicating a large popular following.

During its showing at the 1997 Tokyo Game Show, the European Sega Saturn Magazine regarded the Saturn version of Cotton 2: Magical Night Dreams as a "High quality arcade conversion of a very polished two-player action shoot 'em up." Ação Games's Ronny Marinoto reviewed the Saturn version of Cotton 2 and praised the colorful visuals, fast gameplay and audio, while regarding its challenge as interesting and fun. German magazine Fun Generation regarded the Saturn port as playable and commended its co-op mode, stating that it adds "additional appeal to present the game as a party gag."

Super Game Power's Marcelo Kamikaze and Marjorie Bros also reviewed the Saturn ports of both Cotton 2 and Cotton Boomerang respectively and gave positive remarks to its audiovisual presentation, controls, fun factor and originality. Video Games's Wolfgang Schaedle reviewed the Saturn release of Cotton Boomerang as well, highlighting the precise controls and 2D graphics, stating that "Action fans who like an uncomplicated shooting game principle are well served with Cotton Boomerang."
