= Success (company) =

Japanese video game developer

Success Corporation
- Native name: 株式会社サクセス
- Romanized name: Kabushiki gaisha Sakusesu
- Type: Kabushiki gaisha
- Industry: Video games
- Founded: 7 June 1978; 47 years ago
- Founder: Yoshinari Takato
- Headquarters: Tokyo, Japan
- Area served: Japan
- Products: Cotton series
- Number of employees: 263 (2019)
- Website: success-corp.co.jp

Success Corporation (株式会社サクセス, Kabushiki gaisha Sakusesu) is a Japanese video game and online game developer and publisher, based in Shinagawa, Tokyo, and founded on 7 June 1978. It is best known for its Cotton series of shooter games, Zoo Keeper and others.

== History ==
In 2022, Success spun out its pachinko and pachislot operations into the separate company Success Plus. Success Plus was subsequently acquired by Cave in 2024.

== Games developed and/or published ==
Year	Title	Platform	Developer(s)	Publisher(s)	Ref.
1991	Cotton: Fantastic Night Dreams	Arcade, TurboGrafx-CD, X68000, PlayStation, Neo Geo Pocket Color	Success Corporation	Sega, Hudson Soft, Electronic Arts	
1994	Cotton 100%	Super Famicom, PlayStation	Success Corporation	Datam Polystar	
1994	Panorama Cotton	Sega Mega Drive	Success Corporation	Sunsoft	
1995	Hebereke's Popoitto	PlayStation, Sega Saturn	Success Corporation	Sunsoft	
1995	Makeruna! Makendō 2: Kimero Youkai Souri	Super Famicom, PlayStation	Success Corporation, Opus Studio	Datam Polystar	
1995	RPG Tsukuru: Super Dante	Super Famicom	Success Corporation, Kuusou Kagaku	ASCII Entertainment	
1996	RPG Tsukuru 2	Super Famicom	Success Corporation, Kuusou Kagaku	ASCII Entertainment	
1996	Ongaku Tsukuru Kanadeeru	Super Famicom	Success Corporation	ASCII Entertainment	
1996	Sound Novel Tsukuru	Super Famicom	Success Corporation	ASCII Entertainment	
1996	3D Shooting Tsukuru	PlayStation	ASCII Entertainment, Success Corporation	ASCII Entertainment	
1996	Virtua Fighter 2	Sega Mega Drive	Gaibrain, Success Corporation	Sega	
1997	Sound Novel Tsukuru 2	PlayStation, Sega Saturn	Success Corporation	ASCII Entertainment	
1997	RPG Tsukuru 3	PlayStation	Success Corporation, Kuusou Kagaku	ASCII Entertainment	
1997	Cotton 2: Magical Night Dreams	Arcade, Sega Saturn	Success Corporation	Success Corporation	
1998	Ongaku Tsukuru Kanadeeru 2	PlayStation	Success Corporation	ASCII Entertainment	
1998	Apocalypse	PlayStation	Neversoft	Activision, Success Corporation^{JP}	
1998	Guardian Force	Arcade, Sega Saturn	Success Corporation	Success Corporation	
1998	Cotton Boomerang: Magical Night Dreams	Arcade, Sega Saturn	Success Corporation	Success Corporation	
1999	Battle Hunter	PlayStation	Success Corporation	Success Corporation^{JP}, Agetec^{NA}, Midas Interactive Entertainment^{PAL}	
1999	Castrol Honda Superbike Racing (SuperLite 1500 Series)	PlayStation	Midas Interactive Entertainment	Electronic Arts^{NA}, THQ^{PAL}, Success Corporation^{JP}	
1999	Super Casino Special (SuperLite 1500 Series)	PlayStation	Coconuts Japan	Success Corporation, Midas Interactive Entertainment^{PAL}	
2000	Playskool® Genius Quiz Machine	Microsoft Windows, Mac OS	Success Corporation	Hasbro Interactive	
2000	Psyvariar -Medium Unit-	Arcade, PlayStation 2	Success Corporation (Arcade), SKONEC Entertainment (PS2)	Taito (Arcade), Success Corporation (PS2)	
2000	Rainbow Cotton	Dreamcast	Success Corporation	Success Corporation	
2000	Sanvein	PlayStation	Success Corporation	Success Corporation^{JP}, Midas Interactive Entertainment^{PAL}, A1 Games^{NA}	
2000	Tom and Jerry in House Trap	PlayStation	Warthog Games	Ubisoft^{PAL, NA}, NewKidCo^{NA}, Success Corporation^{JP}	
2001	Mat Hoffman's Pro BMX	PlayStation	Shaba Games	Activision, Success Corporation^{JP}	
2001	Salaryman Champ	Arcade, PlayStation	Success Corporation	Konami	
2001	Spider-Man 2: Enter Electro	PlayStation	Vicarious Visions	Activision, Success Corporation^{JP}	
2001	Supercar Street Challenge	PlayStation 2	Exakt Entertainment	Activision, Success Corporation^{JP}	
2001	Tokyo Bus Annai	PlayStation 2	Fortyfive	Success Corporation	
2002	Bistro Cupid	Xbox	Firedog Creative Company Limited	Success Corporation	
2002	Hakoniwa Tetsudou: Blue Train Tokkyuuhen	PlayStation 2	Success Corporation	Success Corporation	
2002	Mageru Tsukeru Hahiiru: Ore * Dead Heat	PlayStation 2	Success Corporation	Success Corporation	
2002	Shine: Kotoba o Tsumuide	PlayStation 2	Vridge	Success Corporation	
2002	Super Trucks	PlayStation 2	Jester Interactive	Jester Interactive^{EU}, XS Games^{NA}, Success Corporation^{JP}	
2002	Ungra Walker	PlayStation	Success Corporation	Success Corporation	
2003	Angelic Concert	PlayStation 2	Kogado Studio	Success Corporation	
2003	Bistro Cupid 2	Xbox, PlayStation 2	Firedog Creative Company Limited	Success Corporation	
2003	Magical Pachinko Cotton	Pachinko, PlayStation 2	Success Corporation	Success Corporation	
2003	Metal Gear Solid 2: Substance	Windows	Konami Computer Entertainment Japan, Success Corporation (Windows)	Konami	
2003	Psyvariar -Complete Edition-	PlayStation 2, PlayStation Network	SKONEC Entertainment	Success Corporation^{JP}, Xplosiv^{PAL}	
2003	Psyvariar 2: The Will to Fabricate	Arcade, Dreamcast	Success Corporation (Arcade), SKONEC Entertainment (PS2)	Taito (Arcade), Success Corporation (DC)	
2003	Waku Waku Volley 2	PlayStation 2	Art Co. Ltd, Aqua Rouge	Success Corporation, Agetec	
2003	Zoo Keeper	Game Boy Advance, PlayStation 2, Nintendo DS, iOS, Android, Nintendo 3DS	Robot Communications (Web), Success Corporation (PS2, NDS, N3DS), KITERETSU (iOS, Android)	Ignition Entertainment	
2004	Akai Ito	PlayStation 2	Success Corporation	Success Corporation	
2004	Psyvariar 2: Extend Edition	Xbox	SKONEC Entertainment	Success Corporation	
2004	Psyvariar 2: Ultimate Final	PlayStation 2	SKONEC Entertainment	Success Corporation	
2004	SpinDrive Ping Pong	PlayStation 2	Success Corporation	Success Corporation, Empire Interactive^{PAL}	
2004	Yoshinoya	PlayStation 2	Success Corporation	Success Corporation	
2005	Loop Sequencer: Music Generator	PlayStation 2	Jester Interactive	Success Corporation	
2005	Metal Saga	PlayStation 2	Success Corporation, Crea-Tech	Success Corporation^{JP}, Atlus^{NA}	
2005	Panzertales: World Tank Museum for Game	PlayStation 2	Success Corporation	Success Corporation	
2005	Tokyo Bus Annai 2	PlayStation 2	Success Corporation	Success Corporation	
2006	Rhythm 'n Notes	Microsoft Windows, Mac OS	Success Corporation	Tiger Aspect Productions	
2006	Game Center USA: Midway Arcade Treasures	PlayStation 2	Midway	Success Corporation	
2006	Honoo no Takuhaibin	PlayStation 2	Success Corporation	Success Corporation	
2006	Izuna: Legend of the Unemployed Ninja	Nintendo DS	Success Corporation, Ninja Studio	Success Corporation^{JP}, Atlus^{NA}, 505 Games^{PAL}	
2006	Metal Saga: Hagane no Kisetsu	Nintendo DS	Crea-Tech	Success Corporation	
2006	Tensei Hakkenshi Fuumaroku	PlayStation 2	Vridge	Success Corporation	
2006	Touch Detective	Nintendo DS	BeeWorks	Success Corporation^{JP}, Atlus^{NA}, 505 Games^{PAL}	
2006	Wrestle Angels: Survivor	PlayStation 2	Success Corporation	Success Corporation	
2006	Rhythm 'n Notes (DS)	Nintendo DS	Success Corporation	Success Corporation^{JP}, Agetec^{NA}, 505 Games^{PAL}	
2007	Go! Go! Minon	Wii	Red Entertainment	Success Corporation^{JP}, Nordcurrent^{PAL}, UFO Interactive Games^{NA}	
2007	Izuna 2: The Unemployed Ninja Returns	Nintendo DS	Ninja Studio	Success Corporation^{JP}, Atlus^{NA}	
2007	Operation Darkness	Xbox 360	Success Corporation	Success Corporation^{JP}, Atlus^{NA}	
2007	Rondo of Swords	Nintendo DS	Success Corporation	Atlus	
2007	Drone Tactics	Nintendo DS	Success Corporation	Success Corporation^{JP}, Atlus^{NA}	
2007	Shanghai	Wii	Sunsoft	Success Corporation	
2007	Touch Detective 2 ½	Nintendo DS	BeeWorks	Success Corporation^{JP}, Atlus^{NA}, 505 Games^{PAL}	
2008	Aoi Shiro	PlayStation 2, Windows	Success Corporation	Success Corporation	
2008	Exception for NESiCAxLive	Windows, Arcade (2011)	Primitive, Success Corporation (Arcade)	Primitive, Success Corporation (Arcade)	
2008	Raiden Fighters Aces	Xbox 360	Success Corporation	Success Corporation^{JP}, Valcon Games^{NA}	
2008	Shepherd's Crossing	PlayStation 2	Success Corporation	Success Corporation^{JP}, Atlus^{NA}	
2008	Stranglehold	Xbox 360, Windows, PlayStation 3	Midway Chicago, Tiger Hill Entertainment	Midway Games, Success Corporation^{JP}	
2008	Tactical Guild	Nintendo DS	Ninja Studio	Success Corporation	
2008	The Dark Spire	Nintendo DS	Success Corporation	Success Corporation^{JP}, Atlus^{NA}	
2008	Wrestle Angels: Survivor 2	PlayStation 2	Success Corporation	TRYFIRST	
2010	Windy X Windam	Nintendo DS	Success Corporation	Success Corporation^{JP}, Graffiti Entertainment^{NA}	
2011	Dragon Dance for NESiCAxLive	Arcade	Success Corporation	Success Corporation	
2013	Kingdom Hearts χ	Web browser	Success Corporation	Square Enix	
2013	Osawari Tantei Nameko Daihanshoku	Nintendo 3DS	BeeWorks	Success Corporation	
2014	Touch Detective Rising 3: Does Funghi Dream of Bananas?	Nintendo 3DS	BeeWorks	Success Corporation	
2019	Umihara Kawase Fresh!	Nintendo Switch, PlayStation 4, Windows	Studio Saizensen	Success Corporation^{JP/Windows}, Nicalis, ININ Games^{NA/PAL}	
2020	Umihara Kawase BaZooka!	Nintendo Switch, PlayStation 4, Windows	Studio Saizensen	Success Corporation^{JP/Windows}, Nicalis, ININ Games^{NA/PAL}	
2021	Tales of Djungarian Hamster	Nintendo Switch	Success Corporation	Success Corporation	
2021	Cotton Rock 'n' Roll: Superlative Night Dreams	Arcade, PlayStation 4, Nintendo Switch, Windows	Studio Saizensen	Sega, Success Corporation^{JP}, Nicalis, ININ Games^{NA/PAL}	
2021	Kasiori	Nintendo Switch	Success Corporation	Success Corporation	
2021	Uchu Shinshuchu	Nintendo Switch	Success Corporation	Success Corporation	
2022	Hakoniwa Bokujou Hitsuji Mura	Nintendo Switch, PlayStation 4, Windows	Success Corporation	Success Corporation	
2022	Touch Detective: Rina and the Funghi Case File	Nintendo Switch	BeeWorks	Success Corporation	
2023	Buccanyar	Nintendo Switch, PlayStation 4, Windows	Studio Saizensen	Success Corporation	
2023	Akai Ito & Akai Shiro HD Remaster	Nintendo Switch, Windows	Success Corporation	Success Corporation	
2024	Heaven Seeker: The Savior of This Cruel World	Windows	Success Corporation	Success Corporation	
2025	Sonic Wings Reunion	Arcade, Nintendo Switch, PlayStation 5, Windows	Success Corporation	Success Corporation	
2025	Ghost Traveler: Adventures in Edo	Nintendo Switch, Windows	Success Corporation	Success Corporation	
2026	Cotton Rock with You: Oriental Night Dreams	Nintendo Switch 2, PlayStation 5, Windows	Studio Saizensen	Success	
2026	Psyvariar 3	Nintendo Switch, Nintendo Switch 2, PlayStation 5, Windows, Xbox Series X/S	Red Art Games, Banana Bytes	Success, Red Art Games	

=== Upcoming works ===
Title	Platform	Developer(s)	Publisher(s)
Izuna (working title)	Nintendo Switch 2, Windows	Success Corporation	Success Corporation
Metal Saga: Hangyaku no Rouka	Nintendo Switch 2	24Frame	Success Corporation

- SuperLite Series
  - SuperLite 1500 Series (Game Boy Advance)
    - Lode Runner (GBA)
    - Asuka 120% Final BURNING Fest.
      - Asuka 120% Return BURNING Fest.
    - ADVANCED V.G.2
    - A-Train IV
  - SuperLite 3in1 Series
  - SuperLite Gold Series
  - SuperLite 2000 Series (PlayStation 2)
    - Ever 17: The Out of Infinity
    - Remember 11: The Age of Infinity
    - Ai Yori Aoshi
    - Monochrome
  - SuperLite 2500 Series (Nintendo DS)
    - Brickdown
    - Crimson Room (DS port of the Flash escape the room game of the same name)
    - Custom Mahjong
    - Gekikara Nanpure 2500 Mon
    - Joshikousei Nigeru! Shinrei Puzzle Gakuen
    - Tokyo Odaiba Casino
    - Chotto-Aima no Colpile DS
    - Quiz no Tabi

== See also ==
- Simple – a series of inexpensive games published by D3, similar to Success's SuperLite series
