= Cotton: Fantastic Night Dreams =

1991 video game

- Japanese arcade flyer
- Developer: Success
- Publishers: Sega: Sega (Arcade); Hudson Soft (TG-16); Turbo Technologies Inc. (TG-16); Electronic Arts Victor (X68000); Success (NGPC); SNK (NGPC); ININ Games (PS4, NS, WIN); Clear River Games (PS5, Switch 2)
- Producer: Takato Yoshinari
- Programmers: Masaru Hatsuyama; Toshiyuki Kuwabara
- Artists: Hideki Tamura; Shinobu Itō; Tatsuo Kashima
- Composer: Kenichi Hirata
- Series: Cotton
- Platforms: Arcade: TurboGrafx-CD; X68000; PlayStation; Neo Geo Pocket Color; Mobile Phone; Nintendo Switch; PlayStation 4; Windows; Nintendo Switch 2; PlayStation 5
- Release: April 1991: Arcade; JP: April 1991 TurboGrafx-CD; JP: 12 February 1993; NA: April 1993 X68000; JP: 24 September 1993 PlayStation; JP: 28 April 1999 Neo Geo Pocket Color; JP: 23 March 2000; EU: 2000 Mobile; JP: 2007 Switch, PlayStation 4; JP: 25 February 2021; WW: 20 July 2021 Windows; WW: 11 November 2021 PS5, Switch 2; WW: October 22, 2026
- Genre: Scrolling shooter
- Modes: Single-player, multiplayer
- Arcade system: Sega System 16

Cotton: Fantastic Night Dreams (Note: Japanese: コットン: FANTASTIC NIGHT DREAMS, Hepburn: Kotton: Fantastic Night Dreams) is a 1991 horizontally scrolling shooter video game developed by Success and published by Sega for arcades. The first installment in the Cotton series, players assume the role of the young witch Cotton who, alongside her fairy companion Silk, sets out on her broomstick on a quest to defeat several monsters and get her Willow candy. Its gameplay mainly consists of shooting mixed with role-playing elements using a main two-button configuration. It ran on the Sega System 16 hardware.

Cotton was later ported to multiple platforms, each one featuring several changes or additions compared with the original version. Cotton proved to be popular among players in Japanese arcades, earning several awards from Gamest magazine; however, the console ports have been met with mixed reception from critics. It is regarded as a key title in the "cute 'em up" sub-genre. On November 28, 2024, the arcade version of the game was ported as part of the Arcade Archives series.

== Gameplay ==
Arcade version

Cotton: Fantastic Night Dreams is a scrolling shooter game reminiscent of Parodius where players assume the role of a young witch named Cotton who, alongside her fairy companion Silk, travels various increasingly difficult levels through a fantasy dream-like world on a quest to defeat several monsters and get her Willow candy.

Players must blast various monsters and avoid being shot while collecting crystal power-ups to enhance Cotton's firepower and unleash powerful magic spells on enemies, in addition of bombs capable of obliterating enemies. The game incorporates some role playing game elements, as players are able to level up their attack up to 13 levels. The player has lives represented by an arrow and three lives, though only one hit is allowed per life and the game is over once all lives are lost, unless more credits are inserted into the arcade machine to continue playing.

== Plot ==
The world of Filament has been enveloped in an evil mist, causing eternal night. This unnatural darkness threatens the land and its inhabitants. A Fairy named Silk asks Cotton to defeat the monsters spreading darkness. Cotton initially refuses until Silk mentions Willow candy, which Cotton will do anything to obtain. This sets Cotton off on her broomstick, blasting through waves of enemies to save the world and acquire her reward

== Development and release ==
Cotton: Fantastic Night Dreams was produced by Success founder Takato Yoshinari. Masaru Hatsuyama and Toshiyuki Kuwabara acted as co-programmers. Hideki Tamura, known for being an anime animator, served as character designer. Tamura was also responsible for the pixel art as co-graphic designer along with artist Shinobu Itō, prior to her role on the unreleased party game QP for Neo Geo, and Tatsuo Kashima. The music was composed by Kenichi Hirata, while Cotton was voiced by radio actress Takae Yoriguchi. Tamura remarked that he quit the anime industry prior to working on the project, being his first job in a video game development position, and as such, was memorable to him in how it taught him how game development worked. Tamura recalled that the game went under the working title Kurumi-zaka Diary: Katsugeki-Hen (Note: くるみ坂日記〜活劇編 (Kurumi-zaka Nikki 〜 Katsugeki-Hen)) early in development, but forced the team to change the name to Cotton and change the story to one that made little sense later on. It made use of hand-drawn animations, which was uncommon for an arcade game at the time. The arcade version supports multiplayer. Cotton: Fantastic Night Dreams was first published by Sega in the arcades for the Sega System 16 arcade board in April 1991, and was showcased to attendees at the 1991 AOU Show after launch.

== Ports and re-releases ==
Cotton was ported to the TurboGrafx-16, first being published in Japan by Hudson Soft on 12 February 1993 and later in North America by Turbo Technologies Inc. in April 1993. This version runs on the Super CD-ROM² expansion featuring a lower screen resolution, a modified color palette, and CD-quality audio. The Japanese version also includes voice acting, with Cotton being voiced by Tarako. The game later received a conversion to the X68000 home computer with many changes and enhancements over the arcade version, published only in Japan by Electronic Arts Victor on 24 September 1993. The title was then ported in near arcade-perfect form to the PlayStation in Japan under the name Cotton Original on 28 April 1999 and later reissued on 30 March 2000 under the "SuperLite 1500" budget series. Cotton Original was later re-released through PlayStation Network on 28 June 2007. It was also ported to the Neo Geo Pocket Color, first being published in Japan by Success on 23 March 2000, and later in Europe by SNK the same year. Due to hardware limitations, the Neo Geo Pocket Color release features less detailed graphics and inferior sound quality compared to previous versions. This version has since become an expensive collector's item. In 2007, the game was released for mobile phones in Japan, with 50 Cotton-themed teacups being given away in a lottery and a competition to commemorate the release. A Mega-CD port was planned but never released.

In 2019, a new version based on the X68000 port titled Cotton Reboot! was announced by Japanese retailer BEEP and scheduled for release on Windows, Nintendo Switch and PlayStation 4. Developed by Rocket-Engine, this version is presented in a 16:9 aspect ratio, adds an extra arrange mode for newcomers and features a faithful recreation of the X68000 version. The arranged mode also features new voice work based on a cast selected by auditioning, with Minami Miyaki now playing the role of Cotton. The PlayStation 4 and Switch versions were made available on February 25, 2021, as both physical and downloadable releases, while the Windows version was released on November 11, 2021, via Steam. Additionally, BEEP re-released the original X68000 port. In 2020, ININ Games announced that Cotton Reboot! would be released in western regions both physically and digitally for Nintendo Switch and PlayStation 4 on July 20, 2021. In December 2020, the original arcade version was re-released as part of the Sega Astro City Mini console. An update to Cotton Reboot! was announced in April 2021, featuring Appli ke Pumpkin and her hat companion Needle from Cotton 2: Magical Night Dreams as free playable characters, as well as improving screen visibility and bug fixes. Both Appli and Neddle are voiced by Hyo-sei and Yoshinori Ishikawa respectively. Hamster Corporation released the arcade version as part of thire Arcade Archives series for the Nintendo Switch and PlayStation 4 on November 28, 2024. Nintendo Switch 2 and PlayStation 5 versions of Cotton Reboot! were released on October 22, 2026.

== Reception ==
Original

Review scores
| Publication | Score |
|---|---|
| Consoles + | (TG-CD) 88% |
| Computer and Video Games | (TG-CD) 90/100 |
| Famitsu | (TG-CD) 29/40 (PS) 21/40 |
| GameFan | (TG-CD) 319/400 |
| GameSpot | (NGPC) 7.1/10 |
| Joypad | (PS) 3/10 |
| Mega Fun | (TG-CD) 71% |
| Video Games (DE) | (TG-CD) 65% (NGPC) 4/5 |
| DuoWorld | (TG-CD) 7/10 |
| Electric Brain | (TG-CD) 83% |
| Gamers' Republic | (PS) D− |
| Gamest | (AC) 39/70 |
| Hippon Super! | (TG-CD) 7/10 |
| Oh!X | (X68K) 9/10 |
| PlayStation Magazine (JP) | (PS) 10/20 |
| Pockett Videogames | (NGPC) 4/5 |

Award
| Publication | Award |
|---|---|
| Gamest Mook (1998) | Grand Prize 5th, Best Shooting Award 4th, Best Performance Award 4th, Best VGM Award 4th, Annual Hit Game 33rd, Best Character '91 2nd (AC) |

Cotton garnered positive reception from seven reviewers of Gamest during its 1991 AOU Show appearance. In Japan, Game Machine listed it as the ninth most popular arcade game of May 1991. In the July 1991 issue of Japanese publication Micom BASIC Magazine, the game was ranked at number sixteen in terms of popularity. Gamest also gave it several awards for the 5th Gamest Grand Prize. Cotton won 4th place in the Best Shooting Award, 4th place in the Best Direction Award, 4th place in the Best VGM Award, and the character of Cotton won 2nd place in Character Awards for best character.

The TurboGrafx-CD port received positive reception from critics. Public reception was also positive: readers of PC Engine Fan voted to give Cotton a 22.82 out of 30 score, ranking at the number 101 spot in a poll, indicating a popular following. French magazine Consoles + praised its arcade-accurate graphics, animations, hard rock soundtrack, playability and replay value but criticized the presentation. Electric Brain compared the game with Parodius while noting its difficulty level, regarding it to be an above average shoot 'em up. They gave positive remarks to the colorful presentation, Valis-like orchestral music and sound effects but criticized the irritating Japanese voicework during story cutscenes. GameFan regarded the port to be one of the better shooter games for the TurboGrafx-CD, commenting positively in regards to its originality, fast action, audiovisual presentation and challenging stages. DuoWorld criticized the TurboGrafx-CD's English translation of cutscenes for being incoherent and Cotton's fairy companion to be less useful than the drones in R-Type and Blazing Lazers. They drew comparisons to Magical Chase in terms of its poor graphics, enemy variety, and sound design. However, they praised the presentation and gameplay. Computer and Video Games commended the visuals, sound and gameplay. In 2008, IGN placed both Cotton and Magical Chase as number 4 on the top ten list of TurboGrafx titles not released on the Virtual Console, stating that both games were different but shared the same general idea.

Japanese magazine Oh!X gave the original X68000 port a positive review. The port also proved popular among the X68000 userbase in Japan, which would eventually led it in being nominated for a "Game of the Year" award from Oh!X but lost against other titles. Cotton Original on PlayStation was met with mixed reception from reviewers. Famitsu was critical of the game, saying that after eight years it was showing its age. Gamers' Republic called the PlayStation port "antiquated", as well as "lifeless" and "insufferably monotonous". They recommended playing games like Radiant Silvergun or R-Type Delta to understand the gap in quality between those games and Cotton. GameFan however, praised the PlayStation version, saying that it is still worth checking out despite the slowdown issue. The Neo Geo Pocket Color conversion was also met with mixed reception. Pockett Videogames commended its use of the handheld's color palette, animations and music but criticized certain aspects such as the sound effects. In 2023, Time Extension identified Cotton as one of the best games for the NGPC.

=== Reboot! ===
Reboot!

Aggregate score
| Aggregator | Score |
|---|---|
| Metacritic | (NS) 81/100 (PS4) 70/100 |

Review scores
| Publication | Score |
|---|---|
| Destructoid | (PS4) 7/10 |
| Famitsu | (NS/PS4) 30/40 |
| Hardcore Gamer | (NS) 4/5 |
| Nintendo Life | (NS) 8/10 |
| Push Square | (PS4) 8/10 |
| TouchArcade | (NS) 4/5 |
| Siliconera | (NS) 8/10 |

Cotton Reboot! received "generally favorable reviews" on Nintendo Switch and "mixed or average reviews" on PlayStation 4, according to review aggregator Metacritic. Famitsu reported that the Switch version of Reboot! sold over 2,894 copies in its first week on the market.

Famitsu's four reviewers praised the game's arranged version for being easy to play, "Jewel Fever" mechanic, flashy visuals, addition of a timed score attack mode and faithful recreation of the X68000 conversion. Nintendo Life's Tom Massey also commended the addition of arranged mode, stating that it plays like a new game, inclusion of the X68000 version and online leaderboards but criticized the amount of visual distraction when playing arranged mode and technical issues when playing the X68000 port. Hardcore Gamer's Jeremy Peeples called it a fantastic reimagining of the original game, giving positive remarks to the remade presentation, immersive environments, ability to switch between the original and arranged soundtracks, and forgiving game design but criticized issues with blind spots. Destructoid's Chris Moyse noted that the core gameplay and scoring mechanic were complex and deep respectively. Moyse gave positive commentary when it came to the colorful and flashy visuals. However, he also criticized this aspect due to being distracting and noted the lack of additional content in the package.

TouchArcade's Shaun Musgrave commented that the number of objects filling the screen could turn the playfield busy at certain times. Nevertheless, Musgrave noted that it was enjoyable following the plot and replay value due to the multiple game modes, difficulty levels and unlockable character. Push Square's Jamie O'Neill praised the game for its two-dimensional graphics, arranged soundtrack, elaborate mechanics and scoring system, inclusion of the X68000 port and accessibility but criticized it for being single-player only, as well as the lack of save states and English voiceovers. Siliconera's Joel Couture commended Reboot! for its impressive HD visual style, remixed soundtrack, mechanically complex gameplay and addition of the X68000 version, claiming each modes brings different playstyles that makes them feel like separate games.

== Legacy ==
Cotton: Fantastic Night Dreams spawned several sequels and follow-ups. Retro Gamer regarded Cotton to be one of the key games in the "cute 'em up" sub-genre alongside Parodius, Fantasy Zone, TwinBee and Harmful Park. In a 2018 interview with 4Gamer.net, designer Yoshiyasu Matsushita stated that Cotton was an influence during the development of Twinkle Star Sprites.
