= Asuka 120% =

Fighting video game series

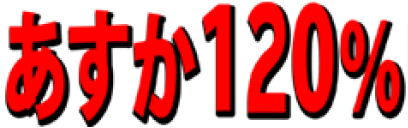
- Series logo
- Genres: Fighting game, bishōjo
- Developers: Fill-in-Cafe; Success (Final and Return)
- Publishers: FamilySoft, NEC Avenue, ASK Kodansha
- Creator: Masatoshi Imaizumi
- Artists: Aoi Nanase, Atsuko Ishida
- Composer: Keishi Yonao
- Platforms: FM Towns, Sharp X68000, PC-Engine, Sega Saturn, PlayStation, Microsoft Windows
- First release: Asuka 120% BURNING Fest.: JP: March 11, 1994
- Latest release: Asuka 120% Return BURNING Fest.: JP: September 24, 1999

Asuka 120% (あすか120%), subtitled Burning Fest., is a Japanese bishōjo fighting video game series from FamilySoft. It is set in a school where members of school clubs fight each other in a fighting tournament. Originally released on the FM Towns home personal computer in 1994, Masatoshi Imaizumi led development with artwork provided by manga artist Aoi Nanase and music by Keishi Yonao. Fill-in-Cafe developed it and its four follow-ups: Excellent (1994) on the same platform, later remade for PlayStation in 1997; Maxima (1995) on PC Engine; Special (1996) on PlayStation; and Limited (1997) on Sega Saturn. Success then developed an additional two titles: Final (1999) on PlayStation and Return (1999) on Windows. New entries in the Asuka 120% series have been announced in the 2020s although are yet to be released.

== Plot ==
The game is set at the Ryōran Private School for Women, which educates the daughters of the upper echelons of society. Every year, the school's clubs hold a martial arts tournament called the "Club Rivalry Budget Contest Mega Fight" to compete for increased budget to the winning school club. After repeated poor performances at previous tournaments, the Chemistry Club president, Tetsuko Ōgigaya, scouts and trains Asuka Honda to become this year's winner. Asuka now has to defeat members of several school clubs in order to succeed.

== Gameplay ==
Asuka vs. Kumi in the original BURNING Fest.

Karina vs. Megumi in Limited BURNING Fest. (Sega Saturn)

The game is a 1v1 fighting game in the vein of Street Fighter II, but in Asuka 120% each character employs a fighting style and techniques unique to each club as opposed to particular martial arts. The game has a standard input system for special moves across the entire cast which had not been seen in other fighting games at the time. Asuka 120% would switch from a 2-button to a 3-button game depending on the console it was released.

Also, unique to Asuka 120% is its "clash system". If both characters hit each other neither take damage; rather, they go into the next phase of the move until one character takes damage. During a clash, players can cancel into a special move, a movement option or a throw, which makes for explosive battles.

The "120%" portion of the game's name comes from the special meter gauge filling up at 120% instead of 100%. Once a full bar of meter is reached, it will begin draining slowly. During this state, characters have unlimited access to super meter.

All these systems, along with expanded mobility options compared to contemporary fighting games of that time, give Asuka 120% a flair of its own.

== Characters ==
The cast of Asuka 120% BURNING Fest. from top left to bottom right: Ryūko, Asuka, Torami, Kumi, Megumi, and Tamaki

Introduced in Asuka 120% BURNING Fest.

- Asuka Honda (本田飛鳥) of the Chemistry Club

Voiced by Riko Sayama
Asuka is a first year student and the titular character of the series. She is best friends with Karina Toyota and more recently, Kumi Ōkubo. Asuka was scouted and trained by the Chemistry Club president, Tetsuko Ougigaya, while still in middle school. Her main attacks involve volatile projectiles such as throwing chemical-filled beakers.

- Kumi Ōkubo (大久保久美) of the Rhythmic Gymnastics Club

Voiced by Miki Nagasawa (original – Limited), Masaki Miki (Final – Return)
Kumi is a first year student who met Asuka during the Ryōran entrance exam and has been friends ever since. Kumi's attacks involve her rhythmic gymnast skills and props.

- Tamaki Shindō (新堂環) of the Tennis Club

Voiced by Juri Shiina (Original – Maxima), Masako Katsuki (Special – Limited), Rieko Ogawa (Final – Return)
Tamaki is a third year student and reigning champion of the tournament. Loved by seniors and juniors alike, she works hard to uphold a good image since she is also the daughter of the school principal. Her moves involve the use of her tennis racket.

- Ryūko Yamazaki (山崎竜子) of the Volleyball Club

Voiced by Akira Morimoto
Ryūko is a second year student. She is popular for her energy in sports, though schoolwork is another matter. Ryūko mainly uses volleyball tactics to attack her opponent, such as tackles and serves.

- Megumi Suzuki (鈴木めぐみ) of the Cheerleading Club

Voiced by Shizuka Hōjō (original – Limited), Yukana Nogami (Final – Return)
Megumi is a second year student who is popular in school but a lousy student. She fights using pom-pons and cheerleading routines.

- Torami Hōjō (北条虎美) of the Karate Club

Voiced by Mio Itō
Torami is a third year student and runner-up from the previous year's tournament. A tomboyish yet popular girl, she returns to the tournament seeking a rematch against Tamaki. Torami fights using powerful karate moves.

Introduced in Asuka 120% Maxima BURNING Fest.

- Karina Toyota (豊田可莉奈) of the Biology Club

Voiced by Kae Araki
Karina is the biology club representative and Asuka's best friend and self-proclaimed rival since childhood. A lot of her special moves involve her pet frog "Kero-pyon".

- Cathy Wild (キャシィ・ワイルド, Kyashii Wairudo) of the Pro-Wrestling Club

Voiced by Judy Monroe (Maxima - Special), Urara Takano (Excellent - Limited), Reika Inoue (Final – Return)
Cathy is a third year exchange student from a sister school in Florida. Cheerful and sociable, she joins the tournament for fun. Her special moves involve pro-wrestling throws.

- Kiyoko Mitarai (御手洗清子) of the Softball Club

Voiced by|Yumiko Fukuda (Maxima), Noriko Hidaka (Special – Return)
Kiyoko is a second year student and the elected future student council president. She is a diligent yet cheerful girl. Her special moves involve a sharply thrown underhand pitch. She has a complex about her own name because her last name, Mitarai (御手洗), is mistaken for otearai (御手洗 orお手洗い), which is a euphemism for toilet in Japan.

- Nana Owada (小和田奈々) of the Japanese Dance Club

Voiced by Miki Takahashi (Maxima - Limited), Yūki Asakura (Final – Return)
Nana is a second year student and the eldest daughter of notable house Owada. She has a stoic and serious personality. Her special moves involve attacking with her folded fan and her naginata.

Introduced in Asuka 120% Special BURNING Fest.

- Shinobu Kawasaki (川崎忍)

Voiced by Hiroka Nishizawa
Shinobu is a second year gang leader from Touyou Harimanada Institute. While traveling on a quest to defeat the strongest opponents from 100 different schools, she ran into Tamaki who was her 100th opponent and the only one to beat her. She enters the tournament seeking a rematch against her.

Introduced in Asuka 120% Limited BURNING Fest.

- Tetsuko Ōgigaya (扇ヶ谷鉄子) of the Chemistry Club

Voiced by Minako Hino (original – Limited), Saeko Shimazu (Final – Return)
Tetsuko is a third year student and the Chemistry Club president. In order to stop losing the club tournament every year, she scouted Asuka while in middle school and subjected her to a year of arduous training. Hence, her special moves resemble Asuka's.

- Genichirō Shindō (新堂源一郎)

Voiced by Seizō Katō (original – Excellent), Daisuke Gōri (Limited), Tohru Sakura (Final – Return)
Genichirō is the school principal and a boss character in the earlier games.

Introduced in Asuka 120% Final BURNING Fest.

- Ichiko Furutachi (古館伊知子) of the Journalism Club

Voiced by Yūko Mizutani (original – Limited), Kaoru Morota (Final – Return)
Ichiko is the journalism club representative who before Final serves as the game's narrator. Her special moves involve attacks with her microphone.

== Development ==
Asuka 120% was produced by just two full-time programmers who comprised the company Fill-in-Cafe. The franchise was programmed and designed by Masatoshi Imaizumi, its music was composed by Keishi Yonao, and the games' illustrations were designed by Aoi Nanase. Asuka 120% Burning Fest was just one fighting game of the era which had female characters, humor, and fan service. Similar games from that era include games such as Tōkidenshō Angel Eyes, Pretty Fighter X, and Variable Geo.

Categorized as a bishōjo game, eleven versions were released for various platforms between 1994 and 1999. The combat system of Asuka 120% was based on the beat-em-up Mad Stalker, and is also similar to Makeruna! Makendō 2: Kimero Youkai Souri. Development of Mad Stalker for the X68000, FM Towns and PlayStation (PCE CD port was co-developed by Kogado Studio); the PlayStation port of Makeruna! Makendō 2: Kimero Youkai Souri (Super Famicom version was developed by Success) was done by Fill-in-Cafe.

In March 2021, a Japanese company called Opera House had announced two new entries in the Asuka 120% series on Twitter. The first was titled Asuka 120% Reborn, which is heavily based on the X68000 games set to release on the Mega Drive with a new character who was said to be a boxer girl, and new content. Additionally, Asuka 120% Reborn is also being planned for an enhanced release on the Nintendo Switch with an exclusive story mode. The second game was titled Asuka 120% O-Nyuu, which will feature the cast as 3D models for the first time and will be released on modern hardware. At EVO Japan 2024, exA-Arcadia announced Asuka 120% EXALLENT.

== Games ==
Game	Details
Asuka 120% BURNING Fest. Original release date: JP: March 11, 1994	Release years by system: 1994 – FM Towns, Sharp X68000
Asuka 120% BURNING Fest. Original release date: JP: March 11, 1994	Notes: The Sharp X68000 release has 3 versions of the original release soundtrack and slightly updated graphics.
Asuka 120% Excellent BURNING Fest. Original release date: JP: December 22, 1994	Release years by system: 1994 – FM Towns; 1997 – PlayStation; 2011 – PlayStation 3 (PlayStation Network)
Asuka 120% Excellent BURNING Fest. Original release date: JP: December 22, 1994	Notes: Story mode in this release was updated from the original using adventure mode elements.; Excellent was later remade for the Sony PlayStation using graphics from Asuka 120% Special BURNING Fest.; The PlayStation version was released on PlayStation 3 as a PS one Classic on February 9, 2011.
Asuka 120% Maxima BURNING Fest. Original release date: JP: July 28, 1995	Release years by system: 1995 – PC Engine Super CD-ROM²
Asuka 120% Maxima BURNING Fest. Original release date: JP: July 28, 1995	Notes: Maxima added 4 new characters to the roster, bringing the total to 10 playable characters.; Controls were simplified due to the NEC PC-Engine having a limited number of buttons.
Asuka 120% Special BURNING Fest. Original release date: JP: March 29, 1996	Release years by system: 1996 – PlayStation; 2010 – PlayStation 3 (PlayStation Network)
Asuka 120% Special BURNING Fest. Original release date: JP: March 29, 1996	Notes: This version adds a new hidden character bringing the total roster to 11.; A reprint nicknamed Special Version 2 featured rebalancing and slight graphical adjustments. It can be identified by a black dot on the bottom right corner of the game's cover.; Special Version 2 was released on PlayStation 3 as a PS one Classic on December 8, 2010.
Asuka 120% Limited BURNING Fest. Original release date: JP: October 9, 1997	Release years by system: 1997 – Sega Saturn
Asuka 120% Limited BURNING Fest. Original release date: JP: October 9, 1997	Notes: This version adds 2 new hidden characters bringing the total roster to 13.; For this release, graphics were heavily altered to larger sprites and new artworks.; A Kaneko Super Nova-based arcade version was planned, but got canceled, likely due to Fill-in-Cafe's bankruptcy in 1998.; An unofficial updated version titled Asuka 120% LimitOver BURNING Fest was released by former Fill-in-Cafe employees in September 1998.; Story mode has been removed, replaced by an all-new 'Death Match Mode'. and extensive additions have been made to the gameplay. Changes include new moves, new techniques, and balance changes.; LimitOver was fan translated to English in 2015.
Asuka 120% Final BURNING Fest. Original release date: JP: May 27, 1999	Release years by system: 1999 – PlayStation; 2011 – PlayStation 3 (PlayStation Network)
Asuka 120% Final BURNING Fest. Original release date: JP: May 27, 1999	Notes: Developed by Success Corporation.; This version adds a new hidden character bringing the total roster to 14.; Reiussed in September 2002 as part of the SuperLite 1500 budget series.; It was released on PlayStation 3 as a PS one Classic on April 13, 2011.
Asuka 120% Return BURNING Fest. Original release date: JP: September 24, 1999	Release years by system: 1999 – Microsoft Windows
Asuka 120% Return BURNING Fest. Original release date: JP: September 24, 1999	Notes: Developed by Success Corporation.
Asuka 120% BURNING Fest. EXALLENT Original release date: JP: TBA	Release years by system: TBD 2024 – Arcade
Asuka 120% BURNING Fest. EXALLENT Original release date: JP: TBA	Notes: Developed by exA-Arcadia.

== Reception ==
Famitsu review scores
Game	Famitsu
Asuka 120% Maxima BURNING Fest.	21/40 (PCE-SCD)
Asuka 120% Special BURNING Fest.	23/40 (PS1)
Asuka 120% Final BURNING Fest.	28/40 (PS1)

Japanese game magazine Famitsu reviewed several versions of the game. Maxima Burning Fest was given a score of 21 out of 40, Special Burning Fest was given a score of 23 out of 40, and Burning Fest Final was given a score of 28 out of 40.

Ted Thomas from Viz Media's online magazine wrote that Special BURNING Fest. is not worth importing.

GameSpot reviewed Excellent BURNING Fest. and gave it 7.1 in its review.

The game has been featured at fighting game tournaments, such as EVO Japan 2020. Additional to the games, Asuka 120% has had novels, soundtrack CDs, and other merchandise released during the 90s.

== See also ==
- Phantom Breaker
