= Fill-in-Cafe =

Japanese video game developer (1987–1998)

- The second and last logo
- Industry: Video games
- Founded: 1987 (as Team Cross Wonder)
- Defunct: 1998
- Fate: Defunct
- Headquarters: Japan
- Area served: Japan
- Key people: Masatoshi Imaizumi; Kanta Watanabe; Masaki Ukyo; Keishi Yonao
- Products: Asuka 120% Mad Stalker: Full Metal Forth

Fill-in-Cafe (フィルインカフェ) was a video game developer that was founded in Japan in 1987. They are best known for creating the Asuka 120% series.

== History ==
In 1987, Fill-in-Cafe was founded as Team Cross Wonder, and later renamed itself as "Fill-in-Cafe" in 1989 and incorporated in 1991. They first developed Metal Sight for the X68000 under the Team Cross Wonder label, followed by developing Neural Gear under the Fill-in-Cafe label. Later, they hired several more companies like Intec and Family Soft to publish their products. In 1994, they became successful with the release of the Asuka 120% BURNING Fest. franchise, as well as with Mad Stalker: Full Metal Forth and its multiple versions.

In 1998, Fill-in-Cafe filed for bankruptcy. Some planned titles were canceled, such as a sequel to Panzer Bandit and an untitled, enhanced arcade port of the Asuka 120% BURNING Fest. Limited with Kaneko being the arcade publisher. Shortly afterward, Success Corporation took charge of developing Asuka 120% BURNING Fest. Final and Asuka 120% BURNING Fest. Return after their relationship with Fill-in-Cafe and Datam Polystar in developing and publishing titles together, such as Makeruna! Makendō 2: Kimero Youkai Souri for instance.

After bankruptcy, Family Soft bought the rights to most of its developed library, including its only self-published title Community POM. Kanta Watanabe and Masaki Ukyo moved to Treasure while Masatoshi Imaizumi moved to establish R.U.N (Release Universe Network). Masaki Ukyo later joined R.U.N with Imaizumi.

== Developed games ==
=== 3DO ===
- Sotsugyou II: Neo Generation Special (Shar Rock)
- Tanjou: Debut Pure (Shar Rock)

=== Arcade ===
- Jan Jan Paradise (Electro Design)
- Taisen Idol Mahjong Final Romance 2 (Video System)

=== X68000 ===
- Mission: Metal Sight (System Sacom)
- Neural Gear (Crossmedia Soft)
- Pitapat (Crossmedia Soft)
- Mad Stalker: Full Metal Forth (Family Soft)
- Asuka 120% BURNING Fest (Family Soft)

=== FM Towns ===
- Mad Stalker: Full Metal Force (Family Soft)
- Asuka 120% Excellent BURNING Fest (Family Soft)

=== PlayStation ===
- Asuka 120% Excellent BURNING Fest (Family Soft)
- Asuka 120% Special BURNING Fest Special (Family Soft)
- Community POM (Fill in Cafe)
- Elfin Paradise (ASK Kodansha)
- Hatsukoi Valentine (Family Soft)
- Mad Stalker: Full Metal Force (Family Soft)
- Makeruna! Makendō 2: Kimero Youkai Souri (Datam Polystar)
- Metamor Panic: Doki Doki Youma Busters (Family Soft)
- Night Striker (Ving)
- PAL: Shinken Densetsu (Tohoku Shinsha)
- Panzer Bandit (Banpresto)
- Photo Genic (Sunsoft)
- Voice Paradise Excella (ASK Kodansha)

=== PC Engine CD-ROM² ===
- Asuka 120% Maxima: BURNING Fest (Family Soft)
- Championship Rally (Intec)
- Gain Ground SX (graphics cooperation) (NEC Avenue)
- Galaxy Deka Gayvan (Intec)
- Kakutou Haou Densetsu Algunos (Intec)
- Mad Stalker: Full Metal Force (co-developed by Kogado Studio) (NEC Home Electronics)
- Ruin: Kami no Isan (Victor)

=== PC-98 ===
- Crasher Joe: Kanraku Wakusei no Inbou (Family Soft)
- Kidou Senshi Gundam MS Field 2 '92 (Family Soft)
- Kidou Senshi Gundam MS Field 2 '93 (Family Soft)
- Photo Genic (Sunsoft)
- Yamashina Keisuke no Sengoku (Takeru)

=== PC-FX ===
- Makeruna! Makendou Z (NEC Home Electronics)
- Ojousama Sousamou (NEC Home Electronics)
- Voice Paradise (NEC Home Electronics)

=== Saturn ===
- Asuka 120% Limited BURNING Fest (ASK Kodansha)
- Night Striker S (Ving)
- Asuka 120% LimitOver BURNING Fest (Unofficial)

=== Super NES ===
- Kiteretsu Daihyakka: Chōjikū Sugoroku (Video System)

=== Windows ===
- Metamor Panic: Doki Doki Youma Busters (Family Soft)
