= Vanguard Princess =

2009 video game

- Developers: Tomoaki Sugeno exA-Arcadia (R)
- Engine: Fighter Maker 2nd
- Platforms: Microsoft Windows, Linux, Cloud (OnLive), Arcade
- Release: Microsoft Windows; June 26, 2009; Cloud (OnLive); April 10, 2013; Arcade; TBA
- Genre: Fighting
- Modes: Single-player, multiplayer

Vanguard Princess (ヴァンガードプリンセス, Vangaado Purinsesu), also known as Vanguard Princess: Senjin no Himegimi (ヴァンガードプリンセス 先陣の姫君) is a Japanese dōjin 2D fighting game for Windows and Linux. Developed by a single programmer and illustrator, Tomoaki Sugeno (nicknamed Suge9), the game was created using Fighter Maker 2nd and was released for PC on June 26, 2009, and April 10, 2013, for OnLive.

== Gameplay ==
Vanguard Princess is a 2D fighting game featuring an all-female cast. The player selects both a fighter and a support character, who follows the fighter and can assist her.

== Plot ==
A mysterious woman with supernatural powers (Hilda Rize) is captured by the government. Her powers are accidentally unleashed, bestowing various young women with magical powers.

== Development and release ==
Vanguard Princess was fully developed by Tomoaki Sugeno (or Suge9), an ex-Capcom sprite designer who worked in games like Resident Evil 3: Nemesis and made character sprites for The King of Fighters EX: Neo Blood. Sugeno uses Fighter Maker 2nd for his work, a popular graphic engine for Windows by ASCII. Sugeno designed and illustrated the game by himself, but the music was taken from "nash music library", a royalty-free library of songs. Sugeno also used voice actors to record the voices for all the characters. Sugeno planned a future update called Vanguard Princess Prime which would introduce a new character named Rikako but has since ceased development on it.

An English version was released by eigoMANGA in February 2013 on Amazon.com to North America and Europe. The following month, they released a cloud version of the game on the Onlive game service. A notable difference in the English version is that the game edits the explicit content in the original Japanese version. The English version also unlocks Hilda as a playable support character. A downloadable PC version of the game was released via Steam on March 3, 2014, after being Greenlit by the community. This version comes with the original English release, plus a free, optional Director's Cut add-on, which returns previously removed content to the game.

At Evo Japan 2024, exA-Arcadia announced an updated arcade version called Vanguard Princess R.

== Reception ==
After the official release, Vanguard Princess was initially picked up on by video game websites such as Daiken, Kotaku and Siliconera, and later by Famitsu and IT+Media.

== See also ==
- List of fighting games
