= Panzer Bandit =

1997 video game

- Developer: Fill-in-Cafe
- Publisher: Banpresto
- Producers: Masaya Konya; Akira Kanatani
- Designers: Shōji Yamanaka; Masatoshi Imaizumi; Yoshitsune Izuna
- Composer: Kenta Watanabe
- Platform: PlayStation
- Release: JP: August 7, 1997
- Genre: Beat 'em up
- Modes: Single-player, multiplayer

Panzer Bandit (Note: Japanese: パンツァーバンディット, Hepburn: Pantsā Banditto) is a video game developed by Fill-in-Cafe and published by Banpresto for the PlayStation in 1997 and for PlayStation Network in 2011, exclusively in Japan.

== Gameplay ==
Gameplay screenshot

Panzer Bandit is a side-scrolling beat 'em up game that uses the same engine used in Mad Stalker: Full Metal Forth, also for the PlayStation. There is a total of 12 characters, including the four story characters and the eight unlockable bosses. The game is controlled with two attack buttons (strong and weak) and the directional pad for moving left, right, crouching, and jumping. Shoulder buttons can also be used to change between foreground and background and can be used to activate the character's special attack. An unusual aspect of the game is that if the player stands still during an attack, it is considered a guard. Other features include a combo counter and a guided elemental attack which launches an enemy.

== Plot ==
In the world of Panzer Bandit, sources have since gone scarce with the reduction in energy that is consistently used by humans. For this, an organization called Arc, led by the evil Prof. Fuarado, seek to manipulate the consumption of preserved energy and ultimately conquer the world with that in possession. For the course of the game, four heroes are required to take the preserved energy before Arc and ultimately, destroy whatever is left of Arc.

== Development ==
Panzer Bandit is based on Axion, an unreleased fighting game for the Mega Drive under development by Treasure before being reworked into Yu Yu Hakusho Makyō Tōitsusen. The music was composed by Kenta Watanabe.

== Reception ==
Reception

Review scores
Publication	Score
Consoles +	87%
Famitsu	26/40
GameFan	41/50
Ação Games	7,5/10
Dengeki PlayStation	90/100, 60/100

Initial reviews for Panzer Bandit were positive. Consoles + favorably compared its gameplay to Capcom's Final Fight games, enjoying its action-filled gameplay and sense of humor. Though they felt the stages were too short and its multiplayer mode became unnecessarily chaotic, they felt these issues were surpassed by the game's overall quality. These sentiments were mirrored by Superjuegos, which also enjoyed the variety of its characters. The magazine also praised the game for sticking out from Banpresto's other titles, such as its anime licenses and Super Robot Wars series. Multiple critics pointed out similarities between Panzer Bandit and Treasure's Guardian Heroes (1996); GameFan believed Banpresto's offering was different enough to make it stand out, and showed enthusiasm towards its combat and enemy juggling mechanics.

Retrospective reception for Panzer Bandit has also been positive. In 2014, Push Square described it as being a "stunning" game, saying that the game was an example of demonstration of graphical two-dimensional capabilities for the original PlayStation. They felt the game wasn't as well-designed as Guardian Heroes, but its controls and combat sequences made it an enjoyable game in its own right. Hardcore Gaming 101 in 2019 wrote that Panzer Bandit was a far better follow-up to Guardian Heroes than the official sequel, Guardian Heroes 2 (2004), for Game Boy Advance. The site liked its RPG-inspired mechanics and gameplay, though they claimed its repetitiveness and lack of additional content prevented it from being as polished as Treasure's game. Retro Gamer said Panzer Bandit made for "the spitting image" of Guardian Heroes, and worth the time of its players.
