= Phantom Breaker: Battle Grounds =

2013 video game

- Japanese limited edition box art
- Developer: 5pb. Games (Note: Phantom Breaker: Battle Grounds Ultimate developed by Rocket Panda Games)
- Publishers: Mages; Degica (Windows); Rocket Panda Games (Ultimate)
- Designer: Masatoshi Imaizumi
- Writer: Masaki Sakari
- Composer: Takeshi Abo
- Series: Phantom Breaker
- Engine: Unreal Engine 5 (Ultimate)
- Platforms: Xbox 360; PlayStation Vita; Microsoft Windows; PlayStation 4; Nintendo Switch; PlayStation 5; Xbox One; Xbox Series X/S
- Release: Xbox 360: WW: February 27, 2013; PlayStation Vita: JP: March 13, 2014; NA: August 12, 2014; EU: July 30, 2014; Windows: WW: January 23, 2015; Overdrive; PlayStation 4: WW: July 21, 2015; Nintendo Switch: WW: December 7, 2017; Ultimate; Windows, Switch, PS4, PS5, Xbox One, Series X/S: WW: Q1 2025
- Genre: Beat 'em up
- Modes: Single-Player, multiplayer

Phantom Breaker: Battle Grounds (ファントムブレイカー：バトルグラウンド, Fantomu Bureikā: Batoru Guraundo) is a beat 'em up developed and published by Mages under the 5pb. brand, and originally released on February 27, 2013 for the Xbox 360. It is a spin-off of the fighting game Phantom Breaker.

On March 12, 2013, a downloadable content add-on, the "Kurisu Pack," was released which adds Makise Kurisu from the Steins;Gate franchise as a playable character and raises the maximum character level. On November 18, 2016 two additional DLC packs were released, the "Frau Pack" adds Frau Kōjiro from the Robotics;Notes franchise as a playable character, while the "BGM Pack" adds programmable sound generator and frequency modulation versions of the background music. The game was featured in the official music video of "Move" by I Fight Dragons.

In September 2023, Rocket Panda Games announced a complete remaster of the game using Unreal Engine 5, titled Phantom Breaker: Battle Grounds Ultimate. It is scheduled for a 2025 release on Nintendo Switch, PlayStation 4, PlayStation 5, Windows, Xbox One, and Xbox Series X/S.

== Plot ==
In Phantom Breaker: Battle Grounds players play as chibi versions of Mikoto, Waka, Itsuki and Yuzuha as they fight against large groups of enemies. Their friend, Nagi, has been captured by Phantom and the girls must go through hordes of Phantom's minions to try and rescue her, with each one having unique encounters and dialogue with the enemies.

== Development and release ==
Phantom Breaker: Battle Grounds was developed by Mages.

A PlayStation Vita version was released on March 13, 2014 in Japan. The game was released in Europe on July 30, 2014 and North America on August 12, 2014. It is the first Vita game released worldwide by 5pb., and, according to producer Masaki Sakari, involved a number of hurdles relating to regional certification. A Windows port was later announced, which would be published by Degica and was released on January 23, 2015. An enhanced port for the PlayStation 4, entitled Phantom Breaker: Battle Grounds Overdrive had also been announced and was released on July 21, 2015. A Nintendo Switch port of Overdrive was released on December 7, 2017, adding in additional content not found in previous versions, but lacking the online functionality of the original.

== Reception ==
Reception

Aggregate score
Aggregator	Score
Metacritic	(X360) 72/100 (VITA) 67/100 (PC) 64/100 (PS4) 72/100 (NS) 69/100

Review scores
Publication	Score
Destructoid	8.0/10
Electronic Gaming Monthly	8.0/10
Game Informer	8.0/10
IGN	5.0/10
