= Pixel Game Maker MV =

Visual editor based game engine

- Original author(s): Kadokawa Corporation
- Developer(s): Kadokawa Corporation, Gotcha Gotcha Games Inc., exA-Arcadia (Arcade)
- Initial release: 2019
- Written in: JavaScript
- Website: tkool.jp

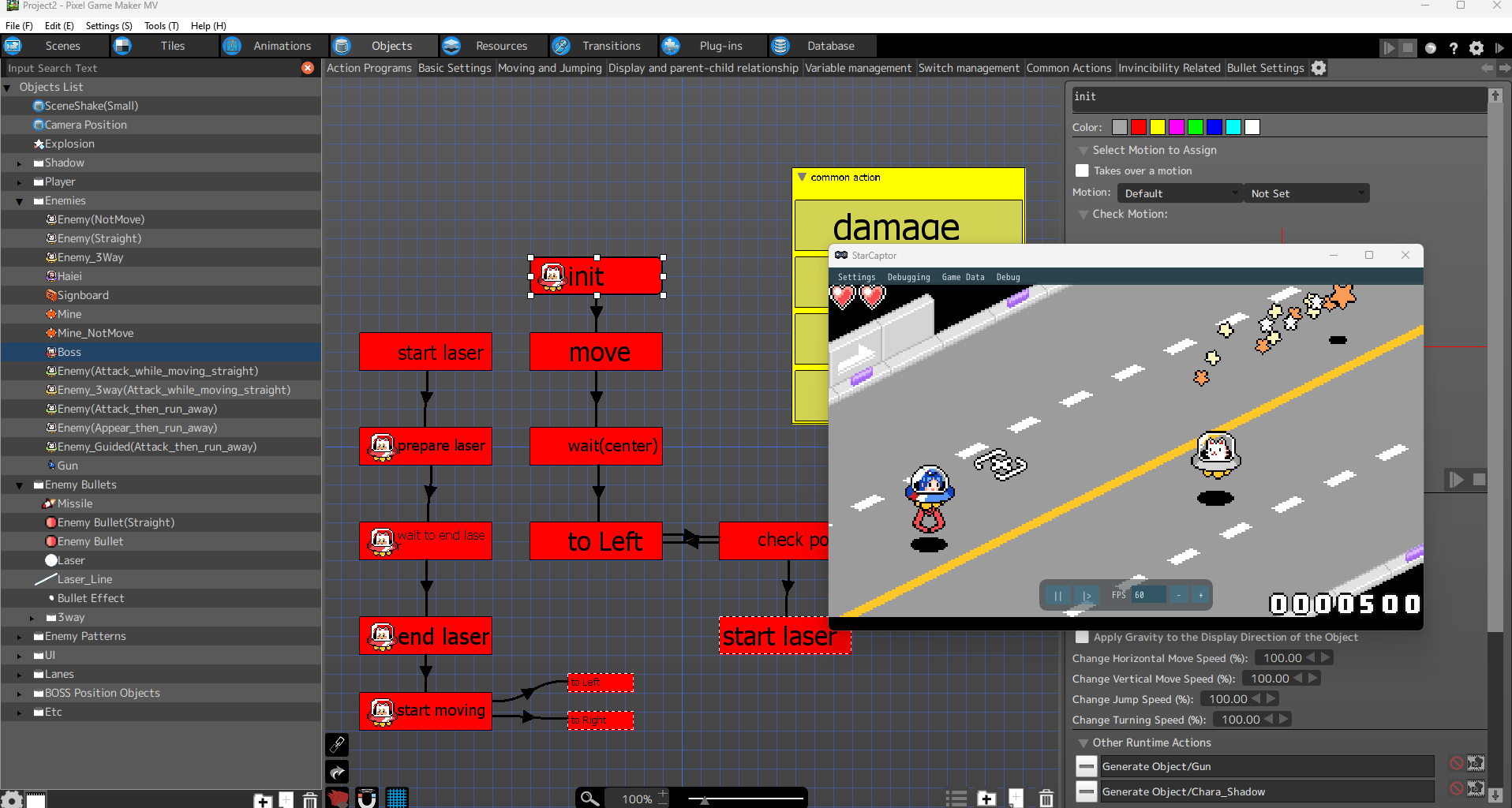
Visual Scripting GUI and playtesting in Pixel Game Maker MV

Pixel Game Maker MV (released as "Action Game Tsukuru" (アクションゲームツクール) in Japan) is a 2D action game production software published by Playism. It allows for the creation of 2D games without the need for programming.

The software is abbreviated to "Actsuku" amongst the Japanese community and to PGMMV in English. PGMMV was released by Gotcha Gotcha Games, a subsidiary of KADOKAWA, as a beta version in 2018. It was fully released in 2019. exA-Arcadia licensed Pixel Game Maker MV for arcades in 2020.

== Development ==
The development of Pixel Game Maker MV was directed by Takuya Hatakeyama for Kadokawa Corporation in Tokyo. The development team included people who had worked on console games for the Game Boy Advance and Nintendo 3DS. The software was intended to facilitate indie game development without the need for programming. Pixel Game Maker MV was developed with indie developers in mind, and its features were gradually introduced through making reference to traditional 2D action games. During development the team attempted to recreate classic action games such as Super Mario Bros. and Mega Man to ascertain that most of the important features required to develop such games were included.

Takuya Hatakeyama reports that during development some issues, such as the software being resource heavy or object clipping, had to be severely troubleshooted. These issues were fixed as much as possible but he stated that they may still occur to some degree. To circumvent such issues, Pixel Game Maker MV was incorporated with various tweaking functions for several parameters so that such issues may be addressed by the users during their process of developing a game.

The software was shipped with the inclusion of a series of quality-of-life functionalities, such as tutorials and the “execute object action” function which not only allows users to initiate the action of an object by bypassing other links and conditionals, but also allows them to apply the action of one object to another so they can use the same action for multiple objects. Other parameters, such as gravity and frame-by-frame animation adjustments, can be incorporated to specific designs. The early access version of PGMMV was newly released by Kadokawa Corporation as a beta version on July 24, 2018. It was released on Steam on 19 September 2019.

== Cross-platform support ==
Pixel Game Maker MV at time of release could only produce games for Windows OS. However, since version 1.0.3 the engine could export games suitable for the Nintendo Switch. Developers are required to enter into a partnership with Kadokawa Corporation to release games on the Nintendo platform, which supports resolutions of 1280:720. The same approach has been used by the company in connection with games selected as winners of their so-called "Pixel Game Maker MV Game Development Challenge," that are periodic competitions in which the winning contestants would be required to sign a publishing agreement that allows Kadokawa to publish the game on their behalf and produce derivative work. In those challenges, resolutions of 640:360 were also supported provided that the display size was doubled. Since 2021, games can be designed for the arcade using exA-Arcadia's custom version which supports arcade features like 1 frame input lag, coins & credits and arcade controls. Developers are required to enter into a contract with exA-Arcadia to release games on the arcade platform.

== Scripting ==
Pixel Game Maker MV uses a proprietary scripting language called "ActionScript" (no relation to Adobe's ActionScript language) for programming game logic and behavior. This language is specific to the engine and is designed to be easy to use for beginners while also offering more advanced capabilities for experienced developers. The language is based on visual programming using event-driven logic, allowing users to create game elements and behaviors without the need for traditional coding. Additionally, Pixel Game Maker MV supports the use of external plugins and libraries, which can be written in a variety of programming languages such as C++ or JavaScript.

== Reception ==
Pixel Game Maker MV is reputed to have sold more than 2,000,000 copies worldwide. During the time of its release the software has been considered as a success within the independent developer community but has been criticized for being a relatively new and undocumented product, and lacking features such as drag-and-drop functionality. Other reviews of Pixel Game Maker MV state that despite its potential, the engine is overshadowed by competitors such as Unreal Engine and Unity, as these have been constantly improved for various decades whilst Pixel Game Maker MV is comparatively younger. In 2020, it was praised by IGN for allowing developers to apply for worldwide publishing of games developed through PGMMV on the Nintendo eShop. The periodic game development contests organized by the team behind PGMMV and called the Pixel Game Maker MV Game Development Challenge have generally been well received. Other reviews indicated that Pixel Game Maker MV is a flexible program with a decent resource library and a relatively easy user interface.
