= Fighter Maker =

- Genres: Fighting game, game development
- Developers: OUTBACK; Kuusou Kagaku exA-Arcadia (Arcade)
- Publishers: ASCII (2DFM95); Enterbrain (2DFM2); Agetec (FM) exA-Arcadia (Arcade)
- Platforms: exA-Arcadia (Arcade), PlayStation, PlayStation 2, Microsoft Windows
- First release: 2D Fighter Maker 95; 1998
- Latest release: Fighter Maker 2; 2002

Fighter Maker (格闘ツクール; Kakutō Tsukūru) is a series of games for PlayStation consoles and Microsoft Windows. It features a robust character creation system, letting players even create animations. There are two versions of the games, Fighter Maker (FM series) and 2D Fighter Maker (2DFM series).

== Games ==
=== 3D series ===
==== Fighter Maker ====
Fighter Maker
- Developer: ASCII Entertainment
- Publishers: JP: ASCII Entertainment; WW: Agetec
- Platform: PlayStation
- Release: JP: 30 July 1998; NA: 17 June 1999; EU: 2000
- Genre: Fighting
- Modes: Single-player, multiplayer

Part of Agetec's Designer Series, Fighter Maker is 3D-based and allows users to create custom moves for their fighters.

The music for the game was composed by the U.K. band INTELLIGENTSIA, who also created the in-game FX; MIRAI, one of the band's two members, is a playable character in the game.

The first FM game is also known for having one licensed character, Street Fighter EX's Skullomania, complete with the original move list.

===== Reception =====
Fighter Maker

Aggregate score
Aggregator	Score
GameRankings	69%

Review scores
Publication	Score
AllGame	4/5
Electronic Gaming Monthly	8/10, 9/10, 8.5/10, 8/10
Famitsu	25/40
Game Informer	8/10
GameRevolution	C+
GameSpot	6.4/10
IGN	8/10
PlayStation Official Magazine – UK	3/10
Official U.S. PlayStation Magazine	3.5/5
PlayStation: The Official Magazine	3/5

The game received average reviews according to the review aggregation website GameRankings. IGN commended the game's controls as "tight" and "solid", as well its character creation system, and called Fighter Maker "one of the most unique software packages" for the PlayStation. GameRevolution gave it a mixed review, a few weeks before the game was released Stateside. In Japan, Famitsu gave it a score of 25 out of 40.

==== Fighter Maker 2 ====
Fighter Maker 2
- Developer: Enterbrain
- Publishers: JP: Enterbrain; NA: Agetec
- Platform: PlayStation 2
- Release: JP: 29 August 2002; NA: 19 November 2002
- Genre: Fighting
- Modes: Single-player, multiplayer

Fighter Maker 2 (FM2) for the PS2 was another entry in the Designer Series from Agetec Inc. It is similar to the original, but with more advancements in character design, movement, and attacks.

===== Reception =====
Fighter Maker 2

Aggregate score
Aggregator	Score
Metacritic	58/100

Review scores
Publication	Score
Game Informer	6.5/10
GamePro	4/5
GameRevolution	D−
GameSpot	4.6/10
GameSpy	2/5
IGN	7.5/10
Official U.S. PlayStation Magazine	1.5/5
PlayStation: The Official Magazine	7/10

Fighter Maker 2 received more mixed reviews than the original according to the review aggregation website Metacritic.

=== 2D series ===
==== 2D Fighter Maker 95 ====
2D Fighter Maker 95 (FM95) was released for Windows prior to ASCII's departure from gaming. Unlike its PlayStation counterparts, this version focused on 2D-style gameplay, allowing the user to create and import their own characters, sounds and graphics into the engine, allowing for far more flexibility and range than the PS versions. The program was pirated and fan translated to English and released on the Internet, where it found a large following amongst dojin game makers and the M.U.G.E.N. community.

==== 2D Fighter Maker 2nd ====
2D Fighter Maker 2nd (FM2K or 2DK) was released by ASCII's successor company, Enterbrain. An update to the original version, FM2K allowed for a greater amount of expansion and extension than FM95, revising much of the original engine to allow more options while adding a menu-based system for clarity. As with the previous version, it became wildly popular amongst the dojin communities in Japan. Again, piracy and a fan translation followed, though the second version has yet to meet with the success of the first, primarily due to the large amount of M.U.G.E.N. communities already in operation as well as the incomplete translation of the FM2K software and documentation.

==== 2D Fighter Maker 2nd EXA ====
In 2019, Kadokawa exclusively licensed the 2D Fighter Maker 2nd engine to exA-Arcadia. In order to use it for arcades, exA-Arcadia re-developed the engine from scratch to use hardware rendering instead of the software rendering of the original version. New features that were not possible before have been added: handling of coins and credits, multiple language support, transitioning between single player and VS games, CPU vs CPU demos, 16:9 widescreen, full screen display and 0.3 frames input latency. This version of the tool is only available for exA-Arcadia developers.

== See also ==
- Enterbrain's other game creation suites:
  - RPG Maker
  - Sim RPG Maker
- Beats of Rage
- M.U.G.E.N
