= Tattoo Assassins =

Unreleased video game

- Tattoo Assassins arcade flyer
- Developer: Data East Pinball
- Publisher: Data East
- Director: Bob Gale
- Producer: Mike Marvin
- Designers: Joe Kaminkow; Eddi Wilde (stunt coordinator); John Carpenter (programmer)
- Artists: Paul Faris; Bob Short (make-up artist)
- Writer: Bob Gale
- Composer: Brian L. Schmidt
- Platform: Arcade
- Release: Cancelled
- Genre: Fighting
- Modes: Single-player, multiplayer
- Arcade system: Data East DECO32

Tattoo Assassins is an unreleased fighting game developed by Data East Pinball (currently known as Stern Pinball), the pinball division of Data East for release in arcades. A few prototypes were test-marketed in 1994, but the game was never officially released. Spearheaded by Bob Gale and Joe Kaminkow, Tattoo Assassins was designed to be Data East's answer to Mortal Kombat.

The game's development had a nine-month deadline, nearly coinciding with Sega's purchase of Data East's pinball division, which would not be met. It was nearly completed before being cancelled, though it still had gameplay and sound glitches.

In 2025, exA-Arcadia announced plans to revive Tattoo Assassins with bug fixes and up to 4k resolution for its namesake platform under a deal with Data East's current rights holder G-Mode.

== Story and gameplay ==
Mullah Abah, spiritual leader of a group known as the "Order of Colors", discovers a secret known as "Ink of Ghize", a tattoo ink-like fluid that can transform into other objects when applied to humans. Koldan, one of the Order of Colors, decides to use it for himself, and takes over nine people who have applied tattoos. Mullah, with the help of a woman known as Lyla Blue, has the player possess one of the nine fighters to go against Koldan.

The gameplay has been described as "standard", with similarities to Mortal Kombat being noted. Fights take the form of best-of-three matches, and fighters have generic attacks such as punches and kicks, and "special moves" performed by joystick inputs along with button inputs.

The game was advertised as having 2,196 different fatalities, though only around 200 were noted, with some sources only noting around 60. Among those were "Nudalities", based on rumors of their presence in Mortal Kombat II, where the opposing fighter loses their clothes. Other fatalities included flaming farts, giant flyswatters, cruise ships, and references to other Data East games (such as BurgerTime).

== Development ==
Gameplay screenshot, featuring Prizm (left) fighting against A. C. Current (right)

The game was developed by Data East Pinball. The game was conceived by Bob Gale, co-screenwriter for Back to the Future. The game originated from a movie script Gale had written. Its development began with promises of a US$25,000 bonus, among other benefits, if the game could be finished on time, but with a deadline of nine months. In late 1994, when time and development funds were running out, Sega bought Data East Pinball, including Tattoo Assassins, and eventually had the game cancelled and most of its arcade machines destroyed, in favor of solely focusing on pinball production.

It was beta tested in some arcades before being cancelled. In 2001, GamePro noted that two arcade machines contained the final version of the game, with one confirmed to be owned by a private seller. One other machine was up for sale on eBay. The presence of one of those machines led to the game's ROM being dumped years later. In May 2025, exA-Arcadia announced it was working with the rights holders to bring the project back to life using the game's original source code, including bug fixes and new content.

== Reception ==
The game received overall negative reception. Next Generation panned the game for poor synchronization between controls and characters, "slow and choppy" animation, and an "extraordinary lack of any real innovation" compared to Mortal Kombat II. Felipe Rojas of La Tercera criticized the stages as flat, the music as repetitive, the gameplay as crude, the animations as poorly digitized, and the characters as derivative and lacking in identity, commenting that the game felt unfinished. However, he praised the game for its variety in fatalities and generally bizarre nature. Robert "Bobinator" Naytor for Hardcore Gaming 101 opined that Tattoo Assassins might have been the worst Data East game ever if it was released. Allistair Pinsof at Destructoid ranked it as the worst Mortal Kombat clone ever made. Co-creator of Mortal Kombat John Tobias called it the worst fighting game ever made. Gavin Jasper from Den of Geek compared it to Plan 9 from Outer Space, stating that "There are worse games out there, but this one gets the attention because it's too weird to exist... and it kind of doesn't." He commented on the game's sense of humor, including Koldan faking out his presence in every fight, including his own, and its unintentional jokes resulting from glitches, such as one fatality creating multiple giant bouncing cooked turkeys.
