= Cacoma Knight in Bizyland =

1992 video game

- North American box art by Greg Martin
- Developer: Affect
- Publishers: JP: Datam Polystar; NA: SETA Corporation
- Composer: Takahiro Wakuta
- Platform: Super NES
- Release: JP: November 21, 1992; NA: 1993
- Genre: Puzzle
- Modes: Single player Multiplayer

Cacoma Knight in Bizyland, known in Japan as Cacoma Knight (カコマ☆ナイト, Kakoma Naito) is a Super NES video game created by Datam Polystar. Seta USA created the English version of the game. The Japanese version is copyrighted in 1992, and the English version is copyrighted in 1993. The title is a pun on kakomanai to (囲まないと), meaning "must surround".

== Gameplay ==
Gameplay

Cacoma Knight is a hybrid of Qix and anime elements. Each level is a single screen. The first image that the player sees is a landscape, for example, a forest or a town. The image will then fade into a "corrupt" version of the landscape, for example, the trees become rotten and buildings become ruined. Each screen has a "Qualify" target that shows how much of the screen must be cleared before the game continues to the next level. The player can then use the Magical Chalk to section off an area of the landscape, using either the borders of existing cleared sections or the borders of the screen. When a full shape is completed with no holes in its borders, the smaller of the two sections created is "purified" and returned to the original state shown at the beginning of the level. In the cleared section, there may be power-ups or items that increase the point score of the player. Therefore, a greater "% Cleared" score means more points and power-ups will be rewarded, so it is beneficial to the player to attempt to clear as much of the screen as possible before exceeding the Qualify target.

The player may control one of three characters, Jack (Hii (ヒー) in the Japanese version), Jean (Jin (ジン)), or RB93 (Cacomaru (カコマル, Kakomaru)), in a puzzle game. Wagamama (ワガママー, Wagamamā) the queen of a country called Lasyland, has cast a spell and trapped Princess Ophelia in a mirror, causing the Kingdom of Bizyland (Fieldland (フィールドランド, Fīrudorando)) to become gray and dismal. King Cacoma calls on the player(s) to save the princess and the kingdom.

Enemies can impede progress of the player and come in various shapes, sizes and speeds. Some enemies can only move along the borders of the screen and the chalk lines that the player creates, others have free rein of the screen within given borders. Enemies can be destroyed by trapping them within an area of chalk, however, they will repopulate quickly thereafter. The player must avoid getting hit by enemies. If the player allows the character to get hit by the enemies too many times (based on the difficulty), they will be brought to a continue screen. Continuing costs one Credit, of which the player has a predetermined amount based on the difficulty that they are playing on. If the player runs out of the Credits, the game ends.

A visual measure of progress is implemented between rounds in the game (a round includes several landscapes that the player must complete). When a player completes a round, an incomplete image is shown which is slowly filled in as the player completes more and more rounds.

== Reception ==
Reception

Review scores
Publication	Score
AllGame	3/5
Computer and Video Games	45/100
Famitsu	18/40
Game Players	6/10
Official Nintendo Magazine	76%
Super Play	36%
Total!	4+
VideoGames & Computer Entertainment	6/10
Control	42%
SNES Force	72%
Super Action	46%
The Super Famicom	54/100
Super Pro	41/100

Cacoma Knight in Bizyland received mixed reviews.
