= ExA-Arcadia =

Arcade system board

exA-Arcadia
- Also known as: exA, EXA基板
- Developer: exA-Arcadia
- Manufacturer: exA-Arcadia
- Type: Arcade
- Released: November 27, 2019
- Media: Cartridge (4 slots)
- Operating system: Customized Microsoft Windows
- CPU: Intel Core
- Memory: 8 GB
- Display: 4K, 1080p, 768p, 720p, 480p
- Graphics: NVIDIA GeForce (not specified)
- Input: JVS, JVS'
- Power: 100–240 V 50/60 Hz
- Current firmware: 1.6.1
- Online services: None
- Dimensions: A4
- Website: exa.ac

exA-Arcadia (Note: Japanese: エクサ・アルカディア, Hepburn: Ekusa Arukadia) is a ROM cartridge-based arcade system board, released by the game company exA-Arcadia on 27 November 2019.

== History ==
Development of exA-Arcadia hardware began in September 2017. The system's first title was developed by a former Cave Interactive staff member who worked on games such as DoDonPachi and DoDonPachi SaiDaiOuJou. The platform used a custom operating system based on Microsoft Windows.

In March 2020, Cave Interactive joined exA-Arcadia to develop DoDonPachi True Death, the first EXA Label title. By September 2020, retail partners Beep and KVC Lab began selling exA-Arcadia products. The game was released on 30 November 2020, with video game distribution in Japan handled by the Japanese prize manufacturer Eikoh. In 2020, Cave Interactive announced a partnership to bring their titles, starting with DoDonPachi SaiDaiOuJou, to the exA-Arcadia platform.

Following the COVID-19 pandemic and cancellation of events, exA-Arcadia made its U.S. debut at the 2021 Amusement Expo International, a United States trade show held in Las Vegas, Nevada. A deluxe-sized American-style cabinet with a 55" (139 cm) 4K display was showcased at the event, along with 24 games on exhibition.

In 2020, the Dutch company Hawt Pink Club BV developed Hawt Pink Club, an exA-Arcadia-compatible arcade board that focuses on adult arcade games. This system made its debut at the 2020 AVN Adult Entertainment Expo in January. In April 2021, the Japanese company Hacker Global announced it would begin distributing the Hawt Pink Club product line. The system and games were exhibited at the Amusement Expo International in July 2021.

In November 2022, exA-Arcadia debuted its ARC-1 cabinet in one, two, and four-player configurations at the International Association of Amusement Parks and Attractions (IAAPA) Expo in Orlando, Florida.

In Japan, the GM Corporation (Japanese: 株式会社ジーエム商事) started distribution of exA-Arcadia products, while Genda GiGO Entertainment, which acquired all the Sega World locations, distributed exA-Arcadia conversion kits throughout Japan. In the United States, distribution was expanded through Player One Amusement Group (Cineplex Entertainment) and Moss Distributing. CSML Group started distribution in India and PT Megaindo Gemilang Lestari brought the distribution of exA-Arcadia products to Indonesia.

At the April 2024 Evolution Championship Series, held at Ariake GYM-EX, exA-Arcadia announced their new Japanese-style sit-down cabinet dubbed the ARC-32 and 10 new fighting games.

== Hardware ==
- OS: Customized Microsoft Windows
- CPU: Intel Core I3-8100
- Memory: 8 GB DDR4-2400
- Graphics: NVIDIA GeForce (not specified)
- IO: JVS and JVS', utilizing JVS to JAMMA I/O boards, compatible with JAMMA
- Resolution: 4K, 1080p, 768p, 720p, 480p (4:3), horizontal and vertical screens
- Dimensions: A4
- Media: ROM cartridge, up to 2 TB
- Compatible engines: Unity, Unreal Engine, GameMaker Studio 2, Clickteam Fusion 2.5+, Corona/Solar2D, XNA, Construct 3, Godot, STG Builder, OpenBOR, 2D Fighter Maker 2nd, Pixel Game Maker MV, HTML5
- Input latency: 0.3 frames

== Games ==
There are currently 64 (Note: This number is kept up to date by this script.) games in this list.

List of exA-Arcadia games
Title	Developer(s)	Release date	Ref.
Air Gallet EXA Label	exA-Arcadia		
Aka & Blue Type-R	Tanoshimasu	27 November 2019	
Akyrios EXA	Doragon Entertainment	12 February 2020	
Arcana Heart 3: Love Max Six Stars Xtend!!!!!	exA-Arcadia	15 December 2023	
Astro Ninja Man EXA	exA-Arcadia	29 September 2022	
Asuka 120% Burning Fest. Exallent	exA-Arcadia	11 March 1994	
Avatar Legends: The Fighting Game		2026	
Axel City 2	Project Atsuki, exA-Arcadia	3 July 2023	
Axel City 2: The Final Storm	Project Atsuki, exA-Arcadia	15 November 2025	
Bad Ass Babes Kiss	Thatcher Productions, Hawt Pink Club	23 June 2021	
Batsugun EXA Label 1.5	exA-Arcadia	16 June 2023	
Bayani	Ranida Games	12 June 2019	
Blazing Chrome AC	Joymasher	11 July 2019	
Breakers Revenge Chicago	exA-Arcadia	30 July 2024	
Cambria Sword: Another Cry	Vagues Games, exA-Arcadia	30 December 2024	
Chaos Code: Exact Xeno Attack	F K Digital, exA-Arcadia	17 April 2020	
Chaos Code: Nemesis Experiment	F K Digital, exA-Arcadia	5 November 2025	
Cosmic Digger 3671	Mindware, exA-Arcadia	2021	
Cotton Rock 'n' Roll	exA-Arcadia	February 2022	
Cotton Rock with You	Success, exA-Arcadia	December 23, 2021	
Crimson Katana EXA Label	exA-Arcadia	17 February 2022	
Cyberblocker R	exA-Arcadia	14 October 2022	
Daemon Bride exAGAIN	exA-Arcadia	28 June 2025	
Daybreak Slam	Aone Games	TBA	
Demon Front EXA Label	IGS	TBA	
DoDonPachi True Death EXA Label	exA-Arcadia	30 November 2020	
Dojo Masters EX	Pixelized Vision	July 17, 2024	
Donut Dodo Do!	Pixel Games	31 May 2023	
Dynamite Bomb!!	Light Green 8, exA-Arcadia	3 July 2023	
Earthion EXA Label	Ancient	2025	
The Fallen Angels Revenge	exA-Arcadia	TBA	
Fight of Gods: Arcade Edition	Digital Crafter	November 2020	
FixEight EXA Label	exA-Arcadia	31 October 2024	
Gimmick! Exact☆Mix	exA-Arcadia	31 December 2020	
Infinos EXA	Picorinne Soft, exA-Arcadia	21 February 2020	
Jamjam'n Jelly Exalente	Kumro Games	August 11, 2025	
Jitsu Squad Featuring Samurai Pizza Cats	Tanuki Creative Studio, exA-Arcadia	30 December 2024	
Kira Kira Star Night EXA	exA-Arcadia	11 June 2021	
The Kung Fu vs. Karate Champ	Jae-Lee Productions	31 January 2020	
Nippon Marathon Turbo	Onion Soup Interactive, exA-Arcadia	2021	
Lightning Knights	Tikipod, exA-Arcadia	June 2020	
Noisz Arc⌖Coda	Anarch Entertainment	16 June 2022	
Omen of Sorrow: Arising Chaos	Aone Games	5 May 2024	
P-47 Aces Mk. II	exA-Arcadia	29 September 2022	
Phantom Breaker: Omnia	exA-Arcadia	16 July 2024	
Psyvariar Delta AC	City Connection	December 2020	
Rage of the Dragons W	exA-Arcadia	TBA	
Rising Eclipse			
Rival Megagun XE	Spacewave Software, exA-Arcadia	2021	
Rumble Storm X	StudioS, Hawt Pink Club	8 July 2022	
Samurai Shodown V Perfect	exA-Arcadia	29 September 2022	
Shakuga: The Excommunication	ISAmu, Hawt Pink Club	TBA	
Shadow Gangs X	JKM Corp	19 May 2022	
Shikhondo: Red Purgatory	Deer Farm, exA-Arcadia	September 2020	
Shinorubi Pink Label	Last Boss 88	August 2024	
Strania: The Stella Machina EX	G.rev, exA-Arcadia	2 September 2020	
Strip Fighter 5: Arcade Edition	StudioS, Hawt Pink Club	TBA	
Super Battle Princess Madelyn	Monster Bath Games	November 2020	
Tattoo Assassins	exA-Arcadia	TBA	
Touhou Perfect Sakura Fantastica	exA-Arcadia	28 July 2022	
Touhou Scarlet Diabolique Fantastica	exA-Arcadia	21 March 2024	
Umineko Golden Fantasia Cross ExAceed			
Vanguard Princess R	F K Digital, exA-Arcadia	TBA	
Vritra Hexa	neotro	November 2020	
Wild Guns Rawhide	exA-Arcadia	TBA	
