= Blazing Chrome =

2019 video game

Blazing Chrome Blazing Chrome AC
- Developer: JoyMasher
- Publishers: The Arcade Crew exA-Arcadia (AC)
- Producer: Thais Weiller
- Designer: Danilo Dias
- Programmer: Iuri Nery
- Artist: Danilo Dias
- Composers: Dominic Ninmark; Tiago Santos; Motoaki Furukawa (AC)
- Engine: GameMaker Studio
- Platforms: Windows; PlayStation 4; Xbox One; Switch; exA-Arcadia
- Release: July 11, 2019
- Genre: Run and gun
- Modes: Single-player, multiplayer

Blazing Chrome is a run and gun video game developed by JoyMasher and published by The Arcade Crew. The game was released on July 11, 2019 for Windows, Nintendo Switch, PlayStation 4, and Xbox One. The game is set in the post-apocalyptic future of 21XX, following a war that nearly kills off the human race. A robot army rules the world, and attempt to destroy the remnants of humanity. The game follows a resistance group who fights back against them. Players can control two different characters: Mavra, a human resistance soldier, and Doyle, a robot reprogrammed to fight for the resistance.

Blazing Chrome received generally favorable reviews from critics, being frequently compared to the Contra games. In 2021, an enhanced version titled Blazing Chrome AC was released in arcades on exA-Arcadia.

== Gameplay ==
Blazing Chrome is a side-scrolling run and gun with gameplay similar to Contra and Metal Slug. Players take on the role of resistance fighters Mavra and Doyle, fighting off robotic enemies across multiple levels. It can be played single-player or in a two-player local cooperative mode. There are six levels in total; four are already unlocked, and two have to be unlocked. Players can run, jump, and dodge. There are four weapons in the game: a machine gun, a grenade launcher, an energy whip, and a particle cannon. Players are equipped with a machine gun at the start of each level and can pick up more weapons as they progress. Melee attacks are performed if a player attempts to shoot an enemy at close range.

Players can only be hit once, losing a life if they are shot by or touch an enemy. The amount of lives that players have depends on the difficulty selected at the start of the game. Three different assist robots can be collected in each level. Only one bot can be equipped at a time. Attack bots fire when the player fires, increasing the player's damage output. Defense bots shield the player, allowing them to take two extra hits before breaking. Speed bots increase the player's movement speed and fire rate. Speed bots also give players the ability to jump twice, allowing players to access hard-to-reach areas. Equipped bots and weapons, excluding the machine gun, will be dropped if the player dies.

=== Blazing Chrome AC ===
This arcade version adds the playable character Zaku from Oniken, another game by JoyMasher. Zaku plays more like a melee character but can throw long range grenades. Motoaki Furukawa, the music composer of Konami's Super Contra, composed a new soundtrack for this version.

== Development ==
Blazing Chrome was developed by Brazilian game studio JoyMasher. After the first trailer for the game was released in March 2018, a game demo of Blazing Chrome was featured at PAX East 2018 held in April, showing off the game's mechanics. The Arcade Crew released a gameplay preview on June 28, showing two players riding hoverbikes and fighting enemies on a train. Blazing Chrome was released on July 11, 2019, for Windows, Nintendo Switch, PlayStation 4, and Xbox One, and later for Amazon Luna on November 19, 2020.

JoyMasher primarily took inspiration from the Metal Slug and Contra games. Developer Danilo Dias, a fan of the games, wanted to combine the mechanical bosses of Metal Slug and the "speed and frenetic style" of Contra. The game's backgrounds were influenced by Irem games such as GunForce II, being designed to look "ruined and extremely detailed".

== Reception ==
Reception

Aggregate score
Aggregator	Score
Metacritic	PC: 79/100 (Note: Score based on 14 reviews); PS4: 76/100 (Note: Score based on 17 reviews); XONE: 82/100 (Note: Score based on 8 reviews); NS: 79/100 (Note: Score based on 15 reviews)

Review scores
Publication	Score
Destructoid	8.5/10
GameRevolution	8/10
Hardcore Gamer	3.5/5
Nintendo Life	9/10
Nintendo World Report	8/10
PCMag	4.5/5
Push Square	8/10
GamingBolt	9/10
Windows Central	4.5/5

Blazing Chrome received "generally favorable" reviews according to review aggregator Metacritic.

Alex Santa Maria of GameRevolution praised the game's challenge and presentation, but criticized the "unforgiving" difficulty curve and "outdated" control scheme. Nintendo Life's Ollie Reynolds agreed that the game's difficulty was "brutal", though he praised the gameplay, visuals, and "spectacular" boss battles.

Push Square's Jamie O'Neill gave the game 8/10 stars, lauding the art, unlockable characters, and set pieces, but also wrote that the difficulty of the genre "may be off-putting". Windows Central reviewer Asher Madan described Blazing Chrome as "one of the best" of its genre, praising the visuals, controls, and level variety. Madan felt that the game had a "steep" difficulty curve and criticized the campaign's short length.

Jeffrey L. Wilson from PCMag recommended the game for its co-op gameplay, visuals, and variety of power-ups and weapons, but was disappointed by the lack of online co-op and an issue with the game's platforming.

Will Borger from GamingBolt rated the game 9/10, commending the art, design, and soundtrack. He likened the game to Contra, writing that Blazing Chrome "captures the feel" of the game, but also felt that it could be frustrating. Borger concluded his review by calling Blazing Chrome a "loving tribute" to the Contra and Metal Slug games.

Destructoid's Chris Carter was impressed by the bosses and called the sound design "superb". Carter ended his review by writing that it "pays extreme homage to the Contra series".

Hardcore Gamer's Chris Shive noted the influence that Contra had on the game, and described Blazing Chrome as "fun to play", but believed that the game did not "bring anything new" to the genre.

Neal Ronaghan from Nintendo World Report gave Blazing Chrome an 8/10, positively comparing it to Contra while praising the style and feel of the game. Ronaghan felt that the game was hindered by the occasional slowdown, and believed that using high scores was "functionally meaningless".
