= DoDonPachi SaiDaiOuJou =

2012 video game

- Developers: Cave exA-Arcadia (EXA Label); Live Wire (Switch)
- Publishers: Cave exA-Arcadia (EXA Label); Live Wire (Switch)
- Directors: Tsuneki Ikeda, Hiroyuki Kimura
- Producer: Tsuneki Ikeda
- Designer: NAGI/S.E.C (character)
- Programmers: Yuji Inoue; Daisuke Koizumi; Shinobu Yagawa
- Composer: Manabu Namiki
- Series: DonPachi
- Platforms: Arcade; exA-Arcadia; Nintendo Switch; Xbox 360
- Release: Arcade: JP: April 20, 2012; WW: November, 2020 (EXA Label); Xbox 360: JP: May 30, 2013; Nintendo Switch: WW: December 19, 2024
- Genre: Bullet Hell
- Modes: Single-player, multiplayer
- Arcade system: CAVE CV1000-D exA-Arcadia (EXA Label)

DoDonPachi SaiDaiOuJou (怒首領蜂 最大往生, Dodonpachi Saidaiōjō) is a 2012 vertically scrolling bullet hell arcade game released by Cave, and the sixth chapter in Cave's DonPachi series.

== Gameplay ==
Arcade version screenshot.

Game scoring is similar to that of DaiOuJou. The biggest difference in scoring is that the chain hit counter does not reset immediately when the chain meter empties; the counter instead drops by 25% and decreases quickly until the chain continues. The chain meter can be kept above zero by using the laser.

Hyper mechanics have once again changed from the previous games. Hypers are obtained the same way one can obtain them in Daioujou, by collecting bee medals and racking up large combos. However, they have a max level of 10 and can be activated once the meter fills up, like in DoDonPachi Resurrection. In addition, Hypers can be built up much more quickly through obtaining point items called stars. This can be done through defeating enemies, or by cancelling bullets via destroying larger enemies. Hypers increase the firepower of the player's shot and laser but do not cancel bullets like in Resurrection.

The arcade release has an "overflow glitch" that, when triggered, results in scores that are otherwise impossible. The "get point" counter beside the chain meter must exceed 21,474,836, at which point the score increases at an unintended fast rate. This glitch is removed in version 1.5.

Unlike past entries in the DoDonPachi series, the game has no second loop. The five stages each has eight bee medals to collect and a boss at the end. Following the defeat of stage 5 boss Taisabachi, the giant mechanical bee, a more difficult fight may follow if requirements are met. If every bee medal is collected in at least three stages and the player does not die more than once during the game, Hibachi will appear. If the player has collected all bee medals in the game, did not die once, and did not use a single bomb, an even more difficult boss will replace Hibachi: her evil alter ego, Inbachi.

=== EXA Label ===
Developed and released by exA-Arcadia in November 2020 for the exA-Arcadia arcade system, Dodonpachi Saidaioujou EXA Label in Japan or Dodonpachi True Death EXA Label outside of Japan is the first international release of the game and includes 4 selectable play modes: Original, EXA Label, X Arrange and Inbachi. The Type D ship from the Xbox 360 version is now playable in all modes. Original mode is a remaster of the original arcade version featuring new information gadgets, HD graphics and sound. EXA Label mode includes a dynamic difficulty system based on the players performance and focuses on bullet canceling. X Arrange mode is a revised version of the arrange mode from the Xbox 360 version which eliminates the ongoing talking from Type D and incorporates the mode's life and bomb meter system. Inbachi mode allows the player to fight the true last boss Inbachi at max rank and 5 lives. By holding down a specific direction on the joystick or button on the mode select screen, one can modify the presentation of the game, and can even activate the overflow glitch as seen in the original arcade release. Both the original stereo soundtrack and the arranged soundtrack are selectable in every play mode. The input latency has been decreased to 1 frame using exA-Arcadia's technology. A new key visual illustration was drawn by the original designer, NAGI.

=== Characters ===
The game has four fighters to choose from, each piloted by an Element Doll:

- Type A: fast with concentrated front fire piloted by Shuri (red) CV: Yukana
- Type B: moderate speed with subshots following movement, piloted by Hikari (green) CV: Eri Kitamura
- Type C: slow speed and widespread fire piloted by Maria (blue) CV: Mamiko Noto
- Type D: a unique fighter exclusive to the Xbox 360 and exA-Arcadia versions piloted by Saya (purple) CV: Aya Hirano

Other Characters:

- Operator (Game Operator System) CV: Asami Shimoda
- Hibachi/Hina/Inbachi (Boss) CV: Aoi Yuuki

Inbachi is the "evil side" of Hibachi.

== Plot ==
The game is set within an alternate timeline from other DonPachi games, with all characters from previous games abandoned. In the past, the Element Doll Electronics Laboratory was designing the ultimate Element Doll to assist the human species, dubbed "Project Haruuara." The first units produced were Extra Z-001 "Hina" and Extra Z-002 "Saya." Though they lived as twin sisters and were taught the importance of closeness with humans, they were trained as enemies in combat. When Hina decided that the ultimate answer to humanity's problems was to eliminate the human person, she went berserk. The project was immediately shut down and both Hina and Saya were deactivated. Prior to the beginning of the game, Hina was mysteriously told to "save everybody" and was reactivated, destroying the laboratory and the chamber in which she was sealed. She disappeared after the incident, with her whereabouts unknown to both Donpachi Corps. and Saya, who was still active when she was discovered as one of the few survivors of Element Dolls.

Hina, now going by the name Hibachi, controls an entire weaponry computer system, governing from deep within the technologically advanced City of Ideal, a paradise where humans live in harmony with nature. Believing that the only way to save humankind is to have them adopt a better form, she begins a war to force all humans to become machines. Hastily, the remaining humans of Earth revive the ancient DonPachi Corps to fight Hibachi's army of mechanized people. The new DonPachi's mission is to destroy Hina/Hibachi and her powerful computer system.

When the pilot faces Hibachi in the final stage, she expresses her realization that humans are the ultimate form with her last words.

There is also a True Ending if Saya is the player's Element Doll. When Hina/Hibachi is shot down in the first round, Saya tries to talk and convince her to stop, but before they can reach other, the virus corrupts Hina's body and she is transformed into Inbachi (easier version of the original Arcade). The battle is hard, but the pilot and Saya successfully defeat Hibachi and Inbachi and Hina returns to normal. The ending shows Hina damaged and dying in Saya's arms, with little energy remaining. They have a last conversation where Hina is deeply regretful for her actions, but thankful for Saya to come after her. With her last words, Hina says she loves her sister and dies, with Saya crying out for her.

After the credits, Saya is standing into the cliff of a mountain wearing Hina's ribbons in memory into her pigtails looking into the Sun, but she smiles when the Pilot comes to her aid, for what she is truly grateful.

== Development and release ==
Three main gameplay modes are featured in the Xbox 360 release: the original arcade version containing the infamous "overflow glitch," the exclusive tweaked version 1.5 created as a response to player feedback, and the somewhat different Xbox 360 mode similar to Cave's usual console-only "arrange modes," featuring remixed music, considerably more voice acting, tweaked mechanics, and a single life/bomb meter in place of the usual spare lives.

At launch, three Xbox 360 editions were released: regular edition, limited edition, and super limited edition. The regular edition included only the game. The limited-edition included the game plus an arranged soundtrack, a steelbook case, and a small art book. The super limited edition included the game plus both the arranged and standard soundtracks, a steelbook case, a full-sized art book, and stickers. A Japanese-region free release was released on May 30, 2013.

An enhanced definitive version, titled DoDonPachi SaiDaiOuJou EXA Label in Japan and officially localized as DoDonPachi True Death EXA Label internationally, was released for the exA-Arcadia arcade platform in November 2020.

== Reception and legacy ==
Reception

Review score
Publication	Score
Famitsu	33/40

Famitsu magazine awarded Dodonpachi Saidaioujou a score of 33/40 based on four reviews (9/8/8/8).

Within the bullet hell genre, Saidaioujou became famous for its difficulty. The game's true final boss (Inbachi) is so difficult that it would not be beaten, without using continues, until 12 years after the game's release.

The game was ported to Nintendo Switch by Live Wire, and released on December 19, 2024.
