= Chaos Code =

Japanese video game released in 2011

- Genres: Fighting, Visual novel
- Developer: FK Digital
- Publishers: JP: FK Digital (Sign of Catastrophe), Arc System Works (NESiCAxLive and consoles), exA-Arcadia [2020s arcades]); NA: Arc System Works; EU: Arc System Works
- Creators: Mickey Lin; Michael Lin (until 2016); Tetsu
- Platforms: Arcade (RingWide, NESiCAxLive, exA-Arcadia); PlayStation 3; Microsoft Windows; PlayStation 4; PlayStation Vita; Nintendo Switch
- First release: Chaos Code; August 4, 2011
- Latest release: Chaos Code: Nemesis Experiment; November 5, 2025

Chaos Code is a fighting game series developed by FK Digital.

== Games ==
=== Chaos Code Expansion Updates ===
Chaos Code: (New) Sign of Catastrophe / Exact Xeno Attack
- Developer: FK Digital
- Publishers: FK Digital (Sign of Catastrophe); Arc System Works (NESiCAxLive and consoles) exA-Arcadia (2020s Arcade)
- Director: Mickey Lin
- Producers: Mickey Lin; Michael Lin (until 2016); Tetsu
- Designers: Mickey Lin; Michael Lin (until 2016); BAN; A26 - Sakura ros kerbe god Aloner
- Artists: BAN; A-Shian, MAKAI
- Composers: Mint Jam nekono Kou -45
- Platforms: Arcade; PlayStation 3; Microsoft Windows; PlayStation 4; Nintendo Switch
- Release: August 4, 2011: Arcade; JP: August 4, 2011 (Sign of Catastrophe); JP: June 6, 2013 (New Sign of Catastrophe); WW: March 27, 2020 (Exact Xeno Attack) PlayStation 3; JP: April 3, 2013; NA: September 3, 2013; EU: March 26, 2014; AU: July 2, 2014 Windows, PlayStation 4; JP: November 9, 2016 (PS4); WW: March 15, 2017 Nintendo Switch; WW: March 26, 2020
- Genre: Fighting
- Modes: Single-player, multiplayer
- Arcade system: RingWide (Sign of Catastrophe); NESiCAxLive (New Sign of Catastrophe) exA-Arcadia (Exact Xeno Attack)

The first game known as Chaos Code: Sign of Catastrophe was released for Sega's RingWide arcade system board on August 4, 2011. A port for the PlayStation 3 was first released on December 19, 2012, on Hong Kong's PlayStation Network, followed by subsequent home releases in both Japan and North America in 2013 and the PAL region in 2014. Additionally, it adds additional characters, balance adjustments, new game modes (such as training, versus and gallery modes), and has made the arcade version's last boss, Kudlak-Sin, a playable character

A remastered version, Chaos Code: New Sign of Catastrophe, was released on arcades on June 6, 2013, and on PlayStation 4 and Windows on March 15, 2017. It features a new online mode and two new characters. The game was ported to the Nintendo Switch and released on March 26, 2020. An upgraded version of New Sign of Catastrophe known as Chaos Code: Exact Xeno Attack was ported by FK Digital and exA-Arcadia in 2020. This version decreases input lag down to 2 frames, adds 16 color palette choices to each character and fixes the slowdown which occurs on certain stages of the arcade version of Chaos Code: New Sign of Catastrophe.

=== Chaos Code: Nemesis Experiment ===
Chaos Code: Nemesis Experiment
- Developer: FK Digital
- Publisher: exA-Arcadia
- Director: Mickey Lin
- Producers: Mickey Lin; Tetsu
- Designers: Mickey Lin; BAN; A26 - Sakura ros kerbe god Aloner
- Artists: BAN; A-Shian, MAKAI
- Composers: Mint Jam nekono Kou -45
- Platform: Arcade
- Release: Arcade: JP: November 5, 2025
- Genre: Fighting
- Modes: Single-player, multiplayer
- Arcade system: exA-Arcadia

The sequel title originally known as Chaos Code NEXT, (Note: Tentatively Chaos Code: Next Episode of Xtreme Tempest) was teased at Toushinsai 2016 as an in-work sequel title in Japanese arcades. The teasers were shown in Toushinsai 2017 and FKDCup 2018, and a character Kagari receives a new version which serves as a default variant for this game. The tentative title was revealed during Evo Japan 2020. However, FK Digital confirmed on February 9, 2020, that the sequel has been postponed for one year, possibly due to COVID-19 pandemic and since the passing of the series' co-creator, Mickey's younger brother, Michael, on Christmas 2017, two months after Toushinsai 2017 teaser gameplay of Chaos Code NEXT was released. A year later on February 18, 2021, the series’ producer, Mickey Lin confirmed on his Twitter that FK Digital has returned to the development of Chaos Code NEXT. It was announced at Angels of Battle on April 2, 2022, that the Chaos Code Next demo will be exhibited at the same booth as soon as the latest update title of the first game is over at the KGP division of FK Digital on April 30, 2022. During EVO Japan 2024, exA-Arcadia revealed that the newly titled Chaos Code; Nemesis Experiment will be released in arcades on exA-Arcadia. It was originally planned to be released on 2024, but was delayed to November 5, 2025, on its early operation.

== Gameplay ==
The game uses a standard 8-way lever and four button (weak punch, weak kick, strong punch, strong kick) system. Characters can be customized prior to the fight, such as selecting two "edit special moves" from four possibilities to go along with the character's built-in attacks. Players can also select between "run" and "step" modes, placing the focus respectively on speed and technical play. The game makes use of a couple of systems that can quickly change the flow of battle, besides :

- Guard Break and Tactical Guard/NEX Strike: Guard Break is a slow attack which breaks opponent's guard; while Tactical Guard is a parry counter that can also be done in the air, yet susceptible against throws. Both cost one half of bar meter. Previously, both uses a super bar prior to being merge to NEX Gauge system under a merge system called "NEX Strike".
- Chaos Shift/NEX Drive: A Roman Cancel-like state which can cancel special moves as well as supers at cost of one half of bar meter. In the first game, known as "Chaos Shift", it uses a half of super bar, until Chaos Code NEXT has the cancellation system becomes part of the NEX Gauge system under the name "NEX Drive".
- Exceed Chaos: Place the character into a special status which requires full bar of meter to activate with and grants them three properties, consists combo limitation removal, health bar recovery and the reduction of dizzy bar. It is later become part of NEX system, under the name "NEXT Exceed Chaos", where it still allows character to use both super and NEX gauge systems, but this time can use Destruction Chaos move.
- Destruction Chaos: A high level super move that, if successfully connects, can eliminate half of the opponent's life gauge. Prior to Chaos Code NEXT, it cannot be used during Exceed Chaos. As of NEXT, it now depletes the opponent's NEX system to auto refill the attacking character.

Chaos Code NEXT adds new features:

- NEX System: A separate two-bars-based auto-refill meter. Exceed Chaos, Tactical Guard, Guard Breaker and Chaos Shift are integrated to this system, rather than costing super bars.
- Updated universal gameplay such as dash attacks can now be done after forward dash, while cancelling to Super Jump can now be perform with just an up input.
- Most stages' environments are now rendered in 3D.

== Characters ==
Introduced in Chaos Code Expansion Updates

- Bravo Peperoncine
- Cait & Sith Whisker
- Celia
- Celia II Kai
- Cerberus Black
- Cthylla
- Heihachi "Catherine" Katori
- Hermes Gberardini
- Hikaru Otagi (Note: Has a variant called "MG Hikaru", who then serves as a main and separate variant in Nemesis Experiment. Formerly alternate hidden variant of original Hikaru) (Note: Original version serves as one of the two bonus bosses in a single stage in Nemesis Experiment. First round start from Kagari, then Hikaru. Defeated by either of them will result game over. Separate playable slots for original Hikaru and Kagari are added via time release updates)
- Kagari (Note: The other version of Kagari in Nemesis Experiment is actually Kurenai, who goes by the name "KAGARI".)
- Kudlak-Sin Aimar (Note: Originally non-playable; made playable beginning in console release of Sign of Catastrophe)
- Lupinus (Note: Added in New Sign of Catastrophe)
- Ray
- Rui Mishima
- Vein the Rakshasa

Introduced in Nemesis Experiment

- Kurenai
- Gou Takemoto
- Dunkel Vertex (Note: Originally non-playable at launch of Nemesis Experiment. Later becomes one of the post-launch time release playable characters in the game)

== Reception ==
Metacritics scores PlayStation 3 version of Sign of Catastrophe at 61, as it is criticized for its unbalanced gameplay and the lack of online play. Ultimately, in response, remastered version, New Sign of Catastrophe receives higher metascore at 66 than its previous counterpart, as the critics praises for the inclusion of the online play and balanced gameplay.
