= Musya =

1992 video game

- Japanese SFC box art
- Developer: Jorudan
- Publishers: JP: Datam Polystar; NA: SETA USA
- Platform: Super NES
- Release: JP: April 21, 1992; NA: December 1992
- Genre: Platform
- Mode: Single-player

Musya (Note: Japanese: 豪槍神雷伝説 MUSYA 武者, Hepburn: Gōsō Jinrai Densetsu Musha; lit. "Musha: Legend of the Brave Spearman Jinrai") is a 1992 platform game developed by Jorudan for the Super Nintendo Entertainment System. The game was released by Datam Polystar in Japan on April 21, 1992, followed by English localized version produced by SETA USA and released in North America in December 1992. The title, which translates to "Warrior", is romanized in the Kunrei-shiki style (Musya) instead of the Hepburn romanization style (Musha), likely to avoid confusion with the unrelated Sega Genesis game MUSHA.

== Gameplay ==
Imoto, bearing 16 units of health (Qi (気 Ki, meaning "life energy")), dies when the health is depleted. He carries up to three lives (命 Inochi). The game starts with three lives; once the life count is zero and Imoto dies, the game ends. When Imoto defeats a boss, the words "monster defeated" (怨霊調伏 Onryō Chōfuku, "Vengeful Ghost Submitted") appear and the player gains a scroll containing a new spell.

== Plot ==
Musya follows a pikeman (described as a spearman in the Japanese version) named Imoto (Jinrai (神雷) in the Japanese version), who must descend to the abyss to save Shizuka, a maiden. After Imoto survives a battle in which all other combatants perish, he travels to Tengumura Village, where he collapses. The mayor, Akagi (who is not named in the Japanese version), greets Imoto and tells him that Shizuka (しずか) needs to be rescued. Imoto heads into Tengumura Cavern (known in the Japanese version as Kihōshōnyūdō (鬼宝鍾乳洞)).

== Regional differences ==
The game received several edits for the North American edition. For instance, the large testes of the tanuki character were removed for the North American edition. In addition, the manji (卍) shown to reveal the amount of spell scrolls held was edited away.

The Japanese version of the game is one of the few games that uses Japanese numerals. The English version uses Arabic numerals.

Japanese dialogue is replaced with English-language dialogue. In addition, Musya uses Japanese kanji characters in various parts of the game to represent modes and levels. For instance, in the Japanese version of the game, the English-language word "Pause" is not used; instead the word Ippuku (一服, meaning "break" or "to take a break") appears from both ends of the screen. In the English-language version, the word "Pause" forms under the word "Ippuku," with the "Pa" under the "一" and the "Use" under the "服."

The tagline for the Japanese version is "Japanesque Horror Action" (ジャパネスク・ホラー・アクション), which was changed to "The Classic Tale of Japanese Horror" for the U.S. version.

== Reception ==
Reception

Review scores
| Publication | Score |
|---|---|
| Famitsu | 5/10, 4/10, 5/10, 4/10 |
| GameFan | 67%, 69%, 70%, 73% |
| Super Play | 3/10 |
| Total! | 59% |
| Control | 43% |
| SNES Force | 60% |
| Super Action | 35% |
| The Super Famicom | 54/100 |
| Super Gamer | 45% |
| Super Pro | 45% |

The Japanese publication Micom BASIC Magazine ranked Musya twentieth in popularity in its July 1992 issue, and it received a 20.02/30 score in a 1993 readers' poll conducted by Super Famicom Magazine, ranking among Super Famicom titles at the number 134 spot. The game received mixed reviews from critics.
