= Family Soft =

Japanese video game company

FamilySoft Co., Ltd. 株式会社ファミリーソフト
- Industry: Video games
- Founded: 1987; 39 years ago
- Headquarters: Nerima, Tokyo, Japan
- Website: Official website

FamilySoft Co., Ltd. (株式会社ファミリーソフ) is a Japanese company founded in 1987 and headquartered in Nerima, Tokyo. Since its establishment, FamilySoft has been doing business in the field of game development and publishing. They develop and publish mainly adventure, fighting, gyaruge, and war games. Some of the Mobile Suit Gundam and Macross titles were produced by the company. FamilySoft also produced games based on other anime, like Area 88, Crusher Joe, Aura Battler Dunbine, Armored Trooper Votoms or Science Ninja Team Gatchaman. In 1992, FamilySoft also established an adult game manufacturer, APPLE PIE Co., Ltd.

Asuka 120% is their most notable franchise; however, only a few were published by other companies, including ASK (a company related to Asmik Ace Entertainment), and the franchise was mainly developed by Fill-in-Cafe. After Fill-in-Cafe filed for bankruptcy, Family Soft purchased the rights to most of their products.

== Video games ==
=== FM Towns ===
- Mobile Suit Gundam: Hyper Classic Operation (1992)
- Mobile Suit Gundam: Hyper Desert Operation (1992)
- Asuka 120% BURNING Fest. (1994)
- Asuka 120% Excellent BURNING Fest. (1994)
- Mad Stalker: Full Metal Force (1994)
- Abel: Shin Mokushiroku Taisen (1995)

=== MSX ===
- Keiji Daidaigeki: Shachou Reijou Yuuka Jiken (1987)
- MS Field: Kidou Senshi Gundam (1988)
- Gal Nanpa Dasakusen (1988)
- Itaden Ikase Otoko 1: Bakushi ni Aitai (1989)
- Itaden Ikase Otoko 2: Jinsei no Imi (1989)
- Itaden Ikase Otoko 3: Sengohen (1989)
- Itaten Ikase Otoko Nyuumon o Arigatou (1990)
- MS Field Kidou Senshi Gundam Plus Kit (1990)
- MS Field Kidou Senshi Gundam Plus Kit Tsuki (1990)
- Seisenshi Dunbine (1991)
- Seisenshi Dunbine: Shou (1992)
- MSX Train (1992)
- Ryuu no Hanazono (1992)
- Seisenshi Dunbine: Shita (1992)
- MSX Train 2 (1993)
- MSX Free Software 100-Sen (1994)

=== PC-98 ===
- Muteki Keiji Daidageki: Shijō Saidai no Hanzai (1990)
- Aura Battler Dunbine: Byston Well no Honoo (1991)
- Aura Battler Dunbine Tsuika Scenario
- Magical Story Series: Majokko Kumi (1991)
- Magical Story Series Part 2: Mahō Shōjo Rina (1992)
- Chō Jikū Yōsai Macross: Remember Me (1993)
- Mobile Suit Gundam: Return of Zion (1993)
- Mobile Suit Gundam: A Year of War (1993)
- Kagaku Ninjatai Gatchaman (1994)
- Crusher Joe: Kanraku Wakusei no Inbou (1994)
- Chō Jikū Yōsai Macross: Skull Leader (1994)
- Chō Jikū Yōsai Macross: Love Stories (1994)
- Chō Jikū Yōsai Macross: Complete Pack (1995)
- Chō Jikū Yōsai Macross: Complete Pack HD Senyou (1995)
- Area 88: Ikkakujuu no Kiseki (1995)
- Area 88: Etranger 1995 (1995)
- Mobile Suit Gundam 0083: Stardust Operation (1996)

=== PlayStation ===
- Metamoru Panic: Doki Doki Youma Busters!! (1995)
- Asuka 120% Special: Burning Fest Special (1996)
- Asuka 120% Excellent: Burning Fest. Excellent (1997, 2011)
- Mad Stalker: Full Metal Force (1997)
- Hatsukoi Valentine (1997)
- Wakusei Koukitai Little Cats (1998)
- Hatsukoi Valentine Special (1998)
- Asuka 120% Final: Burning Fest. Final (1999)
- Community Pom: Omoide o Dakishimete (1997)

=== Sega Dreamcast ===
- Rose Crusaders (1999, 2000)
- Asuka 120% Burning Fest: Return (2000)

=== Sharp X68000 ===
- Armored Trooper Votoms: Dead Ash (1991)
- Mobile Suit Gundam: Classic Operation (1991)
- Mobile Suit Gundam: Classic Operation - Original Scenario Disk (1992)
- Square Resort: Hyper Senshasen (1992)
- War Torn Versnag: Versnag Senran (1993)
- Mad Stalker: Full Metal Force (1994)
- Asuka 120% BURNING Fest. (1994)

=== Windows ===
- Asuka 120% Burning Fest: Return (1999)
