= Masatoshi Imaizumi =

Japanese video game designer

- Occupation(s): video game designer and programmer

Masatoshi Imaizumi (今泉 正稔, Imaizumi Masatoshi) is a video game designer and programmer at R.U.N (Release Universe Network) and a former Fill-in-Cafe game designer. In 1998, he left Fill-in-Cafe due to the developer filing for bankruptcy. On December 19, 2005, he established the company R.U.N with former Treasure employee Masaki Ukyo.

== Works ==
Game designer

- Asuka 120% Burning Fest franchise (except the last two titles)
- Mad Stalker: Full Metal Force (with Masaki Ukyo)
- Makeruna! Makendō 2: Kimero Youkai Souri (Sony PlayStation version)
- Panzer Bandit
- Phantom Breaker (with Masaki Ukyo)

Programmer

- Asuka 120% BURNING Fest. franchise (except the last two titles)
- Mad Stalker: Full Metal Force (with Masaki Ukyo)

Graphic designer

- Mad Stalker: Full Metal Force

Special thanks

- Kakutō Haō Densetsu Algunos
