= Kendo Rage =

1993 video game

- North American cover art
- Developer: Affect
- Publishers: JP: Datam Polystar; NA: SETA
- Producer: Tom Shizuma
- Composer: Takahiro Wakuta
- Platform: Super NES/Famicom
- Release: JP: January 22, 1993; NA: October 1993
- Genres: Action game, platformer
- Mode: Single-player

Kendo Rage, known in Japan as Makeruna! Makendō (負けるな!魔剣道; "Do Not Lose! Kendo Magic"), is an action video game for the Super Nintendo Entertainment System/Super Famicom by Datam Polystar. SETA published the English version.

== Gameplay ==
Kendo Rage is a 2D action side scrolling game. The player controls a fighter that is equipped with a kendo stick capable of melee attacks, and several ranged attacks. Certain combos and attacks can be used when the player's energy bar (known as 'Psy' in the game) is appropriately charged. There is a boss at the end of each stage, with seven stages total. The player begins the game at 04:00, and progress is shown by how fast each stage is completed rather than through a point system.

== Plot ==
The original Japanese version of the game stars a girl named Mai Tsurugino (剣野 舞, Tsurugino Mai). A spirit detective named Doro (ドロ) finds Mai and asks her to help him attack monsters.

In the English version of the game, an American girl named Josephine "Jo" goes to Japan to attend a summer kendo school. Her personal trainer, Osaki "Bob" Yoritomo, asks her to fight monsters on the way to school.

== Release ==
Makeruna! Makendō was released for the Super Famicom on January 22, 1993.

It was released in North America as Kendo Rage in October 1993 and published by SETA.

== Reception ==
Reception

Review scores
Publication	Score
Famitsu	5/10, 7/10, 6/10, 6/10
Game Players	7/10
GameFan	69%, 70%, 65%, 59%
Super Play	55%
Total!	56%
Hippon Super!	6/10
Marukatsu Super Famicom	8/10, 7/10, 7/10, 8/10
Oprainfall	3/5
The Super Famicom	61/100
VideoGames	6/10

Kendo Rage received a 20.68/30 score in a 1993 readers' poll conducted by Super Famicom Magazine, ranking among Super Famicom titles at the number 149 spot. The game also received average reviews.

== Legacy ==
An OVA series, Makeruna! Makendo, closely follows the original Japanese version of the game, featuring both Mai and her younger sister Hikari (the main character from the second game).

A fighting game follow-up titled Makeruna! Makendō 2: Kimero Youkai Souri was released for the Super Famicom and PlayStation. A role-playing video game titled Makeruna! Makendō Z was released for the PC-FX.
