= Datam Polystar =

Japanese media company

Datam Polystar Co., Ltd.
- Native name: 株式会社 データム・ポリスター
- Romanized name: Kabushiki-gaisha Dātamu Porisutā
- Company type: Subsidiary
- Industry: Video game industry
- Founded: May 30, 1990; 36 years ago
- Defunct: February 7, 2019
- Headquarters: Chiyoda, Tokyo, Japan
- Key people: Yukio Kakehi, Hisahiro Ando
- Products: Video games created by Datam Polystar
- Parent: ASCII MediaWorks
- Website: www.datam.co.jp

Datam Polystar Co, Ltd. (株式会社 データム・ポリスター, Kabushiki-gaisha Dātamu Porisutā) was a Japanese media company headquartered in Chiyoda, Tokyo.

The company was founded in May 1990 when the game music division of the record company Polystar spun off and became an independent company. Upon becoming independent, it entered the video game market and in the late 1990s, gained fame with the "Roommate" series. The company also released a number of video game soundtracks for companies like Sega and Sony. After the release of the album Takemoto Izumi Uta Kore in 2009, it became dormant until it was fully dissolved and liquidated on February 7, 2019.

Yukio Kakehi was the company's president for the entirety of its existence.

== Video games created by Datam Polystar ==
=== Super Famicom ===
- Cacoma Knight (English version was published by SETA Corporation)
- Makeruna Makendou (English version was published by SETA Corporation)
- Makeruna! Makendō 2: Kimero Youkai Souri
- Musya (English version was published by SETA Corporation)
- Youchiensenki Madara (also titled Madara Saga)

=== Sega Saturn ===
- Dragon Master Silk
- Sugoventure! Dragon Master Silk Gaiden

=== PlayStation ===
- Makeruna! Makendō 2
- Pocke-Kano: Aida Yumi
- Pocke-Kano: Houjouin Shizuka
- Pocke-Kano: Ueno Fumio

=== Dreamcast ===
- Inoue Ryouko: Last Scene
- Pocke-Kano: Yumi - Shizuka - Fumio
- Roommate Novel: Sato Yuka

=== PlayStation 2 ===
- Trizeal (Japanese PlayStation 2 version)
- Pure Pure Mimi to Shippo no Monogatari
- Roommate Asami: Okusama wa Joshikousei
