= Makeruna! Makendō 2: Kimero Youkai Souri =

1995 video game

Makeruna! Makendō 2
- Super Famicom cover art
- Developers: Success, Opus (SFC); Fill-in-Cafe (PS)
- Publisher: Datam Polystar
- Designer: Masatoshi Imaizumi (PS)
- Platforms: Super Famicom, PlayStation
- Release: Super Famicom: JP: March 17, 1995; PlayStation: JP: November 10, 1995
- Genre: Fighting game
- Modes: Single-player, multiplayer

Makeruna! Makendō 2: Kimero Youkai Souri (負けるな!魔剣道2 決めろ!妖怪総理大臣; lit. Don't Lose! Kendo Magic 2: Do it! Specter Prime Minister), also known as Kendo Rage 2, is a 1995 fighting game released exclusively in Japan for the Super Famicom by Datam Polystar. It was re-released for the PlayStation.

== Plot ==
The game stars Hikari Tsurugino, who is the sister of the protagonist from the original game.

== Development ==
The game is a sequel to Makeruna! Makendō (Kendo Rage).

== Gameplay ==
Makeruna! Makendō 2 is a 2D fighting game featuring magical attacks. The game features RPG elements, where the character can level up, and on the higher level, the more kinds of attacks the player has.

It plays similarly to other 2D versus fighting games, in which the player's character fights against their opponent in a best of two-out-of-three matches in a single player tournament mode with the computer, or against another human player. In the original Super Famicom version, the gameplay has a traditional combo system. In the PlayStation version, the combo system and speed were increased.

== Release ==
The game was released on March 17, 1995 for the Super Famicom in Japan. It was released on November 10 the same year for the PlayStation. The port was handled by Fill-in-Cafe.

The PlayStation version was later re-released for the PlayStation Network in 2010. It was released for PSN Imports for outside of Japan in by Gungho America. It was released simultaneously with Art Camion Sugorokuden, Finger Flashing, Lup Salad, Vehicle Cavalier and Zanac x Zanac. It retailed for US$5.99.

== Reception ==
On release, Famitsu magazine scored the Super Famicom version of the game a 21 out of 40. Famitsu rated the PlayStation version 20 out of 40.
