= Mad Stalker: Full Metal Forth =

1994 video game

- Developer: Fill-in-Cafe
- Publisher: Family Soft
- Director: Masaya Konya
- Producer: Sōichirō Miyakawa
- Designers: Masaki Ukyo; Masatoshi Imaizumi
- Programmer: Takumi Amano
- Composer: Keishi Yonao
- Platforms: FM Towns, Windows, PC Engine Arcade CD-ROM², PlayStation, Mega Drive, X68000
- Release: 1994: X68000; JP: 14 January 1994 FM Towns; JP: 1 July 1994 PC Engine Arcade CD-ROM²; JP: 15 September 1994 Windows; JP: 21 February 2004 Mega Drive; JP: 17 September 2020
- Genre: Beat 'em up
- Modes: Single-player, multiplayer

Mad Stalker: Full Metal Forth (Note: Japanese: マッド ストーカー: フル メタル フォース, Hepburn: Maddo Sutōkā: Furu Metaru Fōsu; also known as Mad Stalker: Full Metal Force.) is a 1994 side-scrolling beat 'em up game developed by Fill-in-Cafe and published by Family Soft in Japan for the X68000. It is the fourth game to be created and released by both Fill-in-Cafe and Family Soft for the X68000 platform late into its commercial life span, after being discontinued in 1993.

Though it was initially launched for the X68000, Mad Stalker: Full Metal Forth was later ported to other home computers and consoles such as the FM Towns and PC Engine Arcade CD-ROM², with each one exhibiting several changes and additions compared to the original incarnation, while all versions of the game are Japanese-exclusive. In 1997, the title was substantially remade for the PlayStation. Both the X68000 and PlayStation versions have since been re-released through download services such as Microsoft Windows and PlayStation Network respectively. A conversion for the Mega Drive was in development and previewed, but it did not receive an official release to the public until Columbus Circle published it in September 2020.

Despite its late initial launch, Mad Stalker: Full Metal Forth received positive reception from critics who praised multiple aspects such as the graphics, sound design and gameplay, becoming a relatively popular title among the X68000 userbase from Fill-in-Cafe that would lead it in being nominated for a Game of the Year award by Japanese magazine Oh!X before ultimately losing against other titles on the system.

== Gameplay ==
Gameplay screenshot from the original Sharp X68000 version.

Mad Stalker: Full Metal Forth is a side-scrolling beat 'em up game reminiscent of Kung-Fu Master and The Ninja Warriors, where players assume the role of a policeman taking control of a SlaveGear mecha suit known as Hound Dog through six stages of varying themes set in Artemis City in an effort to defeat a rogue SlaveGear model called Rising Dog, stop a rogue artificial intelligence named Omega, who has become rogue against humankind and destroy its army of robot enemies as the main objective. Prior to starting a playthrough, players have the choice of accessing the options menu at the title screen, where various settings can be adjusted such as controls and any of the three difficulty levels.

The game is played in a single plane field and all of the levels featured are linear in nature, where the player can go either left or right by controlling Hound Dog with an eight-directional joystick and two attack buttons, of which they differ in terms of strength and speed. Players use the joystick to jump, double jump, crouch and move their player character towards or away from enemies. Similar to Street Fighter II and other fighting games of the era, players can perform a variety of basic moves in any position, including grabbing/throwing attacks, while special moves are performed by inputting a combination of directional and button-based commands. Players can also execute a dash attack that can be cancelled by guarding enemy hits.

After defeating minor enemies and reaching the end of the stage, a boss must be fought in order to progress further through. If the Hound Dog sustaints too much consecutive damage, players will be rendered dizzy and left vulnerable for more incoming enemy attacks and if the health bar of the Hound Dog becomes empty, it will explode and the game is over as a result, though players has a chance of continuing where he or she left off by selecting the continue option at the title screen. In addition to the single-player campaign, the game also includes a versus mode where two human opponents face against each other with the mecha of their choice in one-on-one matches until the fighter who manages to deplete the health bar of the opponent before the timer runs out wins the bout and becomes the winner of the match, while a single human player can also fight against a computer-controlled opponent as well.

== Plot ==
The plot summary of Mad Stalker: Full Metal Forth varies between each version. The game takes place in a post-war setting in the year 2142, where a warship built during the last moments of the war was discovered by the military, which contained several hundred mecha robots known as SlaveGears. These units were put under control of the current ruling government for power purposes, two of which are placed under police management for experimental use and given the names of "Hound Dog" and "Rising Dog" respectively. However the on-board computer at the unearthed warship, "Omega", suddenly becomes operational and accesses the military networks, freezing Artemis City and commanding Rising Dog on exterminating his enemies. The research facility is obliterated and Rising Dog manages to escape into the city, leading the police to recognize the emergency and ultimately deploy a SOS signal to Hound Dog in order to protect the city by destroying all enemy robots.

== Development ==
Mad Stalker: Full Metal Forth served as the fourth title to be developed by Fill-in-Cafe for the Sharp X68000 after PitaPat and its creation was helmed by a small team at the company with producer Sōichirō Miyakawa, while Masaya Konya served as its director. Both Masaki Ukyo and Masatoshi Imaizumi shared multiple development duties during the project such as not only being artists and designers, but also programmers alongside Takumi Amano. Umihara Kawase illustrator Toshinobu Kondo was also involved in the production of the project as an advisor. Kondo stated that the team desired to develop a title featuring robots of their own, as members within the company were fans of the mecha genre with anime series such as Gundam and Zoom's 1989 Genocide proved to be a source of inspiration for them. The music for Mad Stalker: Full Metal Forth was composed by Keishi Yonao. In a 2015 interview with website Video Game Music Online, Yonao recalled the process to compose the game's soundtrack, stating that the American band Earth, Wind & Fire and Sega's 1988 Galaxy Force were his main sources of inspirations for the funk-styled compositions.

== Release ==
Mad Stalker: Full Metal Forth was first published by Family Soft for the Sharp X68000 in Japan on 14 January 1994, late into the commercial life span of the computer and a year after being discontinued in 1993 by Sharp Corporation with the last model launched, retailing for JP¥7,800. Since its initial release, the game has been ported to various platforms, with each one featuring several changes and additions compared to the original release, although the title was changed to Mad Stalker: Full Metal Force instead. In order to promote both the X68000 and FM Towns versions, a mini manga series with artwork by Tatsumi Minegishi was created and featured across various Japanese publications such as Micom BASIC Magazine. On 24 September 1994, Yonao composed an album titled Mad Stalker 2142 (Note: マッドストーカー２１４２ (Maddo Sutōkā 2142)) that was published by Polydor Records exclusively in Japan, with most of the songs featured being unique to this album, though some were used in the PlayStation remake three years later. On 18 December 2006, the original X68000 soundtrack was exclusively released by D4 Enterprise on their Project EGG service for download in MP3 format. The original X68000 version has since been re-released in digital form for Microsoft Windows through D4 Enterprise's Project EGG service on 21 February 2004.

In July 1994, Mad Stalker: Full Metal Forth was ported to the Fujitsu FM Towns home computer under the title Mad Stalker: Full Metal Force, featuring an arranged Redbook CD Audio soundtrack based upon the original FM chiptune background music, as well as redrawn visuals, among other changes but it follows the X68000 version closely. Like other titles released for the platform, this version can also be played on the FM Towns Marty. On 15 September 1994, the game received a substantially reprogrammed conversion by Kogado Studio for the PC Engine Arcade CD-ROM² and was published by NEC Interchannel. This version of the game shares mostly the same visual design as with the FM Towns release but with the addition of several new features such as exclusive animated cutscenes, two additional characters that have their own strengths and weaknesses in single-player, as well as Redbook CD Audio.

On 3 July 1997, Fill-in-Cafe developed a completely different version of Mad Stalker: Full Metal Force that was published and distributed by Family Soft for the PlayStation. Though similar to the previous releases in terms of gameplay, the remake is now presented with pseudo-3D visuals instead of the original hand-drawn look, redrawn sprites, a rearranged soundtrack, among other changes to take advantage of the PlayStation's more powerful hardware. The remake also follows the original plot, in addition to the extra playable characters on the single-player campaign that were first introduced in the PC Engine version, although they must be unlocked by entering cheat codes at the title screen, in addition to support for the memory card that allows the player to save their progress and setting changes. However, some fans of the game have deemed this version to be inferior compared to the other releases due to the slower gameplay (on default settings), visuals, presentation and locked content. The PlayStation remake was later ported to the PlayStation Network on 12 January 2011.

A Sega Mega Drive version of Mad Stalker: Full Metal Forth was announced in late 1993 to be under development by Kogado Studio. It was later previewed through multiple screenshots in late 1993 on video game magazines such as Beep! Mega Drive and Marukatsu Mega Drive, but the Mega Drive port did not receive an official launch to the public due to cartridge manufacturing costs until it was released by independent publisher Columbus Circle on 17 September 2020.

== Reception ==
Reception

Review scores
Publication	Score
Famitsu	(PCE) 5/10, 7/10, 4/10, 5/10 (PS) 20/40
Dengeki PC Engine	(PCE) 65/100, 80/100, 80/100, 70/100
Dengeki PlayStation	(PS) 55/100, 45/100
Oh!X	(X68000) 7/10

Award
Publication	Award
Oh!X (1994)	#5 1994年度Oh!X Game of the Year (X68000)

Mad Stalker: Full Metal Forth received positive reception from reviewers and players alike since its initial release on the X68000. Taki Yasushi of Oh!X praised several aspects such as the graphics, sound design and gameplay. It became a relatively popular title from Fill-in-Cafe among users of the X68000 that would eventually lead it in being nominated for a "Game of the Year" award by Oh!X before ultimately losing against other titles on the system like Garō Densetsu Special and Super Street Fighter II: The New Challengers. Animerica gave the PC Engine Arcade CD-ROM² version a positive outlook.

In a retrospective review of the PC Engine version, Laurent Kermel of Video Game Den gave positive comments in regards to the graphics, large sprites and mecha designs, however he criticized the controls for being uncomfortable and repetitive setpieces but ultimately deemed the title to be better than Genocide on the system.

== Legacy ==
According to former Treasure designer Tetsuhiko Kikuchi in a November 2012 issue of Nintendo Power, Mad Stalker: Full Metal Forth and Alien vs. Predator by Capcom were the main inspirations for the design of Guardian Heroes on Sega Saturn. In recent years, animation cels of the PlayStation cutscenes were sold on Mandarake between 2015 and 2017. In May 2019, Masatoshi Imaizumi revealed to Yosuke Okunari of Sega on Twitter that a sequel to Mad Stalker: Full Metal Forth was started but cancelled. Retronauts also noted the game to be an influence for Phantom Breaker.
