= Phantom Breaker =

2011 video game

- Developer: 5pb. (Note: Co-developed with Delta Factory and R.U.N. Phantom Breaker: Omnia co-developed with GameLoop): exA-Arcadia (Arcade Omnia)
- Publishers: 5pb.; Rocket Panda Games (Omnia); exA-Arcadia (Arcade Omnia)
- Designers: Masatoshi Imaizumi; Masaki Ukyo
- Artist: Hiro Suzuhira
- Composer: Takeshi Abo
- Series: Phantom Breaker
- Platforms: Xbox 360; Arcade; PlayStation 3; Microsoft Windows; Nintendo Switch; PlayStation 4; Xbox One
- Release: JP: June 2, 2011; Another Code: JP: April 4, 2013; Extra: JP: September 19, 2013; Omnia: WW: March 15, 2022; Arcade Omnia: WW: July, 2024
- Genre: Fighting
- Modes: Single-player, multiplayer
- Arcade system: Sega RingEdge 2, exA-Arcadia

Phantom Breaker (Note: ファントムブレイカー (Fantomu Bureikā)) is a 2011 fighting video game developed and published by 5pb. for the Xbox 360. An arcade version running on Sega's RingEdge 2 arcade board, subtitled Another Code, was released in April 2013. In addition, an enhanced edition, subtitled, Extra, was released for the PlayStation 3 and Xbox 360 in September 2013. A beat 'em up spin-off, Phantom Breaker: Battle Grounds, was released via Xbox Live Arcade. The latest update, subtitled Omnia, was released worldwide (and for the first time outside Japan) in March 2022 for PlayStation 4, Xbox One, Nintendo Switch and PC via Steam by Rocket Panda Games. An arcade version of Omnia was released in 2024 developed by exA-Arcadia.

In 2022, Rocket Panda Games acquired the series intellectual property from MAGES.

== Gameplay ==
Phantom Breaker is a 2D fighting game that supports two distinctive fighting styles, the player is able to choose between "Quick" style and "Hard" style. Quick style focuses on quick hits and combos while the other is more about defense.

When the player reaches "Overdrive" mode, their character might get an extra increase in speed or defense. Every attack the player releases can cancel out their enemy's attack and raise their tension gauge; timing it right will maximise the player's gauge to boost their attack power.

== Plot ==
The game's setting takes place in Japan. A mystery organization led by Phantom organized a fighting tournament in Tokyo called Phantom Duel, whose winner will have their wish granted. Players start with the protagonist, Mikoto Nishina, but can choose from different duelists who have various desires for a wish when competing in the competition. Duelists equip weapons called F.A. (Fu-mension Artifacts) to fight each other.

As the player progresses through the game, it is revealed that the Phantom's true goal in organizing the competition is to gain his lost powers back by creating cracks in the multiverse using the energy generated by the clash of weapons used in the duels.

Players can choose Story Mode for each character to learn more about their motivations and learn more about the Phantom's secret plan to ultimately defeat him.

== Characters ==
Before the release of Phantom Breaker: Omnia, the game had a total of 18 playable characters. An additional "female gang member" character was planned, but never made it into the final game.

- Mikoto Nishina (仁科 美琴, Nishina Mikoto): A 19-year-old college violinist. Her weapon is a large, two-handed sword named Maestro.
- Mei Orisaka (折坂 芽衣, Orisaka Mei): A 14-year-old idol. Her weapon is a magical wand called Candy.
- Yuzuha Fujibayashi (藤林 柚葉, Fujibayashi Yuzuha): A high school girl, who is also a ninja-in-training from the Bakufu era. Her weapons are Shoukaku and Zuikaku — a ninja blade and a kunai.
- Waka Kumon (九紋 稚, Kumon Waka): A descendant of the miko (a family of exorcists that have had some dealings with Phantom in the past). She fights with Kahoutou, her naginata, to stop the duels.
- Ren Tatewaki (帯刀 蓮, Tatewaki Ren): One of the few males in this contest. He is fighting to cure his little sister of an incurable disease. He fights with a gauntlet named Koutarou.
- M (影霧, Eimu): She has no memories and fights only to satisfy her lust for battles. Her weapon of choice is a mace made of scrap materials, named Humongous.
- Itsuki Kōno (神埜 唯月, Kōno Itsuki): She does not know much of the world and has a gentle personality but a strong sense of justice. She beats opponents over the head with her battle hammer, Maggie.
- Ria Tōjō (東條 莉亜, Tōjō Ria): She finds out that one of the other combatants in Phantom Breaker killed her mother, and she is on a quest for revenge. She fights with two blades called Aldina.
- Tokiya Kanzaki (神崎 刻夜, Kanzaki Tokiya): The other male main character in this game. He is the CEO of a pharmaceutical company and he is fighting in order to resurrect his parents, who were assassinated fifteen years ago. He uses a long sword named Setsuna.
- Cocoa (心愛, Kokoa): She got bored with the real world and modified her body into an idealized version, based on a video game she liked. Her occupation is cosplaying. She fights with a giant claw called Kusenia's Claw.
- Fin (フィン, Fin): A 9-year-old time traveler from the future who is part of the organization "Schrodinger". She is accompanied by a droid named Mauchuu. Her weapons are all-purpose laser guns named JJ Apple.
- Infinity (インフィニティ, Infiniti): He is not one of the main characters but the bodyguard to the mysterious Phantom. He fights using telekinesis.
- Sophia Karganova (ソフィア・カルガノワ, Sophia.Karuganowa): A new character added in Phantom Breaker: Extra. Sophia is a Fu-mantion Artifact made by the Russian Science Academy that despises Phantom.
- Shizuka Saejima (冴嶋 閑, Saejima Shizuka): A new character added in Phantom Breaker: Extra. A former senior official that worked for Phantom who wants to bring Japan back to its militarism dogma.
- Ende (エンデ, Ende): A new character added in Phantom Breaker: Extra. Ende is from the Schrödinger Space-Time patrol group and brings a giant robot named Nataku into battle.
- Gaito & Rin (ガイト & リン, Gaito & Rin): Two new characters added in Phantom Breaker: Extra. Gaito & Rin are a team, but Rin, a 6-year-old girl, controls Gaito, an anti-soul that is brimming with power.
- Rimi Sakihata (咲畑 梨深, Sakihata Rimi): Guest character from Chaos;Head. She is a Gigalomaniac who can turn her delusions into reality. She wields a DI-sword.
- Kurisu Makise (牧瀬 紅莉栖, Makise Kurisu): Guest character from Steins;Gate. She is a genius who graduated early from an American university and helps out in a circle that develops strange inventions. She uses these strange inventions in gameplay.

== Release ==
Phantom Breaker was initially slated to be launched in April 2011, but was delayed and released in June 2011 in Japan. The game had been announced for a first quarter 2012 North American release by 7Sixty (a subsidiary of SouthPeak Games) but the release has since been cancelled for unknown reasons. As a result, the original Phantom Breaker was never commercially released outside Japan, although English-localized builds from 7Sixty have since surfaced online.

=== Phantom Breaker: Another Code ===
An arcade version of the game running on the RingEdge 2 board titled Phantom Breaker: Another Code (ファントムブレイカー アナザーコード, Fantomu Bureikā: Anazā Codo) was released on April 4, 2013. Version 1.1 was released in June 2013. This version adds Infinity, the game's final boss, as a playable character, rebalanced gameplay, and a new opening movie.

=== Phantom Breaker: Battle Grounds ===
In February 2013, 5pb released a beat 'em up spin-off, for Xbox 360 via XBLA called Phantom Breaker: Battle Grounds (ファントムブレイカー バトルグラウンド), with later releases to other platforms.

=== Phantom Breaker: Extra ===
In May 2013, 5pb. announced a new updated version of Phantom Breaker titled Phantom Breaker: Extra (ファントムブレイカー:エクストラ) which was released for the PlayStation 3 and Xbox 360 on September 19, 2013. It features rebalanced gameplay, new characters, new techniques, a new "Extra" fighting style, new stages, renewed background effects, and an online spectator mode.

=== Phantom Breaker: Omnia ===
In 2020, the company Rocket Panda Games announced that it will publish the updated version of the game called Phantom Breaker: Omnia for PlayStation 4, Xbox One, Nintendo Switch and PC. It features all the fighters from Phantom Breaker: Extra in addition to two new characters, a remixed soundtrack, a new fighting style called "Omnia", balance adjustments, and the ability to play though stories of both the original game and Phantom Breaker: Extra. This is first time the game will see a release outside of Japan and feature both Japanese and English voice acting. The game was released on March 15, 2022. An arcade version of Phantom Breaker: Omnia was released in 2024 by exA-Arcadia.

== Reception ==
Phantom Breaker received limited coverage due to its Japan-only Xbox 360 release, with import reviewers noting the mechanics but criticizing the story and character depth against established fighter games like BlazBlue. Phantom Breaker received generally negative reviews from critics. Jason Venter of GameSpot gave the game a score of 4.5/10, saying, "Phantom Breaker fights a losing battle to provide you with a reason to play it instead of one of its many qualified peers." Dracula's Cave called the 2013 Extra update a solid import despite similarities to peers, praising its combo potential.

=== Phantom Breaker: Omnia ===
Reception

Aggregate score
Aggregator	Score
Metacritic	PS4: 68/100; NS: 66/100; XONE: 69/100

Review scores
Publication	Score
Destructoid	7.5/10
Shacknews	7/10

Phantom Breaker: Omnia received "mixed or average" reviews according to review aggregator platform Metacritic. Reviewers highlighted its engaging localization and eye-catching anime visuals, though criticized generic designs and brief narratives.
