= Beats of Rage =

2003 video game

- Developer: Senile Team
- Platform: Microsoft Windows
- Release: November 2003
- Genre: Beat 'em up
- Mode: Single-player

Beats of Rage is a fan-made beat 'em up tribute game to Sega's Streets of Rage series. It supplants the original graphics and characters with resources taken from The King of Fighters series, albeit with tongue-in-cheek renames. Originally developed by Senile Team, the underlying engine powering Beats of Rage later went on to become the Open Beats of Rage (OpenBOR) game engine project.

== Gameplay ==
Players take control of Max Bacon, Mandy Bluegard, or Kula Gem to defeat the forces of Mr. Y, who has taken over an unnamed city. Per the opening text:

It has been three months since his escape. But in this time Mr. Y has brought the city into turmoil. He has taken control of the city's government and corrupted its police force. No one is safe and thugs and villains rule the streets. But three young friends take a stand for justice. Their names are Kula Gem, Max Bacon, and Mandy Bluegard. No longer can they tolerate crime, violence and injustice. So they go out into the streets to deliver some... Beats of Rage.

Beats of Rage supports two-player cooperation and a pseudo-3D field. In-game characters always face left or right but are capable of three-axis movement. Player characters are mechanically similar, sharing the same techniques and fighting abilities. Other than visual appearance, only slight differences in movement speed and starting hit points distinguish them. Each may execute a four-hit combination attack, a jump attack that knocks down enemies, and a second jump attack that only stuns. By walking into an opponent without attacking or getting hit, the player character will initiate a grapple, allowing execution of up to three hold attacks or a throw. Players are also equipped with two "special" attacks. The first has a considerably risky execution time, but knocks enemies down and boasts a longer range than most other techniques. The second is an all directional attack that is invincible while active and usable even when grabbed or hit, but consumes (and requires) a small portion of the player's hit points. Enemy characters attack the player with a variety of abilities - typically a lesser mix of the player's own array of techniques. Each stage is punctuated with a stronger "boss" enemy. When the boss is defeated, a stage is complete and the next stage begins.

== Development and release ==
According to team leader Roel van Mastbergen, Senile Team spent approximately nine months developing Beats of Rage, with an initial release in November 2003. Although Senile Team members made no active attempt to advertise the game, news spread by word of mouth. The game was quickly ported to other systems, resulting in a popularity increase sufficient to take down mirror hosts such as Dreamcast-Scene within 24 hours. By 2006 more than a million copies of the game were downloaded. On the unexpected popularity, team member Jeroen remarked, "...you should know that we just made it for fun. We never thought that more than 10 people would ever play it." Later ports brought Beats of Rage to the Dreamcast, PlayStation 2, Wii and PlayStation Portable platforms. Additionally, Beats of Rage received significant mainstream media attention, being highlighted in gaming magazine G4. The game was also featured in printed media such as XboxGamer.

=== Age of the Beast ===
In 2006 Senile team announced a spiritual successor to Beats of Rage entitled Age of the Beast. Set in a high fantasy world of sword and sorcery, it was according to team members "going to smash Beats of Rage into a bloody pulp". However, after the initial preview Senile Team released no further information until Age of the Beast was removed from the team's project list in 2017. As part of another release (Rush Rush Rally Racing), an announcement briefly appeared in the team blog stating development costs and time budget to complete Age of the Beast were insurmountable. "First I have to get one thing out of the way, though: it's not Age of the Beast. In case you didn't know, Age of the Beast was a project we started soon after the release of our firstborn, the moddable beat 'em up engine called Beats of Rage. But we stepped into the same traps as so many other indie developers - we announced it prematurely and watched it grow over our heads. I suppose this is a natural part of growing up for a game developer. It has certainly taught us a lot."

== Open Beats of Rage ==
Open Beats of Rage is an open source continuation of the Beats of Rage engine. Although Beats of Rage was intended to be a stand-alone game, the modular design of in game elements and engine meant end users were able to replace assets with creations of their own, called mods. For instance, it is possible to swap the character Kula Gem with another King of Fighters entity such as Terry Bogard. With a bit of work, the engine allowed building entirely new games. Seeing the potential in such an application, developer kirby2000 obtained source code and licensing permission from Senile Team to continue development. The new project was renamed OpenBOR.

OpenBOR development centered around a loose coalition of individuals until 2006 when SumoIX joined the community and reorganized code work into a group now known as the OpenBOR Team. SumoIX retired from OpenBOR development in 2011, turning project lead duties over to Damon "DC" Caskey. DC migrated development from SourceForge to GitHub in April 2017, with engine development and an active module making community continuing to the present day.

Compared to the predecessor it was built from, OpenBOR eliminates the various numerical limitations, provides a high definition graphic suite, adds far more gameplay options, and includes an extendable C based scripting engine that allows authors to modify, add to, or outright replace default engine functionality. It is often advertised as "The ultimate 2D engine" and "the most powerful 2D sprite based engine in the world". OpenBOR is royalty-free and its licensing model allows authors to create commercial games, although authors are asked to mention the engine as part of a splash screen or in some similar manner.

Due to efforts towards backward compatibility, most modules intended for the Beats of Rage engine will play on OpenBOR. However, the enemy characters will exhibit far more difficult and aggressive behavior.

=== OpenBOR EXA ===
In 2021, exA-Arcadia ported OpenBOR to their arcade platform. In order to use it for arcades, exA-Arcadia re-factored the engine to use hardware rendering instead of the software rendering of the original version. New features that were not possible before have been added: 8 player support, handling of coins & credits, multiple language support, new HUD features, high score saving with names, new scanline logic, and 1 frame input latency. This version of the tool is only available for exA-Arcadia developers.
