= List of Evercade games =

At launch on 20 May 2020, Blaze Entertainment's Evercade handheld console had 10 game cartridges available, providing a total of 122 games. Physical cartridges and cases feature color-coded artwork and numbering correlating to which collection the cartridge is part of: console, arcade, or home computer. Cartridges that are no longer in production, mainly due to limits on licensing agreements, are referred to as "Legacy" cartridges. As of June 2026, nineteen cartridges had entered Legacy status (Console #1, #2, #5 #6, #9, #10, #12, #13, #14, #16, #17, #19, #20, #21, #26 and #30 as well as Arcade #1, #4 and #7). While Piko Interactive Collection 1 (Console #9) returned to production status in 28 August 2026, the game Magic Girl has been omitted from the re-released version. In addition to those available on cartridge, hidden games are unlockable through several methods. One such method is to insert certain combinations of cartridges into the Evercade VS at the same time.

In April 2024, Blaze unveiled their new Giga Carts. The cartridges are identical in appearance to regular cartridges, other than the addition of a small Giga Cart logo on the label, but have a larger storage capacity. The larger capacity would allow for larger game files to be stored on the cartridge, particularly games originally released on CD. The larger capacity also necessitated a price increase for cartridges in the new format. The first Giga Cart was announced as Tomb Raider Collection 1 which would be sold individually and bundled with the Evercade EXP-R and VS-R which were announced at the same time. Tomb Raider Collection 1 was announced as a summer 2024 release. The Super Pocket, a handheld console produced by Blaze affiliate HyperMegaTech!, is compatible with all Evercade cartridges.

== Cartridges ==
The following is a list of cartridges released for the Evercade family of consoles, including the original Evercade handheld (referred to as OG), EXP and EXP-R, the Evercade VS, the VS-R and the Evercade Alpha bartop arcade machines. Please click on each arrow in the header row to sort by other categories.

=== Total cartridges ===
As of 25 September 2026

Cartridges in total
Console	Cartridges	Games
Console	54	459
Arcade	Cartridges	Games
Arcade	24	190
Home computer	Cartridges	Games
Home computer	12	123
Total	Cartridges	Games
Total	90	772

=== Console ===
Evercade console cartridge list
Cartridge #	Title	Legacy	# of games	Games included	Release date
01	Atari Collection 1	Yes	20	Atari 2600: Adventure; Aquaventure; Asteroids; Canyon Bomber; Centipede; Crystal Castles; Desert Falcon; Double Dunk; Gravitar; Missile Command; Night Driver; Steeplechase; Swordquest Earthworld; Tempest; Video Pinball; Yars' Return; Atari 7800: Alien Brigade; Food Fight; Motor Psycho; Ninja Golf	20 May 2020 (launch)
02	Namco Museum Collection 1	Yes	11	Battle Cars (SNES); Dig Dug (NES); Galaxian (NES); Libble Rabble (SNES); Mappy (NES); Mappy Kids (NES); Metal Marines (SNES); Pac-Man (NES); Quad Challenge (Genesis); Star Luster (NES); Xevious (NES)	20 May 2020 (launch)
03	Data East Collection 1	No	10	Bad Dudes (NES); Bump 'n' Jump (NES); BurgerTime (NES); Fighter's History (SNES); Joe & Mac 2: Lost in the Tropics (SNES); Karate Champ (NES); Magical Drop II (SNES); Midnight Resistance (Genesis); Side Pocket (SNES); Two Crude Dudes (Genesis)	20 May 2020 (launch)
04	Interplay Collection 1	No	6	Battle Chess (NES); Boogerman: A Pick and Flick Adventure (SNES); ClayFighter (SNES); Earthworm Jim (Genesis); Incantation (SNES); Titan (NES)	20 May 2020 (launch)
05	Atari Collection 2	Yes	20	Atari 2600: Air-Sea Battle; Bowling; Dark Chambers; Demons to Diamonds; Haunted House; Human Cannonball; Millipede; Radar Lock; RealSports Tennis; Solaris; Sprintmaster; Street Racer; Submarine Commander; Wizard; Yars' Revenge; Atari 7800: Asteroids; Basketbrawl; Centipede; Desert Falcon; Planet Smashers	20 May 2020 (launch)
06	Namco Museum Collection 2	Yes	11	Burning Force (Genesis); Dragon Spirit: The New Legend (NES); Dig Dug II (NES); Galaga (NES); Pac-Attack (SNES); Phelios (Genesis); Splatterhouse 2 (Genesis); Splatterhouse 3 (Genesis); The Tower of Druaga (NES); Warpman (NES); WeaponLord (SNES)	20 May 2020 (launch)
07	Interplay Collection 2	No	6	The Adventures of Rad Gravity (NES); The Brainies (SNES); ClayFighter 2: Judgment Clay (SNES); Claymates (SNES); Earthworm Jim 2 (SNES); Prehistorik Man (SNES)	20 May 2020 (launch)
08	Mega Cat Studios Collection 1	No	10	Almost Hero (NES); Coffee Crisis (Genesis); Creepy Brawlers (NES); Justice Duel (NES); Little Medusa (Genesis); Log Jammers (NES); Multidude (NES); Old Towers (Genesis); Super Painter (NES); Tänzer (Genesis)	20 May 2020 (launch)
09	Piko Interactive Collection 1	Yes	20	8 Eyes (NES); Brave Battle Saga: The Legend of the Magic Warrior (Genesis); Canon: Legends of the New Gods (Genesis); Dorke and Ymp (SNES); Dragon View (SNES); Drakkhen (SNES); The Humans (SNES); The Immortal (Genesis); Iron Commando (SNES); Jim Power: The Lost Dimension in 3-D (SNES); Magic Girl (Genesis) (Note: Omitted from the reissue.); Nightshade (NES); Power Piggs of the Dark Age (SNES); Power Punch II (NES); Radical Rex (Genesis); Switchblade (Genesis); Tinhead (Genesis); Top Racer (SNES); Water Margin: The Tales of Clouds and Winds (Genesis); The Way of the Exploding Fist (NES)	20 May 2020 (launch) 28 August 2026 (reissue)
10	Technōs Collection 1	Yes	8	Crash 'n' the Boys: Street Challenge (NES); Double Dragon (NES); Double Dragon II: The Revenge (NES); Renegade (NES); River City Ransom (NES); Super Dodge Ball (NES); Super Double Dragon (SNES); Super Spike V'Ball (NES)	20 May 2020 (launch)
11	Xeno Crisis & Tanglewood	No	2	Tanglewood; Xeno Crisis; Both games are the Genesis versions.	23 October 2020
12	The Oliver Twins Collection	Yes	11	Dizzy the Adventurer; Dreamworld Pogie; The Fantastic Adventures of Dizzy; FireHawk; Go! Dizzy! Go!; Mystery World Dizzy; Panic Dizzy; Professional BMX Simulator; Super Robin Hood; Treasure Island Dizzy; Wonderland Dizzy; All games are the NES versions.	23 October 2020
13	Atari Lynx Collection 1	Yes	17	Awesome Golf; Basketbrawl; Crystal Mines II: Buried Treasure; CyberVirus; Dracula the Undead; Gordo 106; Ishido: The Way of Stones; Jimmy Connors Tennis; Loopz; Malibu Bikini Volleyball; MegaPak Vol. 1; Power Factor; Remnant: Planar Wars 3D; Scrapyard Dog; Super Asteroids & Missile Command; Super Skweek; Xump: The Final Run	27 November 2020
14	Atari Lynx Collection 2	Yes	8	Blue Lightning; California Games; Checkered Flag; Chip's Challenge; Electrocop; Gates of Zendocon; Todd's Adventures in Slime World; Zarlor Mercenary	27 November 2020
15	Jaleco Collection 1	No	10	Astyanax (NES); Bases Loaded (NES); Brawl Brothers (SNES); City Connection (NES); The Ignition Factor (SNES); Operation Logic Bomb (SNES); Rival Turf! (SNES); Super E.D.F.: Earth Defense Force (SNES); Super Goal! 2 (SNES); Totally Rad (NES)	22 May 2021
16	Piko Interactive Collection 2	Yes	13	Beastball (Genesis); Eliminator Boat Duel (NES); Football Madness (PS1); Full Throttle: All-American Racing (SNES); Hoops Shut Up and Jam (Genesis); Hoops Shut Up and Jam 2 (Genesis); Power Football (Genesis); Racing Fever (GBA); Soccer Kid (SNES); Summer Challenge (Genesis); Top Racer 2 (SNES); Winter Challenge (Genesis); World Trophy Soccer (Genesis)	22 May 2021
17	Indie Heroes Collection 1	Yes	14	Alien Cat 2 (Genesis); Anguna: Warriors of Virtue (GBA); Chain Break (GB); Deadeus (GB); Debtor (Genesis); Doodle World (NES); Flea! (NES); FoxyLand (Genesis); Kubo 3 (NES); Ploid (NES); Quest Arrest (GBC); Super Homebrew War (NES); Twin Dragons (NES); Uchusen: Ultimate Ploid Battle (NES)	30 July 2021
18	Worms Collection 1	No	3	Worms (Genesis); Worms Armageddon (PS1); Worms Blast (GBA)	30 July 2021
19	Codemasters Collection 1	Yes	17	Bee 52 (NES); Big Nose Freaks Out (NES); Big Nose the Caveman (NES); Boomerang Kid (NES); Cannon Fodder (Genesis); CJ's Elephant Antics (NES); Cosmic Spacehead (Genesis); F-16 Renegade (NES); Linus Spacehead's Cosmic Crusade (NES); Mega-Lo-Mania (Genesis); MiG-29: Soviet Fighter (NES); Psycho Pinball (Genesis); Sensible Soccer (Genesis); Stunt Buggie (NES); Super Skidmarks (Genesis); Tennis All-Stars (Genesis); The Ultimate Stuntman (NES)	27 August 2021
20	Mega Cat Studios Collection 2	Yes	8	Alter Ego: DreamWalker (Genesis); Arkagis Revolution (Genesis); Devwill Too (Genesis); GLUF (Genesis); Misplaced (Genesis); Romeow & Julicat (Genesis); Roniu's Tale (NES); Yazzie (Genesis)	29 September 2021
21	Intellivision Collection 1	Yes	12	Astrosmash; Buzz Bombers; Frog Bog; Night Stalker; Pinball; Princess Quest; Shark! Shark!; Slap Shot: Super Pro Hockey; Snafu; Thin Ice; Thunder Castle; Word Rockets	8 December 2021
22	The Bitmap Brothers Collection 1	No	5	The Chaos Engine (SNES); Speedball (Master System); Speedball 2: Brutal Deluxe (Genesis); Speedball 2100 (PS1); Xenon 2: Megablast (Genesis)	8 December 2021
23	Renovation Collection 1	No	12	Arcus Odyssey; Beast Wrestler; Dino Land; El Viento; Exile; Final Zone; Gaiares; Granada; Sol-Deace; Traysia; Valis: The Fantasm Soldier; Valis III; All games are the Genesis versions.	31 March 2022
24	Gremlin Collection 1	No	6	Actua Soccer (PS1); Brain Bender (GB); Hardcore 4x4 (PS1); Premier Manager 97 (Genesis); Utopia: The Creation of a Nation (SNES); Zool (Genesis)	31 March 2022
25	Morphcat Games Collection 1	No	5	Böbl; Micro Mages; Micro Mages Second Quest; Spacegulls; Super Bat Puncher (Demo); All games are the NES versions.	29 June 2022
26	Intellivision Collection 2	Yes	12	Auto Racing; Cloudy Mountain; Hover Force; Motocross; Mountain Madness: Super Pro Skiing; Reversi; Sharp Shot; Stadium Mud Buggies; Star Strike; Super Pro Decathlon; Tower of Doom; Vectron	29 June 2022
27	Alwa's Awakening & Cathedral	No	2	Alwa's Awakening: The 8-bit Edition (NES); Cathedral (native port)	4 November 2022
28	Indie Heroes Collection 2	No	12	Anguna: Scourge of the Goblin King (NES); Beer Slinger (NES); The Cowlitz Gamers Adventure Trilogy (NES); Eyra, the Crow Maiden (Genesis); Gelatinous: Humanity Lost (GB); The Gruniożerca Trilogy (NES); Lunar Journey (GB); Nessy the Robot (NES); Nix: The Paradox Relic (NES); Reknum Souls Adventure (NES); Tapeworm Disco Puzzle (NES); Yeah Yeah Beebiss II (NES)	31 January 2023
29	Piko Interactive Collection 3	No	10	40 Winks (PS1); Legend of Wukong (Genesis); Metal Mech: Man & Machine (NES); Motor City Patrol (NES); Punch King (GBA); Radikal Bikers (GBC); Stanley: The Search for Dr. Livingston (NES); Super Bubble Pop (GBA); Sword of Sodan (Genesis); Zero Tolerance (Genesis)	31 May 2023
30	The Sydney Hunter Collection	Yes	4	Jester (NES); Sydney Hunter and the Caverns of Death (SNES); Sydney Hunter and the Sacred Tribe (Master System); Sydney Hunter and the Shrines of Peril (Intellivision)	11 August 2023
31	Sunsoft Collection 1	No	6	Aero the Acro-Bat (SNES); Arabian (NES); Blaster Master (NES); Blaster Master Boy (GB); Journey to Silius (NES); Mr. Gimmick (NES)	28 September 2023
32	Full Void	No	1	Full Void	14 November 2023
33	Duke Nukem Collection 1	No	3	Duke Nukem I & II Remastered (native port); Duke Nukem 3D: Total Meltdown (PS1)	28 November 2023
34	Duke Nukem Collection 2	No	3	Duke Nukem Advance (GBA); Duke Nukem: Land of the Babes (PS1); Duke Nukem: Time to Kill (PS1)	28 November 2023
35	Goodboy Galaxy & Witch n' Wiz	No	2	Goodboy Galaxy (GBA); Witch n' Wiz (NES)	28 November 2023
36	Demons of Asteborg & Astebros	No	2	Astebros; Demons of Asteborg; Both games are the Genesis versions.	28 November 2023
37	Indie Heroes Collection 3	No	13	Alien Cat 2: Enhanced Edition (SNES); Big2Small (GBC); Bone Marrow (Genesis); Bubble Seahorse Adventures (native port); Chew Chew Mimic (NES); Chibi Monster Br4wl (NES); Donut Dodo (native port); Doodle World Redrawn (NES); The Little Tales of Alexandria (GB); Magic and Legend: Time Knights (GBC); Orebody: Binder's Tale (NES); Skate Cat (NES); Thunder Paw (Genesis)	29 February 2024
38	Sunsoft Collection 2	No	7	Aero the Acro-Bat 2 (Genesis); Blaster Master: Enemy Below (GBC); Daze Before Christmas (SNES); Galaxy Fight: Universal Warriors (PS1); Pri Pri: Primitive Princess! (GB); Ufouria: The Saga (NES); Zero the Kamikaze Squirrel (SNES)	30 April 2024
39	Piko Interactive Collection 4	No	10	Bad Street Brawler (NES); The Fidgetts (GB); Glover (N64); Mermaids of Atlantis: Riddle of the Magic Bubble (NES); Risky Woods (Genesis); Sküljagger: Revolt of the Westicans (SNES); Star X (GBA); Street Racer (SNES); Target: Renegade (NES); Zero Tolerance Underground (Genesis)	30 April 2024
40	Tomb Raider Collection 1	No	3	Tomb Raider; Tomb Raider II Starring Lara Croft; Tomb Raider III: Adventures of Lara Croft; All games are the PS1 versions.	31 July 2024
41	Legacy of Kain Collection	No	2	Blood Omen: Legacy of Kain; Legacy of Kain: Soul Reaver; Both games are the PS1 versions.	30 September 2024
42	Metal Dragon & Life on Mars	No	2	Life on Mars; Metal Dragon; Both games are the Genesis versions.	12 December 2024
43	Indie Heroes Collection 4	No	11	Batty Zabella (GB); Block Droppin' (GBC); Block'em Sock'em (Genesis); Collie Defense (GBA); The Curse of Illmoore Bay (Genesis); Flea!2 (NES); Jane Austen's 8-bit Adventure (NES); Murtop (native port); Nyghtmare - The Ninth King (GBC); Soko Banana (NES); Starseed (GBC)	10 March 2025
44	Broken Sword Collection	No	2	Broken Sword: The Shadow of the Templars; Broken Sword II: The Smoking Mirror; Both games are the PS1 versions.	10 March 2025
45	Tomb Raider Collection 2	No	2	Tomb Raider: Chronicles; Tomb Raider: The Last Revelation; Both games are the PS1 versions.	25 April 2025
46	Gremlin Collection 2	No	4	Buggy; Hogs of War; Loaded; Re-Loaded; All games are the PS1 versions.	10 July 2025
47	Activision Collection 1	No	15	Beamrider; Crackpots; Demon Attack; Enduro; Fishing Derby; Freeway; Grand Prix; Megamania; Pitfall!; Private Eye; River Raid; Sky Jinks; Space Shuttle: A Journey into Space; Starmaster; Tennis; All games are the Atari 2600 versions.	30 November 2025
48	Rare Collection 1	No	12	Atic Atac (ZX Spectrum); Battletoads (arcade); Battletoads (NES); Cobra Triangle (NES); Conker's Pocket Tales (GBC); Gunfright (ZX Spectrum); Jetpac (ZX Spectrum); Knight Lore (ZX Spectrum); Lunar Jetman (ZX Spectrum); R.C. Pro-Am (NES); Sabre Wulf (ZX Spectrum); Underwurlde (C64)	30 November 2025
49	The Turrican Collection	No	10	Mega Turrican (Genesis); Mega Turrican: Director's Cut (Genesis); Mega Turrican: Score Attack (Genesis); Super Turrican (SNES); Super Turrican 2 (SNES); Super Turrican: Director's Cut (SNES); Super Turrican: Score Attack (SNES); Turrican (Amiga); Turrican II: The Final Fight (Amiga); Turrican 3: Payment Day (Amiga)	27 February 2026
50	Activision Collection 2	No	15	Boxing; Checkers; Cosmic Commuter; Dragster; H.E.R.O.; Moonsweeper; Oink!; Pitfall II: Lost Caverns; Plaque Attack; River Raid II; Robot Tank; Seaquest; Skiing; Spider Fighter; Stampede; All games are the Atari 2600 versions.	30 April 2026
51	Mega Cat Studios Collection 3	No	10	Flap Happy (NES); Gravibots (Genesis); Gumball in Trick-or-Treat Land (GBC); GunTneR (NES); Kudzu (GB); Machine Cave (NES); The Meating (NES); Plyuk (NES); Rocket Panda (Genesis); Super Fanger (SNES)	30 April 2026
52	Activision Collection 3	No	13	The Activision Decathlon; Barnstorming; Bridge; Chopper Command; Dolphin; Dragonfire; Ice Hockey; Kabobber; Kaboom!; Keystone Kapers; Laser Blast; Pressure Cooker; Thwocker; All games are the Atari 2600 versions.	26 June 2026
53	Banjo-Kazooie Double Pack	No	2	Banjo-Kazooie; Banjo-Tooie; Both games are native ports based on the N64 versions.	30 October 2026
54	James Pond Collection	No	4	The Aquatic Games Starring James Pond and the Aquabat; James Pond: Underwater Agent; James Pond 2: Codename RoboCod; James Pond 3: Operation Starfish; All games are the Genesis versions.	4 December 2026
As of September 2026

=== Arcade ===
Evercade arcade cartridge list
Cartridge #	Title	Legacy	# of games	Games included	Release date
01	Technōs Arcade 1	Yes	8	Battle Lane Vol. 5; Blockout; The Combatribes; Double Dragon II: The Revenge; Double Dragon 3: The Rosetta Stone; Mania Challenge; Minky Monkey; Mysterious Stones: Dr. John's Adventure	8 December 2021
02	Data East Arcade 1	No	10	Bad Dudes Vs. DragonNinja; BreakThru; BurgerTime; Chain Reaction; Darwin 4078; Gate of Doom; Lock 'n' Chase; Sly Spy; Tumblepop; Wizard Fire	8 December 2021
03	Gaelco Arcade 1	No	6	Alligator Hunt; Biomechanical Toy; Glass; Snow Board Championship; Thunder Hoop; World Rally	8 December 2021
04	Atari Arcade 1	Yes	13	Asteroids (mislabeled as Asteroids Deluxe); Canyon Bomber; Centipede; Crystal Castles; Liberator; Lunar Lander; Millipede; Missile Command; Night Driver; Pong; Sky Diver; Super Breakout; Warlords	8 December 2021
05	Jaleco Arcade 1	No	8	64th Street; The Astyanax; Avenging Spirit; Cybattler; E.D.F. Earth Defense Force; P-47: The Phantom Fighter; Rod Land; Saint Dragon	28 July 2022
06	Gaelco Arcade 2	No	6	Big Karnak; Maniac Square; Squash; TH Strikes Back: Thunder Hoop 2; Touch and Go; World Rally 2: Twin Racing	2 November 2022
07	Irem Arcade 1	Yes	6	10-Yard Fight; Battle Chopper; In the Hunt; Lightning Swords; Moon Patrol; R-Type	15 December 2022
08	Toaplan Arcade 1	No	8	Alcon; Flying Shark; Guardian; Snow Bros.; Teki Paki; Tiger-Heli; Truxton; Zero Wing	15 December 2022
09	Toaplan Arcade 2	No	7	Demon's World; Fire Shark; Hellfire; Rally Bike; Twin Cobra; Twin Hawk; Wardner	28 April 2023
10	Piko Interactive Arcade 1	No	9	Burglar X; Diver Boy; Dragon Master; Fancy World: Earth of Crisis; The Legend of Silkroad; Magic Purple; Master's Fury; Steel Force; Ultimate Tennis	11 August 2023
11	Toaplan Arcade 3	No	7	Batsugun; Batsugun: Special Version; FixEight; Ghox; Out Zone; Truxton II; Vimana	28 November 2024
12	Data East Arcade 2	No	12	B-Wings; The Cliffhanger: Edward Randy; Crude Buster; Express Raider; Joe & Mac Returns; Last Mission; Midnight Resistance; Peter Pepper's Ice Cream Factory; Shootout; SRD: Super Real Darwin; Super BurgerTime; Trio the Punch	28 November 2024
13	Toaplan Arcade 4	No	6	Dogyuun; Grind Stormer; Knuckle Bash; Pipi & Bibi's; Sky Shark (NES); Snow Bros. 2: With New Elves	12 December 2024
14	Atari Arcade 2	No	10	Berzerk; Dark Planet; Fire Truck; Frenzy; Lost Tomb; Maze Invaders; Minefield; Moon War; Rescue; Tazz-Mania	25 April 2025
15	Windjammers, Karnov & Friends	No	5	Atomic Runner Chelnov; Karnov; Rohga: Armor Force; Vapor Trail: Hyper Offence Formation; Windjammers (Neo Geo)	10 July 2025
16	Neo Geo Arcade 1	No	6	Ironclad (unreleased MVS version); The King of Fighters 2000; Magician Lord; Metal Slug; Sengoku; Shock Troopers	29 August 2025
17	Taito Arcade 1	No	9	Bubble Bobble; Chack'n Pop; Colony 7; Don Doko Don; Growl; The Legend of Kage; Pirate Pete; Raimais; Space Invaders	25 September 2025
18	Taito Arcade 2	No	9	Alpine Ski; The Electric Yo-Yo; Elevator Action; Kiki Kaikai; Liquid Kids; The NewZealand Story; Operation Wolf; Rastan; Volfied	25 September 2025
19	Neo Geo Arcade 2	No	6	Art of Fighting 2; Crossed Swords; Garou: Mark of the Wolves; Metal Slug 2; Ninja Commando; Sengoku 2	28 November 2025
20	Neo Geo Arcade 3	No	6	Ghost Pilots; The King of Fighters '97; Metal Slug 3; Samurai Shodown II; Super Sidekicks; Twinkle Star Sprites	28 November 2025
21	Taito Arcade 3	No	9	Cadash; Cameltry; Crazy Balloon; The Fairyland Story; Football Champ; Lunar Rescue; Puzzle Bobble; Qix; Zoo Keeper	27 February 2026
22	Neo Geo Arcade 4	No	8	3 Count Bout; Baseball Stars 2; Blazing Star; Fatal Fury Special; The King of Fighters 2002; King of the Monsters; Metal Slug 4; Robo Army	26 June 2026
23	Visco Arcade 1	No	8	Andro Dunos (Neo Geo); Ashura Blaster; Asuka & Asuka; Drift Out; Galmedes; Goal! Goal! Goal! (Neo Geo); Maze of Flott; U.N. Defense Force: Earth Joker	28 August 2026
24	Visco Arcade 2	No	8	Bang Bang Busters (Neo Geo); Bang Bead (Neo Geo); Battle Flip Shot (Neo Geo); Breakers (Neo Geo); Captain Tomaday (Neo Geo); Drift Out '94: The Hard Order; Ganryu (Neo Geo); Neo Drift Out: New Technology (Neo Geo)	28 August 2026
As of July 2026

=== Home computer ===
Evercade home computer cartridge list
Cartridge #	Title	Legacy	# of games	Games included	Release date
01	THEC64 Collection 1	No	14	Alleykat; Battle Valley; Gateway to Apshai; Impossible Mission; Iridis Alpha; Jumpman; Lee; Marauder; The Movie Monster Game (Note: Due to licensing issues, Godzilla was altered and renamed to "Lizzardo".); Stormlord; Street Sports Baseball; Subterranea; Summer Games; Winter Games	4 November 2022
02	THEC64 Collection 2	No	14	California Games; Cybernoid: The Fighting Machine; Firelord; Impossible Mission II; Insects in Space; Mission Impossibubble; Nebulus; Pitstop II; Slayer; Street Sports Basketball; Sword of Fargoal; Uridium; World Games; Zamzara	28 April 2023
03	Team17 Collection 1	No	10	Alien Breed: Special Edition '92; Alien Breed II: The Horror Continues; Alien Breed: Tower Assault; Arcade Pool; ATR: All Terrain Racing; Body Blows; Full Contact; Kingpin: Arcade Sports Series Bowling; Project-X: Special Edition '93; Qwak; All games are the Amiga versions.	31 May 2023
04	Delphine Software Collection 1	No	4	Another World (Amiga); Flashback (Genesis); Future Wars (Amiga); Operation Stealth (Amiga)	6 October 2023
05	Home Computer Heroes Collection 1	No	7	Attack of the PETSCII Robots (Amiga); Bridge Strike (Demo) (Amiga); Citadel Remonstered (Amiga); Farming Simulator: C64 Edition (C64); Planet X2 (C64); The Sword of Ianna (MSX2); Tanks Furry (Amiga)	14 November 2023
06	THEC64 Collection 3	No	13	Anarchy; Boulder Dash; Break Dance; Cyberdyne Warrior; Cybernoid II: The Revenge; Deliverance: Stormlord II; Exolon; Heavy Metal Paradroid; Jumpman Junior; Netherworld; Street Sports Soccer; Summer Games II; Super Cycle	29 February 2024
07	Thalamus Collection 1	No	11	Armalyte: Competition Edition; Creatures; Creatures II: Torture Trouble; Hawkeye; Heatseeker; Hunter's Moon Remastered; Nobby the Aardvark; Retrograde; Snare; Summer Camp; Winter Camp; All games are the C64 versions.	31 July 2024
08	The Bitmap Brothers Collection 2	No	6	Cadaver (Amiga); Cadaver: The Payoff (Amiga); The Chaos Engine 2 (Amiga); Gods (Amiga); Magic Pockets (Amiga); Z (PS1)	30 September 2024
09	Roguecraft DX	No	1	Roguecraft DX	29 August 2025
10	The Llamasoft Collection	No	27	Commodore VIC-20: Abductor; Andes Attack; Deflex V; Gridrunner; Hellgate; Laser Zone; Matrix: Gridrunner 2; Metagalactic Llamas: Battle at the Edge of Time; Ratman!; Commodore 64: Anciptial; Attack of the Mutant Camels; Batalyx; Gridrunner; Hellgate; Hover Bovver; Laser Zone; Matrix: Gridrunner 2; Metagalactic Llamas: Battle at the Edge of Time; Revenge of the Mutant Camels; Revenge of the Mutant Camels II; Sheep in Space; Voidrunner; ZX Spectrum: City Bomb; Superdeflex; Atari ST: Llamatron 2112; Revenge of the Mutant Camels; Super Gridrunner	29 August 2025
11	The Doom Collection	No	2	Doom; Doom II: Hell on Earth; Expansion Packs: Doom: Deathmatch Pack; Master Levels for Doom II; No Rest for the Living; The Plutonia Experiment (Final Doom Part 2); Sigil; Sigil II; TNT: Evilution (Final Doom Part 1); Both games and all packs are native ports based on the MS-DOS versions.	30 October 2026
12	The Last Ninja and IK Collection	No	14	Commodore 64: International Karate; International Karate +; The Last Ninja; Last Ninja 2: Back with a Vengeance; Last Ninja 3; Ninja Remix; ZX Spectrum: International Karate; International Karate +; Last Ninja 2: Back with a Vengeance; Atari ST: International Karate; International Karate +; Last Ninja 2: Back with a Vengeance; Last Ninja 3; Last Ninja Remix	4 December 2026
As of September 2026

=== Other ===
The following Capcom games were not released in cartridge form, only as pack-in titles for the Evercade EXP and Evercade Alpha devices.

Games	Evercade EXP	Evercade Alpha: Street Fighter Edition	Evercade Alpha: Mega Man Edition
1942	Yes	No	No
1943: The Battle of Midway	Yes	No	No
1944: The Loop Master	Yes	No	No
Bionic Commando	Yes	No	No
Breath of Fire (SNES)	Yes	No	No
Captain Commando	Yes	No	No
Carrier Air Wing	No	No	Yes
Commando	Yes	No	No
Final Fight	Yes	No	Yes
Forgotten Worlds	Yes	No	No
Ghouls 'n Ghosts	Yes	No	No
Knights of the Round	No	No	Yes
Legendary Wings	Yes	No	No
Mega Man (NES)	Yes	No	No
Mega Man: The Power Battle	No	No	Yes
Mega Man 2 (NES)	Yes	No	No
Mega Man 2: The Power Fighters	No	No	Yes
Mega Man X (SNES)	Yes	No	No
Mercs	Yes	No	No
Street Fighter Alpha	No	Yes	No
Street Fighter Alpha 2	No	Yes	No
Street Fighter Alpha 3	No	Yes	No
Street Fighter II: Champion Edition	No	Yes	No
Street Fighter II Turbo	Yes	No	No
Super Puzzle Fighter II Turbo	No	Yes	No
Super Street Fighter II Turbo	No	Yes	No
Strider	Yes	No	Yes
Vulgus	Yes	No	No
