= Master Boy =

Master Boy may refer to:

- Chūka Ichiban! a managa also known as Cooking Master Boy
- Masterboy, a music group
- Master Boy, a 1987 arcade game by spanish games developer Gaelco
