= Radikal Bikers =

1998 video game

- North American arcade flyer
- Developer: Gaelco (Note: Ported to PlayStation by Bit Managers)
- Publishers: Arcade: EU: Gaelco; NA: Atari Games; JP: SNK; Infogrames (PlayStation)
- Director: Josep Quingles
- Programmers: Alexander Ekjanov; Diego Campos; Enric Vives
- Artists: Toni López Yeste; Xavier Arrebola G. Xavier Fradera
- Composer: Joan Sanmarti
- Platforms: Arcade, PlayStation, Evercade
- Release: Arcade: EU: March 1998; NA: June 1998; JP: December 1998; PlayStation: EU: June 23, 1999; Evercade: NA: May 31, 2023
- Genres: Action, racing
- Modes: Single-player, multiplayer
- Arcade system: Gaelco 3D Hardware

Radikal Bikers is a racing arcade game developed by Spanish company Gaelco in 1998, with a conversion for PlayStation developed by Bit Managers released in Europe in 1999. The spiritual successor to this game was Smashing Drive.

== Gameplay ==
Arcade version screenshot

Radikal Bikers is set in a Mediterranean environment, and is based on delivering pizza on a rare Italian scooter called Italjet Dragster in heavy traffic before the AI opponent does, while getting points. The arcade version has three difficulty levels, which correspond to each of the different places: Margherita (easy, set in Milan), Capricciosa (medium, set in Rome), and Diabola (hard, set in Naples). If the player beats all four races in a level, they can play the next level free. The PlayStation version includes four more locations on top of the original three as part of the extended Radikal mode: Marinara (set in Venice), Fantasia (set in Paris), Reggiana (set in London) and Americana (set in New York)

=== Points ===
- Win one race - +50000 (Arcade) / Up to +10000 (Radikal);
- Get Power-up - +1000 (Arcade) / +100 (Radikal) each;
- Power Kick destructions - +1000 (Arcade) / +100 (Radikal) each;
- Grabbing an Extra Point Power-up - +3000 (Arcade) / +400 (Radikal) each;
- Grabbing a bad Power-up - -100 each.

=== Power-ups ===
- Turbo - Indicated by the letter "T", which gives the High Speed, which is incompatible with Power Kick;
- Power Kick - Indicated by the "bomb", which allows you to blow up cars by kicking them in the side for points, and is also incompatible with Turbo;
- Extra Points - Indicated by "+$", which gives a bonus of 3000 points in Arcade Mode, or 400 points in Radikal Mode;
- Extra Time - Indicated by the "hourglass", which gives +1 second of time;
- The Joker - Indicated by the "?", which gives a Random power-up or extra points, which is actually based on its position and the biker you choose.

=== Characters ===
On the Arcade version are:

- Carlo - From "Paolo's Maniak Pizza";
- Gino - From "Frenzy Mario Pizza", but is present in the PlayStation version with the new name Paolo;
- Nina - From "Paolo's Maniak Pizza", but is present in the PlayStation version (under different clothes and complexion) with the name Mbelle;
- Sofia - From "Frenzy Mario Pizza", she is also present in the PlayStation version of the game.

Finally, on the PlayStation version there are three new characters: Albert, Gus and Noodles.

== Release ==
The previously cancelled Game Boy Color version of the game was released on the Evercade console as part of the Piko Interactive Collection 3 on May 31, 2023.

== Reception ==
Reception

Review scores
Publication	Score	
Publication	Arcade	PS
Next Generation	4/5	N/A
MAN!AC	N/A	46%
Mega Fun	N/A	49%
MeriStation	N/A	5.8/10
Power Unlimited	N/A	61/100
Video Games	N/A	33%

Next Generation reviewed the arcade version of the game, rating it four stars out of five, and stated that "There's nothing else quite like this gem in the arcades, and it's sure to bring a smile to your face."
