= Splatterhouse =

1988 video game

- Japanese arcade flyer
- Developer: Namco
- Publishers: JP: Namco; NA: Sharp Image Electronics; NA: NEC (TG16)
- Director: Shigeru Yokoyama
- Producers: Kazumi Mizuno; Haya Paya
- Programmer: PSQGL
- Artists: M. Ishida; T. Oda
- Composers: Katsuro Tajima; Yoshinori Kawamoto; Yuichiro Komoriya
- Series: Splatterhouse
- Platforms: Arcade, TurboGrafx-16, FM Towns Marty, mobile phone
- Release: Arcade: JP: November 1988; NA/EU: March 1989; TurboGrafx-16: JP: April 3, 1990; NA: August 1990; Mobile: WW: November 2010
- Genre: Beat 'em up
- Modes: Single-player, multiplayer

Splatterhouse (Note: Japanese: スプラッターハウス, Hepburn: Supurattāhausu) is a 1988 beat 'em up video game developed and published by Namco for arcades. It was the first in a series of games released in home console and personal computer formats. This game would later spawn the parody Splatterhouse: Wanpaku Graffiti, the sequels Splatterhouse 2, Splatterhouse 3, and the 2010 remake Splatterhouse, with the classic games being added to Namco Museum since 2017.

The game is notable for its disturbing subject matter and graphic violence, which was heavily emphasized in its marketing; for example, the TurboGrafx-16 port of Splatterhouse had a faux parental advisory warning printed on the front of the box that read, "The horrifying theme of this game may be inappropriate for young children... and cowards."

== Gameplay ==
Splatterhouse is an arcade-style sidescrolling beat 'em up with platform elements in which the player controls Rick, a parapsychology college major who is trapped inside West Mansion. After his resurrection by the Terror Mask, Rick makes his way through the mansion, fighting off hordes of creatures in a vain attempt to save his girlfriend Jennifer from a grisly fate. The game is influenced by western horror films, such as Friday the 13th, Evil Dead II, Poltergeist, Rejuvenatrix, and Parasite, as well as imagery inspired by the works of horror writer H. P. Lovecraft such as Herbert West–Reanimator.

Similar to many sidescrolling beat 'em up games, Rick can only move in a two-dimensional environment. He has the ability to jump and can punch and kick. Rick also has a Special Attack, where he will perform a dropkick that sends him skidding along the ground, damaging any enemies he hits. Rick can also perform a low kick, low punch, and jumping attacks, as well as pick up and use various weapons placed in the levels.

All of the levels consist of walking left to right, with occasional auto-scrolling segments. However, alternative pathways through sections of the house are possible by falling down through holes or jumping up onto ladders. In this way, branching gameplay is possible, if only prevalent in the middle levels. Levels culminate in boss fights that take place in a single room.

Unlike traditional sidescrolling fighters, boss fights have varying objectives and styles. Unlike most arcade games in the genre, Splatterhouse sends players back to checkpoints after losing lives or receiving a game over, discouraging "credit feeding" as a method of overcoming the various challenges.

== Plot ==
An arcade version screenshot of Rick battling Piggy Man using a shotgun in Stage III

Two students at the local university, Rick Taylor and Jennifer Willis, take refuge from a storm in West Mansion, a local landmark known as "Splatterhouse", for the rumors of hideous experiments purportedly conducted there by Dr. West, a renowned and missing parapsychologist. As they enter the mansion and the door shuts behind them, Jennifer screams.

Rick awakens in a dungeon under the mansion having been resurrected thanks to the influence of the "Terror Mask", a Mayan sacrificial artifact from West's house which is capable of sentient thought. The mask attaches itself to Rick, fusing with his body and transforming him into a monster with superhuman strength. With the mask's encouragement, Rick goes on a rampage through the dungeon and the mansion grounds, killing hordes of monsters.

Inside the mansion, Rick finds Jennifer, prone on a couch and surrounded by a throng of creatures that retreat upon his arrival. After their departure, Jennifer transforms into a slightly taller, fanged monster that attempts to kill Rick while begging him for help. Rick is forced to kill Jennifer, who transforms back to normal and thanks him before she dies. Infuriated, Rick tracks the remaining monsters to a giant, bloody hole in the mansion's floor.

Upon entering it, Rick discovers that the mansion itself is alive. He follows a bloody hallway to the house's "womb", which produces fetus-like monsters that attack him. Rick destroys the womb, which causes the house to burst into flames as it "dies".

Escaping the burning mansion, Rick comes across a grave marker. The Terror Mask releases energy into the grave, reviving a giant monster named "Hell Chaos" that claws its way up from the earth and attempts to kill Rick. Rick destroys the creature, which unleashes a tormented ghost that dissipates into a series of bright lights. As the lights vanish, the mask shatters, turning Rick back to normal, and he flees as the house burns to the ground and the credits roll. However, after he leaves and the credits end, the Terror Mask reassembles itself and laughs evilly for several seconds as the word "END" appears in the bottom right corner of the screen.

== Release ==
The game was released in Japan in November 1988. Sharp Image Electronics released it in North America in March 1989.

Rick wields a 2×4 as a weapon in a basement with monsters chained to the walls (TurboGrafx-16).

A port of Splatterhouse was released on the TurboGrafx-16 by NEC. In addition to loss of graphical detail and removal of some sounds (standard for a port to less powerful hardware), the following edits were made to both the Japanese PC Engine and North American TurboGrafx-16 versions of the game:

- The arcade version opens with an animation of Rick and Jennifer running through the storm and into the mansion, followed by an exterior shot of the mansion and the sound of Jennifer screaming. The console version opens simply with the exterior of the mansion, and no sound effects.
- The weapon in Stage 1 and Stage 2 is changed from a meat cleaver to a wooden board.
- The weapon for the Stage 4 boss is changed from an axe to a golden meat cleaver, the only cleaver in the game.
- The crawling hand in Stage 5 no longer flashes the middle finger.
- The death of the womb boss of Stage 6 is changed from a graphic spilling of embryonic fluids into a generic fiery explosion.
- The final boss has different attacks.
- The end cutscene is changed from the original arcade ending, where the mask breaks from Rick's face, followed by a shot of him walking away from the burning mansion and an additional cut scene showing the mask reform and laugh. The ending in the TurboGrafx-16 version only shows the mask explode, followed by a picture of West Mansion burning while the credits roll, and finally a large red and orange "End" is displayed.

The following edits are exclusive to the North American TurboGrafx-16 version:

- The Terror Mask is changed from white to red with black accents. This is to keep Rick from looking too much like Jason Voorhees. The mask became more skull-like in later games.
- The cathedral arches are removed from the Stage 4 boss chamber background and the altar is removed from the following cut scene.
- The inverted cross boss of Stage 4 is replaced with a severed head.
- The final boss' grave is changed from a wooden cross to a tombstone.

The TG16 version was released on the Wii's Virtual Console in Europe on March 16, 2007; in North America on March 19, 2007; in Japan on July 3, 2007; and in Australia on July 20, 2007. The arcade version was released on May 26, 2009, on the Japanese Virtual Console.

The FM Towns Marty version was ported by Ving Co. and released only in Japan in 1992 and it is a pixel-perfect rendition of the original arcade, with no substantial changes apart from a new menu interface in the title screen.

There was also an LCD handheld game released.

In November 2010, the game was ported to J2ME/BREW mobile phones, Windows Mobile and iOS platforms to coincide with the release of the 2010 remake, which also included versions of all three original games. The only change was in the Java-based mobile phone version, where Rick's mask is modeled after the skull-like one present in the remake. This change is not present in iOS version of the game, but it includes a "Splatter Rush" mode instead, where enemies continuously spawn from both ends of a wide screen. The remake also included the uncensored Japanese arcade version as an unlockable extra.

In 2017, the game was included as a part of the Namco Museum compilation for the Nintendo Switch, through the Nintendo eShop. The PC Engine/TurboGrafx-16 version was included on the TurboGrafx-16 Mini, which was released in 2020. Hamster Corporation released the game as part of the Arcade Archives series for the Nintendo Switch and PlayStation 4 in June 2023.

== Reception ==
Reception

Aggregate score
Aggregator	Score
Metacritic	iOS: 49 / 100

Review scores
Publication	Score
Computer and Video Games	ARC: Positive; PCE: 92%
Electronic Gaming Monthly	PCE:8/10, 8/10, 8/10, 8/10
GameSpot	VC: 4.7 / 10
GameSpy	PCE: 8 / 10
IGN	VC: 6.5 / 10 iOS: 4.5 / 10
Nintendo Life	VC: 8/10

In Japan, Game Machine listed Splatterhouse as the sixth most popular arcade game of December 1988. Following its European release at the ATEI show in January 1989, Computer and Video Games gave the arcade version a positive review.

Splatterhouse received positive reviews upon release, with praise for its graphics, music and general gameplay. It is also known for its graphic violence, which was inspired by classic '80s horror movies. The game did receive some criticism for its lack of variety and simplistic nature, but it was otherwise praised for being challenging.

The PC-Engine/Turbografx-16 versions also received praise for their faithful recreations of the arcade game but the North-American console version was criticised for its "toned-down gore" due to controversy while the Japanese PC-Engine version saw less changes, the most notable being Rick's mask being nearly identical to the arcade version, but still sharing the occasional censorship of the American version.

IGN's Lucas M. Thomas gave a mixed review of Splatterhouse. He stated that "Putting aside the aesthetic design and just looking at the game on the merits of its mechanics, Splatterhouse is lacking." He complained about the limited variety of attacks, one way scrolling, and censorship present in the North American console version. Thomas did, however, compliment the game's horror themes and music, noting that the console graphics, despite being "toned down", are a "good representation of the arcade original".

Frank Provo of GameSpot had similar complaints: "Ultimately, the problem with Splatterhouse is that there's not much to it. There are only seven levels, and you'll finish each one in just a few minutes," he wrote, going on to explain that the enemies all follow easily memorized patterns, making the game very simple to play. In particular, Provo criticized the fact that the Virtual Console version was the censored console version, noting how he missed the meat cleavers and extra violence of the arcade game.
