= Goodboy Galaxy =

2023 video game

- Developers: Rik Nicol, Jeremy Clarke
- Programmers: Jeremy Clarke, Benjamin Johnson, Kris Ralph, Rik Nicol
- Artists: Rik Nicol, Jesse Zhang, Andreas Polyviou, Emi Monserrate, Vicente Nitti, Theodore Sterchi
- Composers: Vincent Verger aka Tuï, Rik Nicol, Jeremy Clarke, Theodore Sterchi, Mioune, Mona Roselianne, Liliia Kysil, Sonic / Jasper Byrne
- Platforms: Game Boy Advance, Nintendo Switch, Microsoft Windows, Linux, Evercade
- Release: Game Boy Advance; November 28, 2023 (digital version); Evercade; November 28, 2023; Windows, Linux; October 25, 2024; Nintendo Switch; October 30, 2026
- Genre: Action-adventure
- Modes: Single-player, multiplayer

Goodboy Galaxy is a 2023 action-adventure game developed for the Game Boy Advance in celebration of its 20th anniversary by Rik Nicol and Jeremy Clarke. It is the first full commercial Game Boy Advance release in over 13 years. The game was also released for Microsoft Windows, Linux and Evercade. A Nintendo Switch version was later released in 2026.

== Gameplay ==
Gameplay screenshot

The game has been described by its developers as an "exploration platformer", which has been inspired by Metroid and Cave Story. It involves navigating through the twisting multi-route levels to befriend various NPCs and to attain unique abilities (with the player's jet pack and blaster), which will allow players to solve various puzzles. There are over fifty unique characters to befriend and several secret areas to find.

== Plot ==
Maxwell, a space travelling dog, flees his home world after it faces near collapse. However, he is then stranded on an unknown planet after his spaceship is attacked. He now needs to secure the help of every weapon and friend he can find to have a hope of rescue.

== Development and release ==
The lead developers Rik Nicol and Jeremy Clarke first met when they both worked for a mobile game studio in the Netherlands. They first developed a basic prototype of Goodboy Galaxy known as "Goodboy Advance" at the Ludum Dare game jam. The game had several comedic character based platformer inspirations such as Crowtel Renovations, Pikuniku, and Spelunky. Mini quests were put in the game as the developers had greatly enjoyed them in The Legend of Zelda: Link's Awakening. Being a big fan of Yoshi's Island, Clarke insisted that the game have a similar cave level with waterfalls. Sonic Advance 2 and Sonic Advance 3 also inspired the developers to pull off similar background tricks. The game was subsequently developed after £203,929 was received through crowdfunding.

A pre-release demo known as Goodboy Galaxy: Chapter Zero was made available in 2021, which had content not present in the final release to avoid spoilers. The first GBA ROM of the full game was digitally released in Europe and North America alongside a physical release for Evercade on November 28, 2023. Improved versions for Microsoft Windows / Linux and Nintendo Switch that include a co-op multiplayer mode and the original content from Chapter Zero were later released on October 25, 2024 and October 30, 2026 respectively.

== Reception ==
Reception

Review scores
Publication	Score
Time Extension	9/10
Way Too Many Games	9/10

Damian McFerran of Time Extension praised the game's "gorgeous visuals and brilliantly animated cutscenes", suggesting that if it had been released during the lifespan of the GBA, it would have been hailed in the same manner as Metroid Fusion and Drill Dozer. He further described it as being akin to a Nintendo developed game with "excellent level design, likeable characters and gameplay mechanics which both befuddle and entertain". Oliver Shielding of Way Too Many Games awarded the game a 9/10 and felt that the game was as "fresh and innovative as Golden Sun, Minish Cap, or Metroid Fusion".
