= Biomechanical Toy =

1995 video game

- Developer: Zeus Software
- Publisher: Gaelco
- Designers: Raul Lopez; Ricardo Puerto
- Programmer: Ricardo Puerto
- Platform: Arcade
- Release: 1995
- Genres: Run and gun, Shoot 'em up
- Modes: Single-player, multiplayer

Biomechanical Toy is a scrolling run and gun video game released for arcades by Gaelco in 1995.

== Gameplay ==
The player takes the role of Inguz who has to traverse toyland and shoot evil toys, collect power-ups, and defeat bosses to advance levels.

== Plot ==
A criminal named Scrubby has escaped. He was imprisoned for trying to steal the Magic Pendulum, which brings toys to life. Relik, a cuckoo clock, guards the pendulum. Scrubby appears suddenly and steals the pendulum. A hero named Inguz is called upon to recover the pendulum before the toys' magical world disappears.

== Release ==
Biomechanical Toy was included as part of the Gaelco Arcade 1 compilation for Evercade, marking its first console debut.

== External ==
- Biomechanical Toy at MobyGames
- Biomechanical Toy at the Killer List of Videogames
- Mameworld entry
