= Big Karnak =

1991 video game

- Developer: Gaelco
- Publisher: Gaelco
- Director: Julian Goicoa
- Programmers: Albert Sunyer; Luis Jonama
- Artists: Toni López Yeste; Xavier Arrebola G.
- Writer: Toni López Yeste
- Composer: Josep Quingles
- Platform: Arcade
- Release: ESP: 1991
- Genre: Platform
- Modes: Single-player, multiplayer

Big Karnak is a platform game developed and published by Gaelco. It was released in arcades in 1991. Taking place in Ancient Egypt, players assume the role of a pharaoh warrior who embarks on a journey to save his wife while fighting against mythical beings and Egyptian gods. The game was a commercial success for Gaelco and received positive reviews.

== Gameplay ==
Gameplay screenshot

Big Karnak is a platform game reminiscent of Trojan and Ghouls 'n Ghosts, where players assume the role of a pharaoh warrior who embarks on a journey through four increasingly difficult levels taking place in an Ancient Egypt setting to save his wife by defeating the Egyptian gods Horus, Nut, Isis and Osiris.

During gameplay, players fight against mythical beings, acquire different weapons, solve puzzles and jump between front and back movement planes while avoiding hazards along the way. Players can also deflect certain enemy projectiles to avoid damage. Losing all the energy results in losing a life and the game is over once all lives are lost but players can insert more credits into the arcade machine to continue playing.

== Development and release ==
Big Karnak was created under the working title El Faraón by a small team at Gaelco, a Spanish game development company co-founded in 1985 by former Tecfri members Luis Jonama, Josep Quinglés and Javier Valero, serving as one of their first arcade projects alongside Master Boy. Gaelco decided to work on a horizontal-scrolling arcade game similar to Double Dragon, Bad Dudes Vs. DragonNinja and Ghouls 'n Ghosts, recruiting writer Toni López Yeste to create the artwork, scripts and animation. Yeste studied comics and illustrations at Escola Joso in Barcelona before being proposed by the school to work at Gaelco, despite never having contact with video games until then.

Yeste began writing the script for what would later become Big Karnak in June 1988 and he stated that once the script was shown, Gaelco realized it would work and production of the project began in September of that year. Yeste went to arcades in order to check recent games on the market and study them, with Ghouls 'n Ghosts being the title he studied the most but did not know Bad Dudes Vs. DragonNinja until production started. Jonama stated in a 2014 interview with the Spanish version of Retro Gamer that he, Quinglés and Valero initially started programming but later directed the games as they grew, with Jonama collaborating on the project as a programmer alongside Albert Sunyer while Quinglés specialized on sound design. Julian Goicoa was in charge of marketing the game worldwide but also acted as director and proposed changes from a commercial viewpoint. Artist Xavier Arrebola G. also created artwork for the game with Yeste. Arrebola was first introduced to video games Asteroids during his college days and joined Gaelco in 1989 when Big Karnak was in a more advanced development state due to his interest with computer graphics, being in charge of both character animations and level design.

Yeste stated that when production started, several elements from the original script for Big Karnak were added or scrapped due to either not working in the game or being deemed too difficult. Arrebola also stated that team members gave their ideas during development, as equipment and resources were limited, with Yeste claiming that enemies which broke the Egyptian aesthetic was due to the collaborative effort. Yeste also claimed a total of eight levels were originally envisioned but the number was ultimately reduced to four. When designing the carnivorous plant enemies for a level, Arrebola was inspired by Frank Oz's Little Shop of Horrors. Jonama and the team used PCs with ARPA, an in-house tool created by Gaelco that allowed artists transpose their hand-drawn animation work from graph paper into pixel art.

Big Karnak was released on arcades by Gaelco in 1991. The game was presented on various trade shows across Europe such as the 1991 European Computer Trade Show. The title was never ported to other systems, until its inclusion as part of the Gaelco Arcade 2 compilation for Evercade, marking its first console debut.

== Reception ==
According to the book Video Games Around the World, Big Karnak "achieved great success" commercially. David Wilson of Zero magazine rated the game with a 4.5 out of 5 score. Martin Gaksch of German magazine Power Play gave the title a positive outlook. Oldies Rising scored it 15 out of 20. In 2015, David Martinez of Hobby Consolas also gave it a positive outlook.

== Legacy ==
As of April 2020, the rights to Big Karnak are owned by Piko Interactive.
