= Splatterhouse (2010 video game) =

2010 video game

- Developers: BottleRocket (until 2009), Namco Bandai Games America
- Publisher: Namco Bandai Games (Note: Released under the Namco brand name.)
- Composer: Howard Drossin
- Series: Splatterhouse
- Engine: Gamebryo
- Platforms: PlayStation 3, Xbox 360
- Release: NA: November 23, 2010; AU: November 25, 2010; EU: November 26, 2010
- Genres: Beat 'em up, survival horror
- Mode: Single-player

Splatterhouse is a horror-themed beat 'em up video game developed and published by Namco Bandai Games in 2010 for PlayStation 3 and Xbox 360. It is a reimagining and a reboot of the original Splatterhouse which was released in 1988.

Splatterhouse received mixed reviews. While its graphics, soundtrack and voice acting were praised, it was criticised for its controls difficulty, glitches and repetitive gameplay.

== Gameplay ==
Splatterhouse is combat-oriented with main character Rick fighting various monsters in either hand-to-hand combat or with makeshift weapons, such as wooden planks and meat cleavers. Rick is able to attack his enemies with super strength and rip them apart. He can also chain attacks together into combos.

Rick can lose limbs, but is able to grow them back over time. Arms can be used as clubs to fight enemies.

Throughout the game, Rick collects blood from defeated enemies. Collecting a certain amount will allow the player to unlock new moves and perform special attacks. Players can find journals documenting Dr. West's history while photos of Rick's girlfriend serve as a breadcrumb trail to follow. He can perform "Splatter Kills", extremely gory finishing moves. There is also a platforming element with jump nodes to keep instant death falls to a minimum.

The game also comes with the original Splatterhouse arcade game, Splatterhouse 2 and Splatterhouse 3 as unlockables.

== Plot ==
Jennifer Willis is to have an interview with Dr. Henry West M.D., professor of necrobiology, at his house. Her boyfriend, Rick Taylor, comes along so nothing bad happens. Just as Rick is about to propose to Jennifer, the two are attacked by Dr. West's experiments, kidnapping Jennifer and leaving Rick mortally wounded. Close to death, Rick knocks over a sarcophagus revealing a sinister-looking mask - the Terror Mask. The Mask calls out to Rick, saying it will save him and help save Jennifer if he puts it on. Having no choice, Rick puts the Mask on and is transformed into a hulking beast powered by the blood of others.

Rick follows Dr. West and Jennifer through other dimensions and time periods and learns of Dr. West's plan to bring dark deities, known as "The Corrupted", into this world by sacrificing Jennifer. Dr. West believes The Corrupted will resurrect his dead love Leonora, who bears an uncanny resemblance to Jennifer and originally died of cholera. The Corrupted intended to lay waste to Earth instead. It is revealed that Dr. West and the Corrupted had previously resurrected Leonora, but she was brought back as a demonic savage. West tried to contain her and bring her back completely, but one instance she escaped; Dr. West later found her holding a porcelain doll, horrified at the fate of the child she took it from. West was later summoned away from the town of Arkham and his home on a pointless errand, only to discover that the town's populace found out about Leonora, and imprisoned her to be burned as a witch. Rick encounters Leonora while traveling through time, emerging near the alit wickerman cage as the townsfolk are turned into monsters by the Corrupted. In an attempt to save Leonora thinking she was Jennifer, Rick was attacked by her demonic form, forcing him to kill her. A young Dr. West witnesses Rick stomping on her and loses his morality, vowing to tear down the gates of heaven and ascending on a pile of corpses, built from the townsfolk of Arkham and topped with Rick's dead body.

In the end, Rick succeeds in rescuing Jennifer and thwarting West's plans; however, the Overlord, leader of the Corrupted, emerges, summoned from the killings Rick committed through the game and constructed from the bodies of 10,000 monsters. The Mask informs Rick that he knew that Rick's killing would release it, stating that he wanted the Corrupted to know that it was the Mask that stopped them, and for that to happen, he needed to let them out. Rick and the Mask manage to kill it and sate the Mask's thirst for vengeance, but in the process, a stray spirit possesses Jennifer. Believing his deal with the Mask to be done, Rick tries to pry it off; however, aware of Jennifer's possession, it refuses. It is implied from West's reaction that the stray spirit is Leonora's.

== Development and promotion ==
According to Makoto Iwai, a then-senior vice president of Namco Bandai's American branch, he was tasked with finding a game to release that would be popular with American audiences. Realizing that a sequel to Splatterhouse might appeal to older audiences interested in games like Grand Theft Auto, and seeing Capcom's success with Resident Evil, Namco Bandai approved the concept.

In early 2009, BottleRocket revealed that Namco Bandai Games had made the decision to cut the developer from the project, and had already taken back their console development kits. With no other projects or funding on their plate, BottleRocket was effectively shuttered as a result. Namco Bandai Games explained that the move was due to a "performance issue". The project was handed over to the internal development team at Namco Bandai Games who had recently completed Afro Samurai. Weeks later, it became known that Namco Bandai Games hired members of the original development staff from BottleRocket to help finish the game.

The game's story and dialogue was penned by comic book writer Gordon Rennie. Howard Drossin composed original scores and the protagonist Rick Taylor (in his non-possessed look) was modelled after him.

Splatterhouse was originally announced by Namco Bandai on May 29, 2008, with an expected release for the Xbox 360 and PlayStation 3 in 2009. In June 2009, Namco Bandai said that the game would be delayed to the following year, which they later narrowed down to a Q3 2010 release date. Splatterhouse was finally released on November 23, 2010.

As part of promotions leading up to the game's release, Splatterhouse was featured on the cover of Fangoria issue #295 in June 2010. This was the first video game ever featured as a central cover on the horror magazine. The cover featured custom artwork by Dave Wilkins (the game's art director), and the article featured an interview with the design team by Fangoria's lead video game coverage writer Doug Norris. In addition, Namco Bandai announced a partnership with Globe International to create a special edition shoe based on the game, and Playboy featured character Jennifer Willis as a centerfold in its December 2010 issue.

== Soundtrack ==
Splatterhouse: Music From the Video Game

Soundtrack album by Various Artists
- Released: November 23, 2010
- Genres: Thrash metal, heavy metal, groove metal, death metal
- Producer: Howard Drossin

1. "Pounding Nails (Into the Lid of Your Coffin)" – The Accüsed (03:08)
2. "Dream Song" – ASG (03:49)
3. "Must Kill" – Cavalera Conspiracy (04:50)
4. "Dying Breed" – Five Finger Death Punch (02:55)
5. "Apocalyptic Havoc" – Goatwhore (03:16)
6. "Hollow Ground" – The Haunted (04:10)
7. "Fire, Flood & Plague" – High on Fire (06:08)
8. "The Rebirth" – Hell Within (5:21)
9. "Walk with Me in Hell" – Lamb of God (05:11)
10. "Blood and Thunder" – Mastodon (03:49)
11. "Rigorous Vengeance" – Municipal Waste (02:13)
12. "Morbid Dismemberment" – Mutant Supremacy (03:14)
13. "Dead Shall Rise" – Terrorizer (03:32)
14. "Headlong into Monsters" – WolfShirt (03:18)

Note: Splatterhouse co-producer Dan Tovar is a member of the bands Invisible Enemies and WolfShirt. Also, Cannibal Corpse, In Flames and Gwar were mentioned by Tovar in the 10/2009 issue of Play Magazine as being on the soundtrack; however, this ultimately proved to be false.

== Reception ==
Reception

Aggregate score
Aggregator	Score	
Aggregator	PS3	Xbox 360
Metacritic	59/100	62/100

Review scores
Publication	Score	
Publication	PS3	Xbox 360
Destructoid	7.5/10	N/A
Edge	5/10	5/10
Eurogamer	6/10	N/A
GamePro	3.5/5	N/A
GameRevolution	C	N/A
GameSpot	4.5/10	4.5/10
GameTrailers	N/A	6.4/10
GameZone	6.5/10	N/A
Giant Bomb	3/5	3/5
IGN	4/10	4/10
Joystiq	N/A	2.5/5
Official Xbox Magazine (US)	N/A	7/10
PlayStation: The Official Magazine	3/10	N/A
The Daily Telegraph	6/10	N/A
The Escapist	N/A	3/5

The game received "mixed" reviews on both platforms according to the review aggregation website Metacritic.

Eurogamer said of the PlayStation 3 version: "Splatterhouse is only reasonably good at being the classless procession of shock and bad taste that it wants to be." GameSpot's Kevin VanOrd said of the game: "All the gore in the world can't disguise Splatterhouse's laundry list of clumsy mechanics." He criticized the camera, load times, glitches and cheap deaths, but praised the story and the inspired artistic touches. IGN's Arthur Gies said: "Some occasionally slick visuals and funky design are undermined by camera and framerate problems and enemy variety that dries up halfway through."

The A.V. Club gave the PS3 version a B+, saying, "Going by mechanics alone, Splatterhouse is solid, though uninspired. But the extra touches help elevate it from passable distraction to entertaining diversion." The Guardian gave the same console version four stars out of five, calling it "a vulgar, noisy, shallow, juvenile, gruesome gem of a game that never forgets to be fun, even when going out of its way to be as appalling as possible." However, The Daily Telegraph gave the same console version six out of ten, saying that "On the whole, Splatterhouse achieves what it sets out to do, even if it is spoiled in parts by some sloppy execution and technical niggles. It's mindless, tasteless and ultimately throwaway, but as the mask often intones: 'I could say I wasn't enjoying this ... but that would be a lie.'" The Escapist gave the Xbox 360 version a similar score of three stars out of five, saying, "The recycled brawling mechanics and frustrating platforming don't do anything to support the cliché story and no amount of blood, profanity or nudity can save Splatterhouse from mediocrity."

Tom Vote of 411Mania gave the Xbox 360 version 5.4 out of 10: saying, "While offering a decent soundtrack, and copious amounts of blood and gore, the game ultimately falls flat in several areas." However, Jeffery Harris of the same website gave the PS3 version 7.2 out of 10, saying: "I don't think the game is as bad as some reviews have made it out to be. I think the new Splatterhouse is a fun albeit somewhat flawed and disappointing game with a really solid story and a unique art design and presentation. I think the game lacks some certain control and gameplay polish and it could've used a better climax and maybe a couple extra stages. It feels in some ways like an incomplete game that could've used another year of development due to the already tumultuous development process the game went through in early stages with BottleRocket."
