= Alligator Hunt =

1994 video game

- Developer: Gaelco
- Publisher: Gaelco
- Director: Luis Jonama
- Producer: Angel Porras
- Designers: Esteve Polls; Toni López Yeste
- Programmers: Alexander Ekjanov; Diego Campos
- Artists: Xavier Arrebola G. Xavier Fradera; Toni Rodríguez
- Composer: Joan Sanmarti
- Platform: Arcade
- Release: ESP: 1994; JP: 1995
- Genre: Shooting gallery
- Modes: Single-player, multiplayer
- Arcade system: Gaelco GAE1

Alligator Hunt is a shoot 'em up arcade video game released by Spanish company Gaelco in 1994.

== Gameplay ==
Gameplay screenshot

Reptilian-looking aliens are invading earth and is up to the bravest soldiers (skateboarding kids) to stop the invasion and destroy the enemy base. The gameplay of Alligator Hunt is similar to Cabal and Blood Bros..

== Development and release ==
Alligator Hunt was developed by Gaelco.

As of April 2020, the rights to Alligator Hunt were acquired by Piko Interactive. The game was included as part of the Gaelco Arcade 1 compilation for Evercade, marking its first console debut.

== Reception ==
According to Spanish website MeriStation, Alligator Hunt sold few arcade units. Carlos Forcada of MeriStation gave the game a positive retrospective outlook.
