= Alwa's Legacy =

- Developer: Elden Pixels
- Publisher: Elden Pixels
- Designer: Mikael Forslind
- Engine: Unity
- Platforms: Linux; macOS; Windows; Nintendo Switch; PlayStation 4
- Release: Linux, macOS, Windows; June 17, 2020; Nintendo Switch; September 29, 2020; PlayStation 4 November 30, 2021
- Genre: Metroidvania
- Mode: Single-player

Alwa's Legacy is a Metroidvania video game developed by Elden Pixels and first released in 2020. After saving the land of Alwa in Elden Pixels' previous game, Alwa's Awakening, series protagonist Zoe attempts to return home to her original world.

== Gameplay ==
Players control Zoe, a girl who has been summoned to the world of Alwa. After her adventures in Alwa's Awakening, Zoe attempts to return home but finds enemies standing in her way. Although a sequel, the story is standalone. Alwa's Legacy clones Metroidvania-style games from the 16-bit era. It is a side-scrolling video game with puzzle-platform elements and pixel art. An alternate mode, when unlocked, challenges players to win the game without violence.

== Development ==
Alwa's Legacy was funded on Kickstarter. Before beginning the design, Elden Pixels made a list of the most common complaints made about Alwa's Awakening and tried to improve on each of them. In particular, they wanted to improve the map, reduce backtracking, and speed up protagonist Zoe's movement. It was released for Windows and Linux on June 17, 2020. Because of their small size, self-publishing on multiple platforms was impossible, and the Nintendo Switch port was delayed. The Switch port was released on September 29, 2020. Like the first game, Switch sales outpaced those from Steam. In September 2021, it was bundled with the previous game, Alwa's Awakening, in Alwa's Collection for the PlayStation 4 and Switch.

== Reception ==
Reception

Aggregate scores
Aggregator	Score
Metacritic	(PC) 78/100 (NS) 80/100
OpenCritic	80% recommend

Review scores
Publication	Score
Nintendo Life	9/10
Nintendo World Report	8/10

The PC and Nintendo Switch versions of Alwa's Legacy both received generally favorable reviews from critics, according to the review aggregation website Metacritic. Fellow review aggregator OpenCritic assessed that the game received strong approval, being recommended by 80% of critics. Multiple reviews mentioned the improvements made since the previous games. NintendoWorldReport's reviewer praised the more modern gameplay elements, PC Gamer praised the improved map, and TouchArcade called it a "very strong, if somewhat safe, entry in the genre" with improved mechanics over the previous game. Nintendojo said that it "ups the ante in virtually every way" and called it "a brilliant addition to Switch's library". Nintendo Life said that it "routinely demonstrates mastery of the elements necessary to a good Metroidvania".
