= Alwa's Awakening =

2017 video game

- Developer: Elden Pixels
- Publisher: Elden Pixels
- Designer: Mikael Forslind
- Engine: Unity
- Platforms: Linux; macOS; Windows; Nintendo Switch; PlayStation 4; Xbox One; Nintendo Entertainment System; Evercade
- Release: NA: February 2, 2017 (PC); NA: September 27, 2018 (NS); NA: March 21, 2019 (PS4); NA: November 5, 2019 (XBO); NA: 2022 (NES)
- Genre: Metroidvania
- Mode: Single-player

Alwa's Awakening is a 2017 Metroidvania video game developed and published by Swedish studio Elden Pixels.

== Gameplay ==
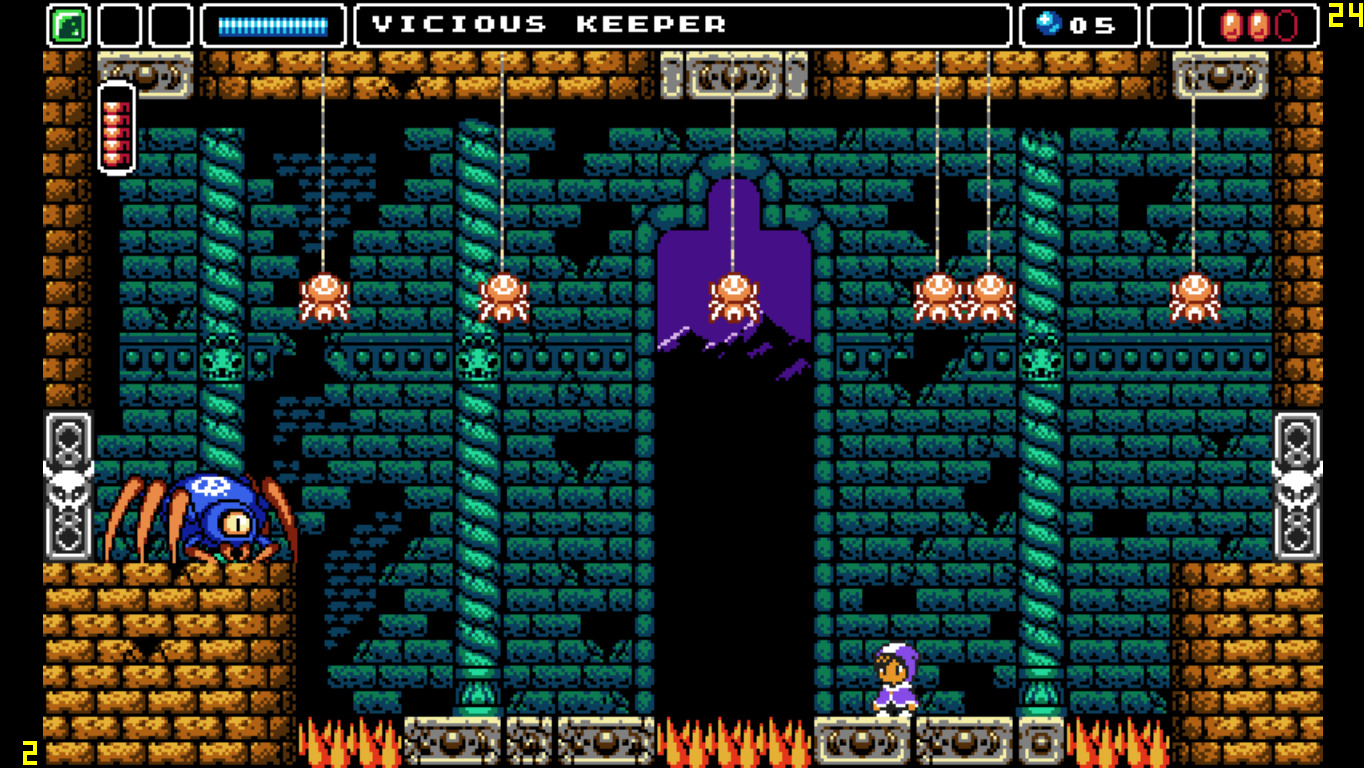
Zoe fights the first boss of the game.

The protagonist, Zoe, is magically transported to the land of Alwa, where she must rescue the helpless citizens from an evil overlord and his henchmen. The gameplay is modeled after the 8-bit era of console games, and it uses pixel art graphics. It is a Metroidvania-style game, a subgenre of side-scrolling video games with puzzle-platform elements. The game implements checkpoints, where players can resume playing if they are killed. Players can respawn like this indefinitely.

== Development ==
Mikael Forslind, the lead game designer and CEO of Elden Pixels, was inspired by Battle Kid: Fortress of Peril and Trine 2 to make a platform game that focused more on interesting level design than combat. They wanted to create an homage that could pass as a game that came directly from the 8-bit era, with all of its limitations, such as a 4:3 aspect ratio and pixel art. It was released for Linux, macOS, and Windows on February 2, 2017, the Nintendo Switch on September 27, 2018, and the PlayStation 4 on March 21, 2019. Elden Pixels said the Switch port sold as many copies in its first week as the Steam version had in its first month. In 2021, Alwa's Awakening: 8-bit Edition, a port to the Nintendo Entertainment System in the form of a physical ROM cartridge, was announced. Alwa's Awakening was also separately bundled with the sequel, Alwa's Legacy, in Alwa's Collection.

== Reception ==
On Metacritic, Alwa's Awakening received mixed reviews for PCs and positive reviews for the Nintendo Switch. Rock Paper Shotgun called it "a really splendid example" of early Metroidvania games that, while not revolutionary, adds its own original and interesting ideas to the formula. Describing the gameplay as "undercooked", Hardcore Gamer said it focuses too much on nostalgia for its own sake. Hardcore Gaming 101 said Alwa's Awakening is a likeable but unambitious game that "never quite feels like it reaches its full potential". Nintendo Life called it "a quality Metroidvania experience that’s well worth your time" that nonetheless fails to distinguish itself from its competitors. NintendoWorldReport wrote, "While it doesn't reinvent the wheel, it is extremely polished and nails the retro vibe it aspires for."
