= Evercade VS =

2021 video game console

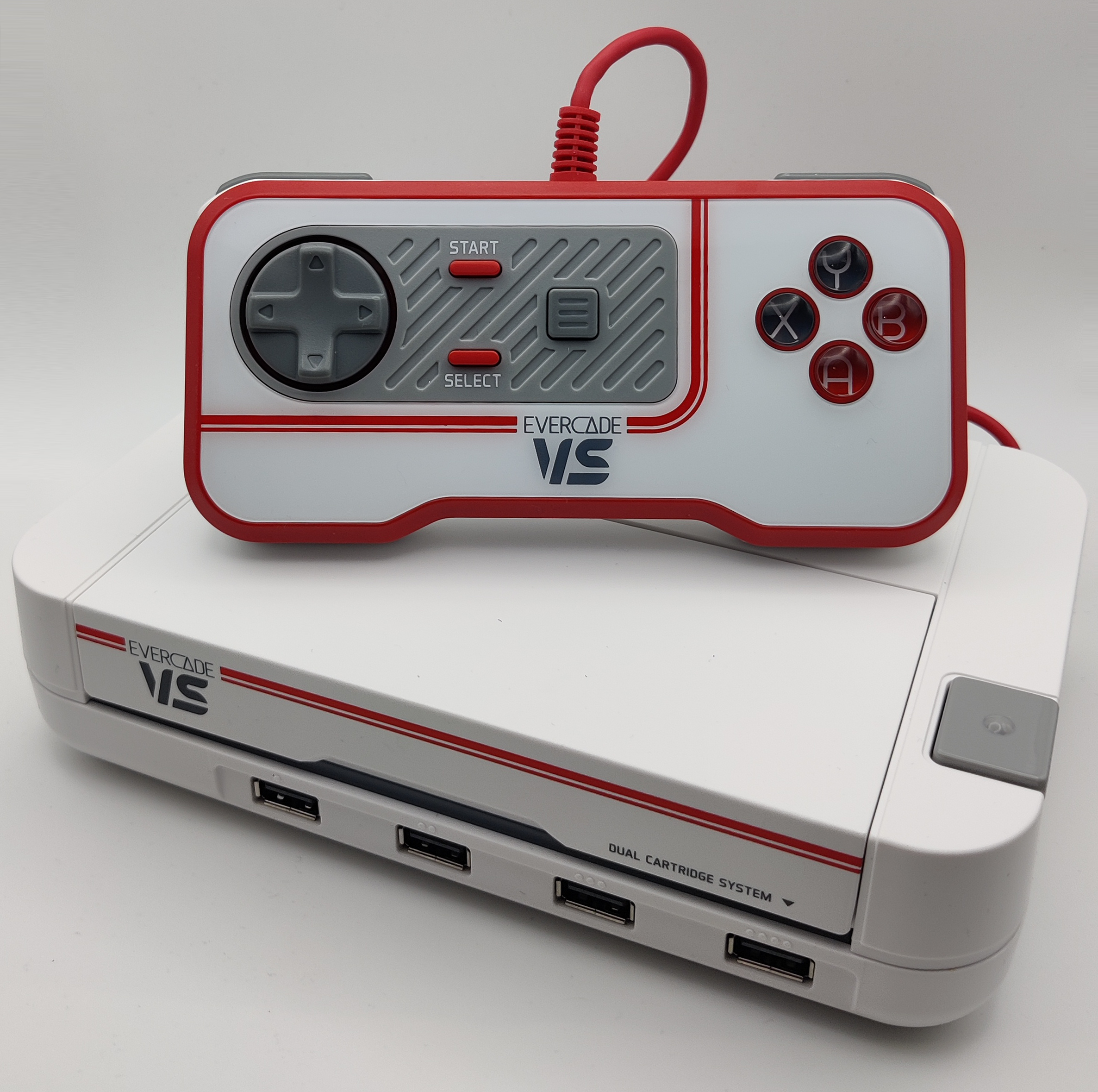
- Developer: Blaze Entertainment
- Product family: Evercade Series
- Type: Video game console
- Generation: Eighth
- Released: December 2021
- Availability: Currently active
- Introductory price: £89.99/$99 (basic) £109/$129 (premium)
- Media: ROM cartridge
- Operating system: Linux based
- System on a chip: Rockchip RK3328
- CPU: ARM Cortex-A53 quad-core processor @ 1.5Ghz
- Memory: 512MB (DRAM DDR3)
- Storage: 4GB
- Display: 1.1kg
- Controller input: Evercade VS Licensed Controllers (Supports Evercade as a controller and Wired USB controllers)
- Camera: None
- Touchpad: None
- Connectivity: Wi-Fi
- Power: Micro USB
- Current firmware: v4.0.6 (as of 30 April 2025)
- Backward compatibility: All Evercade cartridges
- Predecessor: Evercade
- Successor: Evercade EXP
- Related: Evercade Handheld
- Website: www.evercade.co.uk

Evercade VS is a video game console developed by British company Blaze Entertainment. It is an upgraded home console version of the original Evercade handheld that introduces multiplayer functionality. It was released in December 2021 in Europe, and on 25 February 2022 in the United States.

== History ==
On 26 March 2021, Blaze Entertainment announced that a product known as the Evercade VS would be revealed on 23 April 2021. After much speculation about what the product may be, the company revealed a backwards-compatible home console version of the Evercade handheld with the addition of multiplayer. The Evercade VS was originally scheduled to release on 3 November 2021. However, it was delayed due to the 2021–2022 global supply chain crisis. It received a European release in mid-December 2021, while the U.S. release occurred on February 25, 2022.

A Starter Pack retails for £89 or $99, and includes the console, a controller, and one cartridge. A Premium Pack adds an additional controller and cartridge for £109 or $129.

On April 16th 2024, Blaze Entertainment announced that the console would be discontinued and replaced with a cheaper revision called the Evercade VS-R. It was released in July 2024 and retail for £89 or $99. This revision will use the same hardware but includes different games and a differently coloured console. This revision received different colour variants in 2025.

== Hardware ==
The Evercade VS features an ARM Cortex-A53 1.5 GHz quad-core processor backed by 512MB of DRAM and 4GB of internal storage. A version of Linux is used as the base for its operating system. The console also features Wi-Fi connectivity exclusively for firmware updates and bug fixes. It is capable of 1080p output via HDMI, compared with the handheld's 720p output. It is powered through a USB plug.

The console introduces multiplayer functionality through four controller ports. Evercade VS controllers use USB plug-ins, and the console also supports third-party USB controllers, including wireless ones. In addition, the Evercade handheld can be connected to the console and used as a controller, with the use of a special cable. Unlike the handheld, the VS controller features two additional shoulder buttons and a menu button.

The console contains two cartridge slots, allowing for the game libraries of two cartridges to be shown onscreen simultaneously for faster selection. The cartridge slot is covered by a small flap, resembling the design of the Nintendo Entertainment System.

== Games ==
The Evercade VS is backwards-compatible with all Evercade cartridges except for Namco Museum Collections 1 and 2 because those collections were only licensed for handheld use. Blaze hopes to expand the license to achieve full compatibility soon. All games are compatible between both Evercade consoles. Games can be sorted by title, release date, or number of players on the main console menu. Games offer save states, allowing players to resume where they left off. The console has several aspect ratios, and screen options such as scanlines.

== Reception ==
The Evercade VS received generally positive reviews. Steven Petite of GameSpot called it "a wonderful little retro console" with a "great" design and a large game library. Andrew Webster of The Verge praised the addition of multiplayer, and wrote that like the original Evercade, the VS is "still niche and aimed at a very specific audience — and still does its job very well".

However, Chris Scullion of Video Games Chronicle wrote that the console's main issue "is that it only really appeals to a very particular niche and is unlikely to ever see mass appeal as a result". He also found the console to be "exceptionally light, to the extent that it feels cheaply made". Other reviewers were critical of the controllers. Matthew Adler of IGN wrote that the plastic build quality of the controllers "is on par with a child's toy," stating that they feel "completely hollow when held". Mike Fahey of Kotaku also referred to the controllers as "lightweight plastic, like children's toys", writing, "The buttons are crisp and responsive, but the overall hollow feel keeps putting me off". James Trew of Engadget stated, "The general design is fine and comfortable, but it doesn't feel quite as ergonomic as the handheld or other controllers".
