= Tanglewood (2018 video game) =

2018 video game

- Developer: Big Evil Corporation
- Publisher: Big Evil Corporation
- Designer: Matt Phillips
- Programmer: Matt Phillips
- Artists: Armen Mardirossian; Matthew Weekes; Simon Butler; Drew Lake; Krzysztof Matys; Javier Degirolmo (font design)
- Composer: Nathan 'freezedream' Stanley
- Platforms: Sega Genesis/Mega Drive, Windows, macOS, Linux, Dreamcast, Evercade, Nintendo Switch
- Release: 14 August 2018; Nintendo Switch; 16 December 2025
- Genres: Platform, puzzle
- Mode: Single-player

Tanglewood is a 2018 puzzle platform video game developed and published by Big Evil Corporation for the Sega Genesis/Mega Drive. It was crowdfunded through Kickstarter and released on 14 August 2018, with emulated versions available for Windows, Mac, and Linux on Steam and a dual-game cartridge for the Evercade along with Xeno Crisis.

The game was released on physical carts playable on Mega Drive systems. A director's cut for the Nintendo Switch, titled Tanglewood: Definitive Edition, was released on 16 December 2025. A scheduled Dreamcast port was put on hiatus as of May 2019.

== Gameplay ==
Gameplay screenshot; Nymn is running across a bridge powered by a contraption

In Tanglewood, the player controls a fox-like creature named Nymn and later plays as another fox-like creature called Echo. The player must complete puzzles and avoid enemies to survive the night. Gamers can control Nymn to run, jump, push objects and use temporary powers granted by fuzzls.

=== Interactive objects ===
Fuzzls are mysterious fuzzy balls of unknown origin that are a part of most puzzles. If one pushes them to their nest, they temporarily grant the player different powers depending on the fuzzl's color; yellow bestows gliding faculties, green allows time manipulation, and blue grants the ability to tame large beasts called djakks. When the power is gone, the player can return to the fuzzl's location to reacquire it. Later in the game, the player is introduced to red fuzzls that can charge machines. During the final boss, larger white fuzzls give the player the ability to damage any enemy on screen but must wait between activations.

In addition to fuzzls, the player can push boulders, crates, and logs to get through levels. Logs are unique as they can also be rolled on.

Flues can launch the player's character into the air if the player jumps into them. Mushrooms give the player a boost as well. If the player jumps on top of the mushroom, the character will bounce higher.

The player can use contraptions powered by red fuzzls to their advantage. Most contraptions are connected to buttons that must be held down for the player to advance. Gamers can either push an object on top of the button or slow down time using the green fuzzls's ability.

Checkpoint totems will glow Nymn's color when the player passes them. The player will respawn at the last checkpoint activated if they die.

=== Secrets and collectibles ===
In each act, except in the last chapter, there are eight collectible fireflies. Some are easily found on the main path but others are hidden and require exploration to locate. If the player collects all 168 fireflies, an alternate ending is unlocked. In the pause menu, there are two firefly counters: one displays the number of fireflies collected in the current act and the other shows the collected fireflies across the whole game. The director's cut is planned to include more secrets and collectibles, including unlockable artwork.

=== Enemies and bosses ===
There are several enemies in Tanglewood. As the day progresses, the game becomes more difficult.

A scirus is a squirrel-like creature that will run away from Nymn but will threaten him if cornered. If the player gets too close, it will attack. Hoggs will chase Nymn and attempt to impale him with its horn. If the player tricks a hogg into running into a wall, its horn will get stuck to it temporarily. Fish-like creatures will swim towards Nymn if he is on their horizontal axis. They cannot swim vertically. The most common enemy in the game is the djakk. In the game, djakks are giant hunting pets whose masters disappeared thousands of years ago. Djakks chase Nymn in an attempt to eat him but are unable to jump. The player can kill djakks by pushing a boulder onto their heads or making them run into spikes. Djakks will try to bite Nymn if they are close but the player can outrun the bite if Nymn runs at full speed. The player can tame djakks using the blue fuzzls's ability and ride them temporarily. After taming a djakk, the player can get across larger gaps that are normally inaccessible. Elders are djakks who lived for nearly 1,000 years. In the game, they were left in their cages when their masters passed away leading to their desperation for food. As a result, Elders run faster than normal djakks. Elders only appear in the third chapter.

There is a midpoint boss in the fourth chapter where the player must fight Borgus who is the last of its species, the djermisch. To defeat Borgus, the player should push a boulder onto a contraption, move it to the platforms above, push it on top of Borgus, and repeat until victorious. The main villain in the game is an unnamed demon. The developer, Matt Phillips, never named it and prefers to refer to it as a demon. The final boss takes place during the final chapter. After obtaining a white fuzzl's power, Echo fights the demon. To beat game, the player must use the white fuzzl's power to damage the demon, avoid it after it turns into an orb, and repeat until the demon is defeated.

The planned director's cut promises to include more bosses than the original game.

=== Password system ===
Tanglewood uses a password system to save games. The player's password is displayed when the game is paused. On the Genesis/MD version, the player manually enters the password and starts at the beginning of the act. On the Steam version, the game automatically saves the password and starts at the last checkpoint activated.

=== Level select ===
After the credits roll, the player will be sent back to the title screen and a level select option will be unlocked. This allows them to start at any chapter desired. The level selection can also be accessed without beating the game. During the game's beginning sequence, if the player holds the Start button and moves the fuzzl towards the djakk, then the fuzzl will be eaten. This activates the game's cheat mode which is indicated by a red fuzzl cursor. Entering the sound test and selecting the sound effects 19, 65, 9 and 17 in that order will unlock the level selection option.

== Plot ==
Screenshot of the first cutscene. It shows the demon smiling at Nymn while he's sleeping.

Tanglewood opens with a cutscene showing Nymn sleeping in a nest in a forest tree. An orb floats in, transforms into a demon, smiles at Nymn, reverts to an orb, and then floats away. Nymn wakes up but sees nothing untoward and goes back to sleep.

For the first few levels, Nymn makes his way through the forest, surviving its many hazards.

At the end of the third chapter, Nymn finds another fox-like creature named Echo hiding from a djakk. After killing the djakk, Nymn approaches Echo, who jumps toward Nymn and howls with relief. Echo begins following Nymn.

At the end of the fifth chapter, the orb returns. It floats in front of Nymn and Echo. Echo is scared and curls up into a ball. The orb transforms into the demon and kills Nymn. The player now controls Echo, who must continue alone.

The ending depends on whether the player collects every firefly. If they do not, then Echo defeats the demon, arrives at Nymn's nest, and sleeps alone. If the player does collect every firefly, then Nymn returns to save Echo from certain death halfway through the fight with the demon. Once the demon is defeated, Echo and Nymn return to Nymn's nest and go to sleep.

Tanglewood: Definitive Edition plans to include additional lore to the game's plot.

== Development ==
Matt Phillips programmed the entire game in 68000 assembly language using original Sega development tools and processes from the 1990s with his own engine. The game was initially developed under the name "Project Watershed". Seven development video logs on YouTube presented game engine creation progress between December 2014 and January 2015. The third video shows a ledge grabbing mechanic that is not present in the final game. It took about five to six years to finish the game.

== Music ==
All of Tanglewood's music and most of its sound effects were composed by Nathan Stanley under the name freezedream. The artist had previously made Genesis/MD music like his 2010 album Today released on cartridge. The first track in the album, "Winter in July", shares similarities to the song "Deadwood" used in Tanglewood at the beginning of the sixth chapter. A short version of the song "Rain" from the freezedream album Sonic Traces was used at the end of the first chapter.

There is a Tanglewood OST cartridge that includes every track in the game and a new track called "Tanglewood (Reprise)". It also plays the full version of "Rain" instead of the short version used in the game.

There are a total of 26 tracks from the official soundtrack though some are short jingles.

The game uses the Echo Sound Driver, which is a Genesis/MD sound engine.

== Reception ==
Reception

Aggregate score
Aggregator	Score
Metacritic	(PC) 79/100

Review scores
Publication	Score
Retro Gamer	(SMD) 79%
VideoGamer.com	(SMD) 7/10
Gamereactor	(PC) 7/10
Sega-16	(SMD) 9/10

Review aggregator website Metacritic states that Tanglewood has received generally favorable scores from critics on PC.

=== Awards ===
Tanglewood won the 2018 Development World Championship's Fan Favorite Award, the 2018 Revival Retro's Best Indie Game of Show Award, and the 2018 Euskal Encounter's Retrotalents award. Tanglewood was also a finalist for the 2018 Develop Conference's Indie Showcase award.
