= Mappy Kids =

1989 video game

- Developer: Namco
- Publisher: Namco
- Composer: Atsuko Iwanaga
- Series: Mappy
- Platform: Family Computer
- Release: JP: December 22, 1989
- Genre: Platform
- Modes: Single-player, multiplayer

Mappy Kids (Note: Japanese: マッピーキッズ, Hepburn: Mappī Kizzu) is a 1989 platform video game developed and published by Namco for the Family Computer. It is a sequel to the 1983 video game Mappy. It was released in Japan on December 22, 1989.

== Plot ==
The player controls the son of Mappy named Happy who wants to marry Picky. However, she will not marry him unless he has a house, which Happy doesn't have. Mappy encourages him to travel through Mappyland and collect money and valuables so he can build his house. At the end of each level, there is a slot machine. Pulling the lever to the slot machine may allow the player to earn extra lives, items, gain or lose money. To receive it, the player must win a mini game first. After the mini-games, players access a shop, where they can buy various things with the money that they find during the game.

== Gameplay ==
The game is a 2D platformer, where the player must reach the end of the levels while avoiding various obstacles and enemies. The character is controlled with two buttons: a jump button and an attack button. While in mid-air, repeatedly pressing the jump button will make the character briefly hover and slow its descent. The attack button (a short-ranged kick) can be used to defeat enemies, open treasure chests, or remove breakable blocks.

The player can find various collectibles inside the levels. Most of them are treasures (either 100-Yen coins found on the overworld or more valuable items found inside some chests) which increase the players wealth and can be spent in a shop at the end of each level on various furnitures to embellish the character's home. The other chest items are power-ups which can either give the player a temporary speed boost, temporary invincibility, an extra life, or retrieve some health.

The player possesses a health bar and a set amount of lives. If the character is hit, it will lose a hit point, be sent rolling backward a sizable amount and will lose a bag of money (that can be retrieved). When the character's health reaches 0, the player loses a life and is sent back at the beginning of the level. When the player has no more lives, the game is over.

The game also contains a competitive 2-player mode, where Happy and his twin brother Rappy have to compete to get the better house by taking more money than the other. The brothers also compete in the minigames like in the first player mode, where Rappy replaces the Meowkies. Whoever has the better house wins the heart of Picky

== Reception ==
Reception

Review score
Publication	Score
Famitsu	6/10, 7/10, 8/10, 5/10

== Legacy ==
Mappy Kids was released on the Namco Museum Collection 1 cartridge for the Evercade in 2020 and received an official English translation. It was one of the few games that were released through Mappy franchise.
