= Splatterhouse 2 =

1992 video game

- European box art
- Developer: Now Production
- Publisher: Namco
- Director: 100 Taro
- Producer: Papaya Payapaya
- Programmer: Haruo Ohori
- Artists: A. Chan; Gyoee~! Miyachan; Taiji Nagayama
- Composer: Eiko Kaneda
- Series: Splatterhouse
- Platform: Sega Genesis
- Release: NA: July 1992; JP: August 4, 1992; EU: October 7, 1992
- Genre: Beat 'em up
- Mode: Single-player

Splatterhouse 2, known in Japan as Splatterhouse Part 2 (Note: Japanese: スプラッターハウス PART 2, Hepburn: Supurattāhausu PART 2), is a 1992 beat 'em up video game developed by Now Production and published by Namco for the Sega Genesis. It is the sequel to the 1988 arcade game Splatterhouse, and the third installment in the Splatterhouse series, following Splatterhouse: Wanpaku Graffiti.

On August 4, 2008, the game was released on the Wii Virtual Console in North America. It is the first and the only ESRB M-rated game to be released for the Virtual Console. The game was included as an unlockable extra in the 2010 remake. It was included on the Sega Genesis Mini 2 in October 2022.

== Gameplay and premise ==
Gameplay

Three months have gone by since the events of the first game. Rick is still suffering from his guilt of being unable to save Jennifer and has been plagued by nightmares of her and the Terror Mask, which reformed after breaking at the climax of the first game. Suddenly, the mask reappears to Rick and tempts him to find the house, telling him that Jennifer can be saved. It closes by telling Rick that it will give him power. Rick succeeds in rescuing Jennifer, and the House sinks into the bottom of the river.

Splatterhouse 2 features gameplay very similar to the first game. The player controls Rick through eight different stages, each two-dimensional. Rick's attacks remain largely unchanged, able to punch, kick, jump kick, and slide kick, as well as use several weapons scattered throughout the levels. Each level features a boss at the end, often a grotesque monster. New additions to the gameplay include a difficulty setting and a password system for the English version (the Japanese version lacks a password feature), taken from Splatterhouse: Wanpaku Graffiti.

== Regional differences ==
In the western versions of the game, the design of the Terror Mask is skull-like. In the Japanese version, the mask is white with black stripes over each eye, causing it to loosely resemble a kabuki mask. Due to the translation when the game was localized, some elements are clearer in the Japanese version. In it, the Mask instructs Rick to "find the hidden house" and that Jennifer is in "the land of the dead". In the western version, the Mask instructs Rick to "go back to the house" and does not specify where Jennifer is. This has caused some confusion among players that have not played the original Japanese version, with several believing that the intact mansion in the second game is the West Mansion from the original Splatterhouse, when in fact the charred ruins that make up the first stage are what is left of West Mansion (these ruins can also be clearly seen in the opening of the game, before the screen scrolls over to reveal the other mansion, aka the "hidden house").

== Reception ==
Reception

Review scores
Publication	Score
Game Informer	9/10
GamePro	5/5
Mega Play	26/40
Mega Action	88%
Sega Force	63%
VG&CE	6/10

Game Informer praised the game, saying that Splatterhouse 2 was "definitely one not to pass up." Abby Normal of GamePro stated: "If you've ever wanted to seek revenge on all those early childhood closet monsters, now's your chance to do it vicariously through Splatterhouse 2."

Many were quick to point out that a great premise wasn't enough to carry a game. Sega Force called the controls "sluggish" and suggests the game gameplay "lets the whole game down." Video Games & Computer Entertainment agreed, arguing that "Splatterhouse 2 does nothing to advance the genre." Mean Machines Sega also noted the poor graphics and short single-player campaign. Mega Action gave an overall score of 88% calling the game a "Sick, Slick scrolling beat-‘em-up." The four reviewers of Mega Play gave positive reviews noting the blood and gore gameplay being one of the best points of the game and felt the game would appeal to horror movie fans. They criticized the game's controls, the lack of new features and repetitive gameplay.

Upon reviewing the game for its Virtual Console release, Lucas Thomas of IGN noted that he was largely unimpressed with the game's lack of innovation, ultimately giving it a 5.5 out of 10. While he praised the game's continuation of its gory presentation, he wrote that "While Splatterhouse 2 is even more violent and replete with even more disturbing images, the shock value is largely gone. We've seen it all before".
