= Dorke and Ymp =

2015 video game

- Developers: Norse; Piko Interactive
- Publisher: Piko Interactive
- Platform: Super Nintendo Entertainment System
- Release: 2015
- Genre: Platform
- Mode: Single-player

Dorke and Ymp is a 2015 platform video game developed and published by Piko Interactive for the Super Nintendo Entertainment System. Initially developed in the 1990s by Swedish developer Norse as an unlicensed game for the system, it failed to find a publisher and was cancelled despite nearing completion. Piko Interactive purchased the rights to the game as well as a prototype from its original developers; after artist Jim Studt's passing, Piko redeveloped the game and added new content in his honor, releasing the game as a cartridge and on Windows in 2015.

== Gameplay ==
The player controls Dorke and Ymp, characters who are sent to do errands for an evil wizard across various levels. Dorke navigates levels on foot while Ymp can attack by spitting. Items such as bombs can be collected to bypass obstacles. After the end of each world, a boss character must be fought and defeated.
