= Splatterhouse: Wanpaku Graffiti =

1989 video game

- Developer: Now Production
- Publisher: Namco
- Designers: Taiji Nagayama; Bishibashi Haro
- Programmers: Nobuyuki Shinohara; Myt Juso
- Artists: Taiji Nagayaam; Juncha; Baguchan; Hidebou
- Composers: Anna Puruna; Masakatsu Maekawa
- Series: Splatterhouse
- Platform: Famicom
- Release: JP: July 31, 1989
- Genres: Action, platform
- Mode: Single player

Splatterhouse: Wanpaku Graffiti (Note: Japanese: スプラッターハウス わんぱくグラフィティ, Hepburn: Supurattāhausu: Wanpaku Gurafiti; "Splatterhouse: Naughty Graffiti") is a 1989 action-platform video game developed by Now Production and published by Namco for the Family Computer. It was originally released only in Japan, although it saw a localized Western release in 2020 as part of the Namco Museum Archives Vol. 1 compilation. It is the second game in the Splatterhouse series, and the first to be released for a home console. The game is a parody of the original Splatterhouse, and takes a comical approach to its presentation, featuring super deformed characters as well as parodies of horror films and other pop culture references related to the genre.

== Gameplay ==
Rick faces the boss of the first level, a Michael Jackson inspired vampire.

Unlike the other Splatterhouse games, Wanpaku Graffiti focuses more on platforming elements than beat 'em up gameplay. Instead of using punches and kicks, Rick wields an axe and can pick up a shotgun with limited ammo during certain levels. This game also features an experience point system. By defeating a certain number of enemies, Rick's health bar grows. The number of enemies needed is seen at the top of the screen. New to the series is the password system, which allows players to enter stages through four digit numbers.

If both of the crystal orbs are collected during the game, a shot at the end with Rick and Jennifer approaching the West Mansion like in the original Splatterhouse will be revealed. The ending would suggest that Rick was possibly dreaming all the events of this game when he is seen on the hill with Jennifer. The dream may have been a warning about what was going to happen in the West Mansion in the next game.

== Plot ==
Wanpaku Graffiti opens as Jennifer weeps over Rick's grave. Lightning strikes, hitting the grave and reviving Rick, who has been wearing a mask. Lightning strikes again, hitting the grave next to Rick's and revives the Pumpkin King, the game's main antagonist. The Pumpkin King kidnaps Jennifer and Rick must go save her.

After fighting through several levels of super deformed monster parodies, Rick finds himself in the office of the Pumpkin King. Upon defeating him, it is revealed to the player that the whole game was merely a movie. A director congratulates Rick on his fine acting, Rick removes his mask, and they leave. Once everyone has left, the mask comes to life, revealing it is not what it seems. If the two crystal balls are collected, there is an extended epilogue. One crystal ball contains a picture of Rick lying on top a hill with Jennifer, stating that they live happily ever after. The second crystal ball has a glimpse of Rick looking uncertain as Jennifer excitedly approaches what appears to be West Mansion during a storm, ominously stating that they will face a crisis. This may imply that Wanpaku Graffiti was intended to be a prequel to the original game.

== Reception ==
JC Fletcher of Joystiq.com reviewed the game in the "Virtually Overlooked" column, devoted to games that should appear on the Wii's Virtual Console. Fletcher praised the game's graphics and parody elements, writing "Splatterhouse wasn't the most deadly serious game, but it was bloody enough to be shocking...How would you follow up a game like that?" Fletcher went on to say that "parody remakes" are missed in the video game industry. Overall, critics of the game have deemed its graphics, control, and parody nature Wanpaku Graffiti's strongest aspects.
