= Smashing Drive =

2000 video game

- Developers: Gaelco (arcade); Point of View (GC, Xbox); Raylight Studios (GBA)
- Publishers: Gaelco (arcade); Namco Hometek (GC, Xbox); Zoo Digital Publishing (GBA)
- Designer: Xavi Arrebola G.
- Composers: Joan Sanmarti (arcade, GC, Xbox); Tomas Lorenzo (arcade, GC, Xbox); Gianni Ricciardi (GBA)
- Engine: Blue Roses (GBA)
- Platforms: Arcade, GameCube, Xbox, Game Boy Advance
- Release: Arcade: NA: 2000; GameCube: NA: 2002; Xbox: NA: 2002; Game Boy Advance: NA: 2004; PAL: 2005
- Genre: Racing
- Modes: Single-player, multiplayer
- Arcade system: Gaelco PowerVR Hardware

Smashing Drive is a racing video game developed and published by Gaelco and distributed by Namco. The game was released in arcades in 2000 and was ported to the GameCube and Xbox in 2002 by Point of View and Game Boy Advance in 2004 by DSI Games and Namco.

== Gameplay ==
The player races against time and another psychotic cab driver delivering passengers across New York City to earn money. The game is divided into four difficulties, each of which contains three different levels (with the exception of "Dusk and Wired", which only contains one). If the player manages to beat the rival cab in all three levels of a difficulty, they are taken to a bonus stage with the only available route being all of the Risky Routes. At the end of a stage, the player's score is based on the amount of time it took to reach the destination, the cab's condition, the rival being beaten, the number of Turbo powerups obtained, and the number of Risky Routes traversed. Unlike many racing games, the horn actually has a functional use of making (most) mobile vehicles move aside before it wears out unless if Repaired. If the player runs out of time before completing the stage, they encounter a continue screen. A 10-second countdown will be then given to the player if they wish to try again. After it expires, the game is over. However, on the console version's Head-to-Head mode, there is no continue feature. After time runs out, the game automatically ends.

== Reception ==
Reception

Aggregate score
Aggregator	Score			
Aggregator	Arcade	GBA	GameCube	Xbox
Metacritic	N/A	65/100	47/100	42/100

Review scores
Publication	Score			
Publication	Arcade	GBA	GameCube	Xbox
AllGame	3/5	N/A	2/5	N/A
Edge	N/A	N/A	3/10	N/A
Electronic Gaming Monthly	N/A	N/A	5.67/10 (Note: Two critics of Electronic Gaming Monthly gave the GameCube version each a score of 5.5/10, and the other gave it 6/10.)	5.5/10
EP Daily	N/A	N/A	4/10	N/A
Game Informer	N/A	N/A	7/10	6.5/10
GameSpot	N/A	6.1/10	3.5/10	3.5/10
GameSpy	N/A	N/A	35%	N/A
GameZone	N/A	N/A	6.5/10	N/A
IGN	N/A	N/A	3.4/10	3.3/10
Nintendo Power	N/A	2.6/5	3.6/5	N/A
Nintendo World Report	N/A	N/A	4/10	N/A
Official Xbox Magazine (US)	N/A	N/A	N/A	5/10

The Game Boy Advance version received "mixed" reviews, while the GameCube and Xbox versions received "unfavorable" reviews, according to the review aggregation website Metacritic.

Jon Thompson of AllGame said of the arcade version, "The visuals of Smashing Drive are certainly decent, although they can't qualify as top-notch in this day and age." Thompson also wrote, "It isn't the most amazing racer ever made, but it has enough interesting ideas and strong enough execution to make it something different in the arcade world. It's tough, it's attractive, and overall, it's fun." Scott Alan Marriott later said of the GameCube version, "Namco's history of delivering feature packed arcade ports to home consoles comes crashing to a halt with Smashing Drive [...]. Smashing Drive was probably not an easy game to port due to so much happening on the screen, and to its credit, the game never bogs down. Unfortunately, the darn thing never speeds up either, so each race feels like it takes place underwater. The graphics are colorful but simple, lacking the detailed textures expected from a GameCube title. [...] Succeeding in Smashing Drive is a simple matter of memorizing the courses, knowing where each turbo is located, and learning the best shortcuts. Once that's done, there's very little replay value."

Fran Mirabella III of IGN said of the GameCube version, "The only added benefit [from the arcade version] is multiplayer, and that also dries up speedily. Smashing Drive is a neat concept, but fails pretty miserably in execution. It's just far too linear to offer up any compelling gameplay. There are no permanent upgrades for your cab, no cars to unlock, and only one final bonus destination to surprise you." Mirabella called the soundtrack, "Definitely one of the most god-awful soundtracks ever created. The collection of about four or five songs is downright nauseating. [...] We've asked ourselves if anyone could actually like this music. Even the composer -- dare we call them that -- would have to be somewhat crazed to think he/she created something anyone would want to listen to." Mirabella also criticized the game's outdated graphics, and concluded that "after about a half-hour or so I had nearly beaten the game and found most of the shortcuts. It's an arcade game port. It's not a title I feel is made for the home console market." Aaron Boulding criticized the Xbox version for not taking advantage of the console's graphical capability. Boulding also criticized the game's animation, writing, "When you do see pedestrians scurrying out of the way, they look like tiny flat action figures waddling to safety." Boulding also said the game included the, "Worst soundtrack ever", calling it "pure synthesized, acid-washed crap." Boulding also wrote, "The crashes and other sound effects aren't very effective and the attempt at surround sound is laughable."

Gerald Villoria of GameSpot criticized the GameCube version's graphics and generic sound effects, and wrote that "the worst culprit is the game's music, which is just as disappointing as the game's short life span. There are three grungy garage rock songs in total, and all three are of absolutely abysmal production value. A single song loops every 30 seconds or so for each level--listening to the same horrible song over and over again for 20 minutes will practically be enough to drive you mad." Villoria also said "few players will get more than a couple of hours' worth of enjoyment out of the home version." Villoria said the Xbox version "essentially shares all the failings displayed in the GameCube port". Frank Provo said in his review of the Game Boy Advance version, "for a variety of reasons, it doesn't seem like such a bad game" in comparison to the GameCube and Xbox versions, despite duplicating the same "look and feel". Provo said, "Nothing about the music or sound effects is particularly noteworthy [...]. And while the vocal lyrics within the game's music clips are unique, they're not exactly spicy or memorable." Provo concluded that it "isn't a great racing game, and it certainly won't eat up weeks of your time, but it is fine for what it is: a simple, graphically impressive racer that can be played in short bursts." Provo also noted in his review, "As an arcade game, Smashing Drive was something of a laughing stock. Apart from the fact that it was a restrictive knockoff of Sega's Crazy Taxi, albeit with weapons, the ancient polygon graphics looked like they were rendered on whatever home video game console was popular in 1996--which wasn't so flattering for an arcade game that was produced in 2000."

Fennec Fox of GamePro said of the GameCube version, "The trouble is that, unlike in Crazy Taxi, there's very little to actually do. Sure, there are a fair amount of graphical gimmicks (you can bash through basketball arenas and up a skyscraper), but nowhere near enough. You can see everything the game has to offer in an hour or two, and similarly, the two-player split-screen mode gets boring very quickly." (Note: GamePro gave the GameCube version three 2.5/5 scores for graphics, control, and fun factor, and 3/5 for sound.)

The GameCube and Xbox versions were nominated for the "Worst Game on GameCube" and "Worst Game on Xbox" awards at GameSpot's Best and Worst of 2002 Awards, both of which went to Jeremy McGrath Supercross World and Gravity Games Bike: Street Vert Dirt, respectively.
