= Gaelco =

Spanish video game company

Gaelco, S.A.
- Type: Sociedad Anónima
- Industry: Video game
- Founded: October 1985; 40 years ago
- Founder: Luis Jonama; Josep Quinglés; Javier Valero
- Headquarters: Barcelona, Spain
- Products: Arcade and video games (as "Gaelco"); Electronic dartboards (as "Gaelco Darts")
- Website: www.gaelco.es

Gabinete Electrónico Consultivo, S.A. (which translates to Electronic Consultative Cabinet), but is trademarked and better known as Gaelco, S.A., is a Spanish company that develops and publishes arcade games and video games. As of 2007, Gaelco develops electronic dart machines under the name of "Gaelco Darts".

== List of Gaelco games ==
=== For Arcade ===
Title	A.k.a. title	In-house developing	Third-party developing	Year	Notes
Xor World		Yes	No	1990	Prototype only.
Master Boy		Yes	No	1987	A remastered version was released in 1991.
Big Karnak		Yes	No	1991	
Splash!		No	OMK	1992	Distributed by Leprechaun in the U.S. with the title Painted Lady.
Squash		Yes	No	1992	
Thunder Hoop		Yes	No	1992	
World Rally Championship		No	Zigurat Software	1993	Distributed by Atari Games in the U.S. and Sigma in Japan.
Glass		No	OMK	1993	
Alligator Hunt		Yes	No	1994	
Target Hits		No	Zigurat Software	1994	
TH Strikes Back	Thunder Hoop 2	Yes	No	1994	
Biomechanical Toy		No	Zeus Software	1995	Its prototype was developed in the same year as Bioplaything Cop.
Last KM		No	Zeus Software	1995	Unreleased title.
Touch and Go		Yes	No	1995	
World Rally 2: Twin Racing		No	Zigurat Software	1995	
Maniac Square		Yes	No	1996	Its prototype was developed in 1992.
Snow Board Championship		No	OMK	1996	Distributed by Namco America in the U.S..
Speed Up		Yes	No	1996	First 3D Gaelco arcade game. Distributed by Namco America in the U.S..
Surf Planet		No	Zigurat Software	1997	Distributed by Atari Games in the U.S..
Salter Cardioline Pro Cycle	Pro Tele Cardioline (Salter Fitness Bike)	No	OMK	1997	Fitness machine, developed on behalf of Salter.
Salter Cardioline Pro Stepper	Pro Tele Cardioline (Salter Fitness Stepper)	No	OMK	1997	Fitness machine, developed on behalf of Salter.
Radikal Bikers		Yes	No	1998	Distributed by Atari Games in the U.S. and SNK in Japan.
Bang!		No	Bit Managers	1998	Distributed by GM Shoji in Japan with the title Gun Gabacho.
Rolling Extreme	ROLLing eX.tre.me (Street Luge)	Yes	No	1999	Distributed by Namco America in the U.S..
Football Power		No	Zigurat Software	2000	Distributed by Namco America in the U.S..
Smashing Drive	Smashing Drive NYC - IIxM	Yes	No	2000	Distributed by Namco America in the U.S..
ATV Track	ATV Track: Quads on Amazon	Yes	No	2002	Distributed by Namco America in the U.S..
Gaelco Football		No	Zigurat Software	2002	
Tokyo Cop	TOKYO COP Special Police Reinforcement	Yes	No	2003	Distributed by Namco America in the U.S. and Namco in Japan.
Ring Riders		Yes	No	2004	Distributed by Namco America in the U.S..
Tuning Race	Gaelco Championship TUNING RACE	Yes	No	2005	Last arcade game released by Gaelco. Distributed by Global VR in the U.S..
Radikal Bikers II		Yes	No	TBD	Sequel of Radikal Bikers, concept never developed.

=== Home versions ===
==== Developed ====
- PC Fútbol 2005 (2004: Windows)
- PC Fútbol 2006 (2005: Windows)
- PC Fútbol 2007 (2006: Windows)

==== Published ====
- Radikal Bikers (1999: PlayStation)
- Smashing Drive (2002: GameCube, Xbox; 2004/2005: Game Boy Advance)

==== Compilation releases ====
A compilation cartridge named "Gaelco Arcade 1" was released for Evercade in December 2021, featuring Alligator Hunt, Biomechanical Toy, Glass, Snow Board Championship, Thunder Hoop and World Rally.
