= Splatterhouse 3 =

1993 video game

- Box art by Julie Bell
- Developer: Now Production
- Publisher: Namco
- Director: Taiji Nagayama
- Producers: Masami Shimotsuma; Papaya Payapaya
- Designer: Masami Shimotsuma
- Programmer: Haruo Ohori
- Artists: Gyoee! Miyazaki; Takashi Yoshida
- Composer: Eiko Kaneda
- Series: Splatterhouse
- Platform: Sega Genesis
- Release: JP: March 19, 1993; NA: August 1993
- Genre: Beat 'em up
- Mode: Single-player

Splatterhouse 3 (stylized as SPLATTERHOUSE • 3), known in Japan as Splatterhouse Part 3, (Note: Japanese: スプラッターハウスPART3, Hepburn: Supurattāhausu PART 3) is a 1993 beat 'em up video game developed by Now Production and published by Namco for the Sega Genesis. It is the sequel to Splatterhouse 2 and was one of the first games to be given a rating by Sega's own Videogame Rating Council. In North America the game was given an MA-13 rating by the council for its graphic violence and gore. Unlike its predecessors, it was not originally released in Europe. The game was included as an unlockable extra in the 2010 remake, with new artwork replacing the digitized photographs for legal reasons.

== Gameplay ==
The game features six levels, many taking place in the mansion. Instead of the side-scrolling action of the previous games, Splatterhouse 3 features non-linear exploration throughout several different rooms, forcing Rick to often backtrack as he tries to find the exit. Players are given a map of each level. Each level must be cleared in a certain amount of time. Although this does not affect gameplay, running out of time results in changes in the plot, creating four possible endings. By running out of time, for example, Jennifer will be killed in the second level. New to Splatterhouse is the Power Meter, which can be filled by collecting Eldritch Orbs found throughout levels and occasionally are dropped by defeated enemies. Once the bar is filled by at least one orb, the player can transform Rick into a hulking and more monstrous version of himself with the Terror Mask being seemingly fused to his head. In this state, Rick is significantly stronger and can execute a special attack that involves pieces of his flesh extending from his chest area and acting as a weapon, injuring any monster in the vicinity of their reach. Also, instead of actually wielding the weapons he finds, the mutated version of Rick simply flings them at enemies, dealing a fair bit more damage than swinging the weapons as normal Rick would have.

Extra lives and health items are also scattered throughout the levels. Passwords are also given to players to return to levels. Occasionally, Rick is able to pick up weapons (e.g. a baseball bat or a cleaver, among others) to use against the monsters. Once you defeat all the monsters in the room an in-game map appears to give you some choice in how you get to the end of each level. The game's storyline alters significantly if you fail to finish levels before the allotted time runs out. For example; in the second level you are tasked with saving Rick's wife Jennifer from being devoured by a boreworm. In order to save her, you must reach the end of the level to confront and defeat the boreworm within the time limit. Failing to do so before the time runs out will result in Jennifer being devoured internally by the boreworm planted inside of her body.

== Plot ==
The game takes place about five years after the events of Splatterhouse 2. Rick and Jennifer have since married and have a son named David. Rick has also become successful on Wall Street and has bought a mansion in Connecticut, putting the memories of the Terror Mask behind him. Meanwhile, the Mask feels the ancient energy that it recalls from ages past and begins to speak to Rick. Rick must don the mask for the third time and fight the monsters that have invaded his mansion. Rick first fights to save Jennifer, who has been kidnapped by an entity known as the Evil One, but it is revealed this was only a distraction while the Evil One took David.

Rick eventually defeats the Evil One, who had planned to use David's latent psychic abilities to unlock the power of an object known as the Dark Stone. Upon defeating the Evil One, the Mask reveals its true, evil intentions. Rick must then destroy the Terror Mask permanently.

=== Endings ===
There are four possible endings, depending on if the player saves Jennifer and David, saves one or the other, or fails to save them both. All but the best ending start out with the Mask saying it will continue to exist as long as there is human suffering, and as it shatters, it says that the sky has cleared, and evil has once again been banished. The endings are as follows.

Bad Ending (both died): If Rick fails to save both his wife and child, the ending goes as usual, but it states that Rick "stands alone, the weight of failure hanging heavily on him". It then shows a picture of him and his family, with the words "Alone. All alone..."

Jennifer Dies or turns into a Mindless Beast but David is Alive: If Rick fails to save Jennifer or she turned into a mindless beast, but rescues David, it shows the ending as normal, but that Jennifer "exists only as a memory". It then shows David asking his dad where his mother is, and fades after that.

David Dies but Jennifer is Alive: If Jennifer is rescued, but David dies, the ending goes on as usual, but with David "being only a memory". Jennifer then asks Rick where David is, and after being told (though the dialog isn't shown), she cries out "no".

Good Ending (both alive): Should both survive, the ending is different. Apart from a more pleasant tune, the Mask's dialog changes. Instead of saying that it will survive, it cries out "Can't see... can't hear... I'm dying...!!" before shattering. The ending then continues as normal, saying Rick returns to his family, finally free from the Terror Mask for good.

== Reception ==
Reception

Review scores
Publication	Score
AllGame	4/5
Mega Action	85%

In his review of Splatterhouse 3, Russ Ceccola of Fangoria wrote that, "The appeal of the Splatterhouse games is the bloody violence. Its graphics are explicit and gross, but in an over-the-top way"; Ceccola concluded: "Splatterhouse 3 adds more play elements in the form of a map, time limits and multiple endings, but it all boils down to cartoon violence taken to the extreme." AllGame editor Geoffrey Douglas Smith praised Splatterhouse 3, stating that the game "stands at the top of the beat-'em-up heap on Genesis. A fun and gory ride with plenty of enemies to pummel and a solid game engine makes this a blast to play."
