= Evercade =

Handheld game console

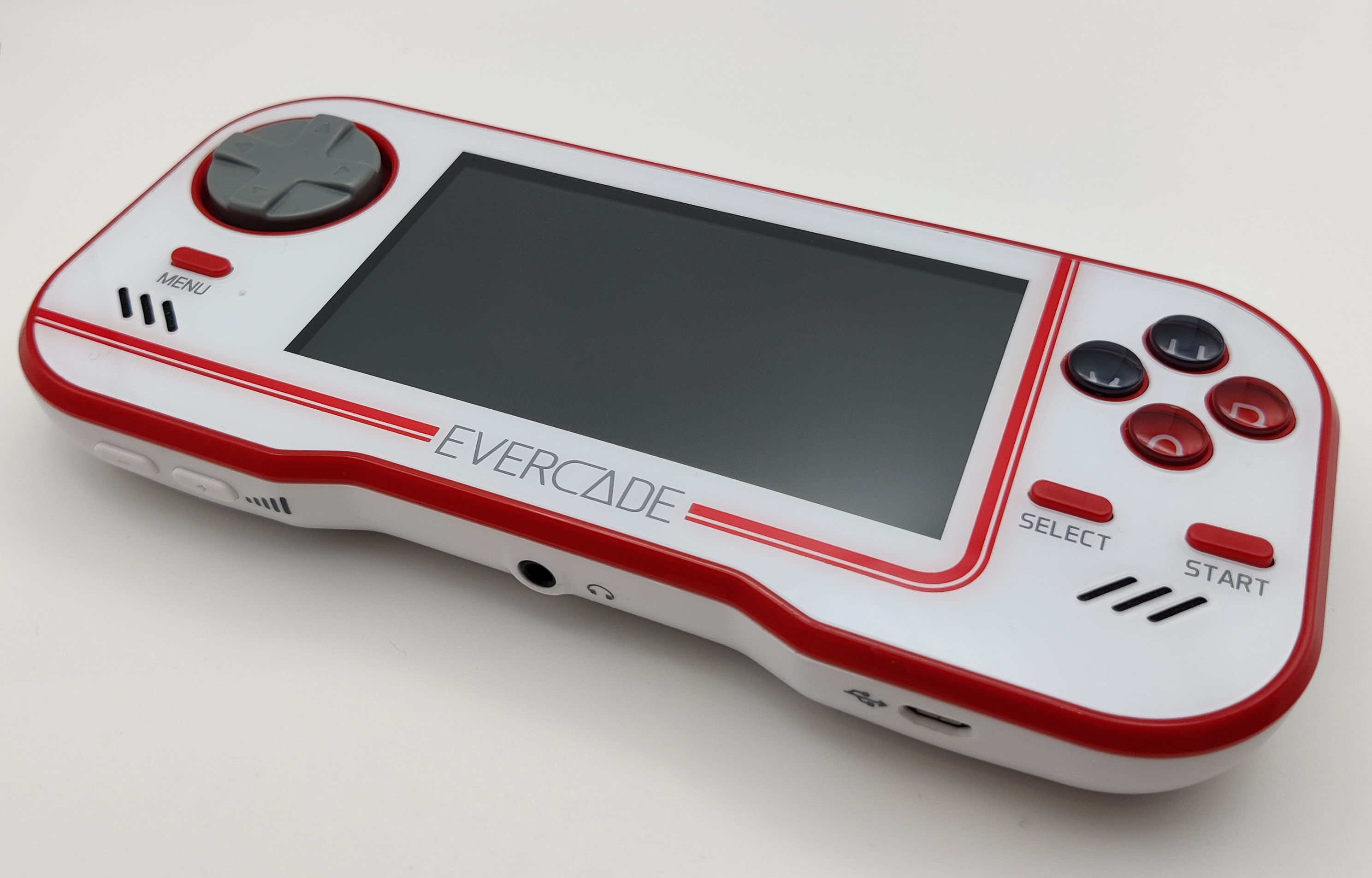
- Developer: Blaze Entertainment
- Manufacturer: Blaze Entertainment
- Type: Handheld game console
- Generation: Eighth
- Released: WW: 22 May 2020
- Introductory price: £60/$80 (basic) £80/$100 (premium)
- Discontinued: Yes
- Media: Flash game cartridge
- CPU: 1.2GHz Cortex-A7
- Memory: 256 MB
- Display: Horizontal 4.3-inch LCD screen, 480×272 pixels
- Power: 2,000-mAh rechargeable battery
- Successor: Evercade VS
- Website: evercade.co.uk

The Evercade is a handheld game console developed and manufactured by British company Blaze Entertainment. It focuses on retro gaming with flash memory based game cartridges that each contain a number of emulated games. The Evercade was released on 22 May 2020, and upon its launch, it offered 10 game cartridges with a combined total of 122 games.

Arc System Works, Atari, Bandai Namco Entertainment, G-Mode, Interplay Entertainment and Piko Interactive have released emulated versions of their games for the Evercade. Pre-existing homebrew games have also been re-released on the system by Mega Cat Studios. The Evercade is capable of playing games originally released for the Atari 2600, Atari 7800, Atari Lynx, Intellivision, NES, SNES, Sega Genesis and PlayStation as well as arcade games, and home computer games for the Commodore 64, Amiga and ZX Spectrum.

A home console version, the Evercade VS, was released in December 2021. The original handheld console was discontinued and replaced with the improved Evercade EXP, released at the end of 2022.

== History ==
The Evercade was developed by Blaze Entertainment Limited of Great Britain, a company that had previously produced Atari-related products and the Game Gadget. Blaze began development of the Evercade in 2018, with the intention of creating a console superior to plug-and-play devices. The Evercade was announced in April 2019, as a portable retrogaming console with the ability to be connected to a television screen. The console would play emulated video games, with a focus on the 8-bit and 16-bit gaming eras.

The Evercade was initially scheduled to release in the fourth quarter of 2019, before being delayed to 20 March 2020. The release was later pushed back to 22 May 2020, although this was expected to be delayed up to two additional weeks in some areas because of shipping delays, caused by the COVID-19 pandemic. The console retailed for £60/$80 with a pack-in game cartridge, while a premium edition retailed for £80/$100 and included three game cartridges. The console is white and red in color, for a retro appearance like the Nintendo Famicom, although a black edition was also sold in the United Kingdom. Andrew Byatt, the Evercade's development director, hoped to sell hundreds of thousands of units within the first year.

On 31 May 2022, Blaze announced that it would discontinue the Evercade in favor of an upgraded version known as the Evercade EXP.

== Hardware ==
The Evercade has a 1.2 GHz Cortex-A7 processor, and it uses a Linux base. The Evercade is just over seven inches long, has 256 megabytes of RAM, and has a horizontal 4.3-inch LCD screen, with a resolution of 480x272 pixels. The screen uses the 16:9 aspect ratio, as some of the console's games were originally released for systems – such as the Atari Lynx – that use a wider screen ratio than 4:3. The player can switch between the two aspect ratios.

The Evercade can be connected to a television, and uses a mini-HDMI cable as opposed to a normal HDMI output. The Evercade offers a television output of 720p, and supports high-definition upscaling on all games when the console is connected to a television. The console has a rechargeable 2,000-mAh battery that lasts four to five hours. A 3.5 minijack for headphones is located on the bottom of the console, along with two volume controls. The cartridge slot, power button, and the mini-HDMI port are located on the top of the system. A MicroUSB port is used for charging the battery. Unlike modern handheld consoles, the Evercade does not have a touch screen or Wi-Fi connectivity.

Blaze Entertainment developed 20 versions of the Evercade D-pad before settling on a final version. The design is based on the D-pads featured on the Genesis and Saturn controllers. Aside from the D-pad, the console includes four action buttons on the front and two trigger buttons on top. It also has "menu", "select" and "start" buttons. The layout of the four action buttons was determined after Blaze conducted an online poll, which found that 68 percent of people wanted a layout like those used on modern game controllers. However, this created confusion, as in-game prompts never match the buttons (a player may need to press "B" when prompted to press "A"). As the console launched, Blaze released a firmware update for the layout issue, requiring the user to connect the console through USB to the Evercade website.

Two-player games converted for the Evercade retain the multiplayer function, with the intention that future hardware will allow two players. The addition of Bluetooth had been considered as a way to add multiplayer, but the development team scrapped this idea because of cost and complexity, which did not go well with the console's focus. At the end of 2019, before the Evercade's release, Blaze was already working on a second version with multiplayer capability and a possible, easier alternative for connecting the console to a television.

== Games ==
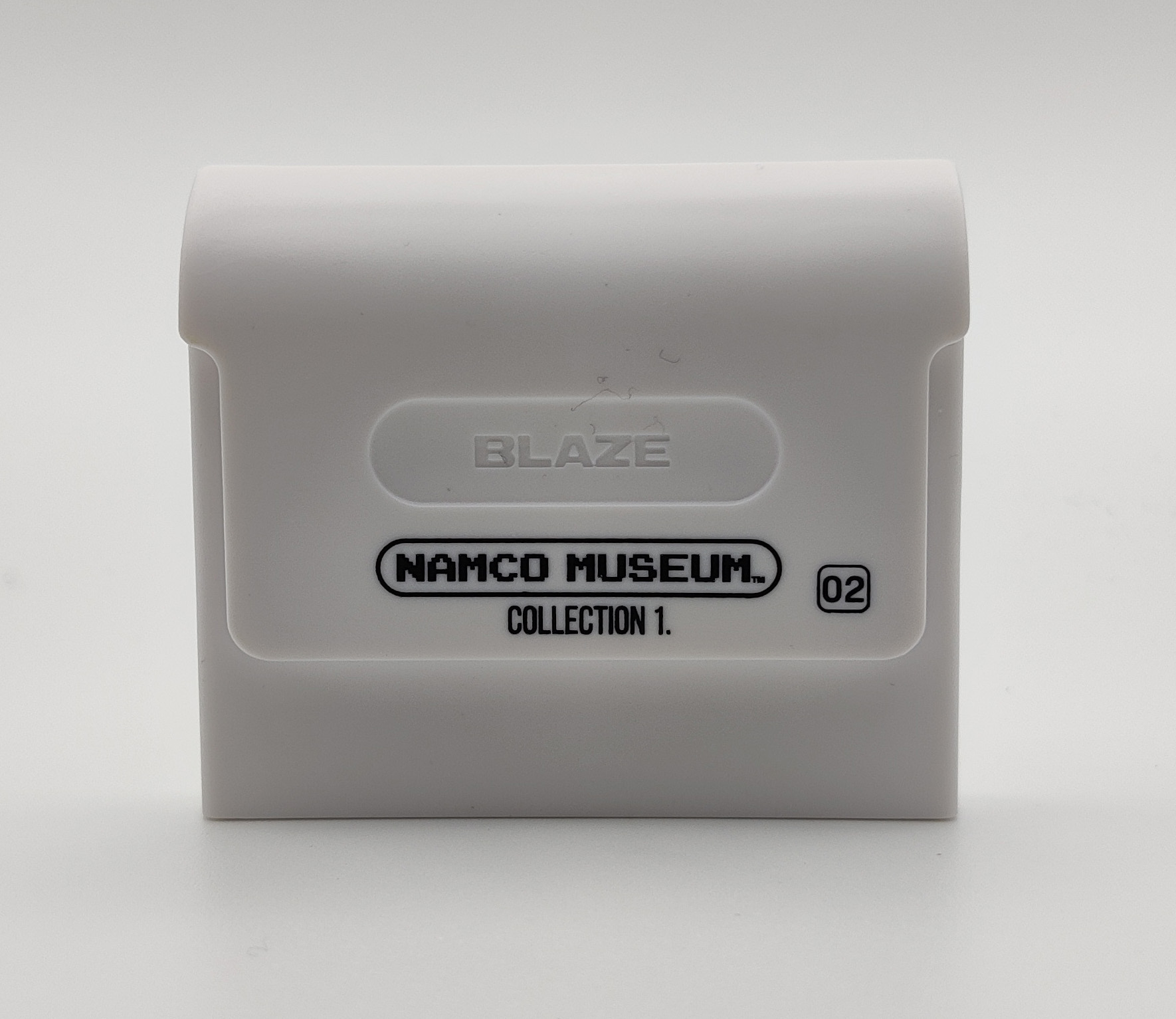
Evercade game cartridge, this being the visible side, facing out when inserted into an Evercade Handheld

Games for the Evercade are distributed on multi-game ROM cartridges, each one usually containing between 5 and 20 games, although several cartridges contained fewer than five games. Evercade cartridges support the ability to save a game, a modern feature not usually present in older games. The Evercade's use of game cartridges was considered unique, as most retro handheld consoles used built-in or downloaded game ROMs. Unlike other retro consoles, the goal for the Evercade was to provide retrogamers a chance to build a collection of physical games. Cartridges, clamshell packaging, and paper instruction manuals were part of the effort to appeal to retrogamers, as digital game downloads had become common in recent years. Cartridges and their packaging are numbered to encourage collecting. Evercade cartridges are white in color, and are similar in size to Game Boy and Game Gear cartridges. In 2024, Blaze Entertainment announced new cartridges known as Giga Carts. Although identical in appearance and size, they will feature additional storage space for emulating modern games on the Evercade.

Cartridges contain recreations of existing games through emulation, and Evercade developers worked with the original software developers to ensure accurate game recreations. Atari was announced in April 2019 as the first game publisher to work with the Evercade developers. Subsequent partnerships were announced with Interplay Entertainment, Data East, and Bandai Namco Entertainment. Each Evercade cartridge contains games unique to their respective publishing company.

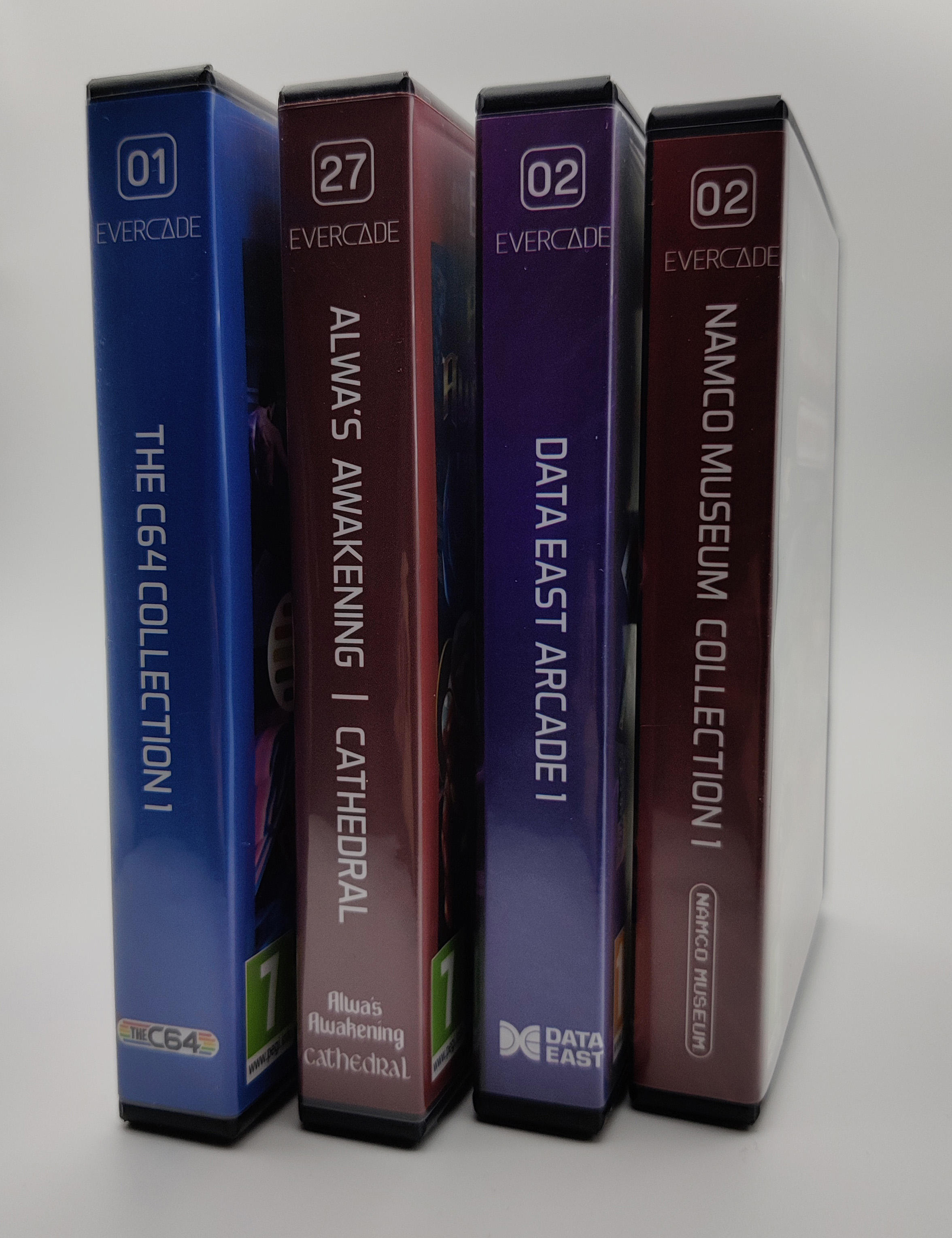
Boxes housing Evercade game cartridges. The colors of the cover indicate the product range.

Blaze Entertainment held discussions with game licensees and requested specific games for release on the Evercade. Such games were usually well known or rare. Games from Japanese studios were also sought for release on the Evercade. Aside from Blaze's requests, licensees would also make their own suggestions on which games to release. Byatt said that many games were turned down for consideration: "We've gone for quality over quantity, in our view. We don't want to be a console that has 3,000 games." Other games could not be licensed for an Evercade release because of lost paperwork that was necessary to prove who owns the rights to such games. Discussions were also held with indie game developers about launching original, retro-like games on the console. Mega Cat Studios later made an agreement to release an Evercade cartridge with 10 homebrew games that had previously been released for the NES and the Mega Drive.

The Evercade runs emulators that have been licensed by Blaze or custom-built in some cases. The console is capable of playing games originally released for the Atari 2600, Atari 7800, Atari Lynx, NES, SNES, Mega Drive, Intellivision, PlayStation and Neo Geo.

The Evercade had 10 game cartridges available at launch, providing a total of 122 games. Blaze intended to build up an Evercade game collection of more than 50 cartridges over the next few years. Cartridges by Piko Interactive and Mega Cat were among those available at launch. Evercade games typically sell for $20. Arc System Works published a cartridge full of beat 'em up games originally developed by Technōs. The Namco Museum Collection cartridge includes the first official English translation of the game Mappy Kids. Iron Commando, which had previously received only a limited release by Piko, also saw a release on the Evercade. Other cartridges include games such as Tanglewood, and a collection of Atari Lynx games.

Home conversions of arcade games, such as Asteroids and Pac-Man, have also been released. The original arcade ROMs were initially not used because of issues concerning the aspect ratio, as some arcade games use a vertical screen that would not display properly on the Evercade's horizontal screen. A collection of games by the Oliver Twins was released later in 2020. The collection has 11 games, including Wonderland Dizzy. A cartridge of Jaleco games was released in 2021, along with another cartridge containing games from the Worms series. Other cartridges included collections of indie games, as well as Intellivision games. In 2021, Blaze also began releasing cartridges featuring arcade ROMs, with the first four containing games from Technōs, Data East, Gaelco, and Atari. In July 2022, Blaze announced a cartridge featuring Commodore 64 games, the first with ROMs from a home computer system. Cartridge cases are different in color: red for console, purple for arcade, and blue for home computer. Each type is also numbered separately.

In addition to those available on cartridges, hidden games can be unlocked from menu codes, button combo codes, and certain combinations of cartridges inserted into the Evercade VS together.

On 14 November 2023, Full Void by OutOfTheBit became the Evercade's first single-game cartridge release. It was released in a standard edition and a limited-run special edition, the latter selling out within a few days. The special edition included a blue-coloured cartridge, stickers, a poster, the same comic featured in the standard edition, an art book, and an exclusive cart inlay—all in one cardboard sleeve. Full Void is also notable for running natively on Evercade hardware rather than through emulation.

Blaze reached an agreement with SNK to release new products starting in 2025, including a cartridge containing six Neo Geo games.

== Reception ==
Reviewers praised the console's emulation of classic games. Andrew Liszewski of Gizmodo stated that the games worked flawlessly: "There's no stutter, no dropped frames, no screen tearing artifacts, and no issues with sound sync. They just all work and let you immediately jump into what's important: the gameplay." Brendan Griffith of GamesRadar+ rated the Evercade three and a half stars out of five and called it "handheld heaven for older gamers wanting to revisit some classic games," while writing that "curious newcomers" may also have an interest in it. Damien McFerran of Nintendo Life called the system "appealing enough to surely sell in the modest numbers required to build a fairly robust audience". John Linneman of Digital Foundry praised the size of the console compared to smaller handhelds, writing that it has "a nice weight and doesn't feel like a cheap, hollow device." Adam Patrick Murray of PC World rated the console four and a half stars out of five, and also praised its size. Liszewski praised the Evercade for its simplicity. Simon Hill of Wired rated it 8 out of 10, and praised the save feature.

Andrew Webster of The Verge stated that the Evercade "straddles the line between modern and retro in a way that's very satisfying", while writing that the game cartridges "strike a nice balance of well-known hits and more obscure releases." Nick Thorpe of Retro Gamer praised the inclusion of Atari 7800 games, which are lesser-known and more difficult to acquire. Adam Ismail of Tom's Guide rated the console four stars out of five, but criticized the lack of games from Nintendo, Sega and Konami. Marcus Estrada of Hardcore Gamer praised the variety of available games, but criticized arcade games such as Centipede for being home conversions rather than original releases. He ultimately concluded that the console is "a love letter to retro games that will be welcomed into the homes of classic gaming fans and collectors worldwide." Will Greenwald of PC Magazine rated the Evercade 3.5 out of 5, but was also critical of the home-conversion arcade games. McFerran praised the cartridges for their inclusion of popular games, but wrote "you really have to buy all 10 carts to get all of the best games, and some of the collections are padded out with filler that you'll play once and forget about." Other reviewers also opined that many of the games would have limited appeal. Some reviewers, overwhelmed by the wide selection of downloadable ROMs through the Internet, praised the Evercade for its limited selection.

Reviewers praised the controls, but criticized the layout of the action buttons. Linneman wrote, "With NES games, for instance, A and B are mapped to the corresponding buttons where I would typically prefer X and A. Mega Drive/Genesis games also make use of A, B and Y which, again, doesn't feel entirely natural to me." Ismail praised the company for its quick response to the layout issue: "The fact Blaze moved swiftly to push this update out in such close proximity to the handheld's release is a very encouraging sign that the company is listening". Murray was critical of the shoulder buttons for being too sensitive and the action buttons for being placed too close to each other.

Reviewers complained that the games fit too tightly in the cartridge slot, making extraction difficult. This was worsened by the fact that the cartridges have a smooth design which makes gripping them difficult. Blaze stated that these reviewers had received an early model and that the issue was remedied ahead of the console's launch. Kyle Orland of Ars Technica criticized the use of cartridges at a time when downloadable games had become commonplace: "Going back to the bad old days of switching between cartridges just isn't that appealing anymore."

The console's price was praised and considered affordable. The cartridge packaging received praise as well. Some critics were disappointed that the console uses a MicroUSB port rather than USB-C, and others were disappointed by the lack of multiplayer functionality. Estrada wrote that a small number of games, such as Splatterhouse 3, suffer from audio glitches. Other critics also complained of audio problems, but Blaze worked to correct them.

Reviewers stated that viewing the screen from an angle reduces the quality and visibility. Liszewski wrote that the screen is one of the largest ever seen on a handheld console, but "not one of the best," stating "you don’t have to tilt the console too far to find the screen starting to lose color." He added that the resolution is fine for gameplay, but "it leaves menus looking over pixelated, unless you’re willing to just pass that off as retro charm." Other reviewers criticized the minimal menu designs as well. Some reviewers complained of a visual problem in which shimmering was present during scrolling. Linneman was critical of the limited aspect selections.

== Subsequent systems ==
After the original Evercade, Blaze has developed and released a number of updated and additional Evercade products.

=== Evercade VS ===
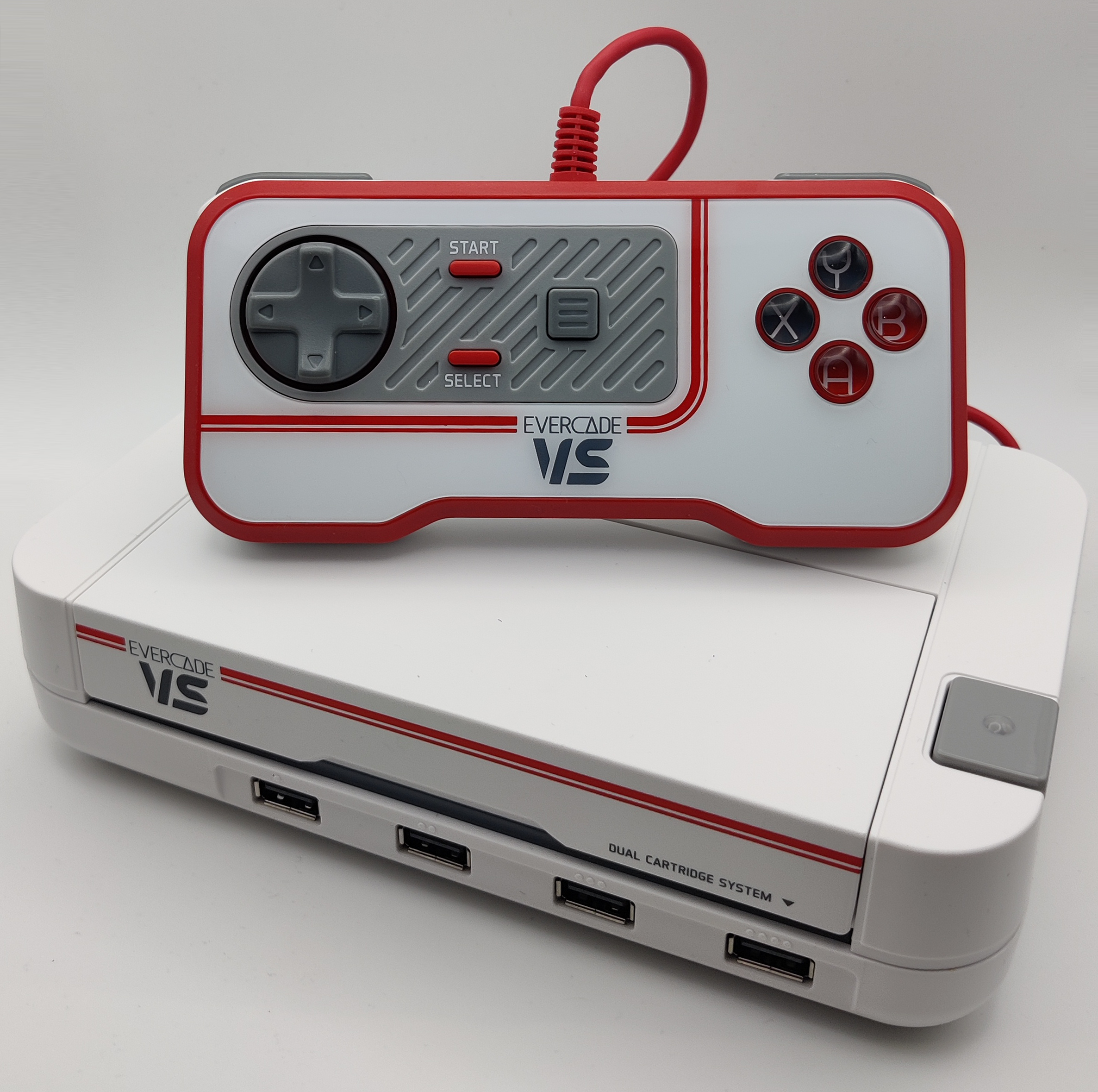
The Evercade VS base game system with one of up to four possible gamepads

In April 2021, Blaze announced a home console version known as Evercade VS. It is backwards-compatible with most games released for the handheld Evercade, with an output of 1080p. Unlike the handheld console, the VS has multiplayer functionality for up to four players. In addition to its own controllers, the handheld Evercade can be plugged into the VS and used as a controller. The VS was released in December 2021. A cheaper redesign, the VS-R, was released in August 2024.

=== Evercade EXP ===
In May 2022, Blaze announced the Evercade EXP, an improved version of the original Evercade. It was released on 15 December 2022. The console is held horizontally, but can also be positioned vertically for arcade games. It is compatible with all previously released Evercade games, and includes 18 built-in games by Capcom. The console is white, although an all-black limited edition would also be available, with 5,000 units produced. The standard console retails for £130/$150, while the limited edition is priced at £180/$227.

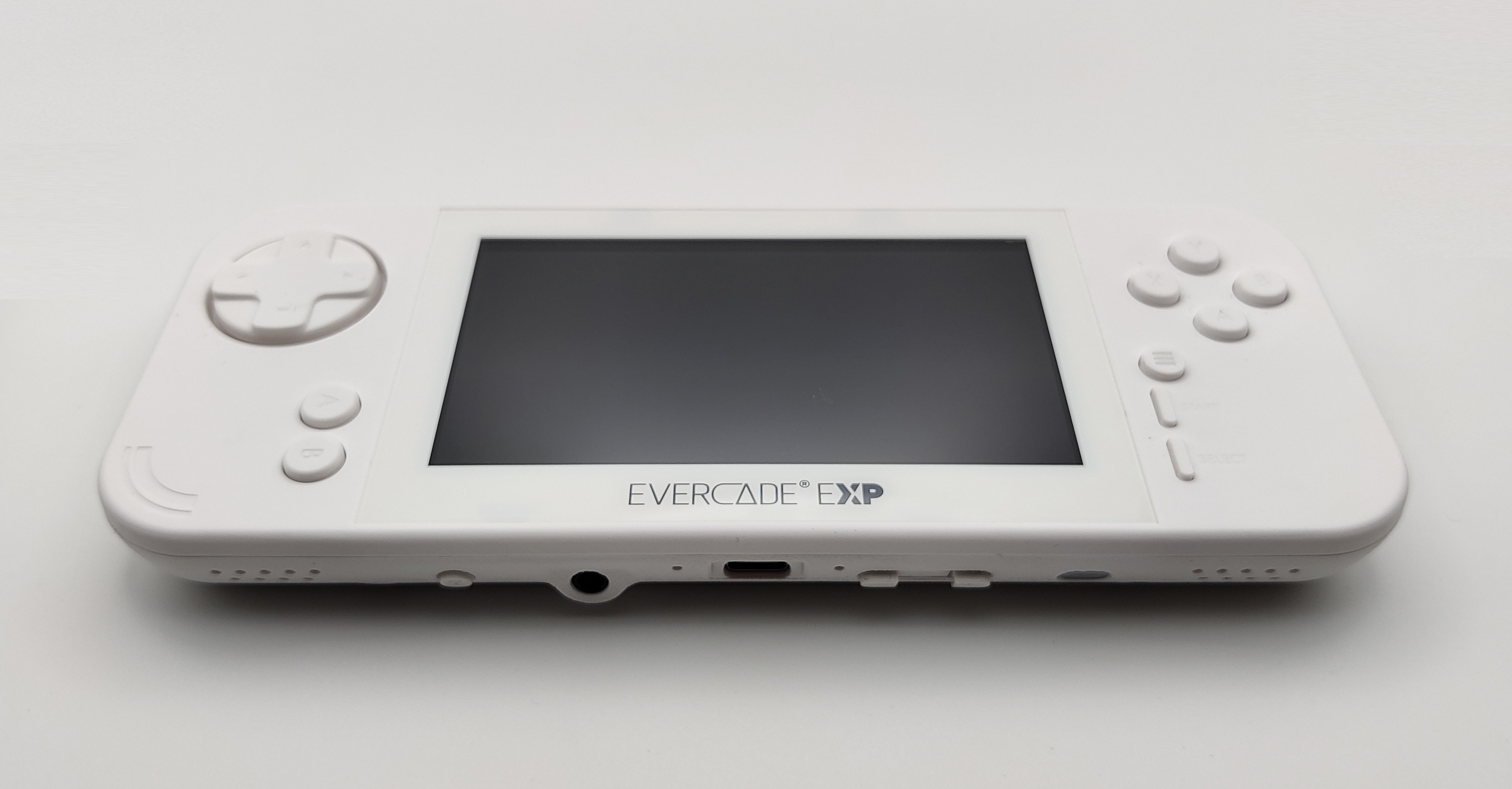
The Evercade EXP, the 2nd generation Evercade handheld

Compared to the original console, the EXP includes additional buttons and a slightly altered button layout. Although the screen is the same size as the original handheld, the EXP plays in higher resolution at 800x480. It has a mini-HDMI port for connection to a television, with output at 720p. The EXP uses a 1.5 GHz processor and has 4GB of RAM. It offers Wi-Fi for software and firmware updates. The console has a larger 3,000 mAh battery for up to five hours of usage, and it uses USB-C for recharging.

The console's improved screen and its addition of vertical orientation were both praised, although some critics were disappointed by the lack of Bluetooth.

A redesigned version, the Evercade EXP-R, was released in November 2024, at a lower retail price, while the original EXP was discontinued. The redesign excludes the mini-HDMI port and the 18 built-in games.

=== Super Pocket ===
In July 2023, Blaze Entertainment unveiled its new line of Super Pocket handhelds to be produced under the company's new HyperMegaTech brand. The console featured a smaller design at a lower price along with built in games by Capcom and Taito, depending on edition. Despite not being officially branded as an Evercade console the Super Pocket does feature a cartridge slot and is compatible with all Evercade games. Preorders for the console began in July 2023 with units expected to ship in October of that year. Additional editions featuring built in games from other developers have been released.

=== Evercade Alpha ===
Announced in May 2024, the Evercade Alpha is a tabletop arcade cabinet that is able to play Evercade cartridges and also has built-in licensed Capcom games.

=== Evercade Nexus ===
Revealed in April 2026, the Evercade Nexus is the successor to the EXP series, with a focus on playing 32 and 64-bit games. In addition to backwards compatibility with previous Evercade cartridges, the handheld features a larger display, dual analog sticks, and wireless multiplayer and game-sharing functionality. It was released on 30 October 2026, and includes a cartridge containing native ports of Banjo-Kazooie (1998) and Banjo-Tooie (2000).
