= Game Tengoku =

1995 video game

Game Tengoku: The Game Paradise!
- Advertising flyer
- Developer: Jaleco
- Publisher: Jaleco
- Director: Masahiro Arai
- Composer: Kazuo Sawa
- Series: Game Tengoku
- Platforms: Arcade, Sega Saturn, PlayStation 4, Windows, Nintendo Switch
- Release: JP: November 1995; NA: 1995
- Genre: Vertical-scrolling shooter
- Modes: Single-player, multiplayer

Game Tengoku: The Game Paradise! (Note: Japanese: ゲーム天国, Hepburn: Gēmu Tengoku; Game Heaven) is a 1995 vertical-scrolling shooter arcade game developed and published by Jaleco. The game is a parody of arcade shooters in a vein similar to the Parodius series. It was followed up with a sequel, Gun Bare! Game Tengoku 2.

An updated port of the Sega Saturn version for PlayStation 4 and Microsoft Windows, titled Game Tengoku CruisnMix, was released on November 29, 2017. The official English localization was released on November 29, 2018. A port for Nintendo Switch was released in Japan on December 19, 2019, and in North America and Europe on May 28, 2020.

== Gameplay ==
A screenshot from the arcade version, showing the player destroying waves of enemies.

Game Tengoku is a vertical-scrolling shooter similar to games like Parodius (1987). Its plot involves a mad scientist named Genius Yamada harnessing the power of arcade cabinets to take over the Me & You video arcade. The arcade's clerk, Yuki Ito, calls upon the help of various Jaleco protagonists to stop Yamada before he takes over all of the arcades in the world.

The player controls one of these Jaleco characters throughout the game's six stages, as they must destroy moving formations of enemies and avoid collision with them and their projectiles. These characters are taken from five 1980s arcade games: Exerion (1983), Formation Z (1984), Momoko 120% (1986), Butasan (1987), and Plus Alpha (1989). Each of them possesses their own unique weapon loadout themed to their original game; some feature a faster firing rate while others have more powerful projectiles. Characters also have "superbombs" that clear the screen of enemies when deployed. Destroying red cubical enemies dispenses a power-up capsule that increases the strength of the player's weapons, as well as two small ships known as "options" that provide additional firepower. Options take the form of one of the player characters and their weapons correspond to the character they are based on. The Sega Saturn version features several additions to the game, including a character from Field Combat (1985), an "Arrange" mode that implements story-driven cutscenes, and a remixed soundtrack.

== Release ==
An enhanced port of the Sega Saturn version, Game Tengoku CruisinMix Special, was released in Japan in 2017 for PlayStation 4 and Microsoft Windows. The English version was released on November 30, 2018.

== Reception ==
Reception

Review scores
Publication	Score
Nintendo Life	7/10 (CruisnMix)
Saturn Power	70% (Saturn)
Sega Saturn Magazine Japan	24/30 (Saturn)

In Japan, Game Machine listed Game Tengoku in their February 1, 1996 issue as being the sixteenth most-popular arcade game at the time.
