= 64th Street =

1992 video game

64th Street: A Detective Story
- Japanese arcade flyer
- Developer: CP.Brain
- Publisher: Jaleco
- Designer: Tokuhiro Takemori
- Composer: Kiyoshi Yokoyama
- Platform: Arcade
- Release: JP: Middle of March 1992; NA: 1992
- Genre: Beat 'em up
- Modes: Single-player, multiplayer

64th Street: A Detective Story (Note: Japanese: 64番街, Hepburn: 64 Bangai) is a 1992 beat 'em up video game developed by CP.Brain and published by Jaleco for arcades. It was released in Japan in March 1992 and in North America the same year. The two main characters are private detectives, who fight gangs through six stages to rescue a rich man's daughter who has been kidnapped.

== Plot ==
The story starts out in a typical Double Dragon/Final Fight style setting at 64th Street with two protagonists: Rick (Anderson), a calm and intelligent, 35-year-old professional private detective and manager of the detective agency; and Allen (Tombs), a 19-year-old, reformed delinquent trained by Rick, who is "short-tempered and violent when angry". At the start of the plot, an evil corporation known as the Legacy organization, kidnapped the daughter of a mid-aged rich man and left him a letter explaining why they kidnapped her.

Late one night, before Rick and Allen was about to close their office, the mid-aged rich man rushed inside the office while being exhausted. He asked for help saving his daughter and gave the letter to Rick and Allen. The next day, Allen notices an advertisement in the classifieds with similar sentence structure to the letter left by the kidnappers. Allen couldn't understand it so easily, until Rick told him to look cautiously at both, the letter and the ad. They soon realised that the writing was actually a secret code, only understood by certain crime lords, so Rick and Allen struggled toward the main base of the Legacy organisation to find the truth and save the kidnapped daughter. The setting later takes on a steampunk feel as it goes along, coming to a head in a battle inside a blimp.

== Gameplay ==
Screenshot of 64th Street: A Detective Story

Players One and Two start with the two selectable protagonists, Rick and Allen. Each private detective uses different fighting styles, attempt to solve cases by beating up each criminal they encounter. Many special items can be found by throwing enemies into the background and breaking things, typical of this popular genre in the 1990s arcades. Along the way they are harangued by all manner of thugs and toughs, whose costumes range from 1980s hip-hop wear to stereotypical pirates. The bosses are tough by way of strange special attacks.

== Legacy ==
64th Street spawned a series of beat 'em ups also developed by Jaleco for the Super Nintendo Entertainment System titled Rushing Beat. The game's two protagonists later made a cameo appearance in another Jaleco game, Chimera Beast. The game was released outside Japan for the first time by Hamster Corporation as part of their Arcade Archives series for the Nintendo Switch and PlayStation 4 in October 2020.
