= Jaleco =

Video game publisher

Jaleco Ltd.
- Type: Subsidiary
- ISIN: 141-0031
- Industry: Video game
- Founded: October 3, 1974; 52 years ago
- Founder: Yoshiaki Kanazawa
- Defunct: May 21, 2014
- Fate: Dissolved
- Successor: City Connection Co., Ltd
- Headquarters: Shinagawa-ku, Tokyo, Japan
- Products: Video games Arcade cabinets Aquarium equipment
- Parent: PCCW (2000−2005); Game Yarou (2009−2014)
- Divisions: Jaleco USA; JAQNO
- Website: jalecogames.co.jp

Jaleco Ltd. (株式会社ジャレコ, Kabushiki Kaisha Jareko) was a corporate brand name that was used by two previously connected video game developers and publishers based in Japan. The original Jaleco company was founded in 1974 as Japan Leisure Company, founded by Yoshiaki Kanazawa, before being renamed to simply Jaleco in the early 1980s. This company was later acquired in 2000 by Hong Kong company PCCW, who rebranded it as its Japanese game division, PCCW Japan, before reverting it to Jaleco in 2002. In 2006, Jaleco became independent from PCCW and renamed to Jaleco Holding, having its video game operations spun off into a new company, also called Jaleco. This new spin-off company was sold to mobile developer Game Yarou in 2009, with Jaleco Holding renaming itself to Encom Holdings shortly after.

Jaleco is known for its arcade and home console video games produced in the 1980s and early 1990s, including City Connection, Bases Loaded, Ninja JaJaMaru-kun, Exerion, Idol Janshi Suchie-Pai and Rushing Beat. Jaleco also produced arcade cabinets for other game developers, alongside redemption arcade games and UFO catcher claw machines. In the past, the company produced amusement park equipment and aquarium parts, under its JAQNO brand name. Their North American division, Jaleco USA, published a number of titles for the NES and SNES, including Maniac Mansion, Pinball Quest and R-Type III.

In 2014, Jaleco's parent company Game Yarou filed for bankruptcy, causing Jaleco to vanish from the video game industry. The company's video game assets would be purchased by City Connection, an indie Japanese studio that continues to use its games for other side projects and licensing deals (the company itself being named after one of Jaleco's games). The original Jaleco company, Encom Holdings, quit the video game business in 2009, citing stiff competition in the industry, instead dealing in real estate. Encom dissolved in 2013, and was delisted from the JASDAQ that same year.

Later in 2013, all of Jaleco's rights were transferred to City Connection who continued to release games from properties formerly owned by Jaleco.

== History ==
Jaleco was founded by Japanese businessman Yoshiaki Kanazawa on October 3, 1974. They were originally known as the Japan Leisure Co., Ltd. (株式会社ジャパンレジャー, Kabushiki-gaisha Japan Rejā), producing equipment for both amusement parks and arcade centers across Japan. The company was originally based out of Setagaya-ku, Tokyo.

Japan Leisure began production of arcade video games by 1982, and changed its corporate name to Jaleco, taking the first two letters of each word of "Japan Leisure Co.", in March 1983. Jaleco began production of home console video games for the Nintendo Entertainment System in Japan. Towards the mid-1980s, Jaleco would begin production of equipment for aquarium tanks, which were released under its JAQNO brand name. A North American office, Jaleco USA, operated in Northbrook, Illinois. This division sometimes published other third-party video games for both the NES and SNES consoles, notably Maniac Mansion and R-Type III, alongside distribution of Jaleco video games in the United States.

By 2000, Jaleco was struggling financially, being unable to produce a hit video game in several years. To keep the company afloat, Jaleco was acquired by Hong Kong-based company PCCW in November 2000, where it became the Japanese division of the company, renamed to PCCW Japan. Heavy company restructuring was performing, with Jaleco's arcade division shuttering in April 2001 while retaining its home console video game division. In April 2001, PCCW Japan purchased the VR-1 Group, the holder of North American MMO developer VR-1 Entertainment, in order to have its operations expand globally. In October 2002, PCCW Japan merged Jaleco USA and VR-1 Entertainment into a new company, Jaleco Entertainment, relocating to Buffalo, New York. PCCW Japan was renamed back to Jaleco in 2004. They would continue to operate for several years as a subsidiary of PCCW, producing video games for home consoles and Japanese mobile phones, alongside soundtrack albums and applications for web browsers.

In August 2005, PCCW sold off Jaleco to Sandringham Fund SPC, alongside the subsidiary company Hyperlink Investments Group. By July 2006, the company was renamed to Jaleco Holding and became a holding company. The video game operations were then spun off into a new company known as Jaleco, which would become a subsidiary of Jaleco Holding. The corporate restructure was done to reflect the company's diversified portfolio which no longer limited to video games and included activities such as real estate and financial services. In October 2007, Hyperlink Investments Group sold its stock in Jaleco Holding to Game Yarou, a Japanese mobile phone developer, and two South Korean corporations, STIC Pioneer Fund and A2i. Jaleco Holdings dissolved two subsidiary companies, FFBC Investment and J Consulting, in early 2008. Jaleco's North American division, Jaleco Entertainment, closed its doors later that year.

In January 2009, Jaleco Holding sold Jaleco to Game Yarou for ¥1 (US$0.01), but Game Yarou also assumed ¥700,000,000 ($7.736 million) of Jaleco Holding's ¥16,000,000,000 ($17.68 million) debt. A spokesperson for Jaleco Holding cited "increasing competition in recent years in the video game market" as the reason for the company's departure from the industry. Jaleco Holding renamed itself to Encom Holdings the same year in April, focusing on real estate and finance business in Japan and no longer being involved with video games. Encom Holdings dissolved on May 13, 2013, due to poor reputation and loss of income.

Under ownership of Game Yarou, Jaleco produced video games for Japanese mobile phones and web browsers, alongside licensing many of its older video games to third-party developers for use in other projects. One of the game titles that was released by Jaleco under this ownership was Ougon no Kizuna for the Wii, which was released in May 2009.

By 2012, Game Yarou was in financial crisis due to high debt and poor sales of its mobile titles – it was officially declared bankrupt by the Tokyo District Court on May 21, 2014. Jaleco would soon vanish from the video game industry, with its video games being acquired later that year by Japanese company City Connection. The company continues to use Jaleco video games for a number of projects, alongside licensing them out to other developers for use in other products.

== Games ==
=== Arcade ===
Year	Title	Notes	Ref(s)
1982	Blue Print	Developed by Ashby Computers and Graphics/Zilec Electronics; Japanese distribution only	
1982	Naughty Boy	Released by Cinematronics in North America	
1982	Check Man	Developed by Zilec-Zenitone; Japanese distribution only	
1982	Pop Flamer	Released by Stern Electronics in North America	
1983	Chameleon	Developed by Donga-Seiko/Tose	
1983	Exerion	Released by Taito in North America	
1983	Grasspin	Developed by Ashby Computers and Graphics/Zilec Electronics	
1983	Dingo	Developed by Ashby Computers and Graphics/Zilec Electronics	
1983	Saturn	Developed by Ashby Computers and Graphics/Zilec Electronics	
1983	Top Roller	Topped Japanese arcade chart in October 1983	
1984	D-Day	Developed by E.L.S.	
1984	Formation Z	Released by Williams in North America as Aeroboto	
1984	Gate-In! Wai Wai Jockey	Developed by Casio; known outside Japan as Photo Finish	
1984	Parallel Turn		
1984	Pinbo		
1985	City Connection	Released by Kitkorp in North America as Cruisin'	
1985	Field Combat		
1985	Vs. Ninja JaJaMaru-Kun	Japan-exclusive	
1986	Argus	Developed by NMK	
1986	Momoko 120%	Japan-exclusive	
1986	Valtric	Developed by NMK	
1987	Butasan	Japan-exclusive; developed by NMK	
1987	Exerizer	Released by Nichibutsu in North America as Sky Fox	
1987	Psychic 5	Developed by NMK	
1987	Ginga NinkyouDen		
1988	Arm Champs	Japan-exclusive	
1988	Dynamic Shoot Kyousou	Japan-exclusive)	
1988	Ninja Kazan	Known in Japan as Iga Ninjyutsuden: Goshin no Sho	
1988	Kick Off: Jaleco Cup	Japan-exclusive	
1988	Legend of Makai	Developed by NMK; known in Japan as Makai Densetsu	
1988	Moero!! Pro Yakyuu Homerun Kyousou	Japan-exclusive	
1988	NEW Moero!! Pro Yakyuu Homerun Kyousou	Japan-exclusive	
1988	P-47: The Phantom Fighter	Developed by NMK, known in Japan as P-47: The Freedom Fighter	
1988	Shingen Samurai-Fighter	Japan-exclusive	
1989	The Astyanax	Developed by Aicom, known in Japan as The Lord of King	
1989	Big Run: The Supreme 4WD Challenge: 11e Rallye		
1989	Hachoo!	Developed by Aicom	
1989	Jitsuryoku!! Pro Yakyuu	Japan-exclusive	
1989	Mahjong Daireikai	Developed by NMK, Japan-exclusive strip mahjong game	
1989	Plus Alpha		
1989	Saint Dragon	Developed by NMK	
1990	Alien Command	Ticket redemption game	
1990	Cisco Heat		
1990	Ganbare JaJaMaru Saisho wa Goo	Japan-exclusive	
1990	Mahjong Channel Zoom In	Japan-exclusive strip mahjong game	
1990	Mahjong Kakumei	Japan-exclusive strip mahjong game	
1990	Rod Land	Known in Japan as Yousei Monogatari Rod Land	
1991	In Your Face	Developed by Aicom, unreleased	
1991	Avenging Spirit	Developed by C.P.Brain, known in Japan as Phantasm	
1991	Earth Defense Force		
1991	Grand Prix Star		
1991	Circus Circus	Japan-exclusive	
1991	Arabian Nights	Japan-exclusive	
1991	Wonder Hunting	Japan-exclusive	
1991	Mini Hunting	Japan-exclusive	
1992	Arm Champs II		
1992	64th Street	Developed by C.P.Brain	
1992	Big Striker	Developed by C.P.Brain and Beyond	
1992	Mahjong Kakumei 2: Princess League	Japan-exclusive strip mahjong game	
1992	Soldam		
1992	Wild Pilot		
1992	B.O.T.S.S.: Battle of the Solar System	North American distribution only; developed by MicroProse	
1992	Wonder Hunting II	Japan-exclusive	
1993	Chimera Beast	Developed by C.P.Brain; unreleased	
1993	Captain Flag	Japan-exclusive	
1993	VS Super Captain Flag	Japan-exclusive	
1993	Cybattler		
1993	F-1 Grand Prix Star II		
1993	Hayaoshi Quiz Ouza Ketteisen: The King of Quiz	Japan-exclusive	
1993	Idol Janshi Suchie-Pai Special	Japan-exclusive strip mahjong game	
1993	Peek-a-Boo!	Erotic game	
1993	Rolling Panic	Japan-exclusive; originally released by Excellent System as Dream 9 Final	
1993	Basket Bull	North America-exclusive ticket redemption game	
1994	Best Bout Boxing		
1994	F-1 Super Battle		
1994	Hayaoshi Quiz Grand Champion Taikai	Japan-exclusive	
1994	Hayaoshi Quiz Nettou Namahousou		
1994	Idol Janshi Suchie-Pai II	Japan-exclusive strip mahjong game	
1994	World PK Soccer		
1994	Scud Hammer	Japan-exclusive	
1994	Battle K-Road	North American distribution only; originally released by Psikyo	
1994	Gunbird	North American distribution only; originally released by Psikyo	
1994	Alley Cats	North America-exclusive ticket redemption game	
1994	Spider Stompin'	North American distribution only, originally released by Island Design	
1994	Spider Splattin'	North American distribution only, originally released by Island Design	
1995	Desert War	Developed by NMK	
1995	The Game Paradise: Master of Shooting!		
1995	Mahjong Angel Kiss	Japan-exclusive strip mahjong game	
1995	P-47 Aces	Developed by NMK	
1995	Tetris Plus		
1996	Gratia: Second Earth		
1996	Ryuusei Janshi Kirara Star	Japan-exclusive strip mahjong game	
1996	Super GT 24h		
1996	World PK Soccer V2		
1996	Skating Shot	Japan-exclusive prize redemption game	
1997	Over Rev		
1997	Tetris Plus 2		
1997	Vs. Janshi Brandnew Stars	Japan-exclusive strip mahjong game	
1997	Puzzle Uo Poko	Developed by Cave	
1997	Match Three	North America-exclusive ticket redemption game, developed by HanaHo Games	
1999	Idol Janshi Suchie-Pai III	Japan-exclusive strip mahjong game	
1999	VJ: Visual & Music Slap	Japan-exclusive rhythm game	
1999	VJ: Visual & Music Slap DASH	Japan-exclusive rhythm game	
1999	Rave Master	Japan-exclusive rhythm game	
1999	Stepping Stage	Japan-exclusive rhythm game	
1999	Stepping Stage Special	Japan-exclusive rhythm game	
1999	Stepping Stage 2 SUPREME	Japan-exclusive rhythm game	
1999	Stepping 3 SUPERIOR	Japan-exclusive rhythm game	
1999	Rock'n Tread	Japan-exclusive rhythm game	
1999	Rock'n Tread 2	Japan-exclusive rhythm game	
1999	Rock'n MegaSession	Japan-exclusive rhythm game	
1999	Rock'n 3	Japan-exclusive rhythm game	
2000	Dream Audition	Japan-exclusive rhythm game	

=== Casino ===
All games in this section are Japan-exclusive.

Year	Title	Notes	Ref(s)
1990	Big III: 3Reel Roulette		
1991	Joyful Cards: Jaleco 5Reel Poker		
1992	Jokers Wild		
1992	Draw Poker		
1992	Four Jokers		
1992	Raise Bet Poker		
1992	Axis Bells	Originally released by Wing as Lucky Bells	
1992	Slot Match: 3Reel Slot		

=== PC ===
Year	Title	Notes	Ref(s)
1997	Fighter Ace	developed by VR-1	
1997	UltraCorps	developed by VR-1	
1999	Fighter Ace II	developed by VR-1	
2002	Fighter Ace 3.5	developed by Ketsujin Studios	
2002	Trailer Park Tycoon		
2004	World Championship Pool 2004	developed by Blade Interactive	
2004	Room Zoom: Race for Impact	developed by Blade Interactive	

=== MSX ===
Year	Title	Notes	Ref(s)
1984	Top Roller	released in Europe by Eaglesoft	
1984	Exerion II: Zorni	released in Europe by Eaglesoft as Zorni	
1984	D-Day	released in Europe by Eaglesoft	
1985	Formation Z	released in Europe by Eaglesoft	
1986	Snake Runner	released by Eaglesoft	
1986	Alien 8	Japanese distribution only, licensed from Ultimate Play the Game	
1986	Gunfright	Japanese distribution only, licensed from Ultimate Play the Game	
1986	City Connection	released in Europe by Eaglesoft	
1986	Ninja-kun: Majou no Bouken	released in Europe by Eaglesoft as Ninja	
1986	Ninja JaJaMaru-kun	released in Europe by Eaglesoft as Ninja II	
1987	Mississippi Satsujin Jiken: Murder on the Mississippi	Japan-exclusive	
1987	Break In	Japanese distribution only, licensed from Eaglesoft	
1988	Moero!! Nettou Yakyuu '88	Japan-exclusive	

=== NES/Famicom ===
Year	Title	Notes
1985	Exerion	Japan-exclusive, developed by Tose
1985	Formation Z	Japan-exclusive, developed by Hect
1985	Ninja-Kun: Majou no Bouken	Japan-exclusive, developed by Tose
1985	Field Combat	Japan-exclusive, developed by Tose
1985	City Connection	Developed by Axes Art Amuse
1985	Ninja JaJaMaru-kun	Japan-exclusive, developed by Tose
1986	Argus	Japan-exclusive, developed by Tose
1986	Choplifter	Japan-exclusive, developed by Tose
1986	JaJaMaru no Daibouken	Japan-exclusive, developed by Tose
1986	Urusei Yatsura: Lum no Wedding Bell	Japan-exclusive, developed by Tose
1986	Mississippi Satsujin Jiken: Murder on the Mississippi	Japan-exclusive, developed by Tose
1986	Knight Lore: Majou no Ookami Otoko	Famicom Disk System, developed by Tose
1987	Fuuun Shaolin Ken	Famicom Disk System, developed by ose
1987	Youkai Club	Japan-exclusive, developed by Tose
1987	Bases Loaded	Developed by Tose
1987	Monty no Doki Doki Daidassou: Monty on the Run	Famicom Disk System
1987	Bio Senshi Dan: Increaser to no Tatakai	Japan-exclusive, developed by Atlus
1987	Esper Boukentai	Japan-exclusive, developed by NMK
1987	Ucuusen Cosmo Carrier	Famicom Disk System, developed by Tose
1987	Druid: Kyoufu no Tobira	Famicom Disk System
1988	Racket Attack	Famicom Disk System, developed by Tose
1988	Fuuun Shaolin Ken: Ankoku no Maou	Famicom Disk System, developed by Tose
1988	Wizards & Warriors	Japanese distribution only, developed by Rare
1988	Radical Bomber!! Jirai-Kun	Famicom Disk System
1988	Bases Loaded II: Second Season	Famicom Disk System
1988	Big Challenge! Judo Senshuken	Famicom Disk System
1988	Maniac Mansion	Famicom Disk System
1988	Big Challenge! Dogfight Spirit	Famicom Disk System
1988	Saiyuuki World	Japan-exclusive, developed by NMK
1988	Hoops	Developed by Aicom
1988	Chuugoku Senseijutsu	Japan-exclusive, developed by Aicom
1988	Goal!	Developed by Hudson Soft
1988	RoboWarrior	North American & European distribution only, developed by Hudson Soft
1989	Astyanax	Developed by Aicom
1989	JaJaMaru Ninpou Chou	Japan-exclusive, developed by NMK
1989	Big Challenge! Gun Fighter	Famicom Disk System
1989	Big Challenge! Go Go Bowling	Famicom Disk System
1989	Shin Moero!! Pro Yakyuu	Japan-exclusive, developed by Tose
1989	Okkotoshi Puzzle Tonjan!?	Japan-exclusive, developed by NMK
1989	Terao no Dosukoi Oozumou	Famicom Disk System, developed by Tose
1990	Pinball Quest	Developed by Tose
1990	JaJaMaru Gekimaden: Maboroshi no Kinmajou	Japan-exclusive
1990	Moero!! Judo Warriors	Japan-exclusive
1990	Bases Loaded 3	Developed by Tose
1990	Totally Rad	Developed by Aicom
1990	A Boy and His Blob: Trouble on Blobolonia	Japanese distribution only, developed by Imagineering
1990	Whomp 'Em	Developed by Sculptured Software
1990	Metal Mech: Man & Machine	Developed by Sculptured Software
1991	The Last Ninja	North America-exclusive, developed by Beam Software
1991	Ninja JaJaMaru: Ginga Daisakusen	Japan-exclusive, developed by Tose
1991	Bases Loaded 4	Developed by Tose
1991	Tsurupika Hagemaru: Mezase! Tsuruseko no Akashi	Japan-exclusive
1991	Shatterhand	North American & European distribution only, developed by Natsume
1992	Pizza Pop!	Japan-exclusive, developed by Arc System Works
1992	Rampart	North America-exclusive, developed by Bitmasters
1992	Plasma Ball	Japan-exclusive
1992	Toukon Club	Japan-exclusive, developed by Natsume
1992	Goal! Two	Developed by Tose
1992	Rod Land	Developed by The Sales Curve
1992	Cyberball	North America-exclusive, developed by Tengen
1992	The Young Indiana Jones Chronicles	Developed by Chris Gray Enterprises
1993	Mezase! Top Pro: Green ni Kakeru Yume	Japan-exclusive, developed by Tose
1993	Pro Sport Hockey	Developed by Tose

=== Super NES/Super Famicom ===
- Big Run: The Supreme 4WD Challenge: 13e Rallye (1991, Japan-exclusive)
- Super Bases Loaded (1991, developed by Tose)
- Earth Defense Force (1991)
- Rival Turf! (1992)
- Goal! (1992, developed by TOSE)
- Super Bases Loaded 2 (1992, developed by Tose)
- Super Professional Baseball II (1992, Japan-exclusive, developed by Tose)
- King Arthur's World (1992, developed by Argonaut Games)
- Brawl Brothers (1992)
- Pro Sport Hockey (1993, developed by Tose)
- Tuff E Nuff (1993)
- Operation Logic Bomb: The Ultimate Search & Destroy (1993)
- Bishoujo Janshi Suchie-Pai (1993, Japan-exclusive strip mahjong game, developed by K.K. DCE)
- Utopia: The Creation of a Nation (1993, North American distribution only, developed by Gremlin Interactive)
- Super Goal! 2 (1993, developed by Tose)
- The Peace Keepers (1993)
- Kingyo Chuuihou! Tobidase! Game Gakuen (1994, Japan-exclusive)
- Jurassic Park (1994, Japanese distribution only, developed by Ocean Software)
- Super Ninja-kun (1994, Japan-exclusive)
- HammerLock Wrestling (1994)
- R-Type III (1994, North American distribution only, developed by Irem)
- The Ignition Factor (1994)
- Takeda Nobuhiro no Super League Soccer (1994, Japan-exclusive, developed by Tose)
- JWP Joshi Pro Wrestling: Pure Wrestle Queens (1994, Japan-exclusive)
- Super Bases Loaded 3: License to Steal (1994, developed by Tose)
- Sterling Sharpe: End 2 End (1995, North America-exclusive, developed by Tose)

=== GameCube ===
- Super Bubble Pop (2003, North America-exclusive, developed by Runecraft)
- Goblin Commander: Unleash the Horde (2003)
- Room Zoom: Race for Impact (2005, North America-exclusive, developed by Blade Interactive)
- World Championship Pool 2004 (2005, Europe-exclusive, developed by Blade Interactive)

=== Wii ===
- Zenkoku Dekotora Matsuri (2008, Japan-exclusive, developed by Suzak)
- Ougon no Kizuna (2009, Japan-exclusive, developed by TownFactory)

=== Game Boy ===
- Hero Shuugou!! Pinball Party (1990, Japan-exclusive)
- Bases Loaded for Game Boy (1990, developed by Tose)
- Maru's Mission (1990, developed by Tose)
- The Rescue of Princess Blobette (1990, Japanese distribution only, developed by Imagineering)
- Battle Unit Zeoth (1990)
- In Your Face (1990, North America-exclusive)
- Fortified Zone (1991)
- Vanishing Racer (1991, Japan-exclusive)
- Q*bert for Game Boy (1992, developed by Realtime Associates)
- Ikari no Yousai 2 (1992, Japan-exclusive)
- WordZap (1992, North America-exclusive, developed by Realtime Associates)
- Rampart (1992, developed by C-Lab)
- Avenging Spirit (1992)
- Dirty Racing (1993, Japan-exclusive, developed by Gremlin Interactive)
- Rod Land (1993, developed by Eurocom)
- Goal! (1993, developed by Tose)
- Soldam (1993, Japan-exclusive)
- Tetris Plus (1996, Japanese distribution only)
- The Fidgetts (1997, North American distribution only, developed by Game Over Productions)
- Dr. Franken II (1997, North America-exclusive, developed by MotiveTime)
- Hayaoshi Quiz Ouza Ketteisen: The King of Quiz (1998, Japan-exclusive quiz game)

=== Game Boy Color ===
- Get Mushi Club: Minna no Konchuu Daizukan (1999, Japan-exclusive)
- Pocket Bowling (1999, North American distribution only, developed by Athena)

=== Game Boy Advance ===
- Kawaii Pet Shop Monogatari 3 (2002, Japan-exclusive, released as PCCW Japan)
- Sea Trader: Rise of Taipan (2002, North America-exclusive)
- Scan Hunter: Sen Nen Kaiuo wo Oe! (2002, Japan-exclusive, released as PCCW Japan, developed by DA1)
- Darius R (2002, Japan-exclusive, released as PCCW Japan, developed by RideonJapan)
- Toukon Heat (2002, Japan-exclusive, released as PCCW Japan)
- Jazz Jackrabbit (2002, developed by Game Titan)
- Karnaaj Rally (2002, developed by Paragon 5)
- Super Bubble Pop (2003, North America-exclusive, developed by Runecraft)
- JaJa-Kun Jr. Denshouki (2004, Japan-exclusive)
- Moero!! Jaleco Collection (2004, Japan-exclusive)

=== Nintendo DS ===
- Brain Buster Puzzle Pak (2006, Japanese distribution only, developed by Suzak)
- Chuukana Janshi Tenhoo Painyan Remix (2006, Japan-exclusive strip mahjong game)
- Puchi Puchi Virus (2007, released in North America by NIS America)
- Idol Janshi Suchie-Pai III Remix (2007, Japan-exclusive strip mahjong game)
- Nep League DS (2007, Japan-exclusive)
- Denjirou Sensei no Fushigi na Jikkenshitsu (2008, Japan-exclusive)
- Chou!! Nep League DS (2008, Japan-exclusive)
- Imasugu Tsukaeru Mamechishiki: Quiz Zatsugaku-Ou DS (2010, Japan-exclusive quiz game)
- WiZmans World (2010, Japan-exclusive RPG)

=== PlayStation ===
- Idol Janshi Suchie-Pai Limited (1995, Japan-exclusive strip mahjong game)
- Bases Loaded '96: Double Header (1995)
- Slam Dragon (1996, Japan-exclusive)
- Tetris Plus (1996)
- Idol Janshi Suchie-Pai II Limited (1996, Japan-exclusive strip mahjong game)
- Turf Wind '96: Take Yutaka Kyousouba Ikusei Game (1996, Japan-exclusive, developed by Tose)
- Tokyo Highway Battle (1996, North American & European distribution only, developed by Genki)
- Ninja JaJaMaru-kun: Onigiri Ninpouchou (1997, Japan-exclusive, developed by Infinity)
- BRAHMA Force: The Assault on Beltlogger 9 (1997, North American & European distribution only, developed by Genki)
- Fantastep (1997, Japan-exclusive)
- Cheesy (1997, Japanese distribution only, developed by CTA Developments)
- Mini-Yonku Bakusou Kyoudai: Let's & Go!!: WGP Hyper Heat (1997, Japan-exclusive, developed by C-Lab)
- Speed Racer (1998, North American distribution only, developed by Graphic Research)
- GunBare! Game Tengoku 2: The Game Paradise 2 (1998, Japan-exclusive)
- Suchie-Pai Adventure Doki Doki Nightmare (1998, Japan-exclusive erotic game)
- T: Kara Hajimaru Monogatari (1998, Japan-exclusive)
- Bakusou Kyoudai Let's & Go!! Eternal Wings (1998, Japan-exclusive)
- Dragonseeds (1998)
- Nectaris: Military Madness (1998, North American distribution only, developed by Matrix Software)
- Punky Skunk (1998, North American distribution only, developed by Ukiyotei)
- Battle Konchuuden (1999, Japan-exclusive)
- Irritating Stick (1999, North American distribution only, developed by Saurus)
- Option Tuning Car Battle 2 (1999, Japan-exclusive, developed by MTO)
- K-1 Revenge (1999, North American distribution only, developed by Daft)
- Juggernaut (1999, North American distribution only, developed by Will)
- Vampire Hunter D (1999, North American distribution only, developed by Victor Interactive Software)
- Shiibas 1-2-3 Destiny! (2000, Japan-exclusive)
- K-1 Grand Prix (2000, North American distribution only, developed by Daft)
- Vanark (2000, North American distribution only, developed by Bit Town)
- Builder's Block (2000, North American distribution only, developed by Taito)
- Super Bubble Pop (2002, North America-exclusive, developed by Runecraft)
- Jaleco Collection Vol. 1 (2003, Japan-exclusive, released as PCCW Japan)

=== PlayStation 2 ===
- Stepping Selection (2000, Japan-exclusive)
- Rock'n MegaStage (2000, Japan-exclusive)
- Dream Audition (2000, Japan-exclusive)
- Dream Audition 2 (2000, Japan-exclusive)
- Super Micchan (2001, Japan-exclusive)
- Dream Audition 3 (2001, Japan-exclusive)
- Dream Audition Super Hit Disc 1 (2001, Japan-exclusive)
- Dream Audition Super Hit Disc 2 (2001, Japan-exclusive)
- Raging Blades (2002, released as PCCW Japan)
- Hooligan: Kimi no Naka no Yuuki (2002, Japan-exclusive, released as PCCW Japan)
- Baldur's Gate: Dark Alliance (2002, Japanese distribution only, released as PCCW Japan, developed by Snowblind Studios)
- Toukon Inoki Michi: Puzzle de Daa! (2002, Japan-exclusive, released as PCCW Japan, developed by Matrix Software)
- Idol Janshi R: Janguru Project (2002, Japan-exclusive strip mahjong game, released as PCCW Japan)
- Lowrider (2002)
- Sweet Legacy (2002, Japan-exclusive, released as PCCW Japan, developed by Frontwing)
- Goblin Commander: Unleash the Horde (2003)
- Otona no Gal Jan: Kimi ni Hane Man (2003, Japan-exclusive strip mahjong game, released as PCCW Japan)
- World Championship Pool 2004 (2004, North America-exclusive, developed by Blade Interactive)
- Shin Bakusou Dekotora Densetsu Tenka Touitsu Choujou Kessen (2005, developed by Spike)
- Room Zoom: Race for Impact (2005, Europe-exclusive, developed by Blade Interactive)
- World Super Police (2005, developed by Suzak)
- Otona no Gal Jan 2 (2005, Japan-exclusive strip mahjong game)
- Idol Janshi Suchie-Pai IV (2007, Japan-exclusive strip mahjong game)

=== Xbox ===
- NightCaster II: Equinox (2002)
- Super Bubble Pop (2002)
- Pulse Racer (2002, North America-exclusive)
- Goblin Commander: Unleash the Horde (2003)
- World Championship Pool 2004 (2003, developed by Blade Interactive)
- Room Zoom: Race for Impact (2004, developed by Blade Interactive)
- Kingdom Under Fire: The Crusaders (2005, Japanese distribution only, developed by Phantagram)

=== Sega Saturn ===
- Idol Janshi Suchie-Pai Special (1995, Japan-exclusive strip mahjong game)
- Idol Janshi Suchie-Pai Remix (1995, Japan-exclusive strip mahjong game)
- Bases Loaded '96: Double Header (1995)
- Idol Janshi Suchie-Pai II (1996, Japan-exclusive strip mahjong game)
- Tetris Plus (1996)
- Turf Wind '96: Take Yutaka Kyousouba Ikusei Game (1996, Japan-exclusive)
- Fantastep (1997, Japan-exclusive)
- Game Tengoku: The Game Paradise! (1997, Japan-exclusive)
- Ninja JaJaMaru-kun: Onigiri Ninpouchou Gold (1997, Japan-exclusive)
- Suchie-Pai Adventure Doki Doki Nightmare (1998, Japan-exclusive erotic game)
- GT24 (1998, Japan-exclusive port of Super GT 24h)
- Idol Janshi Suchie-Pai Mecha Genteiban (1998, Japan-exclusive strip mahjong game)
- Idol Janshi Suchie-Pai Secret Album (1999, Japan-exclusive strip mahjong game)

=== Sega Dreamcast ===
- Idol Janshi wo Tsukucchaou (1999, Japan-exclusive strip mahjong game)
- Carrier (2000)

=== WonderSwan ===
- Ganso JaJaMaru-kun (1999)
- Moero!! Pro Yakyuu Rookies (2000, developed by Tose)

=== 3DO ===
- Idol Janshi Suchie-Pai Special (1995, Japan-exclusive strip mahjong game)

=== Mobile ===
- Antonio Inoki vs Jaleco (アントニオ猪木VSジャレコ) (2004, Japan-exclusive, developed by Inoki International)
- Jaleco Reversi Revengers (ジャレコリバーシ・リベンジャーズ) (2004, Japan-exclusive, developed by Inoki International)
- Real Time Adventure -EOW- (リアルタイムアドベンチャー-EOW-) (2005, Japan-exclusive, developed by Inoki International)
- Jaleco Super Tennis Heroine Cup (ジャレコスーパーテニス ヒロインカップ) (2007, Japan-exclusive)
- Tenkuu no Kinki (天空の禁忌) (2007, Japan-exclusive)
- Mahou ga Ochiru Hi (魔王が墜ちる日) (2007, Japan-exclusive)
- Mahou ga Ochiru Hi 2 (魔王が墜ちる日II) (2007, Japan-exclusive)
- Jumping Peng (ペンギンピコの大冒険) (2009, Japan-exclusive, developed by Mobileday)
- Magic Block Limited Edition (マジックブロック) (2009, Japan-exclusive, developed by Mobileday)

=== Prototypes/cancelled games ===
- Exerion (NES, 1985, cancelled North American release)
- Block Buster (Arcade, 1987, also known as Bombs Away)
- Vs. Great Tennis (Arcade, 1988)
- Bashi Bazook: Morphoid Master (1988, cancelled North American release of Bio Senshi Dan: Increaser tono Tatakai)
- Counter Force (Arcade, 1989)
- R&T (Arcade, 1990, European prototype of Rod Land)
- Super Dog Booby: Akachan Daibouken no Maki (Famicom, 1990, developed by Taito)
- Taro's Quest (NES, 1990, cancelled North American release of JaJaMaru Ninpou Chou)
- Gun Baron (Arcade, 1991)
- Squashed (NES, 1991, cancelled North American release of Ninja JaJaMaru: Ginga Daisakusen)
- War on Wheels (NES, 1991, developed by Sculptured Software)
- Soldam (NES, 1992)
- Super Strong Warriors (Arcade, 1993)
- Kick for the Goal (Arcade, 1994, prototype version of World PK Soccer)
- Super Circuit Red Zone (Arcade, 1995)
- Crossroads (1999, PC, developed by VR-1)
- Navy Force (2000, PS2)
- Rock'n 4 (2000, Japan-exclusive rhythm game)
- Carrier 2: The Next Mutation (2001, PS2)
- Lost Continents (2003, PC, developed by VR-1)
- World Championship Pool 2004 (2005, GameCube, North American release cancelled)
- Ninja JaJaMaru-kun: Pen wa Ken Yorimo Kyoushidegozaru (2006, DS)
