= A Witch's Tale =

2009 video game

- Developer: Hit Maker
- Publishers: JP: Nippon Ichi Software; NA: NIS America
- Platform: Nintendo DS
- Release: JP: 28 May 2009; NA: 6 October 2009
- Genre: Role-playing
- Mode: Single-player

A Witch's Tale (Note: Released in Japan as Witch Tale: The Apprentice Witch and the Seven Princesses (ウィッチテイル 見習い魔女と7人の姫, Witchi Teiru Minarai Majo to Shichinin no Hime)) is a 2009 video game for the Nintendo DS. It was developed by Hit Maker and published by Nippon Ichi Software.

== Gameplay ==
Gameplay consists of a mixture of battles and puzzle solving: the player must complete certain tasks in order to proceed to the next world in the game. Battles are fought by having players correctly draw runes with the stylus on the Nintendo DS touch screen to attack enemies. Monsters appear randomly in the game and in certain situations such as boss battles. Players are given the opportunity to collect various dolls throughout the game, several of which are based upon the characters in the game. The dolls have the ability to launch attacks, give boosts to various stats, or heal the player depending on the type of doll. The dolls can become damaged, making repair necessary.

== Plot ==
The game's plot is set within several different worlds, many of which are loosely based upon various fictional characters and stories such as The Little Mermaid, The Wizard of Oz, and Alice in Wonderland. Thousands of years prior to the start of the game, powerful witches existed below the surface of the earth in a world that was filled with darkness and decay. They soon grew jealous of the beautiful surface world and with the assistance of the Eld Witch, invaded the surface world. The ensuing battle was filled with violence and bloodshed, but was stopped after the mysterious and magical Queen Alice sealed the witches away by using their own rune magic against them. After the battle, rune magic was considered to be lost and forbidden.

Liddell is one of several young girls that are training at an academy to become a witch. She is, however, often scolded for her rude behavior and her attitudes towards the magic classes, which she views as inferior to ancient magics. After speaking with a classmate and the witch Babayaga, Liddell is informed of the whereabouts of a magic castle that potentially holds an ancient magic. She proceeds to the castle despite warnings from Babayaga, where she discovers the vampire Loue, whom she awakens after breaking into a nearby room in search of magic. The room actually contains a magic book containing the sealed Eld Witch, who takes Liddell's break in as a chance to escape. Liddell is then enlisted by Loue to go to seven different kingdoms and rescue the princesses in each one.

During the course of her travels Liddell learns additional rune magic and gains the ability to use dolls, one of which is her personal doll Dayna, to boost various stats and abilities, as well as to cast various magics. As she rescues each princess, Liddell is given their personal sigils. When combined, the six sigils will allow Liddell to travel to Alice's world and confront the Eld Witch. Various elements about Liddell's past and personality are revealed, such as Liddell's abandonment as a child, the resurgence of memories where she was rescued by what appears to be Queen Alice, and her admission that her desire to become the strongest witch stems from a belief that if she becomes strong that her mother will return to her. It's eventually revealed that the six kingdoms were created by Queen Alice as a form of added protection for the seal she placed on the Eld Witch, and that she also descended into the underworld to serve as a permanent watchman and guardian against any potential further action.

Liddell eventually manages to gather all six sigils and defeat the Eld Witch, but in the process the Eld Witch apparently kills Alice. Liddell is told that she must become the new Alice, but after the credits, Liddell wakes up and it's revealed the events of the game were both a dream and a test from Queen Alice to ascertain her worthiness. Meanwhile, Queen Alice and Loue discuss Liddell's powers, the possibility that Liddell is a creature of the underworld, and plans to continue to monitor her in the future.

In a second replay, additional content is unlocked that has Liddell traveling back in time and befriending a young girl named Anne. She is eventually revealed to be the Eld Witch before she became consumed with the need for revenge, as Queen Alice refused to reincarnate her daughters. After a second battle, the Eld Witch reverts to Anne and remembers her friendship with Liddell before turning to ashes. Upset, Liddell wanders through a maze forest and comes across the Mad Hatter, who explains that death is not permanent in this world and it's possible she might see Anne in the future. Liddell then attends a tea party with the six princesses from each kingdom who explain the game's events are a real dream that Queen Alice created, and they hope to meet her in real life someday. Liddell gives Loue a spell book containing all of the rune magic she has learned, saying that she doesn't need it to become a powerful witch. In return he gives her a necklace that Liddell is showing to be wearing when she wakes up in her school's library, where she has lost her memories of the events of the game.

== Characters ==
- Liddell: The main character, Liddell is a witch-in-training that accidentally releases the Eld Witch while searching for strong magic.
- Loue: An ancient vampire that was guarding the book holding the sealed Eld Witch. He accompanies Liddell on her journey in bat form.
- Eld Witch: An ancient witch that is said to have invaded the upper world due to her jealousy of its beauty. Liddell befriends the Eld Witch when she was just a young girl named Anne, which gives the player the game's true ending.

== Development ==
After releasing Disgaea and Puchi Puchi Virus for the Nintendo DS, NIS America announced in the summer of 2008 they would also remake Rhapsody: A Musical Adventure and release a new game, A Witch's Tale, in October 2008. Nintendo Power described the game as an "action-RPG with a The Nightmare Before Christmas-esque art style" in their August 2008 issue, before they had a chance to play it. A Witch's Tale was developed by Hit Maker, known for Blade Dancer: Lineage of Light and Dragoneer's Aria and is their first Nintendo DS game. According to Haru Akenaga, the President of NIS America, A Witch's Tale targeted a North American audience. The game was initially planned for a Q4 2008 release, but was pushed back to 2009.

== Reception ==
Reception

Aggregate score
Aggregator	Score
Metacritic	50/100

Review scores
Publication	Score
Edge	4/10
Famitsu	25/40
GamePro	2.5/5
GameRevolution	D−
GameSpot	4/10
GameZone	6.3/10
IGN	6/10
Nintendo Power	4/10
RPGamer	3/5
RPGFan	62%

The game received "mixed" reviews according to the review aggregation website Metacritic. Reviewers typically praised the game's story line while criticizing the game's battle system as "slow" and "lackluster". IGN commented that "for a game that starts off so strongly with its excellent theme, characters, visuals and audio, it just completely falls off in the critical category of actual gameplay" and that "getting to see and interact with any of the interesting elements means slogging through a whole lot of sluggish battles that really feel like the Plan B option we know they were." RPGamer gave it a mixed review, a month before it was released Stateside. In Japan, Famitsu gave it a score of 25 out of 40.
