= Lowrider (disambiguation) =

A lowrider is a car or truck modified to have less ground clearance than most other cars.

Lowrider may also refer to:

== Music ==
=== Bands ===
- Lowrider (Australian band), a hip-hop soul band
- Lowrider (Swedish band), a stoner-rock band
- Lowrider Band, an American band

=== Songs ===
- "Low Rider", a song by War
- "Lowrider" (Cypress Hill song)

== Other ==
- Lowriders (film), a 2016 American drama
- Low Rider, one of the ring names of professional wrestler Matt Barela
- Lowrider (video game), a 2002 video game made for PlayStation 2
- Lowrider bicycle, a modified bicycle in the style of a lowrider car
- Low rider bicycle luggage carrier, a way to carry luggage on a bicycle to with a low center of gravity
- Lowrider (magazine), an American monthly magazine on automobiles
- Nazi Lowriders, American prison gang
