= Ninja Kazan =

1988 video game

- Developer: Jaleco
- Publisher: Jaleco
- Composer: Tsukasa Tawada
- Platform: Arcade
- Release: JP: September 1988
- Genre: Platform
- Modes: Single-player, multiplayer

Ninja Kazan, released in Japan as Iga Ninjutsuden: Goshin no Sho (Note: Japanese: 伊賀忍術伝 五神の書, Hepburn: Iga Ninjutsuden Goshin no Sho), is a 1988 action-platform video game developed and published by Jaleco for arcades. It was released only in Japan in September 1988. It is the first appearance of Kazan, a recurring character in Jaleco's Rushing Beat series of beat 'em up games. Due to racially insensitive content, the game was not released outside Japan until Hamster Corporation released the game as part of their Arcade Archives series for the Nintendo Switch and PlayStation 4 in February 2021.

== Gameplay ==
Ninja Kazan is a side-scrolling platformer similar in style to Sega's Shinobi and Tecmo's Ninja Gaiden. The player controls the Ninja Kazan who navigates various open-ended levels, defeating enemies and retrieving five lost items around the world. The player is armed with a sword, which can be replaced with long-distance weapons such as shurikens, a kusarigama and knives that are lost after death, in addition to magic powers that can be used by holding down the attack button; the time required to hold down buttons vary depending on the powers' strength. Collectibles such as additional weapons can be found in various areas of the levels due to their open-ended nature.
