= Flying Ace (disambiguation) =

A flying ace is a military aviator credited with shooting down several enemy aircraft.

Flying Ace or Fighter Ace may also refer to:

- Flying Aces (magazine)
- Fighter Ace (video game)
- The Flying Ace, 1926 movie
- Flying Aces (roller coaster), a roller coaster at Ferrari World in Abu Dhabi, United Arab Emirates
