= Exerion =

1983 video game

- Japanese arcade flyer
- Developer: Kawa Denshi Giken
- Publishers: JP: Jaleco; NA: Taito; EU: Electrocoin
- Series: Exerion
- Platforms: Arcade, SG-1000, Famicom, MSX, mobile phone
- Release: Arcade: JP: September 1983; NA: November 1983; EU: 1983; SG-1000: JP: March 1984; NZ: June 1984; Famicom: JP: November 30, 1984
- Genre: Shoot 'em up
- Modes: Single-player, multiplayer

Exerion (Note: Japanese: エクセリオン, Hepburn: Ekuserion) is a 1983 shoot 'em up video game developed by Kawa Denshi Giken and published by Jaleco for arcades. It was released in North America by Taito. The player controls a starship and must fire at enemies on the screen while avoiding projectiles. The game uses a pseudo-3D scrolling background, giving a sense of depth, and the player's ship has a sense of inertia while it is being controlled with the joystick.

Exerion was ported to the MSX, Family Computer, and SG-1000. Two sequels were released.

== Gameplay ==
Arcade screenshot

Exerion features parallax effects and inertia simulation. The player shoots formations of bizarre alien amoeba, egg-throwing birds and Pterosauric creatures, as well as UFOs while flying over the surface of a planet. The player has two types of guns: a slow double shot (unlimited) and a fast single shot (limited).

== Reception ==
Reception

Review score
Publication	Score
Tilt	4/5

In Japan, Game Machine listed Exerion as the top-grossing new table arcade cabinet in November 1983, and then the top-grossing tablet cabinet in December 1983.

== Legacy ==
The Family Computer version of the game is included in the compilation Jaleco Collection Vol. 1 for the PlayStation in 2003, as well as in the Game Boy Advance game JaJaMaru Jr. Denshoki Jaleco Memorial, along with five other Jaleco Family Computer games. The original arcade version was later released by Hamster Corporation as part of their Arcade Archives series for the PlayStation 4 on October 23, 2014 in Japan and on July 7, 2015 in North America and also on the Nintendo Switch in 2020.

Two sequels to the game were released. Exerion II: Zorni was released for the MSX in 1984 alongside a port of the original arcade game. The second, Exerizer, was released for arcades in 1987, which was released in North America by Nichibutsu under the title Sky Fox. The player's ship, the Fighter EX, is a playable character in Jaleco's Game Tengoku series.
