= The Peace Keepers =

1993 video game

- North American cover art
- Developer: Jaleco
- Publisher: Jaleco
- Series: Rushing Beat
- Platform: Super Nintendo Entertainment System
- Release: JP: December 17, 1993; NA: March 17, 1994
- Genre: Beat 'em up
- Modes: Single-player, multiplayer

The Peace Keepers, known in Japan as Rushing Beat Syura (ラッシング・ビート修羅, Rasshingu Bīto Shura) is a 1993 beat 'em up video game developed and published by Jaleco for the Super Nintendo Entertainment System in 1993. It is the third game in the Rushing Beat, following Rival Turf! and Brawl Brothers, although the three games were localized as unrelated titles in North America.

The game distinguishes itself from the rest of the series by shifting focus from the two main characters of the previous games (Douglas Bild and Rick Norton in Japan). It also adds a variety of new features including new special attacks, branching gameplay paths and multiple endings.

Like the previous games in the series, The Peace Keepers features various changes from the original Japanese version. The story was altered, as were various aspects of the game's presentation and gameplay.

The Peace Keepers was added to the Nintendo Classics service in September 2020.

== Gameplay ==
There are six selectable characters in the game; up to two players can play the main game mode simultaneously. A versus mode is also available, in which two to four players can face each other with support for the Super Multitap.

The main mode of the game is a standard beat'em up game in which players face a slew of enemies, each with their own strengths and weaknesses. The controls are the standard punch, special attack, taunt, jump and block. There are also super moves. The Peace Keepers has multiple endings with multiple branching paths, each path with its own boss fights and cut scenes.

== Plot ==
The manual of the North American release details the localized story. The game takes place in the year 2015, after the "economic wars" of 2011. The Deutschland Moldavia (DM) corporation rules most of the world and its resources, conducting mysterious genetic experiments. Four people affected by DM's research, Flynn, Echo, Al and Prokop, seek revenge on the corporation for its wrongdoings.

== Characters ==
These are the names of the characters for the American game, with the Japanese names right next to them, followed by their back-stories in the Western version of the game. The first four characters are playable from the beginning; Norton and the M-Frame/Orbot must be encountered to be selectable. The "Special Moves" of the first four characters hit all enemies on-screen.

- Flynn/Dick - A man used as an experiment for DM who can transform into muscle bound super being when injured severely. His mentor (and his best friend's surrogate father) Harry was beaten to death by a couple of DM thugs. Since then, Flynn has made it his mission to stop DM. Flynn is a balanced attacker whose throws are effective. His special move is the Dragon Wave (changed to an Electric Shock in the Western version).
- Echo/Elfin - As a young girl, she saw her grandfather (who was a scientist) murdered by a DM thug when he refused to enslave people with the help of science. Upon seeing this murder, Echo went into a fit and tried vainly to fight against the thug who then ordered her to be taken away and put in a prison. Fortunately, a man named Harry came and rescued her and adopted her as his daughter from that point. Echo is quick but weak, but she can execute a Frankensteiner throw. Her special move is the Bird Storm (changed to a Yaaaay! scream)
- Al/Kythring - A military man. While on a mission, he noticed one of his men who had just previously did a DM job was acting erratic and very aggressive. His brother tried to explain it as something was wrong with him because of it. After killing a man in front of him, he and his brother disappeared after the incident. Al decided to check out the DM Corporation to see what was wrong. Al has a bazooka on his back to shoot enemies, and uses mostly grabbing moves such as piledrivers. His Special Move is the Assault Tiger.
- Prokop/Jimmy - A very strong (albeit slow) muscular man who wears a red band around his arm that was left behind from when his sister Amy was kidnapped by the DM Corporation. After they took her, Prokop set off to DM to try to get her back. Prokop can channel the power of electricity and do wrestling throws more powerful than Al's. His special move is the Thunder Edge.
- Rick Norton - (called Hack in Brawl Brothers and Jack Flack in Rival Turf) is pursuing his kidnapped sister Maria although this isn't explored in the American version of the game like it is the Japanese version which includes a letter from her in Rick's good ending. In this game, Norton has lost the shin bandages but his German suplex now hits twice in a row, and his multiple punch now ends in a "Dragon Punch" uppercut.
- Orbot/Metal Frame (M-Frame) - A yellow-painted combat robot designed and manufactured by the DM Corporation that was built and programmed by a defecting scientist, who assembled him with spare pieces that were smuggled out, to help take down the DM Corporation. Orbot can grab enemies more easily due to its long arms, and can burn them with a blue flame. Like Al, he can also shoot bullets at enemies. Other Orbots will appear as mini-bosses throughout the game.

Douglas Bild, known in Rival Turf as Oozie Nelson and in Brawl Brothers as Slash, makes a short cameo appearance at the start of the game's first level.

== Localization ==
The USA version of the game modified several things from the original Japanese version such as removing most of the music and simplifying the special moves' animation. The story was also changed entirely from the original version.

Although the Western versions of the game sever all ties to the previous Rushing Beat games, a reference to Brawl Brothers is made at one point. A character that looks very similar to Lord J from Brawl Brothers can be fought at the Musashi Plaza. If he is defeated by Norton, Norton will ask if he's Lord J and the guy will say that he was once known by that name.

Many of the character and place names in the North American version are derived from esoteric real-world, literary, and cultural sources. This includes the villain Iago (from Shakespeare) and the weakest and most prolific enemy in the early stages of the game known as Fnord (from Robert Anton Wilson's books, The Illuminatus! Trilogy).

Levels with these name conventions include the stage Stalag 17 which takes place in the ruined Deutschland Moldavia labs; the street level "Snake Plissken Ave." (from the Kurt Russell character); and "Ozymandias Island" (from the Shelley poem). The "Roy D. Tutto Hospital" level features a misspelling of "Ray D. Tutto," Robin Williams' pseudonym credit in The Adventures of Baron Munchausen. The Pirate Dock known as "Agrajag Cavern" is named for a minor character in the radio comedy series The Hitchhiker's Guide to the Galaxy. "Alan Bradley Airport" is likely a reference to Bruce Boxleitner's character from the Tron series.

Two poems are also referenced: The final stage "Abandon all hope, ye who enter here!" is derived from Dante Alighieri's epic poem The Divine Comedy; and the text shown in Flynn's ending (if Norton is unavailable) is a quote from T. S. Eliot's poem The Love Song of J. Alfred Prufrock.

== Reception ==
Reception

Review scores
Publication	Score
Electronic Gaming Monthly	7/10, 6/10, 4/10, 7/10, 8/10
Famitsu	6/10, 6/10, 7/10, 5/10
Game Players	78%
Super Play	66%
Total!	4-
Super Control	54%
Super Gamer	50/100
VideoGames	6/10

The Peace Keepers received a 19.5/30 score in a readers' poll conducted by Super Famicom Magazine. The game received mixed reviews from critics.
