= Dragonseeds =

1998 video game

- Developer: Jaleco
- Publisher: Jaleco
- Composers: Kenichi Arakawa, Ryo Yamazaki
- Platform: PlayStation
- Release: JP: August 6, 1998; NA: September 30, 1998
- Genres: Tactical, raising/construction
- Modes: Single-player, multiplayer

Dragonseeds, released in Japan as Dragon Seeds: Saishū Shinka Keitai (ドラゴンシーズ ～最終進化形態～, Doragon Shīzu ～Saishū Shinka Keitai～; lit. "Dragon Seeds: Final Evolution Form"), is a 1998 tactical role-playing video game developed and published by Jaleco for the PlayStation. The player must clone a dragon and train it to fight. The player gets to choose from five basic dragon types and two secret dragons. The game also allows the player to receive extra dragons through the saves files of certain games, if the memory card is placed at the second slot. The game also allows a two-player mode, where each player can battle each other with their own dragons.

== Gameplay ==
The premise of the game is to raise a dragon and have it participate in battle. After acquiring high enough stats the dragons evolve into more powerful forms. There are three elemental types in the game: Fire, aqua, and storm. Fire being basic flame control, Aqua referring to water or ice abilities, and Storm refers to electrical powers. Each dragon has an element it is born with, and each species of dragon has certain limitations on how many elements it can be. The elements work in a rock, paper, scissors way of play: Fire being strong against storm, but being weak to water. Storm being strong against water, but weak to fire. Water being strong against fire, but being weak to storm. The goal of the game is to raise a dragon to compete in the Arena with the aim of being the best dragonsage in the land. The higher the rank, the tougher the competition and the more prize money involved. The player can move around the map as needed, but the entirety of the game takes place within a single city.

The game supports two-player combat as well, with two modes, regular and quick battle. Quick battle allows for pre-registered dragons to be used as opposed to having to raise the player's own and is comparable to the Battle Now mode of Pokémon Colosseum.

Battle

The battles of Dragon Seeds are fought in traditional 1 vs 1 matches, on a semi rotating screen between the player and the challenger's dragons. The battle is fought in turn-based rock, paper, scissors rotations with a timer that counts down during each player's phase of action. The player can command the dragon to either move forward, backward, use a physical or magical attack, defend, or taunt. The player must equip the dragon with a weapon and shield, called a reflector, for the dragon to be able to enter combat. In battle, there are 3 main positions in which the dragon can be in: Close, Mid, and Far range. Each dragon can be at max 2 ranges apart from their opponent. Only at close range can a dragon successfully perform a physical attack. At mid and far ranges, the dragon can perform magical attacks attuned with their element, or taunt. The player must choose correct judgment and a bit of luck to win battles successfully.

During battle, if the player anticipates defeat, they have the option to forfeit the match. Forfeiting will cause the player to lose, but will spare their dragon's life. If the dragon's HP reaches 0, it has the possibility of dying. If the player's dragon dies during a battle it will be lost permanently, however if its DNA cell it was last in is empty it might still have the DNA remnants in it and there is a chance it can be re-synthesized to the last point it was in the cell, but it loses the weapons it had.

Types

There are 6 different types of dragons: Saurian, Winged, Beetle, Crustacean, Wasp, and Natura, plus two, Spirit and Evil, which are secret and are unlocked after fulfilling special conditions. Out of these types, there are three flavors of dragon per type; called Normal, Super and Mutant, with different appearances. For example, the Saurian dragons can come in either Red or Blue coloration with slightly different spike orientation. Their evolutions are also affected by which flavor the player receives.

- The Saurian dragons are dinosauric dragons which are bipedal and evolve into more fierce-looking versions of themselves, gaining spikes and size. Saurian dragons are able to be in all 3 of the element types.
- The Winged Dragons are the most reminiscent of true dragons in the game. They are, as their name states, dragons with wings. They are always in the air until they die. One version of the Winged Dragon has only one eye, like a cyclops. Their evolutions are slightly bigger versions with immense wings. Some resemble birds more than reptiles. They are not limited to any elements, they can become all three.
- The Beetle dragons are shaped nothing like mythical dragons but are described as "myriopods". They have 4-6 legs they stand on and use two to wield their weapon and reflector. Their evolutions are bigger, more armored versions of themselves. They are limited to Fire and Storm elements.
- The Crustacean Dragons also do not look like reptilian dragons, but have the front part of a crab as their head/body including claws and their legs are composed of small legs in a circle that undulate in and out as it moves and/or stands. Their evolutions are taller and fiercer versions of themselves. Their elements are limited to Aqua.
- The Wasp dragon is shaped like a slightly advanced bee, with a more defined separation between the thorax and abdomen. They are continuously flying and hold their weapon and reflector in two of their six legs. Their evolutions are fiercer versions of themselves. They only come in aqua and storm elements.
- Natura dragons are a statuesque type, resembling humanoid robots with a huge oval for a torso. Some varieties have one eye. Their evolutions are bulkier versions of themselves. They only come in Storm elements, like robots.
- Spirit dragons are often humanoid, but having heads or tails of animals. They usually have two arms and always are floating in midair.
- Evil dragons are possibly the furthest depiction from a traditional dragon. They are usually living doors or gateways, such as wooden doors and coffins with arms. They float in midair and evolve into larger, more elaborate objects.

Synthesis and evolution

Dragons are made by DNA synthesis in a genetics lab. This is done by choosing a dragon type and then combining given phrases to specify the element/stats. Certain phrases give more power than others, or rather produce more specialized effects. They can also determine what flavor of dragon type the player receives. There are four evolutions generally, from Baby, to Adult, Senior, then Old. The dragon will cocoon itself for a small amount of time when undergoing each transformation. However, each type of dragon also has the potential to undergo a fifth evolution to become a "mutant dragon" which is uber but will die in a short while or the ultimate legendary sixth evolution to a "super dragon", which is described as a status where the dragon becomes immortal, and ceases to age. Dragons of this caliber are far from their traditional forms, mostly resembling humanoid spirits. They are encountered in the game's top tier battles. As a bonus, the game allows for memory card synthesis of dragons. If the player has another memory card inserted into the second slot with save data from certain PlayStation games (such as Tekken 3, Croc: Legend of the Gobbos, or Crash Bandicoot 2: Cortex Strikes Back) they can then enter a corresponding code in-game to receive a special dragon.

== Story ==
The Story begins in an unknown world (supposedly Earth) where scientists have discovered an unknown remnant of DNA with no classification. Several years later they identify it and call it a "dragon". Soon after, an entire dragon is successfully cloned from the remnant. Dragons are mass-produced via cloning labs, and dragon sparring has become a popular sport. The player is shown a picture of Warm City, the player's new home, and has supposedly come to this city to make a name for themselves in the sport of dragon battling.

When the player starts the game, they are introduced to the battle system via a story relevant tutorial. The player receives a saurian dragon pre-equipped with a weapon and a reflector. A powerful dragon sage comes by and shows the player character his dragon and asks to spar. He doesn't take no for an answer. It is impossible to defeat this dragon and as a result the player's dragon dies. Players can then go to the Cloning Lab and are able to raise as many dragons as you want. The goal of the game is to win in tournaments and get up to the highest rank to defeat the man who first defeated the player. Winning in tournaments gives the player money, prestige, and access to better equipment as well. Inside this world, there is an in-game clock and calendar that changes with time passed in the various locations on the map. The day begins at 6 AM and ends at 9 PM, when the player is assumed to sleep. Shops and tourneys close at certain times of the day, so there is a limit on how much the player can accomplish in one day. Tourneys end at 3 PM, and each tourney depending on the rank challenged could take up at least 3 hours of in game time. The player can also choose to speed up time by choosing to sleep at their apartment for a number of hours or a day. There are a few major areas in the city in which the player has access to, each with a notable NPC. They include the cloning lab, an apartment for item and money storage, a weapon/shield shop, the official arena, the junk shop for discount/rare weapons, the sanctuary for capturing/releasing dragons, a training area, and an unofficial arena for battling.

== Reception ==
Reception

Aggregate score
Aggregator	Score
GameRankings	59%

Review scores
Publication	Score
AllGame	2/5
Electronic Gaming Monthly	5.25/10
Famitsu	28/40
Game Informer	5.25/10
GamePro	4/5
GameSpot	5.6/10
IGN	6.9/10
Next Generation	2/5

The game received "mixed" reviews according to the review aggregation website GameRankings. Next Generation said that "the heart of any breeding/combat simulation is very basic, and it's the only window dressing that separates Monster Rancher from Lemonade Stand," and that the game was "little more than a minimalist polygon engine grafted on top of a series of static screens." In Japan, Famitsu gave it a score of 28 out of 40.
