= Best Bout Boxing =

1994 video game

- Developer: Jaleco
- Publisher: Jaleco
- Platform: Arcade
- Release: JP: 1994; US: 1994
- Genre: Traditional boxing
- Modes: Single-player, multiplayer
- Arcade system: Jaleco Mega System 32 hardware

Best Bout Boxing is a boxing arcade game released by Jaleco in 1994, where boxers have to compete for the fictional "1993 Worldfreeweight Championship" (no weight limitation).

== List of characters ==
Grute Smith battles Carolde First

- Jose Hum-Dinger from Mexico
- Biff Vulgue from Australia
- Carolde First from England
- Jyoji Horiuchi from Japan
- Kim Hi-Soo from South Korea
- Thamalatt Zip from Thailand
- Grute Smith from the USA
- Draef Varona from Russia (final opponent; unplayable)
