= Avenging Spirit =

1991 video game

- Promotional flyer for Avenging Spirit
- Developer: C.P.Brain
- Publisher: Jaleco
- Platforms: Arcade, Game Boy
- Release: Arcade: JP: May 1991; NA: October 1991; Game Boy: JP: November 6, 1992; NA: December 1992; EU: 1992
- Genre: Platform
- Modes: Single-player, multiplayer

Avenging Spirit, released in Japan as Phantasm, (Note: ファンタズム (Fantazumu)) is a 1991 platform video game developed by C.P.Brain and published by Jaleco for arcades. It was released in Japan in May 1991 and in North America in October 1991.

== Plot ==
During a walk with his girlfriend, the player is ambushed by agents of a mysterious crime syndicate who take his girlfriend away and shoot him to death. Now, as a wandering spirit with the ability to possess most others, he is summoned by his girlfriend's father (who researches ghost energy) and is given a mission to save her from the mysterious crime syndicate holding her hostage, enabling the player to rest in peace.

Screenshot of Avenging Spirit

Coincidentally, the crime syndicate is also researching ghost energy, and they kidnapped the girl in an effort to force her father to cooperate with them. The player must fight through six stages to infiltrate the evil syndicate's base, collecting three keys on stages 2, 5, and 6. If the player has all three keys upon reaching the final leg of Stage 6, he can open the girl's cell and possess her to help her fight her way out. If not, he must abandon her and face the syndicate's leader alone. After the syndicate's leader is defeated, the base blows up, and the player ends up on a grassy field as his spirit's power fades. If the player fails to save the girl, she presumably dies in the explosion and he expects to see her in the afterlife as he fades away. If the player does save her, she approaches the field, and the player expresses a wish for her future happiness as he vanishes.

== Gameplay ==
Players can possess one of four characters with unique abilities at the start of the game, but the library of enemies expands and changes with each level. Players either attack or possess enemies, collect power-ups, and defeat bosses to advance.

== Reception ==
In Japan, Game Machine listed Avenging Spirit on their July 1, 1991 issue as being the seventeenth most-successful table arcade unit of the month.

Sinclair User called Avenging Spirit a "superior action game with a rather odd scenario." They praised the longevity of the game, but admitted that it had a steep learning curve which might not appeal to more casual players. British gaming magazine The One reviewed Avenging Spirit in 1991, stating that it "isn't destined to be a classic", but it has "originality and nice touches".

== Ports and re-releases ==
On December 14, 2010, DotEmu SAS released an iOS port of the game. The Game Boy version was re-released on the Nintendo 3DS eShop's Virtual Console download service in Japan on June 7, 2011 and was released worldwide on August 11, 2011. A cartridge for original Game Boy systems was re-released by Limited Run Games in 2022. A re-release developed by Shinyuden and City Connection and published by Ratalaika Games for Nintendo Switch, PlayStation 4, PlayStation 5, Xbox One, Xbox Series X/S, and Evercade was released on July 29, 2022.
