= Rival Turf! =

1992 video game

- North American cover art of Rival Turf!
- Developer: Jaleco
- Publisher: Jaleco
- Designer: Ryoichi Kuramochi
- Programmers: Takeshi Ohara; Hitoshi Sekiya; Manabu Shirato
- Artists: Nobuyuki Kuramochi; Keiichi Maekawa; Tadahiko Watanabe; Masahito Takahashi
- Composers: Yasuhiko Takashiba; Atsuyoshi Isemura
- Series: Rushing Beat
- Platform: Super Nintendo Entertainment System
- Release: JP: March 27, 1992; NA: April 23, 1992; EU: 1993
- Genre: Beat'em up
- Modes: Single-player, multiplayer

Rival Turf!, released in Japan as Rushing Beat (Japanese: ラッシング・ビート), is a 1992 beat'em up video game developed and published by Jaleco for the Super Nintendo Entertainment System. It was later rereleased on the Wii and Wii U's Virtual Console and the Nintendo Classics service. The game is the first installment in the Rushing Beat trilogy, which also includes Brawl Brothers and The Peace Keepers, although the games were localized as unrelated titles in North America.

== Plot ==
Jack Flak's girlfriend Heather has been kidnapped by Big Al and his gang the Street Kings. He enlists the help of his friend, police officer Oswald "Oozie" Nelson to rescue his girlfriend and rid the city from the reign of the Street Kings once and for all. They start out by heading to the sports stadium to find out more information and locate Big Al's hideout.

=== Japanese version ===
One night, Rick Norton is walking down the streets of the city when he was surprised by a gun in the darkness. The mystery man behind the gun said that Norton's sister had an important video tape and was being held hostage. A new stimulant was being sold in epidemic amounts throughout the city and was only first manufactured a few years ago. Realizing that the organization's mystery was shrouded other than their sales of illegal stimulants, Norton has seen the city become slowly devastated over a period of time. He heads to the city stadium in an attempt to rescue his sister Maria with the help of his friend, Douglas Bild.

== Gameplay ==
Flak is using his flying kick attack against Bullet, one of the weakest enemies in Rival Turf!.

Jack Flak (Rick Norton in Japan) or "Oozie" Nelson (Douglas Bild in Japan) are selected in a one or two player mode, to defeat a plethora of enemies using punches, kicks and various weapons collected throughout the course of the game. Jack Flak is the hero who is out to rescue his girlfriend Heather, with the flying kick and the back drop as his specialty attacks. Oswald "Oozie" Nelson is a police officer who uses powerful professional wrestling moves.

There is an "angry" mode where the character becomes temporarily invincible and more powerful after taking a certain amount of damage. Moving the character is done using the four-direction controller and each move (attack, jump, special attack) is done using three of the four available buttons near the movement keys.

In the two-player versus mode, the player who wins two wins out of three rounds wins the entire match.

== Localization ==
Compared to the original Japanese game, the North American version removes the introductory story and credits, and shortens the ending. When each character is defeated, the Japanese version replaces their icon with the Japanese word for death (死) while the North American version shows a simple "X". Another feature unique to the Japanese version is the ability to change the number of lives and continues that the player can use.

The fictional city of "Neo Cisco" used in the Japanese version became the real-life city of Los Angeles in the North American version.

== Reception ==
Reception

Aggregate score
Aggregator	Score
GameRankings	48.25%

Review scores
Publication	Score
AllGame	2/5
Computer and Video Games	72/100
Electronic Gaming Monthly	6/10, 7/10, 7/10, 5/10
Famitsu	5/10, 5/10, 6/10, 4/10
Game Informer	8/10, 8/10, 9.25/10
Nintendo Power	3.45/5
Official Nintendo Magazine	48/100
Super Play	58%
Total!	70%
VideoGames & Computer Entertainment	7/10
Control	60%
Game Zone	60/100
SNES Force	55%
Super Action	81%
The Super Famicom	70/100
Super Gamer	51%
Super Pro	51/100

Rival Turf! received a 20.97/30 score in a 1993 readers' poll conducted by Super Famicom Magazine, ranking among Super Famicom titles at the number 137 spot. The game received mixed reception from critics, holding a rating of 48.25% based on six reviews according to review aggregator GameRankings.

In 2010, Damien McFerran of Nintendo Life reviewed the title negatively, calling it "desperately short on originality" with "truly uninspiring gameplay". He supposed that the publisher's main strategy was to capitalize on the lack of two-player functionality in Capcom's superior competing game Final Fight, while simultaneously plagiarizing it. He described the effort as "inferior ... in practically every single way imaginable" to that "infinitely more distinguished" game. He describes the characters as "painfully similar" to and "obvious replicas" of those in Final Fight, though they "look like they've wandered off the set of a Vanilla Ice music video" and have completely unrealistic movements, collision detection, and physics. The only redeeming qualities he found to the entire game are the presence of two-player mode and the ability to run.

In 2011, IGN rated Rival Turf! at 4 out of 10, calling it "an almost entirely forgettable beat-'em-up with a boring premise, bland music and partially broken gameplay". The review laments "stiff animation, a lacking storyline and characters that have no discernable personality"; and the "poor collision detection" is said to define the game as an overall failure at "the most critical component of a brawler". The review states that this game lacks even the minorly distinctive features of its numerous and similar competition, generally summarizing it as being "as vanilla as the brawler genre can be".

In 2010, Nintendo Power also ridiculed the box cover art, saying that "The marketing people on this game actually had a pretty outside-the-box idea, which should have really stayed off the box. After all, who is the target audience going to find more intimidating than thugs their own age?". Super Gamer Magazine gave a review score of 51% stating "Too few combat moves, jerky graphics and not enough challenge. The only good point is the simultaneous two-player mode.
