= Tetris Plus =

1995 video game

- North American Saturn cover art
- Developer: Jaleco (Note: Saturn, PlayStation, and Game Boy versions developed by Natsume Co., Ltd.)
- Publishers: Jaleco: Saturn, PlayStation; JP/NA: Jaleco; EU: JVC Music Europe Game Boy; JP: Jaleco; NA/EU: Nintendo
- Composer: Iku Mizutani
- Series: Tetris
- Platforms: Arcade, Sega Saturn, PlayStation, Game Boy
- Release: December 1995: Arcade; JP: December 1995; NA: March 1996 Saturn; JP: August 30, 1996; NA: October 18, 1996; PAL: 1997 PlayStation; JP: September 6, 1996; NA: October 18, 1996; EU: October 1997 Game Boy; JP: December 27, 1996; EU: 1996; NA: August 1997; AU: August 1997
- Genre: Puzzle
- Modes: Single-player, multiplayer

Tetris Plus (Japanese: テトリスプラス, Hepburn: Tetorisu Purasu) is a 1995 puzzle video game developed and published by Jaleco for arcades. An entry in the Tetris series, it was Jaleco's seventh title developed for their 32-bit Mega System board and was subsequently ported to the Sega Saturn, PlayStation, and Game Boy in 1996. It followed by the arcade sequel Tetris Plus 2 in 1997.

== Gameplay ==
Arcade version screenshot

The game consists of two main modes, Classic Mode and Puzzle Mode. Classic Mode is a standard Tetris game. Puzzle Mode is a mission-based mode where the player must clear a pre-arranged puzzle layout in a limited time. Also included is an editor for making Puzzle Mode levels, and capability for competitive multiplayer in either game mode. The console versions also have a two-player Versus Mode, which is essentially puzzle mode with two players racing for the finish line.

=== Puzzle Mode ===
The biggest addition to Tetris Plus is the Puzzle Mode. The player starts with the first zone, the Egypt; later there are in order: Angkor Wat, Maya and Knossos. The final area, Atlantis, is unlocked by successfully completing the other four stages. Each of the four locations has a different level set and all of the zones, including Atlantis, have 20 levels each, for a total of 100 levels. Once the game starts, the player is presented with a cluster of pre-placed bricks, and a professor character who enters the play-area through a disappearing gate and gets trapped along with a spiked ceiling. The objective is to get the professor to fall to the bottom, by placing blocks and clearing lines, before the spiked ceiling at the top comes down and crushes him. Two blocks wide and tall, he will aimlessly walk forward until he bumps into a block, after which he turns around and walks the other way. If he comes across a gap that is large enough for him to fit through, he will fall down onto the blocks below him; if he falls from a great height, he will be temporarily stunned upon landing. Conversely, if blocks are placed on top of him, he will climb up them until he reaches the top.

Upon starting the level, the spiked ceiling will start at the top of the play area. About once every eighteen seconds, it will move down one notch, slowly taking away workable space. The player is able to make the ceiling go back up, however, if they can clear three or four rows at once. The ceiling will also destroy any placed blocks that are in its way; this can be used to remove any unwanted pieces until the piece the player wants appears. If the timer reaches 125 seconds, the ceiling will come down faster and the professor will get crushed. When the spikes are close to the professor, he will begin to run (or panic if he can't move), instead of just walking, until he is no longer in danger. The music will also become frantic until the professor falls to safety. If the professor hits the ceiling—whether by it descending onto him or him climbing into it—he will die, failing the level.

== Release ==
The game was published in 1996 in the United States by Jaleco, shortly after the company signed an agreement with Blue Planet Software giving Jaleco exclusive rights to publish Tetris games for the Saturn and PlayStation in the United States for the following two years. The PlayStation version sold well enough to be re-released for the Greatest Hits budget range.

== Reception ==
Reception

Review scores
Publication	Score
AllGame	SAT: 1.5/5
Electronic Gaming Monthly	SAT: 7.5/10
Famitsu	PS: 6/10, 4/10, 6/10, 6/10
GameSpot	SAT: 4.6/10
Next Generation	SAT: 3/5
Sega Saturn Magazine	SAT: 78%

In Japan, Game Machine listed Tetris Plus as the sixth most successful arcade game of January 1996.

Critical response to the Sega Saturn version was generally unenthusiastic. GameSpot editor Peter Criscuola referred to it as "a feeble attempt at reviving a legend", GamePro's Scary Larry as "a poor addition to the Tetris library", and Stephen Fulljames of Sega Saturn Magazine as "certainly nothing to get excited about." The four reviewers of Electronic Gaming Monthly were more positive than most, with Dan Hsu deeming it "a good package for even a part-time Tetris fan" and Sushi-X "a rewarding title with multiple levels of fun with the same classic challenge." The Puzzle Mode was met with disapproval for various reasons: Criscuola said it was too easy, Fulljames said it was frustratingly hard, Scary Larry said it didn't differ enough from the original Tetris, and a Next Generation critic said it simply wasn't as appealing as the original. Other frequent criticisms were that the graphics are subpar, and that the controls in all the modes are more difficult and counterintuitive than in previous versions of Tetris.

In a retrospective review, Allgame editor Jon Thompson called the Saturn version "boring".

== Sequel ==
Tetris Plus 2 (Japanese: テトリスプラス2, Hepburn: Tetorisu Purasu Tzū) is an arcade game released by Jaleco in 1997 as the only sequel to Tetris Plus. The main difference was that the professor's assistant was made playable, with her movement speed being faster.
