= JaJaMaru no Daibouken =

1986 video game

- Cover art
- Developer: Jaleco
- Publisher: Jaleco
- Series: Ninja JaJaMaru
- Platform: Family Computer
- Release: JP: August 22, 1986
- Genre: 2D action platformer
- Mode: Single-player

JaJaMaru no Daibouken (じゃじゃ丸の大冒険; "JaJaMaru's Great Adventure") is a Family Computer video game that was released exclusively for a Japanese market in 1986.

The player controls a red ninja, JaJaMaru, as he progress through a series of Japanesque levels defeating evil spirits that have spread across the land. The player can even ride his faithful frog if he can recover it from hiding.

== Items ==
Soul
Collect 50 of these for an extra life.
Transparent pill
The player becomes transparent and invincible against enemies in addition to their attacks.
Dolly
The player can jump longer distances and at higher speed.
Super Shuriken
Expands the range of the "Fixed Time Shuriken". It helps to kill different enemies and their souls can be taken. Also enables every enemy to blow down to size.
Flash
Items such as flashlights. The player can stock up on flashlights and use at any time at the enemy.
Diamond
Adds a certain amount to the player's score.

== Adaptations ==
- One of the video games, JaJaMaru no Daibouken, was based on the manga Famicom Rocky and Famicom Cap published by Coro Coro Comics, respectively.
- In Number 12 of Hisshō Tekunikku Kan Peki-ban (必勝テクニック完ペキ版) published by Wan Pakku Comics, JaJaMaru no Daibouken was basis as the manga by Ōno Katsuhiko.
