= Stepping Selection =

2000 video game

- Developer: Jaleco
- Publisher: Jaleco
- Platform: PlayStation 2
- Release: JP: March 4, 2000
- Genre: Music
- Modes: Single-player, multiplayer

Stepping Selection is a rhythm game for the PlayStation 2. It was released exclusively for Japanese markets on March 4, 2000. The game is based on Jaleco's Stepping Stage series of arcade games, featuring shortened versions of popular songs accompanied by videos loosely related to them.

== Song list ==
Most tracks in the game are covers of the original songs, but some are original recordings, which are indicated in bold.

Song title	Artist	Year
**"...Baby One More Time"**	**Britney Spears**	1998
**"5,6,7,8"**	**Steps**	1997
"Dschinghis Khan"	Dschinghis Khan	1979
"Eat You Up"	Angie Gold	1985
"Footloose"	Kenny Loggins	1984
"Galaxy Express 999"	Godiego	1979
"Ghostbusters"	Ray Parker Jr.	1984
"Girls Just Wanna Have Fun"	Cyndi Lauper	1983
"Hello Mr. Monkey"	Arabesque	1977
**"Larger than Life"**	**Backstreet Boys**	1999
**"Love's Got a Hold on My Heart"**	**Steps**	1999
"Maniac"	Michael Sembello	1983
"My Sharona"	The Knack	1979
"Night of Fire"	Niko	1997
"No Limit"	2 Unlimited	1993
"Santa Maria"	Tatjana	1995
"Saturday Night"	Bay City Rollers	1975
**"Scatman (Ski Ba Bop Ba Dop Bop)"**	**Scatman John**	1994
"Seventies"	Mega NRG Man	1996
"Sky High"	Jigsaw	1975
"Surfin' U.S.A."	The Beach Boys	1963
"Take Me Higher"	Dave Rodgers	1997
"The Neverending Story"	Limahl	1984
"Tora Tora Tora"	Domino	1994
"Try Me"	Lolita	1995
"You Can't Hurry Love"	The Supremes	1966

== Reception ==
On release, Famitsu magazine scored the PlayStation 2 version of the game a 32 out of 40.
