= Goblin Commander: Unleash the Horde =

2003 video game

- PAL region cover art for Xbox
- Developer: Jaleco Entertainment
- Publisher: Jaleco Entertainment
- Producer: Chris Millar
- Designer: Ronald Millar Sr.
- Programmer: Ken Klopp
- Writer: Christopher Zirpoli
- Composers: Chad Mossholder; Steve Pabst
- Platforms: PlayStation 2 Xbox; GameCube
- Release: PlayStation 2, Xbox: NA: November 11, 2003; PAL: March 19, 2004 (Xbox); PAL: March 11, 2005 (PS2); GameCube: NA: December 16, 2003; PAL: July 16, 2004
- Genres: Action, real-time strategy
- Modes: Single-player, multiplayer

Goblin Commander: Unleash the Horde is a 2003 action real-time strategy video game developed and published by Jaleco Entertainment for the Xbox, PlayStation 2 and GameCube consoles. It was released in North America for the Xbox and PS2 on November and on the GameCube in December 2003, and later in Europe on March and July 2004 and March 2005 for the Xbox, GameCube and PS2 respectively.

Set in a fantasy world, the story follows the tale of a civil war between goblin clans after their creator and master is killed. The gameplay is a combination of real-time strategy and light action where players gather resources and build up their horde of goblins while also being able to take direct control of certain units.

== Gameplay ==
Goblin Commander is a hybrid genre with much of the gameplay revolving around real-time strategy while incorporating elements of action gameplay. Players take control of a number from five different goblin clans, each with their own unique units and designs with the objective of harvesting resources to build up their horde and warring with the opposing player clans. Through a top-down perspective user interference, each player begins with one clan shrine for every goblin clan under their command and only one Hall of Titans, the former for recruiting and upgrading goblins and the latter for special "titan" units and turrets. The clan shrines are in a fixed location and if destroyed will have to be rebuilt. There are two kinds of resources to gather for purchases and upgrades: gold and souls. Gold is found throughout the map by locating treasure chests and destroying structures, both the terrain and foe's. Souls are harvested through either defeating enemy units or capturing souls wells. Additional structures are located elsewhere on the world map and must also be captured for use. These include the Observatory for a greater line of sight, revealing unexplored areas of the map and the Alchemist Shop for purchasing rune magic to be used for their own benefit or against other players.

There are five different goblin clans in total; Stonekrusher (grey), Hellfire (red), Stormbringer (blue), Plaguespitter (green) and Nighthorde (purple). Each clan focuses on either close combat or ranged orientated goblins, for example the Stonekrusher can recruit light, medium and heavy combat goblins but only just light range. They also have special goblins with their own ability such as the Hellfire scout for line of sight and the Stonekrusher drummer for healing other goblins there is also a unit on the Stormbringers side who give units more defense and a unit for Plaguespitters who decreases the defense of enemies. Additional units include a clan's unique titan that is large beast that have a variety of high damaging attacks but only one can be under player's control at a time. Turrets can be built across the map to automatically fire upon foes. Every time a goblin is recruited, it joins up with its clan's horde that is controlled as one unit, for example a player with three clans would have three hordes. Hordes can also be ordered follow other hordes and titans. The light action part of the gameplay involves players taking direct control of a horde or titan in a third person view and attack other enemies directly.

The game supports two modes, a single-player campaign where the player partakes in a series of missions with set objectives, slowly throughout gaining the command of the various goblin clans, and a two-player skirmish mode where two players can battle one another via split-screen choosing the map and clans in advance.

== Story ==
Set in the land of Ogriss, a human sorcerer named Fraziel set out to create what was only known as the "Great Machine". In order to build his device, he conjured up goblin servants, each faction forming their own clan under each moon. First was Grommel (the protagonist) of the Stonekrusher clan, under the white moon Froxx, to serve as miners in the deep caves. Second was Grax of the Hellfire clan, under the red moon Heelinx, to harvest wood in the forest. Third was Faine of the Stormbringer clan, under the blue moon Trist, to channel lightning in the mountains. Fourth was Syst of the Plaguespitter clan, under the green moon Phoust, to farm in the marshes. Fifthly (and finally) was Naxus of the Nighthorde clan, under the purple moon Farthis, to scavenge ancient battlegrounds.

Fraziel was making progress with the Great Machine until it was sabotaged, causing it to explode, caving in the mines and causing Grommel and the Stonekrusher clan to flee to the forests. Moments after, Grommel finds Fraziel as he crawls out of the wreckage, where, just before he dies, he gives one last cryptic word: "brother". Grommel then leads his clan out into Ogriss to attempt to know who or what killed his master, which was possibly one of his other four clan chieftain "brothers". In the forests, he first encounters Grax of the Hellfire clan, who, along with the other goblin clans, believe Grommel to be responsible and becomes hostile. Through a series of battles, Grax is defeated and the Hellfire clan rally around Grommel. This process continues with the Stormbringers and Plaguespitters with their respective leaders being killed while the survivors join Grommel.

Upon returning to the caves with all the other clans, Grommel confronts the last of his brothers: Naxus of the Nighthorde clan. It is revealed that the Great Machine was to produce bombs to steal the souls of all of Ogriss' creatures, allowing its controller to remake the world in his own image. Naxus sabotaged the machine to kill Fraziel and take it for himself to create a world of chaos and darkness. With the help of all the clans, including a traitorous part of the Nighthorde clan, Grommel battles his way through the caves in order to stop Naxus from sending the bombs from the now active machine through the Moongates, ancient teleportation devices. When Grommel finally corners Naxus, he leaves through one of the Moongates, leaving one active bomb among the hundreds of others. Grommel, however, narrowly throws the bomb through the same Moongate at Naxus, where it explodes, presumably killing him. After defeating Naxus, all the clans rally around Grommel with the intention on finding purpose now that the Great Machine is destroyed.

== Reception ==
Reception

Aggregate score
Aggregator	Score		
Aggregator	GameCube	PS2	Xbox
Metacritic	71/100	68/100	70/100

Review scores
Publication	Score		
Publication	GameCube	PS2	Xbox
Edge	N/A	5/10	N/A
Electronic Gaming Monthly	6.17/10	6.17/10	6.17/10
Game Informer	8/10	8/10	8/10
GamePro	N/A	N/A	4.5/5
GameSpot	6.7/10	6.7/10	6.7/10
GameSpy	N/A	3/5	3/5
GameZone	8.4/10	8.8/10	8.1/10
IGN	8/10	8/10	8/10
Nintendo Power	4.2/5	N/A	N/A
Official U.S. PlayStation Magazine	N/A	2.5/5	N/A
Official Xbox Magazine (US)	N/A	N/A	8/10

The game received "average" reviews on all platforms according to the review aggregation website Metacritic.
