= Spider Stompin' =

Redemption game

Spider Stompin' is a 1994 redemption arcade game by Jaleco. It is played on a platform where the player stomps on buttons as they are illuminated. It was followed by Spider Stompin' Deluxe and Spider Splattin'.

== Creation and manufacturing ==
Spider Stompin' was developed by Island Design, manufactured by Rino Manufacturing, and published by Jaleco. It was first sold on September 10, 1994. It is marketed toward younger children and is often used in children's arcades like Chuck E. Cheese.

The Spider Stompin' machine has a length of 57 inches, a width of 41 inches, and a height of 66 inches. The Spider Splattin' machine has a length of 37 inches, a width of 32 inches, and a height of 72 inches. Spider Stompin' weighs 230 pounds and Spider Splattin' weighs 250 pounds. It uses a Deltronics Labs DL-I 275 Ticket Dispenser, and operators can set the device to output tickets depending on the percentage of successful presses or to dispense a fixed amount of tickets. A sequel to Spider Stompin', Spider Stompin' Deluxe, was released with alternate design and graphics.

== Gameplay ==
Spider Stompin' is a redemption game that dispenses tickets depending on the final score. The gameplay is a variant of reflex-based arcade games like Whac-A-Mole. It is played on an octagon-shaped platform with several plastic buttons, where each button is incorporated into the design of a spider and the platform is decorated with a spider-web pattern. The buttons light up one at a time, and the player must step on each lit button before it dims. A board in front of the platform tracks the player's score. The score is displayed both numerically and visually. The player's score is not affected by the amount of force used to press the button.

Spider Stompin' has three difficulty levels. These adjust the number of spiders in play and the amount of time players have to press each button. It is intended to be a single-player game but can be exploited by having multiple players cooperate.

Jaleco released a variant of Spider Stompin' called Spider Splattin', where the buttons are on a control panel instead of a platform and players use a mallet or their hands to press buttons as they activate.

== Reception ==
Monthly polling by Play Meter magazine saw arcade operators rating Spider Stompin' their favorite bopping/stomping redemption game multiple times between 1996 and 1998.
