= World Championship Pool 2004 =

2003 video game

- PAL region PS2 cover art
- Developer: Blade Interactive
- Publisher: Jaleco
- Platforms: PlayStation 2, Xbox, Windows, GameCube
- Release: NA: December 8, 2003 (Xbox); NA: April 27, 2004 (PS2); NA: April 30, 2004 (PC); PAL: March 4, 2005; NA: March 15, 2005 (GCN)
- Genre: Sports simulation (pool)
- Modes: Single-player, multiplayer

World Championship Pool 2004 (also known as 2004 World Championship Pool or simply World Championship Pool) is a sports simulation video game developed in 2003 by Blade Interactive and released by Jaleco for PlayStation 2, Xbox, Windows, and GameCube. The game features several variants of pool (pocket billiards), and simulated pro players.

== Characters ==
Twenty-four simulations of real-life, world-class professional pool players appear, and are playable characters in the game:

1. Thorsten Hohmann, 2 Championships
2. Efren Reyes, 2 Championships
3. Earl Strickland, 3 Championships
4. Ralf Souquet, 2 Championships
5. Francisco Bustamante, 1 Championship
6. Johnny Archer, 2 Championships
7. Tony Drago, Snooker Legend
8. Steve Davis, Snooker Legend
9. Mika Immonen, 1 Championship
10. Marcus Chamat
11. Nick van den Berg, 1 Final
12. Chris Melling, 2 Championships
13. Mick Hill, 6 Championship
14. Darren Appleton, 2 Championships
15. Carl Morris, 1 Championship
16. Keith Brewer, 1 Final
17. Gareth Potts, 3 Championships
18. Keith Jones
19. Ian Hubbard
20. Phil Harrison, 1 Championship
21. Lee Kendall, 2 Finals
22. Stephen Munro
23. Gareth Manning
24. Yannick Beaufils, 1 Final
