= Sterling Sharpe: End 2 End =

1995 video game

- Cover art
- Developer: TOSE
- Publisher: Jaleco
- Platform: Super NES
- Release: NA: March 1995
- Genre: Traditional football simulation
- Modes: Single-player, multiplayer

Sterling Sharpe: End 2 End is a Super Nintendo Entertainment System football video game released in 1995 exclusively for the North American market.

== Summary ==
After the player with the ball is tackled, the play ends and both teams figure out new plays.

This video game was endorsed by retired NFL wide receiver Sterling Sharpe (his career with the Green Bay Packers ended in 1994 due to a neck injury). The game was rated Kids to Adults by the Entertainment Software Rating Board advisory panel.

The object is to win football games by following and complying with the standard rules of the National Football League. Referees deliver penalties to players (human or CPU) who commit penalties; these always carry either a five-yard penalty or a ten-yard penalty depending on the severity of the offense.

While the 30 cities involved in the 1994 NFL season were used, their team name and official logos were dropped. None of the actual NFL players themselves appear in the game like Emmitt Smith, Troy Aikman, or Brett Favre. Sterling Sharpe sometimes compliments the player when he makes an excellent play on the field.

== Reception ==
GamePro referred to the game as a mediocre Madden NFL clone. They particularly criticized it for lacking a regular season mode, real teams, and real players, and added that due to the poor controls "Completions are based more on luck than skill." They singled out the large variety of plays as the game's one strong point.

Next Generation reviewed the SNES version of the game, rating it one star out of five, and stated that "While this cart includes expansion clubs like Jacksonville and Charlotte for a total of 30 teams, there's no option for season play whatsoever. What kind of fun is that?"
