= Cybattler =

1993 video game

- Developer: Jaleco
- Publisher: Jaleco
- Platform: Arcade
- Release: JP: February 1993
- Genre: Multidirectional shooter
- Modes: Single-player, multiplayer

Cybattler (Note: Japanese: サイバトラー, Hepburn: Saibatorā) is a 1993 multidirectional shooter video game developed and published by Jaleco for arcades. It was only released in Japan in February 1993. Cybattler is one of the first games available outside Japan for the first time on Antstream Arcade on July 1, 2019. Hamster Corporation released the game as part of their Arcade Archives series for the Nintendo Switch and PlayStation 4 in February 2021. On July 28, 2022, the game is also included on the Jaleco Arcade 1 cartridge for the Evercade platform.

== Gameplay ==
The player controls a mecha named Blanche who defeats enemies with guns, beam swords and miscellaneous items that vary with each stage. The goal is to defeat enemies and reach the end of the stage; unlike other shoot 'em ups starring mechs at the time, the mecha is not restricted to one fixed angle, allowing it to shoot in eight different directions while strafing with the attack button held. Some power-ups, including attack up items and a powerful yet fragile cannon, can be obtained in some stages.
