= Racket Attack =

1988 video game

- North American cover art
- Developer: Tose
- Publisher: Jaleco
- Platform: NES
- Release: 1988
- Genre: Sports
- Modes: Single-player, multiplayer

Racket Attack is a 1988 professional tennis Nintendo Entertainment System game. It was released in Japan as Moero!! Pro Tennis (燃えろ!!プロテニス), which is the second game of the Moero!! sports series. The gameplay takes place in a ¼ overhead view tennis court with the score being present at all times and an audience of spectators being shown in multiple colors (white, pink, and red). The North American version features an endorsement from Wilson Sporting Goods. The game was released fairly late in the NES life cycle in Europe and the PAL regions, as available sources show, due to the lengthy process of distributing and the fact that Nintendo have still just started to get into the region by the time of the Japanese release of the game.

This game is seen as an overall improvement over the original Tennis video game for the Nintendo Entertainment System with a wide selection of player characters and a deep level of gameplay for the late 1980s.

== Gameplay ==
Two female opponents facing off against each other. The Wilson advertisement is presented only in the North American version.

Racket Attack includes two gameplay modes: one-player (representing a tennis tournament) and two-player (which represents an exhibition match). After winning seven matches in single-player mode, of increasing difficulty, the player receives a championship trophy. Players can choose between playing on grass, clay, or hard court, and between a women's match (best-of-3) or men's match (best-of-5).

There are 16 different players; eight male, and eight female, each with their own strengths and weaknesses. The male players can only play against other male players, while females can only play against other females.

Passwords allow players to retain their statistics after playing; they also allow access to any level between the second round of the tournament and the end game. There are six possible tennis moves, including lob, volley, and slice. While serving, the camera angle moves slightly more over the player's shoulder. Both buttons of the NES controller are used to hit the ball; the "A" button is used mainly for front-court action while the "B" button is primarily reserved for back court moves. Players can protest to the line judge if a decision is not made in their favor.

== Reception ==
Allgame gave Racket Attack a score of 4 stars out of a possible 5. Power Play gave the game a score of 42 out 100 while Video Games also gave it a score of 42 out of 100.
