= Super Bubble Pop =

2002 video game

- North American GameCube cover art
- Developers: Zombie Inc. Runecraft
- Publishers: Jaleco eGames (Windows)
- Composer: Jeremy Taylor
- Platforms: GameCube, Xbox, Game Boy Advance, PlayStation, Windows
- Release: January 1, 2002: Windows; NA: January 1, 2002; Xbox; NA: December 25, 2002; PAL: March 15, 2003 PlayStation; NA: December 25, 2002 Game Boy Advance; NA: December 20, 2002 GameCube; NA: January 3, 2003
- Genre: Puzzle
- Modes: Single-player, multiplayer

Super Bubble Pop is a puzzle video game released in 2002 by Runecraft.

== Gameplay ==
The player is able to choose from 5 DJ poppers, including 2 unlockable ones, along with 4 grooving soundtracks. They are faced with rows of advancing bubbles of different colors. They can launch bubbles of their own. The idea is to create a row, column or stack of 3 or more bubbles. When that happens, they will pop. Each character has their own favorite bubble color and when they pop them, color energy is transferred to their special jar. Once the jar is full, the player can unleash their super special attack. During the puzzles, the player is also provided with nine different special attacks that they can obtain by getting special bubbles. The current special attack the player has is displayed on a wheel called the Torus.

The game consists of three different 1 player difficulty modes along with a training mode, each having 50 levels of bubble popping puzzles and a 2 player mode that allows a player to compete for the higher score against a friend. Each level is allowed to be won by popping all of the bubbles or by collecting a certain amount of Level Stars.
