= Speed Racer (1996 video game) =

- North American cover art
- Developer: Graphic Research
- Publishers: JP: Tomy; NA: Jaleco
- Platform: PlayStation
- Release: JP: September 27, 1996; NA: March 27, 1998
- Genre: Racing
- Mode: Single-player

Speed Racer, known in Japan as Mach Go Go Go (マッハGoGoGo, Mahha Gō Gō Gō), is a PlayStation game based on the television show of the same name. It was released by the company Jaleco (Tomy in Japan) in 1996, though it did not appear in North America until March 27, 1998. It met with overwhelmingly negative reviews which cited simplistic and outdated gameplay and graphics.

== Gameplay ==
Speed Racer is an arcade type game that resembles Daytona USA. The major difference between the two games is the performance of the car and the fact that the player can use all the gadgets of the anime Mach 5. The gadgets can be used to "shunt" other cars (even with the Cutter, the cars only bounce and there is no damage), or take shortcuts by cutting down trees and driving underwater through lakes. The player switches over the gadgets and the camera views. The player can choose the length of the race in the menu, along with basic sound options and difficulty options.

In the options menu the player can watch a video that explains all the functionalities of the gadgets on the Mach 5.

== Sound ==
The opening movie is the same as the anime, carrying the Japanese version's song. The North American version of the opening movie is the same as the English dub's opening. The game has music which can be listened to in the options menu.

== Reception ==
Reception

Review scores
| Publication | Score |
|---|---|
| AllGame | 3/5 |
| Electronic Gaming Monthly | 5/10 (Note: Four critics of Electronic Gaming Monthly gave the game each a score of 7/10, 3.5/10, 5/10, and 4.5/10.) |
| Famitsu | 25/40 |
| Game Informer | 6.75/10 |
| GameFan | 82% (Note: In GameFan's viewpoint of the game, three critics gave it each a score of 82, 84, and 81.) |
| GameSpot | 4.2/10 |
| IGN | 5/10 |
| Next Generation | 2/5 |
| Official U.S. PlayStation Magazine | 2/5 |
| PlayStation: The Official Magazine | 2/5 |

Speed Racer met with overwhelmingly negative reviews. A number of critics described it as nothing more than a rebranded clone of the aging game Ridge Racer. Even those who did not make this specific comparison agreed that Speed Racer did nothing to distinguish itself from past racing games; GamePro called it "an average fast-paced racing game that doesn't break any new barriers", (Note: GamePro gave the game two 3/5 scores for graphics and fun factor, 2/5 for sound, and 4/5 for control.) and IGN said it is a straightforward racer which fails to exploit the defining characteristics of the Speed Racer license. Most critics said that the game's one distinguishing feature, the Mach V gizmos, are underutilized to the point of irrelevance, being useful only for breaking into certain shortcuts.

A number of reviews also criticized that the game is too short, with just one track subdivided into two smaller tracks, and that the voice clips during the races are annoying and incessant. The lack of a multiplayer mode was also criticized, and some found both the gameplay features and graphics were severely outdated by the time the game was released in North America. Next Generation stated that "With all of the racing games coming down the pipeline this year, old technology and stale gameplay just don't make the cut." Kelly Rickards of Electronic Gaming Monthly was one of the few to defend the game, saying that while the description of it as a rebranded Ridge Racer is not completely untrue, the ways in which the player must access shortcuts and hidden areas help it stand out. He gave it a 7 out of 10, while his three co-reviewers all gave it a 5 out of 10 or lower, razing its simplicity and lack of longevity. GameSpot's Joe Fielder ventured that "you could pick just about any other racer off the shelf and have more fun."
