= Brawl Brothers =

1992 video game

- North American cover art
- Developer: Jaleco
- Publisher: Jaleco
- Designers: Hoshi Kazuaki; Ryoichi Kuramochi
- Composers: Atsuyoshi Isemura; Hajime Uchida
- Series: Rushing Beat
- Platform: Super Nintendo Entertainment System
- Release: JP: December 22, 1992; NA: March 11, 1993; PAL: 1993
- Genre: Beat 'em up
- Modes: Single-player, multiplayer

Brawl Brothers, known in Japan as Rushing Beat Run (ラッシング・ビート乱 複製都市, Rasshingu Biito Ran: Fukusei Toshi; "Rushing Beat Chaos: The City of Clones"), (Note: Although the kanji 乱 is pronounced ran, the background for the character select and stage map screens displays the romanized title as "RUSHING BEAT RUN", suggesting that this is the developer's preferred transliteration.) is a 1992 beat 'em up video game developed and published by Jaleco for the Super Nintendo Entertainment System. It is the second game in the Rushing Beat series, after Rival Turf!, and was followed by The Peace Keepers in 1993.

== Gameplay ==
As in Final Fight, the player has to walk sideways and fight bad guys for several stages. Next to the general food-health supplies, the player can also pick up weapons like sticks, guns, grenades and such. A special "Angry Mode" gives injured fighters a burst of energy.

It is the only known SNES game that features its Japanese version on the same cartridge, accessible through use of a cheat code. The Japanese version of the game features different character names, no maze-like stages, an expanded ending sequence and the addition of a groin kick move for playable character Douglas Bild.

== Characters ==
The player can choose from one of five characters, with American and Japanese version names:

- Hack / Rick Norton, the street brawler. Compared to Rival Turf!, Norton is more imposing and one of his throws is a deadly German suplex. He now wears bandages around his pants' lower legs to protect his shins. His boss stage is a platform surrounded by a steel cage.
- Slash / Douglas Bild, the police officer, who has gained more size as well and wears yellow boots that also go up to half his calf. He can no longer do a Frankensteiner, but his power bomb is much stronger. His alternate throw is an Atomic Drop from the back. In the Japanese version it is an Atomic Drop from the front, which is a direct shot to the groin, which was censored by Nintendo of America. His boss stage is a construction platform that is raised and lowered as the battle goes on.

The new characters aiding them are these:

- Lord J, the judo master, slow and lumbering but with powerful throws. His boss stage is a temple court;
- Kazan, the ninja, very quick and able to split himself in half to slash foes. His boss stage is a ninja dojo training room and has spikes on the floors which become walls as the room rotates;
- Wendy Milan, the professional wrestler, rather quick for the powerful moves she can execute. Her boss stage is a conventional wrestling ring whose ropes she can jump on to execute flying attacks.

In a one-player game, a "partner" will chosen for the player at random by the CPU. The remaining characters thereafter (or clones of them per the Japanese storyline) will be chosen as bosses for the first three levels. The remaining level ends with a battle against the final boss, Dieter/Iceman, a martial artist with an extendable and flexible staff.

== Reception ==
Reception

Review scores
Publication	Score
AllGame	3/5
Computer and Video Games	80/100
Famitsu	7/10, 6/10, 6/10, 5/10
GameFan	89%, 80%, 80%, 85%
Official Nintendo Magazine	84/100
Super Play	60%
Total!	53%
Control	64%
Hippon Super!	6/10
N-Force	69/100
Nintendo Game Zone	72/100
SNES Force	74%
Super Action	86%
The Super Famicom	68/100
Super Pro	62/100

Brawl Brothers received a 20.79/30 score in a 1993 readers' poll conducted by Super Famicom Magazine, ranking among Super Famicom titles at the number 145 spot. The game received mixed reviews from critics. Paul Davies and Edward Lawrence of Nintendo Magazine System called it an "outstanding beat' em up which suffers on a few minor accounts". AllGame's Brett Alan Weiss praised the game's the graphics, music, and addition of more enemies and moves than Rival Turf!, but the lack of speed, precision, and polish compared to games like Streets of Rage and Double Dragon were criticized.
