= Battle Unit Zeoth =

1990 video game

- Japanese cover art of Battle Unit Zeoth
- Developer: Jaleco Entertainment
- Publisher: Jaleco Entertainment
- Programmers: Yasuo Igakura; Manabu Shirato
- Artists: Aizawa Buglin; Shin Matsuda
- Composer: Akihito Hayashi
- Platform: Game Boy
- Release: JP: December 21, 1990; EU: 1991; NA: July 1991
- Genre: Scrolling shooter
- Mode: Single-player

Battle Unit Zeoth (バトルユニットゼオス) is a scrolling shooter video game developed by Jaleco for the Nintendo Game Boy in 1990 which saw a release in North America and Europe one year later in 1991.

== Story ==
Battle Unit Zeoth takes place in the future where mankind is invaded by a race of alien robots known as the Grein. Forty-two years ago, the humans of Earth united to drive out the first invasion of the Grein aliens in a fierce and costly war, but as the Grein retreated, they left behind a secret underground base filled with self-replicating Grein machines.

Ten years after the Earth's victory, the secret Grein base opened and a new attack force decimated the city of New Age. To retaliate, Earth's military has deployed a mecha known as Battle Unit Zeoth, specializing in alien combat. It is the Zeoth's assignment to stop the attack force, go into the Grein secret base, and destroy the mechanical occupants before a new invasion force arrives.

== Gameplay ==
Players control the Zeoth mecha using jet-powered thrusters to propel the battle unit through the air, and can fire weapons in four directions (left, right, up and down) to destroy Grein enemies. The game includes five stages which include New Age City, the underground base, and the Grein's mechanical command headquarters. The odd-numbered stages are horizontal scrolling stages while the even-numbered stages are short, vertically aligned platform stages. Each stage ends with a boss fight. Players receive points by destroying enemies and clearing stages which contribute to their score, but the high score is not saved and is lost when the Game Boy is turned off.

The Zeoth mecha is equipped by default with a standard Vulcan cannon weapon, and a limited hyper shield, depicted with a meter at the bottom of the screen. The Zeoth can also trigger a hyper bomb to eliminate all Grein enemies on the screen at the cost of two hyper shield meter units. The Zeoth is destroyed if the hyper shield meter is depleted, but the player is offered limitless continues and a chance to start the stage over with a default Zeoth mecha.

Players can shoot and collect special item containers found in each stage to restore the hyper shield meter, equip a different weapon, or enhance the equipped weapon. Containers marked with a "U" upgrades the hyper shield by replenishing some of its meter. Containers marked with "B" or "L" equips a beam weapon or laser weapon, respectively. Containers marked with a "P" power-ups the equipped weapon, increasing the pattern and strength of shots fired.

Each weapon can be enhanced by power-up containers from level one to a maximum of three. Collecting excess "P" powerup containers restores the hyper shield meter. The beam weapon is upgraded to fire a wide wave of strong beam shots, while the laser weapon is upgraded to fire a large criss-crossing pattern capable of striking more nimble enemies.

== History ==
This game was released in Japan under the name "Battle Unit Zeoth". When Jaleco began planning for the US/Europe release they renamed it "Jetpack". This name was later changed back to "Battle Unit Zeoth". It is thought that Jaleco changed the name because they did not think American audiences would buy the game as it sounded too foreign.

== Release and reception ==
Reception

Review scores
Publication	Score
Famitsu	4/10, 6/10, 6/10, 3/10
Génération 4	6/10

Battle Unit Zeroth was released for the Game Boy in Japan on December 21, 1990.

The French magazine Génération 4 found it to be a basic shoot 'em up that was generally too difficult. A reviewer in GamePro similarly said it was not an great game, being short and challenging. Maurice Molyneaux of VideoGames & Computer Entertainment said it was a "fairly mediocre Game boy title" noting its simple objectives, graphics and sound and finding the controls awkward and annoying to use.
