= D-Day (1984 video game) =

1984 video game

- Arcade flyer
- Developer: E.L.S.
- Publisher: Jaleco
- Platforms: Arcade, MSX
- Release: JP: January 1984
- Genre: Multidirectional shooter
- Modes: Single-player, multiplayer

D-Day (Note: Japanese: ディー・デー, Hepburn: Dī Dē) is a 1984 multidirectional shooter video game developed by E.L.S. and published by Jaleco for arcades. It was released in Japan in January 1984. A MSX port was released in Japan by Toshiba EMI and Europe by System 4. A Family Computer version was planned by Jaleco but was never finished or released.

Hamster Corporation released the original game outside Japan for the first time as part of their Arcade Archives series for the Nintendo Switch and PlayStation 4 in August 2025. It is the series' last collaboration with Jaleco catalogue owner City Connection, who had cut ties with the company years earlier.

== Gameplay ==
The player controls a battleship who approaches Normandy, occupied France, during the Normandy landings. The battleship can shoot airborne enemies on all directions and ground enemies only in front of it. The battleship must be moved ahead of any enemy attack, as it moves relatively slowly and hence cannot quickly avoid obstacles. The battleship can sink enemy ships by slamming into them, but it suffers great damage in the process and cannot take another direct hit.

== Reception ==
Beginner's Radio reviewed the MSX version, noting that the distinct aiming of both weapons as well as the ship's sluggish movement made the gameplay difficult to synchronize, though they praised the visuals.
