= Pulse Racer =

2002 video game

- Cover art
- Developer: Jaleco Entertainment
- Publisher: Jaleco Entertainment
- Producer: Quincy Roach
- Designer: David "Oz" Osborne
- Composer: Mikael Sandgren (Note: Additional music by David Goodale, Chad Mossholder, Steve Pabst, Mike Smith, and Heather Sowards.)
- Platform: Xbox
- Release: NA: December 10, 2002
- Genre: Racing
- Modes: Single-player, multiplayer

Pulse Racer is a video game developed and published by Jaleco Entertainment in North America for the Xbox in 2002. The game is a futuristic racing game featuring the addition of a speed boost system in which players "use their own life force" to gain acceleration in races. Pulse Racer also featured a novel track creation system, INFINITRAX, in which players could generate random tracks by setting a number of custom parameters. The game was released to a poor critical reception, with reviewers faulting the game's unoriginality and lackluster execution of its novel gameplay additions, including the speed boost system. The game remains one of the lowest-rated titles for the Xbox.

== Gameplay ==
A screenshot of gameplay in Pulse Racer.

Pulse Racer is a conventional cart racing video game in which players compete in races across a series of tracks. The gameplay features a novel concept of "heart rate", in which players are able to "speed boost" using the joystick, but must maintain their heart rate below a threshold to prevent the driver having a heart attack, where the driver will enter cardiac arrest and lose the race. Races also feature several power-ups, including "plasma orbs" that allow players to turn corners at no loss of speed, and collectables including offensive weapons including missiles and mines, shields, speed boosts and health power-ups.

The game features several modes of play. In 'Career Race', players can complete a series of three leagues of races in increasing difficulties, with completed races leading to unlockable characters and options for the track creator. 'Quick Race' allows for custom races for one to four players. 'Time Trial' is a single-player mode in which the player races against the clock. The game features five tracks, with an additional track creator titled INFINITRAX, which allows players to generate tracks based on a series of parameters unlocked through the 'Career Race' mode, including setting the "location of the track, how curvy, wide, and far it is, as well as how many hills and dips there are."

== Development ==
Pulse Racer producer Quincy Roach stated that the game was influenced by "a number of cart titles on the market", with the game's primary inspiration being the 1988 arcade game Power Drift. Roach stated that the game was released for the Xbox to avoid graphical limitations and support a four-player split screen mode, and used anti-aliasing and per-pixel lighting to smooth the design of the graphics.

== Critical reception ==
Reception

Aggregate score
Aggregator	Score
Metacritic	24/100

Review scores
Publication	Score
Game Informer	3/10
GameSpot	3.3/10
IGN	1.9/10
Official Xbox Magazine (US)	1/10
X-Play	2/5
Gaming Target	1.8/10
Xbox Addict	40%
Xbox Nation (XBN)	2/10

Pulse Racer received negative reception from critics, with the review aggregation website Metacritic noting the game received "generally unfavorable reviews", receiving an average score of 24% across 7 reviews. The game remains the third lowest-scored title on Metacritic for the Xbox. Many critics condemned the game, including Hilary Goldstein of IGN, who faulted the game's basic design, stating the game "never hits on the essential needs of a cart racer" and was "almost unplayable", and Ryan Davis of GameSpot, who described the game as a "derivative" and "cheap-looking, unenjoyable game", finding "there's really nothing that Pulse Racer does that hasn't been done before and much better."

Several reviewers critiqued the poor execution of the game's novel features as a hindrance to the game, including the turbo system. Goldstein dismissed the turbo system as a "stupid idea", stating it "goes against what a racer should be - driving fast and being fun." Similarly, Brad Kane of X-Play stated the system was "not an intuitive process" and noted the "speed of the vehicles is far too slow...you'll spend way too much time at the painfully dawdling default velocity." Davis critiqued the game's plasma orbs, stating "none of the turns are so outrageously hard that you ever really need to use (them)...the plasma orbs will often fail to activate for no apparent reason." Ryan Genno of Gaming Target found the controls difficult, stating "it's very awkward to move when you have to use the analog stick to (use) turbo or extra acceleration options."

Critics were also disappointed by the design and presentation of the game's tracks and track editor. Kane noted that whilst the track generation system was "interesting", the tracks featured a "lack in real creativity" and resulted in a "bland set of courses that reuse many common visual elements." Genno found frustration in the requirement to use points to operate the track editor, and found the "minor adjustment options" of the editor underwhelming. Davis found the editor's usefulness "limited by the generally dull designs it produces and by the fact that you have to play through all of the career mode and then some to accumulate enough points to unlock the different variable controls."
