= Vanark =

1999 video game

- Developer: Bit Town
- Publishers: Asmik Ace, Jaleco
- Platform: PlayStation
- Release: JP: October 7, 1999; NA: April 10, 2000
- Genre: Rail shooter
- Mode: Single-player

Vanark, known in Japan as Astro Trooper Vanark (宇宙機動ヴァンアーク, Uchūkido Vanāku), is a rail shooter developed by Bit Town and published by Asmik Ace and Jaleco in 1999–2000.

== Reception ==
Reception

Aggregate score
Aggregator	Score
GameRankings	65%

Review scores
Publication	Score
Electronic Gaming Monthly	6.25/10 (Note: Four critics of Electronic Gaming Monthly gave the game each a score of 6.5/10, 5.5/10, 6/10, and 7/10.)
Famitsu	24/40
Game Informer	7/10
GameFan	72%
GameSpot	6.9/10
IGN	8/10
Official U.S. PlayStation Magazine	3/5
PlayStation: The Official Magazine	2/5

The game received mixed reviews according to the review aggregation website GameRankings. In Japan, Famitsu gave it a score of 24 out of 40. GamePro said of the game, "though not exceptional, Vanark's clever combination of disparate elements is worth experiencing—mainly as a rental." (Note: GamePro gave it 4/5 for graphics, sound, control, and fun factor.)
