= Idol Janshi Suchie-Pai =

Video game series

- Cover of Bishōjo Janshi Suchie-Pai, the first game in the series
- Developer: Jaleco
- Publisher: Jaleco

Idol Janshi Suchie-Pai (アイドル雀士スーチーパイ, Aidoru Janshi Sūchī-Pai; lit. 'Idol Mahjong Player Suchie-Pai') is a series of mahjong video games that have been developed and released by Jaleco on a variety of platforms including arcade, PC, and video game consoles. The first game in the series was on the Super Famicom in 1993 as Bishōjo Janshi Suchie-Pai and was renamed Idol Janshi Suchie-Pai for its subsequent releases. Kenichi Sonoda did the character designs. There is also an anime OVA that is based on the game.

== Games ==
Title	Year	Platforms
Bishōjo Janshi Suchie-Pai	1993	Super Famicom, Virtual Console
Idol Janshi Suchie-Pai Special	1993	Arcade, Sega Saturn
Idol Janshi Suchie-Pai II	1994	Arcade, 3DO, Sega Saturn, Windows
Idol Janshi Suchie-Pai Limited	1995	PlayStation
Idol Janshi Suchie-Pai Remix	1995	Sega Saturn
Idol Janshi Suchie-Pai II Limited	1996	PlayStation
Idol Janshi Suchie-Pai Mecha Genteiban	1998	Sega Saturn
Suchie-Pai Adventure: Doki Doki Nightmare	1998	PlayStation, Sega Saturn
Idol Janshi o Tsukucchaou	1999	Dreamcast
Idol Janshi Suchie-Pai Secret Album	1999	Sega Saturn
Idol Janshi Suchie-Pai III	1999	Arcade, Windows
Idol Janshi R: Janguru Project	2002	PlayStation 2
Idol Janshi Suchie-Pai III Remix	2007	Nintendo DS, PlayStation Portable
Idol Janshi Suchie-Pai IV	2007	PlayStation 2
Idol Janshi Suchie-Pai IV Portable	2010	PlayStation Portable
Idol Janshi Suchie-Pai Saturn Tribute	2022	Nintendo Switch
