= Argus (video game) =

1986 video game

- Arcade flyer
- Developer: NMK
- Publisher: Jaleco
- Composer: Shinichi Sakamoto
- Platforms: Arcade, Famicom
- Release: Arcade: JP: January 1986; Famicom: JP: April 17, 1986
- Genre: Scrolling shooter
- Modes: Single-player, multiplayer

Argus (Note: Japanese: アーガス, Hepburn: Āgasu) is a 1986 vertically scrolling shooter video game developed by NMK and published by Jaleco for arcades. A port to the Famicom was released the same year. An emulated version of the original arcade game is included as part of their Arcade Archives series by Hamster Corporation for the Nintendo Switch and PlayStation 4 on August 30, 2018, as the game's first release outside Japan.

== Gameplay ==
In Argus, up to two players take control of a fighter jet Wol-Arg, whose goal is to shoot airborne enemies and on ground-based enemies, collect power-ups scattered throughout the levels, and defeat every boss to advance to the next level. The controls consist of two buttons; one to shoot missiles and the other to shoot a laser at enemies and power-ups on the ground.

== Reception ==
In Japan, Game Machine listed Argus as the 13th most successful table arcade unit of February 1986.

== Legacy ==
Argus is one of the video games that was adapted into a manga titled Susume!! Seigaku Dennou Kenkyuubu (進め！！静学電脳研究部, Shiawase no katachi), published in the Gamest Comics collection in April 1999, illustrated by Kouta Hirano.
