= Tuff E Nuff =

1993 video game

- North American cover art
- Developer: Jaleco
- Publisher: Jaleco
- Director: Yuki Arai
- Programmers: Byontar Nottengham; Kenichi Kase
- Artists: Mr. Kamikaze; Mr. Hasegawa; Nobuyuki Kuramochi
- Writer: Kouji Aoki
- Composers: Yasuhiko Takashiba; Suguru Ishida
- Platform: Super NES
- Release: JP: March 26, 1993; NA: September 1993; EU: October 1993
- Genre: Fighting game
- Modes: Single-player; Multiplayer

Tuff E Nuff, known in Japan as Dead Dance (デッドダンス, Deddo Dansu), is a 1993 fighting game developed and published by Jaleco for the Super Nintendo Entertainment System (SNES).

== Gameplay ==
A screenshot of Kotono vs. Dolf

The game can be played with one to two players. The game starts off with only four characters, but a Boss Code can unlock the other seven characters. The game has three modes: Story Mode, 1-Player to CPU Mode (fighting against each boss individually, except the last one), and Multiplayer Mode. The fighting system is based on buttons: two for kicks and two for punches (light and fierce, respectively). All characters have at least two special attacks. In all modes, the more life anyone loses, the more bloody the characters' faces become, much like in SNK's Art of Fighting series; however, like the final epilogues of the main characters, were removed from the North American and European versions.

There are ten stages in story mode, where either Kotono, Syoh, Vortz and Zazi fight. After picking a character, the player must fight the other three in a tournament-style fashion. After fighting the other heroes, the player must fight the six guards leading to Jade (Jado in the Japanese version). After fighting Jade, there is an ending sequence (only in the Japanese version) followed by a screen saying to go to hard mode, or a congratulations for the completion of beating hard mode. After beating hard mode, the closing credits show a clip of the players' battles with the enemies faced. The four main characters' skills evolve over story mode, featuring an RPG-like element, meaning their special moves become slightly larger and more powerful after each group of opponents are defeated.

== Plot ==
The story is set in a post-apocalyptic Earth in the year AD 2151 (or 200X in the Japanese version). in the aftermath of World War 3 To the inhabitants on Earth it seems like the only chance for a decent life is to fight, in a "survival of the fittest" scenario. A man named Jade finds a powerful blue fighting armor and calls himself "The Fighting King". With it, he quickly gains control of the world. Using his newfound power, he erects a tower with six guards. Many try to take Jade's power away, but they die in their attempt. Some weeks after the building of the tower, a tournament is held all over the world to see who is the strongest. Of the many fighters, only four people are chosen. Now they need to fight each other to see who is going in the tower. The plot dialogues of the Story mode and the final epilogues were excluded from the North American and European versions.

== Characters ==
Playable characters:

- Syoh (翔, Shō) - A 22-year-old street brawler from Hokkaidō, Japan, his fighting style is called Tenga Haouryuu (Heavenly Claw). His motive was to finish the fight with Zazi, which was interrupted when the Great War started.
- Zazi (ザジ, Zaji) - A 22-year-old rival of Syoh from the United States, his fighting style is Chisou Haouryuu (Earth Claw). He is a head swap of Syoh.
- Kotono (琴乃) - A 19-year-old female ninja from Kyoto, Japan, her fighting style is Kuki Shindenryu Ninjutsu. A master of sword fighting, she uses kunai throwing knives and kick attacks. Her motive is revenge on Jado, who killed her father.
- Vortz (ヴォルツ, Vorutsu) - A 31-year-old professional wrestler from the Netherlands, nicknamed "Shishio" (King of Beasts). His fighting style features several slamming moves. He is searching for someone nobody knows.

CPU opponents:

- (United States) Beans (ビーンズ, Bīnzu) - A 25-year-old punk and street fighting champion from Bronx, New York.
- (Libya) Dolf (ドルフ, Dorufu) - A 34-year-old former Libyan military commander, now an assassin and mercenary who fights with a large knife and a rocket launcher.
- Rei Mizuno (水野 麗, Mizuno Rei) - A 19-year-old kenpō expert and magician from Japan. She has the ability to summon spirits which aid her in combat.
- (Netherlands) Gajet (ガジェット, Gajetto) - A 28-year-old pro wrestler. Gajet once accidentally killed an opponent and was barred from the sport, only to discover that he liked killing. It is assumed he and Vortz were once friends, but in the Japanese ending for Vortz (this and the endings for the other characters were removed from the international releases for unknown reasons), it is revealed that the two are in fact brothers.
- Shirou (紫狼, Shirō) - An extremely fast and agile ninja from Japan. His fighting style is Iga Ninjutsu and he uses a sword and magic attacks.
- K's (キース, Kīzu) - A 29-year-old cyborg from Germany. His weapon of choice is his bionic arms, which gives him good range on attacks.
- (N/A) Jade (ジャドー, Jadō) - The self-proclaimed Fighting King and the game's final boss.

== Release ==
The original Japanese cover art to Dead Dance/Tuff E Nuff is taken from an issue cover of the UK gaming magazine Computer and Video Games. CVG created the artwork for their preview feature as there was none available at the time. Jaleco were so impressed with the design, they asked CVG to make it the official artwork for the game. It appears on the Japanese and European versions of the game. Jaleco USA decided to use their own box art instead for the American release which can be seen in the first level of the original arcade version of Jaleco's Game Tengoku.

Tuff E Nuff was added to the Nintendo Classics service in December 2020.

== Reception ==
Reception

Review scores
Publication	Score
Computer and Video Games	90/100
Electronic Gaming Monthly	8/10, 7/10, 8/10, 7/10
Famitsu	8/10, 6/10, 6/10, 7/10
GameFan	91%, 86%, 89%, 92%
GamesMaster	79%
Official Nintendo Magazine	89/100
Super Play	78%
Total!	(UK) 67% (DE) 3-
VideoGames & Computer Entertainment	8/10
Hippon Super!	4/10
Marukatsu Super Famicom	8/10, 7/10, 9/10, 8/10
SNES Force	65/100
Super Action	85%
Super Control	89%
The Super Famicom	74/100
Super Pro	81/100

Tuff E Nuff received a 19.61/30 score in a 1993 readers' poll conducted by Super Famicom Magazine, ranking among Super Famicom titles at the number 219 spot. The game received generally favorable reviews from critics. Super Play's Jonathan Davies stated that the game was "a pretty good beat'em up with plenty of depth and challenging gameplay. Ultimately, though, it's not as good as Street Fighter II".
