= Pro Sport Hockey =

1993 video game

- North American Super NES cover art
- Developer: Tose
- Publisher: Jaleco
- Composer: Takeshi Ichida (SNES)
- Platforms: NES, Super NES
- Release: NES: JP: March 6, 1993; NA: November 1993; Super NES: JP: March 19, 1993; NA: February 1994
- Genre: Sports (ice hockey)
- Modes: Single-player, multiplayer

Pro Sport Hockey, known in Japan as USA Ice Hockey (ユーエスエーアイスホッケー, Yū Esu Ēa Isuhokkē), is an ice hockey video game that was released for the Nintendo Entertainment System and Super NES in 1993.

== Summary ==
The left winger is trying to shoot a slapshot past the goalie.

Each team uses the authentic NHL rosters from the 1992–93 NHL season; including all 24 then-current NHL teams and 288 professional hockey players.

An additional level of sponsorship from the National Hockey League Players' Association gave it an additional touch of legitimacy. There is also a practice and regular season mode on the Super Nintendo Entertainment System version of the game. All the offensive and defensive plays are done as realistic as possible. Major and minor penalties are called in addition to offside and icing. Game misconducts can be called at random by the referee; not even players with low levels of aggression like Wayne Gretzky and Eric Lindros can escape a game misconduct penalty. Regular season and exhibition games can end in a tie, bringing up the same end of game screen as if the player's team lost.

Instead of dividing teams into conferences and divisions, they are divided into six equal groups - just like in international ice hockey. There are no geographic differences between the teams on each group. This means that a Western Conference team could be in the same group as an Eastern Conference team or vice versa. The game uses teams that are now obsolete in the NHL, like the Minnesota North Stars, the Quebec Nordiques and the Hartford Whalers, for example. Wayne Gretzky even made an appearance in the game along with his legendary peers Doug Gilmour, Patrick Roy, and Mario Lemieux. Although the Winnipeg Jets are used in the game, they are not considered to be the current form of the team (which used to be the Atlanta Thrashers). Instead, they serve as the predecessors to the Phoenix Coyotes.

== Criticism ==
GamePro gave this game a 2 out of 5 rating in its November 1993 issue while Game Players gave this game a 49% rating in its December 1993 issue.

An energy system was made specifically for the Super NES version. The idea of the energy system was to be able to wear down the opponent's players in order to make the goalie too exhausted to block the player's shots. Turning the fatigue mode off in the options screen is akin to accessing God mode in most first-person shooters; it made games impossible to score in. The AI-controlled players love to scramble inwards for the puck, making passing an awkward affair for both teams. Every time a physical altercation is done on the ice, the players get even more exhausted - punishing the player for roughing above and beyond the penalty box.

== See also ==
- NHLPA Hockey '93, an ice hockey game based on the same NHL season
