= Sea Trader: Rise of Taipan =

2002 video game

- Developer: Jaleco Entertainment
- Publisher: Jaleco Entertainment
- Platform: Game Boy Advance
- Release: NA: December 20, 2002
- Genre: Simulation
- Mode: Single-player

Sea Trader: Rise of Taipan is a simulation video game developed and published by Jaleco Entertainment's American division. The game was released exclusively in North America in 2002 for the Game Boy Advance. In Sea Trader, the player controls a ship and tries to build a trading empire by selling goods between different ports. Reception was mixed, with praise for its addictive nature but criticism of its dated graphics and somewhat bare-bones gameplay.

== Gameplay ==
Sea Trader: Rise of Taipan is a shipping simulation game, where the player's goal is to make as much money as possible. The player makes profit by buying goods in one port and then selling them in another. Players can also use money to bribe customs officials into allowing them to offload illicit goods that are worth more money. The game takes place over a one, five, or ten-year period depending on the player's choice at the beginning of the game. Money is used to upgrade the player's ship, bribe bartenders into getting gossip and tips, as well as buying maps to access more ports among other things. Random encounters with pirates and other events happen during transit between ports—the action is always confined to menus, and contains little gameplay outside the economics simulation of the game.

== Reception ==
Reception

Aggregate score
Aggregator	Score
Metacritic	68/100

Review scores
Publication	Score
GamePro	3.5/5
GameSpot	7.1/10
IGN	6/10
Nintendo Power	3.2/5

The game received "average" reviews according to the review aggregation website Metacritic. Critics felt that the game managed to be addictive despite its lackluster gameplay and graphics. IGN's Craig Harris praised the game's replayability and addictive nature, but criticized its lack of "pizazz". GameSpot's Frank Provo called the game a "welcome change" and noted that it was a "relatively unique" experience for handheld systems like the Game Boy Advance. GamePro criticized the game for having "no action to speak of".
