= Chimera Beast =

2025 video game developed by C.P. Brain

Screenshot of Chimera Beast

Chimera Beast is an unreleased coin-operated arcade video game developed by C.P. Brain and planned to be released by Jaleco in 1993. It is a scrolling shooter with primarily horizontal movement.

In 2025, the game would get a release through the Polymega Collection.

== Plot ==
Chimera Beast takes place on a planet which is described as distant and Earth-like. The planet is overrun by monsters known as eaters, capable of eating other creatures and acquiring their abilities or characteristics. The player controls one of these eaters and progresses through the game by means of the food chain, consuming microscopic organisms in the first stage, fish in the second, and so on. When the player's creature eventually gets big enough to take on humanity, the goal of the game is revealed. The planet's humans have developed space travel, which the player must thwart, so as not to give the eaters a means of escaping the planet. After thwarting humanity's attempt to travel through space, player(s) wage one final duel against the Ultimate Eater. There are two possible endings: one in which the player is able to stop the eaters from escaping the planet, thereby trapping all Eaters in the planet and dooming them into cannibalizing each other to extinction, and one in which the eaters do escape and eventually make their way to Earth. It is interesting that the former ending is deemed 'good ending' while the latter ending is deemed 'bad ending' with the latter ending showing staff credits roll as if the latter is the true canonical ending.

== Gameplay ==
The chief innovation of Chimera Beast is its power-up system. Instead of collecting gun upgrades as in most games of this genre, the player's eater enhances itself by eating other creatures and assuming their abilities and defenses. Instead of simply having various types of projectile weaponry, the game attempts to make these new abilities as varied as possible. Consuming a crustacean might give the player's eater a hard protective shell, for example, while an insectoid creature might offer a venomous tail instead. The game even includes the ability to use cancer as a weapon.

Another difference from typical shooter mechanics is that the player's eater does not die after being hit. It has a life bar, which can be charged by consuming enemies. It is even possible to eat enough to charge the life bar past its starting position, creating a larger eater which is not only more powerful but can take more damage as well.

== Enemies ==
The enemies in Chimera Beast are mostly animals, some with equivalent Earth versions and some without. Some of the enemy creatures include jellyfish, a lamprey, clownfish, clams, flying squirrels, and moles. Once the player reaches the human stage, they face war vehicles such as tanks and jets.
