= Field Combat =

1985 video game

- Japanese arcade flyer
- Developers: Jaleco (arcade); Tose (Famicom)
- Publishers: JP: Jaleco; NA: Magic Electronics
- Platforms: Arcade, Famicom
- Release: Arcade: JP: April 1985; NA: 1985; EU: June 1985; Famicom: JP: July 9, 1985
- Genre: Scrolling shooter
- Modes: Single-player, multiplayer

Field Combat (Note: Japanese: フィールドコンバット, Hepburn: Firudo Konbatto) is a 1985 vertically scrolling shooter video game developed and published by Jaleco for arcades. In Field Combat, the player fights as a commanding officer in a futuristic battlefield. It was ported to the Famicom by Tose, which was later re-released for the Wii's Virtual Console in 2007. A sequel, Field Combat DX, was released for Japanese mobile phones in 2004.

== Gameplay ==
The object of the game is to make it all the way to the end of the battlefield using the Genesis, a warship that can fire off missiles. While the player controls the blue forces, the player must defeat the red forces without dying in the process by either avoiding or shooting helicopters, infantrymen, and tanks. An interesting characteristic of the game is that it is possible to ask for reinforcements from an army, which the player possesses, by pressing both the A and B buttons at the same time. The player can also use their special weapon to "absorb" the enemies and add them to their army. There is also an enemy UFO like spaceship that, when in battlefield, attempts to grab and escape with a player friendly unit (if there is any on the battlefield). It will also engage into air-to-air battle with a friendly helicopter (if there is any).

The game used classical music such as Richard Wagner's Ride of the Valkyries as its background music.

== Reception ==
In Japan, Game Machine listed Field Combat on their April 15, 1985 issue as being the ninth most-successful table arcade unit of the month.

Computer Gamer reviewed the arcade game, noting the gameplay is similar to Taito's Front Line (1982) from several years earlier and stating it is "quite good but very difficult to get the initial hang of".
