= Puchi Puchi Virus =

2007 video game

- US box art
- Developer: KeysFactory
- Publishers: JP: Jaleco; NA: NIS America
- Platform: Nintendo DS
- Release: JP: July 5, 2007; NA: May 19, 2009
- Genre: Puzzle video game
- Modes: Single-player, multiplayer

Puchi Puchi Virus (ぷちぷちウイルス, puchipuchi uirusu) is a puzzle video game developed by KeysFactory for the Nintendo DS. It was released in Japan by Jaleco on July 5, 2007 and in North America by NIS America on May 19, 2009.

== Story ==
In the game, a planet much like Earth has been affected by a horrible viral outbreak. Anybody infected turns into a weird monster with a pun for a name, such as the Flying Panduh, a panda with a jetpack, a frying pan and an aversion to country music. As the outbreak worsens, Dr. Kevin and his two assistants decide to take a stand against the disease using their newly invented vaccine.

== Characters ==
=== Dr. Kevin ===
The main character of the game, Dr. Kevin is a kind, eccentric genius who spends most of his time working in his lab.

=== Honeydew ===
Dr. Kevin's assistant, Honeydew is smart, quiet, and librarian-like. She will speak her mind if she thinks it is important and loves to cook even though she's bad at it.

=== George the Chicken ===
Kevin's other assistant, George claims to be a girl, but nobody is sure. Kevin and Honeydew suspect she might be infected with the Puchirus.

== Gameplay ==
=== Single-player ===
The game challenges players to link geometric viruses together to erase them before they turn into stones. Links are created by linking three viruses together into a triangle and then 'popping' this triangle to remove the viruses. Combos can be created by overlapping two triangles and then popping the first triangle created. There are 102 levels within the game, each having a different objective (a certain score, a certain number of combos etc. within a varying time limit).

=== Multiplayer ===
Multiplayer function of the game is head-to-head with single- and multi-card play.

Reception

Aggregate score
Aggregator	Score
Metacritic	73/100
