= Formation Z =

1984 video game

- Japanese arcade flyer
- Developers: Jaleco; Hect (Famicom)
- Publishers: JP: Jaleco; NA: Williams Electronics
- Platforms: Arcade, Family Computer, MSX, PC-88, Sharp X1, FM-7. Mobile phone
- Release: JP: July 1984; NA: February 1985
- Genre: Scrolling shooter
- Modes: Single-player, multiplayer

Formation Z (Note: Japanese: フォーメーションZ, Hepburn: Fōmēshon Z) is a 1984 horizontally scrolling shooter video game developed and published by Jaleco for arcades. It was released in North America by Williams Electronics as Aeroboto. It was later ported to the MSX and to the Famicom (by Hect), the latter being included as part of Jaleco Collection Vol. 1 for the PlayStation.

A remake titled FZ: Formation Z and developed by Granzella was released on May 25, 2026 by City Connection, Jaleco's successor.

== Gameplay ==
Arcade screenshot

The player controls a robot named Ixpel with the capability to transform into a jet fighter. The robot may move forwards, backwards and jump but cannot fly, and the fighter may travel anywhere on screen but has limited fuel in which to do so. Fuel status is indicated at the bottom right of the screen presented as numbers from 100 (fuel full) to 0 (fuel empty) which proceeds to decrease while playing as jet. When run out of fuel, the jet will fall but if the player is fighting where the ground is present he can revert to robot to avoid crashing (flying too low an altitude will still cause crash, however). If the jet is above an ocean on the other hand, it will crash and the player loses a life. Also the fighter cannot revert to robot when it is flying too high an altitude (on the center top of the screen directly below the top score indicator will tell the player whether he can revert or not). The combination of two performances must be used to avoid obstacles, as well as to destroy any on-screen enemies for extra points. As with typical arcade games, the robot/fighter will die in one hit from anything.

Because the jet consumes fuels to stay above air, its fuel needs to be constantly replenished. A white sphere emitting electricity on the ground is represented as a fuel to refill, which is the only item type the game has and the only item the player will ever need. To transform from robot to jet, a jump button must be pushed while joystick lever is pulled up. To revert from jet to robot, a jump button must be pushed down while the joystick lever is down during flight within the allowed altitude. While transforming, the player is unable to shoot and thus is vulnerable to enemy attacks so the transformation must be done at the right situation and with caution.

The player also has two types of firepower: first is Pulse Laser, a standard beam shot that can be fired consecutively. The second is a larger and stronger cannon named Big-Bang that can go through multiple smaller enemies. Big-Bang can be launched by charging up the main weapon. To shoot Big-Bang, shot button must be pushed down for about a second and a half. Big-Bang can be launched so long as shot button is kept being pushed down. Big-Bang can take out bigger enemies that Pulse Laser cannot and is crucial against boss battles. Without Big-Bang, Bosses cannot be defeated. In robot mode, player can shoot front, diagonal up and down. As a jet the player can shoot front, diagonal up and down on the direction the jet moves.

The game has two main arcs: first the battle on Earth and the second the battle in outer space. The first portion of Earth consists of mountainous grassland, and the second portion of Earth consists of an Egyptian desert. Between the first and second portion lies an ocean in which the player must transform into a jet to cross. Also at the end of desert begins an ocean where the first boss (named STV) awaits and in which the player once again must transform to cross. While unlikely if flying on high altitude flight, the chances of being crash-landed while avoiding boss' attacks during low altitude flight is still existent so low altitude flight during the boss battle is not recommended. After the boss is defeated using Big-Bang, the player then is catapulted into outer space to finish off the main force of alien invaders. Outer space, unlike Earth, has only one long ground battle phase before the land gives way to bottomless sky of space so the player as did previously must transform to avoid death and where the main alien superweapon awaits for a second boss battle with once again using Big-Bang. Conveniently, player does not have to worry about being crash-landed during the aerial battle in outer space. Boss battles of both Earth and in space take place in the air so the player will be fighting bosses while in jet mode. During the boss battles, the player does not have to worry about fuels being run out.

After the alien superweapon is destroyed, the game delivers player a short congratulatory comment, and the game restarts from Earth with new enemies and some enemies' patterns changed. This game, just like most arcade games at the time, has no true ending and loops endlessly.

== Re-releases ==
The game was released on the Virtual Console for the Wii on February 3, 2009, as well as the Wii U on March 29, 2017. Hamster Corporation released the game as part of their Arcade Archives series for the Nintendo Switch and PlayStation 4 on March 19, 2020.

== Reception ==
According to the Japanese magazine Game Machine, Formation Z was only a moderate success in arcades.
