= Lowrider (video game) =

2002 video game

- Developer: Pacific Century Cyber Works
- Publishers: JP: Pacific Century Cyber Works; NA: Jaleco Entertainment
- Platform: PlayStation 2
- Release: JP: December 19, 2002; NA: November 20, 2003
- Genre: Music video game
- Modes: Single-player, multiplayer

Lowrider, known in Japan as LowRider: Round the World (ローライダー 〜Round The World〜, RōRaidā 〜Raundo Za Wārudo〜), is a music video game developed and published by Pacific Century Cyber Works and Jaleco Entertainment for PlayStation 2.

== Reception ==
Reception

Aggregate score
Aggregator	Score
Metacritic	46/100

Review scores
Publication	Score
1Up.com	1.5/10
Edge	4/10
Electronic Gaming Monthly	4.17/10 (Note: Three critics of Electronic Gaming Monthly gave the game each a score of 5/10, 5.5/10, and 2/10.)
Famitsu	28/40
Game Informer	5/10
GameSpot	6.4/10
GameSpy	1/5
IGN	4/10
Official U.S. PlayStation Magazine	1.5/5
PlayStation: The Official Magazine	6/10

The game received "generally unfavorable reviews" according to the review aggregation website Metacritic. In Japan, Famitsu gave it a score of 28 out of 40. The only positive review came from Michael "Major Mike" Weigand of GamePro, who said that the game was "sure to hook fans of such games as PaRappa the Rapper and Um Jammer Lammy (or anyone with a cursory interest in lowriding for that matter) but—again—this is not a racing game." (Note: GamePro gave the game 3.5/5 for graphics, two 4/5 scores for sound and fun factor, and 4.5/5 for control.)
