= Plus Alpha =

1989 video game

- Arcade flyer
- Developer: Jaleco
- Publisher: Jaleco
- Composer: Tsukasa Tawada
- Series: Rod Land
- Platform: Arcade
- Release: JP: May 1989
- Genre: Multidirectional shooter
- Modes: Single-player, multiplayer

Plus Alpha (Note: Japanese: プラスアルファ, Hepburn: Purasu Arufa) is a 1989 multidirectional shooter video game developed and published by Jaleco for arcades. It was only released in Japan in May 1989. The game is known for its low difficulty compared to other shoot 'em ups as well as its anime-like art style reminiscent of Konami's TwinBee series. Hamster Corporation released the game as part of their Arcade Archives series for the Nintendo Switch and PlayStation 4 in April 2020.

== Gameplay ==
The player controls Selia and Rumy as they journey in spaceships to rescue seven countries from tyranny. Three different spaceships with unique attributes are available. To defeat enemies on the way, both characters can shoot them with two types of ammunition differing in size, damage and curvature, which can be changed by collecting power-ups and defeating enemies. A boss enemy appears at the end of every level that must be defeated to progress.
