= Fighter Ace (video game series) =

Combat flight simulation games series

Fighter Ace/Air Attack
- Developer: VR-1 Russia/BST Soft
- Publisher: Microsoft
- Designer: VR-1 Canada/Gemsoft
- Platform: Windows
- Release: December 1997
- Genre: Combat flight simulation game
- Modes: Single-player, multiplayer

Fighter Ace 2
- Developer: VR-1 Russia
- Publisher: VR-1
- Designer: VR-1 Canada
- Platform: Windows
- Genre: Combat flight simulation game
- Modes: Single-player, multiplayer

Fighter Ace 3
- Publisher: Ketsujin Studios
- Platform: Windows
- Release: 2002
- Genre: Combat flight simulation game
- Modes: Single-player, multiplayer

Fighter Ace was a massively multiplayer online combat flight simulation game series in which one flies World War II fighter planes in combat against other players and virtual pilots. Each of the games ran on a subscription-based model with players paying monthly to compete against each other. Microsoft, as well as later publishers, hosted tournaments in which players could compete against each other.

== Reception ==
The Wargamer reviewed version 3.6 and wrote: "Despite the aged graphics and simplified sounds, the rock-solid gameplay, seamless online connection, and large variety of aircraft will entertain any gamer for hours on end."
