= Rushing Beat =

- Genre: Beat 'em up
- Developers: Jaleco, CITY CONNECTION
- Publishers: Jaleco, CITY CONNECTION, Clear River Games
- First release: Rival Turf! March 27, 1992
- Latest release: RUSHING BEAT X: Return of Brawl Brothers; March 19, 2026

Rushing Beat (ラッシング・ビート) is a series of beat 'em up video games released by Jaleco for the Super Nintendo Entertainment System. Although all three games were released outside Japan, localization resulted in various changes to the games' storylines and gameplay. While all three titles were released under the Rushing Beat name in Japan, localized versions used three distinct titles and changed storylines and character names. In the Japanese versions, the storyline mainly revolves around two heroes, Rick Norton and Douglas Bild. The original English title refers to a rushing attack and the fact that Norton (a plainclothes detective) and Bild (a uniformed officer) are police officers working a beat. According to the Japanese storyline, the game locale's name is "Neo-Cisco", a futuristic San Francisco, California.

== Gameplay ==
The games play like typical beat'em ups, with both jump and attack buttons. The attack button allows players to use a standing combination of attacks, as well as jumping attacks, holds and throws. Each game features a one or two player mode, in which the player must defeat a plethora of enemies using punches, kicks and various weapons collected throughout the course of the game. Like other games in the genre, a powerful special attack can also be launched, at the cost of some of the player's health. Later games in the series added additional super attacks that could be performed using various button/directional combinations. One of the main features of the series is the "Angry" (Original Japanese: "Ikari") mode where the character, after taking enough damage, becomes temporarily invincible and has more powerful throws. The games have also featured versus modes, in which up to four players (in the third game) can battle each other.

Later in Rushing Beat X, it introduces new mechanics. The normal combo systems introduces double jump (Kazan's case is triple jump), run / step dash to dash attack, and air combats (eg.: a launcher to jump cancel then aerial attacks). the special attacks no longer cost health. A new gauge system called "Rage" gauge allows player to get a power up mode, and can only use a super move when entering the Rage mode at full gauge, ending the state.

== Games ==
The first entry to the series is Rushing Beat. The game was released outside Japan as Rival Turf!, but Western versions omitted the game's introduction scene and changed the names of the game's protagonists from "Rick Norton" and "Douglas Bild" to "Jack Flak" and "Oozie Nelson" respectively.

The second game in the series is Rushing Beat Ran. The game retained the playable characters from the first game in the series and added several other playable characters. The game was released in Western markets as Brawl Brothers. Norton and Bild's names were again changed, this time to "Hack" and "Slash". The Japanese version is playable in Brawl Brothers through the use of a cheat code.

The third and final game in the series is Rushing Beat Shura. The game included new player characters, branching story paths, new special moves and several different endings. Rick Norton is available as a secret character while Douglas Bild only makes a hidden cameo appearance. The game was released outside Japan as The Peace Keepers, with various changes and omissions affecting the game's storyline, gameplay and soundtrack.

The revival game in the series is RUSHING BEAT X: Return Of Brawl Brothers, released on March 19, 2026. It takes place between Brawl Brothers and The Peace Keepers, and the game is 3D modeled, powered by Unity game engine. With all playable characters from Brawl Brothers return, it introduces two new playable characters, Kahlua, an amnesiac gyaru uses self-taught fighting style resembles Jeet Kune Do, and Juliet Rorinzam, a recurring boss of the game who is a Gunslinging cyber clone maid servant with mysterious to the series antagonist, Kulmbach, and is also a hidden unlockable character.

Japanese title	Western title
Rushing Beat (1992)	Rival Turf! (1992)
Rushing Beat Ran — Fukusei Toshi (1992)	Brawl Brothers (1993)
Rushing Beat Shura (1993)	The Peace Keepers (1994)
RUSHING BEAT X: Return of Brawl Brothers (2026)	RUSHING BEAT X: Return of Brawl Brothers (2026)
