= Piko Interactive =

American video game company

Piko Interactive LLC
- Type: Private
- Industry: Video games
- Founded: 2013; 13 years ago
- Founder: Eli Galindo
- Headquarters: San Antonio, Texas, U.S.
- Area served: Worldwide
- Key people: Eli Galindo
- Website: pikointeractive.com

Piko Interactive LLC is an American video game publisher based in San Antonio, Texas. Founded in early 2013 by Eli Galindo, the company focuses on physical re-releases of games from older video game consoles and digitally released ports to newer systems.

== History ==
Founder Eli Galindo started Piko Interactive in 2013. In March, the company launched its first crowdfunding campaign on Kickstarter to fund a physical release of Super 4 in 1 Multicart for the SNES, with a funding goal of $10,500. The cartridge consists of four games from three developers. This campaign was successfully funded with $15,050 on 184 backers.

On July 16, 2016, Piko Interactive and Wisdom Tree launched a crowdfunding campaign on Kickstarter to fund "Wisdom Tree Return with Arkade Plug and Play", with a funding goal of $16,500. It was successfully funded with $25,965 on 341 backers.

On August 4, 2017, Piko Interactive and Wisdom Tree launched another crowdfunding campaign on Kickstarter to fund a physical release of 3 different games (Noah's Ark for NES, Mega 3D Noah's Ark for Sega Genesis, and Wisdom Tree Collection for GBA), with a funding goal of $15,000. It was successfully funded with $17,196 on 200 backers.

On January 2, 2018, Piko announced the acquisition of 60 titles, giving the company control over more than 100 IPs. The acquisition consisted of mostly original works owned by Atari SA. While the specific titles were not announced, the games were previously developed by Infogrames, Ocean Software, Legend Entertainment, Beam Software, Accolade, Hasbro Interactive, GT Interactive, MicroProse, and Spectrum Holobyte.

At the same time, Piko announced its intention to move away from homebrew titles and split the company into three focuses: physical releases, digital releases, and retro console releases. By this point, Piko had over a dozen employees and worked with a partner factory to develop new cartridges.

On February 12, 2018, Piko launched a crowdfunding campaign on Kickstarter to fund a physical release of the canceled Nintendo 64 port of 40 Winks, with a funding goal of $20,000. The game is the first for the system by Piko, and the first new title for the Nintendo 64 since its discontinuation. It was successfully funded in a matter of hours.

On May 28, 2019, Piko launched another crowdfunding campaign on Kickstarter, this time to fund the production of an action figure line based on the game Switchblade, with a funding goal of $8,500. As part of the Kickstarter, they will launch a new brand called "Toyetico", which will focus on making toy lines for their products. This campaign was successfully funded with $9,525 on 170 backers. On August 9, 2019, 20 of their games were announced to be released on the Evercade console.

On January 15, 2020, Piko Interactive launched a crowdfunding campaign on Kickstarter to fund a physical release of Jim Power in Monster Planet for Turbografx and Amiga CD32 and Jim Power: The Lost Dimension for a NES, SNES, and Genesis, with a funding goal of $50,000. The campaign was successfully funded with $63,805 from 678 backers. In 2022, a physical release of The Lost Dimension was announced for Switch and PS4, including the SNES version, a completed version of the unreleased Genesis game, and a newly developed NES port.

In April 2020, Piko announced the acquisition of the rights to 1998 3D platformer O.D.T., including an unreleased Nintendo 64 version. This was released in 2022.

In May 2020, Piko announced it had acquired the IP rights to SNK Playmore's 2002 tag team fighting game Rage of the Dragons. Piko worked with QUByte Interactive to develop Rage of the Dragons Neo, a re-release that added netplay, training mode, and survival mode to the game. It was released in November 2024 for PC, PlayStation 5, PlayStation 4, Xbox Series X/S, Xbox One, and Switch. A physical edition was also released for PS5, Switch, and original NEO GEO hardware.

On January 4, 2021, Piko announced that they had acquired the Bleem! brand name, with plans to start a retrogaming-focused online storefront titled Bleem Powered. In a 2024 blog post, Galindo announced his intention to launch bleem.net as a one-stop-shop for buying, watching, reading, and playing all the videos games, cartoon, toys, and comics Piko now owns.

On March 2, 2021, Piko Interactive co-launched a crowdfunding campaign on Kickstarter with Comix.tv to fund a physical release of Stone Protectors, a Sega Genesis unreleased game and special edition animated series box set with 5 unreleased episodes. The campaign was successfully funded with $33,557 pledged of its $30,000 goal from 371 backers. The Genesis version of the game was released in 2022, while the SNES version was added to Antstream Arcade in July 2024.

In February 2022, Piko, Bleem!, and Crave Entertainment released the 1999 PlayStation game Shadow Madness on PC via Steam. On October 3, 2022, Piko Interactive co-launched another crowdfunding campaign on Kickstarter with Comix.tv to fund The Legend of Calamity Jane special DVD box set and special edition comic to celebrate the series’ 25th anniversary in 2022. The campaign was successfully funded with $24,284 pledged of its $15,000 goal from 426 backers.

== Games published ==
=== Physical releases ===
Game	Release date	System	Genre	Developer	Notes
Super 4 in 1 Multicart	2013-12-14	Super NES	Miscellaneous/Compilation	Piko Interactive LLC	Compilation of 4 games from 3 different developers. Funded via Kickstarter.
AstroHawk	2013	Super NES	Shoot 'em Up	Paul Lay	Free space shooter similar to Asteroids.
Super 3D Noah's Ark	SNES re-print 2013-12-31; Genesis; 2018-05	Super NES, Genesis	First-Person Shooter	Wisdom Tree	A newly developed Sega Genesis port is called Mega 3D Noah's Ark. It was funded via Kickstarter.
Mazezam Challenge	2013	Super NES	Puzzle	Alekmaul	A puzzle video game.
UWOL: Quest for Money	2013	Super NES	Action/Platformer	Alekmaul	A port of a ZX Spectrum game by The Mojon Twins.
N-Warp Daisakusen	2013	Super NES	Action/Fighting	Gra	A 2-8 player free-for-all fighting game.
Rockfall	2013	Super NES	Puzzle/Action	Paul Lay	A Boulder Dash clone developed back in 1995/6.
Classic Kong	2014-01-11	Super NES	Platformer	Bubble Zap Games	A Donkey Kong clone.
Creepy Bird	2014-03-17	Super NES	Action/Arcade	Piko Interactive LLC	A horror-themed Flappy Bird clone.
Mr. Bloppy Saves the World	2014	Super NES	Educational Platformer	Compedia	A previously unreleased game.
Super Thor Quest	2014	Super NES	Platformer	Bubble Zap Games	A Donkey Kong clone.
Apocalypse II	2015-05-22	Super NES	Shoot-'Em-Up	Psygnosis	A previously unreleased game.
Dorke and Ymp	2015-08-06	Super NES	Action Adventure	Norse	A previously unreleased game.
Corn Buster	2015-08-06	Super NES	Action	Engine Software	A previously unreleased game. It has similar gameplay to Devilish for the Sega Genesis.
Hind Strike	2015-08-06	Super NES	Simulation/Flight/Combat	Bubble Zap Games	A top-view military shooter which is inspired by the bonus levels from Pilotwings for SNES. The game features 16-bit graphics with Mode 7 rotating effects.
Water Margin - The Tales of Clouds and Winds	2015-08-06	Genesis	Beat-'Em-Up	Never Ending Soft Team	A translated Genesis game previously available only in China (Taiwan and Hong Kong markets mostly) during the late 1990s.
Quest Forge: By Order of Kings	2015-09-05	NES	Action Adventure	Ludosity Interactive	A new game for the NES.
Duke Nukem 3D	2015-10-16	Genesis	First-Person Shooter	TecToy	Previously available only in Brazil during the late 1990s.
Broken Circle	2015-11-06	Game Boy Advance	Role-playing	7 Raven Studios	A previously unreleased game.
World Reborn	2015-11-06	Game Boy Advance	Shoot-'Em-Up	NeoPong Software	A previously unreleased game.
Anguna - Warriors of Virtue	2015-11-06	Game Boy Advance	Action Adventure	Bite the Chili Productions	A game previously released in 2008.
Legend	SNES re-print 2017-01-30	Super NES	Beat-'Em-Up	Arcade Zone	A 2017 re-print version.
Iron Commando: Koutetsu no Senshi	2017-01-30	Super NES	Beat-'Em-Up	Arcade Zone	The SNES 2017 release is fully translated in English.
Wisdom Tree NES Collection	2017-01-30	NES	Miscellaneous/Compilation	Wisdom Tree	A compilation of 7 NES games in one cartridge. The package includes these following games: Bible Adventures, Spiritual Warfare, Exodus, Joshua & the Battle of Jericho, Sunday Funday, Bible Buffet, and King of Kings.
Snakky	2017-01-30	NES	Action/Arcade	Shiru	A Snake clone.
Wisdom Tree Sega Genesis Collection	2017-01-30	Genesis	Miscellaneous/Compilation	Wisdom Tree	A compilation of 4 Sega Genesis games in one cartridge. The package includes these following games: Bible Adventures, Spiritual Warfare, Exodus, and Joshua & the Battle of Jericho.
Generals of the Yang Family	2017-01-30	Genesis	Beat-'Em-Up	Unknown	A translated version of Yi Men Ying Lie: Yang Jia Jiang that previously was available only in China (Taiwan and Hong Kong markets mostly) during the 1990s.
Smart Mouse	2017-01-30	Genesis	Puzzle	Chuanpu	A translated version of Huan Le Tao Qi Shu: Smart Mouse that previously was available only in China (Taiwan and Hong Kong markets mostly) during the 1990s.
Sumo Slam	2017-01-30	Genesis	Action/Arcade	Segaman	
Custodian	Jaguar; 2017-01-30; Genesis 2018–05; GBA 2019-04-15	Atari Jaguar, Genesis, Game Boy Advance	Arcade/Shooter	Realms Software Concepts	A port of an Atari ST/ Amiga game.
Escape From Atlantis	2017-04-13	NES	Action/Arcade	Color Dreams	A previously unreleased game.
Free Fall	2017-04-13	NES	Action/Arcade	Color Dreams	A previously unreleased game.
Waimanu: Grinding Blocks Adventure	2017-04-13	Game Boy Advance	Action/Puzzle	Disjointed Studio	A game previously released in 2013.
Switchblade	Jaguar; 2017-09-07; Genesis 2019-04-15	Atari Jaguar, Genesis	Action/Platformer	Core Design	A port of the Atari ST/ Amiga game.
Noah's Ark	2018-02	NES	Platformer	Source Research & Development	Previously available only in European regions in 1992. It was funded via Kickstarter.
Wisdom Tree GBA Collection	2018-02	Game Boy Advance	Miscellaneous/Compilation	Wisdom Tree	A compilation of 7 GBA games in one cartridge. The package includes these following games: Bible Adventures, Spiritual Warfare, Exodus, Joshua & the Battle of Jericho, Sunday Funday, Bible Buffet, and King of Kings. It was funded via Kickstarter.
Brave Battle Saga: The Legend of the Magic Warrior	2018-05	Genesis	RPG	Chuanpu	A translated version of Barver Battle Saga: Tai Kong Zhan Shi that previously was available only in China (Taiwan and Hong Kong markets mostly) during the 1990s.
The Humans	2018-05	Super NES	Platformer/Puzzle	Imagitec Design	Previously available only in PAL regions in 1992.
Pinkie	2018-05	Super NES	Platformer	Data Design Interactive	A previously unreleased game.
Tyrannosaurus Tex	2018-05	Game Boy Color	First Person Shooter	Slitherine Software	A previously unreleased game.
40 Winks	2019-04-15	N64	Platformer	Eurocom	A previously unreleased game. It was funded via Kickstarter.
Head Over Heels	2019-04-15	Atari Jaguar	Action	Ocean Software	A port of the Atari ST/ Amiga game.
Impossamole	2019-04-15	Atari Jaguar	Platformer	Core Design	A port of the Atari ST/ Amiga game.
Little Lancelot	2019-04-15	NES	Platformer	Ocean Software	Re-release version of The Legend of Prince Valiant for NES.
Pyramids of Ra	2019-04-15	NES	Puzzle	Source the Software House	A previously unreleased game.
Exploding Fist	2019-04-15	NES	Fighting	Beam Software	A previously unreleased game.
Gourmet Warriors	2019-04-15	Super NES	Beat-'Em-Up	Winds	Official English translation for international release.
Tinhead	2019-04-15	Super NES	Platformer	MicroProse	A previously unreleased game.
Canon - Legends Of The New Gods	2019-04-15	Genesis	RPG	Chuanpu	A translated version of Feng Shen Ying Jie Chuan that previously was available only in China (Taiwan and Hong Kong markets mostly) during the 1990s.
Thunderbolt II	2019-04-15	Genesis	Shoot-'Em-Up	Ming Super Chip	A translated version of Lei Dian Chuan Shuo II that previously was available only in China (Taiwan and Hong Kong markets mostly) during the 1990s.
Piko Interactive Collection 1	2020-06-18	Evercade	Miscellaneous/Compilation	Various	A compilation of 20 vintage games in one cartridge. The package includes these following games: 8 Eyes, Brave Battle Sage: Legend of the Magic Warrior, Canon: The Legend of the New Gods, Drakkhen, Dragon View, Dorke and Ymp, Iron Commando, The Immortal, Jim Power: The Lost Dimension, Magic Girl, Nightshade, Power Piggs of the Dark Ages, Power Punch II, Radical Rex, Switchblade, The Humans, Tinhead, Top Racer, The Way of the Exploding Fist, and Water Margin.
Piko Interactive Collection 2	2021-04	Evercade	Miscellaneous/Compilation	Various	A compilation of 13 vintage sports games in one cartridge. The package includes these following games: Beast Ball, Eliminator Boat Duel, Football Madness, Full Throttle: All-American Racing, Hoops Shut Up and Jam, Hoops Shut Up and Jam 2, Power Football, Racing Fever, Soccer Kid, Summer Challenge, Top Racer 2, Winter Challenge, and World Trophy Soccer.
Gaelco Arcade 1	2022-01-14	Evercade	Miscellaneous/Compilation	Gaelco	A compilation of 6 vintage arcade games in one cartridge. The package includes these following games: Alligator Hunt, Biomechanical Toy, Glass, Snowboard Championship, Thunder Hoop, and World Rally
Gaelco Arcade 2	2022-07-29	Evercade	Miscellaneous/Compilation	Gaelco	A compilation of 6 vintage arcade games in one cartridge. The package includes these following games: Big Karnak, TH Strikes Back: Thunder Hoop 2, World Rally 2, Maniac Square, Squash, and Touch and Go
Piko Interactive Collection 3	2023-05-31	Evercade	Miscellaneous/Compilation	Various	A compilation of 10 vintage games in one cartridge. The package includes these following games: 40 Winks, Zero Tolerance, Legend of Wukong, Stanley: The Search for Dr. Livingston, Super Bubble Pop, Metal Mech: Man & Machine, Radikal Bikers, Motor City Patrol, Punch King, and Sword of Sodan.
Piko Interactive Collection 4	2024-04-30	Evercade	Miscellaneous/Compilation	Various	A compilation of 10 vintage games in one cartridge. The package includes these following games: Glover, Risky Woods, Street Racer, Zero Tolerance Underground, Sküljagger: Revolt of the Westicans, Bad Street Brawler, The Fidgetts, Mermaids of Atlantis, Star X, Target: Renegade.

=== Digital releases ===
Games released under a new label called "Classics Digital", which concentrates on publishing the games that they acquired in popular digital distribution channels like Steam Greenlight and GOG.com.

Game	Release date	System	Genre	Developer	Notes
Super 3D Noah's Ark	Steam 2015-06-24	Windows, macOS, Linux	First-Person Shooter	Wisdom Tree	Steam package includes SNES and DOS versions.
Jim Power: The Lost Dimension	Steam 2015-10-01	Windows	Platformer	Loriciel	Steam package includes SNES and DOS versions.
Legend	Steam 2015-11-11	Windows	Beat-'Em-Up	Arcade Zone	Steam package includes the original SNES version.
Iron Commando: Koutetsu no Senshi	Steam 2016-07-13	Windows	Beat-'Em-Up	Arcade Zone	Steam package includes the translated SNES version.
Dorke and Ymp	Steam 2016-10-19	Windows	Action Adventure	Norse	Steam package includes the original SNES version.
Spiritual Warfare & Wisdom Tree Collection	Steam 2017-04-25	Windows, macOS, Linux	Action	Wisdom Tree	The package includes 4 original DOS games by Wisdom Tree: Spiritual Warfare, Bible Adventures, Exodus, and Joshua & the Battle of Jericho.
The Humans Bundle	GOG 2017-07-13; Steam 2018-06-06	Windows, macOS, Linux	Platformer/Puzzle	Imagitec Design	The package includes the original DOS versions of The Humans, The Humans 2: The Jurassic Levels, and The Humans III: Evolution - Lost in Time.
Alien Rampage	GOG 2017-08-03; Steam 2017-10-12	Windows, macOS, Linux	Action	Inner Circle Creations	The package includes the original DOS version.
Daemonsgate	Steam 2017-10-26	Windows, macOS, Linux	RPG	Imagitec Design	The package includes the original DOS version.
King's Table - The Legend of Ragnarok	Steam 2017-10-26	Windows, macOS, Linux	Simulation/Board Game	Imagitec Design	The package includes the original DOS version.
Prophecy 1: The Viking Child	Steam 2017-10-26	Windows, macOS, Linux	Action	Imagitec Design	The package includes the original DOS version.
Death Gate	GOG 2018-01-03	Windows, macOS, Linux	Adventure/Puzzle	Legend Entertainment	The package includes the original DOS version.
Bubble Ghost	Steam 2018-02-09	Windows	Action	ERE Informatique, Infogrames	The package includes original the DOS version.
Chamber of the Sci-Mutant Priestess	Steam 2018-02-09	Windows	Adventure/Puzzle	ERE Informatique, Infogrames	The package includes the original DOS version.
Chaos Control	Steam 2018-02-09	Windows	Rail Shooters	Infogrames	The package includes the original DOS version.
Drakkhen	Steam 2018-02-09; GOG 2018-06-26	Windows	RPG	Infogrames	The package includes the original DOS version.
Eternam	Steam 2018-02-09; GOG 2019-07-01	Windows	Adventure	Infogrames	The package includes the original DOS version.
Hostage: Rescue Mission	Steam 2018-02-09	Windows	Action	Infogrames	The package includes the original DOS version.
Marco Polo	Steam 2018-02-09	Windows	Simulation	Infogrames	The package includes the original DOS version.
Mystical	Steam 2018-02-09	Windows	Action/2D-scrolling Shooter	Infogrames	The package includes original the DOS version.
Time Gate: Knight's Chase	Steam 2018-02-09; GOG 2019-12-20	Windows, macOS, Linux	Adventure/Puzzle	Infogrames	The package includes the original DOS version.
Eric the Unready	GOG 2018-04-12; Steam 2019-01-28	Windows	Point-and-click/Adventure	Legend Entertainment	The package includes the original DOS version.
Central Intelligence	Steam 2018-04-14	Windows	Strategy	Ocean Software	The package includes original the DOS version.
Elf	Steam 2018-04-14	Windows	Action/Platformer	Ocean Software	The package includes the original DOS version.
Last Rites	Steam 2018-04-14	Windows	1st-person Shooter	Ocean Software	The package includes the original DOS version.
Pushover	Steam 2018-04-14	Windows	Platformer/Puzzle	Ocean Software	The package includes the original DOS version.
Sleepwalker	Steam 2018-04-14	Windows	Platformer/Strategy	Ocean Software	The package includes the original DOS version.
The Great Escape	Steam 2018-04-14	Windows	Strategy/Adventure	Denton Designs, Ocean Software	The package includes the original DOS version.
Tunnel B1	Steam 2018-04-14	Windows	1st-person Shooter	NEON Software, Ocean Software	The package includes the original DOS version.
Where Time Stood Still	Steam 2018-04-14	Windows	Arcade Adventure	Denton Designs, Ocean Software	The package includes the original DOS version.
The Dame Was Loaded	GOG 2018-04-19; Steam 2019-01-28	Windows	Point-and-click Adventure	Beam Software	The package includes the original DOS version.
Spellcasting 101+102+103	GOG 2018-04-26; Steam 2019-03-18	Windows	Text Adventure/Puzzle	Legend Entertainment	The package includes the original DOS version.
Mission Critical	GOG 2018-05-09; Steam 2019-01-28	Windows	Adventure/Puzzle	Legend Entertainment	The package includes the original DOS version.
40 Winks	Steam 2018-10-22	Windows	Action Platformer	Eurocom	The package includes the original PS1 version.
Dragon View	Steam 2019-01-22	Windows	RPG	Infogrames	The package includes the original SNES version.
Nightshade	Steam 2019-03-07	Windows	Action Adventure	Beam Software	The package includes the original NES version.
Radical Rex	Steam 2019-03-07	Windows	Action Platformer	Beam Software	The package includes the original SNES version.
Minskies: The Abduction	Steam 2019-03-09	Windows	Puzzle	Binary Emotions	The package includes the previously unreleased DOS version.
Brave Battle Saga: The Legend of the Magic Warrior	Steam 2019-03-18	Windows	RPG	Chuanpu	The package includes the original Sega Genesis version.
Gourmet Warriors	Steam 2019-07-04	Windows	Beat-'Em-Up	Winds	The package includes the translated SNES version.
Superhero League of Hoboken	GOG 2019-01-29; Steam 2019-07-04	Windows	Adventure	Legend Entertainment	The package includes the original DOS version.
Water Margin - The Tales of Clouds and Winds	Steam 2019-07-04	Windows	Beat-'Em-Up	Never Ending Soft Team	The package includes the original Sega Genesis version.
Soccer Kid	Steam 2019-07-10	Windows	Platformer	Krisalis Software	The package includes the original DOS version.
Head Over Heels	Steam 2019-08-09	Windows	Action	Retrospec	The remake of the original game in the modern graphic.
Brutal Sports Football	Steam 2019-08-13	Windows	Action	Teque London	The package includes the original DOS version.
Legends	Steam 2019-08-13	Windows	Adventure/RPG	Krisalis Software	The package includes the original DOS version.
8 Eyes	Steam 2019-08-15	Windows	Platformer	Thinking Rabbit	The package includes the original NES version.
The Gadget Twins	Steam 2019-08-20	Windows	Beat-'Em-Up	Imagitec Design	The package includes the original Sega Genesis version.
Power Punch II	Steam 2019-08-23	Windows	Sport (Boxing)	Beam Software, American Softworks	The package includes the original NES version.
Switchblade	Steam 2019-08-23	Windows	Action/Platformer	Core Design	The package includes the new Sega Genesis version.
Tinhead	Steam 2019-08-23	Windows	Platformer	MicroProse	The package includes the original SNES version.
Impossamole	Steam 2019-09-03	Windows	Platformer	Core Design	The package includes the original TurboGrafx-16 version.
DethKarz	GOG 2019-12-20	Windows	Futuristic racing	Beam Software	The package includes the original DOS version.
EPIC + Inferno Bundle	GOG 2019-12-20	Windows, macOS, Linux	Space flight	Digital Image Design	The package includes original the DOS version of Epic and Inferno.
Hexplore	GOG 2019-12-20	Windows	RPG	Heliovisions Productions	The package includes the original DOS version.
The Legacy: Realm of Terror	GOG 2019-12-20	Windows, macOS, Linux	Adventure/RPG	Magnetic Scrolls, MicroProse	The package includes the original DOS version.
Motor Mash	Steam 2020-08-07	Windows	Racing	Eutechnyx, Ocean Software	The package includes the original PS1 version.
Zero Tolerance	Steam 2020-08-18	Windows	First-person shooter	Technopop, Accolade	The package includes the original Genesis version.
Blender Bros.	Steam 2020-08-25	Windows	Platformer	Hudson Soft, Infogrames	The package includes the original Game Boy Advance version.
Noah's Ark	Steam 2021-03-30	Windows	Platform game	Source Research & Development	The package includes the original NES version.
Attack of the Mutant Penguins	Steam 2021-03-30	Windows	Tower defense game	Sunrise Games, Atari	The package includes the original DOS version.
The Immortal	Steam 2021-03-30	Windows	Action-adventure game	Sandcastle	The package includes the original DOS version.
Super Hunchback	Steam 2021-06-02	Windows	Platformer	Ocean Software	The package includes the original Game Boy version.
First Samurai	Steam 2021-07-23	Windows	Beat 'em up	Vivid Image, Image Works	
Street Racer	Steam 2021-08-02	Windows	Kart racing	Vivid Image	The package includes the DOS and 16-bit versions.
Shadow Madness	Steam 2022-02-15	Windows	RPG	Lobotomy Software, Crave Entertainment	The package includes the original PS1 version.
Second Samurai	Steam 2022-02-16	Windows	Action	Vivid Image	
Stone Protectors	Steam 2022-03-15	Windows	Beat 'em up	Eurocom, Kemco	The package includes the original Super NES version.
O.D.T.: Escape... Or Die Trying	Steam 2022-04-05	Windows	action-adventure	FDI	The package includes the original Windows version.
Glover	Steam 2022-04-20; GOG 2022-04-20; Nintendo Switch, PlayStation 4, PlayStation 5, Xbox One, Xbox Series X/S, Release Date TBA	Windows	Platformer	Interactive Studios	The package includes a new port based on the original Nintendo 64 version.
Zany Golf	GOG 2022-12-19	Windows	Sports	Sandcastle Productions	The package includes the original DOS version.
Dark Rift	GOG 2023-01-24	Windows	Fighting game	Kronos Digital Entertainment	The package includes the original N64 version.
The Humans: Meet the Ancestors!	GOG 2023-01-25	Windows	Action-puzzle	Blue Monkey Studios	The package includes the original Windows version.
Meat Puppet	Steam 2023-02-01	Windows	Action/platformer/puzzle/shooter	Kronos Digital Entertainment	The package includes the original Windows version.
Risky Woods	Steam 2023-02-01	Windows	Platformer	Dinamic Software, Zeus Software	

== Games acquired ==
- Battle Squadron (Amiga, Genesis)
- Onslaught (Amiga, Atari ST, PC, Mega Drive)
- Sword of Sodan (Amiga, Genesis)
- Skweek (Amiga, Atari ST, Atari Lynx, PC, Amstrad CPC, Game Gear, PC Engine)
- Shui Hu Zhuan (Genesis)
- Tun Shi Dian Ti III (Genesis)
- Ya Se Chuan Shuo (Genesis)
- Fireteam Rogue (Super NES, Genesis)
- Mysterious Song (Super NES)
- Dragon Sword (N64)
- Glover (N64)
- Rage of the Dragons (Arcade, Neo Geo AES)
