= UWC =

UWC may refer to:

== Businesses and organisations ==
- Ukrainian World Congress, for Ukrainian diaspora
- Ulster Workers' Council, Northern Ireland
- United World Colleges
- University of the Western Cape, South Africa
- University of Wisconsin Colleges, United States
- Ultimate Warrior Challenge Mexico, a Mexican mixed martial arts promotion
- Universal Wrestling Corporation, now World Championship Wrestling

== Other uses ==
- UWC (video game), a c. 1988 unreleased wrestling game for NES
- Unified World Champion, in wrestling
- User Worked Crossing, a type of level crossing
