= Kauppinen (surname) =

Kauppinen is a Finnish surname. Notable people with the surname include:

- Aarne Kauppinen (1889–1927), Finnish artisan, smallholder and politician
- Hannele Kauppinen (born 1955), Finnish singer known by her stage name Taiska
- Marko Kauppinen (born 1979), Finnish ice hockey player
- Juho Kauppinen (born 1986), Finnish accordionist
- Jarkko Kauppinen (born 1992), Finnish biathlete
- Liisa Kauppinen (born 1939), Finnish human rights activist
- Sean Kauppinen, American video game executive
