= Dragon Sword =

Cancelled video game

- Developers: Interactive Studios; (Team Storm)
- Publisher: MGM Interactive
- Producer: Ian Pestridge
- Designer: Robin Butler
- Artist: Stephen Rushbrook
- Platforms: Nintendo 64, Microsoft Windows, PlayStation
- Release: Unreleased
- Genres: Beat 'em up, action role-playing
- Modes: Single-player, multiplayer

Dragon Sword (Note: Also known as Dragon Sword 64.) is an unreleased action role-playing game that was in development by Interactive Studios and planned to be published by MGM Interactive for the Nintendo 64, Windows and PlayStation. In the game, players would have assume the role from one of the four crusaders battling with monsters on a quest against an evil god to save the land of Avantaria and free its people from enslavement. Its gameplay consists of melee focused fights against multiple enemies in dungeon crawler styled levels.

Dragon Sword was developed over the course of more than two years by Team Storm, a group within Interactive Studios and was originally envisioned as a The Legend of Zelda-style adventure game with role-playing elements before the idea was ultimately reworked into a Tekken-style arcade-like hybrid with an emphasis on combat influenced by Rastan Saga, Golden Axe and Vendetta, as well as multiple works in the fantasy genre over exploration. Announced in 1997, the title was intended to be the last release by MGM Interactive before being canceled due to doubts of not selling enough copies to turn a profit and lack of publisher, despite being near-complete. Prior to cancellation, it received a positive reception from 64 Magazine. In 2019, Piko Interactive acquired the rights and source code of the title, with plans to finish its development.

== Gameplay ==
Gameplay screenshot from a leaked beta build.

Dragon Sword is a fantasy themed beat-em-up reminiscent of Golden Axe, Soul of the Samurai and Gauntlet Legends where players would have assume the role from one of the four crusaders battling with monsters on a quest against an evil god to save the land of Avantaria and free its people from enslavement as the main objective. The plot was going to revolve around an evil god invading the land of Avantaria, enslaving the people and destroy their light god. The light god called upon four crusaders (Cutter, Kailan, Aisha and Gouranga) to respond his call and defeat the enemy. In addition to the single-player campaign, the game was going to feature a two-player co-op mode as well as a four-player deathmatch comprising four different gameplay types. The title was also going to support the Rumble Pak.

== Development ==
Early concept art. Dragon Sword was originally envisioned as a medieval adventure title with role-playing game elements before being ultimately reworked into a fantasy-themed arcade-style hybrid instead.

Dragon Sword was developed over the course of more than two years by Team Storm, a group within Interactive Studios of approximately nine people, being three programmers and six art designers, led by assistant creative manager Ian Pestridge. Robin Butler served as lead animator and art director for the second level, as well as game and character designer. Stephen Rushbrook acted externally as the sole concept artist for the project during the first three years of the project's production, drafting between three and seven artworks per day using A4 paper. Most of the staff recounted about the project's development process and history through various publications.

According to Pestridge, Dragon Sword originated as a medieval adventure game in the vein of The Legend of Zelda titled Dragon Storm, featuring heavy role-playing elements before the team reworked their project into a more arcade-style genre hybrid that combined both Tekken and The Legend of Zelda, emphasizing combat action over conversation and exploration. Pestridge stated that the idea sat within the staff's mind, most of which were fans of the fantasy genre, J. R. R. Tolkien, Dungeons & Dragons and films such as Conan the Barbarian. Pestridge also stated that the team wanted to replicate 16-bit era titles like Golden Axe and Streets of Rage on the 3D era but featuring better graphics and playability, as Butler remarked that the staff were also fans of the former. Both Pestridge and Rushbrook stated that the project was renamed to Dragon Sword, as the team found out that another game had the same previous name but the original title became the official name for Team Storm, as the staff liked said title.

Pestridge stated that ten levels would be present in the final version but several elements and ideas were either changed or scrapped due to time and cartridge space constraints such as the plot, the number of weapons being heavily reduced, the ability to ride beasts and the ability to transform into a dragon and fight mid-air. In a 2009 interview, Rushbrook remarked being unsure how much of his original work remained in the final release, stating that the team were more interested with settling the lead characters in a "Conan meets Pamela Anderson" vibe. In regards to his environmental artworks, Rushbrook stated that his works "quite literally plastered a single room" during visits to the offices of Interactive Studios.

== Release ==
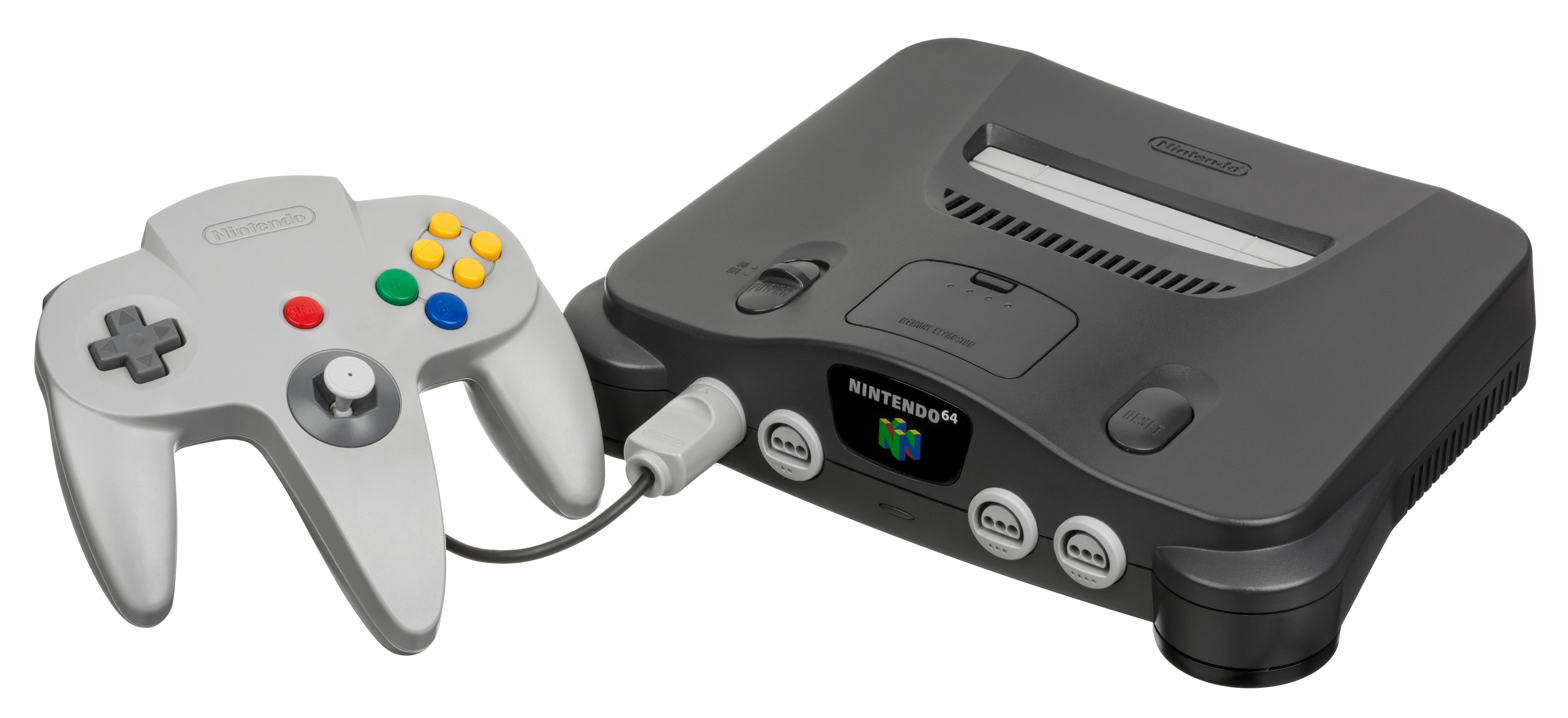
Dragon Sword for Nintendo 64 was completed for launch but was left unpublished due to MGM Interactive doubting whether it would be profitable.

Dragon Sword was announced by MGM Interactive between late 1997 and early 1998 alongside a Nintendo 64 version of Return Fire II under its original Dragon Storm name. In November 1998, an MGM Interactive stated that the game was still planned for launch on Nintendo 64, PC and PlayStation but would be exclusive for the Nintendo 64 during the first six months of release. The game made an appearance at E3 1999, where both the publisher and a release date were officially revealed. The title was planned for a late December 1999 release with previews touting support for two-players, before being delayed to an early 2000 launch but featuring support for four players instead of two.

Dragon Sword kept being previewed in magazines and was reviewed in the April 2000 issue of 64 Magazine but MGM Interactive decided not publish the final game due to doubts of not selling enough copies to turn a profit. As a result, one member of the development test left Interactive Studios for this decision and 64 Magazine began a petition to convince MGM Interactive to release the game, however the campaign ultimately proved unsuccessful. The title was intended to be the last release by MGM Interactive before being dissolved and was last previewed in the August 2001 issue of Computer and Video Games prior to cancellation due to lack of publisher, despite being completed and ready for launch.

When asked about a potential release on digital download services, Interactive Studios co-founder Philip Oliver declined the possibility, stating that "Dragon Sword was a great game at the time, but it was a third person battling game. There would be no point bringing that back as it would just look aged." On April 9, 2010, an unfinished playable beta build was leaked online by an anonymous collector. The beta build features 7 of the 10 planned levels but gameplay is prone to bugs due to its incomplete nature. In January 2019, publisher Piko Interactive acquired the rights and source code to Dragon Sword, with plans to finish its development.

== Reception ==
Reception

Review score
| Publication | Score |
|---|---|
| 64 Magazine | 93% |

Dragon Sword garnered positive reception prior to its cancellation. A writer for the British Nintendo Official Magazine stated in a July 1999 preview that "There's nothing quite like Dragon Sword on the Nintendo, and fighting fans will love it." Georges Grouard of French magazine GamePlay 64 noted visual similarities with The Legend of Zelda. A writer for Computer and Video Games stated in an August 2001 preview that "Dragon Sword looks like being the most exciting home-grown Nintendo title of the year."
