= Mysterious Song =

2000 video game

- Developers: Darkness Ethereal; Frozen Utopia (TG-CD)
- Publishers: Darkness Ethereal; Frozen Utopia (TG-CD)
- Designer: Matt Zuchowski
- Platforms: MS-DOS, TurboGrafx-CD
- Release: MS-DOS: NA: March 9, 2000; TurboGrafx-CD: NA: August 27, 2012
- Genre: Role-playing
- Mode: Single-player

Mysterious Song is a 2000 freeware role-playing video game originally developed and distributed by Darkness Ethereal for MS-DOS. Taking place in the land of Toren, the player assume the role of Spear, a young trainee knight who is tasked by King Algameth IX to investigate the insurgence of monsters that are appearing in the kingdom.

Designed by Matt "DarkDread" Zuchowski using QuickBASIC with additional help of other Darkness Ethereal members, Mysterious Song was developed over the course of three months between 1999 and 2000. The game was first released for DOS and was later distributed across websites such as CNET's Download.com and ZDNet, before being remade for the TurboGrafx-CD by homebrew developer Frozen Utopia. The title garnered positive reception from reviewers, who compared it with Dragon Warrior and Final Fantasy; praise was given to the battle system, presentation and music but other felt mixed in regards to the gameplay and some criticized certain aspects. An updated "DX" version was in development by Darkness Ethereal but never released, while a TurboGrafx-CD sequel is in development by Eponasoft.

== Gameplay ==

Top: Spear exploring a field map.
Bottom: A battle taking place
(MS-DOS)

Mysterious Song is a role-playing game reminiscent of Dragon Warrior and Final Fantasy, where the player assume the role of Spear, who is tasked by King Algameth IX of the Toren kingdom to investigate the sudden insurgence of monsters in the land. The game has two modes; In "Original" mode, the number of experience points required to level up is higher, while "Balanced" mode lowers the number of experience required to level up characters. Before starting the game, the player is presented with a menu which allows them to begin a new quest (a game), continue a previous quest. In the original DOS version, the player had the option to change the scrolling speed, while three different languages settings are available to choose before the title in the TurboGrafx-CD remake.

The player controls the protagonist and his companions in the game's two-dimensional fictional world that consists of various locations ranging from towns to dungeons, which are depicted as scaled-down maps where the player can converse with locals to obtain items and services, solve puzzles and challenges. Enemies ambush the party with random encounters on the field map or dungeons and initiates a battle that occurs directly on a separate battle screen.

Combat is menu-based: the player selects an action from a list of options such as Attack, Magic, Item and Run. The player and enemies can use physical or magical attacks to wound their respective targets during battle encounters, and the player can use items to heal or attempt to flee from battle. Each character and enemy has a number of hit points (HP), which can be reduced with successful attacks that decreases their hit points but it can be restored on the next turn. If the party flees, they will be returned to the map screen but the game is over if every character in the party dies and all unsaved progress will be lost.

== Synopsis ==
Mysterious Song takes place in the kingdom of Toren. The land enjoyed a period of peace and prosperity but the recent appearance of monsters prompted King Algameth IX in sending the young trainee knight Spear to investigate their source of emergence in Toren and seek aid of the knight Tiger in Illus, who is faithful to the crown and follows the orders of Algameth IX. Along the way, Spear and Tiger met the Illus magician Rynna, who joins the party on their investigation.

=== Characters ===
- Spear – A young knight summoned by King Algameth IX to investigate the emergence of monsters in the land of Toren.
- Tiger – A knight of Toren, who is faithful to the King Algameth IX and assists Spear in his mission.
- Ryanna – An elite Illus magician who joins Spear and Tiger in the investigation of the emerging monsters.
- Grimm – A voice who desires to learn the true motives of Spear.

== Development ==
Mysterious Song was developed by Darkness Ethereal, a game development group originally formed in 1996 as Dark Dreams Software by Matt "DarkDread" Zuchowski. Zuchowski and other independent outlets stated that he and Darkness Ethereal worked on the project for three months between 1999 and 2000 using QuickBASIC with help from other members, in addition of acting as composer of the soundtrack.

The TurboGrafx-CD remake of Mysterious Song began development in 2005 by homebrew developer Frozen Utopia over the course of several years, with David Lee "Nödtveidt" Perry and "Tom" serving as co-programmers, and was first slated for a March 2010 release but its launch kept being postponed due to various issues until its development was completed in 2012. Illustrator "RMC" created the artwork and Justin "Black Tiger" Cheer was responsible for the cinematics and battle graphics. "Kaminari" and "Armen", as well as three additional members wrote the French and Spanish translations respectively. Paul Weller, a member of Aehterbythe Studios, aided in its development as an artist drawing backgrounds for cutscenes.

== Release ==
Mysterious Song was first released by Darkness Ethereal for MS-DOS as freeware at their official website on March 9, 2000. The game was later distributed on websites such as CNET's Download.com, ZDNet and RPGDX, in addition of being included as part of the CD-appendix MB 2002: Huvi-ja Hyötyromppu bundled with a 2002 issue of Finnish computer magazine MikroBitti.

On August 27, 2012, the TurboGrafx-CD remake of Mysterious Song was published by Frozen Utopia as a limited run of 500 copies. The remake features redrawn visuals, voice-acted cutscenes, CD music and an "EX" game mode with a new storyline and gameplay elements. In 2015, a second run of the TurboGrafx-CD remake limited to 500 copies was also published by Frozen Utopia. Prior to launch, the TurboGrafx-CD remake was showcased at a convention by Aetherbyte Studios member Andrew Darovich, where it was well received by attendees. Conversions for the Atari Jaguar, Ouya and Xbox 360 were planned by Eponasoft but ultimately abandoned. Between 2014 and 2015, Piko Interactive announced on their official page that Super Nintendo Entertainment System and Sega Genesis ports were in development.

== Reception ==
Reception

Review scores
Publication	Score
GBGames	(DOS) 74.75%
QB Cult Magazine	(DOS) 90%
QB Gamer	(DOS) 4/5
V Planet!	(DOS) 23/35
Wasted Oldies	(DOS) 4/5

Award
Publication	Award
V Planet! (2001)	Best Original Graphics, Best Music, Best Sound, Best RPG, Game of the Year.

Mysterious Song was met with positive reception since its release on MS-DOS. According to online magazine QB On Acid, the game was downloaded 500 times per day on CNET. Maximiliano Baldo of Argentinian website Malditos Nerds ranked the TurboGrafx-CD remake as number ten on their top ten of games released for discontinued consoles.

Matthew R. Knight of QB Cult Magazine praised the battle system, visuals presentation, difficulty curve and sound. Terry Cavanagh of QB Gamer also praised the graphics, music, replay value, difficulty and plot but stated that the Dragon Warrior-like gameplay was its weakest aspect. Gianfranco Berardi of GBGames noted similarities with Final Fantasy and Dragon Warrior but gave positive remarks to the visual presentation and music but criticized several aspects.

"Jybbe" of Wasted Oldies also drew comparison with both Final Fantasy and Dragon Warrior, but praised the easy-to-learn gameplay and soundtrack but criticized the plot for being linear. Home of the Underdogs regarded it as one of the "better freeware "indie" RPGs ever made." Vance Velez of V Planet! commended the graphics, sound design, gameplay, plot, replay value, challenge and fun factor. V Planet! also gave several awards to Mysterious Song in 2001 and 2002.

== Legacy ==
In a 2001 interview, Matt "DarkDread" Zuchowski stated that he was working on an updated version titled Mysterious Song DX but it was never released. In 2013, Eponasoft announced a sequel for TurboGrafx-CD titled Mysterious Song II: Eternal Silence but development remained on hold due to Lee Perry working on another project at the time called FX-Unit Yuki: The Henshin Engine.
