= Tinhead =

1993 video game

- Original North American Sega Genesis cover art
- Developer: MicroProse
- Publisher: NA: Ballistic; Piko Interactive (Super NES)
- Producer: Stuart Whyte
- Designer: Richard Lemarchand
- Programmers: Chris Newcombe; Jim Gardner; Nick Thompson
- Artists: Allan Holloway; John Reitze; Mark Wilson
- Writer: Robert Giedt
- Composer: Paul Tonge
- Platforms: Sega Genesis, Super Nintendo Entertainment System
- Release: NA: 1993
- Genre: Platform
- Mode: Single-player

Tinhead is a 1993 platform video game developed by MicroProse and published by Ballistic for the Sega Genesis. Piko Interactive acquired the rights to the game and released a canceled Super Nintendo Entertainment System version in 2015.

== Plot ==
Gameplay screenshot.

An evil intergalactic goblin named Grim Squidge steals all the stars from the sky with a vacuum cleaner-nosed spaceship, seals them in glass spheres and scatters them far and wide across distant planets, threatening the very infrastructure of spacetime.

On a space station far out in the distant reaches of galactic space, Tinhead, the metallic Guardian of the Edge of the Universe, picks up a distress signal from an unknown friend of the stars. Arming his head-mounted ball bearing gun, he rushes to the stars' rescue.

== Release ==
Ports for both the Amiga and Super Nintendo Entertainment System were in development and scheduled for 1994 but were cancelled. Former MicroProse UK employee Steve Goss stated in a 2001 forum post at AtariAge that a conversion of the game was also in development and completed for the Atari Jaguar but was never released due to low sales of the system.

== Reception ==
Electronic Gaming Monthly gave the game a score of 6.4 out of 10, commenting that the game is on the hard side but gets by due to useful power-ups and "dynamic" bosses. They cited the graphics as the highlight of the game.
