= Bleem! =

PlayStation emulator

- Developer: Bleem! Company
- Release: March 1999; 27 years ago
- Final release: 1.6b / August 16, 2001; 25 years ago
- Operating system: Windows, Dreamcast
- Type: Video game console emulator
- License: Proprietary
- Website: www.bleem.com at the Wayback Machine (archived May 15, 2001)

Bleem! (styled as bleem!) is a commercial PlayStation emulator released by the Bleem! Company in 1999 for Windows and Dreamcast. It is one of the few commercial software emulators to be aggressively marketed during the emulated console's lifetime, and was the center of multiple lawsuits.

== History ==
Bleem! was a PlayStation emulator designed to allow people to play original PlayStation games on Windows 95 or 98 or on the Dreamcast (the Dreamcast version was called Bleemcast!). It was released in March 1999. The company that developed and commercialized Bleem! initially consisted of just two people, David Herpolsheimer (president) and Randy Linden, but in the commercial phase included Will Kempe, Scott Karol, Sean Kauppinen, Bryan Stokes, James Sinclair, and Paul Chen, later of Rovio Entertainment.

=== Context ===
To allow for full-speed emulation on lower-end computers of what was at the time a current generation console, the authors coded Bleem! in assembly. This allowed them to create precise optimizations. Unlike Connectix's commercial Virtual Game Station, it made use of a PC's 3D graphics hardware for rendering, allowing for enhanced resolutions and filtered textures not possible in real-time software rendering of the time.

Bleem! used low-level memory emulation and other real-mode technology. It did not function on operating systems using the Windows NT kernel, including Windows 2000. Bleem!'s statement at the time was that Bleem! would never support running on Windows NT-based systems, as Windows 98 was the dominant operating system at the time.

Sony, despite having lost its case with Connectix, continued to pursue legal action against Bleem!. Bleem!, financially unable to defend itself, was forced to go out of business.

As of 2005, two members of the team were working for Sony: Randy Linden was working for SCEA on porting titles and looking at the possibility of emulation of previous generation titles for the next PlayStation, and Sean Kauppinen was promoting EverQuest II and Star Wars Galaxies for Sony Online Entertainment.

=== Copy protection ===
To combat redistribution of the small downloadable emulator, the user had to buy the Bleem!-CD, containing about 35 MB of data: a DirectX distributable and the actual version of Bleem! available at the time of the CD's printing. The rest of the CD was only for copy protection and was impossible to copy by conventional means; nevertheless, the copy protection was cracked within two weeks of the release.

Further updates to the emulator were free until the company ceased operation several years later.

== Bleemcast! ==
Comparison: R4: Ridge Racer Type 4, running natively on the PlayStation, and under Bleemcast!, respectively.

Bleemcast! is an independently developed commercial emulator by Bleem! that allows one to load and play PlayStation discs on the Dreamcast. It is compatible with most Dreamcast controllers and steering wheels, and leverages the Dreamcast's superior processing power for enhanced graphics. It was created by using the MIL-CD security hole found in the Dreamcast BIOS.

=== History ===
In a 2026 interview with Zophar of Zophar's Domain, Randy Linden claimed that Sega secretly assisted in the development of Bleemcast! by loaning them a Dreamcast development kit. Although Sega declined to grant a license to publish Bleemcast! on a GD-ROM due to possible legal issues with Sony and as a form of plausible deniability for Sega, they tacitly instructed Linden to reverse-engineer the MIL-CD format — whose technical details were only available to a select few developers owing to piracy concerns — by purchasing the MIL-CD single "Heartbreak Diary" by the J-pop girl group deeps.

Originally, Bleem! was planning to have the disc able to run any PlayStation game on the Dreamcast, but due to technical difficulties, they developed the concept of the "Bleempak", in which the software would boot only 100 specific games each. New Bleempaks would have to be purchased if one game was not available to boot in a Bleempak. Due to the Dreamcast controller's fewer buttons compared to the PlayStation, there were plans to release a Bleem! controller somewhat similarly designed to the PlayStation controller, and a PlayStation-to-Dreamcast controller adapter, which would allow one to use a PlayStation controller on the Dreamcast. As technical difficulties grew further, all these ideas were scrapped, with no "Bleempak" and no hardware releases.

However, they managed to release individual Bleemcast! bootdiscs for three popular games: Gran Turismo 2, Tekken 3, and Metal Gear Solid. WWF SmackDown! was also being planned for a release, but was not completed, while a couple of screenshots of Final Fantasy IX were surfacing during this time, but was never announced as a planned release. As promised from the beginning, the games ran in a 640×480 resolution, as opposed to the PS1's 320×240 resolution, and featured anti-aliasing and bilinear filtering. This drastically improved the games' graphics, but also brought out some graphical imperfections that were originally hidden in the lower resolution.

== Reception ==
Reception

Aggregate score
Aggregator	Score
GameRankings	57%

Review scores
Publication	Score
AllGame	3.5/5
Computer Games Strategy Plus	2/5
EP Daily	6.5/10
IGN	5.5/10

The Bleem! emulator was released to mixed reviews, according to GameRankings. AllGame summarized the product as one suited for PlayStation owners who "have the patience", citing compatibility issues with some of the games, including those that would not run at all, but noting continued support for the software, as well as superior graphics and performance compared to the PlayStation, depending on the computer's hardware. In its assessment of versions 1.2 and 1.3 beta, IGN concurred, also praising the software's setup, but finding that almost every PlayStation title it had tested on Bleem! had some major flaw hindering the gaming experience.

PC Accelerator lauded the features and options with which to utilize the capabilities of a computer with a 3D accelerator card, but criticized the setup for being too complicated to the average user and lacking the means to automatically configure settings based on a system's hardware and software. The magazine also reported its tests of several popular PlayStation titles lacking a Windows port, which found a general improvement in picture quality, but some games suffering from sound issues and the graphics tending to be washed out when hardware-rendered. Electric Playground welcomed the emulator's ability to recognize cheat codes and import memory card files, but was deterred by the demanding hardware requirements and need to adjust system settings. Nonetheless, it praised Bleem Company's support and resolve to improve its software, recommending others to wait for the improvements.

Reviewing version 1.3 beta, Computer Games Strategy Plus was unimpressed by the emulator's speed mismatches with its console counterpart, choppy or omitted sound output, and gameplay pauses, despite praising the concept of a cheaper, 3D-accelerated alternative to a PlayStation console, ultimately failing to recommend the product over the console. FiringSquad was similarly disappointed by version 1.4's sound glitches even with the sound quality set to best and the lack of ability to tune the emulator's speed limiter option, also criticizing the inability to customize settings for each individual game and the lack of auto-configuration based on whether a title is Direct3D-supported according to the website's database. It went on to describe the product as "way out of its league" in the commercial space, calling it "a work in progress" that is "implemented horribly" despite earlier praising the novelty of an emulator enabling 3D acceleration and high resolutions.

=== Sony lawsuit ===
Two days after Bleem! started taking preorders for their emulator, Sony filed suit over violations of copyright. Sony had accused Bleem! of engaging in unfair competition by allowing PlayStation BIOSs to be used on a personal computer as this would ultimately damage Sony's sales of the PlayStation. The Judge had rejected the notion, and issued a protective order to "protect David from Goliath". Sony's second copyright allegation regarded the use of screenshots on their advertisements comparing the native PlayStation and emulated Bleem! versions. The district court had held in favor of Sony regarding the allegation and issued a preliminary injunction against Bleem!; however, Bleem! later appealed the decision providing their use of copyrighted material was protected under fair use. The appeal was successful, with the court stating that the use of screenshots of Sony's video games rather constituted comparative advertising.

In spite of the loss, the release of the Bleemcast! caused Sony to file another lawsuit accusing them of unfair competition and patent infringement regarding the use of PlayStation BIOSs on the Dreamcast. This approach had become problematic for Bleem!, despite no actual court ruling against them. The main issue regarded the financial problems Bleem! had faced as they had to deal with defense costs of $1 million per patent. This had caused Bleem!'s work to decline, so that they had only managed to release three games: Metal Gear Solid, Gran Turismo 2, and Tekken 3, for the Bleemcast!. At this point, Sony had obstructed Bleem! from developing further video games for the Bleemcast! and had even threatened retailers selling these products.

The legal fees forced the company out of business and eBay auctions of some of the company's possessions were held soon after – including a huge library of worldwide game releases used for compatibility testing.

==== Closure of Bleem! ====
Although Sony ultimately did not win any of its lawsuits against them, Bleem! had to shut down when the huge court costs became too much for the small company to handle. Bleem! shut down in November 2001, the same year Sega announced that they would discontinue the Dreamcast in North America. Bleem! closed their website, with only an image on their front page showing Sonic the Hedgehog tearfully holding a flower next to a Bleem! gravestone. However, the image was later altered and Sonic was removed, ironically to avoid a lawsuit from Sega. Sega themselves had also been indirectly involved in the obstruction of Bleemcast! by the way of the removal of support for the unpopular (for Sega's intended use) MIL-CD format on later Dreamcast models.

==== Beta leak ====
A beta build of Bleemcast! was eventually leaked. Even though it was buggy and incomplete, it would run some PlayStation games, though not all the games it ran would be playable. Using this beta, hackers were able to create "Bleemed games" – discs of a PlayStation title with the Bleemcast! emulator built in. ISO images of many of these discs were known to circulate on file-sharing networks.

After the leak, Rod Maher, one of the developers of Bleemcast!, made a public statement regarding the beta, providing some insight into the development process. He revealed that the leaked beta predated the beta that had been shown at E3 and that the leaked beta was 30% complete. The commercial Bleemcast! release was notable as the only release on the Dreamcast that had not been pirated, as it had a complex copy-protection scheme. All three Bleempaks were finally cracked and made available online in December 2009, eight years after their introduction.

== Legacy ==
The case of Bleem! software has been analyzed by legal scholars in the context of the industry's treatment of third-party emulation of video games. The lawsuits shed light on the scope of fair use in United States copyright law and the extent to which video game companies rely on anti-circumvention provisions of the Digital Millennium Copyright Act (17 U.S. Code § 1201(a) and (b)), as Sony had, to drive out competing products, regardless of whether copyright had actually been infringed.

=== Bleem Powered ===
On January 4, 2021, Piko Interactive announced that they had acquired the Bleem! brand name, with plans to start a retrogaming-focused online storefront titled Bleem Powered, which as of 2025 still seems to be under development. One of their current projects is a version of the game Glover for the PlayStation 4 and PlayStation 5.
