= Iron Commando =

1995 video game

- Developer: Arcade Zone
- Publishers: JP: Poppo; WW: Piko Interactive; JP: BlazePro; (SNES re-release)
- Composer: Carlo Perconti
- Platforms: Super NES, Windows, Evercade VS
- Release: Super NES: JP: February 10, 1995; Super NES (re-release): WW: January 30, 2017; JP: November 29, 2017; Windows: WW: July 13, 2016
- Genre: Beat 'em up
- Modes: Single-player, multiplayer

Iron Commando is a 1995 beat 'em up video game developed by French developer Arcade Zone for the Super Nintendo Entertainment System. The game was scheduled to be released in Europe by Sony Electronic Publishing (who also published Arcade Zone's previous title, Legend) sometime between 1994 and 1995, but was cancelled after Sony discontinued its third-party publishing business on the Super NES in order to focus on the PlayStation, leaving the title orphaned without a publisher. A Japanese localization was released by Pack-In-Video's Poppo subsidiary on February 10, 1995.

Piko Interactive ended up acquiring the international publishing rights to Iron Commando, initially releasing the game digitally on Steam in 2016, before eventually producing a reproduction cartridge for the Super NES in 2017. BlazePro also produced a reproduction cartridge for the Super Famicom version for the Japanese market during the same year.

== Gameplay ==
A soldier named Jack and a kung-fu master named Chang Li are the Iron Commando field team. They must cross ten different environments to save the world, fighting against punks, gunfighters, knights and any kind of strange creatures.

== Reception ==
Famitsu gave the SFC version a 20/40.
