= Super Hunchback =

1992 video game

- North American cover art
- Developer: Ocean Software
- Publishers: NA: Ocean Software; JP: Imagineer
- Composer: Matthew Cannon
- Platforms: Game Boy, PC
- Release: NA: April 1992; JP: June 26, 1992; EU: 1992
- Genre: Platform
- Mode: Single-player

Super Hunchback (スーパーハンチバック), known in France as Le Bossu: Super Hunchback Quasimodo, is platform video game released for the Game Boy in 1992 by Ocean Software in North America and Europe and Imagineer in Japan. It is a sequel to their 1984 conversion of the 1983 Century Electronics arcade game Hunchback. The title screen bears a 1991 copyright, the cartridge label records the year as 1992.

On June 2, 2021, the game was released on Windows PCs via Steam by Piko Interactive.

== Gameplay ==
Spikes instantly kill Quasimodo in this game, taking the place of the lava and deep water deaths found in most video games.

The game featured a series of nine levels, each divided into five sections. The player, as Quasimodo, could advance from one section to the next by locating and ringing a giant bell. Progress is hindered by obstacles such as cannonballs (which can be ridden but will catapult Quasimodo across the screen if he takes a side hit), arrows, bubbles, swinging ropes and rolling logs. Some sections feature water portions. There is an emphasis on hidden sections and on quick play - losing a life causes the player to be returned to a nearby location with no break in gameplay.

Fruit is littered throughout the levels and can be collected for points. At the end of each level, the player is told what percentage of fruit they found and awarded an extra life if they managed to collect 100%. Each section is played against the clock, represented as a burning fuse at the bottom of the screen. Collecting hourglasses gives extra time.

Bonus levels, entered by jumping into a spinning warp, give a chance to earn an extra life if the player is able to collect ten pieces of fruit and get to the exit within a very short time. Only when this is successfully done is the bonus level considered complete. Subsequent warps will repeatedly return Quasimodo to the same bonus level until it is completed.

If time ran out then a giant bell, presumably Emmanuel from Notre Dame de Paris, would fall from the sky capturing Quasimodo and causing him to lose a life.

Despite coverage by the popular Nintendo Power video game magazine, the game sold relatively few copies in North America and was not widely released. Conversely the game received several highly positive reviews in Europe and was briefly very popular.

== Reception ==
German video gaming magazine Power Play gave Super Hunchback a score of 70% in their June 1992 issue. In episode 2 of season 1, British television show Bad Influence! gave it 4 out of 5 stars.
