= Blender Bros. =

2002 video game

- Developer: Hudson Soft
- Publishers: Infogrames; Piko Interactive (Windows)
- Platforms: Game Boy Advance; Windows
- Release: Game Boy Advance; NA: April 16, 2002; Windows; August 25, 2020
- Genre: Platform
- Modes: Single-player, multiplayer

Blender Bros. is a 2002 platform game developed by Hudson Soft and published by Infogrames. The game was originally released for the Game Boy Advance, but in 2020, the game was ported to Windows by Piko Interactive.

== Gameplay ==
In Blender Bros., Players take control of Blender, a robotic dog. The player must navigate through a series of worlds (levels), defeating all enemies and solving all puzzles they encounter. Each world has a different theme (grassy, oceanic, etc.). A level is divided into three main stages, followed by a boss. One world is available initially. Completing a world unlocks one or more other worlds which the player will then have to complete until the final world. Levels consist of platform navigation, puzzle solving, boss fighting (at the end of the level), and a driving sequence.

The levels are nonlinear and focus on puzzle solving and dexterity rather than speed (though the levels are timed, and players can track their times for each level). One aspect of the levels is the ability to interact with the background. Most levels consist of two layers, a front and back area which players can periodically move between. When players are in the front area, enemies and switches (an aspect of the game's puzzle solving mechanic) can be seen in the back area, forewarning them about the next part of the level. If they have access to a cosmo ball (a red ball that Blender can throw to kill enemies or hit switches), they can throw it upward to hit objects in the back area, allowing them to eliminate enemies before having to encounter them.

The game consists of seven worlds: Oasis, Diva, Earth, Shelltarl, Cosmo Heaven, Fo9, and Millitar. Oasis is the only world unlocked at first. Players also have access to Cosmo Heaven, but only as a hub at first. After completing Oasis, they unlock Diva and Shelltarl. After completing those, Earth and Fo9 are unlocked. Completing these unlocks Millitar. Upon completing Millitar, Cosmo Heaven is invaded by the Zooligans, turning it into the final world of the game. Shelltarl is the only world which does not follow the three-stage format of the other worlds, being a single long level.

Throughout the game, players can collect Mini Bros. Mini Bros. are familiars that give them particular abilities. Nuckle, the Mini Bro. that players start out with, gives them extra range for their primary attack. Some Mini Bros. can also be evolved by playing the correct music for them. The records to play this music are available in the shop for ten bones each (bones being the currency of the game).

Blender performs most of his attacks using his ears, generally using the B button, depending on context. Pressing down in mid-air, or pressing the A button to jump from the crouch position, will cause Blender to flip upside-down and perform a high jump. Pressing B while doing a high jump will cause Blender to perform a "downward attack" resembling a drill. Blender can also charge his spin attack to perform a "spin wave". The spin wave is Blender's longest-range attack, not including the extra attack range given by equipping Nuckle.

Blender's ears are also used for navigation. While in the air, Blender can use his ears to hover for a brief time. He can also use them to climb ropes and jump to a higher platform (by hitting them on the ground).

Besides the main gameplay, Blender Bros. also allows up to 4 players to connect using the Game Link Cable to play mini-games (such as 4-player racing) and trade Mini Bros.

== Plot ==
In the future, humans and anthropomorphic animals, called Animalmen, coexist. The number of Animalmen eventually surpasses the number of humans, and a group of anti-human Animal-Men, the Zooligans, plan to destroy the humans and rule the galaxy. The protagonist, Blender, a dog-like animal and the leader of the Cosmo Keepers, is determined to save the galaxy from the evil Zooligans.

Blender is aided by the Mini Bros., a series of ball-like robots that exhibit various special support abilities, including illuminating dark areas and healing Blender.

== Reception ==
Reception

Aggregate score
Aggregator	Score
Metacritic	73/100

Review scores
Publication	Score
Game Informer	7.5/10
GamePro	3.5/5
GameSpot	7.4/10
GameZone	6.8/10
IGN	7.8/10
Nintendo Power	8.2/10

Blender Bros. received mixed to positive reviews, averaging a score of 73/100 on Metacritic based on 10 critics' reviews.

Tim Tracy of GameSpot gave this a 7.4 and wrote, "If you enjoy good 2D platform games, you can't go wrong with this one." Craig Harris from IGN described the game as "pretty typical for a platformer" and overall as a 'fun, easy challenge", praising the multiplayer functions, ultimately giving the game a 7.8.

A common criticism of the game was that it was too short and easy to beat. The game's translations from Japanese to English were also criticized.
