= Gourmet Warriors =

1995 video game

Gurume Sentai Barayarō
- Original Japanese Super Famicom cover art
- Developers: Fupac, Winds
- Publishers: Original release: JP: Virgin Interactive Entertainment; Relaunch: JP: BlazePro; WW: Piko Interactive
- Director: Satoshi Fujishima
- Producer: Takeshi Matsuo
- Designer: Tomoharu Saitō
- Programmer: Koji Otsuka
- Artists: Shirō Endō; Tomoyuki Yamazaki
- Composer: Ikko Ogawa
- Platform: Super Famicom
- Release: Original release: JP: 29 September 1995; Relaunch: JP: 30 January 2018; WW: 15 April 2019
- Genre: Beat 'em up
- Modes: Single-player, multiplayer

Gourmet Sentai Barayarō (Note: Japanese: 美食戦隊 薔薇野郎(ぐるめせんたい ばらやろう), Hepburn: Bishoku Sentai Barayarō; lit. "Rose Rascals: Gourmet Squadron", also known as Gourmet Squad and Gourmet Warriors worldwide.) is a surrealistic side-scrolling beat-'em-up developed by Winds and published by Virgin Interactive Entertainment for the Super Famicom in 1995 only in Japan.

On January 30, 2018, the game was re-released by BlazePro/ Piko Interactive. In addition, Piko Interactive created and published a US SNES cartridge in 2019, for the first time with a full official English translation, titled Gourmet Warriors.

== Gameplay ==
Gameplay screenshot.

Each of the five stages has a time limit; players lose all the ingredients that were acquired when the timer reaches zero. However, the game has no concept of how many lives the player can have; it is an automatic game over if the player dies. Focusing on the time limit is important if the player wants to recuperate lost strength after the fight with the level's boss. One of the game's notable features is that a button is used to make the character perform various sentai poses when held down and used with the directional pad; while it is not beneficial, this was added to make the character flex their muscles for show.

== Plot ==
In the year 20XX, the metropolis known as Zeus Heaven Magic City has made a miraculous recovery from the fires of a nuclear World War III. In order to survive in this city of power and technology, inhabitants must ingest protein in whatever food they can find. The secret organization Bath is a force that grows and expands every day, causing enough violence and strife within the city to bring it to near ruin. Zeus's leaders, however, have launched a secret project that gives them a fighting chance in defending the city against Bath. This project looks to enhance and create a soldier wearing the special body armor, the strongest of the strongest body armor. From this project the conception of the idea to modify the human body was conceived, and three humans: Bonjour, Mademoiselle, and Très Bien have been transformed into fighting machines.

== Reception ==
Retro Gamer gave it an overall score of 79%, advising one "should at least emulate it or watch the couple of game-play videos someone posted on YouTube. If you can stomach Choaniki – or even enjoy it – then this should be right up your alley." GamesRadar played the game on YouTube in the Freaky RadarPlays series and Le Monde featured it in Retro & Magic.
