= Legend (1994 video game) =

- North American SNES cover art
- Developer: Arcade Zone
- Publishers: Super NES: NA: Seika Corporation; EU: Sony Electronic Publishing; WW: Piko Interactive (Re-release); Windows: WW: Piko Interactive
- Designers: Carlo Perconti; Lyes Belaidouni
- Artist: Lyes Belaidouni
- Composer: Carlo Perconti
- Platforms: Super NES, Windows
- Release: Super NES; Original release: NA: April 1994; EU: 21 December 1994; Re-release: WW: 30 January 2017; Windows: WW: 11 November 2015
- Genres: Beat 'em up, hack and slash
- Modes: Single-player, multiplayer

Legend is a side-scrolling hack and slash beat 'em up video game developed by Arcade Zone and originally published in North America by Seika Corporation in April 1994 and later in Europe by Sony Electronic Publishing on December 21 of the same year for the Super Nintendo Entertainment System. It is the first game to be solely developed by the duo of Carlo Perconti and Lyes Belaidouni at Arcade Zone, who both would later go on to found Toka and HyperDevbox Japan respectively.

Taking place in the fictional kingdom of Sellech during the Middle Ages, players take control of the knight warriors Kaor and Igor in an attempt to defeat the corrupt son of the king of Sellech, Clovis, before he manages to harness power from the imprisoned soul of maleficent despot Beldor and conquers the land as a result. Inspired by several high fantasy medieval-themed beat 'em up arcade games from Capcom and Sega, Legend was conceived as an idea by Perconti and Belaidouni to create their own action-oriented project.

Legend garnered mixed reception from critics since its initial release on the Super NES. While the graphics received praise, the gameplay was deemed by most as repetitive and lacking depth. Although Legend never received a direct sequel, Toka created a remake of the game for the PlayStation which was also called Legend. In 2015, the original game was ported to Microsoft Windows by independent developer and publisher Piko Interactive. A spiritual successor, Konan, was also in development and planned for the Atari Jaguar by both Perconti and Belaidouni but was never finished or released.

== Gameplay ==
Gameplay screenshot.

Legend is an arcade-style side-scrolling hack and slash beat 'em up game similar to Golden Axe and The King of Dragons where players take control of Kaor and Igor through seven stages in total of varying thematic set in the kingdom of Sellech and battling against an assortment of enemies along the journey, with the main objective being defeating the corrupt son of the land's king, Clovis, before he manages to break free the sealed remnant of Beldor's powers and conquers Sellech. The characters have several fighting abilities in their disposal to counterattack such as their swords, kicks and magic spells. Players can also block incoming enemy attacks by using their shields. There are also special techniques that can be performed by pressing a combination of buttons such as a jump slash, among others at the cost of health. Defeating certain enemies also drops items that can be picked up such as food, magic bags and extra lives. After completing a level, players would be sent to a bonus round where items can be collected for points or picked up for later use in the game. Although there are seven stages, one of them can only be accessed if the players are captured by the enemies and imprisoned in a dungeon during a boss fight. In the options menu, players can customize the color of their clothing in the American version and the speed of the game (between normal and turbo) in the European version as well as the ability to change the default difficulty setting or share lives between each other during co-op play.

== Synopsis ==
The story of the game is that the maleficent despot Beldor reigned over the kingdom of Sellech for 1000 years, bringing chaos and destruction to the land. Many knights went on a crusade to overthrow Beldor but none of them ever returned. United, people built energized heroes, managing to seal the soul of Beldor and peace was brought to the land afterwards. Clovis, the corrupt son of the king of Sellech, now seeks to harness the power of Beldor and conquer the kingdom by doing so. As such, players assume the role of knight warriors Kaor and Igor in order to defeat Clovis. After travelling across the land, meeting townsfolks who aid them in their quest, while battling against enemies and creatures, both Kaor and Igor reach the sanctuary where Clovis resides and after finally defeating him, Beldor's soul is vanished from the land and their glorious victory is widespread all over the world.

== Development and release ==
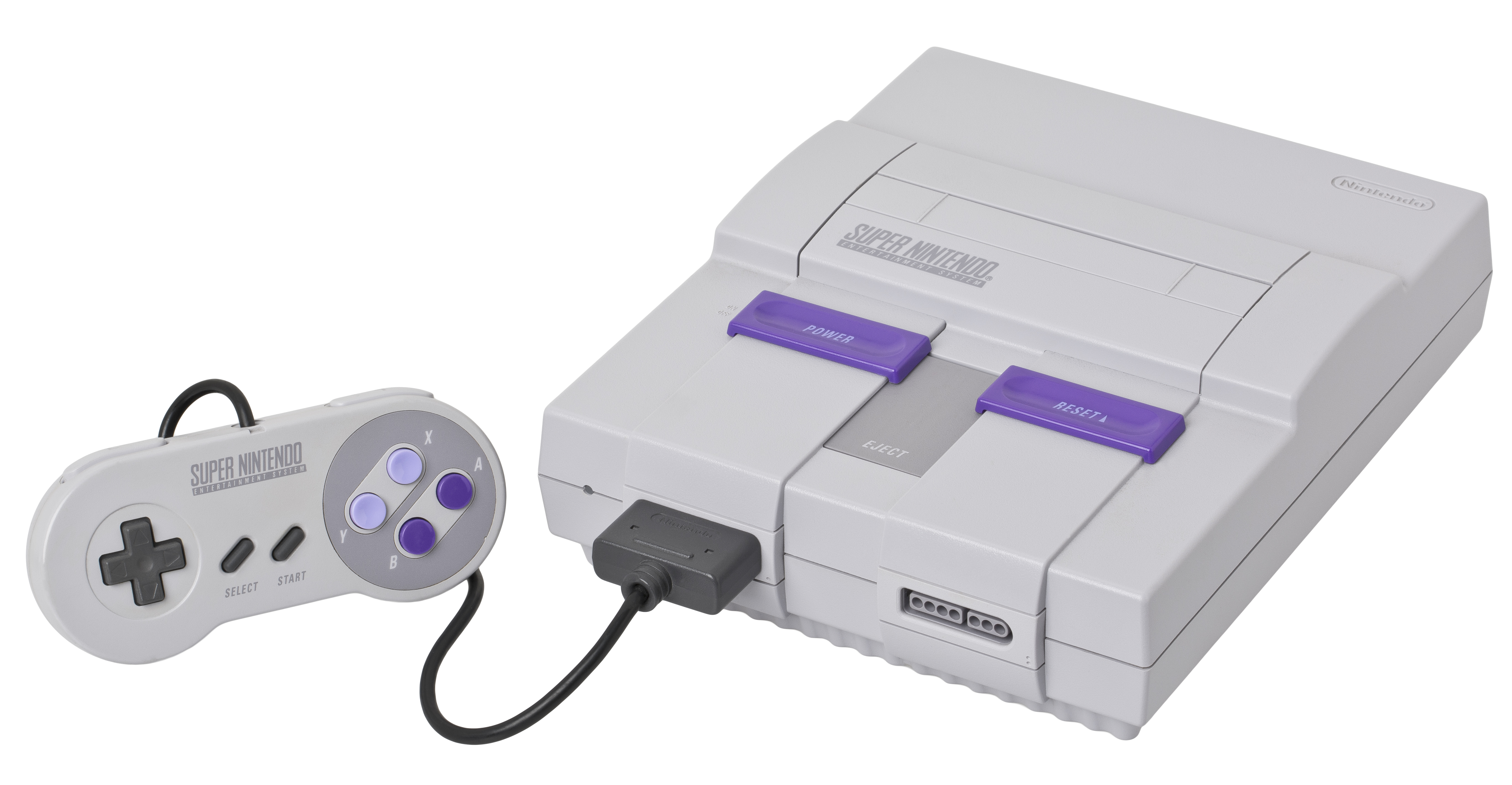
Legend for the SNES was created under tight conditions in a short development time.

Carlo Perconti worked for several companies such as Loriciels and Titus Interactive as a freelance graphic designer, while Lyes Belaidouni worked under the same area in the latter, who were mainly developing racing games for Amstrad home computers and the Nintendo Entertainment System. Belaidouni preferred action-oriented titles but due to the then-current direction of productions under Titus, who also were not interested in developing for the Super NES outside of publishing with the exception of Prehistorik Man, he resigned along with Perconti and marketing manager Gabriel Guary to establish their own game development company called Arcade Zone to create titles for home consoles. Their first idea was to create a game under the beat 'em up genre, which was not widely developed in North American and Europe in the 1990s, and were inspired by several arcade games from Capcom and Sega such as Knights of the Round, Golden Axe and The King of Dragons, with Perconti later stating that "we made the game we wanted to play."

The two co-founders were the sole authors of Legend which was developed as a passion project under turbulent conditions on a quick pace between two and three months, becoming the company's first project, with Perconti serving as its programmer. The game was created from scratch as the team had no financial backing, no access to a software library, nor an official Nintendo development kit for the Super NES, while Guary was in charge of the business side of the company. Belaidouni made all the artwork for backgrounds and characters in Deluxe Paint on Amiga before being transferred to PC for Perconti, who handled hardware coordination and other tasks. After finishing development, the game was first showcased at Consumer Electronics Show, where Capcom was also exhibiting the Super NES conversion of The King of Dragons.

Legend was first released in North America in April 1994 by Seika Corporation and later in Europe by Sony Electronic Publishing on December 24 of the same year. Perconti has said that the lack of a Japanese release of the game was due to the company not having contact and competition of the market in the region. He also stated that the game sold well, though it is unknown how many were sold in total during its original lifetime. In 2015, Piko Interactive ported the title to Microsoft Windows and it was published through Steam. Two years later, the original Super NES version was re-released worldwide by Piko Interactive.

== Reception ==
Reception

Review scores
Publication	Score
Consoles +	90%
Game Informer	7.25/10
HobbyConsolas	63/100
Hyper	59/100
Jeuxvideo.com	16/20
Joypad	79%
M! Games	66%
Mega Fun	75%
Player One	80%
Super Play	55%
Total!	(UK) 76% (DE) 4-
Video Games (DE)	79%
Nintendo Magazine System	60/100
Play Time	75/100
Super Power	85/100
VideoGames	5/10

Legend garnered an average reception from critics. GamePro's Captain Squideo praised the game's graphics, but found its sound effects mediocre and the gameplay monotonous, explaining that fights are one-dimensional and there is little variety between enemies, leading players performing the same tactics over and over again. Electronic Gaming Monthly's Mike Weigand commended the boss design and long levels, but remarked that the game, while good overall, lacked variety, which he considers a crucial factor in beat 'em ups. In 2013, Kotaku Australia identified it as one of the best looking beat 'em up games from the 16-bit era.

== Legacy ==
After the initial release of Legend in North America, Arcade Zone would go on to develop two more titles for the Super NES: Iron Commando and Nightmare Busters, with the former being originally only published in Japan by Poppo in February 1995 before being picked up for a worldwide re-release as well as being ported to Windows by Piko Interactive, and the later being cancelled due to financial issues before its development was resumed by the original authors and eventually published worldwide by Super Fighter Team in December 2013. A spiritual successor, Konan, was also in development and planned for the Atari Jaguar by both Perconti and Belaidouni but was never finished and released. Due to no longer being able to find interested publishers as a result of Sony discontinuing distribution of Nintendo-related products and incapable of publishing their own titles, Arcade Zone was shut down and stopped any current project under development. However, both Perconti and Belaidouni founded Toka shortly afterwards, and would later develop a remake of the game for the PlayStation bearing the same title.

=== Konan ===
Gameplay screenshot from the unreleased Konan for the Atari Jaguar.

During an exhibition at the CES, both Carlo Perconti and Lyes Belaidouni met key people representing Atari Corporation and, intrigued by the architecture of the Atari Jaguar, became involved with developing for the platform. The two began creating a new engine on PC before receiving a Jaguar development kit. Afterwards, they started porting a level of what the team wanted to showcase their engine based upon the fictional character Conan the Barbarian, although a license had yet to be signed and were inspired by several arcade games. Regarded by Belaidouni as "the most beautiful beat 'em up with huge sprites and monumental backgrounds", the project was first announced and previewed in December 1994 by French magazine CD Consoles under the tentative title Conan, featuring an early graphical art style while its overall style and gameplay were very similar to that of Legend.

The game was only displayed for co-op play once at Atari Corp.'s booth during the Winter Consumer Electronics Show in 1995, featuring two playable characters that were named after both developers and used the same sound effects from the aforementioned Super NES title, with Electronic Gaming Monthly referring to the title as Conan the Barbarian. It was also showcased in a promotional recording sent by Atari to video game retail stores in the same year, now under the title Konan and scheduled for an August/Q4 1995 release date. However, due to financial constrains as a result of Sony's decision to not keep supporting Nintendo products in Europe and lack of funds, the project never moved forward from being a tech demo to a full-fledged title.

Perconti has since stated in recent years that the source code of Konan has become lost and the only remaining proofs of its existence are various screenshots taken by several video game magazines and gameplay footage, while no prototypes containing a ROM image of the demo have been found to date.

=== PlayStation remake ===
The PlayStation remake was released in 1998. Unlike most 3D beat 'em ups, the player advances from left-to-right on a 3D but linear path.
