= Hexplore =

1998 video game

- Developer: Heliovisions Productions
- Publishers: PAL: Infogrames Multimedia (Note: Released under the Ocean brand name.); NA: I•Motion
- Director: Marc Albinet
- Producer: Pascal Stradella
- Designer: Marc Albinet
- Programmer: Denis Dufour
- Artists: François Delnord; Frederic Bascou
- Composer: Olivier Gaudino
- Platform: Windows
- Release: PAL: 1998; NA: September 1998
- Genres: Role-playing, action, adventure, puzzle
- Modes: Single-player, multiplayer

Hexplore is a 1998 role-playing video game developed by Heliovisions Productions and published by Infogrames Multimedia. It was released digitally on December 20, 2019 by Piko Interactive on GOG.com.

== Premise ==
Screenshot from Hexplore.

Set in 1000 AD, the player explores the world as MacBride, the adventurer. Early in the game you are joined by three party members, an archer (Drulak), a warrior (Vigrad) and a sorcerer (Uraeus). The player must track down Garkham, the black magician, to free the main characters' companions that were taken prisoner.

The game continues the story from there, and characters may leave or join the party (of a maximum of four members) in subsequent missions. Most of the characters are optional, which means the user may or may not recruit them for future quests.

The game features over 200 levels with puzzle-solving and combat, and allows up to 4 players in cooperative multiplayer mode.

== Technical details ==
The game's engine utilises voxels for creating 3-D shapes and the level, being then relatively fast at the time it was released. The game world is seen from a top-down, isometric perspective, and the player is allowed to rotate the camera round the centre of view.

== Reception ==
Reception

Aggregate score
Aggregator	Score
GameRankings	66%

Review scores
Publication	Score
AllGame	3/5
CNET Gamecenter	4/10
Computer Games Strategy Plus	2.5/5
Computer Gaming World	2.5/5
Game Informer	6.5/10
GamePro	4/5
GameSpot	6.9/10
Next Generation	3/5
PC Gamer (US)	47%
PC Zone	74%

The game received average reviews according to the Review aggregation website GameRankings. Next Generation said, "Hexplore is no Diablo, but it offers an excellent introduction to the genre. Newcomers can move up to the heavy-hitters later, once they learn the ropes."
