= 8 Eyes =

1988 video game

- North American cover art
- Developer: Thinking Rabbit
- Publishers: JP: SETA; NA: Taxan
- Director: Tōru Ishikawa
- Producer: Hiroyuki Imabayashi
- Designer: Hideki Shimura
- Programmer: Hiroto Nakamura
- Composer: Kenzou Kumei
- Platform: Nintendo Entertainment System
- Release: JP: September 27, 1988; NA: January 1990
- Genre: Platform
- Modes: Single-player, multiplayer

8 Eyes (Note: Japanese: エイト・アイズ, Hepburn: Eito Aizu) is a 1988 platform video game developed by Thinking Rabbit and published by SETA for the Nintendo Entertainment System. The game features eight levels, and can be played by one or two players. It also features a large, diverse soundtrack, composed by Kenzou Kumei, consisting of three pieces for each of the eight levels, which are set in different parts of the world.

Piko Interactive acquired the rights to 8 Eyes and released it for Microsoft Windows via Steam on August 14, 2019. 8 Eyes was also released on the Evercade as part of Piko Interactive Collection 1 on May 22, 2020.

== Gameplay ==
8 Eyes is a sidescroller with 2D gameplay.

The game consists of eight levels, each set in the castle of one of the dukes. At the completion of each level, Orin receives a new sword. The player can choose to play each of the first seven castles in any order, though the boss at the end of each is vulnerable to only one sword. It is therefore easier to play levels in a particular order. There are hints about the correct order hidden throughout the game. Only after each has been completed can the House of Ruth be played.

After the House of Ruth has been cleared and the 8 Eyes recovered, the player must return the jewels to the Altar of Peace. At this point the jewels must be placed in a particular order, or the game is lost. Hints about the order of the jewels are also hidden throughout the game.

8 Eyes features a cooperative mode in which one player controls Orin and the other player controls Cutrus. In the single-player mode, the player has limited control of both characters simultaneously; this significantly increases the difficulty of the game. The gameplay and graphical style are noticeably similar to Castlevania.

== Plot ==
=== English version ===
8 Eyes is set in a post-apocalyptic future. Mankind is recovering from hundreds of years of chaos and nuclear war, and civilization is being rebuilt by the Great King, who harnesses the power of eight jewels. The jewels, known as the 8 Eyes, were formed at the centers of eight nuclear explosions that came close to destroying Earth. The 8 Eyes have mysterious power which, in the wrong hands, could bring about the end of the world. The Great King's eight power-hungry dukes steal the jewels for themselves and banish the King to the nuclear wastelands, threatening to once again plunge the Earth into war.

The player controls Orin the Falconer and his fighting falcon Cutrus. His mission is to infiltrate the Dukes' eight castles and retrieve the 8 Eyes. With the help of Cutrus, Orin must fight the Dukes' soldiers, nuclear mutants, and the duke of each castle to retrieve the jewels. After the jewels have been recovered, Orin must return them to the Altar of Peace so that the Great King may return and finish rebuilding the Earth.

=== Japanese version ===
The Japanese version of the game is set in the Balkans in the late 19th century. A research team was sent by the British Museum to investigate some newly discovered ruins. However, the entire team was brutally slaughtered, with their heads missing and their stomachs cut open. All of the artifacts they uncovered and their excavation journals were stolen.

The perpetrator of the murders was a group led by Ruth Grandier, a female bandit known for her demonic worship who claimed that she and her group were fallen children of Lucifer. The College of Arms learned that Ruth's group stole artifacts which concealed demonic secrets and could be used in a dark ritual to resurrect demons.

To stop Ruth, the College of Arms Seventh Division (which would eventually become the MI5) decided to send Baronet Sir Julian James Bond, the greatest swordsman in all of England. Sir Bond infiltrated the Balkans along with his pet eagle, Cutlass.

== Reception ==
8 Eyes received mediocre reviews upon its release. Power Play gave the game a 60/100. Electronic Gaming Monthly scored 8 Eyes 23/40.
