= Tyrannosaurus Tex =

- Cover art of the game by Eidos
- Developer: Slitherine Software
- Publishers: Eidos Interactive (Cancelled), Piko Interactive
- Engine: SLIT3D
- Platform: Game Boy Color
- Release: May 2018
- Genre: First-person shooter
- Mode: Single player

Tyrannosaurus Tex is a cancelled first-person shooter video game for the Nintendo Game Boy Color portable console developed by Slitherine Software and planned to be released in March 2000. The game generated high expectations, as it would have been one of only two first-person shooters released for the Game Boy Color, alongside Ultimate Paintball.

In January 2013, a 30 minutes gameplay footage video was released to the Internet, after the prototype cartridge was sold at auction.

On March 8, 2016, Piko Interactive announced that they had acquired the rights to this game, and it was later released officially in May 2018. They are also planning to port this game to PC and "other" platforms.
