= Attack of the Mutant Penguins =

1995 video game

- Developer: Sunrise Games (Note: Audio engine by Attention to Detail. Music by Cogent Productions.)
- Publishers: Atari Corporation; GameTek (DOS)
- Producers: Alistair Bodin; Darryl Still
- Designers: Dan Cartwright; Paul Hoggart; Wayne Smithson
- Programmers: Mark Robinson; Paul Hoggart; Wayne Smithson
- Artists: Andrew Hanson; Dan Cartwright
- Platforms: Atari Jaguar, MS-DOS
- Release: Jaguar: EU: December 1995; NA: March 15, 1996; DOS: NA/EU: 1996
- Genres: Action, strategy
- Mode: Single-player

Attack of the Mutant Penguins is an action-strategy video game developed by Sunrise Games and published by Atari Corporation for the Atari Jaguar in Europe in December 1995, and North America on March 15, 1996. A port titled Mutant Penguins was released in 1996 by GameTek for MS-DOS. The plot follows Bernard and Rodney, intergalactic heroes defending earth against alien invaders disguised as penguins. The player must dispatch the alien penguins before they reach a doomsday weapon, in the form of a weighing scale. Earth also has real penguins, who help the player by fighting the aliens and counteracting their weight on the scale.

Attack of the Mutant Penguins was one of the first projects supported by Atari's European development center, established to work with European independent developers on new Jaguar games. Atari selected the project after soliciting presentations from multiple game developers. Sunrise Games founder Wayne Smithson worked with Atari producers Alistair Bodin and Darryl Still, focusing on unique gameplay rather than maximizing the console's hardware. Gaming publications gave both the Jaguar and DOS versions mixed reviews. Some reviewers found the game's concept fresh and innovative, but others felt there was a lack of direction due to the changing gameplay elements, while criticism was geared towards its learning curve.

== Gameplay and premise ==
Attack of the Mutant Penguins is an action-strategy game with puzzle elements played from a top-down perspective, described as a cross between Lemmings (1991) and a platform game. The premise of the game is that Earth is invaded by aliens, who disguise themselves as penguins after monitoring nature television shows. Believing that penguins were Earth's dominant species, the invading aliens quickly realize their mistake and try to fix their disguises to appear more human. As part of their domination plan, the aliens brought to Earth a weighing scale-like doomsday weapon called the Doomscale. The penguins of Earth were unhappy once they found out about the plan, deciding to fight against the aliens with aid from Bernard and Rodney, two intergalactic freelance heroes sent out to stop the invasion.

Bernard killing a mutant penguin with a pan, as an alien penguin becomes another mutant (Atari Jaguar version shown)

Controlling either Bernard or Rodney, the main objective of the game is to kill alien penguins before they reach and trigger the Doomscale. In some levels, the alien penguins will try to reach a transformation station and turn into their mutant form, weighing three times more than their alien form on the Doomscale. The helpful penguins of Earth also appear on the playfield to reach and counteract the aliens' weight on the Doomscale. They can fight against alien penguins in real-time, however they can also be accidentally killed by traps or caught into the player's attack range. If the alien penguins outweigh the helpful penguins on the Doomscale, it will trigger the weapon and the game is over.

The player is initially locked into a preview state where they can observe the locations of items and switches within the level. The player can pick up a "Gremlin" creature in the playfield and drop them on a treasure chest to open it, revealing letters that unlock the player-character's weapon once you spell the right word (a bat for Rodney and a pan for Bernard). They can also be dropped into traps placed around the playfield to distract or kill alien penguins. The chests are opened and traps are built more quickly depending on the number of Gremlins, but they will scatter once their task is done and the player has to pick them up again. Traps and chests can also spawn bonus items for the player.

Once the character's weapon is obtained, it can be energized via power orbs dropped when any penguin is stunned. Grabbing five power orbs energizes the weapon for more damage, while each player-character has different special attacks that are unlocked by grabbing ten orbs or a samurai power-up. After the level is completed, one of three bonus rounds is randomly selected. Depending on the player's performance, they are rewarded with a number of helpful penguins on the Doomscale at the start of the next level. There are 20 stages (30 stages in the DOS version) in total. There is also a game mode called "Pandemonium", where the player must endure against endlessly spawning alien penguins until the Doomscale is triggered.

== Development ==
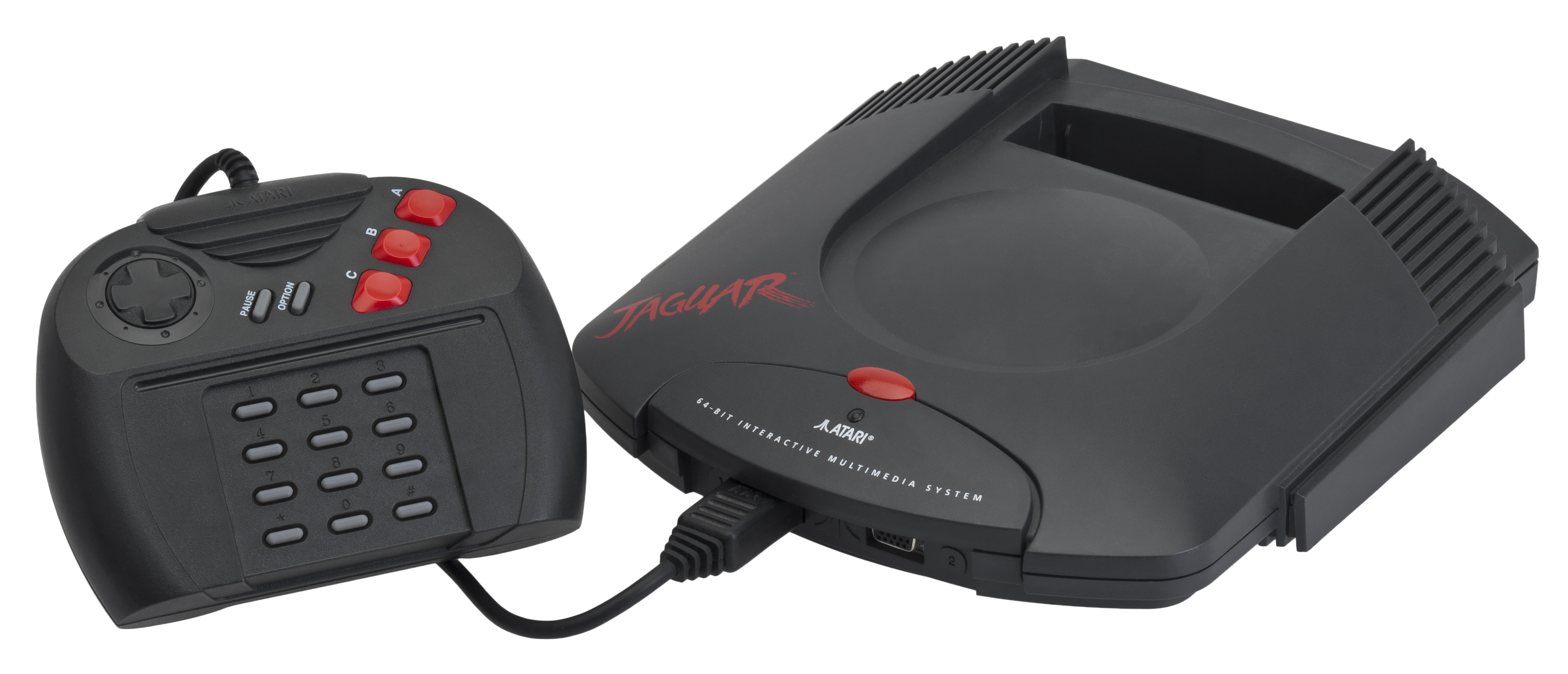
Attack of the Mutant Penguins was part of an effort by Atari to work with independent developers and create games for the Jaguar.

Attack of the Mutant Penguins was created by Sunrise Games (previously WJS Design), a Leeds-based game developer founded by Wayne Smithson in 1982 under the name Smithson Computing. It was one of the first projects from Atari Corporation's European development center, a software division established with the aim of working with independent developers around Europe to create games for the Atari Jaguar. Atari had asked various studios to propose new game concepts, and they selected Mutant Penguins after a presentation from Sunrise Games.

It was co-produced by Alistair Bodin and Darryl Still, both of whom led the European development center within Atari outside their working hours. Smithson expanded the Sunrise Games' staff as Mutant Penguins became their main focus, with former Superior Software staffer Mark Robinson joining the company after appliying via a job ad in a computer magazine. Smithson acted as co-level designer alongside Dan Cartwright and Paul Hoggart. Smithson and Hoggart also acted as co-programmers along with Robinson. Cartwright served as lead artist while Andrew Hanson was responsible for the background graphics with assistance from junior artist Dan Hunter and Robert Brearly. It was one of Hunter's first works in the video game industry, before becoming involved as graphic artist in titles such as BioShock 2 and Dark Sector. A composer for Mutant Penguins is not credited, though Attention to Detail and Cogent Productions are respectively listed for providing the audio engine, as well as creating its music and sound effects.

The team sought to create an original and playable experience instead of showcasing the Jaguar's hardware. Smithson found the Jaguar's hardware similar to the Atari ST but trickier due to its architecture, requiring various tricks to draw sprites and interleaving instructions to achieve an optimal performance. Robinson also found the Jaguar's hardware challenging to work with, due to all its processors sharing and accessing the memory simultaneously. Hunter drew the sprites for the Gremlins using Deluxe Paint III on an Amiga 500. Robinson revised the low level graphics code until issues were resolved, including an issue where audio slowed down when too many objects were on screen. Internal documentation from Atari showed that development of Attack of the Mutant Penguins was completed by December 11, 1995. Producer Daryl Still remembers it as one of his favorite projects, describing the concept as ahead of its time, though speculating that it may have been more popular with newer audiences.

== Release ==
Attack of the Mutant Penguins was first announced in August 1995 and originally scheduled for an October release date. The game was later delayed to November but was showcased to attendees at the 1995 ECTS Autumn event, where it was well received by those in attendance at the show. It was covered by the press that were invited to the European division of Atari Corporation, and showcased during an event hosted by Atari dubbed "Fun 'n' Games Day". The game was first published in Europe in December 1995, and later in North America on March 15, 1996, becoming one of the last releases for the Jaguar before Atari merged with JTS Corporation.

A PC port was first set to be published by Atari Interactive before the division closed down in 1996, but it was eventually published by GameTek for MS-DOS as Mutant Penguins. The DOS version was also published in Japan by Fujicom on August 15, 1997. Sunrise Games would later work on Grand Theft Auto 2 for Microsoft Windows and PlayStation, and changed their name to RGB Tree in 2000. They were later acquired by Rage Software, who rebranded the studio as Rage Leeds before consolidating their operations in 2001. In 2021, the DOS version was re-released via Steam by Piko Interactive.

== Reception ==
Reception

Review scores
Publication	Score	
Publication	Atari Jaguar	DOS
CNET Gamecenter	N/A	8/10
Computer and Video Games	58/100	N/A
Game Informer	5.75/10	N/A
Game Players	88%	N/A
M! Games	79%	N/A
PC Games (DE)	N/A	70%
PC Zone	N/A	26%
ST Format	90%	N/A
Video Games (DE)	60%	N/A
Atari Computing	89%	N/A
Atari Gaming Headquarters	8/10	N/A
Games World	90/100	N/A
PC Joker	N/A	66%
PC Player	N/A	2/5
Power Play	N/A	55%
ST Magazine	76%	N/A
Ultimate Future Games	29%	N/A
VideoGames	6/10	N/A
World Village (Gamer's Zone)	N/A	2/5

Attack of the Mutant Penguins on the Atari Jaguar garnered mixed reviews from critics. ST Format's Iain Laskey highlighted the game's sprites and puzzles, but felt that it needed more levels and better music. Game Players's Patrick Baggatta felt that the soundtrack was uninspired, but praised the accessible gameplay, stylish visuals, and blend of action and puzzle elements. VideoGames magazine stated that the game can be rather engaging, while Atari Gaming Headquarters' Patrick Holstine regarded it as a quality game for the Jaguar. Author Andy Slaven labelled it as "a solid (if short) bit of entertainment", and HobbyConsolas identified it as one of the twenty best games for the platform.

MAN!AC's Oliver Ehrle praised the game's graphics and animations, but found some of the levels confusing and criticized sections that lacked music or caused stuttering. Marc Abramson and Tristan Collet of the French ST Magazine commended its originality but felt that it was "a bit boring". GameFan's Miss Demeanor criticized the game's controls, but added that "there is so much fun and action in AMP that you won't care." French magazine CD Consoles thought the game's concept was fresh and innovative, but remarked that it graphically looked like a 16-bit title. Computer and Video Games's Tom Guise noted the game's difficulty, and felt that the player's actions were too limited due to the predetermined placement of traps.

Games World's Dave Perry and Paul Morgan noted that the game was visually similar to ToeJam & Earl. While Perry and Morgan praised its humor, storyline, playability, "puzzling" levels, and bonus rounds, both saw the audio as a drawback for not providing a sense of atmosphere. GamePro said the visuals were okay, but found the sound boring and the controls frustrating. They also remarked that the game lacked playability. Video Games' Jan Schweinitz felt there was a lack of direction due to the changing gameplay elements. Schweinitz also opined that the game could be effortlessly done on a 16-bit console. British publication Ultimate Future Games noted the game's influence from Lemmings (1991), ToeJam & Earl, and Sink or Swim, but panned it for being "frustratingly sluggish".

=== DOS ===
Mutant Penguins on MS-DOS carried similar reception as the original Jaguar release. PC Games' Herbert Aichinger gave favorable comments for the game's VGA graphics, varied soundtrack, controls, and progressive challenge. PC Joker's Richard Löwenstein commended the game's audio, idea, and level design, but stated that the overall presentation was "old-fashioned". Power Play's Michael Galuschka thought the visuals were passable and the music was fitting, but noted the "jerky" scrolling in later levels.

PC Player's Monika Stoschek gave positive remarks for the game's audiovisual elements but noted its "occasional instability", opining that the title did not offered innovations in its genre. Edmond Meinfelder of World Village (Gamer's Zone) found the gameplay complex but tedious. PC Zone's Mark Hill found the game confusing, writing "Mutant penguins or not, you wouldn't want your kids' minds warped by this."
