= Glover (video game) =

1998 video game

- North American box art for the Nintendo 64 version
- Developer: Interactive Studios (Note: Piko Interactive developed both the 2022 Windows re-release and the console re-releases.)
- Publisher: Hasbro Interactive (Note: Piko Interactive published the 2022 Windows re-release, and QUByte Interactive published the console re-releases.)
- Director: Darren Wood
- Producer: Chris Down
- Designer: Richard Albon
- Programmers: Darren Wood; Steve Bond; Matt Cloy
- Artists: Joff Scarcliffe; Richard Albon
- Composers: Rob Lord; Paul Weir; Mark Bandola
- Platforms: Nintendo 64; Windows; PlayStation; Nintendo Switch; PlayStation 4; PlayStation 5; Xbox One; Xbox Series X/S; Evercade
- Release: Nintendo 64, Windows: NA: November 16, 1998; EU: November 24, 1998; PlayStation: NA: November 30, 1999; EU: October 4, 1999; Evercade: EU: April 14, 2024; NS, PS4, PS5, XBO, XSXS: WW: February 27, 2025
- Genre: Puzzle-platformer
- Mode: Single-player

Glover is a 1998 puzzle-platformer developed by Interactive Studios and published by Hasbro Interactive for the Nintendo 64 and Windows in 1998, and for the PlayStation in 1999 (branded under Hasbro Interactive's Atari Interactive label). The game follows a magical, four-fingered glove named Glover in his quest to restore the Crystal Kingdom by retrieving crystals that were lost.

The Nintendo 64 and Windows versions received generally positive reviews while the PlayStation version garnered negative reviews. A sequel titled Glover 2 was planned, but eventually cancelled. A second updated Windows port was released in 2022 and a port for Nintendo Switch, PlayStation 4, PlayStation 5, Xbox One, and Xbox Series X/S was released on February 27, 2025.

== Gameplay ==
The player uses Glover's "slap" maneuver on the rubber ball in the Nintendo 64 version.

Players control a glove named Glover. The main objective is to maneuver the ball toward the goal in each stage. Once all three stages and the boss stage are cleared, a crystal ball can be restored back to the castle. There are six worlds, each containing three stages, a boss stage, and a bonus stage accessed by collecting all the Garib cards in a given world. When Glover is in contact with the ball, he can roll, bounce, throw, slap, dribble, walk on top of the ball, and use it as a trampoline. Without the ball, Glover can do both regular and double jumps, cartwheel, fist slam, locate the ball and garibs, and grab the ball. While walking on the ball, the controls are reversed. On easy difficulty, walking on the ball is automatic while moving the ball across water. However, bonus stages are unavailable.

The ball can also be magically transformed into one of four forms: rubber ball, ballbearing, bowling ball, and the ball's original crystal form. With a cheat code, the ball can be transformed into a power (high-bounce or super) ball. The rubber form gives the greatest amount of abilities for the ball. It can easily be bounced, slapped, thrown, and even float on water. The bowling ball form allows the ball to not break easily, sink in deep water, and kill enemies by slapping it. The ballbearing form gives precise control over the ball, can be used to throw and slap the ball more carefully and is also magnetic. The crystal form floats on water and is fragile, but gives double points for each obtained Garib. The power ball can bounce higher and be slapped and thrown farther than other forms. Throughout the stages, there are magic potions that help Glover by giving him power-ups for a certain amount of time.

If the ball gets destroyed or Glover loses all three hearts, Glover loses one life and must start from the beginning of the stage or from the last checkpoint.

== Plot ==
The story takes place in a fictional land known as the Crystal Kingdom, where a wizard rules from his Crystal Castle, which is surrounded by six portals leading into other worlds, including the lost city of Atlantis, a circus park, a pirate's domain, a horror-themed fortress, a prehistoric era, and outer space. The life force of the kingdom is maintained by seven magical crystals that rest atop the spires of Crystal Castle. The wizard is accompanied by the magical, sentient gloves Glover and Glovel, who assist him in creating strange potions and spells.

One day, the wizard accidentally mixes the wrong batch of potions in his cauldron, causing a large explosion that turns the wizard into a statue, sends him falling down the tower, and sends his gloves flying. The left glove, Glovel, lands in the cauldron while the right glove, Glover, flies out the window and lands onto the ground outside the castle. The explosion also shakes the crystals from the spires, causing the land to become dark and foreboding. Before they could shatter upon impact, Glover quickly casts magic to turn the crystals into rubber balls. One of the balls remains in the kingdom while the other six bounce into each of the portals. Glover realizes that to bring the wizard back to life and restore the kingdom's beauty, he must enter these worlds, find the crystals within them and bring them back to the castle. However, Glovel was corrupted by the cauldron's chemicals and becomes "Cross-Stitch", a malevolent trickster who is determined to destroy Glover and rule the Crystal Kingdom for himself.

Glover traverses from realm to realm and must protect the rubber balls at all costs while bring them back home. As he does, Cross-Stitch attempts to thwart him by setting traps and creating monsters, but Glover is able to overcome these obstacles with his magical skills and retrieve the crystals. He is also aided by a living hat named Mr. Tip, who offers hints during Glover's quest. The Crystal Kingdom is gradually restored to its former state with each crystal returned to the castle. In the final realm, Glover fights Cross-Stitch in a giant robot fight and emerges victorious, sending Cross-Stitch flying.

After the last crystal is brought back, they all return to the castle spires where they belong. Thus, the wizard is finally returned to flesh and the kingdom is restored. As he and Glover take in the sights, Cross-Stitch lands right in front of them. Glover then jumps back onto his master's hand and beckons Cross-Stitch to do so as well. Cross-Stitch attempts to run away, but the wizard casts a spell that turns him back into Glovel. He then puts Glovel back on and all three of them celebrate with a double thumbs up.

=== PlayStation ===
The PlayStation version of the game tells the events of the game through an animated FMV instead of a real-time cutscene. This version slightly alters how the game's events began, likely to tie it into the planned sequel. In this opening, both Glover and Glovel are already revealed to be alive and have their sentience, and the Wizard can use magic without them.

The opening begins with Glovel deliberately giving out the wrong potion to the Wizard, to which the Wizard pours it into his cauldron after he puts the gloves on. However, the potion turns green and suddenly spews out its contents – surprising the wizard as he is sent spinning and causes Glover to fly out the window and Glovel to jump into the cauldron. The wizard soon turns into a gold statue and explodes, falling down the Crystal Castle's main tower. When Glover notices the crystals have come loose from their spires, he turns them into bouncy balls which fly into the different worlds. Back inside the Crystal Castle, the Wizard's cauldron explodes – revealing Cross-Stitch inside.

In the ending, after Glover saves the Wizard, they use their magic to return the crystals back to the Castle spires and bring peace back to the Crystal Kingdom. Glover then soon notices Cross-Stitch crash-landing on a meteor. The Wizard soon uses a spell to return Cross-Stitch back to Glovel. He then lands on the Wizard's hat with Glover next to him, and the three all return to the castle.

== Development ==
Glover was developed by Interactive Studios and published by Hasbro Interactive. The game was originally announced at E3 1998; in August 1998, it was reported that the game was 60% completed. Two months later (in October), the game was reported to be 70% completed. During late in development, it was reported that Glover would have required the character to cross water.

According to designer Rich Albon, the collectible Garib cards in the game got their name from an in-office joke: "The studio was doing a port for a Japanese company at around the time of Glover and they got a faxed bug report (yes, a faxed bug report!) which had one item that read, 'There is a problem with the Garib.' No one knew what a Garib was – there was no reference to it in the in game or in the code. So it kind of became an office meme: anything without a name became a Garib."

At some point in development, Nintendo showed interest in publishing the title, with Shigeru Miyamoto even suggesting that it could be rebranded as a Mario spinoff titled "Mario's Glove". This ultimately wouldn't come to fruition as talks fell apart with Hasbro Interactive.

On September 15, 1998, it was announced that Nintendo would handle distribution of the Nintendo 64 version in Europe.

== Reception ==
Reception

Aggregate score
Aggregator	Score	
Aggregator	N64	PS
GameRankings	70%	31%

Review scores
Publication	Score	
Publication	N64	PS
AllGame	N/A	3.5/5
Edge	7/10	N/A
GameSpot	5.1/10	4.8/10
IGN	8.3/10	2.6/10
N64 Magazine	83%	N/A
Next Generation	3/5	N/A
Nintendo Power	7.4/10	N/A
PC Zone	67%	56%
Video Games (DE)	78%	N/A

For the Nintendo 64 version, Glover received generally positive reviews by critics. Matt Casamassina of IGN praised the Nintendo 64 version, specifically on its gameplay and sound. They wrote that the music matched the levels "perfectly". John Broady of GameSpot recommended the game for patient players in search of a challenge. Paul Hales of PC Zone gave it a 67%, stating: "It's all good, clean, harmless fun in reasonably 3D rendered landscapes." Edge magazine gave the game a seven out of ten, stating that it was not all that original, but also stated that the game provides regular surprises that make it an entertaining game.

Next Generation reviewed the Nintendo 64 version of the game, rating it three stars out of five, and stated that "with interesting level designs, a challenging structure for item collection, and bright, competent visuals, Glover does manage to provide a refreshing angle on typical platformers."

Despite positive reviews for the Nintendo 64 version, the PlayStation version was heavily panned by critics. Matt Whine of IGN gave the PlayStation version a "Terrible" 2.6. They wrote that the game "looks bad" in comparison with both the Nintendo 64 version and other PlayStation games. Miguel Lopez of GameSpot also criticized this version, stating that "Glover, despite its interesting play mechanics, seems to have lost its soul in the port from the N64." PC Zone gave the game 56%, stating: "There's no denying Glover is bizarre, but at the same its not particularly interesting. The standard trudge through obligatory ice world, water world and space world, flicking switches as you go, hardly constitutes as enthralling gameplay."

== Legacy ==
=== Cancelled sequel ===
An online advertisement for Glover 2, the canceled sequel from 1999. The poster is a reference to the Jaws film poster.

In July 1999, Interactive Studios announced a sequel titled Glover 2 was being developed after the first one was released. The game was set to continue where the story of the first game left off and would have a more complete story that would unravel as the game progressed. Gameplay features of Glover 2 would have been similar to the original game with enhancements for hand/ball physics, enhanced graphics, and a new multiplayer mode. The game was expected to release in mid-1999 for the Nintendo 64, then PlayStation and Dreamcast the following year, but was cancelled along with Frogger 2's Nintendo 64 port. In October 2011, it was reported that Nesworld.com acquired a prototype cartridge of the game and had released a ROM hack of it. On February 25, 2015, James Steele, a former Interactive Studios programmer, released a blog entry detailing the reasoning of the cancellation of the game. An employee at Hasbro doubled the amount of produced cartridges, leaving the company with roughly half-a-million dollars' worth of stock that could not be sold and forcing Glover 2 to be cancelled. The game was around 80–85% completed before development ceased.

In 2018, indie studio Golden Mushroom claimed that it would be working on a sequel to Glover for Nintendo Switch. The studio had applied for the trademark for Glover, but had not obtained the copyright, leading the studio to mistakenly believe that they also had ownership rights to the character and content of the original Glover game. Those rights were owned by Piko Interactive, who had purchased the copyright to Glover from Atari SA, which had purchased Hasbro Interactive in 2001.

=== Re-releases ===
In 2017, Piko Interactive, a game company focused on re-releasing old video games, physically acquired several properties from Atari SA including Glover. The company stated their intent to produce a re-release of Glover for newer platforms such as Steam, as well as finish and release the Nintendo 64 version of Glover 2. On March 7, 2022, Piko announced a remaster of Glover for modern computers built using the game's original source code. It was released via GOG and Steam on April 20, 2022, and will eventually be released on the upcoming Bleem! Store. On October 26, 2022, during the QUByte Connect 2022 presentation, a port of Glover for Nintendo Switch, PlayStation 4, PlayStation 5, Xbox One, and Xbox Series X/S, was announced to be in development by QUByte Interactive, in collaboration with Limited Run Games. The re-release launched on February 27, 2025. Metacritic listed the PS5 version as the eighth worst video game of 2025.

A slightly modified version of Glover (64-bit) was ported to the Evercade platform in 2024.
