= Thinking Rabbit =

Japanese video game company

- Type: Public
- Industry: Video games
- Founded: 1982; 44 years ago
- Headquarters: Japan
- Key people: Hiroyuki Imabayashi (president)
- Products: Video games
- Website: thinkingrabbit.jp

Thinking Rabbit (有限会社シンキングラビット, Yūgen gaisha Shinkingurabitto) was a video game developer and publisher based in Takarazuka, Japan, founded by Hiroyuki Imabayashi, with sources differing on the founding date: 1982 and spring 1983. The company is known for mystery adventure games such as Keyhole Murder and for being the original publisher of Sokoban.

Falcon, a Japanese software company, currently owns the trademark and copyright to Thinking Rabbit's work.

== Games ==
Year	Title	Platform
1982	Sokoban	NEC PC-8801
1983	Keyhole Murder	NEC PC-8801, Fujitsu FM-7
1984	T.N.T. Bomb Bomb	NEC PC-8801, NEC PC-8001mkII, Fujitsu FM-7
1984	Sokoban 2	NEC PC-8801, Fujitsu FM-7, Fujitsu FM-8
1987	Jikai Shounen Met Mag	Famicom Disk System
1988	The Man I Love	NEC PC-8801, MSX2, Sharp X68000
1988	Casablanca: Ni Ai Wo Satsujinsha Ha Jikuu Wo Koete	MSX2, Sharp X68000
1988	8 Eyes	Nintendo Entertainment System
1990	Hydlide 3 Special Version	Sharp X68000
1991	Mega Man II	Game Boy
1992	Superman	Sega Genesis
1995	Maten Densetsu: Senritsu no Ooparts	Super Famicom
unknown	Madeleine	NEC PC-8801
1985	A Clown Murder Case	NEC PC-8801, Sharp X68000
unreleased	UWC	Nintendo Entertainment System
