= Sean Kauppinen =

American video game executive

- Born: South Amboy, New Jersey
- Occupation: Video game executive
- Known for: Video Game Industry Visionary

Sean Kauppinen is an American video game executive, with particular experience as a marketer, publicist and speaker on the industry worldwide. He has worked for, a number of companies including bleem!, Sony Online Entertainment, Ubisoft, and 3dfx Interactive, among others. Kauppinen is the founder and CEO of the International Digital Entertainment Agency (IDEA). Kauppinen was the marketing and public relations person for bleem!, a company that helped define the Digital Millennium Copyright Act.

In 2007 he was named to the GDC advisory board

In June 2008, he was quoted by Gamasutra as predicting a glut of downloadable games video game consoles by independent developers and self-publishers. In December 2008, Kauppinen was named Interim CEO of Frogster America, Inc., a subsidiary of Frogster Interactive Pictures, a German publicly listed company.

Kauppinen has performed marketing and PR to launch more than 570 video games over the last 20 years, including EverQuest 2, Lord of the Rings Online, Star Wars Galaxies, Warhammer Online, Age of Conan and The Sims 2.

In 2009 he was named to the GDC Europe Advisory Board along with Bob Bates, Don Daglow, Bob Wallace, Tom Putzki, Harald Riegler and Frank Sliwka, as well as the South by Southwest (SXSW) Advisory Board. In June 2009, he called for Apple to implement quality control on the iPhone platform.
