= Metal Mech =

1990 video game

Metal Mech: Man & Machine
- Japanese cover art
- Developer: Sculptured Software
- Publisher: Jaleco
- Designer: Joe Hitchens
- Programmer: Ken Grant
- Composer: Paul Webb
- Platform: Nintendo Entertainment System
- Release: JP: December 14, 1990; NA: March 1991
- Genre: Action
- Mode: Single-player

Metal Mech: Man & Machine is a 1990 action video game developed by Sculptured Software and published by Jaleco for the Nintendo Entertainment System.

In May 2023, the game was included via the Piko Interactive Collection 3 compilation for the Evercade by Blaze Entertainment.

== Gameplay ==
Playing on the first level of Metal Mech.

The player controls the driver of a vehicle that is similar to the ED-209 of the RoboCop franchise.

The player must clear levels filled with randomly generated enemies in an unnamed city in order to survive. Items that can upgrade the firepower and defense of the vehicle are hidden in crates. Players must spend as much time outside of the armored unit as they do inside because the mecha fighter is a bigger (but tougher) target. They must also leave the mecha to climb ladders that lead to necessary items and to advance the game's storyline. The game was noted to have a few similarities to Blaster Master. The "little person" has a virtually identical appearance to Jason in the Blaster Master video game. Controlling the person is easier than controlling the mech. Players have to collect radiation symbols around the city.

== Reception ==
Reception

Review score
| Publication | Score |
|---|---|
| Hippon Super! | 4/10 (FC) |

Metal Mech was released in Japan for the Family Computer on December 14, 1990.

Ichiro Tezuka of Hippon Super! described the game as monotonous.
