= UWC (video game) =

- Developer(s): Thinking Rabbit
- Publisher(s): SETA
- Platform(s): Nintendo Entertainment System
- Release: Unreleased
- Genre(s): Wrestling

UWC is an unreleased wrestling video game developed by Thinking Rabbit in 1988 or 1989 for the Nintendo Entertainment System (NES). The game was set to be published by SETA but was never officially announced or released. In June 2019, the game's ROM image was made available to download for free.

== History ==
The game became known in March 2019 when YouTuber Stephan Reese, known online as Archon1981, got his hands on the game after a former Nintendo employee gave it to him. Reese uploaded footage of him playing UWC on YouTube after the Video Game History Foundation (VGHF) digitized the game. The game was first beaten by the VGHF and footage of the play through was also uploaded to YouTube.

=== Release ===
Another video game collector offered $10,000 to purchase the game and for Reese not to release it, but Reese declined, stating he was planning on releasing the game online "soon". On June 9, Reese posted a video to his YouTube channel in which he announced that the ROM had been uploaded and was available to download for free.

== Connection to World Championship Wrestling ==
While the game does not use the World Championship Wrestling name, it does appear to have been based on that promotion. The name Universal Wrestling Corporation, which formed the initials of the game, was actually used very briefly by Turner Broadcasting after their purchase of Jim Crockett Promotions before they switched to the WCW name, and the game's roster is made up of late-1980s WCW stars like the Road Warriors, the Midnight Express, Ric Flair, and Sting. WWE, who purchased WCW's assets in 2001, acknowledged the connection on their website.
