= Dragon View =

1994 video game

- North American box art
- Developer: Kemco
- Publisher: Kemco
- Platform: Super NES
- Release: JP: August 26, 1994; NA: November 1994
- Genre: Action role-playing
- Mode: Single-player

Dragon View, released in Japan as Super Drakkhen (Note: Japanese: スーパードラッケン), is a 1994 action role-playing video game developed and published by Kemco for the Super Nintendo Entertainment System. It is a follow-up but not a direct sequel to Infogrames' Drakkhen. It uses the same pseudo-3D overworld system for which the series is most famous. Other features of Dragon View are its side-view action role-playing game (RPG) hybrid gameplay (used when exploring more detailed areas such as towns and dungeons), its well translated first-person storyline, and its emphasis on player-driven undirected exploration. In 2019, the game was re-released through emulation for Windows. In 2022, a reproduction SNES cartridge was released by Limited Run Games.

== Gameplay ==
A screenshot of Dragon View's first-person overworld perspective.

The Drakkhen series' most recognizable feature is its custom overworld engine. First used by the original Amiga version of Drakkhen, it was later used in the PC and SNES ports. Gameplay levels use a horizontally scrolling engine like its predecessor.

== Reception ==
Reception

Review scores
Publication	Score
Electronic Gaming Monthly	7/10 (Note: In Electronic Gaming Monthly's review, three critics rated Dragon View 7/10, one 6/10, and another 8/10.)
GamePro	3.625/5 (Note: GamePro gave Dragon View two 4/5 scores for control and fun factor, 3.5/5 for graphics, and 3/5 for sound.)
Mega Fun	75%
Nintendo Power	3.3/5 (Note: Nintendo Power rated Dragon View 3.4/5 three times for graphics/sound, challenge, and theme/fun, and a 3/5 for play control.)
RPGFan	75%
Video Games (DE)	60%
