= Soul of the Samurai =

1999 video game

- North American cover art
- Developer: Konami Computer Entertainment Sapporo
- Publisher: Konami
- Director: Shinichi Kudo
- Producers: Kengo Nakamura; Koji Hiroshita
- Designers: Osamu Shigeta; Kazuhide Shirakura
- Programmers: Takayoshi Fukano; Tetsunori Saitō; Koji Taguchi,
- Artists: Hidehito Okamoto; Chihiro Narita; Atsushi Nakagawa
- Composer: Yasuhisa Ito
- Platform: PlayStation
- Release: JP: April 28, 1999; EU: September 15, 1999; NA: September 29, 1999
- Genre: Action-adventure
- Mode: Single-player

Soul of the Samurai (Japanese: 新時代劇アクション 羅刹の剣, Hepburn: Shin Jidaigeki Action: Rasetsu no Ken; lit. "Blade of the Rakshasa"), released as Ronin Blade in Europe, is an action-adventure game developed and published by Konami in 1999 for the PlayStation.

== Gameplay ==
From the start the player chooses to be either a young male ronin named Kotaro or a teenage female ninja named Lin (Rin). From then on he or she travels through prerendered levels, killing enemies and fulfilling their mission.

There is a single attack button, but combined with different directional buttons pressed in different combinations and held down for various intervals. There are different attack speeds which correlate to the weight of the equipped weapon, and this is displayed on the sword's 'check' window (also displayed is the sword's length and sharpness, and a brief description of the blade).

== Characters ==
Main characters:

- Kotarō Hiba: Kotarō is a masterless samurai who travels Japan. Not much is known about his roots, other than he grew up in a dojo with a boy called Yukinosuke, training in the ways of Japanese swordsmanship. Both were apparently raised by their 'master', and Kotarō reveals his parents have already died. Yukinosuke reveals, that when growing up, they were both of equal skill, with neither ever able to clearly defeat the other in sparring contests. Kotarō left suddenly one day after his parents died. He has a laid-back attitude to life and does not sit in the traditional seiza sitting position in the dojo.
- Lin (Rin): Lin is a ninja who was orphaned as a child. Both she and her brother, Shin were taken in by a ninja clan and trained in the art of ninjutsu until they were strong enough and skilled enough to carry out missions as a spy for the Tokugawa shogunate government. She resents the 'kid' image Kotarō uses on her, despite her youth. She has feelings for Kotarō, which is revealed at the game's end.

Kotarō's Path bosses:

- Unknown Ronin: The first boss in Kotarō's story, Kotarō finds the ronin killing a shogunate ninja (Genzō). This Ronin has no other description besides the scars on his face and completely white eyes. It is possible he is Sasaki Kojirō due to the fact that a long sword named Monohoshizao is obtained after defeating him, which was the name of the nodachi that Kojirō used in real life.
- Muga: Muga is the high priest of the Temple. Due to his body being host to the horrific 'soul bugs', he has been transformed into a giant and bizarre monster. Muga surprises Kotarō in the Temple, having knocked Kurenai unconscious, saying she will make a fine gift to Lord Tohjo. When asked what Lord Tohjo has to do with anything, Muga tells Kotaro that it does not matter because he will die soon anyway. Before their battle begins, Muga cracks his knuckles, saying that he has been praying to test his new powers. He is the second boss in Kotarō's path.
- Yukinosuke Koizumi: Yukinosuke is Kotarō's childhood friend. Along with Kotarō he trained under his 'master' in kenjutsu, and could not best Kotarō, although Kotarō could not beat him either. He secretly harbours a deep feeling of resentment towards this fact, and strives for a way to defeat Kotarō (though not to kill him). Some time after Kotarō left, he turned to Lord Tohjo and he gave him a soul bug, giving him more power. Despite this, the soul bug has not deformed him like other hosts, and he despises the soul bug.
- Urabe (Sōigen Ohtori in Japanese Version): A sorcerer who is enlisted to help in the creation and spread of the soul bugs. He has is a distinct boss due to the fact he does not wield a weapon or fight with his hands rather he attacks with a variety of magical spells. But after defeating him he transforms via the power of the soul bugs into a naked hunchback with an open spine that ends with a scorpion stinger and also gains the ability to breathe fire. He also has an electric left eye which may be the source of his power.
- Miyamoto Musashi (optional boss): The only samurai (later revealed to be a ronin) who can wield two swords at once. He challenges Kotarō Hiba to a duel of honor at Ganryu Beach. If the player chooses to fight him he reveals he is not like the previous bosses faced, rather he is a Ronin who just wants to fight Kotarō and he even goes to say that the events that are happening in the fiefdom "is of no concern to my swords". Defeating him earns a thanks before Musashi dies, as well as obtaining his two swords which can be equipped and used. These are the only swords in the game which can be used together in battle. The player must fight Musashi before fighting Yukinosuke, or he will get tired of waiting and leave.
- Gendō Tohjo (Gendō Kiryū in Japanese Version): Lord Tohjo is the ruler of the village's fiefdom. He has contacted Urabe and enlisted his help to create the soul bugs for him. He is a master is sōjutsu (Japanese spear art) and possibly jūkendō. Tohjo has unnatural power, and can heal himself using magic. After defeating him, he too is revealed to have a soul bug which causes him to sprout arms which are electric in nature as well as deform himself in a way. This is where the game ends whether the player chooses Kotarō's or Lin's path for the first time: the latter infected form can only be fought by playing through the second character's path via loading up the finished saved game.

Lin's Path bosses:

- Castle Head Guard: Lin finds Hanzō, a fellow shogunate ninja, dying from a wound inflicted by the Head Guard. The Guard then finds the two, and begins the battle with Lin. He is not alone in this boss battle as he calls upon his subordinates to come from every direction; however, he can be easily separated out among the other swordsmen as he is the only one wearing a blue outfit. He does not have any unblockable attacks.
- Undead Genzō: In Kotarō's path, he is revealed to be killed by the Unknown Ronin. This fact is unknown to Lin who is happy to see her friend alive, but after he pulls his basket hat he is shown to be an undead who is bent on destroying Lin.
- Karasu: A beautiful female ninja who is the head of a group of ninjas called Ravens. She is known for her skill in the art of Ninjitsu as well as for her trademark battle dance. Defeating her engages the player in another boss battle where she is shown to be a soul bug's host, which of course allows her access to more powers. After her final defeat she reveals Lin's brother Shin is with Lord Tohjo; according to her "it will be a tearful reunion". Her name means "Crow" in Japanese.
- The Three Wolverines: These are three Wolverine Ninja (named so because of their claw-like weapons) who are much more powerful than their normal counterparts. They are summoned to attack Lin by Oda, after her attempt to kill Lord Tohjo fails. Both Oda and Lord Tohjo then escape, leaving the three Wolverines to finish Lin. They attack very effectively as a team and even have teleport abilities. However, unlike many bosses, the Three Wolverines do not possess an unblockable attack.
- Shin (Full name Shinjirō the Swallow): Lin's elder brother appears also as a boss. True to Karasu's words it is a "tearful reunion" as Lin finds herself one on one with her brother, as he is infected with the soul bug which causes him to fight against his little sister. Very skilled fellow who has a good arsenal of fancy moves, he has an ability which allows him to send the shuriken acting like a boomerang.
- Two Soul Worms: After killing the 300 infected villagers, Lin fights two huge worms who look like some amalgamation of the dead bodies. Although they burrow into the ground, these Soul Worms are very easy to defeat compared to many of the game's other bosses.
- Infected Lord Tohjo: After meeting his apparent death by the hands of hero in the first path. Tohjo reveals he too is infected with the soul bug and sprouts six arms while he exudes an unholy aura, He also has in each of his arms a weapon that corresponds to an earlier boss that the heroes have faced. Note: he can only be fought by playing through a finished savegame with one character's path already finished. By loading the savegame and picking the second character's path, they will encounter the final bosses. It is up to the second character to send him back to Hell.
- Ryū Oda (Kurando Yūki in Japanese Version): Ryū Oda is a "military scholar" according to Kotarō Hiba and is also the main villain behind the soul bugs and the plan of conquering feudal Japan. He remains behind the scenes only appearing every now and then to some of the soul bug hosts as in the case of Yukinosuke and Urabe. He can be fought by either Kotarō or Lin, depending on which character was picked as the second path in a savegame where one character's path is already finished.
- Infected Ryū Oda: Ryū Oda shows to the reunited Lin and Kotarō that he is not only infected with the soul bugs but has also become the nest for them. After revealing his plans he mutates into a hideous multi-faced monster. Once Infected Lord Tohjo is defeated with the second character, the player will be given the option to fight this final boss with either Lin and Kotarō.

After defeating Ryū Oda and saving feudal Japan from the soul bugs, both Kotarō and Lin perform their final duties to their fallen friend and brother, respectively, and in the end decide to stay with each other.

== Development ==
An early version of the game, developed under the working title Shogun Assassin, featured young warriors named Hotaru and Hyaku, members of the shogunate secret police (their designs were the same as those of the final protagonists Kotaro and Lin). Earlier, the game was also known as Japan and Konami sources said the game would combine elements from Bushido Blade and Tenchu.

== Reception ==
Reception

Aggregate score
Aggregator	Score
GameRankings	63%

Review scores
Publication	Score
Electronic Gaming Monthly	5.5/10
Game Informer	4.25/10
GamePro	5/5
GameSpot	5.4/10
IGN	7.9/10
Official U.S. PlayStation Magazine	1.5/5
Joypad	6/10

The game received "mixed" reviews according to video game review aggregator GameRankings. According to a positive review in GamePro, Soul of the Samurai delivered "lively action melded to a compelling story line." On the other hand, GameSpot's review stated that "those looking for a ninja game of Tenchu's will unfortunately have to keep on looking."
