= List of cancelled Master System games =

Cancelled games of home video game console

The Master System is a video game console released by Sega in 1986, a western remodel of their Japanese "Mark III" console. While successful in Europe and Brazil, the system never gained a foothold in Japan or North America and was largely superseded in the early 1990s by its successor, the Sega Genesis, leading to several games being cancelled. Due to their similar hardware capabilities and architecture, many of these games had ports that were developed concurrently for Sega's Game Gear handheld system, though several of these were also cancelled. This list documents games that were confirmed to be announced or in development for the Master System at some point, but did not end up being released for it in any capacity.

== Games ==
There are currently 34 games on this list. (Note: This number is always up to date by this script.)

List of cancelled Master System games
Title(s)	Notes/Reasons	Developer	Publisher
Arch Rivals	A port of the 1989 arcade game was scheduled to release simultaneously on Master System and Genesis in 1992, though only the Genesis version saw release.		Flying Edge
Arena: Maze of Death	Versions for Master System and Game Gear were developed simultaneously, but Sega later decided the development team should focus exclusively on the Game Gear version, which was released in 1996.	Eden Entertainment Software	Sega
Battletoads	While Sega acquired the rights to port Rare's Battletoads (1991) to Sega Genesis and Game Gear, they did not do so for the Master System. As a result, Virgin Games acquired the Master System rights and began work on a port, originally scheduled for a 1993 release before being delayed and eventually cancelled.		Virgin Games
CJ Elephant Fugitive	A sequel to CJ's Elephant Antics (1991) was in development for Master System and Game Gear, but only the Game Gear version was released in 1994.	Big Red Software	Codemasters
Cube Zone	Cube Zone was among several first-party Master System titles announced for a Q1 1988 release, but the game never materialized and no details beyond its name were ever provided.		Sega
Daemonsgate	Versions of the 1993 PC game were announced for Game Gear and Master System, but never materialized.	Imagitec Design	Sega
Die Hard 2	A video game adaptation of Die Hard 2 was initially scheduled for release in December 1991, but was delayed multiple times before eventually being cancelled.	Tiertex	Grandslam
Dinobasher Starring Bignose the Caveman	A port of Big Nose the Caveman (1991) was announced for Game Gear and Master System, but neither version was released.	Optimus Software	Codemasters
Dinosaurs	Korean studio Open Production began development on a run and gun shooting game pitting the player against dinosaurs, but it was cancelled before ever being announced. An unfinished build of the game was later discovered on a pirate multicart.	Open Production	
Dropzone	Ports of the 1984 arcade game were announced for Master System, Game Gear, and Genesis, but only the Game Gear version released in 1994.	Big Red Software	Codemasters
Ernie Els Golf	Codemasters announced a golf game for Master System, Genesis, and Game Gear under the name Global Golf, later changed to Ernie Els Golf following a sponsorship deal with professional golfer Ernie Els. Only the Game Gear version was ultimately released.	Codemasters	Codemasters
The Excellent Dizzy Collection	A collection of three entries from the Dizzy series of games — Panic Dizzy (1990), Dizzy the Adventurer (1991), and the previously unreleased Go! Dizzy Go! — was scheduled for release in 1994. Despite being announced for the Sega Genesis, Sega CD, Master System, and Game Gear, only the Game Gear version ever materialized.	Interactive Studios	Codemasters
Gauntlet II	U.S. Gold was announced to be developing a Master System port of the arcade game in 1990, though this never came to pass.	Atari Games	U.S. Gold
The Godfather	A Master System port of The Godfather (1991), adapting the film of the same name, was scheduled for a December 1992 release, but failed to materialize.		U.S. Gold
Hook	Following the release of the film adaptation on several other systems, a Master System port was planned for release in October 1993, but was later cancelled.	Spidersoft	Sony Imagesoft
Indiana Jones and the Fate of Atlantis: The Action Game	Alongside the release of the adventure game Indiana Jones and the Fate of Atlantis (1992), a separate version subtitled The Action Game was released, which featured a similar plot but more combat oriented gameplay. A port of this version was announced for the Master System, but never released.	LucasArts	U.S. Gold
Last Action Hero	A video game adaption of the Last Action Hero film was released for Sega Genesis, Game Gear, SNES, Game Boy and PC. While a Master System version was also announced, it never materialized.	Bits Studios	Sony Imagesoft
Lemmings 2: The Tribes	A port of the multiplatform game was announced for Master System and Game Gear, but never materialized. However, ROMs of both versions were later released online.	Spidersoft	Psygnosis
Marko's Magic Football	Versions of the game for the Master System, Genesis, Sega CD and Game Gear were announced, but the Master System version was the only one to not see release.	The Cartoon Mavericks	Domark
Nick Faldo's Championship Golf	A Master System port was scheduled to be released in 1992, but never materialized.		Grandslam Interactive
Pat Riley Basketball	A Master System port of the Genesis game was announced, but never released.	Sega	Sega
Pete Sampras Tennis	A Master System version was scheduled to release in August 1994 alongside the Game Gear version, but failed to materialize.		Codemasters
Phantasy Star II	Development of Phantasy Star II initially began on the Master System, but later shifted to the Genesis as the scope of the game expanded, for which it was released in 1989.	Sega	Sega
Road Rash II	Master System and Game Gear versions of the 1992 Sega Genesis game were announced and scheduled for December 1994, but never materialized.	Electronic Arts	Electronic Arts
Robin Hood: Prince of Thieves	Following the 1991 release of a video game adaption of Robin Hood: Prince of Thieves for the NES and Game Boy in 1991, versions for Master System and Game Gear were announced, with the Master System version scheduled for release in October 1992, but were ultimately cancelled.	Sculptured Software	Virgin Games
Shinobi II	A Master System version of The Revenge of Shinobi (1989) was advertised in a 1990 Sega game catalog, though this never materialized.	Sega	Sega
Skyfox	Alongside the announcement that they would be distributing the Master System and several games in Germany, Ariolasoft announced that they would be producing several of their own games, including a port of Skyfox (1984). However, this port was never released.		Ariolasoft
Sonic's Edusoft	An educational game based on the Sonic the Hedgehog franchise was pitched to Sega, but ultimately rejected. The project was not known about until the late 2000s, when a member of the development team revealed its existence on a Sega fan site and uploaded an unfinished ROM onto the internet.	Tiertex	U.S. Gold, Sega
Spider-Man and the X-Men in Arcade's Revenge	A Master System version of the game was advertised in Sega Magazine alongside the Genesis and Game Gear versions, but was never released.		Flying Edge
Spider-Man and Venom: Maximum Carnage	Originally announced for the Game Gear, Sega Genesis, Master System, and Game Boy, only the Genesis version ever materialized.	Software Creations	Flying Edge
Striker	A Master System version of Striker (1992) was in development, but was moved to the Genesis as a result of the Master System's waning popularity.	Rage Software	Sega
Tintin on the Moon	A port of the original computer game of the same name was planned for the Master System, but suffered delays before ultimately failing to release.	Teeny Weeny Games	Virgin Games
Viking Child	Released for a variety of platforms, Game Gear and Master System versions were announced, and far enough along to be reviewed by Sega Pro, but never released.	Imagitec Design	Sega
Wallball-3D	A Master System racquetball game called Wallball-3D, which utilized the SegaScope 3-D glasses, was demonstrated at the 1986 Winter Consumer Electronics Show. However, the game was cancelled two weeks later due to poor reception by those at the show.	Sega	Sega
