= List of cancelled Game Gear games =

The Game Gear is a handheld video game console by Sega. With Sega finding success with their Sega Genesis in the early 1990s against rival Nintendo's Super NES, Sega decided to release a handheld competitor to Nintendo's Game Boy — the Game Gear. The Game Gear was able to find some success from the Genesis's popularity, and its ability to easily port Sega's older Master System games to it, but as the Genesis faded in the mid-1990s, the Game Gear slowed and eventually ended production. While doing better than many competitors, it still sold only a tenth as many units as the Game Boy, and towards the end of its life, had many games cancelled while companies focused on Game Boy or other versions instead. This list documents games that were confirmed for release for the Game Gear at some point, but did not end up being released for it.

== Games ==
There are currently 42 games on this list. (Note: This number is always up to date by this script.)

List of cancelled Game Gear games
Title(s)	Notes/Reasons	Developer	Publisher
Akira	A video game adaption of the 1988 Akira film beyond the Akira game released in 1988 was announced for the Game Gear, Sega Genesis, Sega CD, SNES, and Game Boy. Gameplay and content varied wildly among versions, but no versions ended up releasing. The Game Gear version was about 30% complete when it was cancelled after its main programmer left the company. Only one public screenshot is known to exist, with all other known content being destroyed after cancellation.	Black Pearl Software	THQ
Baby Boom	One of a few games proposed by Sega to publish games that would appeal more to females, the game entailed controlling a hand that would move babies out of harm's way. The game was announced for the Game Gear, Sega Genesis and Sega CD, but never released in any capacity. According to developer Ed Annunziata, the game was cancelled because the moving of the hand cursor was not fun with a d-pad controller.	Sega	Sega
Barbie Super Model	A Game Gear version of the 1993 Sega Genesis, Super Nintendo and PC game was announced at CES 1994. It was a complete conversion of the other versions of the game, and was reportedly completely finished. The game never released officially, for undisclosed reasons, though the game eventually leaked onto the internet many years later.	Hi Tech Expressions	Hi Tech Expressions
Battletoads in Battlemaniacs	A Game Gear port of the SNES game was announced and scheduled for release in July 1994, but never released.		
Beethoven: The Ultimate Canine Caper	A video game adaption of the Beethoven's 2nd film, was announced for the Game Gear and Sega Genesis, but only ever released for Game Boy, SNES, and MS-DOS.	Hi Tech Expressions	Hi Tech Expressions
BreakThru!	A Game Gear version was advertised alongside the SNES, Game Boy, Sega Channel, Sega Saturn, PlayStation 1 versions, but was the only version to never be released.	Realtime Associates	Zoo Corporation
Bubsy II	A Game Gear version of the Sega Genesis, SNES, and Game Boy game was announced, but never released with the other versions.	Accolade	Accolade
Captain Dynamo	Versions of the PC release were announced for the Game Gear and Sega Genesis, but neither ever released.	Codemasters	Codemasters
Cave Dude	A platformer game announced for the Game Gear at CES 1993. It was far enough along in development to be sent a review copy to GamePro magazine in October 1993, and was scheduled for release the following month, but the game never ended up being released. The game was described as a simplistic take on Super Mario with no memorable music.	Open Corp.	Innovation Software
Columns III: Revenge of Columns	A Game Gear port of the Sega Genesis game was announced at CES 1994, but never released. It was described as largely the same as the Genesis version in gameplay and features, outside of only allowing a single player to play on the screen at a time due to the Game Gear's small screen.	Sega	Sega
Daemonsgate	Version of the PC game were announced for Game Gear and the Master System, but never materialized.	Imagitec Design	Sega
David Robinson's Supreme Court	A Game Gear version of the game was announced a few months after the Sega Genesis version released, but the Game Gear version never materialized.	Sega	Sega
Dinobasher Starring Bignose the Caveman	A port of the 1991 Nintendo Entertainment System game Big Nose the Caveman announced for the Game Gear and Master System. The Game Gear version was far enough along to be reviewed in Sega Pro, but never released. Its poor reception in pre-release reviews is thought to be a factor in its cancellation.	Optimus Software	Codemasters
Dooley the Dinosaur	A Game Gear port of the Master System version was announced, and present at CES 1993, but never released.	Daou Infosys Corp.	Innovation Software
Fire & Ice	Released on a variety of PC platforms in the early 1990s, a version for the Sega Genesis and Game Gear was scheduled for release in early 1994, but never materialized.	Graftgold Creative Software	Virgin Games
Frogger	The 1981 arcade game was ported to a large number of video game consoles in the 1980s and 1990s. A Game Gear version with reworked graphics and gameplay was announced, and far enough along for Sega Pro to review it, but the Game Gear version never released due to ongoing disputes over rights to Frogger between Konami and Sega.	Sega	Sega
The Getaway: High Speed II	A video game adaption of the pinball machine of the same name. Both Game Gear and Game Boy versions were announced, though only the Game Boy version ever materialized.	Unexpected Development	Williams Entertainment
The Humans	Released for Sega Genesis, SNES Game Boy, and Atari Jaguar, and a number of PC platforms in the early 1990s, a Game Gear version was announced, and far enough along for Sega Pro to review in their May 1993 issue, but this version never materialized.	Imagitec Design	GameTek
Journey to the Center of the Earth	A video game adaption of the television series of the same name announced for the Game Gear, Sega CD, SNES, NES and Game Boy. While multiple adaptions released in the 1980s and 2000s, none of the proposed versions of the 1990s, Game Gear included, ever released.		Sony Imagesoft
Lemmings 2: The Tribes	A port of the multiplatform game was announced for the Game Gear and Master System, but never materialized. It was far enough along to be reviewed by Sega Pro, who gave it an 86% rating, so its cancellation is thought to have been over waning interest in the Game Gear rather than quality issues. ROMs of both versions were later released online.	Spidersoft	Psygnosis
The Mask	A video game adaption of The Mask (1994) was announced for Game Gear, SNES and Sega Genesis. However, development was slow and took longer than expected to complete, leading to the development team cancelling the Sega platforms in order to focus on releasing the SNES version, which released a year after the film's release in late 1995.	Black Pearl Software	THQ
Michael Jordan: Chaos in the Windy City	Released for the SNES in late 1994, versions for the Game Gear and Sega Genesis were announced, but never materialized.	Electronic Arts	Electronic Arts
NHL 96	Advertisements mentioned a Game Gear release, but the game only ended up releasing on Sega Genesis, SNES, and Game Boy.	High Score Entertainment	Electronic Arts
Off the Wall	Released as an arcade game in 1991, a Game Gear port was scheduled for release in 1993. The game was to feature the ability to link up multiple Game Gears for multiplayer to recreate the multiplayer mode in the arcade game. The game was previewed in magazines and featured at CES 1993, but never released on Game Gear.	Teeny Weeny Games	Tengen
Pac-In-Time	Released for the SNES, Game Boy, and PC platforms, Game Gear and Sega Genesis versions were scheduled for late 1995, but never materialized. The Game Gear version leaked onto the internet almost a decade later.	Kalisto Entertainment	Namco
Peaky Blinder	A side-scrolling game involving the player controlling "Peaky", a literal amalgamation and personification of garbage, which aspires to overcome his life in the slums to become a respectable person in a nice house. The game featured a shapeshifting gameplay mechanic for fighting enemies. Announced for a wide variety of platforms - SNES, Game Boy, Sega Game Gear, Sega CD, and the Sega Genesis, the game never released in any capacity for any platforms.		Sales Curve Interactive
Prime	A beat-'em-up game based on the Malibu Comics superhero Prime was in development, but was cancelled.	Malibu Interactive	Malibu Interactive
Ragnarok	A version of the Amiga and MS-DOS release King's Table: The Legend of Ragnarok was announced under the shortened title Ragnarok were announced for the Sega Genesis and Game Gear, but neither ever materialized.	Imagitec Design	
Rampart	An arcade game ported to a wide variety of platforms in the early 1990s, a Game Gear version was scheduled for release as well, but never materialized.	Atari Games	Tengen
Road Rash II	Game Gear and Master System versions of the 1992 Sega Genesis released were announced and scheduled for December 1994, but never materialized. The game was later ported to Game Boy Color well after the fact in a separate porting effort.	Electronic Arts	Electronic Arts
Robin Hood: Prince of Thieves	A video game adaption of Robin Hood: Prince of Thieves released for the NES and Game Boy in 1991, an identical Game Gear version was announced and scheduled into 1993, and present at CES 1993, but never released.	Sculptured Software	Virgin Games
SeaQuest DSV	A video game adaption of the television series SeaQuest DSV was announced for release for the Game Gear, Sega Genesis, SNES, and Game Boy. Only the Game Gear version never materialized.		THQ
Spider-Man and Venom: Maximum Carnage	Originally announced for the Game Gear, Sega Genesis, Master System, and Game Boy, only the Genesis version ever materialized.	Software Creations	Acclaim Entertainment
Spirou	A video game adaption of the Spirou comics, the game centered around controlling Spirou in a platformer video game. Versions for the Sega Genesis, SNES, Game Boy, and Windows were all released across 1995 and 1996. It was also scheduled for release in on the Game Gear 1996, which would have made it among the last of games to release for it, but it never released in any capacity.	Bit Managers	Infogrames
Street Hero (Janggun-ui Adeul)	Announced as a side-scrolling beat 'em up the Game Gear and present at CES 1993, the game never materialized.	Daou Infosys	Innovation Software
Street Racer	The game was released for a wide variety of 16-bit and later 32-bit platforms, though the announced Game Gear and 32X versions missed their November 1995 released date and never materialized.		Ubisoft
Sylvester and Tweety in Cagey Capers	A Sylvester and Tweety game for Game Gear was listed for release in late 1993, but never materialized, though a Genesis version would be released the following year.		Time Warner Interactive
Trunkski	A platformer featuring an elephant that uses its trunk to attack, it never released in any capacity.	Core Design	
Viking Child/Prophecy I: The Viking Child	Released for a variety of platforms, Game Gear and Master System versions were announced, and far enough along to be reviewed by Sega Pro, but never released.	Imagitec Design	Sega
We're Back! A Dinosaur's Story	A video game adaption of the We're Back: A Dinosaur's Story released for Sega Genesis, SNES, and Game Boy, the Game Gear version was never finished or released.	Hi Tech Expressions	Hi Tech Expressions
WildSnake	Game Gear and Sega Genesis versions of the game were advertised, but only the SNES and Game Boy versions ever materialized.	Bullet-Proof Software	Spectrum HoloByte
Yogi Bear's Gold Rush	Originally announced for the Game Gear and Game Boy, only the Game Boy version ever materialized. A playable copy of the Game Gear version leaked online many years later.	Sunsoft	GameTek
