= Barry Leitch =

Scottish video game music composer

Barry Leitch is a Scottish video game music composer. His work includes the Lotus Turbo Challenge, TFX, Gauntlet Legends, Gauntlet Dark Legacy, Top Gear, and Rush video game series.

== Games ==
- The Addams Family (Game Boy, NES - Ocean)
- Airborne Ranger (Atari ST, Amiga - Microprose)
- American Gladiators (Atari ST, Amiga, Genesis, SNES - Gametek)
- Back to the Future Part III (C64 - Probe - not published)Battlefield (C64 - Atlantis Software)
- Blow it up (PC, Xbox, PS4, Switch - Brainseal Entertainment)
- Bonnie's Bookstore (PC - Popcap and New Crayon Games)
- Boss Rally (PC)
- BSS Jane Seymour (PC - Gremlin Graphics)
- Butcher Hill (Amiga - Gremlin Graphics)
- Captain Blood (Spectrum - Infogrames)
- Captain Courageous (C64 - English Software)
- Championship Manager (PC - Domark)
- Combo Racer (Amiga - Gremlin Graphics)
- Daemonsgate (Atari ST, Amiga, PC - Gremlin Graphics)
- Dark Quest (Android, iOS, PC - BrainSeal Entertainment)
- Dark Quest 2 (PC, Xbox, PS4, Switch - Brainseal Entertainment)
- Dark Quest 3 (PC, Xbox, PS4, Switch - Brainseal Entertainment)
- Demoniak (PC - Bitmap Brothers)
- DNA Warrior (Amiga - ACE)
- Double Dragon (C64 Console - Gremlin Graphics)
- Drakan: Order of the Flame (PC - Psygnosis)
- Eek! The Cat (SNES - Ocean)
- Emlyn Hughes International Soccer (C64 - Audiogenic Software 1988)
- Ferrari Formula One (C64, Atari ST, Spectrum, PC - Electronic Arts 1990)
- Fiendish Freddy's Big Top o' Fun (C64, Spectrum, Amstrad CPC)
- Federation of Free Traders (PC - Gremlin Graphics)
- Frankenstein (Amiga - Enigma Variations - possibly never released)
- Gadget Twins (Atari ST, Amiga, Genesis, SNES - Gametek)
- Gauntlet Dark Legacy (Atari ST)
- Gauntlet Legends (Atari ST)
- Gemini Wing (C64, Atari ST, Amiga, Spectrum, Amstrad CPC - The Sales Curve 1988)
- Geometry Survivor (PC, Xbox, PS4, Switch - Brainseal Entertainment)
- Gilbert (C64, Atari ST, Amiga, Spectrum, Amstrad CPC - Enigma Variations 1989)
- Harlequin (Amiga, Atari ST - Gremlin Graphics 1992)
- HeroQuest (C64, Atari ST, Amiga, Spectrum, Amstrad CPC, PC - Gremlin Graphics)
- Horizon Chase (Android, iOS - Aquiris)
- Horizon Chase Turbo (Xbox, PS4, PC, Switch - Aquiris)
- Horizon Chase 2 (iOS, PC, Switch - Aquiris)
- The Humans (Atari ST, Amiga, PC, Genesis, SNES, Lynx - Mirage)
- Icups (C64 - Odin Software)
- Imperium (PC - Electronic Arts)
- Impossamole (C64, Atari ST, Amiga, Spectrum, Amstrad CPC, PC - Gremlin Graphics)
- Inferno (PC - Ocean)
- Jack Nicklaus Golf (NES - Gremlin Graphics)
- Jane's Apache Longbow (PC CD Audio - Electronic Arts)
- Kick Off 2 (Game Boy, NES - Anco)
- Kill Team (PlayStation, Sega Saturn - not published)
- Legacy (PC - not published)
- Lethal Weapon (Atari ST, Amiga, SNES - Ocean)
- Lords of Chaos (PC - not published)
- Lotus 2 (Atari ST, Amiga - Gremlin Graphics)
- Marauder (C64 - Hewson Consultants 1988)
- MicroProse Soccer (Atari ST, Amiga, Spectrum, Amstrad CPC - Microprose)
- Mindbender (PC - Gremlin Graphics)
- Necromancer (Amiga, PC)
- Nightbreed (RPG) (C64, Spectrum, Amstrad CPC - Ocean)
- Ocean Football (Amiga - Ocean)
- Pegasus (Atari ST, Amiga - Gremlin Graphics)
- Pit-Fighter (PC - Domark)
- Postman Pat (C64, Spectrum, Amstrad CPC - Enigma Variations)
- Powermonger (PC - Electronic Arts)
- Premier League (Amiga - Ocean)
- The President Is Missing (Atari ST, Amiga - Cosmi)
- Privateer Missions (PC - Origin Systems)
- Viking Child (Atari ST, Amiga, Lynx - Gametek)
- Ragnarok (Atari ST, Amiga, PC - Gremlin Graphics)
- Ratpack (Atari ST, Amiga, Spectrum, Amstrad CPC, PC - Microprose)
- Redline (Atari ST, Amiga, PC - Gremlin Graphics)
- RoboCop 3 (PC - Ocean)
- Rock 'n' Roll (Atari ST, Spectrum, Amstrad CPC)
- Rush 2: Extreme Racing USA (N64 - Atari)
- San Francisco Rush 2049 (N64 - Dreamcast - Midway Arcade Treasures 3 (GC, PS2, Xbox))
- Worlds of Ultima: The Savage Empire (Genesis, SNES - Pony Canyon/FCI/Origin Systems)
- Shadow (PC)
- Shockway Rider (Atari ST, Amiga - Faster Than Light)
- First Class with the Shoe People (Atari ST, Amiga, PC - Gremlin Graphics)
- Shut It (PC - Ocean)
- Silkworm (C64, Atari ST, Amiga, Spectrum, Amstrad CPC - Sales Curve)
- Sleepwalker (Amiga CD ROM - Ocean)
- Soccer (Atari ST, Amiga - Gremlin Graphics)
- Space Crusade (C64, Amiga, PC)
- Speedball 2 (PC - Bitmap Brothers)
- Spider: The Video Game (PlayStation, Sega Saturn - Boss Game Studios)
- Starglider 2 (Spectrum - Firebird)
- Stratego (C64, Atari ST, Amiga - Accolade)
- Story Of A Gladiator (PC, Xbox, PS4, Switch - Brainseal Entertainment)
- Super Cars (NES - Gremlin Graphics)
- Super Cars II (Atari ST, Amiga - Gremlin Graphics)
- Super Dragon Slayer (C64 - Codemasters)
- Supremacy (PC - Probe)
- Suspicious Cargo (Atari ST, Amiga - Gremlin Graphics)
- Suzuki (PC - Gremlin Graphics)
- Switchblade (C64 - Gremlin Graphics)
- Switchblade 2 (Atari ST, Amiga - Gremlin Graphics)
- Swivel (MetaQuest)
- Tank (Virtual Boy - not published)
- TFX (Amiga, PC - Ocean)
- Top Gear (SNES - Gremlin Graphics)
- Top Gear Rally (Nintendo 64 - Boss Game Studios)
- Toyota Rally (PC - Gremlin Graphics)
- Treasure Trap (C64, Atari ST, Amiga, PC)
- Twisted Edge Extreme Snowboarding (N64 - Boss Game Studios)
- Universal Studios Classic Monsters (Atari ST, Amiga - Ocean)
- Utopia: The Creation of a Nation (Atari ST, Amiga, PC - Gremlin Graphics)
- Wayne Gretzky's Hockey 99 (N64, Atari)
- Weird Dreams (C64, PC - Firebird)
- Wheel of Fortune (NES - Gametek)
- Wing Commander II: Vengeance of the Kilrathi (Genesis, SNES - Origin Systems)
- Wing Commander III: Heart of the Tiger (PC (in flight dialogue) - Origin Systems)
- Wings of Glory (PC - Origin Systems)
- Xenophobe (C64, Atari ST, Amiga, Spectrum, Amstrad CPC - Microstyle)
- Xiphos (Atari ST, Amiga, PC)
- Zone Warrior (C64, Atari ST, Amiga - Electronic Arts)
