= Happily Ever After (1989 film) =

1989 animated film

- Original film poster
- Directed by: John Howley
- Written by: Robby London; Martha Moran
- Produced by: Lou Scheimer
- Starring: Dom DeLuise; Phyllis Diller; Zsa Zsa Gabor; Ed Asner; Sally Kellerman; Irene Cara; Carol Channing; Tracey Ullman
- Edited by: Joe Gall; Jeffrey C. Patch
- Music by: Frank Becker
- Production company: Filmation Associates
- Distributed by: First National Film Corp.
- Release dates: June 30, 1989 (Philippines); May 28, 1993 (United States)
- Running time: 74 minutes
- Country: United States
- Language: English
- Budget: $6.8 million
- Box office: $3.3 million

Happily Ever After (originally released as Snow White: The Adventure Continues in the Philippines) (Note: Also known as Snow White: Happily Ever After and Happily Ever After: Snow White's Greatest Adventure.) is a 1989 animated musical fantasy film directed by John Howley, and starring the voices of Dom DeLuise, Malcolm McDowell, Phyllis Diller, Zsa Zsa Gabor, Ed Asner, Sally Kellerman, Irene Cara, Carol Channing and Tracey Ullman. The film serves as a direct sequel to the Snow White fairy tale, wherein the titular heroine and the Prince are about to be married, but a new threat appears in the form of the late Evil Queen's vengeful brother, Lord Maliss. The plot replaces the Dwarfs with female cousins called the Dwarfelles, who aid Snow White against Maliss.

Happily Ever After is unrelated to Filmation's fellow A Snow White Christmas, a 1980 TV special in which continuity is deliberately and consequently ignored. Following extensive legal troubles with The Walt Disney Company, it had a poor financial and critical reception following its wide release in 1993. A video game adaptation was released in 1994.

== Plot ==
Princess Snow White and her beloved Prince prepare to marry following their victory over Snow White's stepmother, the Evil Queen. Upon learning of his sister's death, the Queen's brother, Lord Maliss, vows to avenge her. Maliss seizes control of the castle, transforms the kingdom into a wasteland, and turns himself into a dragon. Meanwhile, in Maliss's absence, the owl Scowl attempts to "train" the bat Batso in the ways of evil. However, his efforts prove unsuccessful due to his own incompetence

The following day, Snow White and the Prince are picking flowers in a meadow for their upcoming wedding when Maliss attacks them. He overpowers the Prince and takes him captive, while Snow White manages to escape into the woods. She eventually reaches the cottage of the Seven Dwarfs, where she meets their seven female cousins, known as the Dwarfelles: Muddy, Sunburn, Blossom, Marina, Critterina, Moonbeam, and Thunderella. Snow White also discovers that the Dwarfs have left the cottage after purchasing another mine in a different kingdom. The Dwarfelles offer to help her and take her to meet Mother Nature at Rainbow Falls.

Upon arriving at Rainbow Falls, Mother Nature reprimands Thunderella for failing to control her powers properly. She also criticizes the other Dwarfelles for misusing their abilities and threatens to take their powers away unless they learn to use them responsibly. Before they can resolve the matter, Maliss arrives and attacks them. However, Mother Nature strikes him with lightning, causing him to crash and revert to his human form. Before departing, Maliss reveals to Snow White that the Prince is being held captive in his castle. Snow White and the Dwarfelles set out for Maliss's castle in the Realm of Doom. Along the way, they encounter a mysterious cloaked figure known as the Shadow Man. Maliss sends a pack of wolves after them, but the group manages to escape with the Shadow Man's assistance.

Furious at their escape, Maliss transforms into his dragon form and successfully captures Snow White, taking her to his castle. The Dwarfelles follow him but initially struggle to find a way inside. Meanwhile, Scowl and Batso, still hoping to prove themselves worthy of serving Maliss, attempt to capture one of the Dwarfelles. However, their plan backfires spectacularly, inadvertently giving the Dwarfelles an opportunity to enter the castle. Once inside, they fight off Maliss's minions. At the same time, Snow White is reunited with the Prince, only to discover that he is actually Maliss in disguise. Maliss attempts to petrify her, but the Shadow Man intervenes. Although he initially manages to overpower Maliss, the sorcerer eventually defeats him, seemingly killing him.

As Maliss continues his attempt to petrify Snow White, the seven Dwarfelles arrive and launch an attack against him. They briefly manage to drive him away from Snow White, but Maliss retaliates by petrifying six of them. Thunderella is the only Dwarfelle left unharmed, and she manages to free Snow White. Taking advantage of a distraction created by Thunderella, Snow White defeats Maliss by throwing the petrifying cloak over him. This forces him to transform into his dragon form, causing him to grow to an enormous size as lightning repeatedly strikes him. His head eventually reverts to its human form before he is ultimately petrified. With Maliss defeated, the Dwarfelles are restored to normal. However, Snow White mourns the apparent loss of both the Shadow Man and the Prince. Just then, the Shadow Man revives and transforms back into the Prince, revealing that Maliss had cursed him and transformed him into the mysterious figure.

Having witnessed the Dwarfelles finally work together as a team, Mother Nature decides to let them keep their powers. She also grants them permission to attend Snow White's wedding. Meanwhile, she takes Scowl and Batso on as her new apprentices. Having quit smoking and regained his ability to breathe properly, Scowl assures Batso that working for Mother Nature will not be so bad. However, Mother Nature soon proves to be even more demanding toward the pair than she ever was toward the Dwarfelles. With Maliss defeated and the Prince restored to his true form, Snow White and her beloved finally reunite. The two share a kiss and look forward to their happily ever after.

== Cast ==
- Irene Cara as Snow White, a beautiful young princess who is now engaged to the Prince and forced to stop her step-uncle, Lord Maliss.
- Malcolm McDowell as Lord Maliss, a powerful enchanter who seeks revenge for the death of his sister the Evil Queen by destroying his step-niece, Snow White, and her beloved prince.
- Phyllis Diller as Mother Nature, a ditsy embodiment of the forces of nature that gave the Seven Dwarfelles their powers.
- Michael Horton as The Prince, Snow White's handsome fiancé who is now being kidnapped by his fiancé's step-uncle, Lord Maliss, who turns him into the Shadow Man.
- Dom DeLuise as the Looking Glass, a smart-alec mirror who always speaks in rhyme.
- Carol Channing as Muddy, a Dwarfelle who has power over the earth and the bossy leader of the Seven Dwarfelles.
- Zsa Zsa Gabor as Blossom, a Dwarfelle who has power over plants and flowers.
- Linda Gary as:
  - Marina, a Dwarfelle who has power over lakes and rivers.
  - Critterina, a squirrel-like Dwarfelle who has power over animals.
- Jonathan Harris as the Sunflower, Mother Nature's grumpy assistant.
- Sally Kellerman as Sunburn, a Dwarfelle who has power over sunlight and has a foul temper. At heart, she is a nice and helpful individual.
- Tracey Ullman as:
  - Moonbeam, a nocturnal Dwarfelle who has power over the night.
  - Thunderella, a Dwarfelle who has power over the weather including thunder and lightning.
- Ed Asner as Scowl, a sarcastic owl who tries to impress Maliss but always fails disastrously. Because of his smoking, he is all but incomprehensible due to frequent coughs and wheezes.
- Frank Welker as Batso, a timid bat who is Scowl's only friend.
  - Welker also provides the uncredited vocal effects of Maliss' dragon form, the Shadow Man, and Maliss' wolves.

== Music ==
All lyrics are written by Stephanie Tyrell.

No.	Title	Writer(s)	Performer(s)	Length
1.	"The Baddest"	Ashley Hall	Ed Asner
2.	"Thunderella's Song"	Richard Kerr	Tracey Ullman
3.	"Mother Nature's Song"	Barry Mann	Phyllis Diller
4.	"Love Is the Reason"	John Lewis Parker	Irene Cara

== Production ==
The film's production commenced in 1986 and was done 60% overseas. The American animation company Filmation had previously developed a plan to create a series of direct-to-video sequels to fairy tales which were made popular by Disney motion pictures, but only Pinocchio and the Emperor of the Night and Happily Ever After were ever completed. The film's working titles included The Further Adventures of Snow White, Snow White: The Adventure Continues and Snow White in the Land of Doom. Some early merchandise did use the title Snow White in the Land of Doom.

However, Walt Disney Productions' chairman Jeffrey Katzenberg and spokesman Tom Deegan regarded the projects as "blatant rip-offs" of their properties. This led to a lawsuit by The Walt Disney Company in 1987 following the release of Emperor of the Night. Filmation thus promised their characters would not resemble those of the Disney incarnation, and changed the title to Snow White and the Seven Dwarfelles and eventually Happily Ever After. They also replaced the Seven Dwarfs with female counterparts, the Dwarfelles.

According to the film's producer Lou Scheimer, black actress Irene Cara's casting as Snow White was regarded by many (including Cara herself) at the time as strangely "colorblind". Mother Nature's original actress was Joni Mitchell. Scheimer also noted his version of Snow White as the story's actual heroine, as it is she who rescues the prince in an inversion of the traditional version. The character of Maliss was based on the actor Basil Rathbone.

== Release ==
Reportedly completed by 1988, the film premiered in the Philippines on June 30, 1989 as Snow White: The Adventure Continues. It was also released on November 10, 1989 in Italy as Snow White: And They Lived Happily Ever After and on June 20, 1990 in France as Snow White and the Haunted Castle. Theatrical exhibition in the United States was intended sometime around late 1988 or early 1989; however, because Filmation shut down in 1989, it didn't see a release in the US until May 28, 1993, the same summer that Disney's Snow White and the Seven Dwarfs received a re-release. The four-day Memorial Day weekend taking was $1.76 million, $2.8 million after ten days and $3.2 million by the next month. The release was preceded by a $10 million advertising campaign and a substantial merchandising effort from North American distributor First National Film Corp. In 1998, the U.S. Securities and Exchange Commission entered a civil enforcement judgment enjoining officers of First National Entertainment Corp. for issuing false and misleading revenue projections for Happily Ever After, improperly trading stock based on undisclosed information, and failing to meet required reporting obligations.

=== Home media ===
Happily Ever After was issued on VHS and LaserDisc by Worldvision and later on DVD (in an edit censoring some violence) by 20th Century Fox Home Entertainment. In 2007, BCI Eclipse released a storybook-themed DVD set with Happily Ever After, Journey Back to Oz, and another "Snow White" sequel film, A Snow White Christmas. This release contains the uncut version of the film, but due to it being taken from a PAL master copy, the film's speed and sound pitch are raised by 4%.

As of 2016, the rights to the film are owned by Universal Pictures through DreamWorks Animation under their ownership of DreamWorks Classics, which holds much of the Filmation catalog.

== Reception ==
Despite a substantial advertising campaign and having been expected to become "one of the biggest hits of the year," Happily Ever After performed poorly in the box office during its theatrical run. Its domestic gross was only $3,299,382.

It received generally negative reviews. According to Stephen Holden of The New York Times, "visually, Happily Ever After is mundane. The animation is jumpy, the settings flat, the colors pretty but less than enchanting. The movie's strongest element is its storytelling, which is not only imaginative but also clear and smoothly paced." Kevin Thomas of Los Angeles Times opined the characters (especially the Prince) were "bland" and called the film's songs "instantly forgettable." Rita Kemple of The Washington Post derided the "inane" humor attempts as well as "badly drawn characters" and their "clumsy" animation. Desert News' Chris Hicks similarly wrote: "Sadly, the animation here is weak, the gags even weaker and the story completely uninvolving." Steve Daly of Entertainment Weekly gave the film a score of F and recommended to "give this Snow White the big kiss-off." Chicago Tribune's Mark Caro wrote that the comparison with Disney's classic Snow White "couldn't be more brutal." The film currently has a 40% approval rating based on 10 reviews on Rotten Tomatoes, with an average rating of 5.9/10. Jerry Beck's The Animated Movie Guide gave it zero stars, citing a "rushed" look, convoluted plot, "mundane" action, mediocre animation, and "wasted" star voice cast, contrasting it with the "wit, charm, and heart" of the Disney film.

Other reviews were more positive. Jeff Shannon of Seattle Times opined that "this one's a cut above in the animation contest, deserving attention in the once-exclusive realm of Disney and Don Bluth. It almost, but not quite, escapes those nagging comparisons." Ralph Novak of People wrote that although "the animation is less sophisticated than the Disney standard," the story "moves nicely, though," with a "colorful" cast of voices. Candice Russell of Sun-Sentinel called it "a sweet and likable film," crediting a screenplay "that avoids cuteness and sentimentality and remembers that kiddie fare is fun" and "a few charming songs adding to the merriment."

== Video game ==
An unreleased Nintendo Entertainment System video game was planned in 1991. A Sega game was also considered in 1993. An eventual Super Nintendo Entertainment System version was developed by ASC Games and released by Imagitec Design four years later (and one year after the film's release) in 1994.
