= Ferrari Formula One =

1988 video game

- North American MS-DOS cover art
- Developer: Imagitec Design
- Publisher: Electronic Arts
- Producer: Joss Ellis
- Designer: Rick Koenig
- Composer: Barry Leitch
- Platforms: Amiga, Atari ST, Commodore 64, MS-DOS, PC-98
- Release: Amiga, PC-98; 1988; Atari ST, MS-DOS; 1989; C64; 1990
- Genre: Racing
- Mode: Single-player

Ferrari Formula One, sometimes subtitled Grand Prix Racing Simulation, is a racing video game developed by Imagitec Design and published by Electronic Arts between 1988 and 1990 for the Amiga, Atari ST, Commodore 64, MS-DOS, and PC-98 computers. Versions for the Amstrad CPC and ZX Spectrum were also planned but never released.

== Gameplay ==
The player has the Ferrari F1-86 available to participate in the 1986 racing season. They have their own base camp at the Fiorano Circuit where the car can be fine-tuned and tested on the track. For example, they can test the aerodynamics in the wind tunnel or the engine in the lab and then adjust numerous parameters. However, it's up to the player to delve into the technical details or immediately switch to driving; or conversely, they can also set up automatic driving and focus solely on management.

The interface is icon-based and uses a pointer, even without a mouse. The date and time of 1986 are constantly displayed in the menus, and the races follow the scheduled calendar; time flows in both real time and accelerated time during automatic operations.

As the player tackle the 16 races of the championship, you'll travel to the venue, starting at the Jacarepaguá Circuit, and players still have the option to adjust the car in the pits, though limited to simpler modifications like tire changes. Each Grand Prix includes the various phases of the real races with their corresponding times: two official practice sessions and two qualifying sessions, and on the third day, the warm-up and finally the actual race. Players can run a number of laps similar to the real race, with races lasting hours, or much less. It's possible to jump directly to a specific Grand Prix or a particular phase, with the corresponding change to the date and time, but you'll forfeit the points earned in the skipped races.

The realistic driving experience is presented from a first-person view, including the onboard instruments and rearview mirrors displayed on the car. Steering, acceleration, and braking can also be controlled with the mouse. The gearbox is either automatic or manual depending on the difficulty level. The Commodore 64 obviously lacks a mouse option, but a minimap of the track is available during the race. Accidents can occur due to damage and wear to components, including extended repair times or the driver needing to be hospitalized.

== Reception ==
Reception

Review scores
Publication	Score
Zzap!64	95%
The Games Machine	93%
Gen4	87%
ACE	85.6%
Computer and Video Games	28/40

The Games Machine wrote: "The only similarity between Ferrari Formula One and Pole Position is that they are both racing games. Essentially, it's a pure simulation, so it probably won't appeal to arcade gamers, but simulation enthusiasts will enjoy it immensely. The game has faithfully recreated the atmosphere of Grand Prix racing, undoubtedly being the most realistic to date. Ferrari Formula One is a masterpiece that no Amiga owner should miss."

ACE wrote: "The perspective used throughout the game is very realistic: you really get the impression of racing around the circuit at full speed, with barely 20mm between the asphalt and the seat. The sound effects are also excellent and contribute to making it an engaging and extremely playable game, worthy of a place in any racing fan's collection."

Computer and Video Games wrote: "Ferrari Formula One is sophisticated, complex, testing and very absorbing game perhaps it's only problem is that it's not very exciting."
