= Netzone =

1996 video game

NET:Zone
- Developer: Compro Software
- Publisher: GameTek
- Platforms: MS-DOS, Microsoft Windows
- Release: 1996
- Genre: Adventure game
- Mode: Single-player

Netzone, stylized as NET:Zone, is a computer game developed by Compro Software and published by GameTek in 1996 for the PC.

== Gameplay ==
In NET:Zone, the player moves through a 3‑D rendered virtual‑reality world from a first‑person perspective. Interaction is handled by pointing and clicking to pick up or manipulate objects. Movement occurs by clicking on unobstructed areas of the screen, causing the player to step forward in large increments. The game presents puzzles that involve using various in‑game items such as "Diagnostic Module Enhancers," "cygotes," and "radix capsules." Tasks include actions like running diagnostic tests on a Zeppelin and eliminating computer viruses. The player progresses by identifying objects, determining their functions, and applying them to solve these challenges.

== Development ==
Netzone was developed by Compro Software, a company founded in 1985.

== Reception ==
Reception

Review scores
Publication	Score
Computer Games Magazine	3/5
GameSpot	3.4/10
Online Gaming Review	6/10

Netzone received mixed to negative reviews upon release. Kraig Kujawa of GameSpot rated it a 3.4 out of 10, calling it "a horrific game that is outdated, boring, and frustrating all in one lovely package", and concluding that "Aside from the well-composed, moody CD soundtrack, NET:Zone fails horribly in every area. Doug Radcliffe of Online Gaming Review rated it a 6 out of 10, praising its "interesting storyline" and "well-done" interface but criticizing its "dull puzzles and vague tasks".
