= Silk Worm =

1988 video game

- North American arcade flyer
- Developer: Tecmo (Note: Home computer versions developed by The Sales Curve.)
- Publisher: Tecmo: Home computers Virgin Mastertronic NES Sammy
- Composers: Amiga; Barry Leitch
- Platforms: Arcade, Amiga, Amstrad CPC, Atari ST, Commodore 64, ZX Spectrum, NES
- Release: Arcade: JP/NA: March 1988; Home computers: UK: 1989; NES: NA: June 1990
- Genre: Scrolling shooter
- Modes: Single-player, multiplayer

Silk Worm (Note: Japanese: シルクワーム, Hepburn: Shiruku Wāmu) is a 1988 horizontally scrolling shooter video game developed and published by Tecmo for arcades. In 1989, it was ported to the Amiga, Atari ST, Commodore 64, ZX Spectrum, Amstrad CPC systems by The Sales Curve as Silkworm and released by Virgin Mastertronic. Sammy released a version for the Nintendo Entertainment System in 1990.

Silk Worm inspired the 1991 game SWIV; despite not being a direct sequel, it followed the same core gameplay design of a helicopter/jeep team, albeit as a vertically scrolling shooter instead of a horizontally scrolling one. It was described in several contemporary and retrospective reviews as being "inspired by" and a spiritual successor to Silk Worm.

== Gameplay ==
The player can take control of a jeep mounted with a machine gun or a helicopter mounted with forward and downward firing guns. Two players can work simultaneously and cooperatively against enemies, with one controlling the jeep and the other controlling the helicopter.

Silk Worm features a variety of enemies, some of which have specific weaknesses, such as the armored AA guns that can only be harmed when their shields are down. Enemies include the "Goose" helicopter, a gigantic, heavily armored "mini-boss" helicopter composed of several smaller vehicles connected together.

The players collect shields (which can alternatively be shot by the player in order to destroy all enemies on the screen) and power cells that increase firepower, and an additional bonus can be added to the score achieved. The game becomes more difficult with each level, with more destructible environmental elements, such as buildings and ancient ruins.

The speed is one of the defining parts of the gameplay, which the programmers who worked on the home conversions were keen to preserve, using a variety of programming techniques. Silkworm features a background music theme composed by Barry Leitch, which went on to be included on a Sinclair User covermounted cassette, along with Shinobi and Continental Circus.

== Release ==
Silk Worm was released at a time when scrolling shooters were among the most popular genres. It was released at the same time as Forgotten Worlds, Sanxion, Battle Chopper and DNA Warrior.

The ZX Spectrum version of the game took three months to develop, and was converted from the Amiga version, which was almost identical to the arcade original. The game reached number three on the UK Spectrum sales charts, behind RoboCop and Dragon Ninja.

In November 1990, Virgin Mastertronic re-released Silkworm as part of the Edition 1 compilation, which also included Double Dragon and the shoot 'em ups Gemini Wing and Xenon.

Hamster Corporation released the arcade version as part of their Arcade Archives series for the Nintendo Switch and PlayStation 4 in February 2024.

== Reception ==
Reception

Review scores
Publication	Score
Crash	73%
Computer and Video Games	87%
Sinclair User	86%
Your Sinclair	90%
The Games Machine	77%

Awards
Publication	Award
Your Sinclair	Megagame
Sinclair User	SU Classic

In Japan, Game Machine listed Silk Worm as the fifth most popular table arcade unit of March 1988.

The game was well received. Your Sinclair praised the 2-player mode and the sound effects.

== Legacy ==
The 1991 game SWIV was considered a spiritual successor to Silk Worm, which The Sales Curve had previously converted to home computer formats in 1989. The game's heritage is evident from the game design whereby one player pilots a helicopter, and the other an armoured Jeep. SWIV is not an official sequel, as noted by ex-Sales Curve producer Dan Marchant: "SWIV wasn't really a sequel to Silkworm, but it was certainly inspired by it and several other shoot-'em-ups that we had played and loved."

SWIV was described in the game's manual as meaning both "Special Weapons Intercept Vehicles" and "Silkworm IV".
