= Frantic Flea =

1996 video game

- Developer: Haüs Teknikka
- Publisher: GameTek
- Composer: John Anguish
- Platform: Super NES
- Release: NA: April 1996; EU: 1996
- Genre: Action
- Mode: Single-player

Frantic Flea is an action game developed by Haüs Teknikka and published in 1996 by GameTek for the Super Nintendo Entertainment System.

== Gameplay ==
Frantic Flea is a side-scrolling action platformer game where the player controls a flea looking to liberate their fellow bugs from the Insideos, the game's enemies. The game includes 18 zones, each containing three levels plus a few hidden levels, and three scrolling boss levels.

As the player explores a level, they collect mini-fleas. They must have a certain number of min-fleas for the level's exit to open. Mini-fleas copy all player movements and attacks. Players may also find power-ups in the levels, which are required to traverse some areas.

Players avoid enemies and navigate levels via platforming, utilizing environmental elements when needed. Players can also attack enemies with various moves, and their damage will scale based on the size of their mini-flea following. Receiving damage from enemies or the environment results in losing all mini-fleas. If the player has no mini-fleas, the damage will be applied to their character directly.

== Development and release ==
Andy Whitehurst, creative director of Haüs Teknikka, described the team's approach to the graphics: "What we were trying to show is that despite 16-bit graphical limitations you can actually make a video game look like a cartoon. We wanted FF to look like a '50s or '60s Warner Bros. cartoon and to have the same zany feel, almost Dr. Seuss-like which nobody has tried before in a video game." The game uses more than 250 frames of animation.

== Reception ==
Reception

Review scores
Publication	Score
AllGame	2/5
Electronic Gaming Monthly	7/10, 5/10, 5.5/10, 6/10
Game Informer	5.75/10
GamesMaster	44%
M! Games	62%
Mega Fun	70%
Official Nintendo Magazine	74/100
Super Play	29%
Total!	(UK) 31/100 (DE) 4
Super Power	61%

Frantic Flea received mixed reviews. Three of the four editors for Electronic Gaming Monthly commented that though the game has some innovative features, they are not enough to hold the player's interest. They also criticized that losing all the player's collected fleas each time said player is hit is more frustrating than fun, and that the levels quickly grow repetitive. The remaining reviewer, Ken "Sushi-X" Williams, defended the game, praising its compelling action, graphics, and selection of weapons.

GamePro said the game "puts another nail in the Super NES coffin with uninteresting gameplay, horrible cartoon-like graphics, obnoxious and monotonous music, and annoying, imprecise controls. Basically all you do in this game is run around and collect your little flea buddies." Total! also didn't enjoy Frantic Flea, rating it a 31/100 and critiquing its frustrating gameplay, poor level design leading to being unable to see the platform you need to jump to, and the way the game's difficulty increases. Namely, the game increases the number of environmental hazards rather than offering more challenging enemies, traps, or puzzles.
