= Horizon Chase =

2015 racing video game

- Developer: Aquiris Game Studio
- Publisher: Aquiris Game Studio (Note: PlayStation Vita version was distributed by Play-Asia.)
- Composer: Barry Leitch
- Series: Horizon Chase
- Engine: Unity
- Platforms: iOS; Android; Horizon Chase Turbo; Windows; Linux; PlayStation 4 Nintendo Switch; Xbox One; PlayStation Vita
- Release: World Tour; August 20, 2015; Turbo; Windows, Linux, PlayStation 4, Xbox One: WW: May 15, 2018; Nintendo Switch: WW: November 28, 2018; PlayStation Vita: AS: June 18, 2021
- Genre: Racing
- Mode: Single-player

Horizon Chase is a racing video game developed and published by Brazilian company Aquiris Game Studio. It was originally released on August 20, 2015, for iOS and Android platforms. It is a 3D game inspired by 2D, 16-bit titles like Top Gear and Out Run. Its soundtrack has Nintendocore influences.

On May 15, 2018, an enhanced version, Horizon Chase Turbo, was released for Windows, Linux, PlayStation 4, Nintendo Switch, Xbox One, and PlayStation Vita, the latter via a Play-Asia physical release and one of the last of such for the system.

A sequel, Horizon Chase 2, launched for Apple Arcade on September 6, 2022, with releases for the Microsoft Windows and the Nintendo Switch in 2023. It was also released for PlayStation 4, PlayStation 5, Xbox One and Xbox Series X/S on May 30, 2024.

In April 2026, it was announced that Horizon Chase and Horizon Chase Turbo would be delisted from all digital storefronts on June 1, 2026. This was a result of mass layoffs at Aquiris' parent company Epic Games.

== Gameplay ==
In Horizon Chase, the player has to complete races on tracks located all around the world. There are fuel refills on the track the player has to pick up to continue playing. The player also has to collect coins, as currency, to unlock new tracks. The player can also use nitro boosts to speed up their car. Like a standard race, the player starts every race at the back, and needs to overtake opponents to win. Different weather effects and track types can affect handling and the difficulty of driving.

In the Senna Forever DLC, which also adds a first-person view, players can race Formula One cars in a campaign inspired by Ayrton Senna's career in the sport, with some Grand Prix venues being adapted to the game.

== Development ==
The game's soundtrack was composed by Barry Leitch, who was contacted due to his work on Top Gear, a racing game released in 1992 for the Super Nintendo Entertainment System. The soundtrack of that game was popular among Brazilian fans, leading to a remix contest. The remixes were later released as part of the soundtrack and a cover of the Las Vegas track from Top Gear was added to the game as an easter egg.

All versions of Horizon Chase except the PlayStation Vita also has an Ayrton Senna DLC, with profits being donated to the Ayrton Senna Institute.

== Courses ==
| California | Chile | Brazil | South Africa | Greece | Iceland |
|---|---|---|---|---|---|
| Death Valley | Easter Island | Chapada Diamantina | Cape Town | Meteora | Gulfoss Waterfall |
| San Francisco | Atacama Desert | Brasília | Die Uniegebou | Acropolis | Videy |
| Sequoia National Park | Santiago | Niterói | Blyde River Canyon | Santorini | Reykjavík |
| Los Angeles | Villarrica | Salvador | | | Eyjafjallajökull |
| United Arab Emirates | India | Australia | China | Japan | Hawaii |
| Al Gharbia Qasr | Valley of Flowers | Brighton Beach | Hong Kong | Sapporo | Na Pali Coast |
| Abu Dhabi | Amristar Golden Temple | Uluru | Beijing | Tokyo | Molokini |
| Palm Island | Taj Mahal | Sydney | Great Wall | Kyoto | Honolulu |
| Dubai | Varanasi | | Chengdu | Iya Valley | Kīlauea |
| French Polynesia | Madagascar | Montenegro | | | |
| French Polynesia | Madagascar | Bay of Kotor | | | |

== Reception ==
Reception

Aggregate score
| Aggregator | Score |
|---|---|
| Metacritic | iOS: 88/100; Turbo; PC: 76/100; PS4: 78/100; XONE: 78/100; Switch: 82/100 |

Review score
| Publication | Score |
|---|---|
| TouchArcade | 5/5 |

Horizon Chase received positive reviews, with an aggregate score of 88/100 on Metacritic; Turbo received similarly positive reviews, with the PC scoring 76/100, the PlayStation 4 and Xbox One versions 78/100, and the Nintendo Switch version receiving an 82/100.

Carter Dodson of TouchArcade rated the game 5/5 stars, praising the game's visual style, soundtrack, and controls, and calling it a template for how other developers need to do retro-inspired games. Harry Slater of Pocket Gamer rated the game a 9/10, calling it "a bright and brash arcade racer that looks stunning", while saying that its gameplay is good enough to back up its presentation. He noted that the game got "a little grindy at times", though calling it "the type of grind you're happy to wade through". The site awarded the game the "Gold" award. Tom Christiansen of Gamezebo rated the game 3.5/5 stars, calling the visuals "solid" and praising the soundtrack, but saying he disliked the auto-turn assist system that was impossible to turn off, also calling the AI "impossibly fast" and unlocking new cars overly difficult.
