= Stratego (video game) =

1990 video game

- Developer: Accolade
- Publisher: Accolade
- Composer: Barry Leitch
- Platforms: Amiga, MS-DOS
- Release: 1990

Stratego is a video game published in 1990 by Accolade. It is a computer version of the Stratego board game presented as a one-player strategy game.

== Gameplay ==
This adaptation allows the player to choose different designs for the playing pieces and game board. Three alternate boards and one alternate set of pieces are available, and the game does not allow players to design their own.

The game includes an option to play a demo game to show players how to play on the computer. The game only allows a single human player to play against the computer, with no multiplayer option. The game includes five levels of skill, ranging from sergeant to field marshal. The game also includes multiple optional rules, such as using an aggressor advantage (attacking piece wins in a tie rather than mutual destruction), silent defense (defending piece does not get revealed on an unsuccessful attack), and rescue (allows a captured piece to be reintroduced when one player's unit lands on the opponent's end of the board).

== Reception ==
Reception

Review score
Publication	Score
Los Angeles Times	4/5

Alan Emrich reviewed the game for Computer Gaming World, and stated that the game "remains an extremely challenging solitaire game of remarkable diversity and subtlety" and credited the supplement to the rules and the artificial intelligence opponent.

Tom Malcom for .info rated the game 3 stars and recommended the game, but suggested that fans should be prepared to be somewhat disappointed.

Ian Wrigley for Amiga Format rated the game 81% and stated that while the game remains the same as the board game, "some of the strategic twists it throws are sweet, if costly to your side".

Zzap! rated the game 76% overall and stated that the game would demand the full attention of players and that intelligent players should give it a try.

Colin Campbell for Amiga Power rated the game 52% and felt that the board game was trapped by its own design but cautioned that Accolade should have realized this before deciding to adapt it into a computer game.

Arnie Katz for VideoGames & Computer Entertainment gave the game 9 out of 10 overall and stated that even without elements like multiple perspectives and animations found in adaptations of strategy board games like chess, "the computerized Stratego is an outstanding electronic board game."

Jonathan Turner for Strategy Plus recommended Stratego to inexperienced players, or players looking for a strategic challenge that was not too difficult, but that expert players may find it too easy.
