= GameTek =

American video game publisher

- Formerly: I.J.E., Inc. (1977-1993); Gabco, Inc. (1987-1993)
- Type: Private
- Industry: Video games
- Founded: 1977; 49 years ago (as I.J.E. Distributing, Inc.); 1987; 39 years ago (as Gabco, Inc.)
- Founder: Irwin H. Schwartz
- Defunct: 1998
- Fate: Filed for Chapter 11 bankruptcy, assets split into Philips and Take-Two Interactive
- Headquarters: North Miami Beach, Florida, United States
- Divisions: GameTek (FL), Inc. CyberSoft

GameTek was an American video game publisher based in North Miami Beach, Florida, known for publishing video game adaptations of game shows in the late 1980s and early 1990s. GameTek was a trade name for I.J.E., the owner of electronic publishing rights to Jeopardy! and Wheel of Fortune.

== History ==
=== Origins ===
I.J.E. was initially established in 1977 by Jerry Weiner and Irwin H. Schwartz of Disneyland Records under the name I.J.E. Distributing, Inc. to distribute pre-recorded children's entertainment products under the trade name "Kid Stuff." From 1977 to 1985 I.J.E. and its affiliated acquired a number of licenses to develop entertainment products based upon certain television shows, sports entities and name brand children's products.

=== Expansion into video gaming ===
In 1983, the company entered the video game business, when I.J.E. founded a video game company The Great Game Company, to adapt television game shows for the home video game market, with the first seven games being Family Feud, Wheel of Fortune, Jeopardy!, The Price Is Right, Password, The Joker's Wild and Tic-Tac-Dough, with an eighth, The $25,000 Pyramid being added later on. The video game label eventually collapsed before releasing any games due to the 1983 video game crash.

I.J.E.'s original founder Irwin H. Schwartz sold I.J.E. to an unaffiliated third party in 1985 and then formed Gabco, Inc. in 1987 to reacquire I.J.E. GameTek was founded as a result to exploit these licenses in the software market.

Originally, I.J.E. licensed these titles to ShareData of Chandler, Arizona for major game show titles like Wheel of Fortune, Classic Concentration and Jeopardy! and Box Office of St. Paul, Minnesota for lesser-known titles like The $100,000 Pyramid and High Rollers; however, when I.J.E. saw ShareData's success with the titles, I.J.E. decided to publish the titles themselves, resulting in the founding of GameTek.

The company was award a Nintendo license in late 1987, and granted the license to five titles Wheel of Fortune, Jeopardy!, Hollywood Squares, The Price Is Right and Password. In 1988, when it was clear that the company was delaying its game show titles, the company introduced the KidTek label, was used for Milton Bradley Company game licenses and acquiring the rights to the game show Double Dare. The company then acquired the rights to Fisher-Price titles to go beyond its game show licenses.

=== Further expansion ===
After establishing distribution for the game show titles, GameTek expanded by licensing European titles for the North American market, including Frontier: Elite II and The Humans. In 1991, it attempted to launch the InfoGenius Systems franchise for the Game Boy. The company expanded into the UK market in 1993. Also in 1993, the company entered into a publishing partnership with Konami, in order that GameTek handled distribution of Konami's PC titles.

In October 1993 the company changed its name to GameTek (FL), Inc. and Gabco, Inc. became GameTek, Inc. In 1994, the company launched a new label, Cybersoft, used to circumvent game limits on Nintendo publishing. In July 1994, the company partnered with upstart Take-Two Interactive Software to publish five titles worldwide. The company then regrouped its development studios in London and Miami into Alternative Reality Technologies. In February 1995, after the success, the company acquired a stake in Take-Two Interactive Software, aligning it with its in-house Alternative Reality Technologies.

On March 9, 1995, the company acquired Imagexcel and reformed the Canadian studio as a unit of its in-house development studio Alternative Reality Technologies. Kevin Hoare, Ed Zolnieryk, Greg Bick, and Ray Larabie, both Imagexcel members formed the core of GameTek's Canadian development operations. After the acquisition, the former Imagexcel studio was also referred to as GameTek Canada. In 1995, the company, through Alternative Reality Technologies, made a deal to purchase game developer Malibu Interactive from Malibu Comics and renamed to Padded Cell Studios.

=== Downfall and closure ===
In 1996, GameTek scaled down its publishing activities, turning most of that aspect of its business over to Philips. Philips' interactive unit subsequently went defunct in 1997, leaving the company's future in limbo. GameTek filed for Chapter 11 bankruptcy on December 3, 1997, citing development delays and disappointing sales; mainly from the title Robotech: Crystal Dreams; the publisher went out of business in July 1998.

Most of the company's assets, including the Alternative Reality Technologies studios, were acquired by Take-Two Interactive in 1997. Also, the Padded Cell Studios studio was sold to Interplay, who acquired publishing rights to Jimmy Johnson Football, and it was named V.R.T.O. before going under in 1998.

== Cybersoft ==
Cybersoft, Inc.
- Industry: Video games
- Headquarters: United States
- Owner: GameTek

Cybersoft, Inc. was an American video game publisher, which was a subsidiary of GameTek. It was designed to publish games for the Super Nintendo Entertainment System. The GameTek name would be used on Sega Genesis titles, in a similar structure to THQ, with Malibu Games, and Acclaim Entertainment with their LJN label.

The label was first used in Winter CES 1994 by GameTek, with the technological 3D title Spectre was its debut title. The label was only used on North American releases for the SNES. The company followed it up with Adventures of Yogi Bear for the SNES, which was based on the cartoon Yogi Bear by Hanna-Barbera Productions. The company then moved to the racing game genre with Full Throttle: All-American Racing (originally developed as Full Out Racing).

These games were released by Cybersoft:

- Adventures of Yogi Bear (1994)
- Air Cavalry (1995)
- Brutal: Paws of Fury (1994)
- Carrier Aces (1995)
- Full Throttle: All-American Racing (1995)
- Spectre VR (1994)

== Games ==
- AYSO Soccer '97
- Wheel of Fortune
- Wheel of Fortune arcade game (1989, Developed by Incredible Technologies)
- Double Dare
- Hollywood Squares
- Jeopardy!
- Jeopardy! Sports Edition
- Press Your Luck
- Quarantine
- Quarantine II: Road Warrior
- Family Feud
- American Gladiators (Developed by Incredible Technologies)
- Frontier: Elite II
- Alien Incident (European Version)
- Cyberbykes: Shadow Racer VR
- The Humans
- Gadget Twins
- Brutal: Paws of Fury
- Brutal Unleashed: Above the Claw
- Star Crusader (European version)
- Valkyrie (for Macintosh)
- Nomad
- Robotech: Crystal Dreams (Cancelled)
- Super Password
- Super Street Fighter II Turbo (MS-DOS Version)
- Frontier: First Encounters
- Frantic Flea
- NET:Zone
- Daemon's Gate: Volume One, Dorovan's Key
- Tarzan: Lord of the Jungle
- Classic Concentration
- The Price Is Right
- Nigel Mansell's World Championship Racing
- Now You See It
- Race Days
- Yogi Bear's Gold Rush (Cancelled for Game Gear)
- Full Throttle: All-American Racing
- Zool (Console and Handheld Versions)
- Micro Machines 2: Turbo Tournament (MS-DOS Version)
- Pinball Dreams (SNES, Game Boy and Game Gear Versions)
- Pinball Fantasies (SNES and Game Boy Versions)
- Pinball Mania (Game Boy Version Exclusive to Europe)
- Fisher-Price: Firehouse Rescue
- Fisher-Price: I Can Remember
- Fisher-Price: Perfect Fit

== See also ==
- Cybersoft (video game company) (GameTek subsidiary)
- Kid Stuff Records
