= Gadget Twins =

1992 video game

- Developer: Imagitec Design
- Publisher: GameTek
- Composer: Barry Leitch
- Platform: Sega Genesis
- Release: NA: October 1992
- Genre: Action
- Modes: Single player, multiplayer

Gadget Twins is a video game developed by Imagitec Design for the Sega Genesis and published by GameTek in 1992. Gadget Twins is a horizontal side scroller action game that supports both single and two-player gameplay.

== Gameplay ==
The plot of Gadget Twins focuses on a magic gem stolen from the king's throne room in Gadget Land. The king summons Bop and Bump, the Gadget Twins, to recover the gem. The characters are red and blue airplanes. In single player mode, the player controls Bop, and Bump is controlled by the second player when in two player mode. Two player mode allows players to attack each other and steal the other player's weapons and coins.

Gameplay consists of flying the player characters through horizontal side scrolling air or water levels, with 6 levels in total. Defeating enemies earns coins, which can be used to purchase additional weapons. The player's plane starts with an extendable boxing glove that can punch in four directions around the player character. Up to 10 different weapons can be purchased but only 4 can be equipped at a single time, allowing the player to optimize across each level.

== Development and release ==
Gadget Twins was developed by Imagitec Design and released by GameTek for the Sega Genesis in 1992. Video game composer Barry Leitch wrote the game's music. An Amiga version of the game was developed but never released.

== Reception ==
Reviews of Gadget Twins were mixed. Mega Play stated the game "[held] its own", calling it both "cute" and "comical". Mega Drive Advanced Gaming was quite critical, ranking the entire game as a "downer". Mega found the game different from the offerings of the time, calling it a "pleasant and whimsical change from blasting the hell out of a bunch of ugly aliens".

The gameplay itself was likened to that of Super Mario Bros or Sonic the Hedgehog and was praised for the smoothness of its animation and "cartoony" graphics.
