= Imagitec Design =

British video game company

Imagitec Design was a video games development company founded in 1989, based in the UK. The main person involved was Barry Leitch, who worked as a composer for many of the company's soundtracks.

Imagitec Design interacted with other companies such as Atari Corporation, Gremlin Interactive, and Electronic Arts. In early 1997 Imagitec was purchased by Gremlin and became part of Gremlin Interactive Studios.

== Games ==
- American Gladiators
- Butcher Hill
- Blood Valley
- Bubsy in Fractured Furry Tales
- Combo Racer
- Daemonsgate
- Dwagons - Unreleased Mega Drive game
- Ferrari Formula One
- Freelancer 2120 - Unreleased Atari Jaguar CD game
- Gadget Twins
- Gemini Wing
- The Humans
- I-War
- Netherworld
- Prophecy I - The Viking Child
- Raiden
- Ratpack
- Snow White: Happily Ever After
- Space Junk - Unfinished Atari Falcon game
- Stratego
- Suspicious Cargo
- Tempest 2000
- TNN Outdoors Bass Tournament '96
- Viking Child
- Wheel of Fortune: Featuring Vanna White
- Zone Warrior
