= Brutal: Paws of Fury =

1994 video game

- Developers: GameTek; Eurocom (SNES)
- Publisher: GameTek
- Platforms: Sega CD, Super NES, Genesis, Amiga, CD32, MS-DOS, 32X
- Release: September 1994: Sega CD; EU: September 1994; NA: 1994 Genesis; EU: 1994; NA: 1994 SNES; NA: December 6, 1994; EU: 1994; JP: December 22, 1994 Amiga; EU: 1995 CD32; EU: 1995 MS-DOS; EU: June 1995; NA: 1995 32X; NA: March 1995
- Genre: Fighting
- Modes: Single-player, multiplayer

Brutal: Paws of Fury (Titled Paws of Fury in Germany) is a 1994 fighting game developed and published by GameTek. The game features a cast of various anthropomorphic animals as selectable fighters. It also features the ability to learn new attacks and save them via passwords. Originally a Sega CD exclusive, it was later ported to other game consoles.

Brutal: Paws of Fury was published in 1994 by GameTek in Europe, Cybersoft in North America, and Kemco in Japan. The game was released for the Sega CD, Amiga, CD32, Genesis, and Super Nintendo Entertainment System. An updated version, Brutal Unleashed: Above the Claw (also titled Brutal: Above the Claw), was released for the Sega 32X and MS-DOS compatible computers in 1995 with two new playable characters, new arenas, a remixed intro, and new music. The general content and gameplay mechanics remained constant throughout all incarnations. Reviews for the game were mixed, with praise for the graphics, soundtrack, and gameplay innovations, but criticism for the sluggish play and controls.

== Plot ==
=== Brutal: Paws of Fury ===
Every four years on the uncharted Brutal Island, the world's toughest martial artists are invited to compete in the most grueling tournament, aptly referred to as the Brutal Island Tournament. Only the winner of this tournament gains the privilege to challenge Dali Llama, the greatest fighter in the world, for the coveted Belt of Heaven championship.

=== Brutal Unleashed: Above the Claw ===
Four years after the Paws of Fury tournament, the participants return to Brutal Island to once again compete for the match against Dali Llama for the Belt of Heaven. The tournament is also Dali Llama's way of "testing" the warriors, judging whom among them possess the deepest "warrior's spirit."

== Characters ==
All of the characters in the game are anthropomorphic animals. The original Brutal: Paws of Fury includes:

- Kung-Fu Bunny – A rabbit monk.
- Prince Leon of Kenya – A lion rock star, who has an undisclosed vendetta with Tai Cheetah and Kendo Coyote.
- Rhei Rat – A rat who is an accomplished and arrogant Thai boxer.
- Tai Cheetah – A cheetah who is mentoring Kendo Coyote.
- Kendo Coyote – A coyote who is motivated by greed, an estranged pupil of Tai Cheetah.
- Foxy Roxy – A lycra-wearing vixen who is a politician and social activist.
- Ivan the Bear – A bear who is an ex-Soviet commando and claims to be the strongest animal in the world.
- The Pantha – A panther who is a member of a sinister cult.
- Karate Croc – A crocodile bar brawler.
- Dali Llama – A llama who is currently the holder of the Belt of Heaven championship.

Notes: Karate Croc and Dali Llama are only playable by means of inputting a secret button sequence. Also, The Pantha and Karate Croc are absent from the 16-bit versions of the game.

Brutal Unleashed: Above the Claw introduces two additional characters:

- Chung Poe – A mole who transforms into an anthropomorphic bat-dragon hybrid during battle.
- Psycho Kitty – A cat who apparently suffers from hyperactivity.

== Development ==
The Amiga port of Brutal: Paws of Fury is a straight port of the Genesis/Mega Drive version. Despite the Amiga's smaller memory, the Amiga version includes the two characters from the Sega CD version which the Genesis/Mega Drive version had to drop, Pantha and Croc. This was possible due to new compression techniques for the Amiga and the exclusion of the left-facing character sprites from the disk; the left-facing sprites are instead created while the software is running by flipping the right-facing sprites. In the Genesis/Mega Drive version, each character has its own 16-colour palette. Since the Amiga cannot easily accomplish this, the Amiga version instead uses one palette for all the characters.

Since the Amiga version is controlled by a single-button joystick, the three different attack strengths (weak, medium, and hard) are determined by how long the button is held down before being released, and special moves are more joystick-based.

== Reception ==
Reception

Review scores
Publication	Score
Electronic Gaming Monthly	7/10, 7/10, 5/10, 7/10 (SNES); 6.5/10, 6.5/10, 6.5/10, 6/10 (Sega 32X); 6.25/10 (Sega CD); 7/10, 6/10, 5/10, 6/10, 6/10 (Genesis)
Next Generation	3/5 (SNES, MS-DOS & Sega 32X)
The One	69% (Amiga)

Electronic Gaming Monthly praised the music and the cinemas as stunning and among the best seen on the Sega CD, and also approved of the mechanic of learning special moves. However, they criticized the gameplay action as sluggish and unresponsive. GamePro commented that the game "tries a few new things", but shared EGM's stance that the Sega CD version plays too slow, and also criticized that the way the backgrounds often block the view of the action, while intentional, is unduly frustrating.

Reviewing the Super NES and Genesis versions, though Electronic Gaming Monthly again praised the idea of learning special moves, some of their reviewers commented that this mechanic ultimately makes the game less exciting rather than more, and all of them remarked that the controls are weak. GamePro, in contrast, remarked that the controls of the Super NES and Genesis versions are greatly improved from the Sega CD original, and that the action is much faster and more responsive in these versions as well. Though they noted that some of the Sega CD version's content was cut and that the view-blocking backgrounds are still a problem, they gave both versions an overall positive recommendation. Next Generation agreed that the Super NES version was a notable improvement over the Sega CD original, particularly the "rich, shaded backgrounds". They further remarked that "The gameplay is fine, although the character control is delayed, and special moves are tricky."

GamePro gave the 32X version a positive review. They remarked that the game can be unfairly difficult, but praised the graphics, lack of slowdown, unique and enjoyable music, and the use of real life martial arts techniques and philosophies. Though the reviewers of Electronic Gaming Monthly concurred that the 32X version has far better graphics and sound than previous versions, they contended that this is irrelevant since it still suffers from the same shallow and sluggish gameplay and mediocre controls. Next Generation disagreed, stating that "New animation, a pumping techno soundtrack, and four additional characters ... infuse enough fresh blood to make this new game really shine." They further praised the game's uniqueness and said its only problem was that it is possible to win most fights by using one kick or punch over and over.

Next Generation reviewed the PC version of the game, and stated that "Brutal is a solid fighting game that should please any fan of the genre. If you don't need to see blood and gore to be entertained, check it out."

The One gave the Amiga version of Brutal an overall score of 69%, stating it "looks stunning but unfortunately it is all let down by the severe lack of gameplay. The fighting isn't as fluid as [other fighting games], and instead of blending quick reactions with simple joystick combinations it all ends up with you frantically waggling the stick without much thought or skill involved at all ... Brutal is superbly presented but leaves you with the feeling that something is lacking ... a match can be won simply by repeating the same moves over and over again."

== See also ==
- List of fighting games
