= Snow White: Happily Ever After (video game) =

1994 video game

- Cover art
- Developer: Imagitec Design
- Publisher: ASC Games
- Programmers: Steve Oldacre; Paul Proctor
- Artists: Marie Fox; Peter Goldsmith; Richard Lodge
- Composer: Ian Howe
- Platform: Super NES
- Release: NA: October 1994
- Genre: Action
- Mode: Single-player

Snow White: Happily Ever After is a North America-exclusive video game that was released in 1994 for the Super Nintendo Entertainment System. The game was targeted for female video game players. It is based on the 1989 animated Filmation film Happily Ever After, and not the 1937 Disney film. A Sega Genesis version was planned but never released.

== Plot ==
Snow White is fighting her evil step-uncle Maliss using "fruit bombs".

Players follow the continuation of Snow White after the death of her stepmother, the Evil Queen.The Queen's wizard brother Lord Maliss has vowed vengeance and changes Snow White's Prince Charming into a "Shadow Man" humanoid. An entire kingdom must also be freed from Maliss' sorcery. Players can play as either Snow White or her "Shadow Man" protector.

== Gameplay ==
Fruit and stars can be collected while apples can be thrown at enemies and blocks.Players are given four continues to stop the evil Maliss. At the final stage, either Snow White or the Shadow Man confronts Maliss in his ultimate dragon form. Players can change the difficulty level (ranging from easy to medium to hard) if the game gets too frustrating for them. A vast array of continues allow players to restart failed games.
