= Family Feud (video game series) =

- First release: January 1, 1987
- Latest release: Family Feud; 2020

Family Feud
- Publisher: ShareData
- Platforms: Apple II, Commodore 64
- Release: Apple II: NA: January 1, 1987; Commodore 64: NA: 1987

Family Feud is a video game series based on the Family Feud TV game show. It began with ShareData's 1987 release on the Apple II and Commodore 64 consoles. In 1990, GameTek released a version on the Nintendo Entertainment System. GameTek later released four more Feud games for the Super NES, Sega Genesis, 3DO, and MS-DOS between 1993 and 1995. Hasbro Interactive, Global Star and Ubisoft have also released versions starting in 2000.

== ShareData versions ==
ShareData released the first video game versions of the game show in 1987 on the Apple II and Commodore 64, with two versions of the packaging: one shows a drawing of a just completed round (using the Milton Bradley home game art design) and another shows a full shot of the set from the first Richard Dawson era. The game plays like the Dawson era (with the look similar to the 1976 - 1985 era) with (2 Single rounds, 1 Double Round, and 1 Triple Round - with 300 point rules and Fast Money Win of $10,000).

Later in 1989, ShareData released "The All New Family Feud" on PC, Apple, C64 with rules, gameplay and look based on the Ray Combs era.

== GameTek versions gameplay ==
Family Feud
- Developers: NES; Beam Software; Genesis & 3DO; Eurocom; SNES; Imagineering
- Publisher: GameTek
- Composers: NES; Tania Smith
- Platforms: Nintendo Entertainment System, Sega Genesis, SNES, 3DO
- Release: NES: NA: May 1991; Genesis & SNES: NA: 1993; 3DO: NA: 1994

=== NES ===
Family Feud for the NES recreated the appearance and feel of the original series as hosted by Richard Dawson, included a lookalike host that would kiss female characters. (The packaging for the game instead showed the set used when Ray Combs was the host.) One player or two players were able to play at a time.

Just as in the show, players needed to gives answers for survey questions that were asked of 100 people. Players giving correct answers earned money, needing $200 to win the game and play Fast Money to win $5,000 by getting 200 points or more. Unsuccessful players of Fast Money won $5 per point.

Players entered answers by scrolling through the alphabet using the controller, finding the letters in a string displayed across the lower part of the screen, with a time limit to give each answer. The game accepted reasonable similes for correct answers, and recognized slight misspellings.

Winning players could choose between the option to stop playing orcontinue on, and a champion automatically retires after winning more $20,000 before being defeated.

When a computer-controlled is the winner, the Fast Money is omitted and the game gives as excuse such as "tax considerations" or "a birth in the family". This is a carry-over from the ShareData versions of the game.

=== SNES/Genesis and 3DO/PC ===
The versions that followed used the Combs set, with the SNES and Genesis version using a host resembling Combs and the 3DO and PC versions featuring a host resembling Dawson (as he had returned to the series by this point).

The later versions also added options to where a player could play a game without facing an opponent and whether or not they wanted to play the Bullseye Round, which had been added to the show in 1992 and was included in each of the later releases. The Bullseye Round was played as it was during the last two seasons of the Combs Feud, where a $5,000 starting bank was used and up to $15,000 could be added depending on how many questions a team answered correctly.

The later version games played for points instead of dollars, with 300 winning the game. After a win, a player received a code to use if they wanted to stop playing but pick up where they left off. Five wins meant automatic retirement regardless of how much money a player won.

Next Generation reviewed the 3DO version of the game, rating it three stars out of five, and stated that "It's a blast if you have a bunch of folks with whom to play, however, in the final analysis, whether or not you like it probably depends on whether or not you like the television show."

=== Reviews ===
SNES:

- Questicle.net (Dec, 2011)
- All Game Guide (1998)
- Game Freaks 365 (Nov 01, 2007)
- The Game Hoard (Jun 30, 2020)
- Just Games Retro (Dec 13, 2001)
- NES Center (2001)

Genesis/SNES:

- All Game Guide (1998)
- Sega-16.com (Oct 08, 2006)

3DO:

- The Video Game Critic (Jun 08, 2016)
- Coming Soon Magazine (Jan, 1995)
- 3DO Magazine (UK) (Feb, 1995)

== Hasbro, Global Star, and Ubisoft versions ==
Family Feud
- Developer: Artech Studios
- Publishers: Hasbro Interactive; Infogrames (UK)
- Platforms: PC, PlayStation
- Release: PC: NA: 2000; UK: November 2001; PlayStation: NA: October 16, 2000

In 2000, Family Feud was released for the PlayStation and PC by Hasbro Interactive to accompany the show's 1999 revival helmed by comedian Louie Anderson. Anderson is included in the game as host and appears as a full-motion video character. The game focuses on faithfully reproducing the production and rules of the actual game show. The IBM PC version also features the ability to upload portraits of one's face and place it in a three-dimensional animated body.

The PC version would later be released in the United Kingdom in 2001 under the show's UK name Family Fortunes. The only differences between the two are that Family Feud host Louie Anderson is replaced with then-Family Fortunes host Les Dennis, and the graphics have been changed to resemble the Family Fortunes set used at the time of the game's release.

Family Feud
- Developers: PlayStation 2 Ingram; Game Boy Advance; Atomic Planet
- Publisher: Global Star Software
- Platforms: PlayStation 2, Game Boy Advance
- Release: NA: October 12, 2006

In 2006, Global Star versions for the PlayStation 2, PC and Game Boy Advance were made. Although the box art uses the 2006–2007 season's logo (the first time it was publicly seen before John O'Hurley was announced as host), the first set design in the game is from the 2005–2006 season (Richard Karn's final year). The player can unlock sets from Feud's previous incarnations, including the original 1976–85 run, the 1988–94 revival, the 1994–95 set that accompanied Richard Dawson's return, and the 1999–2002 set from Louie Anderson's tenure. Well-known game show host Todd Newton does the voiceover in addition to hosting the game.

Family Feud
- Developer: Ludia
- Publisher: Ubisoft
- Platforms: Wii, Nintendo DS, PC
- Release: NA: September 29, 2009

In 2009, Ubisoft released Family Feud 2010 Edition for the Wii, Nintendo DS and PC. The game uses the 2009 set and features customizable family avatars plus a predictive text input tool for faster answers. In a unique twist, the Wii version requires players to swing the Wii Remote down to hit the buzzer during Face-Offs. The game uses four-member families (much like the 1994–1995 season) as opposed to the usual five; like Ubisoft's Price Is Right video game, there is no host featured – all voiceover work is done by Terence McGovern.

In 2010, Ubisoft released Family Feud Decades for the Wii. The game uses sets and survey questions from the past four decades, using the 1976, 1988, 1999, and 2009 sets. Family Feud 2012 was released in 2011. In 2020, Ubisoft published a game simply called Family Feud, made by independent game studio, Snap Finger Click, for PlayStation 4, Xbox One, Xbox Series X/S, Nintendo Switch, and Stadia.

=== Reviews ===
Hasbro:

- IGN (Oct 30, 2000)
- PSX Nation (Jan 18, 2001)
- All Game Guide (2000)
- IGN (Dec 01, 2000)

Global Star:

- IGN (Nov 02, 2006)

Ubisoft:

- Game industry News (GiN) (Dec 02, 2009)
- GameZone (Oct 18, 2009)
- gamrReview (Dec 01, 2009)
- IGN (Jul 07, 2010)

During the 14th Annual Interactive Achievement Awards, the Academy of Interactive Arts & Sciences nominated Family Feud for "Social Networking Game of the Year".

== Other games ==
Family Feud
- Publisher: Mobliss
- Platform: Mobile phone
- Release: NA: July 2, 2003

Seattle-based Mobliss Inc. also released a mobile version of Family Feud that was available on Sprint, Verizon and Cingular.

Family Feud 2012 Edition
- Developer: Ubisoft
- Publisher: Ubisoft
- Platforms: Wii, Xbox 360
- Release: NA: October 18, 2011

In October 2008, Glu Mobile released a mobile video game version of Family Feud.

Family Feud
- Developer: Snap Finger Click
- Publisher: Ubisoft
- Platforms: PlayStation 4, Xbox One, Nintendo Switch, Stadia
- Release: WW: November 12, 2020
