= Yogi Bear's Gold Rush =

1994 video game

- North American cover art
- Developer: Twilight
- Publishers: NA: GameTek; EU: Empire Interactive
- Designers: Stuart Cook; Robin Holman; Wayne Billingham
- Programmer: Robin Holman
- Artist: Wayne Billingham
- Composers: Martin Walker (Game Boy); Dark Technologies (Kevin Bateson, Jez Taylor) (Game Gear)
- Platform: Game Boy
- Release: NA: October 1994; EU: November 24, 1994
- Genre: Platforming
- Mode: Single-player

Yogi Bear's Gold Rush is a 1994 2D platform game developed by British studio Twilight for the Game Boy.

== Summary ==
Yogi Bear has to save Jellystone National Park from an evil ghost named Jake; who stole the funds needed to keep the park operating. There are six different stages in the game that range from a large city to the Wild West. There are no-powerups in the traditional sense; players must collect 100 picnic baskets for an extra life. Hidden doors and areas must be found in order to crack open the safes. Once inside a safe, Yogi must collect 25 gold coins to make a bar. In order to unlock the best ending, Yogi needs to convert 300 gold coins into 12 gold bars that will provide the park with the money to continue operations.

The player has the ability to jump on most enemies to kill them. Some enemies must be left alone due to the lack of ability to wield a weapon. Falling down into bottomless pits or navigating into dangerous hazards will cause Yogi to lose a life. By default, the player gets three lives and one additional continue.

== Reception ==
Reception

Review scores
Publication	Score
AllGame	2.5/5
Electronic Gaming Monthly	8/10, 5/10, 3/10, 6/10

GamePro rated the game as an inoffensive but unimpressive Super Mario clone, though they did praise the developers for creating an entirely new Yogi Bear game instead of a standard down-port of the SNES game Adventures of Yogi Bear (which was released almost simultaneously with Yogi Bear's Gold Rush). Among the four reviewers of Electronic Gaming Monthly, all but one of them commented that Yogi Bear's Gold Rush is a generic platformer with levels lacking in both challenge and originality. Power Unlimited gave the game a review score of 75% writing: "The Game Boy version requires more skill than the SNES version of the same name, but once you understand the controls, the game can be played smoothly. Too smooth - because the game is very short for those who are used to Mario and Sonic games." Brett Alan Weiss of Allgame gave the game a 2.5 out 5 rating, calling it "standard side-scrolling platform fare, borrowing heavily from the Super Mario Bros. series of games."
