= Cyberbykes: Shadow Racer VR =

1995 video game

- Developer: Artificial Software
- Publisher: GameTek
- Platform: MS-DOS
- Release: 1995
- Genre: Racing game
- Modes: Single-player, multiplayer

Cyberbykes: Shadow Racer VR is a 1995 motorcycle racing game developed by Artificial Software and published by GameTek.

== Plot ==
Cyberbykes is a futuristic motorcycle racing game with car combat elements. It takes place in a dystopian future wherein a group called the World Treaty Organization (WTO) has gained power throughout the world, stockpiling weapons in the process. The player combats the WTO with an armed "cyberbyke" vehicle.

== Reception ==
Reception

Review scores
Publication	Score
PC Gamer (US)	57%
PC Zone	10/100
Computer Game Review	72/46/66

In PC Gamer US, Steve Poole offered Cyberbykes a negative review, writing, "The single-player game is a bust, and there are plenty of games with network support that are more fun than this." Computer Game Review was similarly negative: the game has "not one shred of originality in game play, design or plot," the reviewers said. Writing for Computer Gaming World, Peter Olafson compared the game unfavorably to other racing titles on the market, and called it "rather woeful and dated". PC Zone's Charlton Brooker was harsher still, giving the game a "Pants" award and calling it "horrid".
