= Full Throttle: All-American Racing =

1994 video game

- North American cover art
- Developer: Gremlin Interactive
- Publishers: JP: Coconuts Japan; NA: Cybersoft; EU: GameTek
- Composer: Neil Biggin
- Platform: Super NES
- Release: JP: December 16, 1994; NA: January, 1995; EU: 1994
- Genre: Racing
- Modes: Single-player, multiplayer

Full Throttle: All-American Racing, known in Japan as Full Power (フル・パワー), is a racing video game released in 1994 by Gremlin Interactive for the SNES. In Japan, it was published by Coconuts Japan, in North America by Cybersoft, and in Europe by GameTek. In April 2021, it was released as part of Piko Interactive Collection 2 for the Evercade by Blaze Entertainment.

== Gameplay ==
Players can race using motorcycles or waterscooters. Places visited in the game include the Appalachian Mountains, San Francisco's elaborate streets, and Arizona's flat wasteland deserts.

An unusual aspect of the game was that the player has the choice between playing the game with music only, or sound effects only. It is not possible to play the game with both at the same time.

== Development ==
The game was initially developed and previewed under the title Full Out Racing; however, its name was changed at the last minute. The game was published by GameTek under the Cybersoft label.

== Reception ==
In their review, GamePro described Full Throttle: All-American Racing as a thoroughly average racer, with derivative gameplay and so-so controls, graphics, music, and sound effects.
