= Carrier Aces =

1995 video game

- North American cover art
- Developer(s): Synergistic Software, Inc.
- Publisher(s): JP: Yumedia; NA: Cybersoft; EU: GameTek
- Director(s): Robert C. Clardy
- Designer(s): Michael Ormsby; Steve Coleman; Kirt Lemons
- Artist(s): Kirt Lemons; Jeremy Jones; Mike McMillen; Linda Westerfield
- Composer(s): Christopher Barker
- Platform(s): Super NES
- Release: NA: January 1995; EU: 1995; JP: July 28, 1995
- Genre(s): Action simulator
- Mode(s): Single player

Carrier Aces (キャリアエース; "Carrier Aces") is a flight simulation game released for the Super Nintendo Entertainment System in 1995.

== Gameplay ==
Players control an aircraft pilot of either the United States or the Japanese naval aviations during World War II. Based aboard an aircraft carrier, players can do numerous missions in an effort to help the war effort. Campaign modes allow for all aircraft to have their own statistics and allow players to carry certain types of aircraft into the combat zone.

All aircraft come equipped with a throttle, a speedometer, an altimeter, a compass, and a fuel tank.

== Reception ==
Reception

Review scores
| Publication | Score |
|---|---|
| Electronic Gaming Monthly | 6.4/10 |
| Famitsu | 18/40 |
| M! Games | 60% |
| Mega Fun | 51% |
| Nintendo Power | 3.25/5 (Note: Nintendo Power gave Carrier Aces two 3.4/5 scores for graphics/sound and challenge, 2.9/5 for play control, and 3.3/5 for theme/fun.) |
| Super Play | 39% |
| Total! | 45/100 |
| Video Games (DE) | 58% |

On release, Famicom Tsūshin scored the game an 18 out of 40. Electronic Gaming Monthly gave it a 6.4 out of 10, commenting that "Carrier Aces does a great job of putting you in the cockpit of a classic fighter, and the strategy and two-player elements are a nice touch." GamePro praised the game for its variety of missions, well-balanced split screen, and engaging sounds, though they complained that the dogfighting is too difficult.
