= Butcher Hill =

1989 video game

- Developer: Imagitec Design
- Publisher: Gremlin Graphics
- Designers: Steph, Blizard, Andy
- Platforms: Amiga, Amstrad CPC, Atari ST, Commodore 64, ZX Spectrum
- Release: April 1989
- Genre: Action
- Mode: Single-player

Butcher Hill is an action game developed by Imagitec Design and published by Gremlin Graphics in 1989. In this game, the player controls a team of five soldiers who have to survive in the Vietnamese jungle and kill as many enemies as possible. In the first part, the player is in a boat on a river with rocks, mines and enemy fighters trying to sink it. If there is at least one remaining soldier at the end of the first part, the player enters the second part, a simulated 3D view of the jungle, shooting enemy soldiers and evading mines.

== Reception ==
Screenshot

Screenshot

The Spanish magazine Microhobby gave the game the following scores: Originality: 40%, Graphics: 70%, Motion: 60%, Sound: 70%, Difficulty: 80%, Addiction: 60%.
