= Online Gaming Review =

Video game website

- Website type: Gaming website
- Available in: English
- Website: www.ogr.com
- Launched: December 1, 1995
- Current status: Inactive

Online Gaming Review (OGR) was a video game website covering video games.

== History ==
Online Gaming Review was launched on December 1, 1995, by Paul Bannister. The site featured game news, features, reviews, hotlinks, Interviews, Previews, and downloads.

In October 1996, the website was acquired by Air Age Publishing, parent company of Computer Player magazine.

In December 1997, the website launched a new companion print magazine "OGR Magazine".

In August 1998, Strategy Plus, the owner of Computer Games Magazine, purchased OGR from Air Age, Inc.

The site has grown from 50 visitors a day to over 2100 per weekday (as of August 1996). In July 1996, over 40,000 people visited the site.

Richard Walker from Detroit Free Press praised the site saying it contains more information than most computer gaming magazines.

OGR has received several awards, including USA Today Hotsite, Microsoft Network's Website Pick of the Week” and The Adrenaline Vault's Top Ten game site award.

Web Magazine gave OGR a rating of 4 out of 5 in their March 1997 issue.
