= Adventures of Yogi Bear =

1994 video game

- North American SNES box art
- Developer: Blue Turtle
- Publishers: NA: Cybersoft; EU: Empire Interactive
- Designer: Martin Wakeley (SNES)
- Composer: George Villiers (SNES)
- Platforms: Super NES, Mega Drive
- Release: Super NES: NA: October 1994; EU: November 24, 1994; Mega Drive: EU: 1994
- Genre: Platform
- Mode: Single-player

Adventures of Yogi Bear is a platform game published by Cybersoft on October 1, 1994, in North America and later in Japan and Europe. The game is called Yogi Bear in Japan, Yogi Bear's: Cartoon Capers for the European Super NES version, and Yogi Bear Cartoon Capers for the Mega Drive version.

== Gameplay ==
This is the result of Yogi Bear being hit by weasels.

Adventures of Yogi Bear is a platform game in which the player controls Yogi Bear and must progress through five levels representing Yogi's home, Jellystone Park. Jellystone Park must not be turned into a chemical dumping zone; only Yogi can prevent that from happening.

The player must navigate through various climate zones (including tundra, swamps, and grasslands) in order to retrieve the picnic baskets. Collecting 100 time clocks allow players to receive an additional life. Enemies in the game include bats, skunks, weasels, ghosts, and other assorted baddies.

Players can also ride on mine carts and participate in surfing while using a beaver for a makeshift surfboard.

== Reception ==
Reviewing the SNES version, GamePro commented that Adventures of Yogi Bear is too easy and simplistic to appeal to experienced gamers, but that its pleasant atmosphere and lush graphics would make it enjoyable for novice players. Similarly, Electronic Gaming Monthly praised the "cute" graphics and sound effects, criticized the simplistic gameplay, and concluded that "younger kids will probably take to this game faster than older players will." They gave the game a 6.2 out of 10.
