= Star Crusader =

1994 video game

- Developer(s): Take-Two Interactive
- Publisher(s): Take-Two Publishing
- Platform(s): Amiga, CD32, MS-DOS
- Release: September 1994
- Genre(s): Space combat simulation
- Mode(s): Single player

Star Crusader is a space combat simulation released in 1994 by Take-Two Interactive. In 1995, a CD-ROM "Talkie" version was released.

== Story ==
The player assumes the role of Roman Alexandria, a crack pilot for the Gorene Empire in their conquest to assume control of the Ascalon Rift. The five races native to the Rift, previously enemies, join forces to resist the Gorene expansion and as Roman Alexandria, you are confronted with an ethical dilemma in deciding which side to fight for.

== Gameplay ==
As wing leader, the player assigns pilots to primary and secondary missions. Secondary missions consist of gathering equipment, conquering/protecting territory, or rescuing pilots. Additionally, pilots can be assigned to flight school to receive new recruits. Wingmen have their own skill sets indicating how good they are at flying, shooting, and following orders. The player gives orders to wingmen to attack, disable a target, or escape from battle.

Missions consist of destroying particular objectives, capturing ships, or performing reconnaissance. A special stealth ship is used for said recon missions. Fighters come in two varieties: quick and maneuverable attack fighters and slow, but heavily armed strike fighters. During combat, pilots fight against these two types of fighters as well as capital ships and bases. All craft are armed with laser cannons, but each race developed its own special secondary weapons such as plasma torpedoes and vector cannons on Tancred fighters.

== Reception ==
Reviewing the original DOS version, a critic for Next Generation remarked that Star Crusader is lacking in originality, but praised it for having gameplay with all the depth of Wing Commander III: Heart of the Tiger and considerably less "fluff", thus making the game accessible to the many players who either do not have PCs powerful enough to run Wing Commander III or simply have no interest in that game's cinematic elements.
