= Combo Racer =

1990 video game

- Developer: Imagetic Design
- Publisher: Gremlin Graphics
- Composer: Barry Leitch
- Platforms: Atari ST, Amiga
- Release: EU: 1990
- Genre: Racing
- Mode: Multiplayer

Combo Racer is a racing video game developed by Imagetic Design and published by Gremlin Graphics 1990. The game uses an isometric view and the player has to change gear manually. It contains a training mode, a normal game mode and a track editor.
