= American Gladiators (video game) =

1991 video game

- NES cover art
- Developers: Incredible Technologies (NES); Imagitec Design
- Publisher: GameTek
- Designers: Lonnie D. Ropp (Game); Chris Oberth (Software)
- Artist: Tony Sherman (NES)
- Composers: Leif Marwede (NES); Barry Leitch
- Platforms: NES, Super NES, Genesis, Amiga, Atari ST, MS-DOS
- Release: October 1991: NES; 1992: Amiga, MS-DOS; January 1993: Genesis; April 1993: SNES
- Genre: Sports
- Modes: Single-player, Multiplayer

American Gladiators is a video game developed by Incredible Technologies and released in 1991 by GameTek for the Nintendo Entertainment System. Ports were published in 1992 for Amiga and MS-DOS compatible operating systems, and then in 1993 for Genesis and Super NES, by Imagitec Design. It is based on the 1989 television game show American Gladiators.

== Gameplay ==
The NES version varied greatly from the others as well as the game show itself in that the events were morphed into side-scrolling and overhead mini-levels which only partially resembled the real-life events.

Each joust event involved four different gladiator battles atop platforms, with a series of joust platforms to be jumped across in between battles.

Human Cannonball also required four gladiators to be beaten with perfectly timed leaps off the rope while the gladiator's platform moved up and down, making the task more difficult. In this event and the Joust, gladiators screamed gratuitously (and often humorously) as they were knocked off the platforms.

The Wall featured numerous screens full of handholds and footholds with various obstacles, walls and floors. It also featured the occasional treacherous stretches with empty spaces that included very few handholds to navigate in order to advance. The gladiators were plentiful and attacked at different points in the wall level. They also moved twice as fast as the character. The wall was a particularly tough event due to its difficult controls that involved repeated rhythmic tapping of the A and B buttons with the directional pad to simulate the movement of the left and right hands to different handholds.

Assault featured a battle with a gladiator in a moving target at the top of the screen (unlike the stationary gladiator in the television series) which took between three and six successful hits to subdue, while the player's character could absorb three before being defeated.

The most accurate representation of any event in the game was Powerball, an event where the player could not lose a 'life' like in the other events. The player can even gain a 1UP if they evade the three gladiators and score a ball in each of the five baskets. (Players could also earn two more extra lives if they accomplished this task again in the same time limit, which decreased between levels.)

The Eliminator consisted of I-beams, in which a player jumped from one shotgun-like platform to the next, with different platforms varying greatly in height and length. Medicine balls were constantly arcing up from the bottom of the screen towards the player, attempting to knock them back and possibly off the I-beams to the ground below, thus ending the run. The player then jumped to a handbike and had to navigate back and forth around more medicine balls thrown through the air. This continued after the first handbike as the player then was made to run and jump across many straight and acutely angled conveyor belts while the medicine balls continued to stream down. This made being hit more difficult to recover from because the direction of the conveyor belts often added to the force of being hit with a medicine ball. After navigating a second handbike, the medicine balls cease and the player drops onto a zipline moving down and across the screen to the right. This zip line crosses a second zipline going in the opposite angle where the player must perfectly time his release to land on the next line. This pattern continues for several more successive lines, each moving faster than the previous, until the player finally lands on a platform after grabbing the ninth zip line, signifying victory.

By the time American Gladiators was released for the SNES, Amiga, and Genesis, the developers had changed the game to a more faithful copy of the television series. The game offered a two-player mode that switched between simultaneous and alternating play based on the event. There was also a tournament mode where up to 16 players (8 male and 8 female) could face off, with any missing slots filled in by computer players.

The events from the previous game were joined by Atlasphere, and were always played in the following order: Assault, Human Cannonball (not available on the Genesis version), Atlasphere, Joust, Powerball, and The Wall. Although the game was a more faithful interpretation of American Gladiators, adjustments were made as they had been in the NES version. They were:

Assault: 1 point per weapon fired, 5 for hitting the outer rim of the target, 10 for hitting the bullseye (although a player could never see what part of the target they hit)
Human Cannonball: One swing against one gladiator, 10 points if successful
Atlasphere: 1 point awarded per goal
Joust: 45 seconds, object was to drain opponent's power completely instead of knocking them off the platform
Powerball: 60 seconds, 1 point per outer cylinder goal, 2 points per center cylinder goal
The Wall: 30 seconds, contender had a five-second head start against gladiator

The Eliminator in this game combined elements of the first two seasons' courses. The treadmill run and handbike were the first two obstacles, followed by a run across the balance beam through a gauntlet of what appeared to be blocking pads (mimicking the first season course's attempt at the same thing, but using medicine balls instead). The cargo net climb and zipline were next, followed by the choice of a door which may or may not have had a gladiator behind it.

The player had 60 seconds to complete the course, and any fall immediately deducted 10 seconds from whatever time the player had left at that particular point. The player that reached the finish line first, regardless of time penalties, received 10 points and the second place player received 5. If an Eliminator ended with a tie score, the players ran the course again to break the tie.

== Reception ==
Reception

Review scores
Publication	Score
AllGame	2.5/5 (SNES); 3/5 (NES)
Aktueller Software Markt	4/12
Amiga Action	80%
Computer and Video Games	17/100
Joypad	19%
Mega Fun	SMD: 44/100
Nintendo Power	NES: 11.6/20; SNES: 11.3/20
Official Nintendo Magazine	38/100
Super Play	16%
Total!	6%
Video Games (DE)	38%
VideoGames & Computer Entertainment	5/10
Electronic Games	75%
MegaTech	32/100
Sega Force	47/100
Sega Visions	53/100
Super Action	48%

Generally, the Sega Genesis and SNES versions were heavily covered, whereas other ports either were barely reviewed or not covered at all. Amiga Action's Steve McNally scored the Amiga version 80%. While acknowledging how limited the gameplay was, writing "the events seem to last for about ten seconds as the Gladiators wipe the floor with you", he concluded that the overall product worked as "a simple, no-nonsense all out action game", considering it especially fun when playing with other human gamers. The Swedish magazine Datormagazin, on the other hand, scored the Amiga version two out of five.

The Sega Genesis and SNES version received overwhelmingly negative reviews. It was rated 16% by an August 1993 review from UK SNES magazine Super Play, the lowest rating yet, surpassing the SNES version of Pit-Fighter (1990) and GameTek's other game show adaptations like Jeopardy and Wheel of Fortune. Total! writer Chris, rating it an extremely low 6% and calling it "complete crap", argued the controls were "universally tragic and make the game even less enjoyable".

The most common complaint was the lack of skill required, amounting to nothing more than just mashing buttons. Nintendo Power also found the gameplay awkward in addition to being too simple, criticizing the control setups that were so odd and unlike the real experiences a player would have to read the manual to figure them out. The magazine stated Atlusphere and Powerball were the only two events with any real difficulty. Steve Keen of Computer & Video Games wrote "the gameplay is repetitive and rapidly dulls the brain", his only positive points being the ability to switch perspectives in Assault and the variety of obstacles in Eliminator. While Jeffrey Tschiltsch of Video Games & Computer Entertainment felt that the easy learning curve and the support for up to eight players may make a good multiplayer experience, Chris blasted the requirement to play with AI opponents in order to play with humans. Even Arnie Katz' positive review from Electronic Games claimed the product could have used more features, such as more close-ups of the Gladiators and a practice mode: "The inability to concentrate on one event at a time to perfect technique is frustrating".

The graphics and sound were also criticized. Nintendo Magazine System and Nintendo Power thought the presentation stayed true to the television series, Nintendo Power comparing its source material likeness to that of Acclaim Entertainment's WWF Super WrestleMania (1992). Conversely, MegaTech's Radion Automatic and Super Play's Jonathan Davies argued it lacked the source material's tongue-in-cheek, "showbizzy" atmosphere. He panned the identical look of the Gladiator sprites, as well as the wobbly animation of the sprites in general. Keen called the visuals unfathomably bad for the SNES and "the biggest pile of crap we've seen since King Kong was half way up the Empire S[t]ate Building and fancied a cack!". He spotlighted the "dreadful" sprites and their animations, and claimed the digitized pictures of the Gladiators at the beginning were the only good parts of the graphics. He, as well as other critics, called the sound to be some of the worst they heard, particularly the soundtrack. Jonathan Davies condemned the SNES version's absence of sound effects and repetition of a "dreadful tune".

In a favorable review of the Sega Genesis port, Katz found it to be the best version. In addition to the absence of Cannonball, he found the events to be better in the port than other versions. He considered this true even for his least favorite event, The Eliminator, which he otherwise found to be a "fairly humdrum side-scroller". He praised the game's ability to have easy-to-learn controls while including enough complication and variety to keep the player hooked. He described the events as "so exciting that many will wish there was a way to just play epic-length versions of each". His review was not without criticism, however. He condemned the small sprites and active areas of Powerball and Atlasphere during two-player mode, feeling they hindered the flow of the gameplay and made moving around the space harder. He also criticized Joust for being too limited in strategy, moves, and sprite animation.
