= Spectre (1991 video game) =

1991 video game

- Developer: Peninsula Gameworks
- Publisher: Velocity Development
- Designers: Sam Schillace; Steve Newman; Craig Fryar; Celia Fryar
- Platforms: Macintosh, MS-DOS, Windows, SNES, iOS
- Release: 1991 (Mac OS); 1992 (DOS); 1993 (Win); 1994 (SNES); 2010 (iOS)
- Genres: Vehicular combat, first-person shooter
- Modes: Single-player, multiplayer

Spectre is a video game for the Macintosh, developed in 1990 by Peninsula Gameworks and published in 1991 by Velocity Development. It is a 3D vector graphics tank battle reminiscent of the arcade game Battlezone. One sequel, Spectre VR, appeared on a number of lists of best video games.

== Gameplay ==

The goal of the game is to drive the tank around the playfield, collecting ten flags by driving over them, while avoiding obstacles (including rotating windmills) and the shots of computer-generated enemy tanks.

In single player mode, the player can choose four types of tanks, each one having different stats for shields, speed and ammo: Balance, Speedy, Strong and Custom. Each stage passed increases the game's difficulty (quantity and speed of enemy tanks). Furthermore, from level 6 appear orange cone-shaped tanks (which are faster and more resistant than normal enemy red tanks) and every 10 levels the shields of all enemy tanks are increased by 1. After level 9 is passed, the player can throw grenades, which cost 10 ammo and damage all enemy tanks in explosive range.

The game supported multiplayer operation over an AppleTalk network. Each player used a single Mac, and the other players were depicted as enemy tanks.

== Reception ==
Reception

Review scores
Publication	Score
AllGame	2.5/5 (Mac)
Dragon	5/5
Electronic Gaming Monthly	28/50
GamePro	18.5/20
M! Games	61%
Official Nintendo Magazine	84/100
Total!	81%
VideoGames & Computer Entertainment	6/10
Super Action	88%

Spectre was reviewed in 1992 in Dragon #184 by Hartley, Patricia, and Kirk Lesser in "The Role of Computers" column. The reviewers gave the game 5 out of 5 stars. It was nominated for an award at the 1993 Game Developers Conference.

Computer Gaming World in May 1994 stated that "despite the ... pretensions of cyberspace spread throughout the documentation", Spectre VR "is distilled essence of video game ... The action is pure and uncluttered by anything like plot, depth or even realism". The reviewer approved of the new enemies and playfield features, but reported that the game "was released too soon" without IPX compatibility, level editor, and other features.

In 1996 Next Generation listed the Macintosh version of Spectre VR as the 44th best game of all time, citing the "minimalist, hi-res, flat-shaded polys", excellent control even with a keyboard, hundreds of one-player mode levels, and the "fast and furious multiplayer combat".

In a retrospective review AllGame editor Lisa Karen Savignano criticized the graphics, noting that the game was "due for a remake" and that the game "is not a game you would want to spend money on".

== Sequels ==
A sequel, Spectre Supreme, was released in 1993. A Japan-exclusive sequel, Mega Spectre, was released for the FM Towns in 1993.

The 1994 release of Spectre for the SNES

The 1994 Spectre VR is an enhanced network-oriented version of the game. It and Spectre Supreme were also available for IBM PC compatibles.

The original Spectre was released as Spectre Classic in the late 1990s.

Brilliant Bytes Software released Spectre 3D (also known as Spectre: Cybertank Wars) for the Apple iPhone, iPod Touch, and iPad in May 2010. This version includes levels from Spectre Classic and Spectre VR, four multiplayer games including Arena, Capture the Flag, Flag Rally and Base Raid, adds 3D visuals, and Bluetooth, Internet and WiFi multiplayer support for up to 16 players. Dedicated hosted servers are also available for online play.

A browser game titled Spectre WEB was later released by the developers of Spectre 3D. As of June 2022, it was in alpha test status.
