= Big Nose the Caveman =

1991 video game

- Developers: Optimus Software, Codemasters
- Publishers: Camerica (NES), Codemasters (Amiga, Atari ST)
- Composers: Allister Brimble, Matthew Grey
- Platforms: NES, Amiga, Atari ST
- Release: NA: 1991
- Genre: Platform
- Mode: Single-player

Big Nose the Caveman is a side-scrolling platform game developed by Optimus Software and released in 1991 by Camerica for the Nintendo Entertainment System and by Codemasters for the Amiga and the Atari ST. A Master System and Game Gear version called Dinobasher was completed, but never published.

The game was followed by a sequel, Big Nose Freaks Out, in 1992.

== Gameplay ==
Big Nose runs through many islands to find his dinner, because he is very hungry. Along the way, Big Nose collects bones that he can use to buy items from the various shops that include spells, upgrades to his abilities and items.

This game is difficult due to the inability to restart from the last checkpoint once all lives are gone. It is also very long, with four islands (Paradise Island, Monster Island, Terror Island, and Chaos Island) each containing several levels. Big Nose the Caveman dies in a single hit unless he has stones. The stones can shoot out of his club, killing enemies. As many as three stones can come out of the club. There are also many pitfalls, traps and deadly lava/water since Big Nose cannot swim.

== Reception ==
Allgame gave a rating of 2.5 out of 5 stars, noting the major difference between this game and other platformers is that the player has to club the game's enemies instead of jumping on them to progress through the game, concluding: "Other than that, Big Nose is merely an adequate genre effort with large characters, flat backgrounds and uninteresting environments".
