= Viking Child =

1991 video game

- Lynx cover art
- Developer(s): Imagitec Design Limited
- Publisher(s): Atari Corporation
- Platform(s): Atari ST, Amiga, Lynx, Game Boy, MS-DOS
- Release: NA: 1991
- Genre(s): Action
- Mode(s): Single-player

Prophecy I: The Viking Child (shortened to Viking Child on some systems) is an action video game released by Imagitec Design Limited for the Atari ST, Amiga, Atari Lynx, Game Boy, and MS-DOS compatible operating systems in 1991. The Atari ST original was programmed by Mark Fisherwith with graphics by Anthony Rosbottom and music by Barry Leitch and Ian Howe.

Ports to the Game Gear, Master System, and Commodore 64 were cancelled. A planned sequel, Viking Child 2, was not released.

== Plot ==
This video game was based on a Viking Child called Brian who must enter the Halls of Valhalla and do battle against the evil god Loki and his minions.

== Gameplay ==
The game closely resembled Sega's Wonder Boy in Monster Land, as certain elements like collecting hidden gold, upgrading the character's weapons and visiting shops were practically identical, despite the difference in release times.

The game includes no save game feature. However, passwords can be earned and used to allow access to later levels.

== Reception ==
Reception

Review scores
Publication	Score
IGN	7/10 (Lynx)
Raze	87% (Amiga); 84% (Atari ST)
Amiga Power	29%

Robert A. Jung reviewed the Lynx version of the game which was posted to IGN. In his final verdict he wrote "While Viking Child is a pleasant diversion, it is missing the refinements needed for greatness. The biggest appeal is in exploring the land and just trying to survive, but it should not be mistaken for an adventure game. Still, if you're looking for something that's a little more than the typical run-and-jump title, Viking Child is worth a try." Giving a final score of 7 out of 10.

Raze Magazine reviewed the Amiga and Atari ST versions of the game in December 1990.
