= Gemini Wing =

1987 video game

- Developer: Tecmo
- Publisher: Tecmo
- Platforms: Arcade, ZX Spectrum, Amstrad CPC, Commodore 64, Atari ST, Amiga, MSX, X68000
- Release: JP: October 31, 1987; NA: February 1988
- Genre: Scrolling shooter
- Modes: Single-player, multiplayer

Gemini Wing (Note: Japanese: ジェミニウィング, Hepburn: Jemini Wingu) is a 1987 vertically scrolling shooter video game developed and published by Tecmo for arcades. It was released in Japan in October 1987 and North America in February 1988. Home conversions were released for the ZX Spectrum, Commodore 64, Amstrad CPC, Amiga, Atari ST, MSX, and X68000. Hamster Corporation released the game as part of their Arcade Archives series for the Nintendo Switch and PlayStation 4 in September 2020.

== Gameplay ==
One or two players control a futuristic aircraft flying over terrain and shooting enemies of an animalistic or insectoid design. Outside of normal ammunition, players can pick up numerous "gunballs", power-ups which contain strong attacks and can be accumulated for later use.

== Reception ==
In Japan, Game Machine listed Gemini Wing on their December 15, 1987 issue as being the eighth most-successful table arcade unit of the month.
