= List of Super Nintendo Entertainment System games =

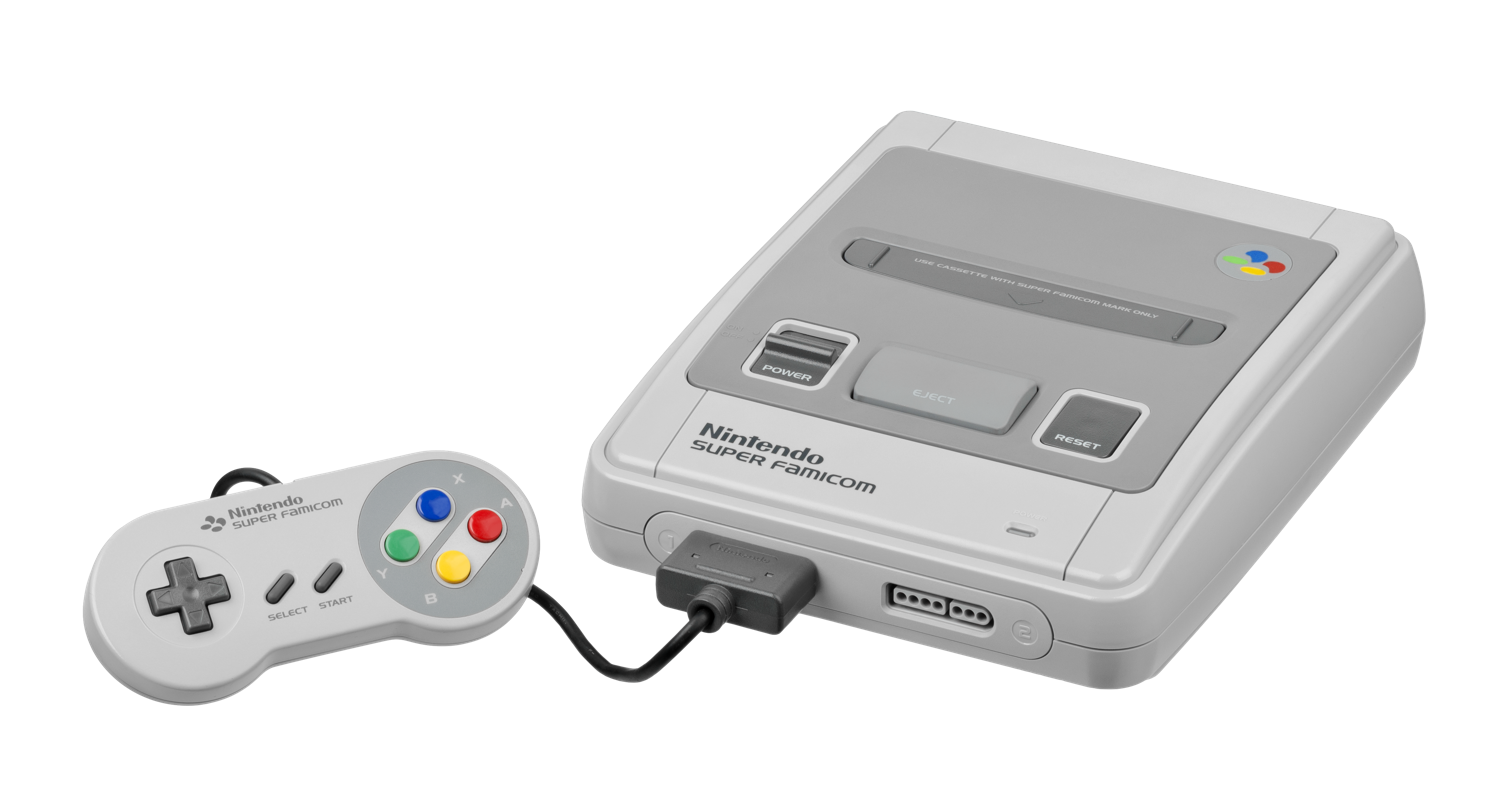
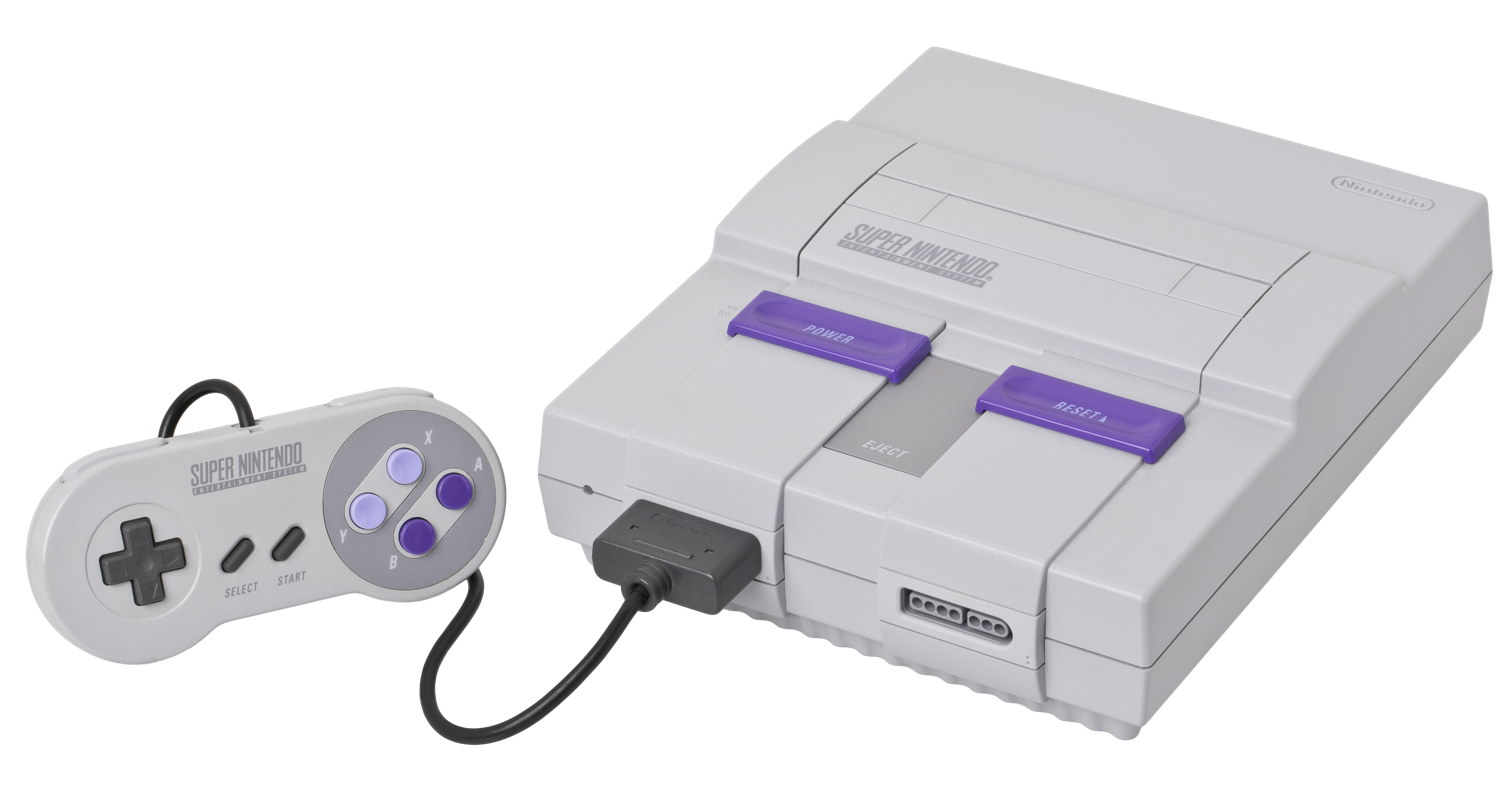
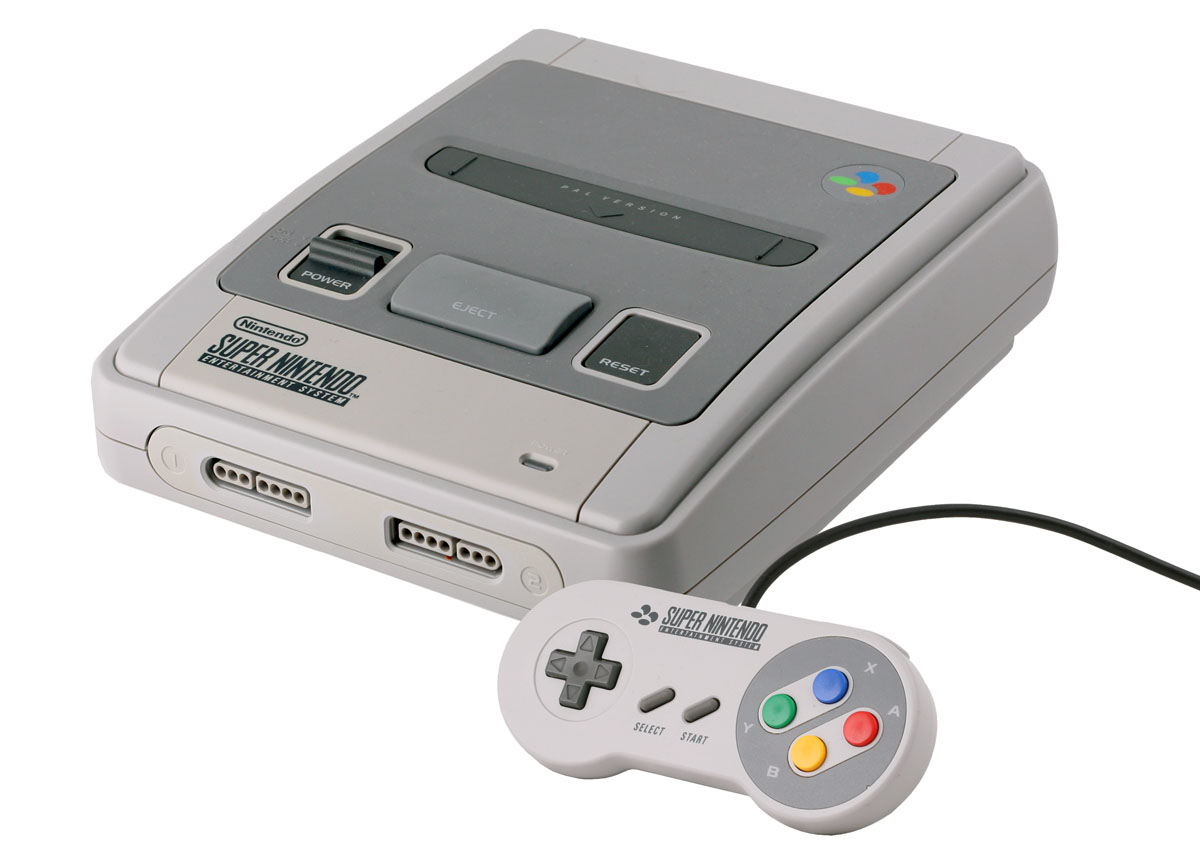
The Japanese Super Famicom (top), North American Super Nintendo Entertainment System (middle), and PAL Super Nintendo Entertainment System (bottom)

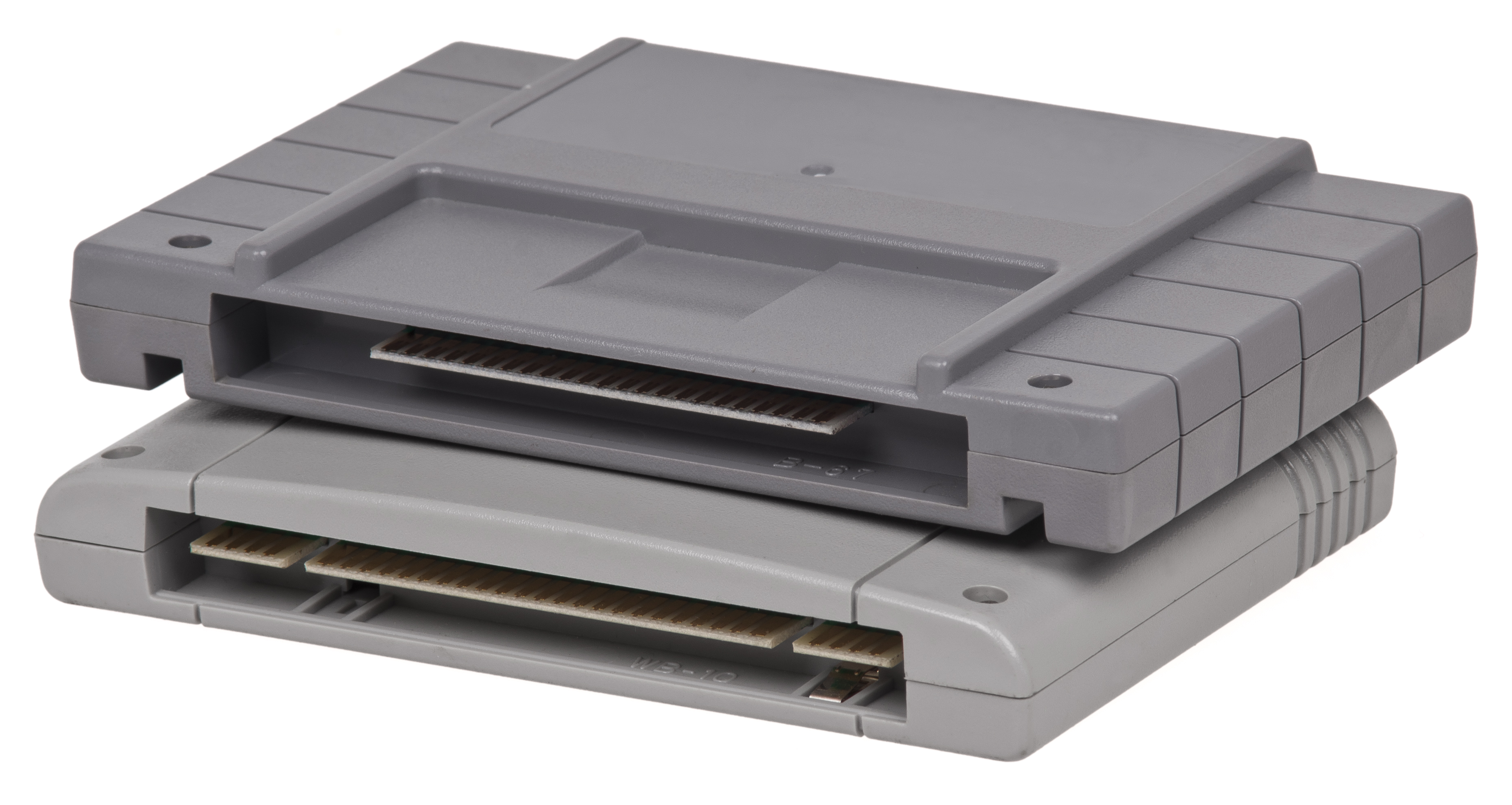
Super Nintendo Entertainment System cartridges. Top: North American regular design Bottom: PAL/Japanese region design with 16 additional pins, indicating the presence of an enhancement chip

The Super Nintendo Entertainment System has a library of 1,749 official releases, of which 717 were released in North America plus 4 championship cartridges, 532 in Europe, 1,440 in Japan, 231 on Satellaview, and 13 on SuFami Turbo. 296 releases are common to all regions, 147 were released in Japan and the US only, 165 in Europe and the US, and 27 in Japan and Europe. There are 977 Japanese exclusives, 111 US exclusives, and 35 European exclusives. The Super NES was released in North America on August 23, 1991, with its launch titles being Super Mario World, F-Zero, Pilotwings, Gradius III, and SimCity. Despite the console's relatively late start, and the fierce competition it faced in North America and Europe from Sega's Genesis/Mega Drive console, it was the best-selling console of its era.

The last game to be officially published during the console's lifespan was Metal Slader Glory: Director's Cut, originally available on November 29, 2000 as a Nintendo Power pre-written cartridge from pre-orders made at Lawson stores, and later released on December 1, 2000 as a normal downloadable title. The last game to be physically released in Japan on a dedicated cartridge was Fire Emblem: Thracia 776, published on January 21, 2000. In North America, the final official title was Frogger from Majesco, which was the only SNES game released in 1998. The best-selling game is Super Mario World, with over 20.6 million units sold.

Games were released in plastic-encased ROM cartridges. The cartridges are shaped differently for different regions; North American cartridges have a rectangular bottom with inset grooves matching protruding tabs in the console, while other regions' cartridges are narrower with a smooth curve on the front and no grooves. The physical incompatibility can be overcome with use of various adapters, or through modification of the console. Internally, a regional lockout chip within the console and in each cartridge prevents PAL region games from being played on Japanese or North American consoles and vice versa. This can be overcome through the use of adapters, typically by inserting the imported cartridge in one slot and a cartridge with the correct region chip in a second slot. Alternatively, disconnecting one pin of the console's lockout chip will prevent it from locking the console, although hardware in later games can detect this situation.

The list is by default organized alphabetically by their English titles or their alphabet conversions, but it is also possible to sort each column individually. It is arranged with the different titles being listed once for each program that it contains; the various titles are listed by the majority name first. When two English regions released a game with different names, the title in the region it was first released is listed first. All English titles are listed first, with an alternate title listed afterward. This list also include the games that were released exclusively for the Nintendo Power. In the case of a game that was distributed in Japan both for the Nintendo Power and as a standard cartridge, it's the release date of the latter that is mentioned here regardless if it came out first digitally. For release dates specific to the Nintendo Power, see Nintendo Power (cartridge)#List of games.

== Retail releases ==
Title	Developer(s)	Publisher(s)	Release date			Ref.
Title	Developer(s)	Publisher(s)	Japan	North America	PAL region	Ref.
3 Ninjas Kick Back	Malibu Interactive	Sony Imagesoft	Unreleased	June 1994	Unreleased	
3×3 Eyes Jūma Hōkan	System Supply N-Tech	Banpresto	December 22, 1995	Unreleased	Unreleased	
3×3 Eyes Seima Kōrin-den	Nova Games	Yutaka	July 28, 1992	Unreleased	Unreleased	
3rd Super Robot Wars	Banpresto	Banpresto	July 23, 1993	Unreleased	Unreleased	
4 Nin Shōgi	Planning Office Wada	Planning Office Wada	July 14, 1995	Unreleased	Unreleased	
4th Super Robot Wars	Banpresto	Banpresto	March 17, 1995	Unreleased	Unreleased	
The 7th Saga •Elnard^{JP}	Produce	Gameplan21 (JP); Enix (NA)	April 23, 1993	September 1993	Unreleased	
90 Minutes European Prime Goal •J.League Soccer Prime Goal 3^{JP}	Namco	Namco (JP); Ocean Software (PAL)	August 4, 1995	Unreleased	December 20, 1995	
A-Train III •AIII S.V.: Take the [A] Train 3 Super Version^{JP}	Pack-In-Video	Artdink	September 29, 1995	Unreleased	Unreleased	
A.S.P. Air Strike Patrol •Desert Fighter^{PAL} •Desert Fighter: Suna no Arashi Sakusen^{JP}	Opus	SETA (JP/NA); System 3 (PAL)	February 18, 1994	January 1995	September 1994	
Aaahh!!! Real Monsters	Realtime Associates	Viacom New Media	Unreleased	August 1995	1995	
ABC Monday Night Football	Data East; Kūsōkagaku	Data East	November 26, 1993	December 1993	Unreleased	
Accele Brid	Tomy	Tomy	November 26, 1993	Unreleased	Unreleased	
Acme Animation Factory	Probe Entertainment	Sunsoft	Unreleased	November 1994	March 1995	
Acrobat Mission	Micronics	Techiku	September 11, 1992	Unreleased	Unreleased	
Action Pachio	Coconuts Japan	Coconuts Japan	April 9, 1993	Unreleased	Unreleased	
ActRaiser (Note: Also released digitally for Satellaview. "DAT-o-MATIC".) •Actraiser^{JP}	Quintet	Enix	December 16, 1990	November 1991	March 18, 1993	
ActRaiser 2 •ActRaiser 2: Chinmoku e no Seisen^{JP}	Quintet	Enix (JP/NA); Ubisoft (PAL)	October 29, 1993	November 1993	November 1994	
The Addams Family	Ocean Software	Misawa (JP); Ocean Software (NA/PAL)	October 23, 1992	March 1992	November 19, 1992	
The Addams Family: Pugsley's Scavenger Hunt	Ocean Software	Ocean Software	Unreleased	February 1993	1992	
Addams Family Values	Ocean Software	Ocean Software	Unreleased	February 1995	March 28, 1996	
Advanced Dungeons & Dragons: Eye of the Beholder	Capcom	Capcom	March 18, 1994	April 1994	Unreleased	
The Adventures of Batman & Robin	Konami	Konami	Unreleased	December 1994	1994	
The Adventures of Dr. Franken	MotiveTime	DTMC (NA); Elite Systems (PAL)	Unreleased	December 1993	1993	
The Adventures of Mighty Max	WJS Design	Ocean Software	Unreleased	February 1995	1995	
The Adventures of Rocky and Bullwinkle and Friends	Imagineering	THQ	Unreleased	June 1993	Unreleased	
The Adventures of Tintin: Prisoners of the Sun	Infogrames	Infogrames	Unreleased	Unreleased	February 9, 1997	
Adventures of Yogi Bear •Yogi Bear's Cartoon Capers^{PAL} •Yogi Bear^{JP}	Blue Turtle	Magifact (JP); Cybersoft (NA); Empire Interactive (PAL)	January 3, 1995	October 1994	November 24, 1994	
Aero Fighters •Sonic Wings^{JP}	Video System	Video System (JP); MC O'River (NA)	July 30, 1993	November 1994	Unreleased	
Aero the Acro-Bat	Iguana Entertainment	Sunsoft	Unreleased	October 12, 1993	November 1993	
Aero the Acro-Bat 2	Iguana Entertainment	Sunsoft	Unreleased	November 1994	August 1994	
Aerobiz •Air Management: Oozora ni Kakeru^{JP}	Koei	Koei	April 9, 1992	February 1993	Unreleased	
Aerobiz Supersonic •Air Management II: Kōkū Ō wo Mezase^{JP}	Koei	Koei	April 2, 1993	August 1994	Unreleased	
Aim for the Ace!	Telenet Japan	Telenet Japan	December 22, 1993	Unreleased	Unreleased	
Air Cavalry	Synergistic Software	Cybersoft (NA); GameTek (PAL)	Unreleased	June 1995	1995	
Akazukin Chacha	Landwarf	Tomy	August 9, 1996	Unreleased	Unreleased	
Al Unser Jr.'s Road to the Top	Radical Entertainment	The Software Toolworks (NA); Mindscape (PAL)	Unreleased	November 1994	1994	
Aladdin	Capcom	Capcom	November 26, 1993	November 15, 1993	January 27, 1994	
Albert Odyssey	Sunsoft	Sunsoft	March 5, 1993	Unreleased	Unreleased	
Albert Odyssey 2: Jashin no Taidō	Sunsoft	Sunsoft	December 22, 1994	Unreleased	Unreleased	
Alcahest	HAL Laboratory	Square	December 17, 1993	Unreleased	Unreleased	
Alfred Chicken •Super Alfred Chicken^{NA}	Twilight Games	Mindscape	Unreleased	February 1994	1994	
Alice no Paint Adventure	Pop House; SAS Sakata	Epoch Co.	September 15, 1995	Unreleased	Unreleased	
Alien 3	Probe Entertainment	Acclaim Entertainment (JP); LJN (NA/PAL)	July 9, 1993	May 1993	June 28, 1993	
Alien vs Predator •Aliens vs Predator^{JP}	Jorudan	IGS (JP); Activision (NA/PAL)	January 8, 1993	September 1993	1993	
The Amazing Spider-Man: Lethal Foes	Agenda	Epoch Co.	March 17, 1995	Unreleased	Unreleased	
America Oudan Ultra Quiz	Genki	Tomy	November 20, 1992	Unreleased	Unreleased	
American Battle Dome	Betop	Tsukuda Original	December 8, 1995	Unreleased	Unreleased	
American Gladiators	Imagitec Design	GameTek	Unreleased	April 1993	Unreleased	
An American Tail: Fievel Goes West	Shimada Kikaku	Hudson Soft	Unreleased	August 1994	November 1994	
Ancient Magic: Bazoo! Mahō Sekai	Hot-B	Hot-B	July 23, 1993	Unreleased	Unreleased	
Andre Agassi Tennis	Radiance Software	TecMagik	March 31, 1994	May 31, 1994	Unreleased	
Angelique	Ruby Party	Koei, NEC	September 23, 1994	Unreleased	Unreleased	
Angelique: Premium Box	Ruby Party	Koei, NEC	December 8, 1995	Unreleased	Unreleased	
Angelique: Voice Fantasy	Ruby Party	Koei, NEC	March 29, 1996	Unreleased	Unreleased	
Animaniacs	Konami	Konami	March 7, 1997	November 1994	December 1994	
Another World •Out of This World^{NA} •Outer World^{JP}	Delphine Software International	Victor Interactive Software (JP); Interplay Entertainment (NA/PAL)	November 27, 1992	November 1992	1992	
Aoki Densetsu Shoot!	Affect	KSS	December 16, 1994	Unreleased	Unreleased	
Appleseed: Oracle of Prometheus	Visit	Visit	August 26, 1994	Unreleased	Unreleased	
Arabian Nights: Spirit of the Desert King	Pandora Box	Takara	June 14, 1996	Unreleased	Unreleased	
Araiguma Rascal	J-Force	Masaya	March 25, 1994	Unreleased	Unreleased	
Arcade's Greatest Hits: The Atari Collection 1	Digital Eclipse Software	Midway Games	Unreleased	August 20, 1997	Unreleased	
Arcana •Card Master: Rimsalia no Fūin^{JP}	HAL Laboratory	HAL Laboratory	March 27, 1992	May 1992	Unreleased	
Archer Maclean's Super Dropzone	Eurocom Entertainment Software	Psygnosis	Unreleased	Cancelled	December 1995	
Arcus Spirits •Arcus Odyssey^{NA, PAL}	Wolf Team	Sammy Corporation	October 22, 1993	Cancelled	Cancelled	
Ardy Lightfoot	ASCII Entertainment	ASCII Entertainment (JP); Titus Software (NA/PAL)	November 26, 1993	February 1994	October 31, 1994	
Aretha: Aretha the Super Famicom (Note: Also released digitally for Nintendo Power. "Official Nintendo Power webpage". Nintendo. Archived from the original on December 31, 2002.)	Japan Art Media	Yanoman	November 26, 1993	Unreleased	Unreleased	
Aretha II: Ariel no Fushigi na Tabi	Japan Art Media	Yanoman	December 2, 1994	Unreleased	Unreleased	
Arkanoid: Doh It Again	Taito	Taito (JP); Nintendo (NA/PAL)	January 15, 1997	November 3, 1997	December 18, 1997	
Art of Fighting •Ryūko no Ken^{JP}	Monolith Corporation	K Amusement Leasing (JP); Takara (NA/PAL)	October 29, 1993	December 1993	1993	
Asahi Shinbun Rensai: Katō Ichi-Ni-San Shōgi: Shingiryū	Varie	Varie	September 22, 1995	Unreleased	Unreleased	
Asameshimae Nyanko	J-Force	Zamuse	March 18, 1994	Unreleased	Unreleased	
Ashita no Joe	Wave Corp	K Amusement Leasing	November 27, 1992	Unreleased	Unreleased	
Asterix	Infogrames	Infogrames	Unreleased	Cancelled	May 30, 1993	
Asterix & Obelix	Infogrames	Infogrames	Unreleased	Unreleased	September 28, 1995	
The Atlas	Artdink	Pack-In-Video	March 24, 1995	Unreleased	Unreleased	
Axelay (Note: Also released in South Korea. "Hyundai Super Comboy : The Master List (in English)". scanlines16.com.)	Konami	Konami	September 11, 1992	September 1992	September 30, 1992	
B.O.B. •Space Funky B.O.B.^{JP}	Gray Matter	Electronic Arts	December 22, 1993	June 1993	July 22, 1993	
Bahamut Lagoon	Square	Square	February 9, 1996	Unreleased	Unreleased	
Bakukyū Renpatsu!! Super B-Daman	Amble	Hudson Soft	December 19, 1997	Unreleased	Unreleased	
Bakumatsu Kōrinden Oni	Pandora Box	Banpresto	February 2, 1996	Unreleased	Unreleased	
Bakuto Dochers	Genki	Bullet-Proof Software	October 28, 1994	Unreleased	Unreleased	
Ball Bullet Gun: Survival Game Simulation	Betop	I'MAX	December 1, 1995	Unreleased	Unreleased	
Ballz •3 Jigen Kakuto: Ballz^{JP}	PF.Magic	Media Rings (JP); Accolade (NA)	April 28, 1995	November 18, 1994	Unreleased	
Barbarossa	SystemSoft Alpha	Sammy Corporation	November 27, 1992	Unreleased	Unreleased	
Barbie: Super Model	Tahoe Software Productions	Hi Tech Expressions	Unreleased	December 1993	Unreleased	
Barkley Shut Up and Jam! •Barkley's Power Dunk^{JP}	Accolade	Den'Z (JP); Accolade (NA); Sony Imagesoft (PAL)	September 30, 1994	June 7, 1994	December 1994	
Bass Masters Classic	Malibu Games	Altron (JP); Malibu Games (NA)	July 28, 1995	June 1995	Unreleased	
Bass Masters Classic: Pro Edition	Black Pearl Software	Black Pearl Software	Unreleased	July 1996	November 1996	
Bassin's Black Bass with Hank Parker •Super Black Bass 2^{JP}	Starfish	Hot-B	September 23, 1994	November 1994	Unreleased	
Bastard!!: Ankoku no Hakai-shin	Kazushi Hagiwara; Shueisha	Cobra Team	January 28, 1994	Unreleased	Unreleased	
Batman Forever	Probe Entertainment	Acclaim Entertainment	October 27, 1995	September 7, 1995	September 7, 1995	
Batman Returns	Konami	Konami	February 26, 1993	May 1993	May 7, 1993	
Battle Blaze	Aicom	Sammy Corporation (JP); American Sammy (NA)	May 1, 1992	January 1994	Unreleased	
Battle Cars	Malibu Interactive	Namco	Unreleased	December 1993	Unreleased	
Battle Clash •Space Bazooka^{JP}	Intelligent Systems	Nintendo	June 21, 1993	October 1992	March 18, 1993	
Battle Commander: Hachibushū Shura no Heihō	Arc System Works	Banpresto	December 29, 1991	Unreleased	Unreleased	
Battle Cross	A-Max	Imagineer	December 9, 1994	Unreleased	Unreleased	
Battle Dodge Ball	Banpresto	Banpresto	July 20, 1991	Cancelled	Unreleased	
Battle Dodge Ball II	Nova Games	Banpresto	July 23, 1993	Unreleased	Unreleased	
Battle Grand Prix	KID	Naxat Soft (JP); Hudson Soft (NA)	March 27, 1992	April 1993	Unreleased	
Battle Jockey	Nova Games	Virgin Interactive Entertainment	December 22, 1994	Unreleased	Unreleased	
Battle Master: Kyūkyoku no Senshitachi	System Vision	Toshiba EMI	November 19, 1993	Unreleased	Unreleased	
Battle Pinball	Banpresto	Banpresto	February 25, 1995	Unreleased	Unreleased	
Battle Racers	Banpresto	Banpresto	March 17, 1995	Unreleased	Unreleased	
Battle Robot Retsuden	Winkysoft	Banpresto	September 1, 1995	Unreleased	Unreleased	
Battle Soccer: Field no Hasha	Pandora Box	Banpresto	December 11, 1992	Unreleased	Unreleased	
Battle Soccer 2	Pandora Box	Banpresto	November 25, 1994	Unreleased	Unreleased	
Battle Submarine	Office Kōkan	Pack-In-Video	December 22, 1995	Unreleased	Unreleased	
Battle Tycoon: Flash Hiders SFX	Right Stuff	Right Stuff	May 19, 1995	Unreleased	Unreleased	
Battle Zeque Den	Arsys Software	Asmik Ace Entertainment	July 15, 1994	Unreleased	Unreleased	
Battletoads & Double Dragon: The Ultimate Team	Rare	Tradewest (NA); Sony Imagesoft (PAL)	Unreleased	December 1993	July 10, 1994	
Battletoads in Battlemaniacs	Rare	Masaya (JP); Tradewest (NA); Nintendo (PAL)	January 3, 1994	June 1993	October 1993	
Bazooka Blitzkrieg •Destructive^{JP}	Tose	Bandai	August 27, 1993	December 1992	Unreleased	
Beauty and the Beast •Bijo to Yajū^{JP}	Probe Entertainment	Virgin Interactive Entertainment (JP); Hudson Soft (NA/PAL)	July 8, 1994	July 1994	February 23, 1995	
Beavis and Butt-head	Realtime Associates	Viacom New Media	Unreleased	November 1994	May 1995	
Bebe's Kids	Radical Entertainment	Motown Software	Unreleased	April 1994	Unreleased	
Beethoven: The Ultimate Canine Caper •Beethoven's 2nd^{PAL}	Riedel Software Productions	Hi Tech Expressions	Unreleased	December 1993	1993	
Benkei Gaiden: Suna no Shō	Sunsoft	Sunsoft	December 18, 1992	Unreleased	Unreleased	
Best of the Best: Championship Karate •Super Kick Boxing^{JP}	Loriciel	Electro Brain (JP/NA); Futura (PAL)	March 5, 1993	November 1993	1993	
Best Shot Pro Golf	KID	ASCII Entertainment	June 14, 1996	Unreleased	Unreleased	
Big Ichigeki! Pachi-Slot Daikōryaku	Syscom	Ask Kōdansha	December 16, 1994	Unreleased	Unreleased	
Big Ichigeki! Pachi-Slot Daikouryaku 2	Syscom	Ask Kōdansha	July 21, 1995	Unreleased	Unreleased	
Big Sky Trooper	LucasArts	JVC Musical Industries	Unreleased	October 1995	1995	
Bike Daisuki! Hashiriya Kon: Rider's Spirits	Genki	Masaya	September 30, 1994	Unreleased	Unreleased	
Biker Mice from Mars	Konami	Konami	Unreleased	December 1994	January 1995	
Bill Laimbeer's Combat Basketball	Hewson Consultants	Hudson Soft	Unreleased	December 1991	Unreleased	
Bill Walsh College Football	Visual Concepts	EA Sports	Unreleased	February 1994	Unreleased	
Bing Bing! Bingo	Copya Systems	KSS	December 22, 1993	Unreleased	Unreleased	
BioMetal	Athena	Athena (JP); Activision (NA/PAL)	March 19, 1993	November 1993	1993	
Bishōjo Janshi Suchie-Pai	DCE	Jaleco	July 30, 1993	Unreleased	Unreleased	
Bishōjo Senshi Sailor Moon: Another Story	Arc System Works; TNS	Angel	September 22, 1995	Unreleased	Unreleased	
Bishōjo Senshi Sailor Moon R	Arc System Works	Bandai	December 29, 1993	Unreleased	Unreleased	
Bishōjo Senshi Sailor Moon S: Jōgai Rantō!? Shuyaku Sōdatsusen	Arc System Works	Angel	December 16, 1994	Unreleased	Unreleased	
Bishōjo Senshi Sailor Moon S: Kondo wa Puzzle de Oshioki yo!	Tom Create	Bandai	July 15, 1994	Unreleased	Unreleased	
Bishōjo Senshi Sailor Moon S: Kurukkurin	Tom Create	Bandai	February 24, 1995	Unreleased	Unreleased	
Bishōjo Senshi Sailor Moon SuperS: Fuwa Fuwa Panic	Tom Create	Bandai	December 8, 1995	Unreleased	Unreleased	
Bishōjo Senshi Sailor Moon Stars: Fuwa Fuwa Panic 2 (Note: Released on SuFami Turbo cartridge. "Sufami Turbo".)	Tom Create	Bandai	September 27, 1996	Unreleased	Unreleased	
Bishōjo Senshi Sailor Moon SuperS: Zenin Sanka! Shuyaku Sōdatsusen	Angel	Angel	March 29, 1996	Unreleased	Unreleased	
Bishōjo Wrestlinger's History: Beauty Girl Wrestling	Nihon Soft System	KSS	March 29, 1996	Unreleased	Unreleased	
Blackthorne •Blackhawk^{PAL}	Blizzard Entertainment	Kemco (JP); Interplay Entertainment (NA); Laguna GmbH (PAL)	August 11, 1995	September 1994	February 23, 1995	
BlaZeon: The Bio-Cyborg Challenge	AI	Atlus	July 24, 1992	October 1992	Unreleased	
Block Kuzushi	OeRSTED	Planning Office Wada	November 17, 1995	Unreleased	Unreleased	
The Blue Crystal Rod	Game Studio	Namco	March 25, 1994	Unreleased	Unreleased	
The Blues Brothers	Titus Software	Kemco (JP); Titus Software (NA/PAL)	March 26, 1993	June 1993	1993	
Bomberman B-Daman	A.I. Company Ltd.	Hudson Soft	December 20, 1996	Unreleased	Unreleased	
Bonkers	Sun L	Capcom	January 3, 1995	October 1994	Unreleased	
Boogerman: A Pick and Flick Adventure	Interplay Entertainment	Interplay Entertainment	Unreleased	December 5, 1995	January 25, 1996	
Bounty Sword	ITL	Pioneer LDC	September 8, 1995	Unreleased	Unreleased	
Boxing Legends of the Ring •Chavez II^{MX} •Final Knockout^{JP}	Sculptured Software	Pack-In-Video (JP); Electro Brain (NA/PAL)	November 5, 1993	October 1993	1993	
Brain Lord	Produce	Enix	January 29, 1994	October 1994	Unreleased	
The Brainies	Titus Software	Titus Software	Unreleased	April 1996	1996	
Bram Stoker's Dracula	Psygnosis; Traveller's Tales	Sony Imagesoft	Unreleased	September 1993	1993	
Brandish	Koei	Koei	June 25, 1994	February 1995	Unreleased	
Brandish 2: The Planet Buster	Koei	Koei	August 11, 1995	Unreleased	Unreleased	
Brandish 2 Expert	Koei	Koei	March 15, 1996	Unreleased	Unreleased	
Brawl Brothers •Brawl Brothers: Rival Turf! 2^{PAL} •Rushing Beat Ran: Fukusei Toshi^{JP}	Jaleco	Jaleco	December 22, 1992	April 1993	1993	
BreakThru!	Artech Digital Entertainment	Spectrum HoloByte	Unreleased	June 1994	Unreleased	
Breath of Fire	Capcom	Capcom (JP); Square (NA)	April 3, 1993	August 1994	Unreleased	
Breath of Fire II •Breath of Fire II: Shimei no Ko^{JP}	Capcom	Capcom (JP/NA); Laguna GmbH (PAL)	December 2, 1994	December 1995	April 25, 1996	
Brett Hull Hockey	Radical Entertainment	Accolade (NA); Sony Imagesoft (PAL)	Unreleased	January 1994	1994	
Brett Hull Hockey '95	Radical Entertainment	Accolade	Unreleased	January 1995	Unreleased	
Bronkie the Bronchiasaurus	WaveQuest	Raya Systems	Unreleased	September 1995	Unreleased	
Brunswick World: Tournament of Champions	Tiertex Design Studios	THQ	Unreleased	August 1997	Unreleased	
Brutal: Paws of Fury •Brutal: Animal Buranden^{JP}	Eurocom Entertainment Software	Kemco (JP); Cybersoft (NA); GameTek (PAL)	December 22, 1994	December 1994	1994	
Bubsy in Claws Encounters of the Furred Kind •Yamaneko Bubsy no Daibōken^{JP}	Accolade; Solid Software	Pack-In-Video (JP); Accolade (NA); Nintendo (PAL)	June 17, 1994	May 1993	October 28, 1993	
Bubsy II	Accolade	Accolade	Unreleased	October 15, 1994	June 4, 1994	
Bugs Bunny Rabbit Rampage •Bugs Bunny Hachamecha Daibōken^{JP}	Viacom New Media	Sunsoft	June 24, 1994	February 1994	September 29, 1994	
Bulls vs. Blazers and the NBA Playoffs •NBA Pro Basketball: Bulls vs Blazers^{JP}	Electronic Arts	Electronic Arts Victor (JP); Electronic Arts (NA/PAL)	February 26, 1993	December 1992	1992	
Burai: Hachigyoku no Yūshi Densetsu	Pandora Box	IGS	January 14, 1993	Unreleased	Unreleased	
Bushi Seiryūden: Futari no Yūsha	Game Freak	T&E Soft	January 17, 1997	Unreleased	Unreleased	
Bust-a-Move •Puzzle Bobble: Bust-a-Move^{PAL} •Puzzle Bobble^{JP}	Taito	Taito	January 13, 1995	March 1995	1995	
Cacoma Knight in Bizyland •Cacoma Knight^{JP}	Affect	Datam Polystar (JP); SETA (NA)	November 21, 1992	June 1993	Unreleased	
Cal Ripken Jr. Baseball	Acme Interactive	Mindscape	Unreleased	December 1992	1993	
California Games II	Silicon Sorcery	Hect (JP); DTMC (NA); Imagineer (PAL)	March 12, 1993	January 1993	1993	
Cannon Fodder	Sensible Software	Virgin Interactive Entertainment	Unreleased	Unreleased	January 1994	
Cannondale Cup	Radical Entertainment	American Softworks	Unreleased	November 1994	Unreleased	
Capcom's MVP Football	Equilibrium	Capcom	Unreleased	October 1993	Unreleased	
Capcom's Soccer Shootout •Soccer Shootout^{PAL} •J. League Excite Stage '94^{JP}	A-Max	Epoch Co. (JP); Capcom (NA); Nintendo (PAL)	May 1, 1994	June 1994	1994	
Captain America and The Avengers	Realtime Associates	Mindscape	Unreleased	September 1993	1993	
Captain Commando	Capcom	Capcom	March 17, 1995	August 1995	1995	
Captain Novolin	Sculptured Software	Raya Systems	Unreleased	November 1992	Unreleased	
Captain Tsubasa 3: Kōtei no Chōsen	Tecmo	Tecmo	July 17, 1992	Unreleased	Unreleased	
Captain Tsubasa 4: Pro no Rival Tachi	Tecmo	Tecmo	April 3, 1993	Unreleased	Unreleased	
Captain Tsubasa 5: Hasha no Shōgō Campione	Tecmo	Tecmo	December 9, 1994	Unreleased	Unreleased	
Captain Tsubasa J: The Way to World Youth	BEC	Bandai	November 17, 1995	Unreleased	Unreleased	
Caravan Shooting Collection	Hudson Soft	Hudson Soft	July 7, 1995	Unreleased	Unreleased	
Carrier Aces	Synergistic Software	Yumedia (JP); Cybersoft (NA); GameTek (PAL)	July 28, 1995	January 1995	1995	
Casper	Imagineering	Natsume Inc.	Unreleased	December 1996	1997	
Casper (Japanese game)	Natsume Co., Ltd.	KSS	March 14, 1997	Unreleased	Unreleased	
Castlevania: Dracula X •Castlevania: Vampire's Kiss^{PAL} •Akumajō Dracula XX^{JP}	Konami	Konami	July 21, 1995	September 1995	February 22, 1996	
CB Chara Wars: Ushinawareta Gag	Almanic	Banpresto	August 28, 1992	Unreleased	Unreleased	
Champions World Class Soccer	Park Place Productions	Acclaim Entertainment	March 25, 1994	April 1994	May 19, 1994	
Championship Pool •Super Billiard: Championship Pool^{JP}	Bitmasters	Imagineer (JP); Mindscape (NA/PAL)	June 24, 1994	November 1993	1993	
The Chaos Engine •Soldiers of Fortune^{NA}	Bitmap Brothers	Spectrum HoloByte	Unreleased	December 1993	July 1994	
Chaos Seed [ja]	Neverland	Taito	March 15, 1996	Unreleased	Unreleased	
The Chessmaster	Eastridge Technology	Altron (JP); Mindscape (NA/PAL)	February 17, 1995	September 1991	1992	
Chester Cheetah: Too Cool to Fool	System Vision	Kaneko	Unreleased	December 1992	Unreleased	
Chester Cheetah: Wild Wild Quest	Kaneko	Kaneko	Unreleased	March 1994	Unreleased	
Chibi Maruko-chan: Harikiri 365-Nichi no Maki	Pop House; SAS Sakata	Epoch Co.	December 13, 1991	Unreleased	Unreleased	
Chibi Maruko-chan: Mezase! Minami no Island!!	Konami	Konami	December 1, 1995	Unreleased	Unreleased	
Chinhai	Pixel	Banpresto	September 22, 1995	Unreleased	Unreleased	
Chō Aniki: Bakuretsu Rantōden	Bits Laboratory	NCS Corp	September 22, 1995	Unreleased	Unreleased	
Chō Mahō Tairiku WOZZ	Red Company	Bullet-Proof Software	August 4, 1995	Unreleased	Unreleased	
Choplifter III	Beam Software	Victor Interactive Software (JP); Extreme Entertainment Group (NA); Ocean Software (PAL)	September 9, 1994	January 1994	1994	
Chrono Trigger	Square	Square	March 11, 1995	August 1995	Unreleased	
Chuck Rock	Core Design	Sony Imagesoft	Unreleased	November 1992	1992	
Classic Road	Opera House	Victor Interactive Software	October 29, 1993	Unreleased	Unreleased	
Classic Road II	Opera House	Victor Interactive Software	February 24, 1995	Unreleased	Unreleased	
ClayFighter	Visual Concepts	Interplay Entertainment	Unreleased	November 1993	May 26, 1994	
ClayFighter: Tournament Edition	Visual Concepts	Interplay Entertainment	Unreleased	May 1994	Unreleased	
ClayFighter 2: Judgment Clay	Interplay Entertainment	Interplay Entertainment	Unreleased	January 1995	May 23, 1995	
Claymates	Visual Concepts	Interplay Entertainment	Unreleased	March 1994	November 20, 1993	
Cliffhanger	Malibu Interactive	Sony Imagesoft	Unreleased	October 1993	1993	
Clock Tower	Human Entertainment	Human Entertainment	September 14, 1995	Unreleased	Unreleased	
ClockWerx	Axes Art Amuse	Tokuma Shoten	December 8, 1995	Unreleased	Unreleased	
Clue	Sculptured Software	Parker Brothers	Unreleased	July 1992	Unreleased	
College Football USA '97: The Road to New Orleans	High Score Productions	Black Pearl Software	Unreleased	December 1996	Unreleased	
College Slam	Iguana Entertainment	Acclaim Entertainment	Unreleased	January 1996	Unreleased	
Columns (Note: Digital release only (Nintendo Power). "Official Nintendo Power webpage". Nintendo. Archived from the original on December 31, 2002.)	Marigul Management	Media Factory	August 1, 1999	Unreleased	Unreleased	
The Combatribes	Technōs Japan	Technōs Japan (JP); American Technōs (NA)	December 23, 1992	March 1993	Unreleased	
Computer Nōryoku Kaiseki: Ultra Baken	Culture Brain	Culture Brain	May 26, 1995	Unreleased	Unreleased	
Congo's Caper •Tatakae Genshijin 2: Rookie no Bōken^{JP}	Data East	Data East	December 18, 1992	May 1993	1993	
Contra III: The Alien Wars •Super Probotector: Alien Rebels^{PAL} •Contra Spirits^{JP}	Konami	Konami	February 28, 1992	March 1992	November 19, 1992	
Conveni Wars Barcode Battler Senki: Super Senshi Shutsugeki Seyo!	Pop House; SAS Sakata	Epoch Co.	May 14, 1993	Unreleased	Unreleased	
Cool Spot	Virgin Interactive Entertainment	Virgin Interactive Entertainment	December 10, 1993	September 1993	February 24, 1994	
Cool World	Painting by Numbers	Ocean Software	Unreleased	February 1993	1992	
Coron Land	Aroma	Yumedia	August 25, 1995	Unreleased	Unreleased	
Cosmo Gang the Video	Namco	Namco	October 29, 1992	Unreleased	Unreleased	
Cosmo Police Galivan II: Arrow of Justice	Cream	Nichibutsu	June 11, 1993	Unreleased	Unreleased	
Crayon Shin-chan: Arashi wo yobu Enji	Sun L	Bandai	July 30, 1993	Unreleased	Unreleased	
Crayon Shin-chan: Nagagutsu Dobon	AIM	Bandai	September 27, 1996	Unreleased	Unreleased	
Crayon Shin-chan 2: Daimaō no Gyakushū	Sun L	Bandai	May 27, 1994	Unreleased	Unreleased	
Crystal Beans From Dungeon Explorer	Birthday	Hudson Soft	October 27, 1995	Unreleased	Unreleased	
Cu-On-Pa	T&E Soft	T&E Soft	December 20, 1996	Unreleased	Unreleased	
Cutthroat Island	Software Creations (UK)	Acclaim Entertainment	Unreleased	March 1996	1996	
Cyber Knight	Advance Communication Company	Tonkin House	October 30, 1992	Unreleased	Unreleased	
Cyber Knight II: Chikyū Teikoku no Yabō	Group SNE	Tonkin House	August 26, 1994	Unreleased	Unreleased	
Cyber Spin •Shinseiki GPX: Cyber Formula^{JP}	Takara	Takara	March 19, 1992	November 1992	Unreleased	
Cybernator •Jūsō Kihei Valken^{JP}	NCS Corp	Masaya (JP); Konami (NA); Palcom Software (PAL)	December 18, 1992	April 1993	1993	
Cyborg 009	BEC	Bandai	February 25, 1994	Unreleased	Unreleased	
D-Force •Dimension Force^{JP}	Asmik Ace Entertainment	Asmik Ace Entertainment	December 20, 1991	December 1991	Unreleased	
Daffy Duck: The Marvin Missions	ICOM Simulations	Sunsoft	Unreleased	October 1993	April 28, 1994	
Daibakushō Jinsei Gekijō	Taito	Taito	December 25, 1992	Unreleased	Unreleased	
Daibakushō Jinsei Gekijō: Dokidoki Seishun	Taito	Taito	July 30, 1993	Unreleased	Unreleased	
Daibakushō Jinsei Gekijō: Ooedo Nikki	Taito	Taito	November 25, 1994	Unreleased	Unreleased	
Daibakushō Jinsei Gekijō: Zukkoke Salary Man Hen	Taito	Taito	December 29, 1995	Unreleased	Unreleased	
Daikaijū Monogatari	Birthday	Hudson Soft	December 22, 1994	Unreleased	Unreleased	
Daikaijū Monogatari 2	AIM	Hudson Soft	August 2, 1996	Unreleased	Unreleased	
Daisenryaku Expert	SystemSoft Alpha	ASCII Entertainment	September 25, 1992	Unreleased	Unreleased	
Daisenryaku Expert WWII: War in Europe	SystemSoft Alpha	ASCII Entertainment	August 30, 1996	Unreleased	Unreleased	
Darius Twin	Taito	Taito	March 29, 1991	November 1991	April 22, 1993	
Dark Half	West One	Enix	May 31, 1996	Unreleased	Unreleased	
Dark Kingdom	Telenet Japan	Telenet Japan	April 29, 1994	Unreleased	Unreleased	
Dark Law: Meaning of Death	ASCII Entertainment; SAS Sakata	ASCII Entertainment	March 28, 1997	Unreleased	Unreleased	
Date Kimiko no Virtual Tennis	Jorudan	Yanoman	May 13, 1994	Unreleased	Unreleased	
David Crane's Amazing Tennis	Imagineering	Pack-In-Video (JP); Absolute Entertainment (NA); Electronic Arts (PAL)	December 18, 1992	November 1992	1992	
Daze Before Christmas	Funcom	Sunsoft	Unreleased	Cancelled	November 1, 1994	
Deae Tonosama Appare Ichiban	Sunsoft	Sunsoft	March 31, 1995	Unreleased	Unreleased	
Dear Boys	Kan's	Yutaka	October 28, 1994	Unreleased	Unreleased	
The Death and Return of Superman	Blizzard Entertainment	Sunsoft	Unreleased	August 1994	November 1994	
Death Brade	I'MAX	I'MAX	July 16, 1993	Unreleased	Unreleased	
Dekitate High School	C-Lab	Bullet-Proof Software	July 7, 1995	Unreleased	Unreleased	
Demolition Man	Alexandria	Acclaim Entertainment	Unreleased	August 1995	September 28, 1995	
Demon's Crest •Demon's Blazon Makaimura Monshō-hen^{JP}	Capcom	Capcom	October 21, 1994	November 1994	March 1, 1995	
Dennis the Menace •Dennis^{PAL}	Ocean Software	Ocean Software	Unreleased	December 1993	1993	
Der Langrisser	NCS Corp	NCS Corp	June 30, 1995	Unreleased	Unreleased	
Derby Jockey: Kishu Ō heno Michi	Graphic Research	Asmik Ace Entertainment	March 18, 1994	Unreleased	Unreleased	
Derby Jockey 2	Graphic Research	Asmik Ace Entertainment	September 29, 1995	Unreleased	Unreleased	
Derby Stallion II	ASCII Entertainment	ASCII Entertainment	February 18, 1994	Unreleased	Unreleased	
Derby Stallion III	ASCII Entertainment	ASCII Entertainment	January 20, 1995	Unreleased	Unreleased	
Derby Stallion '96	ASCII Entertainment	ASCII Entertainment	March 15, 1996	Unreleased	Unreleased	
Derby Stallion '98	ParityBit	Nintendo	September 1, 1998	Unreleased	Unreleased	
Desert Strike: Return to the Gulf	Visual Concepts	Electronic Arts Victor (JP); Electronic Arts (NA/PAL)	March 26, 1993	October 1992	May 27, 1993	
Dezaemon: Kaite Tsukutte Asoberu	Athena	Athena	September 20, 1994	Unreleased	Unreleased	
Dharma Dōjō	Metro	Den'Z	February 10, 1995	Unreleased	Unreleased	
Dig & Spike Volleyball •Volleyball Twin^{JP}	Tose	Tonkin House (JP); Hudson Soft (NA)	November 27, 1992	December 1993	Unreleased	
Dino Dini's Soccer	Eurocom Entertainment Software	Virgin Interactive Entertainment	Unreleased	Unreleased	November 10, 1994	
DinoCity •Dino Wars: Kyōryū Ōkoku heno Daibōken^{JP}	Irem	Irem	July 17, 1992	September 1992	1992	
Dirt Racer	MotiveTime	Elite Systems	Unreleased	Unreleased	May 31, 1995	
Dirt Trax FX	Sculptured Software	Acclaim Entertainment	Unreleased	June 1995	1995	
Dokapon 3-2-1: Arashi wo Yobu Yūjō	Asmik Ace Entertainment	Asmik Ace Entertainment	December 2, 1994	Unreleased	Unreleased	
Dokapon Gaiden: Honoo no Audition	Earthly Soft	Asmik Ace Entertainment	December 1, 1995	Unreleased	Unreleased	
Dolucky no Kusayakiu •Zoo Ball^{NA}	Zoom	Technōs Japan	December 17, 1993	Cancelled	Unreleased	
Dolucky no Puzzle Tour '94	Zoom	Imagineer	October 28, 1994	Unreleased	Unreleased	
Dolucky's A-League Soccer	Zoom	Imagineer	July 8, 1994	Unreleased	Unreleased	
Donald Duck no Mahō no Bōshi	Pop House; SAS Sakata	Epoch Co.	August 11, 1995	Unreleased	Unreleased	
Donkey Kong Country •Super Donkey Kong^{JP, KR}	Rare	Nintendo	November 26, 1994	November 21, 1994	November 24, 1994	
Donkey Kong Country 2: Diddy's Kong Quest •Super Donkey Kong 2: Dixie & Diddy^{JP, KR}	Rare	Nintendo	November 21, 1995	December 4, 1995	December 14, 1995	
Donkey Kong Country 3: Dixie Kong's Double Trouble! •Super Donkey Kong 3: Nazo no Krems Shima^{JP, KR}	Rare	Nintendo	November 23, 1996	November 18, 1996	December 13, 1996	
Doom	Sculptured Software	Imagineer (JP); Williams Entertainment (NA); Ocean Software (PAL)	March 1, 1996	September 1995	October 26, 1995	
Doom Troopers	Adrenalin Interactive	Playmates Interactive Entertainment	Unreleased	November 1995	Unreleased	
Doomsday Warrior •Taiketsu!! Brass Numbers^{JP}	Laser Soft	Laser Soft (JP); Renovation Products (NA)	November 20, 1992	April 1993	Unreleased	
Doraemon: Nobita to Yōsei no Kuni	Pop House; SAS Sakata	Epoch Co.	February 19, 1993	Unreleased	Unreleased	
Doraemon 2: Nobita no Toys Land Daibōken	Pop House; SAS Sakata	Epoch Co.	December 17, 1993	Unreleased	Unreleased	
Doraemon 3: Nobita to Toki no Hōgyoku	AIM	Epoch Co.	December 16, 1994	Unreleased	Unreleased	
Doraemon 4: Nobita to Tsuki no Ōkoku	Agenda	Epoch Co.	December 15, 1995	Unreleased	Unreleased	
DoReMi Fantasy: Milon no Dokidoki Daibōken	Hudson Soft	Hudson Soft	March 22, 1996	Unreleased	Unreleased	
Dossun! Ganseki Battle	I'MAX	I'MAX	December 16, 1994	Unreleased	Unreleased	
Double Dragon V: The Shadow Falls	Leland Interactive Media	Tradewest	Unreleased	August 5, 1994	July 10, 1994	
Dōkyūsei 2	ELF Corporation	Banpresto	December 1, 1997	Unreleased	Unreleased	
Down the World: Mervil's Ambition	ASCII Entertainment	ASCII Entertainment	September 30, 1994	Unreleased	Unreleased	
Downtown Nekketsu Baseball Monogatari: Baseball de Shōfuda! Kunio-kun	Technōs Japan	Technōs Japan	December 17, 1993	Unreleased	Unreleased	
Dr. Mario	Tose	Nintendo	June 1, 1998	Unreleased	Unreleased	
Dragon: The Bruce Lee Story		Acclaim Entertainment (NA); Virgin Interactive Entertainment (PAL)	Unreleased	July 1995	February 23, 1995	
Dragon Ball Z: Hyper Dimension	Tose	Bandai	March 29, 1996	Unreleased	February 1997	
Dragon Ball Z: Super Butōden •Dragon Ball Z^{FR}	Tose	Bandai	March 20, 1993	Unreleased	November 30, 1993	
Dragon Ball Z: Super Butōden 2 •Dragon Ball Z 2: la Légende Saien^{FR}	Tose	Bandai	December 17, 1993	Unreleased	June 1994	
Dragon Ball Z: Super Butōden 3 •Dragon Ball Z: Chomutujeon^{KR} •Dragon Ball Z: Ultime Menace ^{FR}	Tose	Bandai	September 29, 1994	Unreleased	March 1995	
Dragon Ball Z: Super Gokuden Totsugeki Hen	Tose	Bandai	March 24, 1995	Unreleased	Unreleased	
Dragon Ball Z: Super Gokuden Kakusei Hen	Tose	Bandai	September 22, 1995	Unreleased	Unreleased	
Dragon Ball Z: Super Saiya Densetsu	Tose	Bandai	January 25, 1992	Unreleased	Unreleased	
Dragon Knight 4	ELF Corporation	Banpresto	December 27, 1996	Unreleased	Unreleased	
Dragon Quest I & II	Chunsoft	Enix	December 18, 1993	Unreleased	Unreleased	
Dragon Quest III: Soshite Densetsu e...	Heartbeat	Enix	December 6, 1996	Unreleased	Unreleased	
Dragon Quest V: Tenkū no Hanayome •Dragon Warrior V^{NA}	Chunsoft	Enix	September 27, 1992	Cancelled	Unreleased	
Dragon Quest VI: Maboroshi no Daichi	Heartbeat	Enix	December 9, 1995	Unreleased	Unreleased	
Dragon Slayer: Eiyū Densetsu	Falcom	Epoch Co.	February 14, 1992	Unreleased	Unreleased	
Dragon Slayer: Eiyū Densetsu II	Falcom	Epoch Co.	June 4, 1993	Unreleased	Unreleased	
Dragon View •Super Drakkhen^{JP}	Kemco	Kemco	August 26, 1994	November 1994	Unreleased	
Dragon's Earth	Human Entertainment	Human Entertainment	January 22, 1993	Unreleased	Unreleased	
Dragon's Lair •Dragon's Magic^{JP}	MotiveTime	Konami (JP); Data East (NA); Elite Systems (PAL)	June 25, 1993	February 1993	1993	
Drakkhen	Kemco	Kemco (JP/PAL); Seika Corporation (NA)	May 24, 1991	September 1991	1992	
Dream Basketball: Dunk & Hoop	Human Entertainment	Human Entertainment	November 18, 1994	Unreleased	Unreleased	
Dream TV	Bits Studios	Triffix	Unreleased	April 1994	Unreleased	
Dual Orb	I'MAX	I'MAX	April 16, 1993	Unreleased	Unreleased	
Dual Orb II	I'MAX	I'MAX	December 29, 1994	Unreleased	Unreleased	
The Duel: Test Drive II	Distinctive Software	Ballistic	Unreleased	December 1992	1992	
Dungeon Master	Software Heaven; FTL Games	JVC Musical Industries	December 20, 1991	June 1993	1993	
DunQuest: Majin Fūin no Densetsu	Technōs Japan	Technōs Japan	July 21, 1995	Unreleased	Unreleased	
Dynamic Stadium	Electronics Application	Sammy Corporation	November 26, 1993	Unreleased	Unreleased	
Dynamite: The Las Vegas	Micro Factory	Virgin Interactive Entertainment	April 28, 1994	Unreleased	Unreleased	
E.V.O.: Search for Eden •46 Okunen Monogatari: Harukanaru Eden e^{JP}	Almanic	Enix	December 21, 1992	July 1993	Unreleased	
Earth Defense Force •Super E.D.F.^{JP}	Jaleco	Jaleco	October 25, 1991	January 1992	1992	
Earth Light	Hudson Soft	Hudson Soft	July 24, 1992	Unreleased	Unreleased	
Earth Light: Luna Strike	Hudson Soft	Hudson Soft	July 26, 1996	Unreleased	Unreleased	
EarthBound •Mother 2: Gīgu no Gyakushū^{JP}	Ape; HAL Laboratory	Nintendo	August 27, 1994	June 5, 1995	Unreleased	
Earthworm Jim	Shiny Entertainment	Takara (JP); Playmates Interactive Entertainment (NA); Virgin Interactive Entertainment (PAL)	June 23, 1995	October 1994	December 16, 1994	
Earthworm Jim 2	Shiny Entertainment	Playmates Interactive Entertainment (NA); Virgin Interactive Entertainment (PAL)	Unreleased	November 15, 1995	January 25, 1996	
Edo no Kiba	Riot	Micro World	March 12, 1993	Unreleased	Unreleased	
Eek! The Cat	CTA Developments	Ocean Software	Unreleased	August 1994	1994	
Elfaria	Red Company	Hudson Soft	January 3, 1993	Unreleased	Unreleased	
Elfaria 2: The Quest of the Meld	Red Company	Hudson Soft	June 9, 1995	Unreleased	Unreleased	
Emerald Dragon	Alfa System	MediaWorks	July 28, 1995	Unreleased	Unreleased	
EMIT Vol. 1	Koei	Koei	March 25, 1995	Unreleased	Unreleased	
EMIT Vol. 2	Koei	Koei	March 25, 1995	Unreleased	Unreleased	
EMIT Vol. 3	Koei	Koei	March 25, 1995	Unreleased	Unreleased	
Emmitt Smith Football	Bitmasters	JVC Musical Industries	Unreleased	November 1995	Unreleased	
Energy Breaker	Neverland	Taito	July 26, 1996	Unreleased	Unreleased	
Equinox •Solstice II^{JP}	Software Creations	Epic/Sony Records (JP); Sony Imagesoft (NA/PAL)	November 12, 1993	March 1994	March 25, 1994	
Esparks: Ijikū Kara no Raihōsha		Tomy	March 31, 1995	Unreleased	Unreleased	
ESPN Baseball Tonight	Park Place Productions	Sony Imagesoft	Unreleased	May 1994	November 1994	
ESPN National Hockey Night	Park Place Productions	Sony Imagesoft	Unreleased	December 1994	Unreleased	
ESPN SpeedWorld	Park Place Productions	Sony Imagesoft	Unreleased	November 1994	Unreleased	
ESPN Sunday Night NFL	Absolute Entertainment	Sony Imagesoft	Unreleased	November 1994	Unreleased	
Eternal Filena		Tokuma Shoten	February 25, 1995	Unreleased	Unreleased	
Extra Innings •Hakunetsu Pro Yakyū: Ganba League^{JP}	Sting Entertainment	Sony Music Entertainment Japan (JP); Sony Imagesoft (NA)	August 9, 1991	March 1992	Unreleased	
F-1 Grand Prix	Video System	Video System	April 28, 1992	Unreleased	Unreleased	
F-1 Grand Prix Part II	Video System	Video System	February 26, 1993	Unreleased	Unreleased	
F-1 Grand Prix Part III	Video System	Video System	April 22, 1994	Unreleased	Unreleased	
F-Zero	Nintendo EAD	Nintendo	November 21, 1990	August 23, 1991	April 11, 1992	
F1 Pole Position •Human Grand Prix^{JP}	Human Entertainment	Human Entertainment (JP); Ubisoft (NA/PAL)	November 20, 1992	September 1993	December 1993	
F1 Pole Position 2 •Human Grand Prix II^{JP}	Human Entertainment	Human Entertainment (JP); Ubisoft (PAL)	December 24, 1993	Unreleased	December 29, 1993	
F1 ROC: Race of Champions •Exhaust Heat^{PAL, JP}	SETA	SETA (JP/NA); Ocean Software (PAL)	February 21, 1992	September 1992	1992	
F1 ROC II: Race of Champions •Exhaust Heat II: F-1 Driver no Kiseki^{JP}	SETA	SETA	March 5, 1993	July 1994	Unreleased	
F1 World Championship Edition	Domark	Acclaim Entertainment	Unreleased	Unreleased	January 1, 1995	
Faceball 2000	Xanth Software	Bullet-Proof Software	Unreleased	September 1992	Unreleased	
Famicom Bunko: Hajimari no Mori	Pax Softonica	Nintendo	July 1, 1999	Unreleased	Unreleased	
Famicom Tantei Club Part II: Ushiro ni Tatsu Shōjo	Nintendo R&D1	Nintendo	April 1, 1998	Unreleased	Unreleased	
Family Dog	Imagineering	Malibu Games	Unreleased	June 1993	1993	
Family Feud	Imagineering	GameTek	Unreleased	September 1993	Unreleased	
Farland Story: Yottsu no Fūin	Technical Group Laboratory	Banpresto	February 24, 1995	Unreleased	Unreleased	
Farland Story 2: Dance of Destruction	Technical Group Laboratory	Banpresto	December 22, 1995	Unreleased	Unreleased	
Fatal Fury •Garō Densetsu Shukumei no Tatakai^{JP}	Takara	Takara	November 27, 1992	April 1993	1993	
Fatal Fury 2 •Garō Densetsu 2 Aratanaru Tatakai^{JP}	Takara	Takara	November 26, 1993	April 1994	1994	
Fatal Fury Special •Garō Densetsu Special^{JP}	Monolith	Takara	July 29, 1994	April 1995	1995	
Feda: The Emblem of Justice	Max Entertainment	Yanoman	October 28, 1994	Unreleased	Unreleased	
Fever Pitch Soccer •Head-On Soccer^{NA}	U.S. Gold	U.S. Gold	Unreleased	September 1995	1995	
FIFA International Soccer	Extended Play Productions	Victor Interactive Software (JP); EA Sports (NA/PAL)	June 17, 1994	May 1994	June 23, 1994	
FIFA Soccer 96	Extended Play Productions; Probe Entertainment	EA Sports	Unreleased	July 1995	November 23, 1995	
FIFA 97: Gold Edition	Electronic Arts	EA Sports	Unreleased	November 1996	November 22, 1996	
FIFA: Road to World Cup 98	Electronic Arts	EA Sports	Unreleased	Unreleased	September 3, 1997	
Fighter's History	Data East	Data East	May 27, 1994	August 1994	Unreleased	
Fighter's History: Mizoguchi Kiki Ippatsu!!	Data East	Data East	February 17, 1995	Unreleased	Unreleased	
Final Fantasy IV •Final Fantasy II^{NA}	Square	Square	July 19, 1991	November 1991	Unreleased	
Final Fantasy IV Easy Type	Square	Square	October 29, 1991	Unreleased	Unreleased	
Final Fantasy V	Square	Square	December 6, 1992	Unreleased	Unreleased	
Final Fantasy VI •Final Fantasy III^{NA}	Square	Square	April 2, 1994	October 1994	Unreleased	
Final Fantasy Mystic Quest •Mystic Quest Legend^{PAL} •Final Fantasy USA: Mystic Quest^{JP}	Square	Square (JP/NA); Nintendo (PAL)	September 10, 1993	October 1992	October 15, 1993	
Final Fight	Capcom	Capcom	December 21, 1990	November 1991	December 10, 1992	
Final Fight 2	Capcom	Capcom	May 22, 1993	August 1993	December 1993	
Final Fight 3 •Final Fight Tough^{JP}	Capcom	Capcom	December 22, 1995	December 1995	March 13, 1996	
Final Fight Guy	Capcom	Capcom	March 20, 1992	June 1994	Unreleased	
Final Set	Human Entertainment	Human Entertainment	September 17, 1993	Unreleased	Unreleased	
Final Stretch	Genki	LOZC G. Amusements	November 12, 1993	Unreleased	Unreleased	
Fire Emblem: Mystery of the Emblem	Intelligent Systems	Nintendo	January 21, 1994	Unreleased	Unreleased	
Fire Emblem: Genealogy of the Holy War	Intelligent Systems	Nintendo	May 14, 1996	Unreleased	Unreleased	
Fire Emblem: Thracia 776	Intelligent Systems	Nintendo	January 21, 2000	Unreleased	Unreleased	
Fire Pro Joshi: All Star Dream Slam		Human Entertainment	July 22, 1994	Unreleased	Unreleased	
The Firemen	Human Entertainment	Human Entertainment	September 9, 1994	Unreleased	March 1995	
Firestriker •Holy Striker^{JP}	Axes Art Amuse	Hect (JP); DTMC (NA)	December 17, 1993	October 1994	Unreleased	
First Queen: Ornic Senki •First Queen^{NA}		Culture Brain	March 11, 1994	Cancelled	Unreleased	
First Samurai	Vivid Image	Kemco	July 2, 1993	July 1993	1993	
Fishing Kōshien	A-Wave	King Records	May 31, 1996	Unreleased	Unreleased	
Flashback •Flashback: The Quest for Identity^{NA}	Delphine Software International; Tiertex Design Studios	Sunsoft (JP); U.S. Gold (NA/PAL)	December 22, 1993	February 1994	1994	
The Flintstones	Ocean Software	Ocean Software	Unreleased	February 1995	April 1995	
The Flintstones: The Treasure of Sierra Madrock	Taito; Sol Corporation	Taito	August 12, 1994	March 1994	June 23, 1994	
Flying Hero: Bugyuru no Daibōken	Sting Entertainment	SOFEL	December 18, 1992	Unreleased	Unreleased	
Football Fury •Ultimate Football^{JP}	Aicom	Sammy Corporation (JP); American Sammy (NA)	July 24, 1992	October 1993	Unreleased	
Foreman For Real	Software Creations	Acclaim Entertainment	October 27, 1995	September 1995	September 28, 1995	
Fortune Quest: Dice wo Korogase	Natsume Co., Ltd.	Zamuse	April 28, 1994	Unreleased	Unreleased	
Frank Thomas' Big Hurt Baseball; Big Hurt Baseball^{JP}	Iguana Entertainment	Acclaim Entertainment	December 1, 1995	November 1995	1995	
Frantic Flea	Haus Teknikka	GameTek	Unreleased	April 1996	1996	
Frogger	Morning Star Multimedia	Majesco	Unreleased	October 6, 1998	Unreleased	
From TV Animation Slam Dunk: SD Heat Up!!	Tose	Bandai	October 27, 1995	Unreleased	Unreleased	
From TV Animation Slam Dunk 2: IH Yosen Kanzenhan!!	Tose	Bandai	February 24, 1995	Unreleased	Unreleased	
From TV Animation Slam Dunk: Yonkyo Taiketsu!!	Tose	Bandai	March 26, 1994	Unreleased	Unreleased	
Front Mission	G-Craft	Square	February 23, 1995	Unreleased	Unreleased	
Front Mission Series: Gun Hazard	Omiya Soft	Square	February 23, 1996	Unreleased	Unreleased	
Full Throttle: All-American Racing •Full Power^{JP}	Gremlin Interactive	Coconuts Japan (JP); Cybersoft (NA); GameTek (PAL)	December 16, 1994	January 1995	1994	
Fun 'n Games	Leland Interactive Media	Tradewest	Unreleased	August 1994	May 25, 1994	
Funaki Masakatsu no Hybrid Wrestler: Tōgi Denshō	Technōs Japan	Technōs Japan	October 21, 1994	Unreleased	Unreleased	
Fune Tarō		Victor Interactive Software	August 1, 1997	Unreleased	Unreleased	
Furuta Atsuya no Simulation Pro Yakyū 2	Hect	Hect	August 24, 1996	Unreleased	Unreleased	
Fushigi no Dungeon 2: Furai no Shiren	Chunsoft	Chunsoft	December 1, 1995	Unreleased	Unreleased	
G-O-D: Mezame yoto Yobu Koe ga Kikoe	Infinity Co., Ltd	Imagineer	December 20, 1996	Unreleased	Unreleased	
Gaia Saver: Hero Saidai no Sakusen	Arc System Works	Banpresto	January 28, 1994	Unreleased	Unreleased	
Gakkō de Atta Kowai Hanashi	Pandora Box	Banpresto	August 4, 1995	Unreleased	Unreleased	
Galaxy Robo	Copya Systems	Imagineer	March 11, 1994	Unreleased	Unreleased	
Galaxy Wars	C-Lab	Imagineer	January 13, 1995	Unreleased	Unreleased	
Gambler Jikochūshinha: Mahjong Kōisen	Bits Laboratory	Palsoft	September 25, 1992	Unreleased	Unreleased	
Gambler Jikochūshinha 2: Dorapon Quest	Bits Laboratory	Pack-In-Video	March 18, 1994	Unreleased	Unreleased	
Gambling Hōrōki		VAP	March 22, 1996	Unreleased	Unreleased	
Game no Tatsujin	Affect	Sunsoft	August 11, 1995	Unreleased	Unreleased	
Game no Tetsujin: The Shanghai		Sunsoft	October 13, 1995	Unreleased	Unreleased	
Gamera: Gyaosu Gekimetsu Sakusen	Axes Art Amuse	Sammy Corporation	June 30, 1995	Unreleased	Unreleased	
Gan Gan Ganchan	Team Mental Care	Magifact	October 27, 1995	Unreleased	Unreleased	
Ganbare Daiku no Gensan	Irem	Irem	December 22, 1993	Unreleased	Unreleased	
Ganbare Goemon 2: Kiteretsu Shōgun McGuiness	Konami	Konami	December 22, 1993	Unreleased	Unreleased	
Ganbare Goemon 3: Shishi Jūrokubē no Karakuri Manjigatame	Konami	Konami	December 16, 1994	Unreleased	Unreleased	
Ganbare Goemon Kirakira Dōchū: Boku ga Dancer ni Natta Wake	Konami	Konami	December 22, 1995	Unreleased	Unreleased	
Ganso Pachi-Slot Nippon'ichi		Coconuts Japan	November 25, 1994	Unreleased	Unreleased	
Ganso Pachinko Ō		Coconuts Japan	December 22, 1994	Unreleased	Unreleased	
Garry Kitchen's Super Battletank: War in the Gulf •Super Battletank^{JP, PAL}	Imagineering	Pack-In-Video (JP); Absolute Entertainment (NA/PAL)	April 23, 1993	June 1992	March 18, 1993	
Gdleen	Jorudan	SETA	May 28, 1991	Cancelled	Unreleased	
Gegege no Kitarō: Fukkatsu! Tenma Daiō •Kitaro's Adventure^{NA}	BEC	Bandai	February 5, 1993	Cancelled	Unreleased	
Gegege no Kitarō: Yōkai Donjara	Tom Create	Bandai	July 19, 1996	Unreleased	Unreleased	
Gekitotsu Dangan Jidōsha Kessen: Battle Mobile	System Sacom	System Sacom	June 25, 1993	Unreleased	Unreleased	
Gekisō Sentai Carranger: Zenkai!! Racer Senshi	Natsume Co., Ltd.	Bandai	August 23, 1996	Unreleased	Unreleased	
Gekitō Burning Pro Wrestling	Ukiyotei	Bullet-Proof Software	October 6, 1995	Unreleased	Unreleased	
Gemfire •Super Royal Blood^{JP}	Koei	Koei	October 22, 1992	December 1992	Unreleased	
Genghis Khan II: Clan of the Gray Wolf •Super Aoki Ōkami to Shiroki Mejika: Genchō Hishi^{JP}	Koei	Koei	March 25, 1993	December 1993	Unreleased	
Genjū Ryodan	Crea-Tech	Axela	June 1, 1998	Unreleased	Unreleased	
Genocide 2	Bits Studios	Kemco	August 5, 1994	Cancelled	Unreleased	
George Foreman's KO Boxing	Beam Software	Acclaim Entertainment	Unreleased	September 1992	Unreleased	
Getsumen no Anubis	Multimedia Intelligence Transfer	Imagineer	December 22, 1995	Unreleased	Unreleased	
Ghost Chaser Densei	Winkysoft	Banpresto	September 23, 1994	Unreleased	Unreleased	
Ghost Sweeper Mikami: Joreishi wa Nice Body	Natsume Co., Ltd.	Banalex	September 23, 1993	Unreleased	Unreleased	
Ghoul Patrol	LucasArts	JVC Musical Industries	May 26, 1995	November 1994	1994	
Ginga Eiyū Densetsu: Senjutsu Simulation	Advance Communication Company	Tokuma Shoten	September 25, 1992	Unreleased	Unreleased	
Ginga Sengoku Gun'yūden Rai	Angel	Angel	March 8, 1996	Unreleased	Unreleased	
Gintama Oyakata no Jissen Pachinko Hisshōhō	Sammy Corporation	Sammy Corporation	February 17, 1995	Unreleased	Unreleased	
Gionbana	Nichibutsu	Nichibutsu	December 16, 1994	Unreleased	Unreleased	
Go! Go! Ackman	Aspect	Banpresto	December 23, 1994	Unreleased	Unreleased	
Go! Go! Ackman 2	Aspect	Banpresto	July 21, 1995	Unreleased	Unreleased	
Go! Go! Ackman 3	Aspect	Banpresto	December 15, 1995	Unreleased	Unreleased	
Go! Go! Dodge League	Now Production; Mebio Software	Pack-In-Video	September 24, 1993	Unreleased	Unreleased	
Goal! •Super Goal!^{PAL} •Super Cup Soccer^{JP}	Tose	Jaleco	April 24, 1992	December 1992	1992	
Gods	Bitmap Brothers	Mindscape	Unreleased	December 1992	1992	
Godzilla: Kaijū Daikessen •Godzilla: Destroy All Monsters^{NA}	Alfa System	Toho	December 9, 1994	Cancelled	Unreleased	
Gokinjo Bōkentai	ITL	Pioneer LDC	May 24, 1996	Unreleased	Unreleased	
Gokujō Parodius ～Kako no Eikō o Motomete～	Konami	Konami	November 25, 1994	Unreleased	Unreleased	
Gon	Tose	Bandai	November 11, 1994	Unreleased	Unreleased	
Goof Troop •Goofy to Max: Kaizoku Shima no Daibōken^{JP}	Capcom	Capcom	July 22, 1994	July 1993	November 25, 1993	
GP-1	Atlus	Atlus	June 25, 1993	September 1993	1993	
GP-1: Part II •GP-1 Rapid Stream^{JP}	Atlus	Atlus	November 18, 1994	December 1994	Unreleased	
Gradius III	Konami	Konami	December 21, 1990	August 23, 1991	Unreleased	
Granhistoria: Genshi Sekaiki	J-Force	Banpresto	June 30, 1995	Unreleased	Unreleased	
The Great Battle II: Last Fighter Twin		Banpresto	March 27, 1992	Unreleased	Unreleased	
The Great Battle III	Sun L	Banpresto	March 26, 1993	Unreleased	Unreleased	
The Great Battle IV	Sun L	Banpresto	December 17, 1994	Unreleased	Unreleased	
The Great Battle V	Sun L	Banpresto	December 22, 1995	Unreleased	Unreleased	
The Great Battle Gaiden 2: Matsuri da Wasshoi		Banpresto	January 28, 1994	Unreleased	Unreleased	
The Great Circus Mystery Starring Mickey & Minnie •Mickey to Minnie: Magical Adventure 2^{JP}	Capcom	Capcom	November 11, 1994	October 1994	April 27, 1995	
The Great Waldo Search	Radiance Software	THQ	Unreleased	June 1993	Unreleased	
GT Racing	Imagineer	Imagineer	March 29, 1996	Unreleased	Unreleased	
GunForce	Bits Studios	Irem	November 27, 1992	November 1992	Unreleased	
Gunple: Gunman's Proof	Lenar	ASCII Entertainment	January 31, 1997	Unreleased	Unreleased	
Gurume Sentai Barayarō	Fupac; Winds	Virgin Interactive Entertainment	September 29, 1995	Unreleased	Unreleased	
Habu Meijin no Omoshiro Shōgi	Access	Tomy	March 31, 1995	Unreleased	Unreleased	
Hagane: The Final Conflict •HAGANE^{JP}	CAProduction; Red Company	Hudson Soft	November 18, 1994	June 1995	April 1995	
Haisei Mahjong Ryōga		ASCII Entertainment	April 28, 1995	Unreleased	Unreleased	
Hakunetsu Pro Yakyū '93: Ganba League	Sting Entertainment	Epic/Sony Records	December 11, 1992	Unreleased	Unreleased	
Hakunetsu Pro Yakyū '94: Ganba League 3		Epic/Sony Records	December 10, 1993	Unreleased	Unreleased	
Hal's Hole in One Golf •Jumbo Ozaki no Hole In One^{JP}	HAL Laboratory	HAL Laboratory	February 23, 1991	September 1991	October 22, 1992	
Hamelin no Violin Hiki	Daft	Enix	September 28, 1995	Unreleased	Unreleased	
HammerLock Wrestling •Tenryū Genichiro no Pro Wrestling Revolution^{JP}	Jaleco	Jaleco	September 30, 1994	October 1994	Unreleased	
Hana no Keiji: Kumo no Kanata ni	Tose	Yojigen	November 18, 1994	Unreleased	Unreleased	
Hanafuda Ō	Electronics Application	Coconuts Japan	December 16, 1994	Unreleased	Unreleased	
Hanjuku Hero: Aa, Sekaiyo Hanjukunare...!	Square	Square	December 19, 1992	Unreleased	Unreleased	
Hanna Barbera's Turbo Toons	Empire Interactive	Empire Interactive	Unreleased	Cancelled	November 1994	
Haō Taikei Ryū Knight: Lord of Paladin	Japan Art Media	Bandai	December 22, 1994	Unreleased	Unreleased	
Hardball III	Accolade	Accolade	Unreleased	June 1994	Unreleased	
Harley's Humongous Adventure •Kagakusha Harley no Haran Banjō^{JP}	Visual Concepts	Altron (JP); Hi Tech Expressions (NA/PAL)	October 28, 1994	February 1993	1993	
Harukanaru Augusta	T&E Soft	T&E Soft	April 5, 1991	Unreleased	Unreleased	
Harukanaru Augusta 2: Masters	T&E Soft	T&E Soft	September 22, 1993	Unreleased	Unreleased	
Harukanaru Augusta 3: Masters New	T&E Soft	T&E Soft	December 8, 1995	Unreleased	Unreleased	
Harvest Moon •Bokujō Monogatari^{JP}	Pack-In-Video	Pack-In-Video (JP); Natsume Inc. (NA); Nintendo (PAL)	August 9, 1996	June 1997	January 29, 1998	
Hashire Hebereke	Sunsoft	Sunsoft	December 22, 1994	Unreleased	Unreleased	
Hat Trick Hero 2 •Super Soccer Champ 2^{NA}	Neverland	Taito	July 29, 1994	Cancelled	Unreleased	
Hatayama Hatch no Pro Yakyū News! Jitsumei Han	Agenda	Epoch Co.	October 29, 1993	Unreleased	Unreleased	
Hayashi Kaihō Kudan no Igo Ōdō		ASK	March 22, 1996	Unreleased	Unreleased	
Hayazashi Nidan Morita Shogi	Random House	SETA	June 18, 1993	Unreleased	Unreleased	
Hayazashi Nidan Morita Shogi 2	Random House	SETA	May 26, 1995	Unreleased	Unreleased	
Hebereke no Oishii Puzzle wa Irimasen ka		Sunsoft	August 31, 1994	Unreleased	Unreleased	
Hebereke's Popoitto •Popoitto Hebereke^{JP}	Sunsoft	Sunsoft	July 28, 1995	Unreleased	September 30, 1995	
Hebereke's Popoon	Sunsoft	Sunsoft	December 22, 1993	Unreleased	February 22, 1994	
Heian Fūunden	Natsume Co., Ltd.	KSS	September 29, 1995	Unreleased	Unreleased	
Heisei Gunjin Shōgi		Carrozzeria	January 26, 1996	Unreleased	Unreleased	
Heisei Inu Monogatari Bow: Pop'n Smash!!		Takara	April 28, 1994	Unreleased	Unreleased	
Heisei Shin Onigashima (Part 1)		Nintendo	May 23, 1998	Unreleased	Unreleased	
Heisei Shin Onigashima (Part 2)		Nintendo	May 23, 1998	Unreleased	Unreleased	
Heiwa Pachinko World	Office Kōkan	Shōei	February 24, 1995	Unreleased	Unreleased	
Heiwa Pachinko World 2		Shōei	September 29, 1995	Unreleased	Unreleased	
Heiwa Pachinko World 3		Shōei	April 26, 1996	Unreleased	Unreleased	
Heiwa Parlor! Mini 8: Pachinko Jikki Simulation Game		Telenet Japan	January 30, 1998	Unreleased	Unreleased	
Heracles no Eikō III	Data East	Data East	April 24, 1992	Unreleased	Unreleased	
Heracles no Eikō IV: Kamigami kara no Okurimono	Data East	Data East	October 21, 1994	Unreleased	Unreleased	
Hero Senki: Project Olympus	Winkysoft	Banpresto	November 20, 1992	Unreleased	Unreleased	
Higashio Osamu Kanshū Super Pro Yakyū Stadium	C-Lab	Tokuma Shoten	September 30, 1993	Unreleased	Unreleased	
Hiōden: Mamono-tachi tono Chikai	Wolf Team	Wolf Team	February 11, 1994	Unreleased	Unreleased	
Hiryū no Ken S: Hyper Version	Culture Brain	Culture Brain	December 11, 1992	Unreleased	Unreleased	
Hissatsu Pachinko Collection		Sunsoft	October 21, 1994	Unreleased	Unreleased	
Hissatsu Pachinko Collection 2		Sunsoft	March 24, 1995	Unreleased	Unreleased	
Hissatsu Pachinko Collection 3		Sunsoft	November 2, 1995	Unreleased	Unreleased	
Hissatsu Pachinko Collection 4		Sunsoft	August 30, 1996	Unreleased	Unreleased	
Hisshō 777 Fighter: Pachi-Slot Ryūgū Densetsu	Jorudan	VAP	January 14, 1994	Unreleased	Unreleased	
Hisshō 777 Fighter II: Pachi-Slot Maruhi Jōhō	Jorudan	VAP	August 19, 1994	Unreleased	Unreleased	
Hisshō 777 Fighter III: Kokuryū Ō no Fukkatsu	Jorudan	VAP	September 15, 1995	Unreleased	Unreleased	
Hisshō Pachi-Slot Fun		Pow	December 16, 1994	Unreleased	Unreleased	
Hit the Ice	Taito	Taito	Unreleased	February 1993	Unreleased	
Hokuto no Ken 5 : Tenma Ryūsei Den: Ai Zesshō	Shōei	Toei Animation	July 10, 1992	Unreleased	Unreleased	
Hokuto no Ken 6 : Gekitō Denshōken: Haō e no Michi	Shōei	Toei Animation	November 20, 1992	Unreleased	Unreleased	
Hokuto no Ken 7 : Seiken Retsuden: Denshōsha e no Michi	Shōei	Toei Animation	December 24, 1993	Unreleased	Unreleased	
Holy Umbrella: Dondera no Mubō	Earthly Soft	Naxat Soft	September 25, 1995	Unreleased	Unreleased	
Home Alone	Imagineering	Altron (JP); THQ (NA/PAL)	August 11, 1992	December 1991	1992	
Home Alone 2: Lost in New York	Imagineering	THQ	Unreleased	October 1992	1993	
Home Improvement: Power Tool Pursuit!	Imagineering	Absolute Entertainment	Unreleased	November 1994	Unreleased	
Honkaku Mahjong: Tetsuman	Syscom	Naxat Soft	September 30, 1993	Unreleased	Unreleased	
Honkaku Mahjong: Tetsuman II	Khaos	Naxat Soft	October 21, 1994	Unreleased	Unreleased	
Honkaku Shōgi: Fūunji Ryūō	Aisystem Tokyo	Virgin Interactive Entertainment	December 22, 1994	Unreleased	Unreleased	
Honkakuha Igo: Gosei	Aisystem Tokyo	Taito	October 28, 1994	Unreleased	Unreleased	
Honke Hanafuda		Imagineer	September 22, 1994	Unreleased	Unreleased	
Honke Sankyo Fever: Jikkyō Simulation	Vistec	Den'Z	June 10, 1995	Unreleased	Unreleased	
Honke Sankyo Fever: Jikkyō Simulation 2	Vistec	Boss Communications	December 15, 1995	Unreleased	Unreleased	
Honke Sankyo Fever: Jikkyō Simulation 3	Vistec	Boss Communications	August 30, 1996	Unreleased	Unreleased	
Honō no Dōkyūji: Dodge Danpei		Sunsoft	July 31, 1992	Unreleased	Unreleased	
Hook	Ukiyotei	Epic/Sony Records (JP); Sony Imagesoft (NA/PAL)	July 17, 1992	October 1992	November 23, 1993	
Hōrai Gakuen no Bōken!	Dynamite	J-Wing	April 19, 1996	Unreleased	Unreleased	
Hōkago in Beppin Jogakuin	Access	Imagineer	February 3, 1995	Unreleased	Unreleased	
Human Baseball	Human Entertainment	Human Entertainment	August 6, 1993	Unreleased	Unreleased	
Human Grand Prix III: F1 Triple Battle	Human Entertainment	Human Entertainment	September 30, 1994	Unreleased	Unreleased	
Human Grand Prix IV: F1 Dream Battle	Human Entertainment	Human Entertainment	August 25, 1995	Unreleased	Unreleased	
The Humans	Imagitec Design	GameTek	Unreleased	Cancelled	December 31, 1993	
Hungry Dinosaurs •Harapeko Bakka^{JP}	Magical Company	Sunsoft	October 19, 1994	Unreleased	January 3, 1995	
The Hunt for Red October	Riedel Software Productions	Altron (JP); Hi Tech Expressions (NA/PAL)	October 1, 1993	January 1993	1993	
Hurricanes	Probe Entertainment	U.S. Gold	Unreleased	December 1994	1995	
Hyper Battle Game: Zen Nihon GT Senshuken	C.P. Brain	Banpresto	September 29, 1995	Unreleased	Unreleased	
Hyper Iria	Tam Tam	Banpresto	October 13, 1995	Unreleased	Unreleased	
Hyper V-Ball •Super Volley II^{JP}	Video System	Video System (JP); MC O'River (NA); Ubisoft (PAL)	December 25, 1992	June 1994	1994	
HyperZone	HAL Laboratory	HAL Laboratory	August 31, 1991	September 1991	1992	
Idea no Hi	Office Kōkan	Shōei	March 18, 1994	Unreleased	Unreleased	
The Ignition Factor •Fire Fighting^{JP}	Jaleco	Jaleco	November 1, 1994	January 1995	Unreleased	
Igo Club		Hect	January 26, 1996	Unreleased	Unreleased	
Ihatovo Monogatari	Hect	Hect	March 5, 1993	Unreleased	Unreleased	
Illusion of Gaia •Illusion of Time^{PAL} •Gaia Gensōki^{JP}	Quintet	Enix (JP); Nintendo (NA/PAL)	November 27, 1993	September 26, 1994	June 21, 1995	
Illvanian no Shiro		Nippon Clary Business	October 28, 1994	Unreleased	Unreleased	
Imperium •Kidō Sōkō Daion^{JP}	Jorudan	Vic Tokai	December 14, 1992	November 1992	Unreleased	
Inazuma Serve da!! Super Beach Volley		Virgin Interactive Entertainment	August 4, 1995	Unreleased	Unreleased	
Incantation	Titus Software	Titus Software	Unreleased	December 1996	1996	
The Incredible Crash Dummies •The Incredible Crash Dummies: Dr. Zub wo Sukuidase^{JP}	Gray Matter	Acclaim Entertainment (JP); LJN (NA/PAL)	September 30, 1994	October 1993	1993	
The Incredible Hulk	Probe Entertainment	U.S. Gold	Unreleased	August 1994	1993	
Indiana Jones' Greatest Adventures	Factor 5	JVC Musical Industries / LucasArts	July 28, 1995	October 1994	March 30, 1995	
Inindo: Way of the Ninja •Super Inindo: Datō Nobunaga^{JP}	Koei	Koei	March 19, 1992	March 1993	Unreleased	
Inspector Gadget	AIM	Hudson Soft	Unreleased	December 1993	Unreleased	
International Sensible Soccer: World Champions •Championship Soccer '94^{NA}	Sensible Software	Renegade Software	Unreleased	June 1994	1994	
International Superstar Soccer •Jikkyō World Soccer: Perfect Eleven^{JP}	Konami	Konami	November 11, 1994	June 1995	May 23, 1995	
International Superstar Soccer Deluxe •Jikkyō World Soccer 2: Fighting Eleven^{JP}	Konami	Konami	September 22, 1995	November 1995	January 25, 1996	
International Tennis Tour	Loriciel	Micro World (JP); Taito (NA); Loriciel (PAL)	March 26, 1993	November 1993	1993	
Ippatsu Gyakuten: Keiba Keirin Kyōtei	Electronics Application	Pow	April 26, 1996	Unreleased	Unreleased	
Iron Commando: Kōtetsu no Senshi •Iron Commando^{PAL}	Arcade Zone	Poppo	February 10, 1995	Unreleased	Cancelled	
Isozuri: Ritō Hen		Pack-In-Video	January 19, 1996	Unreleased	Unreleased	
Itadaki Street 2: Neon Sign wa Bara Iro ni	Tomcat System	Enix	February 26, 1994	Unreleased	Unreleased	
The Itchy & Scratchy Game	Bits Studios	Acclaim Entertainment	Unreleased	March 1995	1995	
Itoi Shigesato no Bass Tsuri No. 1	HAL Laboratory	Nintendo	February 21, 1997	Unreleased	Unreleased	
Itō Haka Rokudan no Shōgi Dōjō		ASK	February 4, 1994	Unreleased	Unreleased	
Izzy's Quest for the Olympic Rings	Alexandria	U.S. Gold	Unreleased	November 1995	1995	
J.League '96 Dream Stadium	A.I. Company Ltd.	Hudson Soft	June 1, 1996	Unreleased	Unreleased	
J.League Excite Stage '95	A-Max	Epoch Co.	April 28, 1995	Unreleased	Unreleased	
J.League Excite Stage '96	A-Max	Epoch Co.	April 26, 1996	Unreleased	Unreleased	
J.League Soccer Prime Goal	Namco	Namco	August 6, 1993	Unreleased	Unreleased	
J.League Soccer Prime Goal 2		Namco	August 5, 1994	Unreleased	Unreleased	
J.League Super Soccer '95 Jikkyō Stadium	A.I. Company Ltd.	Hudson Soft	March 17, 1995	Unreleased	Unreleased	
J.R.R. Tolkien's The Lord of the Rings, Vol. I	Interplay Entertainment	Interplay Entertainment	Unreleased	October 1994	May 23, 1995	
Jack Nicklaus Golf	Leland Interactive Media	Tradewest	Unreleased	May 1992	1992	
Jaki Crush	Compile	Naxat Soft	December 18, 1992	Unreleased	Unreleased	
Jaleco Rally: Big Run: The Supreme 4WD Challenge		Jaleco	March 20, 1991	Cancelled	Unreleased	
James Bond Jr.	Gray Matter	THQ	Unreleased	October 1992	1992	
James Pond 3: Operation Starfish	Vectordean	U.S. Gold	Unreleased	Unreleased	1993	
Jammes	Mighty Craft	Carrozzeria	February 10, 1995	Unreleased	Unreleased	
Jammit	GTE Interactive Media	GTE Interactive Media	Unreleased	November 1994	Unreleased	
Janyūki Gokū Randa		Virgin Interactive Entertainment	January 13, 1995	Unreleased	Unreleased	
JB The Super Bass	Gaps	Naxat Soft	December 15, 1995	Unreleased	Unreleased	
Jelly Boy	Probe Entertainment	Ocean Software	Unreleased	Cancelled	March 1995	
Jeopardy!	Imagineering	GameTek	Unreleased	December 1992	Unreleased	
Jeopardy! Deluxe Edition	Imagineering	GameTek	Unreleased	June 1994	Unreleased	
Jeopardy! Sports Edition	Imagineering	GameTek	Unreleased	May 1994	Unreleased	
The Jetsons: Invasion of the Planet Pirates •Yōkai Buster: Ruka no Daibōken^{JP}	Sting Entertainment	Kadokawa Shoten (JP); Taito (NA)	June 9, 1995	June 1994	Unreleased	
Jikkyō Keiba Simulation: Stable Star	KCEO	Konami	March 22, 1996	Unreleased	Unreleased	
Jikkyō Oshaberi Parodius	KCEO	Konami	December 15, 1995	Unreleased	Unreleased	
Jikkyō Power Pro Wrestling '96: Max Voltage	Diamond Head	Konami	September 13, 1996	Unreleased	Unreleased	
Jikkyō Powerful Pro Yakyū: Basic Han '98	Diamond Head	Konami	March 19, 1998	Unreleased	Unreleased	
Jikkyō Powerful Pro Yakyū '94 •Powerful Pro Baseball^{NA}	Diamond Head	Konami	March 11, 1994	Cancelled	Unreleased	
Jikkyō Powerful Pro Yakyū '96 Kaimaku Han	Diamond Head	Konami	July 19, 1996	Unreleased	Unreleased	
Jikkyō Powerful Pro Yakyū 2	Diamond Head	Konami	February 24, 1995	Unreleased	Unreleased	
Jikkyō Powerful Pro Yakyū 3	Diamond Head	Konami	February 29, 1996	Unreleased	Unreleased	
Jikkyō Powerful Pro Yakyū 3 '97 Haru	Diamond Head	Konami	March 20, 1997	Unreleased	Unreleased	
Jim Lee's WildC.A.T.S: Covert Action Teams	Beam Software	Playmates Interactive Entertainment	Unreleased	November 1995	Unreleased	
Jim Power: The Lost Dimension in 3-D	Loriciel	Electro Brain	Unreleased	December 1993	Unreleased	
Jimmy Connors Pro Tennis Tour	Blue Byte	Misawa (JP); Ubisoft (NA/PAL)	October 29, 1993	December 1992	October 27, 1994	
Jimmy Houston's Bass Tournament U.S.A. •Jissen! Bass Fishing Hisshōhō in USA^{JP}	Nexus Interact	Sammy Corporation (JP); American Sammy (NA)	August 25, 1995	November 1995	Unreleased	
Jirō Akagawa: Majotachi no Nemuri	Minato Giken	Pack-In-Video	November 24, 1995	Unreleased	Unreleased	
Jissen Kyōtei	Aisystem Tokyo	Imagineer	June 23, 1995	Unreleased	Unreleased	
Jissen Pachi-Slot Hisshōhō		Sammy Corporation	November 26, 1993	Unreleased	Unreleased	
Jissen Pachi-Slot Hisshōhō! 2		Sammy Corporation	September 16, 1994	Unreleased	Unreleased	
Jissen Pachi-Slot Hisshōhō! Classic		Sammy Corporation	July 7, 1995	Unreleased	Unreleased	
Jissen Pachi-Slot Hisshōhō! Twin		Sammy Corporation	March 15, 1997	Unreleased	Unreleased	
Jissen Pachi-Slot Hisshōhō! Twin Vol. 2	Tose	Sammy Corporation	September 12, 1997	Unreleased	Unreleased	
Jissen Pachi-Slot Hisshōhō! Yamasa Densetsu		Sammy Corporation	April 5, 1996	Unreleased	Unreleased	
Jissen Pachinko Hisshōhō! 2		Sammy Corporation	March 8, 1996	Unreleased	Unreleased	
Jissen! Mahjong Shinan	Syscom	ASK	January 13, 1995	Unreleased	Unreleased	
Joe & Mac •Joe & Mac: Caveman Ninja^{PAL} •Joe & Mac: Tatakae Genshijin^{JP}	Data East	Data East (JP/NA); Elite Systems (PAL)	December 6, 1991	January 1992	1992	
Joe & Mac 2: Lost in the Tropics •Joe & Mac 3: Lost in the Tropics^{PAL} •Tatakae Genshijin 3: Shuyaku wa Yappari Joe & Mac^{JP}	Data East	Data East (JP/NA); Elite Systems (PAL)	February 18, 1994	April 1994	November 1995	
John Madden Football •Pro Football^{JP}	Park Place Productions	Imagineer (JP); Electronic Arts (NA)	January 17, 1992	November 1991	Unreleased	
John Madden Football '93 •Pro Football '93^{JP}	EA Canada	Electronic Arts Victor (JP); Electronic Arts (NA/PAL)	February 12, 1993	November 1992	1992	
JoJo no Kimyō na Bōken	Winkysoft	Cobra Team	March 5, 1993	Unreleased	Unreleased	
Jōshō Mahjong Tenpai	Game Arts	Enix	September 29, 1995	Unreleased	Unreleased	
Judge Dredd	Probe Entertainment	Acclaim Entertainment	October 27, 1995	June 16, 1995	August 24, 1995	
Jumpin' Derby	KID	Naxat Soft	April 26, 1996	Unreleased	Unreleased	
The Jungle Book	Eurocom Entertainment Software	Virgin Interactive Entertainment	July 15, 1994	August 1994	September 24, 1994	
Jungle no Ōja Tar-chan: Sekai Man'yū Dai Kakutō no Maki	KID; Kūsōkagaku	Bandai	September 18, 1994	Unreleased	Unreleased	
Jungle Strike	Gremlin Interactive	Electronic Arts Victor (JP); Electronic Arts (NA/PAL)	September 22, 1995	June 1995	1995	
Jungle Wars 2: Kodai Mahō Atimos no Nazo	Atelier Double	Pony Canyon	March 19, 1993	Unreleased	Unreleased	
Jurassic Park	Ocean Software	Jaleco (JP); Ocean Software (NA/PAL)	June 24, 1994	November 1993	December 29, 1993	
Jurassic Park 2: The Chaos Continues	Ocean Software	Ocean Software	Unreleased	November 1994	1994	
Justice League Task Force	Blizzard Entertainment	Acclaim Entertainment	October 27, 1995	June 1995	July 1995	
Jutei Senki	Tam Tam	Enix	August 27, 1993	Unreleased	Unreleased	
JWP Joshi Pro Wrestling: Pure Wrestle Queens		Jaleco	December 23, 1994	Unreleased	Unreleased	
Ka-Blooey •Bombuzal^{JP}	Kemco	Kemco	December 1, 1990	August 1992	Unreleased	
Kabuki-chō Reach Mahjong: Tōpūsen	Studio Softmov	Pony Canyon	July 15, 1994	Unreleased	Unreleased	
Kabuki Rocks	Red Company	Atlus	March 4, 1994	Unreleased	Unreleased	
Kachō Kōsaku Shima: The Super Business Adventure	Tom Create	Yutaka	September 17, 1993	Unreleased	Unreleased	
Kakinoki Shōgi	ASCII Entertainment; SAS Sakata	ASCII Entertainment	September 1, 1995	Unreleased	Unreleased	
Kamaitachi no Yoru		Chunsoft	November 25, 1994	Unreleased	Unreleased	
Kamen Rider	Sun L	Bandai	November 12, 1993	Unreleased	Unreleased	
Kamen Rider SD: Shutsugeki!! Rider Machine		Yutaka	July 9, 1993	Unreleased	Unreleased	
Kat's Run: Zen-Nippon K Car Senshuken	Atlus	Atlus	July 14, 1995	Unreleased	Unreleased	
Katō Ichi-Ni-San Kudan Shōgi Club	Hect	Hect	May 16, 1997	Unreleased	Unreleased	
Kawa no Nushi Tsuri 2		Pack-In-Video	April 28, 1995	Unreleased	Unreleased	
Kawasaki Caribbean Challenge	Park Place Productions	GameTek	Unreleased	June 1993	Unreleased	
Kawasaki Superbike Challenge	Domark	Time Warner Interactive	Unreleased	December 1995	1995	
Keeper •CyberSlider^{NA}	Fupac	Datam Polystar	July 15, 1994	Cancelled	Unreleased	
Keiba Eight Special	C-Lab	Misawa	December 10, 1993	Unreleased	Unreleased	
Keiba Eight Special 2	C-Lab	Imagineer	September 30, 1994	Unreleased	Unreleased	
Kachiuma Yosō Soft: Baken Renkinjutsu		KSS	May 27, 1994	Unreleased	Unreleased	
Ken Griffey Jr. Presents Major League Baseball	Software Creations	Nintendo	Unreleased	March 1994	Unreleased	
Ken Griffey Jr.'s Winning Run	Rare	Nintendo	Unreleased	June 1996	Unreleased	
Kendo Rage •Makeruna! Makendō^{JP}	Affect	Datam Polystar (JP); SETA (NA)	January 22, 1993	October 1993	Unreleased	
Kenyū Densetsu Yaiba	Atelier Double	Banpresto	March 25, 1994	Unreleased	Unreleased	
Kero Kero Keroppi no Bōken Nikki: Nemureru Mori no Keroleen		Character Soft	March 25, 1994	Unreleased	Unreleased	
Kessen! Dokapon Okukoku IV: Densetsu no Yūsha Tachi		Asmik Ace Entertainment	December 10, 1993	Unreleased	Unreleased	
Kevin Keegan's Player Manager •K.H. Rummenigge's Player Manager^{GER}	Anco	Imagineer	Unreleased	Unreleased	1993	
Kick Off •Super Kick Off^{JP}	Anco	Imagineer	December 25, 1992	Unreleased	1993	
Kick Off 3: European Challenge	Anco	Vic Tokai	Unreleased	Cancelled	1994	
Kid Klown in Crazy Chase	Kemco	Kemco (JP/NA); Nintendo (PAL)	October 21, 1994	September 1994	1995	
Kidō Butōden G-Gundam	Pandora Box	Bandai	December 27, 1994	Unreleased	Unreleased	
Kidō Senshi Gundam: Cross Dimension 0079		Bandai	February 10, 1995	Unreleased	Unreleased	
Kidō Senshi Gundam F91: Formula Senki 0122	Nova Games	Bandai	July 6, 1991	Unreleased	Unreleased	
Kidō Senshi V Gundam	Tose	Bandai	March 11, 1994	Unreleased	Unreleased	
Kidō Senshi Z Gundam: Away to the NewType		Bandai	March 1, 1996	Unreleased	Unreleased	
Kidō Keisatsu Patlabor	Interbec	BEC	April 22, 1994	Unreleased	Unreleased	
Kikō Keisatsu Metal Jack	Atlus	Atlus	July 31, 1992	Cancelled	Unreleased	
Kikuni Masahiko no Jantōshi Dora Ō	C-Lab	Planning Office Wada	February 19, 1993	Unreleased	Unreleased	
Kikuni Masahiko no Jantōshi Dora Ō 2		Planning Office Wada	December 3, 1993	Unreleased	Unreleased	
Killer Instinct	Rare	Nintendo	Unreleased	August 30, 1995	September 21, 1995	
Kindai Mahjong Special	Outback	Imagineer	March 31, 1995	Unreleased	Unreleased	
King Arthur & the Knights of Justice	Manley & Associates	Enix	Unreleased	July 1995	Unreleased	
King Arthur's World •Royal Conquest^{JP}	Argonaut Software	Jaleco	November 27, 1992	September 1994	1993	
The King of Dragons	Capcom	Capcom	March 4, 1994	April 1994	August 1994	
King of the Monsters	Genki	Takara	July 31, 1992	October 1992	1992	
King of the Monsters 2	Now Production; Winds	Takara	December 22, 1993	June 1994	Unreleased	
The King of Rally	KAZe	Meldac	December 18, 1992	Cancelled	Unreleased	
Kingyo Chūihō! Tobidase Game Gakuen		Jaleco	March 18, 1994	Unreleased	Unreleased	
Kinnikuman: Dirty Challenger		Yutaka	August 21, 1992	Unreleased	Unreleased	
Kirby no Kirakira Kizzu	HAL Laboratory	Nintendo	June 25, 1999	Unreleased	Unreleased	
Kirby Super Star •Kirby's Fun Pak^{PAL} •Hoshi no Kirby Super Deluxe^{JP}	HAL Laboratory	Nintendo	March 21, 1996	September 20, 1996	January 23, 1997	
Kirby's Avalanche •Kirby's Ghost Trap^{PAL} •Super Puyo Puyo^{JP}	HAL Laboratory (Kirby's Avalanche/Kirby's Ghost Trap only); Compile	Banpresto (JP); Nintendo (NA/PAL)	December 10, 1993	April 1995	February 1, 1995	
Kirby's Dream Course •Kirby Bowl^{JP}	HAL Laboratory; Nintendo EAD	Nintendo	September 21, 1994	February 1995	August 24, 1995	
Kirby's Dream Land 3 •Hoshi no Kirby 3^{JP}	HAL Laboratory	Nintendo	March 27, 1998	November 17, 1997	Unreleased	
Kishin Dōji Zenki: Batoru Raiden	CAProduction	Hudson Soft	August 4, 1995	Unreleased	Unreleased	
Kishin Dōji Zenki: Denei Raibu	Now Production	Hudson Soft	November 24, 1995	Unreleased	Unreleased	
Kishin Dōji Zenki: Tenchi Meidō		Hudson Soft	February 23, 1996	Unreleased	Unreleased	
Kishin Korinden Oni	Pandora Box	Banpresto	August 5, 1994	Unreleased	Unreleased	
Kiteretsu Daihyakka: Chōjikū Sugoroku	Video System	Video System	January 27, 1995	Unreleased	Unreleased	
Knights of the Round	Capcom	Capcom	June 10, 1994	April 1994	Unreleased	
Konpeki no Kantai	Access	Angel	November 2, 1995	Unreleased	Unreleased	
Kōryaku Casino Bar	Nichibutsu	Nichibutsu	July 14, 1995	Unreleased	Unreleased	
Kōryū Densetsu Villgust	Winkysoft	Bandai	May 23, 1992	Unreleased	Unreleased	
Kōryū no Mimi	VAP	VAP	December 22, 1995	Unreleased	Unreleased	
Kōshien 2	Affect	K Amusement Leasing	June 19, 1992	Unreleased	Unreleased	
Kōshien 3	Magical Company	Magical Company	July 29, 1994	Unreleased	Unreleased	
Kōshien 4	Magical Company	Magical Company	July 14, 1995	Unreleased	Unreleased	
Kōsoku Shikō: Shōgi Ō	Access	Imagineer	March 24, 1995	Unreleased	Unreleased	
Kōtetsu no Kishi	Dual	Asmik Ace Entertainment	February 19, 1993	Unreleased	Unreleased	
Kōtetsu no Kishi 2: Sabaku no Rommel Shōgun	Dual	Asmik Ace Entertainment	January 28, 1994	Unreleased	Unreleased	
Kōtetsu no Kishi 3: Gekitotsu Europe Sensen	Dual	Asmik Ace Entertainment	January 27, 1995	Unreleased	Unreleased	
Krusty's Super Fun House •Krusty World^{JP}	Audiogenic	Acclaim Entertainment	January 29, 1993	June 1992	1992	
Kunio no Oden		Technōs Japan	May 27, 1994	Unreleased	Unreleased	
Kunio-kun no Dodgeball da yo Zen'in Shūgō!!	Technōs Japan	Technōs Japan	August 6, 1993	Unreleased	Unreleased	
Kūsō Kagaku Sekai Gulliver Boy	Amble	Bandai	June 27, 1996	Unreleased	Unreleased	
Kyle Petty's No Fear Racing •Circuit USA^{JP}	Leland Interactive Media	Virgin Interactive Entertainment (JP); Williams Entertainment (NA)	June 30, 1995	April 1995	Unreleased	
Kyōraku Sanyō Maruhon Parlor! Parlor!		Telenet Japan	March 30, 1995	Unreleased	Unreleased	
Kyōraku Sanyō Maruhon Parlor! Parlor! 2		Telenet Japan	August 25, 1995	Unreleased	Unreleased	
Kyōraku Sanyō Maruhon Parlor! Parlor! 3		Telenet Japan	January 19, 1996	Unreleased	Unreleased	
Kyōraku Sanyō Maruhon Parlor! Parlor! IV CR		Telenet Japan	December 29, 1995	Unreleased	Unreleased	
Kyōraku Sanyō Maruhon Parlor! Parlor! 5		Telenet Japan	March 29, 1996	Unreleased	Unreleased	
Kyūyaku Megami Tensei	Opera House	Atlus	March 31, 1995	Unreleased	Unreleased	
Lady Stalker: Challenge from the Past	Climax Entertainment	Taito	April 1, 1995	Unreleased	Unreleased	
Lagoon	Kemco	Kemco (JP/PAL); Seika Corporation (NA)	December 13, 1991	December 1991	May 27, 1993	
Lamborghini American Challenge	Titus Software	Titus Software	Unreleased	November 1993	1993	
Laplace no Ma		Vic Tokai	July 14, 1995	Unreleased	Unreleased	
Last Action Hero	Bits Studios	Sony Imagesoft	Unreleased	October 1993	December 10, 1993	
The Last Battle	Atelier Double	Techiku	December 2, 1994	Unreleased	Unreleased	
Last Bible III	Multimedia Intelligence Transfer	Atlus	March 4, 1995	Unreleased	Unreleased	
The Lawnmower Man •Virtual Wars^{JP}	Sales Curve Interactive	Coconuts Japan (JP); THQ (NA); Storm (PAL)	February 11, 1994	November 1993	1993	
Leading Company	Koei	Koei	February 26, 1993	Unreleased	Unreleased	
Leading Jockey		Carrozzeria	September 16, 1994	Unreleased	Unreleased	
Leading Jockey 2		Carrozzeria	November 24, 1995	Unreleased	Unreleased	
Legend	Arcade Zone	Seika Corporation (NA); Sony Imagesoft (PAL)	Unreleased	April 1994	December 21, 1994	
The Legend of the Mystical Ninja •Ganbare Goemon: Yukihime Kyūshutsu Emaki^{JP}	Konami	Konami	July 19, 1991	February 1992	1994	
The Legend of Zelda: A Link to the Past •Zelda no Densetsu: Kamigami no Triforce^{JP}	Nintendo EAD	Nintendo	November 21, 1991	April 13, 1992	September 24, 1992	
Lemmings	Sunsoft; Chat Noir	Sunsoft	December 18, 1991	March 1992	August 1992	
Lemmings 2: The Tribes	DMA Design	Sunsoft (JP); Psygnosis (NA/PAL)	August 12, 1994	November 1994	1994	
Lennus II: Fūin no Shito	Copya Systems	Asmik Ace Entertainment	July 26, 1996	Unreleased	Unreleased	
Lester the Unlikely •Odekake Lester: Lelele no Le (^^;^{JP}	Visual Concepts	Asmik Ace Entertainment (JP); DTMC (NA)	September 16, 1994	January 1994	Unreleased	
Lethal Enforcers	Konami	Konami	March 11, 1994	January 1994	1994	
Lethal Weapon	Ocean Software	Ocean Software	Unreleased	December 1992	1992	
Liberty or Death •Dokuritsu Sensō: Liberty or Death^{JP}	Koei	Koei	March 18, 1994	April 1994	Unreleased	
Libble Rabble	Namco	Namco	September 22, 1994	Unreleased	Unreleased	
Light Fantasy	Advance Communication Company	Tonkin House	July 3, 1992	Unreleased	Unreleased	
Light Fantasy II		Tonkin House	October 27, 1995	Unreleased	Unreleased	
The Lion King	Westwood Studios	Virgin Interactive Entertainment	December 9, 1994	November 9, 1994	November 11, 1994	
Little Magic		Altron	December 24, 1993	Unreleased	Cancelled	
Little Master: Nijiiro no Maseki	Tokuma Shoten	Tokuma Shoten	June 30, 1995	Unreleased	Unreleased	
Live A Live	Square	Square	September 2, 1994	Unreleased	Unreleased	
Lock On •Super Air Diver^{PAL, JP}	Copya Systems	Asmik Ace Entertainment (JP); Vic Tokai (NA); Sunsoft (PAL)	July 16, 1993	October 1993	1993	
Lode Runner Twin: Justy to Liberty no Daibōken		T&E Soft	July 29, 1994	Unreleased	Unreleased	
Lodoss Tō Senki: Record of Lodoss War	Thinking Rabbit	Kadokawa Shoten	December 22, 1995	Unreleased	Unreleased	
Logos Panic	Kan's	Yutaka	November 17, 1995	Unreleased	Unreleased	
Looney Tunes B-Ball •Looney Tunes Basketball^{PAL}	Sculptured Software	Sunsoft	Unreleased	February 1995	May 1995	
Lord Monarch	AIM	Epoch Co.	October 9, 1992	Unreleased	Unreleased	
The Lost Vikings •Viking no Daimeiwaku^{JP}	Silicon & Synapse	T&E Soft (JP); Interplay Entertainment (NA/PAL)	October 8, 1993	April 1993	October 28, 1993	
The Lost Vikings 2	Blizzard Entertainment	Interplay Entertainment	Unreleased	May 1997	February 27, 1997	
Love Quest	C-Lab	Tokuma Shoten	March 17, 1995	Unreleased	Unreleased	
Lucky Luke	Infogrames	Infogrames	Unreleased	Unreleased	October 27, 1997	
Lufia & the Fortress of Doom •Estpolis Denki^{JP}	Neverland	Taito	June 25, 1993	December 1993	Unreleased	
Lufia II: Rise of the Sinistrals •Lufia^{PAL} •Estpolis Denki II^{JP}	Neverland	Taito (JP); Natsume Inc. (NA); Nintendo (PAL)	February 24, 1995	August 1996	1997	
Lupin III: Densetsu no Hihō o Oe!	Pop House; SAS Sakata	Epoch Co.	December 27, 1994	Unreleased	Unreleased	
Madden NFL '94 •NFL Pro Football '94^{JP}	Visual Concepts	Electronic Arts Victor (JP); EA Sports (NA/PAL)	December 24, 1993	November 1993	1994	
Madden NFL '95	Visual Concepts	EA Sports	Unreleased	November 1994	1994	
Madden NFL '96	Tiburon Entertainment	EA Sports	Unreleased	November 1995	Unreleased	
Madden NFL 97	Tiburon Entertainment	EA Sports	Unreleased	October 1996	Unreleased	
Madden NFL 98	Electronic Arts	EA Sports	Unreleased	December 2, 1997	Unreleased	
Madō Monogatari: Hanamaru Daiyōchienji	Compile	Compile	January 12, 1996	Unreleased	Unreleased	
Magic Boy	Blue Turtle	JVC Musical Industries	Unreleased	August 1996	1996	
Magic Knight Rayearth	Pandora Box	Tomy	September 29, 1995	Unreleased	Unreleased	
Magic Sword	Minakuchi Engineering	Capcom	May 29, 1992	August 1992	March 18, 1993	
Magical Drop	Data East	Data East	October 20, 1995	Unreleased	Unreleased	
Magical Drop 2	Data East	Data East	September 20, 1996	Cancelled	Unreleased	
The Magical Quest Starring Mickey Mouse •Mickey no Magical Adventure^{JP}	Capcom	Capcom	November 20, 1992	December 1992	March 18, 1993	
Magical Pop'n	Polestar	Pack-in-Video	March 10, 1995	Unreleased	Unreleased	
Magical Taruruto-kun: Magic Adventure	Tose	Bandai	March 28, 1992	Unreleased	Unreleased	
Magna Braban: Henreki no Yūsha	Lenar	ASK	November 18, 1994	Unreleased	Unreleased	
Mahjong Club	Natsu System	Hect	December 22, 1994	Unreleased	Unreleased	
Mahjong Gokū Tenjiku	Chat Noir	Chat Noir	August 19, 1994	Unreleased	Unreleased	
Mahjong Hanjōki		Nichibutsu	July 28, 1995	Unreleased	Unreleased	
Mahjong Hishō-den: Naki no Ryū		IGS	December 25, 1992	Unreleased	Unreleased	
Mahjong Sengoku Monogatari	Khaos	Yojigen	September 23, 1994	Unreleased	Unreleased	
Mahjong Taikai II		Koei	September 30, 1994	Unreleased	Unreleased	
The Mahjong Tōhaiden	Khaos	Video System	April 16, 1993	Unreleased	Unreleased	
Mahō Poi Poi Poitto!	Metro	Takara	August 5, 1994	Unreleased	Unreleased	
Mahōjin Guru Guru	Tam Tam	Enix	April 21, 1995	Unreleased	Unreleased	
Mahōjin Guru Guru 2	Tam Tam	Enix	April 12, 1996	Unreleased	Unreleased	
Majin Tensei	Atlus	Atlus	January 28, 1994	Unreleased	Unreleased	
Majin Tensei II: Spiral Nemesis	Atlus	Atlus	February 19, 1995	Unreleased	Unreleased	
Major Title •The Irem Skins Game^{NA}	Irem	Irem	December 4, 1992	October 1992	1993	
Majūō	Prism Kikaku Ltd.	KSS	August 25, 1995	Unreleased	Unreleased	
Maka Maka	Office Kōkan	Sigma Enterprises	April 24, 1992	Unreleased	Unreleased	
Makeruna! Makendō 2: Kimero Yōkai Sōri	Success	Datam Polystar	March 17, 1995	Unreleased	Unreleased	
Manchester United Championship Soccer •Lothar Matthäus Super Soccer^{GER}	Krisalis Software	Ocean Software	Unreleased	Unreleased	1995	
Marchen Adventure Cotton 100%	Success	Datam Polystar	April 22, 1994	Unreleased	Unreleased	
Mario & Wario	Game Freak	Nintendo	August 27, 1993	Cancelled	Unreleased	
Mario is Missing!	The Software Toolworks	The Software Toolworks (NA); Mindscape (PAL)	Unreleased	June 1993	September 1993	
Mario no Super Picross	Ape; Jupiter	Nintendo	September 14, 1995	Unreleased	Unreleased	
Mario Paint	Nintendo R&D1; Intelligent Systems	Nintendo	July 14, 1992	August 17, 1992	December 10, 1992	
Mario's Early Years! Fun with Letters	The Software Toolworks	The Software Toolworks	Unreleased	September 1994	Unreleased	
Mario's Early Years! Fun with Numbers	The Software Toolworks	The Software Toolworks	Unreleased	October 1994	Unreleased	
Mario's Early Years! Preschool Fun	The Software Toolworks	Mindscape	Unreleased	November 1994	Unreleased	
Mario's Time Machine	The Software Toolworks	The Software Toolworks (NA); Mindscape (PAL)	Unreleased	December 1993	1993	
Mark Davis' The Fishing Master •Oomono Black Bass Fishing: Jinzōko Hen^{JP}	Natsume Co., Ltd.	Natsume Inc.	June 30, 1995	April 1996	Unreleased	
Marko's Magic Football	Domark	Acclaim Entertainment	Unreleased	Unreleased	1995	
Marmalade Boy	KID; Kūsōkagaku	Bandai	April 21, 1995	Unreleased	Unreleased	
Marvel Super Heroes: War of the Gems	Capcom	Capcom	October 18, 1996	November 1996	1996	
Marvelous: Mōhitotsu no Takarajima	Nintendo R&D2	Nintendo	October 26, 1996	Unreleased	Unreleased	
Mary Shelley's Frankenstein	Bits Studios	Sony Imagesoft	Unreleased	November 1994	Unreleased	
The Mask	Black Pearl Software	Virgin Interactive Entertainment (JP); Black Pearl Software (NA/PAL)	December 27, 1996	October 1995	October 26, 1995	
Maten Densetsu: Senritsu no Ooparts	Thinking Rabbit	Takara	October 27, 1995	Unreleased	Unreleased	
Math Blaster: Episode 1	Western Technologies	Davidson & Associates	Unreleased	October 1994	Unreleased	
Matsukata Hiroki no Super Trawling	Atelier Double	Tonkin House	August 25, 1995	Unreleased	Unreleased	
Matsumura Kunihiro Den: Saikyō no Rekishi o Nurikaero!	Office Kōkan	Shōei	August 26, 1994	Unreleased	Unreleased	
Maui Mallard in Cold Shadow •Donald in Maui Mallard^{PAL, JP}	Eurocom Entertainment Software	Capcom (JP); Nintendo (NA/PAL)	December 20, 1996	January 1997	November 28, 1996	
Mazinger Z	Winkysoft	Bandai	June 25, 1993	Unreleased	Unreleased	
Mecarobot Golf •Serizawa Nobuo no Birdie Try^{JP}	Advance Communication Company	Toho	December 4, 1992	September 1993	Unreleased	
MechWarrior •BattleTech^{JP}	Beam Software	Victor Interactive Software (JP); Activision (NA/PAL)	February 26, 1993	May 1993	1993	
MechWarrior 3050 •BattleTech 3050^{JP}	Tiburon Entertainment	ASK (JP); Activision (NA/PAL)	February 23, 1996	October 1995	1995	
Mega-Lo-Mania •Mega Lo Mania: Jikū Daisenryaku^{JP}	Sensible Software	Imagineer	July 23, 1993	Unreleased	December 31, 1994	
Mega Man 7 •Rockman 7: Shukumei no Taiketsu!^{JP}	Capcom	Capcom (JP/NA); Laguna GmbH (PAL)	March 24, 1995	September 1995	November 20, 1995	
Mega Man Soccer •Rockman's Soccer^{JP}	Sun L	Capcom	March 25, 1994	April 1994	Unreleased	
Mega Man X •Rockman X^{JP}	Capcom	Capcom (JP/NA); Nintendo (PAL)	December 17, 1993	January 1994	May 1, 1994	
Mega Man X2 •Rockman X2^{JP}	Capcom	Capcom (JP/NA); Laguna GmbH (PAL)	December 16, 1994	January 1995	November 18, 1995	
Mega Man X3 •Rockman X3^{JP}	Minakuchi Engineering	Capcom (JP/NA); Laguna GmbH (PAL)	December 1, 1995	January 1996	May 15, 1996	
Mega Man & Bass •Rockman & Forte^{JP}	Capcom	Capcom	April 24, 1998	Unreleased	Unreleased	
Melfand Stories	Sting Entertainment	ASCII Entertainment	March 25, 1994	Unreleased	Unreleased	
Metal Combat: Falcon's Revenge	Intelligent Systems	Nintendo	Unreleased	December 1993	1994	
Metal Marines •Militia^{JP}	Namco	Namco (JP/NA); Mindscape (PAL)	November 18, 1994	December 1993	1994	
Metal Max 2	Crea-Tech; Data East	Data East	March 5, 1993	Unreleased	Unreleased	
Metal Max Returns	Crea-Tech; Data East	Data East	September 29, 1995	Unreleased	Unreleased	
Metal Morph	Origin Systems	FCI	Unreleased	December 1994	Unreleased	
Metal Slader Glory: Director's Cut	HAL Laboratory	Nintendo	November 29, 2000	Unreleased	Unreleased	
Metal Warriors	LucasArts	Konami	Unreleased	April 1995	Unreleased	
Michael Andretti's Indy Car Challenge	Genki	Bullet-Proof Software	January 20, 1995	September 1994	Unreleased	
Michael Jordan: Chaos in the Windy City	Electronic Arts	Electronic Arts	Unreleased	November 1994	March 11, 1995	
Mickey Mania: The Timeless Adventures of Mickey Mouse	Traveller's Tales	Capcom (JP); Sony Imagesoft (NA/PAL)	March 31, 1995	November 1, 1994	October 28, 1994	
Mickey no Tokyo Disneyland Daibōken	Graphic Research	Tomy	December 16, 1994	Unreleased	Unreleased	
Mickey to Donald: Magical Adventure 3	Sun L	Capcom	December 8, 1995	Unreleased	Unreleased	
Mickey's Ultimate Challenge	Designer Software	Hi Tech Expressions	Unreleased	February 1994	Unreleased	
Micro Machines	Codemasters	Ocean Software	Unreleased	December 1994	1994	
Micro Machines 2: Turbo Tournament	Codemasters	Ocean Software	Unreleased	Unreleased	February 22, 1996	
Might and Magic: Book II	Starcraft Inc.	LOZC G. Amusements	January 22, 1993	Unreleased	Unreleased	
Might and Magic II •Might & Magic II: Gates to Another World^{NA}	Iguana Entertainment	Elite Systems	Unreleased	Cancelled	1993	
Might and Magic III: Isles of Terra	Iguana Entertainment	FCI	Unreleased	January 1995	Unreleased	
Mighty Morphin Power Rangers	Natsume Co., Ltd.	Bandai	November 25, 1995	September 1994	November 1994	
Mighty Morphin Power Rangers: The Fighting Edition	Natsume Co., Ltd.	Bandai	Unreleased	September 1995	November 1995	
Mighty Morphin Power Rangers: The Movie	Natsume Co., Ltd.	Bandai	Unreleased	July 1995	1995	
Milandra	Tomcat System	ASCII Entertainment	January 31, 1997	Unreleased	Unreleased	
Mini Yonku Let's & Go!!: Power WGP 2	Jupiter	Nintendo	December 4, 1998	Unreleased	Unreleased	
Mini Yonku Shining Scorpion: Let's & Go!!	KID	ASCII Entertainment	December 20, 1996	Unreleased	Unreleased	
Miracle Casino Paradise		Carrozzeria	January 27, 1995	Unreleased	Unreleased	
Miracle Girls	Now Production	Takara	October 22, 1993	Unreleased	Unreleased	
Miracle Piano	The Software Toolworks	The Software Toolworks	Unreleased	December 1991	Unreleased	
Miyaji Shachō no Pachinko Fan: Shōri Sengen 2		Planning Office Wada	April 21, 1995	Unreleased	Unreleased	
Mizuki Shigeru no Yōkai Hyakkiyakō		KSS	December 20, 1995	Unreleased	Unreleased	
MLBPA Baseball •Fighting Baseball^{JP}	Visual Concepts	Coconuts Japan (JP); EA Sports (NA)	August 11, 1995	March 1994	Unreleased	
Mohawk & Headphone Jack	Solid Software	Black Pearl Software (NA); THQ (PAL)	Unreleased	August 1996	March 27, 1997	
Momotarō Dentetsu Happy	Make	Hudson Soft	December 6, 1996	Unreleased	Unreleased	
Monopoly	Sculptured Software	Parker Brothers	Unreleased	September 1992	Unreleased	
Monopoly (Japanese game)	Ape; CreamSoft	Tomy	March 5, 1993	Unreleased	Unreleased	
The Monopoly Game 2	Ape; Tomcat System	Tomy	March 31, 1995	Unreleased	Unreleased	
Monstania	Bits Laboratory	Pack-In-Video	September 27, 1996	Unreleased	Unreleased	
Monster Maker III: Hikari no Majutsushi		SOFEL	December 24, 1993	Unreleased	Unreleased	
Monster Maker Kids: Ōsama ni Naritai		SOFEL	November 18, 1994	Unreleased	Unreleased	
Mortal Kombat •Mortal Kombat: Kami Ken Kōrin Densetsu^{JP}	Sculptured Software	Acclaim Entertainment	December 17, 1993	September 13, 1993	September 13, 1993	
Mortal Kombat II •Kyūkyoku Kami Ken Mortal Kombat II^{JP}	Sculptured Software	Acclaim Entertainment	November 11, 1994	September 9, 1994	September 9, 1994	
Mortal Kombat 3	Sculptured Software	Williams Entertainment (NA); Acclaim Entertainment (PAL)	Unreleased	October 13, 1995	October 20, 1995	
Mōryō Senki MADARA 2	Konami	Konami	July 16, 1993	Unreleased	Unreleased	
Motteke Oh! Dorobō		Data East	December 15, 1995	Unreleased	Unreleased	
Mountain Bike Rally	Radical Entertainment	Life Fitness Entertainment (Oct. 1994)	Unreleased	October 1994	Unreleased	
Mr. Do!	C-Lab	Imagineer (JP); Black Pearl Software (NA/PAL)	June 23, 1995	December 1996	March 27, 1997	
Mr. Nutz	Ocean Software	Ocean Software	October 7, 1994	August 1994	1993	
Ms. Pac-Man	Digital Eclipse Software	Williams Entertainment (NA); THQ (PAL)	Unreleased	November 11, 1996	March 1997	
Mujintō Monogatari	Open Sesame	KSS	January 26, 1996	Unreleased	Unreleased	
Multi Play Volleyball	Mebio Software	Pack-In-Video	October 28, 1994	Unreleased	Unreleased	
Musya •Gōsō Jinrai Densetsu Musya^{JP}	Jorudan	Datam Polystar (JP); SETA (NA)	April 24, 1992	December 1992	Unreleased	
Mystery Circle	Sammy Corporation	K Amusement Leasing	December 4, 1992	Unreleased	Unreleased	
Mystic Ark •7th Saga II^{NA}	Produce	Enix	July 14, 1995	Cancelled	Unreleased	
Nage Libre: Seijaku no Suishin		Varie	February 24, 1995	Unreleased	Unreleased	
Nakajima Satoru F-1 Hero '94		Varie	September 22, 1994	Unreleased	Unreleased	
Nakano Kōichi Kanshū: Keirin-Ō	C-Lab	Coconuts Japan	November 18, 1994	Unreleased	Unreleased	
Namco Open	Tose	Namco	January 29, 1993	Unreleased	Unreleased	
Nangoku Shōnen Papuwa-kun	Daft	Enix	March 25, 1994	Unreleased	Unreleased	
Naruhodo! The World		Tomy	November 25, 1994	Unreleased	Unreleased	
Natsuki Crisis Battle	Tose	Angel	April 21, 1995	Unreleased	Unreleased	
Natsume Championship Wrestling •Zen-Nippon Pro Wrestling Dash: Sekai Saikyō Tag^{JP}	Natsume Co., Ltd.	Masaya (JP); Natsume Co., Ltd. (NA)	December 28, 1993	June 1994	Unreleased	
NBA All-Star Challenge	Beam Software	Acclaim Entertainment (JP); LJN (NA/PAL)	May 21, 1993	December 1992	1993	
NBA Give 'n Go •NBA Jikkyō Basket: Winning Dunk^{JP}	Konami	Konami	September 29, 1995	November 1995	1995	
NBA Hangtime	Funcom	Midway Games (NA); THQ (PAL)	Unreleased	November 5, 1996	1996	
NBA Jam	Iguana Entertainment	Acclaim Entertainment	April 29, 1994	March 4, 1994	March 4, 1994	
NBA Jam Tournament Edition	Iguana Entertainment	Acclaim Entertainment	February 24, 1995	February 23, 1995	February 23, 1995	
NBA Live 95	Electronic Arts	Electronic Arts Victor (JP); EA Sports (NA/PAL)	December 16, 1994	October 1994	1994	
NBA Live 96	Electronic Arts	EA Sports	Unreleased	October 1995	November 23, 1995	
NBA Live 97	Electronic Arts	EA Sports	Unreleased	December 1996	1996	
NBA Live 98	EA Sports; Tiertex Design Studios	EA Sports	Unreleased	November 1997	Unreleased	
NBA Showdown •NBA Pro Basketball '94: Bulls vs Suns^{JP}	Electronic Arts	Electronic Arts Victor (JP); EA Sports (NA)	December 3, 1993	October 1993	Unreleased	
NCAA Basketball •World League Basketball^{PAL} •Super Dunk Shot^{JP}	Sculptured Software	HAL Laboratory (JP); Nintendo (NA/PAL)	June 19, 1992	October 1992	July 22, 1993	
NCAA Final Four Basketball	Bitmasters	Mindscape	Unreleased	February 1995	Unreleased	
NCAA Football	The Software Toolworks	Mindscape	Unreleased	October 1994	Unreleased	
Nekketsu Tairiku Burning Heroes	J-Force	Enix	March 17, 1995	Unreleased	Unreleased	
Neugier: Umi to Kaze no Kodō •The Journey Home: Quest for the Throne^{NA}	Wolf Team	Telenet Japan	March 26, 1993	Cancelled	Unreleased	
New Yatterman: Nandai Kandai Yajirobee	Tom Create	Yutaka	March 22, 1996	Unreleased	Unreleased	
Newman/Haas IndyCar featuring Nigel Mansell •Nigel Mansell Indy Car^{JP}	Gremlin Interactive	Acclaim Entertainment (JP/NA); Konami (PAL)	December 16, 1994	November 1994	December 8, 1994	
NFL Football	Park Place Productions	Konami	September 17, 1993	July 1993	1993	
NFL Quarterback Club	Iguana Entertainment	Acclaim Entertainment (JP); LJN (NA/PAL)	February 24, 1995	December 1994	April 1995	
NFL Quarterback Club 96	Iguana Entertainment	Acclaim Entertainment	March 1, 1996	October 27, 1995	1995	
NHL '94 •NHL Hockey '94^{PAL} •NHL Pro Hockey '94^{JP}	Electronic Arts	Electronic Arts Victor (JP); EA Sports (NA/PAL)	April 8, 1994	October 1993	March 31, 1994	
NHL 95	Visual Concepts; High Score Productions	EA Sports	Unreleased	November 1994	December 8, 1994	
NHL 96	High Score Productions; Tiburon Entertainment	EA Sports	Unreleased	September 1995	October 26, 1995	
NHL 97	Ceris Software	Black Pearl Software	Unreleased	October 15, 1996	November 28, 1996	
NHL 98	THQ	EA Sports	Unreleased	October 1997	Unreleased	
NHL Stanley Cup •Super Hockey^{PAL}	Sculptured Software	Nintendo	Unreleased	November 1993	1993	
NHLPA Hockey '93	Electronic Arts	Electronic Arts	Unreleased	December 1992	April 5, 1993	
Nice de Shot	Magical Company	ASK	April 29, 1994	Unreleased	Unreleased	
Nichibutsu Arcade Classics	Syscom	Nichibutsu	May 26, 1995	Unreleased	Unreleased	
Nichibutsu Arcade Classics 2: Heiankyo Alien	Syscom	Nichibutsu	December 15, 1995	Unreleased	Unreleased	
Nichibutsu Collection 1		Nichibutsu	November 29, 1996	Unreleased	Unreleased	
Nichibutsu Collection 2		Nichibutsu	December 27, 1996	Unreleased	Unreleased	
Nickelodeon Guts	Viacom New Media	Viacom New Media	Unreleased	November 1994	Unreleased	
Nigel Mansell's World Championship Racing •Nigel Mansell's World Championship^{PAL} •Nigel Mansell's F-1 Challenge^{JP}	Gremlin Interactive	Infocom (JP); GameTek (NA); Nintendo (PAL)	March 19, 1993	July 1993	December 16, 1993	
Ninja Gaiden Trilogy •Ninja Ryūkenden Tomoe^{JP}	Tecmo	Tecmo	August 11, 1995	August 1995	Unreleased	
Ninja Warriors •Ninja Warriors: The New Generation^{PAL} •The Ninja Warriors Again^{JP}	Natsume Co., Ltd.	Taito (JP/NA); Titus Software (PAL)	January 28, 1994	February 1994	April 1995	
Nintama Rantarō		Culture Brain	July 28, 1995	Unreleased	Unreleased	
Nintama Rantarō: Ninjutsu Gakuen Puzzle Taikai no Dan		Culture Brain	June 28, 1996	Unreleased	Unreleased	
Nintama Rantarō 2		Culture Brain	March 29, 1996	Unreleased	Unreleased	
Nintama Rantarō 3		Culture Brain	February 28, 1997	Unreleased	Unreleased	
Nintama Rantarō Special		Culture Brain	August 9, 1996	Unreleased	Unreleased	
Nishijin Pachinko Monogatari		KSS	June 23, 1995	Unreleased	Unreleased	
Nishijin Pachinko Monogatari 2	Soft Machine	KSS	June 28, 1996	Unreleased	Unreleased	
Nishijin Pachinko Monogatari 3	Soft Machine	KSS	December 20, 1996	Unreleased	Unreleased	
No Escape	Bits Studios	Sony Imagesoft	Unreleased	November 1994	Unreleased	
Nobunaga Kōki		Yanoman	January 29, 1993	Unreleased	Unreleased	
Nobunaga no Yabō: Haōden		Koei	December 9, 1993	Unreleased	Unreleased	
Nobunaga no Yabō: Tenshōki		Koei	January 26, 1996	Unreleased	Unreleased	
Nobunaga's Ambition •Nobunaga no Yabō: Zenkokuban^{JP}	Koei	Koei	August 5, 1993	December 1993	Unreleased	
Nobunaga's Ambition: Lord of Darkness •Super Nobunaga no Yabō: Bushō Fūunroku^{JP}	Koei	Koei	December 21, 1991	October 1994	Unreleased	
Nomark Baku Haitō: Shijō Saikyō no Jakushi Tatsu		Angel	September 29, 1995	Unreleased	Unreleased	
Nolan Ryan's Baseball •Super Stadium^{JP}	Romstar	Romstar	July 2, 1991	February 28, 1992	Unreleased	
Nontan to Issho: KuruKuru Puzzle	Game Freak	Victor Interactive Software	November 25, 1994	Unreleased	Unreleased	
Nosferatu	SETA	SETA	October 7, 1994	October 1995	Unreleased	
Numbers Paradise	ISCO	Acclaim Entertainment	August 30, 1996	Unreleased	Unreleased	
Obitus	Psygnosis	Bullet-Proof Software	Unreleased	September 1994	Unreleased	
O-Chan no Oekaki Logic	Game Studio	Sunsoft	December 1, 1995	Unreleased	Unreleased	
Oda Nobunaga: Haō no Gundan	Tose	Angel	February 26, 1993	Unreleased	Unreleased	
Oekaki Logic		Sekaibunka Publishing	June 1, 1999	Unreleased	Unreleased	
Oekaki Logic 2		Sekaibunka Publishing	November 1, 1999	Unreleased	Unreleased	
Ogre Battle: The March of the Black Queen •Densetsu no Ogre Battle^{JP}	Quest Corporation	Quest Corporation (JP); Enix (NA)	March 12, 1993	May 1995	Unreleased	
Olympic Summer Games	Black Pearl Software; Tiertex Design Studios	U.S. Gold	Unreleased	June 1996	June 27, 1996	
Okamoto Ayako to Match Play Golf	C.P. Brain	Tsukuda Original	December 21, 1994	Unreleased	Unreleased	
Olivia's Mystery		Altron	February 10, 1994	Unreleased	Unreleased	
On the Ball •Cameltry^{JP}	Taito	Taito	June 26, 1992	November 1992	1992	
Ongaku Tsukūru: Kanadeeru	Success	ASCII Entertainment	April 12, 1996	Unreleased	Unreleased	
Onita Atsushi FMW	Marionette	Pony Canyon	August 6, 1993	Unreleased	Unreleased	
Onizuka Katsuya Super Virtual Boxing	Sting Entertainment	SOFEL	November 26, 1993	Unreleased	Unreleased	
Oozumō Shusse Simulation: Yokozuna Monogatari		KSS	August 26, 1994	Unreleased	Unreleased	
Operation Europe: Path to Victory 1939–1945 •Europa Sensen^{JP}	Koei	Koei	January 16, 1993	June 1994	Unreleased	
Operation Logic Bomb •Ikari no Yōsai^{JP}	Jaleco	Jaleco	April 23, 1993	September 1993	1993	
Operation Thunderbolt	Aisystem Tokyo	Taito	Unreleased	October 1994	Unreleased	
Oraga Land Shusai: Best Farmer Shūkaku-Sai	Graphic Research	Vic Tokai	March 17, 1995	Unreleased	Unreleased	
Oscar	Flair Software	Titus Software	Unreleased	October 1996	December 1996	
Osu!! Karate-bu	Culture Brain	Culture Brain	August 26, 1994	Unreleased	Unreleased	
Othello World	Dice	Tsukuda Original	April 5, 1992	Unreleased	Unreleased	
Otoboke Ninja Colosseum	Mint	Intec	February 25, 1995	Unreleased	Unreleased	
Otogirisō	Chunsoft	Chunsoft	March 7, 1992	Unreleased	Unreleased	
Out to Lunch •Pierre le Chef is... Out to Lunch^{PAL}	Mindscape	Mindscape	Unreleased	November 1993	September 1993	
Outlander	Mindscape	Mindscape	Unreleased	April 1993	1993	
Ōzumō Spirit		Takara	December 11, 1992	Unreleased	Unreleased	
P.T.O.: Pacific Theater of Operations •Teitoku no Ketsudan^{JP}	Koei	Koei	September 24, 1992	September 1993	Unreleased	
P.T.O. II: Pacific Theater of Operations •Teitoku no Ketsudan II^{JP}	Koei	Koei	February 17, 1995	December 1995	Unreleased	
Pac-Attack •Cosmo Gang the Puzzle^{JP}	Namco	Namco	February 26, 1993	October 1993	1993	
Pac-In-Time	Kalisto Entertainment	Namco (JP/NA); Mindscape (PAL)	January 3, 1995	January 1995	January 1995	
Pac-Man 2: The New Adventures •Hello! Pac-Man^{JP}	Namco	Namco (JP/NA); Nintendo (PAL)	August 26, 1994	September 1994	1994	
Pachi-Slot Kanzen Kōryaku: Universal Shindai Nyūka Volume 1		Syscom	March 7, 1997	Unreleased	Unreleased	
Pachi-Slot Kenkyū		Magical Company	July 15, 1994	Unreleased	Unreleased	
Pachi-Slot Land	I.S.C.	Carrozzeria	February 25, 1994	Unreleased	Unreleased	
Pachi-Slot Love Story		Coconuts Japan	November 19, 1993	Unreleased	Unreleased	
Pachi-Slot Monogatari: Paru Kōgyō Special	KAZe	KSS	October 27, 1995	Unreleased	Unreleased	
Pachi-Slot Monogatari: Universal Special	KAZe	KSS	July 29, 1994	Unreleased	Unreleased	
Pachi-Slot Shōbushi	Nichibutsu	Nichibutsu	December 23, 1994	Unreleased	Unreleased	
Pachinko Challenger		Carrozzeria	July 7, 1995	Unreleased	Unreleased	
Pachinko Fan: Shōri Sengen		Planning Office Wada	October 15, 1994	Unreleased	Unreleased	
Pachinko Maruhi Hisshōhō	Jorudan	VAP	November 18, 1994	Unreleased	Unreleased	
Pachinko Monogatari: Pachi-Slot mo Aru deyo!!	KAZe	KSS	May 28, 1993	Unreleased	Unreleased	
Pachinko Monogatari 2: Nagoya Shachihoko no Teiō	KAZe	KSS	January 27, 1995	Unreleased	Unreleased	
Pachinko Renchan Tengoku: Super CR Special	Jorudan	VAP	May 26, 1995	Unreleased	Unreleased	
Pachinko Wars	OeRSTED	Coconuts Japan	July 17, 1992	Unreleased	Unreleased	
Pachinko Wars II	OeRSTED	Coconuts Japan	December 17, 1993	Unreleased	Unreleased	
Pachiokun Special	Marioette	Coconuts Japan	December 11, 1992	Unreleased	Unreleased	
Pachiokun Special 2	Marioette	Coconuts Japan	May 20, 1994	Unreleased	Unreleased	
Pachiokun Special 3	Marioette	Coconuts Japan	December 1, 1995	Unreleased	Unreleased	
Packy and Marlon	WaveQuest	Raya Systems	Unreleased	June 1995	Unreleased	
The Pagemaster	Probe Entertainment	Fox Interactive (NA); Virgin Interactive Entertainment (PAL)	Unreleased	November 1994	May 23, 1995	
Paladin's Quest •Lennus: Kodai Kikai no Kioku^{JP}	Asmik Ace Entertainment	Asmik Ace Entertainment (JP); Enix (NA)	November 13, 1992	October 1993	Unreleased	
Panic in Nakayoshi World	Tom Create	Bandai	November 18, 1994	Unreleased	Unreleased	
Paperboy 2	Eastridge Technology	Mindscape	Unreleased	November 1991	1992	
Parlor! Mini: Pachinko Jikki Simulation Game		Telenet Japan	April 26, 1996	Unreleased	Unreleased	
Parlor! Mini 2: Pachinko Jikki Simulation Game		Telenet Japan	June 28, 1996	Unreleased	Unreleased	
Parlor! Mini 3: Pachinko Jikki Simulation Game		Telenet Japan	September 27, 1996	Unreleased	Unreleased	
Parlor! Mini 4: Pachinko Jikki Simulation Game		Telenet Japan	November 29, 1996	Unreleased	Unreleased	
Parlor! Mini 5: Pachinko Jikki Simulation Game		Telenet Japan	March 28, 1997	Unreleased	Unreleased	
Parlor! Mini 6: Pachinko Jikki Simulation Game		Telenet Japan	May 30, 1997	Unreleased	Unreleased	
Parlor! Mini 7: Pachinko Jikki Simulation Game		Telenet Japan	August 29, 1997	Unreleased	Unreleased	
Parodius •Parodiusu Da! Shinwa kara Owarai e^{JP}	Konami	Konami	July 3, 1992	Cancelled	1992	
The Peace Keepers •Rushing Beat Shura^{JP}	Jaleco	Jaleco	December 17, 1993	March 1994	Unreleased	
Pebble Beach no Hatō New: Tournament Edition	T&E Soft	T&E Soft	September 13, 1996	Unreleased	Unreleased	
PGA European Tour	Electronic Arts	Black Pearl Software	Unreleased	September 1996	December 1996	
PGA Tour 96	Electronic Arts	Black Pearl Software	Unreleased	January 1996	1996	
PGA Tour Golf	Polygames	Imagineer (JP); Electronic Arts (NA/PAL)	July 3, 1992	March 1992	1992	
Phalanx •Phalanx: The Enforce Fighter A-144^{JP}	Kemco	Kemco	August 7, 1992	October 1992	1992	
Phantom 2040	Viacom New Media	Viacom New Media	Unreleased	June 1995	November 1995	
Picross NP Vol. 1	Jupiter	Nintendo	April 1, 1999	Unreleased	Unreleased	
Picross NP Vol. 2	Jupiter	Nintendo	June 1, 1999	Unreleased	Unreleased	
Picross NP Vol. 3	Jupiter	Nintendo	August 1, 1999	Unreleased	Unreleased	
Picross NP Vol. 4	Jupiter	Nintendo	October 1, 1999	Unreleased	Unreleased	
Picross NP Vol. 5	Jupiter	Nintendo	December 1, 1999	Unreleased	Unreleased	
Picross NP Vol. 6	Jupiter	Nintendo	February 1, 2000	Unreleased	Unreleased	
Picross NP Vol. 7	Jupiter	Nintendo	April 1, 2000	Unreleased	Unreleased	
Picross NP Vol. 8	Jupiter	Nintendo	June 1, 2000	Unreleased	Unreleased	
Pieces •Jigsaw Party^{JP}	Prism Kikaku	Hori Electric (JP); Atlus (NA)	July 22, 1994	December 1994	Unreleased	
Pikiinya!	Crea-Tech	ASCII Entertainment	January 31, 1997	Unreleased	Unreleased	
Pilotwings	Nintendo EAD	Nintendo	December 21, 1990	August 23, 1991	1992	
Pinball Dreams •Pinball Pinball^{JP}	Spidersoft	Coconuts Japan (JP); GameTek (NA/PAL)	August 5, 1994	April 1994	August 25, 1994	
Pinball Fantasies	Spidersoft	GameTek	Unreleased	February 1995	February 1995	
Pink Goes to Hollywood •Pink Panther^{JP}	Manley & Associates	Altron (JP); TecMagik (NA/PAL)	April 15, 1994	November 1993	1993	
Pinocchio	Virgin Interactive Entertainment	Capcom (JP); Nintendo (NA/PAL)	December 20, 1996	November 11, 1996	November 28, 1996	
Pipe Dream	Tose	Bullet-Proof Software	August 7, 1992	Unreleased	Unreleased	
The Pirates of Dark Water	Sunsoft	Sunsoft	Unreleased	May 1994	1994	
Pitfall: The Mayan Adventure •Pitfall: Maya no Daibōken^{JP}	Redline Games	Pony Canyon (JP); Activision (NA/PAL)	July 14, 1995	November 1994	December 1994	
Pit-Fighter	Eastridge Technology	THQ	Unreleased	March 1992	1992	
Plok	Software Creations	Activision (JP); Tradewest (NA); Nintendo (PAL)	December 10, 1993	September 1993	December 1, 1993	
Pocky & Rocky •KiKi KaiKai: Nazo no Kuro Mantle^{JP}	Natsume Co., Ltd.	Natsume Co., Ltd.	December 22, 1992	June 1993	August 19, 1993	
Pocky & Rocky 2 •KiKi KaiKai: Tsukiyozōshi^{JP}	Natsume Co., Ltd.	Natsume Co., Ltd. (JP/NA); Ocean Software (PAL)	June 17, 1994	November 1994	April 1995	
Poi Poi Ninja World	Tom Create	Bandai	June 28, 1996	Unreleased	Unreleased	
Poko-Nyan! Henpokorin Adventure		Toho	December 22, 1994	Unreleased	Unreleased	
Pop'n TwinBee	Konami	Konami (JP); Palcom Software (PAL)	March 26, 1993	Unreleased	1993	
Pop'n TwinBee: Rainbow Bell Adventures •TwinBee: Rainbow Bell Adventure^{JP}	Konami	Konami	January 7, 1994	Cancelled	1994	
Popeye: Ijiwaru Majo Seahag no Maki •Popeye^{NA}	Technōs Japan	Technōs Japan	August 12, 1994	Cancelled	Unreleased	
Popful Mail	Falcom	Falcom	June 10, 1994	Unreleased	Unreleased	
Populous	Infinity Co., Ltd	Imagineer (JP/PAL); Acclaim Entertainment (NA)	December 16, 1990	September 1991	1992	
Populous II: Trials of the Olympian Gods	Infinity Co., Ltd	Imagineer	January 22, 1993	Unreleased	1993	
Porky Pig's Haunted Holiday	Phoenix Interactive Entertainment	Acclaim Entertainment	Unreleased	October 1995	November 1995	
Power Drive	Rage Software	U.S. Gold	Unreleased	Cancelled	November 1994	
Power Instinct •Gōketsuji Ichizoku^{JP}	Atlus	Atlus	October 14, 1994	December 1994	Unreleased	
Power Lode Runner	Atelier Double; Aeon	Nintendo	January 1, 1999	Unreleased	Unreleased	
Power Moves •Power Athlete^{JP}	System Vision	Kaneko	November 27, 1992	January 1993	October 4, 1993	
Power of the Hired	NCS Corp	NCS Corp	December 23, 1994	Unreleased	Unreleased	
Power Piggs of the Dark Age	Radical Entertainment	Titus Software	Unreleased	May 1996	September 29, 1997	
Power Rangers Zeo: Battle Racers	Natsume Co., Ltd.	Bandai	Unreleased	September 1996	Unreleased	
Power Sōkoban	Atelier Double	Nintendo	June 25, 1999	Unreleased	Unreleased	
Powermonger •Powermonger: Mashō no Bōryaku^{JP}	Bullfrog Productions	Imagineer	March 26, 1993	Unreleased	1993	
Prehistorik Man •P-Man^{JP}	Titus Software	Kemco (JP); Titus Software (NA/PAL)	June 23, 1995	January 1996	June 27, 1996	
Primal Rage	Bitmasters	Time Warner Interactive	Unreleased	August 25, 1995	August 25, 1995	
Prince of Persia	Arsys Software	Masaya (JP); Konami (NA/PAL)	July 3, 1992	November 1992	November 1, 1992	
Prince of Persia 2: The Shadow and the Flame	Titus Software	Titus Software	Unreleased	October 1996	1996	
Princess Maker: Legend of Another World	Gainax	Takara	December 15, 1995	Unreleased	Unreleased	
Princess Minerva	Atelier Double	Vic Tokai	June 23, 1995	Unreleased	Unreleased	
Pro Kishi Jinsei Simulation: Shōgi no Hanamichi	Access	Atlus	February 16, 1996	Unreleased	Unreleased	
Pro Mahjong Kiwame		Athena	June 11, 1993	Unreleased	Unreleased	
Pro Mahjong Kiwame II		Athena	July 20, 1994	Unreleased	Unreleased	
Pro Mahjong Kiwame III		Athena	June 30, 1995	Unreleased	Unreleased	
Pro Mahjong Tsuwamono		Culture Brain	April 18, 1997	Unreleased	Unreleased	
Pro Quarterback	Leland Interactive Media	Tradewest	Unreleased	December 1992	Unreleased	
Pro Sport Hockey •USA Ice Hockey^{JP}	Tose	Jaleco	March 19, 1993	February 1994	Unreleased	
Pro Yakyū Nettō: Puzzle Stadium		Coconuts Japan	April 25, 1997	Unreleased	Unreleased	
Pro Yakyū Star	Culture Brain	Culture Brain	January 17, 1997	Unreleased	Unreleased	
Psycho Dream •Dream Probe^{NA}	Riot	Telenet Japan	December 11, 1992	Cancelled	Unreleased	
Push-Over	Red Rat Software	Ocean Software	Unreleased	December 1992	1992	
Putty Squad	System 3	Ocean Software	Unreleased	Unreleased	1994	
Puzzle'n Desu!	Nichibutsu	Nichibutsu	April 14, 1995	Unreleased	Unreleased	
Q*bert 3	Realtime Associates	NTVIC	January 29, 1993	October 1992	Unreleased	
Race Drivin'	Imagineering	THQ	Unreleased	July 1992	October 1, 1992	
Radical Rex	Beam Software	Activision (NA); Laser Beam Entertainment (PAL)	Unreleased	October 1994	September 1994	
Raiden Trad •Raiden Densetsu^{JP}	Seibu Kaihatsu; Micronics	Toei Animation (JP); Electro Brain (NA)	November 29, 1991	April 1992	Unreleased	
Rampart	Bitmasters	Electronic Arts	Unreleased	August 1992	Unreleased	
Ranma ½: Akaneko-dan teki Hihō		Toho	October 22, 1993	Unreleased	Unreleased	
Ranma ½: Chōgi Rambuhen •Ranma ½ II: Anything Goes Martial Arts^{NA}	Atelier Double	Shogakukan	April 28, 1994	Cancelled	Unreleased	
Ranma ½: Hard Battle •Ranma ½^{PAL} •Ranma Nibun-no-Ichi: Bakuretsu Rantōhen^{JP}	Atelier Double	Masaya (JP); DTMC (NA); Ocean Software (PAL)	December 25, 1992	November 1993	November 12, 1993	
Ranma ½: Ōgi Jānken	Atelier Double	Shogakukan	July 21, 1995	Unreleased	Unreleased	
Rap Jam: Volume One	64WD Creation	Motown Software	Unreleased	January 1995	Unreleased	
Realm	Titus Software	Titus Software	Unreleased	December 1996	February 27, 1996	
Redline F-1 Racer •Aguri Suzuki F-1 Super Driving^{PAL} •Suzuki Aguri no F-1 Super Driving^{JP}	Genki	LOZC G. Amusements (JP); Absolute Entertainment (NA); Altron (PAL)	July 17, 1992	September 1993	1993	
Rejoice: Aretha Ōkoku no Kanata	Japan Art Media	Yanoman	April 21, 1995	Unreleased	Unreleased	
Relief Pitcher	Eastridge Technology	Left Field Entertainment	Unreleased	May 1994	Unreleased	
The Ren & Stimpy Show: Buckeroo$!	Imagineering	THQ	Unreleased	April 1995	Unreleased	
The Ren & Stimpy Show: Fire Dogs	Argonaut Software	THQ	Unreleased	June 1994	February 1995	
The Ren & Stimpy Show: Time Warp	Sculptured Software	THQ	Unreleased	November 1994	1994	
The Ren & Stimpy Show: Veediots!	Gray Matter	THQ	Unreleased	October 1993	1993	
Rendering Ranger: R2 •Targa^{PAL}	Rainbow Arts	Virgin Interactive Entertainment	November 17, 1995	Unreleased	Cancelled	
Res Arcana: Diana Ray: Uranai no Meikyū	Marionette	Coconuts Japan	April 14, 1995	Unreleased	Unreleased	
Revolution X	Rage Software	Acclaim Entertainment	March 1, 1996	December 1995	1995	
Rex Ronan: Experimental Surgeon	Sculptured Software	Raya Systems	Unreleased	May 1994	Unreleased	
Riddick Bowe Boxing •Chavez^{MX}	Malibu Interactive	Micronet (JP); Extreme Entertainment Group (NA)	November 23, 1993	January 1994	Unreleased	
Ring ni Kakero	Earthly Soft	Masaya	June 1, 1998	Unreleased	Unreleased	
Rise of the Phoenix •Kōryūki^{JP}	Koei	Koei	April 6, 1994	February 1995	Unreleased	
Rise of the Robots	Data Design Interactive	T&E Soft (JP); Acclaim Entertainment (NA/PAL)	December 22, 1994	December 1994	January 1995	
Rival Turf! •Rushing Beat^{JP}	Jaleco	Jaleco	March 27, 1992	December 1992	1993	
Road Riot 4WD	Equilibrium	THQ	Unreleased	November 1992	1992	
Road Runner's Death Valley Rally •Looney Tunes: Road Runner^{PAL} •Looney Tunes: Road Runner vs. Wile E. Coyote^{JP}	ICOM Simulations	Sunsoft	December 22, 1992	November 1992	September 30, 1993	
RoboCop 3	Ocean Software	Ocean Software	Unreleased	September 1992	November 1992	
RoboCop Versus The Terminator	Interplay Entertainment	Virgin Interactive Entertainment	Unreleased	November 1993	August 24, 1993	
Robotrek •Slap Stick^{JP}	Quintet	Enix	July 8, 1994	October 1994	Unreleased	
Rock n' Roll Racing	Silicon & Synapse	Namco (JP); Interplay Entertainment (NA/PAL)	January 3, 1994	June 1993	March 31, 1994	
The Rocketeer	NovaLogic	IGS	February 28, 1992	May 1992	Unreleased	
Rocko's Modern Life: Spunky's Dangerous Day	Viacom New Media	Viacom New Media	Unreleased	April 1994	Unreleased	
Rocky Rodent •Nitropunks: Mightheads^{JP}	Irem	Irem	July 30, 1993	September 1993	Unreleased	
Roger Clemens' MVP Baseball •MVP Baseball^{JP}	Sculptured Software	Acclaim Entertainment (JP); LJN (NA)	August 27, 1993	September 12, 1992	Unreleased	
Rokudenashi Blues: Taiketsu! Tokyo Shitennō	Tose	Bandai	April 15, 1994	Unreleased	Unreleased	
Romance of the Three Kingdoms II •Super Sangokushi II^{JP}	Koei	Koei	September 15, 1991	May 1992	Unreleased	
Romance of the Three Kingdoms III: Dragon of Destiny •Sangokushi III^{JP}	Koei	Koei	November 8, 1992	December 1993	Unreleased	
Romance of the Three Kingdoms IV: Wall of Fire •Sangokushi IV^{JP}	Koei	Koei	December 9, 1994	July 1995	Unreleased	
Romancing SaGa	Square	Square	January 28, 1992	Unreleased	Unreleased	
Romancing SaGa 2	Square	Square	December 10, 1993	Unreleased	Unreleased	
Romancing SaGa 3	Square	Square	November 11, 1995	Unreleased	Unreleased	
RPM Racing	Silicon & Synapse	Victor Interactive Software (JP); Interplay Entertainment (NA)	March 19, 1992	November 1991	Unreleased	
R-Type III: The Third Lightning	Tamtex	Irem (JP/PAL); Jaleco (NA)	December 10, 1993	October 1994	1994	
Rudra no Hihō	Square	Square	April 5, 1996	Unreleased	Unreleased	
Ruin Arm	Tose	Bandai	June 23, 1995	Unreleased	Unreleased	
Run Saber	Hori Electric	Atlus	Unreleased	June 1993	November 1993	
Ryūkihei Dan Danzarubu	Pandora Box	Yutaka	April 23, 1993	Unreleased	Unreleased	
Ryūko no Ken 2	Monolith Corporation	Saurus	December 21, 1994	Unreleased	Unreleased	
Saibara Rieko no Mahjong Hōrōki	Natsume Co., Ltd.	Taito	February 10, 1995	Unreleased	Unreleased	
Saikōsoku Shikō Shōgi Mahjong		Varie	March 31, 1995	Unreleased	Unreleased	
Saikyō: Takada Nobuhiko	Dual	Hudson Soft	December 27, 1995	Unreleased	Unreleased	
Sailor Moon •Bishōjo Senshi Sailor Moon^{JP}	Angel	Angel (JP); Bandai (PAL)	August 27, 1993	Unreleased	November 1994	
Sakurai Shōichi no Jankiryū: Mahjong Hisshōhō	J-Force	Sammy Corporation	September 14, 1995	Unreleased	Unreleased	
Same Game	Hudson Soft	Hudson Soft	March 1, 1996	Unreleased	Unreleased	
Samurai Shodown •Samurai Spirits^{JP}	Takara	Takara	September 22, 1994	November 1994	1994	
Sangokushi Eiketsuden		Koei	December 28, 1995	Unreleased	Unreleased	
Sangokushi Seishi: Tenbu Spirits	Wolf Team	Wolf Team	June 25, 1993	Unreleased	Unreleased	
Sankyo Fever! Fever!		Telenet Japan	October 28, 1994	Unreleased	Unreleased	
Sanrio Shanghai	SAS Sakata	Character Soft	August 31, 1994	Unreleased	Unreleased	
Sanrio World Smash Ball!	Ape; Tomcat System	Character Soft	July 16, 1993	Unreleased	Unreleased	
Sansara Naga 2		Victor Interactive Software	July 15, 1994	Unreleased	Unreleased	
Saturday Night Slam Masters •Muscle Bomber: The Body Explosion^{JP}	Capcom	Capcom	March 30, 1994	June 1994	September 1994	
Scooby-Doo Mystery	Argonaut Software	Acclaim Entertainment	Unreleased	November 1995	Unreleased	
SD F-1 Grand Prix	Video System	Video System	October 27, 1995	Unreleased	Unreleased	
SD Gundam G Next	Japan Art Media	Bandai	December 22, 1995	Unreleased	Unreleased	
SD Gundam Gaiden: Knight Gundam Monogatari: Ooinaru Isan	Tose	Angel	December 21, 1991	Unreleased	Unreleased	
SD Gundam Gaiden 2: Entaku no Kishi	Tose	Yutaka	December 18, 1992	Unreleased	Unreleased	
SD Gundam Generation: Axis Senki	Tom Create	Bandai	August 23, 1996	Unreleased	Unreleased	
SD Gundam Generation: Babylonia Kenkoku Senki	Tom Create	Bandai	August 23, 1996	Unreleased	Unreleased	
SD Gundam Generation: Colony Kakutōki	Tom Create	Bandai	September 27, 1996	Unreleased	Unreleased	
SD Gundam Generation: Gryps Senki	Tom Create	Bandai	July 26, 1996	Unreleased	Unreleased	
SD Gundam Generation: Ichinen Sensōki	Tom Create	Bandai	July 26, 1996	Unreleased	Unreleased	
SD Gundam Generation: Zanscare Senki	Tom Create	Bandai	September 27, 1996	Unreleased	Unreleased	
SD Gundam GX	BEC	Bandai	May 27, 1994	Unreleased	Unreleased	
SD Gundam Power Formation Puzzle	Tom Create	Bandai	January 26, 1996	Unreleased	Unreleased	
Super Gachapon World: SD Gundam X	BEC	Yutaka	September 18, 1992	Unreleased	Unreleased	
SD Hiryū no Ken •Galactic Defender^{NA}		Culture Brain	June 17, 1994	Cancelled	Unreleased	
SD Kidō Senshi Gundam: V Sakusen Shidō	Tose	Angel	September 12, 1992	Unreleased	Unreleased	
SD Kidō Senshi Gundam 2	Tose	Angel	September 23, 1993	Unreleased	Unreleased	
SD the Great Battle	Banpresto	Banpresto	December 29, 1990	Cancelled	Unreleased	
SD Ultra Battle: Seven Densetsu	Tom Create	Bandai	June 28, 1996	Unreleased	Unreleased	
SD Ultra Battle: Ultraman Densetsu	Tom Create	Bandai	June 28, 1996	Unreleased	Unreleased	
SeaQuest DSV	Sculptured Software	Malibu Games	Unreleased	January 1995	July 27, 1995	
Secret of Evermore	Square	Square (NA); Nintendo (PAL)	Unreleased	October 1995	February 22, 1996	
Secret of Mana •Seiken Densetsu 2^{JP}	Square	Square (JP/NA); Nintendo (PAL)	August 6, 1993	October 1993	November 25, 1994	
Secret of the Stars •Aqutallion^{JP}	Tecmo	Tecmo	November 5, 1993	July 1995	Unreleased	
Seifuku Densetsu: Pretty Fighter		Imagineer	December 2, 1994	Unreleased	Unreleased	
Seijū Maden: Beasts & Blades		Bullet-Proof Software	December 15, 1995	Unreleased	Unreleased	
Seiken Densetsu 3 •Secret of Mana 2^{NA}	Square	Square	September 30, 1995	Cancelled	Unreleased	
Sengoku Denshō •Sengoku^{NA}		Data East	September 22, 1993	Cancelled	Unreleased	
Sengoku no Hasha	Bits Laboratory	Banpresto	December 22, 1995	Unreleased	Unreleased	
Sensible Soccer: European Champions	Sensible Software	Sony Imagesoft	Unreleased	Unreleased	February 1994	
Sgt. Saunders' Combat!	Play Avenue; Chickenhead	ASCII Entertainment	September 29, 1995	Unreleased	Unreleased	
Shadowrun	Beam Software	Data East	March 25, 1994	May 1993	August 1993	
Shanghai: Banri no Chōjō	Success; Kūsōkagaku	Sunsoft	November 17, 1995	Unreleased	Unreleased	
Shanghai II: Dragon's Eye •Super Shanghai: Dragon's Eye^{JP}	Hot-B	Hot-B (JP); Activision (NA/PAL)	January 24, 1992	February 1993	1993	
Shanghai III	Success; Kūsōkagaku	Sunsoft	September 15, 1994	Unreleased	Unreleased	
Shaq Fu	Delphine Software International	Electronic Arts (NA); Ocean Software (PAL)	Unreleased	October 28, 1994	October 28, 1994	
Shien's Revenge •Shien: The Blade Chaser^{JP}	Almanic	Dynamic Planning (JP); Vic Tokai (NA)	April 8, 1994	October 1994	Unreleased	
Shigetaka Kashiwagi's Top Water Bassing	Imagesoft	VAP	February 17, 1995	Unreleased	Unreleased	
Shijō Saikyō League Serie A: Ace Striker		TNN	March 31, 1995	Unreleased	Unreleased	
Shijō Saikyō no Quiz Ō Ketteisen Super	ISCO	Yonezawa PR21	December 28, 1992	Unreleased	Unreleased	
Shiki Eiyūden		Outrigger Koubou	July 7, 1995	Unreleased	Unreleased	
Shimono Masaki no Fishing to Bassing	Natsume Co., Ltd.	Natsume Co., Ltd.	October 16, 1994	Unreleased	Unreleased	
Shin Ikkaku Senkin	Jorudan	VAP	July 7, 1995	Unreleased	Unreleased	
Shin Kidō Senki Gundam Wing: Endless Duel		Bandai	March 29, 1996	Unreleased	Unreleased	
Shin Mahjong		Konami	March 30, 1994	Unreleased	Unreleased	
Shin Megami Tensei	Atlus	Atlus	October 30, 1992	Unreleased	Unreleased	
Shin Megami Tensei if...	Atlus	Atlus	October 28, 1994	Unreleased	Unreleased	
Shin Megami Tensei II	Atlus	Atlus	March 18, 1994	Unreleased	Unreleased	
Shin Momotarō Densetsu		Hudson Soft	December 24, 1993	Unreleased	Unreleased	
Shin Naki no Ryū: Mahjong Hishō-den		BEC	October 27, 1995	Unreleased	Unreleased	
Shin Nekketsu Kōha: Kunio-tachi no Banka	Almanic	Technōs Japan	April 29, 1994	Unreleased	Unreleased	
Shin Nippon Pro Wrestling: Chō Senshi in Tokyo Dome		Varie	September 14, 1993	Unreleased	Unreleased	
Shin Nippon Pro Wrestling '94: Battlefield in Tokyo Dome		Varie	August 12, 1994	Unreleased	Unreleased	
Shin Nippon Pro Wrestling '95: Tokyo Dome Battle 7		Varie	June 30, 1995	Unreleased	Unreleased	
Shin SD Sengokuden: Taishōgun Retsuden	BEC	BEC	April 21, 1995	Unreleased	Unreleased	
Shin Seikoku: La Wares	J-Force	Yutaka	April 21, 1995	Unreleased	Unreleased	
Shin Shōgi Club	Natsu System	Hect	September 22, 1995	Unreleased	Unreleased	
Shin Togenkyo		Banpresto	September 22, 1995	Unreleased	Unreleased	
The Shinri Game: Akuma no Kokoroji		Visit	March 26, 1993	Unreleased	Unreleased	
The Shinri Game 2: Magical Trip		Visit	February 10, 1995	Unreleased	Unreleased	
The Shinri Game 3	Ukiyotei	Visit	August 25, 1995	Unreleased	Unreleased	
Shinseiki Odysselya •Lost Mission^{NA}	Vic Tokai	Vic Tokai	June 18, 1993	Cancelled	Unreleased	
Shinseiki Odysselya II	Vic Tokai	Vic Tokai	October 6, 1995	Unreleased	Unreleased	
Shinzui Taikyoku Igo: Go Sennin	Jorudan	J-Wing	June 2, 1995	Unreleased	Unreleased	
Shiroi Ringu he	Opera House	Pony Canyon	October 27, 1995	Unreleased	Unreleased	
Shodai Nekketsu Kōha Kunio-kun	Technōs Japan	Technōs Japan	August 7, 1992	Unreleased	Unreleased	
Shodan Morita Shōgi		SETA	August 23, 1991	Unreleased	Unreleased	
Shodankurai Nintei: Shodan Pro Mahjong	Khaos	Gaps	April 28, 1995	Unreleased	Unreleased	
Shōgi: Fūrinkazan		Pony Canyon	October 29, 1993	Unreleased	Unreleased	
Shōgi Club	Natsu System	Hect	February 24, 1995	Unreleased	Unreleased	
Shōgi Saikyō		Magical Company	July 21, 1995	Unreleased	Unreleased	
Shōgi Saikyō 2: Jissen Taikyoku Hen		Magical Company	February 9, 1996	Unreleased	Unreleased	
Shōgi Sanmai		Virgin Interactive Entertainment	December 22, 1995	Unreleased	Unreleased	
Shōnen Ashibe	Nova Games	Takara	December 22, 1992	Unreleased	Unreleased	
Shōnen Ninja Sasuke		Sunsoft	October 28, 1994	Unreleased	Unreleased	
Shōnin yo Taishi wo Idake!!	AIM	Bandai	December 15, 1995	Unreleased	Unreleased	
Shutokō Battle '94: Drift King Keichii Tsuchiya & Masaaki Bandō	Genki	Bullet-Proof Software	May 27, 1994	Unreleased	Unreleased	
Shutokō Battle 2: Drift King Keichii Tsuchiya & Masaaki Bandō	Genki	Bullet-Proof Software	February 24, 1995	Unreleased	Unreleased	
Shūshoku Game	Lenar	Imagineer	July 28, 1995	Unreleased	Unreleased	
Sid Meier's Civilization •Sid Meier's Civilization: Sekai Nana Dai Bunmei^{JP}	Microprose	Koei	October 7, 1994	June 1995	Unreleased	
Side Pocket	Iguana Entertainment	Data East	March 18, 1994	December 1993	1994	
Silva Saga II: The Legend of Light and Darkness	SETA	SETA	June 25, 1993	Unreleased	Unreleased	
SimAnt	Tomcat System	Imagineer (JP); Maxis (NA)	February 26, 1993	October 1993	Unreleased	
SimCity	Nintendo EAD; Intelligent Systems	Nintendo	April 26, 1991	August 23, 1991	September 24, 1992	
SimCity 2000	HAL Laboratory	Imagineer (JP); Black Pearl Software (NA); THQ (PAL)	May 26, 1995	October 15, 1996	December 19, 1996	
SimCity Jr.		Imagineer	July 26, 1996	Unreleased	Unreleased	
SimEarth •SimEarth: The Living Planet^{JP}	Tomcat System	Imagineer (JP); FCI (NA)	December 29, 1991	February 1993	Unreleased	
The Simpsons: Bart's Nightmare •The Simpsons: Bart no Fushigi na Yume no Daibōken^{JP}	Sculptured Software	Acclaim Entertainment	February 26, 1993	October 1992	February 18, 1993	
Simulation Pro Yakyū	Hect	Hect	April 28, 1995	Unreleased	Unreleased	
Sink or Swim	Zeppelin Games	Titus Software	Unreleased	November 1996	December 31, 1994	
Sküljagger: Revolt of the Westicans	Realtime Associates	American Softworks	Unreleased	October 1992	Unreleased	
Skyblazer •Karura Ō^{JP}	Ukiyotei	Epic/Sony Records (JP); Sony Imagesoft (NA/PAL)	February 18, 1994	January 1994	March 25, 1994	
Slayers	BEC	Banpresto	June 24, 1994	Unreleased	Unreleased	
Smart Ball •Jerry Boy^{JP}	Game Freak; System Sacom	Epic/Sony Records (JP); Sony Imagesoft (NA)	September 13, 1991	March 1992	Unreleased	
Smash Tennis •Super Family Tennis^{JP}	Namco	Namco (JP); Virgin Interactive Entertainment (PAL)	June 25, 1993	Unreleased	1994	
The Smurfs	Infogrames	Infogrames	Unreleased	Unreleased	1994	
The Smurfs Travel The World	Infogrames	Infogrames	Unreleased	Unreleased	1996	
Snoopy Concert	Pax Softonica	Mitsui Fudosan	May 19, 1995	Unreleased	Unreleased	
Snow White: Happily Ever After	Imagitec Design	American Softworks	Unreleased	October 1994	Unreleased	
Soccer Kid •The Adventures of Kid Kleets^{NA}	Krisalis Software	Yanoman (JP); Ocean Software (NA/PAL)	December 28, 1993	August 1994	June 1994	
Solid Runner	Sting Entertainment	ASCII Entertainment	March 28, 1997	Unreleased	Unreleased	
Song Master	Japan Art Media	Yanoman	November 27, 1992	Unreleased	Unreleased	
Sonic Blast Man	I.T.L; Zuntata	Taito	September 25, 1992	February 1993	1993	
Sonic Blast Man II	Taito; I.T.L	Taito	March 18, 1994	November 1994	Unreleased	
Soreyuke Ebisumaru Karakuri Meiro: Kieta Goemon no Nazo!!	Konami	Konami	March 29, 1996	Unreleased	Unreleased	
SOS •Septentrion^{JP}	Human Entertainment	Human Entertainment (JP); Vic Tokai (NA)	May 28, 1993	April 1994	Unreleased	
Sotsugyō Bangai Hen: Nee Mahjong Shiyo!		KSS	October 28, 1994	Unreleased	Unreleased	
Sougō Kakutōgi: Astral Bout	A-Wave	King Records	June 26, 1992	Unreleased	Unreleased	
Sōgō Kakutōgi: Astral Bout 2: The Total Fighters	A-Wave	King Records	February 25, 1994	Unreleased	Unreleased	
Sōgō Kakutōgi Rings: Astral Bout 3	A-Wave	King Records	October 20, 1995	Unreleased	Unreleased	
Sōkō Kihei Votoms: The Battling Road	Genki	Takara	October 29, 1993	Unreleased	Unreleased	
Soul & Sword	Pandora Box	Zamuse	November 26, 1993	Unreleased	Unreleased	
Soul Blazer •Soul Blader^{JP}	Quintet	Enix	January 31, 1992	August 1992	January 27, 1994	
Sound Novel Tsukūru	Success	ASCII Entertainment	May 31, 1996	Unreleased	Unreleased	
Space Ace	Oxford Digital Enterprises	Imagineer (JP); Absolute Entertainment (NA); Empire Interactive (PAL)	March 25, 1994	May 1994	1994	
Space Football: One on One •Super Linearball^{JP}	Bits Studios	Triffix	November 6, 1992	June 1992	Unreleased	
Space Invaders •Space Invaders: The Original Game^{JP}	Taito	Taito (JP); Nintendo (NA/PAL)	March 25, 1994	November 3, 1997	1997	
Space Megaforce •Super Aleste^{PAL, JP}	Compile	Toho	April 28, 1992	October 1992	1992	
Spanky's Quest •Hansei Zaru: Jirō-kun no Daibōken^{JP}	Natsume Co., Ltd.	Natsume Co., Ltd.	December 27, 1991	July 1992	1992	
Spark World		Den'Z	May 26, 1995	Unreleased	Unreleased	
Sparkster	Konami	Konami	September 15, 1994	October 1994	1994	
Spectre	Synergistic Software	Cybersoft (NA); GameTek (PAL)	Unreleased	May 1994	July 1994	
Speed Racer in My Most Dangerous Adventures	Radical Entertainment	Accolade	Unreleased	November 1994	Unreleased	
Speedy Gonzales: Los Gatos Bandidos	Sunsoft	Acclaim Entertainment	Unreleased	August 1995	Cancelled	
Spider-Man	Western Technologies	LJN	Unreleased	February 1995	March 1995	
Spider-Man and Venom: Maximum Carnage	Software Creations	LJN	Unreleased	September 16, 1994	November 24, 1994	
Spider-Man and the X-Men in Arcade's Revenge	Software Creations	LJN	Unreleased	November 1, 1992	August 19, 1993	
Spindizzy Worlds	ASCII Entertainment	ASCII Entertainment (JP/NA); Activision (PAL)	August 7, 1992	March 1993	1992	
Spirou	Infogrames	Infogrames	Unreleased	Unreleased	September 29, 1995	
The Sporting News: Power Baseball	Now Production	Hudson Soft	Unreleased	June 1995	Unreleased	
Sports Illustrated: Championship Football & Baseball •All-American Championship Football^{PAL}	Malibu Games	Malibu Games	Unreleased	February 1994	1994	
Spriggan Powered	Micronics	Naxat Soft	July 26, 1996	Unreleased	Unreleased	
Sprinter Monogatari: Mezase!! Ikkaku Senkin	Video and Audio Project	Video and Audio Project	April 17, 1995	Unreleased	Unreleased	
St. Andrews: Eikō to Rekishi no Old Course		Epoch Co.	September 15, 1995	Unreleased	Unreleased	
Star Fox •Starwing^{PAL}	Nintendo EAD; Argonaut Software	Nintendo	February 21, 1993	March 23, 1993	June 3, 1993	
Star Ocean	tri-Ace	Enix	July 19, 1996	Unreleased	Unreleased	
Star Trek: Deep Space Nine – Crossroads of Time	Novotrade	Playmates Interactive Entertainment (NA); Virgin Interactive Entertainment (PAL)	Unreleased	September 1995	1995	
Star Trek: Starfleet Academy - Starship Bridge Simulator	Interplay Entertainment	Interplay Entertainment	Unreleased	December 1994	1994	
Star Trek: The Next Generation – Future's Past •Shin Star Trek: The Next Generation: Ooinaru Isan IDF no Nazo wo Oe^{JP}	Spectrum HoloByte	Spectrum HoloByte	November 17, 1994	March 1994	1994	
Stardust Suplex		Varie	January 20, 1995	Unreleased	Unreleased	
Stargate	Tantalus Interactive	Acclaim Entertainment	May 26, 1995	April 1995	June 29, 1995	
Stealth	Axes Art Amuse	Hect	December 18, 1992	Unreleased	Unreleased	
Steel Talons	Panoramic	Left Field Entertainment	Unreleased	November 1993	Unreleased	
Sterling Sharpe: End 2 End	Tose	Jaleco	Unreleased	March 1995	Unreleased	
Stone Protectors	Eurocom Entertainment Software	Kemco	April 28, 1995	November 1994	Unreleased	
Street Combat •Ranma ½: Chōnai Gekitōhen^{JP}	NCS Corp; Opus; Winds	Masaya (JP); Irem (NA/PAL)	March 27, 1992	April 1993	July 1993	
Street Fighter Alpha 2 •Street Fighter Zero 2^{JP}	Capcom	Capcom (JP); Nintendo (NA/PAL)	December 20, 1996	October 28, 1996	December 19, 1996	
Street Fighter II: The World Warrior	Capcom	Capcom	June 10, 1992	July 15, 1992	October 5, 1992	
Street Fighter II Turbo: Hyper Fighting	Capcom	Capcom	July 10, 1993	August 1993	October 1993	
Street Hockey '95	GTE Interactive Media	GTE Interactive Media	Unreleased	November 1994	Unreleased	
Street Racer	Vivid Image	Ubisoft	December 2, 1994	December 1994	December 8, 1994	
Strike Gunner S.T.G •Super Strike Gunner^{PAL}	Athena	Athena (JP); NTVIC (NA); Activision (PAL)	March 27, 1992	October 1992	November 1992	
Striker •World Soccer '94: Road to Glory^{NA} •Eric Cantona Football Challenge^{FR} •World Soccer^{JP}	Rage Software	Coconuts Japan (JP); Atlus (NA); Elite Systems (PAL)	July 16, 1993	December 1993	October 1993	
Stunt Race FX •Wild Trax^{JP}	Nintendo EAD; Argonaut Software	Nintendo	June 4, 1994	July 1994	October 27, 1994	
Sugoi Hebereke	OLM; Sunsoft	Sunsoft	March 11, 1994	Unreleased	Unreleased	
Sugoro Quest ++ Dicenics	Technōs Japan	Technōs Japan	December 9, 1994	Unreleased	Unreleased	
Sugoroku Ginga Senki	Bottom Up	Bottom Up	December 19, 1996	Unreleased	Unreleased	
Sun Sport Fishing: Keiryū-Ō	Lenar	Imagineer	December 22, 1994	Unreleased	Unreleased	
Sunset Riders	Konami	Konami (NA); Palcom Software (PAL)	Unreleased	October 1993	October 1993	
Supapoon	Now Production	Yutaka	October 6, 1995	Unreleased	Unreleased	
Supapoon DX	Now Production	Yutaka	May 31, 1996	Unreleased	Unreleased	
Super Adventure Island •Takahashi Meijin no Daibōken Jima^{JP}	Produce	Hudson Soft	January 11, 1992	April 1992	November 19, 1992	
Super Adventure Island II •Takahashi Meijin no Daibōken Jima II ^{JP}	Make	Hudson Soft	January 3, 1995	October 1994	March 1995	
Super Air Diver 2	Copya Systems	Asmik Ace Entertainment	March 3, 1995	Unreleased	Unreleased	
The Super Aquatic Games Starring the Aquabats •James Pond's Crazy Sports^{PAL}	Vectordean	Seika Corporation (NA); Sales Curve Interactive (PAL)	Unreleased	October 1993	1994	
Super Back to the Future II	Invictus	Toshiba EMI	July 23, 1993	Unreleased	Unreleased	
Super Baken Ō '95		Techiku	March 24, 1995	Unreleased	Unreleased	
Super Baseball 2020	Monolith Corporation	K Amusement Leasing (JP); Tradewest (NA)	March 12, 1993	July 1993	Unreleased	
Super Baseball Simulator 1.000 •Super Ultra Baseball^{JP}	Culture Brain	Culture Brain	July 12, 1991	December 1991	Unreleased	
Super Bases Loaded •Super Professional Baseball^{JP}	Tose	Jaleco	May 17, 1991	September 1991	Unreleased	
Super Bases Loaded 2 •Super 3D Baseball^{JP} •Korean Pro Baseball^{KR}	Tose	Jaleco	October 1, 1993	February 1994	Unreleased	
Super Bases Loaded 3: License to Steal •Super Moero!! Pro Yakyū^{JP}	Tose	Jaleco	December 23, 1994	February 1995	Unreleased	
Super Batter Up •Super Famista^{JP}	Namco	Namco	March 27, 1992	October 1992	Unreleased	
Super Battleship	World Builders Synergistic	Mindscape	Unreleased	November 1993	1994	
Super Battletank 2	Absolute Entertainment	Absolute Entertainment	May 27, 1994	January 1994	August 8, 1994	
Super Bikkuriman	Tom Create	BEC	January 29, 1993	Unreleased	Unreleased	
Super Birdie Rush	Data East	Data East	March 6, 1992	Unreleased	Unreleased	
Super Black Bass	Starfish	Hot-B	December 4, 1992	May 1993	Unreleased	
Super Black Bass 3	Starfish	Starfish	December 15, 1995	Unreleased	Unreleased	
Super Bomberman: Panic Bomber W	Raizing	Hudson Soft	March 1, 1995	Unreleased (Note: Localized into English and released in North American and/or PAL regions as part of Super Bomberman Collection (2026))	Unreleased	
Super Bomberman	Produce	Hudson Soft	April 28, 1993	September 1993	November 20, 1993	
Super Bomberman 2	Produce	Hudson Soft	April 28, 1994	September 1994	November 1994	
Super Bomberman 3	Hudson Soft	Hudson Soft (JP); Virgin Interactive Entertainment (PAL)	April 28, 1995	Unreleased	October 1995	
Super Bomberman 4	Produce	Hudson Soft	April 26, 1996	Unreleased	Unreleased	
Super Bomberman 5	Hudson Soft	Hudson Soft	February 28, 1997	Unreleased	Unreleased	
Super Bombliss	Tose	Bullet-Proof Software	March 17, 1995	Unreleased	Unreleased	
Super Bonk •Super B.C. Kid^{PAL} •Chō Genjin^{JP}	A.I. Company Ltd.	Hudson Soft	July 22, 1994	November 1994	1995	
Super Bowling	KID	Athena (JP); American Technōs (NA)	July 3, 1992	September 1992	Unreleased	
Super Buster Bros. •Super Pang^{PAL, JP}	Capcom	Capcom	August 7, 1992	October 1992	1992	
Super Caesars Palace •Super Casino: Caesars Palace^{JP}	Illusion Softworks	Coconuts Japan (JP); Virgin Interactive Entertainment (NA)	October 21, 1993	August 1993	Unreleased	
Super Casino 2	OeRSTED	Coconuts Japan	July 14, 1995	Unreleased	Unreleased	
Super Castles		Victor Interactive Software	December 22, 1994	Unreleased	Unreleased	
Super Castlevania IV •Akumajō Dracula^{JP}	Konami	Konami	October 31, 1991	December 1991	August 27, 1992	
Super Chase H.Q. •Super H.Q. Criminal Chaser^{JP}	Taito	Taito	November 26, 1993	December 1993	1993	
Super Chinese Fighter		Culture Brain	January 3, 1995	Unreleased	Unreleased	
Super Chinese World 2: Uchū Ichi Butō Taikai		Culture Brain	October 29, 1993	Unreleased	Unreleased	
Super Chinese World 3: Chō Jigen Daisakusen		Culture Brain	December 22, 1995	Unreleased	Unreleased	
Super Conflict	Manley & Associates	Vic Tokai	Unreleased	March 1993	1994	
Super Dany	Cryo Interactive	Virgin Interactive Entertainment	Unreleased	Unreleased	1994	
Super Double Dragon •Return of Double Dragon^{JP}	Technōs Japan	Technōs Japan (JP); Tradewest (NA/PAL)	October 16, 1992	October 1992	September 30, 1993	
Super Double Yakuman		VAP	April 1, 1994	Unreleased	Unreleased	
Super Double Yakuman II		VAP	March 14, 1997	Unreleased	Unreleased	
Super Drift Out	Dragnet	Visco Corporation	February 24, 1995	Cancelled	Unreleased	
Super Dimension Fortress Macross: Scrambled Valkyrie	Winkysoft	Zamuse	October 29, 1993	Unreleased	Unreleased	
Super Dunk Star •Super Jam^{NA}	C-Lab	Sammy Corporation	April 28, 1993	Cancelled	Unreleased	
Super F1 Circus	Cream	Nichibutsu	July 24, 1992	Unreleased	Unreleased	
Super F1 Circus 2	Cream	Nichibutsu	July 29, 1993	Unreleased	Unreleased	
Super F1 Circus 3	Cream	Nichibutsu	July 15, 1994	Unreleased	Unreleased	
Super F1 Circus Gaiden	Cream	Nichibutsu	July 7, 1995	Unreleased	Unreleased	
Super F1 Circus Limited	Cream	Nichibutsu	October 23, 1992	Unreleased	Unreleased	
Super F1 Hero	Aprinet	Varie	December 18, 1992	Unreleased	Unreleased	
Super Famicom Wars	Intelligent Systems	Nintendo	May 1, 1998	Unreleased	Unreleased	
Super Family Circuit	Game Studio	Namco	October 21, 1994	Unreleased	Unreleased	
Super Family Gelände		Namco	February 1, 1998	Unreleased	Unreleased	
Super Famista 2	Namco	Namco	March 12, 1993	Unreleased	Unreleased	
Super Famista 3	Namco	Namco	March 4, 1994	Unreleased	Unreleased	
Super Famista 4	Namco	Namco	March 3, 1995	Unreleased	Unreleased	
Super Famista 5	Namco	Namco	February 29, 1996	Unreleased	Unreleased	
Super Final Match Tennis	Human Entertainment	Human Entertainment	August 12, 1994	Unreleased	Unreleased	
Super Fire Pro Wrestling	Human Club	Human Entertainment	December 20, 1991	Unreleased	Unreleased	
Super Fire Pro Wrestling: Queen's Special	Human Club	Human Entertainment	June 30, 1995	Unreleased	Unreleased	
Super Fire Pro Wrestling 2	Human Club	Human Entertainment	December 25, 1992	Unreleased	Unreleased	
Super Fire Pro Wrestling 3 Easy Type	Human Club	Human Entertainment	February 4, 1994	Unreleased	Unreleased	
Super Fire Pro Wrestling 3 Final Bout	Human Club	Human Entertainment	December 25, 1993	Unreleased	Unreleased	
Super Fire Pro Wrestling Special	Human Club	Human Entertainment	December 22, 1994	Unreleased	Unreleased	
Super Fire Pro Wrestling X	Human Club	Human Entertainment	December 22, 1995	Unreleased	Unreleased	
Super Fire Pro Wrestling X Premium	Human Club	Human Entertainment	March 29, 1996	Unreleased	Unreleased	
Super Fishing: Big Fight	Geo Factory	Naxat Soft	December 20, 1994	Unreleased	Unreleased	
Super Formation Soccer 94: World Cup Edition	Human Entertainment	Human Entertainment	June 17, 1994	Unreleased	Unreleased	
Super Formation Soccer 94: World Cup Final Data	Human Entertainment	Human Entertainment	September 22, 1994	Unreleased	Unreleased	
Super Formation Soccer 95: della Serie A	Human Entertainment	Human Entertainment	March 31, 1995	Unreleased	Unreleased	
Super Formation Soccer 96: World Club Edition	Human Entertainment	Human Entertainment	March 29, 1996	Unreleased	Unreleased	
Super Formation Soccer II	Human Entertainment	Human Entertainment	June 11, 1993	Unreleased	Unreleased	
Super Genjin 2	A.I. Company Ltd.	Hudson Soft	July 28, 1995	Unreleased	Unreleased	
Super Ghouls 'n Ghosts •Chō Makaimura^{JP}	Capcom	Capcom (JP/NA); Nintendo (PAL)	October 4, 1991	November 1991	December 10, 1992	
Super Goal! 2 •Takeda Nobuhiro no Super Cup Soccer^{JP}	Tose	Jaleco	November 26, 1993	April 1994	Unreleased	
Super Godzilla •Chō-Godzilla^{JP}	Advance Communication Company	Toho	December 23, 1993	July 1994	Unreleased	
Super Gomoku Narabe Renju	Naxat Soft	Naxat Soft	March 25, 1994	Unreleased	Unreleased	
Super Gomoku Shōgi		Nichibutsu	November 18, 1994	Unreleased	Unreleased	
Super Gussun Oyoyo	Kan's	Banpresto	August 11, 1995	Unreleased	Unreleased	
Super Gussun Oyoyo 2	Kan's	Banpresto	May 24, 1996	Unreleased	Unreleased	
Super Hanafuda	Use	I'MAX	August 5, 1994	Unreleased	Unreleased	
Super Hanafuda 2	Use	I'MAX	October 20, 1995	Unreleased	Unreleased	
Super High Impact	Iguana Entertainment	Acclaim Entertainment	July 9, 1993	June 1993	Unreleased	
Super Honmei: GI Seiha		Nichibutsu	February 25, 1994	Unreleased	Unreleased	
Super Ice Hockey •Super Hockey '94^{JP}	Opera House	Sunsoft	March 25, 1994	Unreleased	1994	
Super Igo Go Ō		Naxat Soft	April 8, 1994	Unreleased	Unreleased	
Super Indy Champ	Opensystem	Forum	April 1, 1994	Unreleased	Unreleased	
Super International Cricket	Beam Software	Nintendo	Unreleased	Unreleased	July 1995	
Super James Pond •Super James Pond II^{JP}	Vectordean	Victor Interactive Software (JP); American Softworks (NA); Ocean Software (PAL)	July 23, 1993	July 1993	September 1993	
Super Jangō		Victor Interactive Software	March 17, 1995	Unreleased	Unreleased	
Super Jinsei Game	Takara	Takara	March 18, 1994	Unreleased	Unreleased	
Super Jinsei Game 2	Takara	Takara	September 8, 1995	Unreleased	Unreleased	
Super Jinsei Game 3	Takara	Takara	November 29, 1996	Unreleased	Unreleased	
Super Keiba		I'MAX	August 10, 1993	Unreleased	Unreleased	
Super Keiba 2	Tomcat System	I'MAX	May 19, 1995	Unreleased	Unreleased	
Super Keirin	Betop	I'MAX	July 14, 1995	Unreleased	Unreleased	
Super Kōkō Yakyū: Ichikyū Jikkon		I'MAX	August 5, 1994	Unreleased	Unreleased	
Super Kyōsōba: Kaze no Sylphid		King Records	October 8, 1993	Unreleased	Unreleased	
Super Kyotei		Nichibutsu	June 30, 1995	Unreleased	Unreleased	
Super Kyotei 2		Nichibutsu	April 26, 1996	Unreleased	Unreleased	
Super Kyūkyoku Harikiri Stadium		Taito	December 3, 1993	Unreleased	Unreleased	
Super Kyūkyoku Harikiri Stadium 2	Now Production	Taito	August 12, 1994	Unreleased	Unreleased	
Super Loopz	Graffiti	Imagineer	March 4, 1994	Cancelled	Cancelled	
Super Mad Champ	Givro	Tsukuda Original	March 4, 1995	Unreleased	Unreleased	
Super Mahjong		I'MAX	August 22, 1992	Unreleased	Unreleased	
Super Mahjong 2: Honkaku 4 Nin Uchi!		I'MAX	December 2, 1993	Unreleased	Unreleased	
Super Mahjong 3: Karakuchi		I'MAX	November 25, 1994	Unreleased	Unreleased	
Super Mahjong Taikai		Koei	September 12, 1992	Unreleased	Unreleased	
Super Mario All-Stars •Super Mario Collection^{JP}	Nintendo EAD	Nintendo	July 14, 1993	August 1993	December 16, 1993	
Super Mario All-Stars + Super Mario World	Nintendo EAD	Nintendo	Unreleased	December 1994	1995	
Super Mario Kart	Nintendo EAD	Nintendo	August 27, 1992	September 1992	January 21, 1993	
Super Mario RPG: Legend of the Seven Stars •Super Mario RPG^{JP}	Square	Nintendo	March 9, 1996	May 13, 1996	Unreleased	
Super Mario World •Super Mario World: Super Mario Bros. 4^{JP}	Nintendo EAD	Nintendo	November 21, 1990	August 23, 1991	April 11, 1992	
Super Mario World 2: Yoshi's Island •Super Mario: Yossy Island^{JP}	Nintendo EAD	Nintendo	August 5, 1995	October 1995	October 5, 1995	
Super Metroid	Nintendo R&D1; Intelligent Systems	Nintendo	March 19, 1994	April 18, 1994	July 28, 1994	
Super Momotarō Dentetsu DX	Make	Hudson Soft	December 8, 1995	Unreleased	Unreleased	
Super Momotarō Dentetsu II	Make	Hudson Soft	August 7, 1992	Unreleased	Unreleased	
Super Momotarō Dentetsu III	Make	Hudson Soft	December 9, 1994	Unreleased	Unreleased	
Super Morph	Millennium Interactive	Sony Imagesoft	Unreleased	Unreleased	1993	
Super Naxat Open: Golf de Shōbu da! Dorabocchan	KID; Kūsoukagaku	Naxat Soft	March 18, 1994	Unreleased	Unreleased	
Super Nazo Puyo: Rurū no Rū	Compile	Banpresto	May 26, 1995	Unreleased	Unreleased	
Super Nazo Puyo Tsū: Rurū no Tetsuwan Hanjōki	Compile	Compile	June 28, 1996	Unreleased	Unreleased	
Super Nichibutsu Mahjong		Nichibutsu	December 18, 1992	Unreleased	Unreleased	
Super Nichibutsu Mahjong 2: Zenkoku Seiha Hen		Nichibutsu	October 29, 1993	Unreleased	Unreleased	
Super Nichibutsu Mahjong 3: Yoshimoto Gekijō Hen		Nichibutsu	July 29, 1994	Unreleased	Unreleased	
Super Nichibutsu Mahjong 4: Kiso Kenkyū Hen		Nichibutsu	September 27, 1996	Unreleased	Unreleased	
Super Ninja Boy •Super Chinese World^{JP}	Culture Brain	Culture Brain	December 28, 1991	April 1993	Unreleased	
Super Ninja-kun •Maru's Quest^{PAL}		Jaleco	August 5, 1994	Unreleased	Cancelled	
Super Nova •Darius Force^{JP}	Taito; Act Japan	Taito	September 24, 1993	December 1993	Unreleased	
Super Off Road	Software Creations	Pack-In-Video (JP); Tradewest (NA/PAL)	July 3, 1992	December 1991	June 24, 1993	
Super Off Road: The Baja •Super 4WD: The Baja^{JP}	Leland Interactive Media	Nichibutsu (JP); Tradewest (NA)	June 17, 1994	July 1993	Unreleased	
Super Okuman Chōja Game		Takara	November 24, 1995	Unreleased	Unreleased	
Super Ōzumō: Netsusen Daiichiban	Namco	Namco	December 18, 1992	Unreleased	Unreleased	
Super Pachi-Slot Mahjong	Syscom	Nichibutsu	April 29, 1994	Unreleased	Unreleased	
Super Pachinko	Betop	I'MAX	July 29, 1994	Unreleased	Unreleased	
Super Pachinko Taisen		Banpresto	April 28, 1995	Unreleased	Unreleased	
Super Pinball: Behind the Mask	KAZe	Meldac (JP); Nintendo (NA/PAL)	January 8, 1994	May 1994	August 8, 1994	
Super Pinball II: Amazing Odyssey	KAZe	Meldac	March 17, 1995	Unreleased	Unreleased	
Super Play Action Football	Tose	Nintendo	Unreleased	August 1992	Unreleased	
Super Power League	Now Production	Hudson Soft	August 6, 1993	Unreleased	Unreleased	
Super Power League 2	Now Production	Hudson Soft	August 3, 1994	Unreleased	Unreleased	
Super Power League 3	Now Production	Hudson Soft	August 10, 1995	Unreleased	Unreleased	
Super Power League 4	Now Production	Hudson Soft	August 9, 1996	Unreleased	Unreleased	
Super Professional Baseball II	Tose	Jaleco	August 7, 1992	Unreleased	Unreleased	
Super Punch-Out!! (Note: Digital release only (Nintendo Power) in Japan)	Nintendo R&D3; Locomotive Corporation	Nintendo	March 1, 1998	October 24, 1994	February 10, 1995	
Super Putty •Putty Moon^{JP}	System 3	Varie (JP); U.S. Gold (NA); System 3 (PAL)	July 30, 1993	November 1993	1993	
Super Puyo Puyo Tsū	Compile	Compile	December 8, 1995	Unreleased	Unreleased	
Super Puyo Puyo Tsū Remix	Compile	Compile	March 8, 1996	Unreleased	Unreleased	
Super R.B.I. Baseball	Gray Matter	Time Warner Interactive	Unreleased	June 1995	Unreleased	
Super R-Type	Irem	Irem (JP/NA); Nintendo (PAL)	July 13, 1991	September 1991	June 4, 1992	
Super Real Mahjong PIV	Affect	SETA	March 25, 1994	Unreleased	Unreleased	
Super Real Mahjong PV: Paradise: All-Star 4 Nin Uchi	SETA	SETA	April 21, 1995	Unreleased	Unreleased	
Super Robot Wars EX	Winkysoft	Banpresto	March 25, 1994	Unreleased	Unreleased	
Super Robot Wars Gaiden: Masō Kishin – The Lord of Elemental	Winkysoft	Banpresto	March 22, 1996	Unreleased	Unreleased	
Super Rugby	Tose	Tonkin House	October 21, 1994	Unreleased	Unreleased	
Super Sangokushi	Koei	Koei	August 12, 1994	Unreleased	Unreleased	
Super Scope 6 •Nintendo Scope 6^{PAL}	Nintendo R&D1; Intelligent Systems	Nintendo	June 21, 1993	February 1992	August 26, 1992	
Super Shōgi		I'MAX	June 19, 1992	Unreleased	Unreleased	
Super Shōgi 2		I'MAX	June 17, 1994	Unreleased	Unreleased	
Super Shōgi 3: Kitaihei	Gaibrain	I'MAX	December 29, 1995	Unreleased	Unreleased	
Super Slam Dunk •Magic Johnson no Super Slam Dunk^{JP}	Virgin Interactive Entertainment	Virgin Interactive Entertainment	July 16, 1993	July 1993	Unreleased	
Super Slap Shot	Ringler Studios	Altron (JP); Virgin Interactive Entertainment (NA)	May 28, 1993	August 1993	Unreleased	
Super Smash TV •Smash TV^{JP}	Beam Software	ASCII Entertainment (JP); Acclaim Entertainment (NA/PAL)	March 27, 1992	February 1992	February 18, 1993	
Super Soccer •Super Formation Soccer^{JP}	Human Entertainment	Human Entertainment (JP); Nintendo (NA/PAL)	December 13, 1991	May 1992	April 11, 1992	
Super Soccer Champ •Euro Football Champ^{PAL} •Hat Trick Hero^{JP}	Taito	Taito	March 27, 1992	June 1992	1992	
Super Solitaire •Trump Island^{JP}	Beam Software	Pack-In-Video (JP); Extreme Entertainment Group (NA)	July 23, 1995	January 1994	Unreleased	
Super Sōkoban	Thinking Rabbit	Pack-In-Video	January 29, 1993	Unreleased	Unreleased	
Super Star Wars	LucasArts; Sculptured Software	JVC Musical Industries	December 18, 1992	November 1992	April 2, 1993	
Super Star Wars: The Empire Strikes Back	LucasArts; Sculptured Software	JVC Musical Industries	December 17, 1993	October 1993	February 18, 1994	
Super Star Wars: Return of the Jedi	LucasArts; Sculptured Software	JVC Musical Industries	June 23, 1995	October 1994	March 30, 1995	
Super Street Fighter II: The New Challengers	Capcom	Capcom	June 25, 1994	July 1994	December 2, 1994	
Super Strike Eagle •F-15 Super Strike Eagle^{JP}	MicroProse	MicroProse	November 26, 1993	March 1993	November 25, 1993	
Super SWIV •Firepower 2000^{NA}	Sales Curve Interactive	Coconuts Japan (JP); Sunsoft (NA); Time Warner Interactive (PAL)	November 13, 1992	November 1992	August 19, 1993	
Super Tekkyū Fight!	Metro	Banpresto	September 15, 1995	Unreleased	Unreleased	
Super Tennis •Super Tennis World Circuit^{JP}	Tose	Tonkin House (JP); Nintendo (NA/PAL)	August 30, 1991	November 1991	April 11, 1992	
Super Tetris 2 + Bombliss	Tose	Bullet-Proof Software	December 18, 1992	Unreleased	Unreleased	
Super Tetris 2 + Bombliss: Gentei-ban	Tose	Bullet-Proof Software	January 21, 1994	Unreleased	Unreleased	
Super Tetris 3	Tose	Bullet-Proof Software	December 16, 1994	Unreleased	Unreleased	
Super Troll Islands •Super Troll Island: Shiawase wo Akeru^{JP}	Millennium Interactive	Kemco (JP); American Softworks (NA/PAL)	March 25, 1994	February 1994	1994	
Super Trump Collection		Bottom Up	April 21, 1995	Unreleased	Unreleased	
Super Trump Collection 2		Bottom Up	July 19, 1996	Unreleased	Unreleased	
Super Tsume Shōgi 1000		Bottom Up	December 16, 1994	Unreleased	Unreleased	
Super Turrican	Factor 5	Tonkin House (JP); Seika Corporation (NA); Hudson Soft (PAL)	September 3, 1993	May 1993	1993	
Super Turrican 2	Factor 5	Ocean Software	Unreleased	November 1995	May 1995	
Super Ultra Baseball 2 •Super Baseball Simulator 1.000 2^{NA}		Culture Brain	July 28, 1994	Cancelled	Unreleased	
Super Uno		Tomy	November 12, 1993	Unreleased	Unreleased	
Super V.G.	TGL	TGL	July 21, 1995	Unreleased	Unreleased	
Super Valis IV •Super Valis: Red Moon Rising Maiden^{JP}	Telenet Japan	Telenet Japan (JP); Atlus (NA)	March 27, 1992	February 1993	Unreleased	
Super Wagyan Land	Nova Games	Namco	December 13, 1991	Unreleased	Unreleased	
Super Wagyan Land 2	Nova Games	Namco	March 25, 1993	Unreleased	Unreleased	
Super Widget	Atlus	Atlus	Unreleased	September 1993	1993	
Super Wrestle Angels		Imagineer	December 16, 1994	Unreleased	Unreleased	
Super Yakyū Michi	Nippon Create	Banpresto	January 26, 1996	Unreleased	Unreleased	
Super Zugan: Hakotenjō Kara no Shōtaijō		Electronic Arts Victor	February 11, 1994	Unreleased	Unreleased	
Super Zugan 2: Tsukanpo Fighter		J-Wing	December 30, 1994	Unreleased	Unreleased	
Sutobasu Yarō Shō: 3 on 3 Basketball	KID	Bandai	February 25, 1994	Unreleased	Unreleased	
Sutte Hakkun	Nintendo	Nintendo	June 25, 1999	Unreleased	Unreleased	
Suzuka 8 Hours	Arc System Works	Namco	October 15, 1993	May 1994	Unreleased	
SWAT Kats: The Radical Squadron	AIM	Hudson Soft	Unreleased	August 1995	Unreleased	
Sword World SFC		T&E Soft	August 6, 1993	Unreleased	Unreleased	
Sword World SFC 2: Inishie no Kyojin Densetsu		T&E Soft	July 15, 1994	Unreleased	Unreleased	
Syndicate	Bullfrog Productions	Electronic Arts Victor (JP); Ocean Software (NA/PAL)	May 19, 1995	December 1995	January 1995	
Syvalion •Saibarion^{JP}	Taito	Toshiba EMI (JP); JVC Musical Industries (PAL)	July 24, 1992	Cancelled	November 1992	
Table Game Daishūgō! Shōgi Mahjong Hanafuda		Varie	July 26, 1996	Unreleased	Unreleased	
Tactical Soccer	Electronic Arts Victor	Electronic Arts Victor	April 21, 1995	Unreleased	Unreleased	
Tactics Ogre: Let Us Cling Together	Quest Corporation	Quest Corporation	October 6, 1995	Unreleased	Unreleased	
Tadaima Yūsha Boshūchū Okawari	Human Entertainment	Human Entertainment	November 25, 1994	Unreleased	Unreleased	
Taekwon-Do	Human Club	Human Entertainment	June 28, 1994	Unreleased	Unreleased	
Taikō Risshiden		Koei	April 7, 1993	Unreleased	Unreleased	
Taikyoku Igo: Goliath		Bullet-Proof Software	May 14, 1993	Unreleased	Unreleased	
Taikyoku Igo: Idaten		Bullet-Proof Software	December 29, 1995	Unreleased	Unreleased	
Take Yutaka G1 Memory	Gaps	Naxat Soft	July 21, 1995	Unreleased	Unreleased	
Takeda Nobuhiro no Super League Soccer	Tose	Jaleco	November 25, 1994	Unreleased	Unreleased	
Takemiya Masaki Kudan no Igo Taishō		KSS	August 11, 1995	Unreleased	Unreleased	
Tales of Phantasia	Wolf Team	Namco	December 15, 1995	Unreleased	Unreleased	
Tamagotchi Town	Marigul Management	Bandai	May 1, 1999	Unreleased	Unreleased	
Tarot Mystery	Ukiyotei	Visit	April 28, 1995	Unreleased	Unreleased	
Taz-Mania	Visual Concepts	Sunsoft (NA); THQ (PAL)	Unreleased	May 1993	1993	
Tecmo Super Baseball	Tecmo	Tecmo	October 28, 1994	September 1994	Unreleased	
Tecmo Super Bowl	Tecmo	Tecmo	November 26, 1993	November 1993	Unreleased	
Tecmo Super Bowl II: Special Edition	Tecmo	Tecmo	December 20, 1994	January 1995	Unreleased	
Tecmo Super Bowl III: Final Edition	Tecmo	Tecmo	December 22, 1995	October 1995	Unreleased	
Tecmo Super NBA Basketball	Sculptured Software	Tecmo	December 25, 1992	March 1993	1993	
Teenage Mutant Ninja Turtles IV: Turtles in Time •Teenage Mutant Hero Turtles IV: Turtles in Time^{PAL} •Teenage Mutant Ninja Turtles: Turtles in Time^{JP}	Konami	Konami	July 24, 1992	August 15, 1992	November 19, 1992	
Teenage Mutant Ninja Turtles: Tournament Fighters •Teenage Mutant Hero Turtles: Tournament Fighters^{PAL} •Teenage Mutant Ninja Turtles: Mutant Warriors^{JP}	Konami	Konami	December 3, 1993	December 1993	December 1993	
Tekichū Keiba Juku		Banpresto	January 19, 1996	Unreleased	Unreleased	
Tenchi Muyō! Game Hen	Banpresto	Banpresto	October 27, 1995	Unreleased	Unreleased	
Tenchi o Kurau: Sangokushi Gunyūden		Capcom	August 11, 1995	Unreleased	Unreleased	
Tengai Makyō Zero	Red Company	Hudson Soft	December 22, 1995	Unreleased	Unreleased	
Tenshi no Uta: Shiroki Tsubasa no Inori		Telenet Japan	July 29, 1994	Unreleased	Unreleased	
The Terminator	Gray Matter	Mindscape	Unreleased	April 1993	1993	
T2: The Arcade Game	Probe Entertainment	Acclaim Entertainment (JP); LJN (NA/PAL)	February 25, 1994	February 1994	January 1994	
Terminator 2: Judgment Day	Bits Studios	LJN	Unreleased	November 1993	1993	
Terranigma •Tenchi Sōzō^{JP}	Quintet	Enix (JP); Nintendo (PAL)	October 20, 1995	Unreleased	December 19, 1996	
Tetris & Dr. Mario	Nintendo	Nintendo	Unreleased	December 1994	July 27, 1995	
Tetris 2 •Tetris Flash^{JP}	Tose	Bullet-Proof Software (JP); Nintendo (NA/PAL)	July 8, 1994	August 1994	1995	
Tetris Attack •Panel de Pon^{JP}	Intelligent Systems	Nintendo	October 27, 1995	August 1996	November 28, 1996	
Tetris Battle Gaiden	Bullet-Proof Software	Bullet-Proof Software	December 24, 1993	Unreleased	Unreleased	
Tetsuwan Atom	Minato Giken	Zamuse	February 18, 1994	Unreleased	Unreleased	
Theme Park	Bullfrog Productions	Electronic Arts Victor (JP); Ocean Software (PAL)	December 15, 1995	Cancelled	November 11, 1994	
Thomas the Tank Engine & Friends	Software Creations	THQ	Unreleased	September 1993	December 31, 1993	
Thoroughbred Breeder	Hect	Hect	August 25, 1993	Unreleased	Unreleased	
Thoroughbred Breeder II	Hect	Hect	June 8, 1994	Unreleased	Unreleased	
Thoroughbred Breeder III	Hect	Hect	October 18, 1996	Unreleased	Unreleased	
Thunder Spirits	Technosoft	Toshiba EMI (JP); Seika Corporation (NA)	December 27, 1991	June 1992	Unreleased	
Thunderbirds: Kokusai Kyūjotai Jūdō Seyo!	Nova Games	Cobra Team	September 10, 1993	Unreleased	Unreleased	
The Tick	Software Creations	Fox Interactive	Unreleased	December 1994	Unreleased	
Time Slip	Sales Curve Interactive	Vic Tokai	Unreleased	November 1993	1993	
Time Trax	Malibu Interactive	Malibu Games	Unreleased	April 1994	July 1994	
Timecop	Cryo Interactive	JVC Musical Industries	February 17, 1995	April 1995	1996	
Timon & Pumbaa's Jungle Games	Tiertex Design Studios	THQ	Unreleased	November 30, 1997	March 26, 1998	
Tin Star	Software Creations	Nintendo	Unreleased	November 1994	Unreleased	
Tintin in Tibet	Infogrames	Infogrames	Unreleased	Unreleased	December 14, 1995	
Tiny Toon Adventures: Buster Busts Loose! •Tiny Toon Adventures^{JP}	Konami	Konami	December 18, 1992	February 1993	June 24, 1993	
Tiny Toon Adventures: Wacky Sports Challenge •Tiny Toon Adventures: Wild & Wacky Sports^{PAL} •Tiny Toon Adventures: Dotabata Daiundōkai^{JP}	Konami	Konami	September 30, 1994	December 1994	April 25, 1994	
TKO Super Championship Boxing •Kentō-Ō World Champion^{JP}	Sting Entertainment	SOFEL	April 28, 1992	October 1992	1993	
TNN Bass Tournament of Champions •Larry Nixon's Super Bass Fishing^{JP}	Gaps	King Records (JP); American Softworks (NA)	September 22, 1994	November 1994	Unreleased	
Todd McFarlane's Spawn: The Video Game	Ukiyotei	Acclaim Entertainment	Unreleased	October 1995	Unreleased	
Tokimeki Memorial: Densetsu no Ki no Shita de	Konami	Konami	February 9, 1996	Unreleased	Unreleased	
Tokoro's Mahjong	Syscom	Vic Tokai	September 23, 1994	Unreleased	Unreleased	
Tom and Jerry	Riedel Software Productions	Altron (JP); Hi Tech Expressions (NA/PAL)	June 25, 1993	April 1993	1993	
Tommy Moe's Winter Extreme: Skiing & Snowboarding •Val d'Isere Championship^{PAL} •Ski Paradise with Snowboard^{JP}	Loriciel	Pack-In-Video (JP); Electro Brain (NA); Mindscape (PAL)	December 16, 1994	June 1994	April 28, 1994	
Tony Meola's Sidekicks Soccer •Super Copa^{BR} •World Soccer^{PAL} •Ramos Ruy no World Wide Soccer^{JP}	Sculptured Software	Pack-In-Video (JP); Electro Brain (NA)	February 25, 1994	November 1993	Cancelled	
Top Gear •Top Racer^{JP}	Gremlin Interactive	Kemco	March 27, 1992	April 1992	November 19, 1992	
Top Gear 2 •Top Racer 2^{JP}	Gremlin Interactive	Kemco	December 22, 1993	August 1993	1993	
Top Gear 3000 •The Planet's Champ TG3000^{JP}	Gremlin Interactive	Kemco (JP/NA); Gremlin Interactive (PAL)	April 28, 1995	February 1995	1995	
Top Management II		Koei	February 11, 1994	Unreleased	Unreleased	
Toride	Metro	Takara	December 9, 1994	Unreleased	Unreleased	
Torneko no Daibōken: Fushigi no Dungeon •Mystery Dungeon: Taloon's Great Adventure^{PAL}	Chunsoft	Chunsoft	September 19, 1993	Unreleased	Cancelled	
Total Carnage	Black Pearl Software	Malibu Games	Unreleased	November 1993	1993	
Tottemo! Luckyman: Lucky Cookie Roulette Assault!!		Bandai	June 30, 1995	Unreleased	Unreleased	
Tōge Densetsu: Saisoku Battle	Lenar	Bullet-Proof Software	March 15, 1996	Unreleased	Unreleased	
Tower Dream	C-Lab	ASCII Entertainment	October 25, 1996	Unreleased	Unreleased	
Toy Story	Traveller's Tales	Capcom (JP); Disney Interactive (NA); Nintendo (PAL)	April 26, 1996	December 1995	April 25, 1996	
Toys	Imagineering	Absolute Entertainment	Unreleased	April 1993	1993	
Traverse: Starlight & Prairie	Pandora Box	Banpresto	June 28, 1996	Unreleased	Unreleased	
Treasure Hunter G	Sting Entertainment	Square	May 24, 1996	Unreleased	Unreleased	
Trinea	Japan Art Media	Yanoman	October 1, 1993	Unreleased	Unreleased	
Troddlers	Atod	Seika Corporation (NA); Storm (PAL)	Unreleased	October 1993	1993	
Troy Aikman NFL Football	Leland Interactive Media	Tradewest	Unreleased	August 1994	Unreleased	
True Golf Classics: Wicked 18 •Devil's Course^{JP}	T&E Soft	T&E Soft (JP); Bullet-Proof Software (NA)	March 5, 1993	October 1993	Unreleased	
True Golf Classics: Pebble Beach Golf Links •Pebble Beach no Hatō^{JP}	T&E Soft	T&E Soft	April 10, 1992	April 1992	1992	
True Golf Classics: Waialae Country Club •New 3D Golf Simulation: Waialae no Kiseki^{JP}	T&E Soft	T&E Soft	September 18, 1992	November 1991	Unreleased	
True Lies	Beam Software	Acclaim Entertainment (JP); LJN (NA/PAL)	April 28, 1995	February 1995	June 29, 1995	
Tsukikomori	Pandora Box	Banpresto	March 1, 1996	Unreleased	Unreleased	
Tsuppari Ōzumō: Risshin Shusse Hen	Tecmo	Tecmo	March 26, 1993	Unreleased	Unreleased	
Tsuri Tarō		Pack-In-Video	July 8, 1994	Unreleased	Unreleased	
Tsuyoshi Shikkari Shinasai: Taisen Puzzle-dama		Konami	November 18, 1994	Unreleased	Unreleased	
Tuff E Nuff •Dead Dance^{JP}	Jaleco	Jaleco	March 26, 1993	September 1993	1993	
Turf Hero		Tecmo	March 21, 1995	Unreleased	Unreleased	
Turf Memories		BEC	February 24, 1995	Unreleased	Unreleased	
Turn and Burn: No-Fly Zone •Super Dogfight^{JP}	Absolute Entertainment	Absolute Entertainment	June 24, 1994	February 1994	August 8, 1994	
The Twisted Tales of Spike McFang •Chō Makai Taisen!: Dorabocchan^{JP}	Red Company	Naxat Soft (JP); Bullet-Proof Software (NA)	March 19, 1993	June 1994	Unreleased	
U.N. Squadron •Area 88^{JP}	Capcom	Capcom	July 26, 1991	September 1991	December 1992	
Uchū no Kishi: Tekkaman Blade	A.I. Company Ltd.	BEC	July 30, 1993	Unreleased	Unreleased	
Uchū Race: Astro Go! Go! •Freeway Flyboys^{NA}	KAZe	Meldac	February 25, 1994	Cancelled	Unreleased	
UFO Kamen Yakisoban: Kettler no Kuroi Inbō	KID	Den'Z	October 14, 1994	Unreleased	Unreleased	
Ugoku E Ver. 2.0: Aryol		Altron	August 5, 1994	Unreleased	Unreleased	
Ultima: Kyōryū Teikoku	Origin Systems	Pony Canyon	July 28, 1995	Unreleased	Unreleased	
Ultima: Runes of Virtue II •Ultima Gaiden: Kuro Kishi no Inbou^{JP}	Origin Systems	FCI	June 17, 1994	November 1994	Unreleased	
Ultima VI: The False Prophet	Infinity Co., Ltd	FCI	April 3, 1992	April 1994	Unreleased	
Ultima VII: The Black Gate	Origin Systems	FCI	November 18, 1994	November 1994	Unreleased	
Ultimate Fighter •Hiryū no Ken S: Golden Fighter^{JP}	Culture Brain	Culture Brain	July 31, 1992	June 1994	Unreleased	
Ultimate Mortal Kombat 3	Avalanche Software	Williams Entertainment (NA); Acclaim Entertainment (PAL)	Unreleased	October 11, 1996	November 28, 1996	
Ultra Baseball Jitsumeiban	Culture Brain	Culture Brain	August 28, 1992	Unreleased	Unreleased	
Ultra Baseball Jitsumeiban 2	Culture Brain	Culture Brain	January 3, 1995	Unreleased	Unreleased	
Ultra Baseball Jitsumeiban 3	Culture Brain	Culture Brain	October 27, 1995	Unreleased	Unreleased	
Ultra League: Moero! Soccer Daikessen!!	Tom Create	Yutaka	July 28, 1995	Unreleased	Unreleased	
Ultra Seven	BEC	Bandai	March 26, 1993	Unreleased	Unreleased	
Ultraman: Towards the Future •Ultraman ^{JP}	Nova Games	Bandai	April 6, 1991	October 1991	1992	
Umi no Nushi Tsuri		Pack-In-Video	July 19, 1996	Unreleased	Unreleased	
Umizuri Meijin: Suzuki Hen	A-Wave	Electronic Arts Victor	December 16, 1994	Unreleased	Unreleased	
Umihara Kawase		TNN	December 23, 1994	Unreleased	Unreleased	
Uncharted Waters •Super Daikōkai Jidai^{JP}	Koei	Koei	August 5, 1992	January 1993	Unreleased	
Uncharted Waters: New Horizons •Daikōkai Jidai II^{JP}	Koei	Koei	February 25, 1994	October 1994	Unreleased	
Undercover Cops		Varie	March 9, 1995	Cancelled	Unreleased	
Uniracers •Unirally^{PAL}	DMA Design	Nintendo	Unreleased	December 1994	April 27, 1995	
The Untouchables	Ocean Software	Ocean Software	Unreleased	August 1994	Unreleased	
Urban Strike	Granite Bay Software	Black Pearl Software (NA); THQ (PAL)	Unreleased	November 1995	1995	
Ushio to Tora		Yutaka	January 22, 1993	Unreleased	Unreleased	
Utopia: The Creation of a Nation	Jaleco	Jaleco	October 29, 1993	September 1993	August 1994	
Vegas Stakes •Las Vegas Dream^{JP}	HAL Laboratory	Imagineer (JP); Nintendo (NA/PAL)	September 10, 1993	April 1993	1993	
Venom/Spider-Man: Separation Anxiety	Software Creations	Acclaim Entertainment	Unreleased	November 1995	1995	
Verne World	Dual	Banpresto	September 29, 1995	Unreleased	Unreleased	
Virtual Bart	Sculptured Software	Acclaim Entertainment	September 30, 1994	September 1994	1994	
Virtual Soccer •J.League Super Soccer^{JP}	Probe Entertainment	Hudson Soft	March 18, 1994	Unreleased	1994	
Vortex •Vortex: The FX Robot Battle^{JP}	Argonaut Software	Pack-In-Video (JP); Electro Brain (NA); Sony Imagesoft (PAL)	December 9, 1994	September 1994	December 1994	
VS. Collection	Bottom Up	Bottom Up	November 29, 1996	Unreleased	Unreleased	
Wagyan Paradise	Namco	Namco	December 16, 1994	Unreleased	Unreleased	
Waka Taka Ōzumō: Brothers Dream Match	Tomcat System	Imagineer	November 12, 1993	Unreleased	Unreleased	
Waku Waku Ski Wonder Spur	Human Club	Human Entertainment	January 13, 1995	Unreleased	Unreleased	
Wally wo Sagase!	Natsu System	Tomy	February 19, 1993	Unreleased	Unreleased	
War 2410	Advanced Productions	Advanced Productions	Unreleased	December 1995	Unreleased	
War 3010: The Revolution	Advanced Productions	Advanced Productions	Unreleased	October 1996	Unreleased	
Waratte Iitomo! Tamorinpic	Athena	Athena	April 28, 1994	Unreleased	Unreleased	
Wario's Woods	Nintendo; Intelligent Systems	Nintendo	Unreleased	December 1994	1995	
Warlock	Realtime Associates	Acclaim Entertainment (JP); LJN (NA/PAL)	May 26, 1995	March 1995	1994	
WarpSpeed	Accolade	Ballistic	Unreleased	December 1992	1992	
Waterworld	Ocean Software	Ocean Software	Unreleased	Cancelled	1995	
Wayne Gretzky and the NHLPA All-Stars	Time Warner Interactive	Time Warner Interactive	Unreleased	December 1995	Unreleased	
Wayne's World	Gray Matter	THQ	Unreleased	April 1993	1993	
WCW SuperBrawl Wrestling	Beam Software	FCI	Unreleased	November 1994	Unreleased	
WeaponLord	Visual Concepts	Namco (NA); Ocean Software (PAL)	Unreleased	September 1995	1995	
Wedding Peach	Shimada Kikaku	KSS	September 29, 1995	Unreleased	Unreleased	
We're Back! A Dinosaur's Story	Visual Concepts	Hi Tech Expressions	Unreleased	November 1993	1993	
Wheel of Fortune: Featuring Vanna White	Imagitec Design	GameTek	Unreleased	September 1992	Unreleased	
Wheel of Fortune Deluxe!	Imagitec Design	GameTek	Unreleased	April 1994	Unreleased	
Where in the World Is Carmen Sandiego?	EA Canada	Hi Tech Expressions	Unreleased	June 1993	October 1993	
Where in Time Is Carmen Sandiego?	EA Canada	Hi Tech Expressions	Unreleased	May 1993	Unreleased	
Whirlo •Xandra no Daibōken: Valkyrie to no Deai^{JP}	Nova Games	Namco	July 23, 1992	Unreleased	1992	
Whizz	Flair Software	Titus Software	Unreleased	November 1996	1997	
Wild Guns	Natsume Co., Ltd.	Natsume Co., Ltd.	August 12, 1994	July 1995	October 31, 1996	
WildSnake •Super Snakey^{JP}	Manley & Associates	Yojigen (JP); Spectrum HoloByte (NA)	December 23, 1994	September 1994	Unreleased	
Williams Arcade's Greatest Hits	Digital Eclipse Software	Williams Entertainment (NA); THQ (PAL)	Unreleased	October 1996	January 8, 1997	
Wing Commander	Origin Systems	ASCII Entertainment (JP); Mindscape (NA/PAL)	July 23, 1993	November 1992	1993	
Wing Commander: The Secret Missions	Origin Systems	Mindscape	Unreleased	September 1993	October 1993	
Wings 2: Aces High •Blazing Skies^{PAL} •Sky Mission^{JP}	Malibu Interactive	Namco	September 29, 1992	October 1992	January 21, 1993	
Winning Post	Koei	Koei	September 10, 1993	Unreleased	Unreleased	
Winning Post 2	Koei	Koei	March 18, 1995	Unreleased	Unreleased	
Winning Post 2: Program '96	Koei	Koei	October 5, 1996	Unreleased	Unreleased	
Winter Gold	Funcom	Nintendo	Unreleased	Unreleased	November 28, 1996	
Winter Olympic Games: Lillehammer '94	U.S. Gold	U.S. Gold	Unreleased	February 1994	February 24, 1994	
Wizap!: Ankoku no Ō	Pop House; SAS Sakata	ASCII Entertainment	September 22, 1994	Unreleased	Unreleased	
The Wizard of Oz	Manley & Associates	SETA	Unreleased	October 1993	Unreleased	
Wizardry Gaiden IV: Throb of the Demon's Heart	Access	ASCII Entertainment	September 20, 1996	Unreleased	Unreleased	
Wizardry I-II-III: Story of Llylgamyn	Gung-Ho!	Media Factory	June 1, 1999	Unreleased	Unreleased	
Wizardry V: Heart of the Maelstrom •Wizardry V: Saika no Chūshin^{JP}	ASCII Entertainment	ASCII Entertainment (JP); Capcom (NA)	November 20, 1992	April 1994	Unreleased	
Wizardry VI: Bane of the Cosmic Forge	Game Studio	ASCII Entertainment	September 29, 1995	Unreleased	Unreleased	
Wolfchild	Core Design	Virgin Interactive Entertainment	Unreleased	June 1993	Unreleased	
Wolfenstein 3D •Wolfenstein 3D: The Claw of Eisenfaust^{JP}	Imagineer	Imagineer	February 10, 1994	March 1994	1994	
Wolverine: Adamantium Rage	Bits Studios	Acclaim Entertainment (JP); LJN (NA/PAL)	January 27, 1995	November 1994	December 1994	
Wonder Project J: Kikai no Shōnen Pīno	Almanic	Enix	December 9, 1994	Unreleased	Unreleased	
Wondrous Magic	System Sacom	ASCII Entertainment	December 17, 1993	Unreleased	Unreleased	
Wordtris	Bullet-Proof Software	Spectrum HoloByte	Unreleased	November 1992	Unreleased	
World Class Rugby	Audiogenic	Imagineer	January 29, 1993	Unreleased	1993	
World Class Rugby 2: Kokunai Gekitō Hen '93	Denton Designs	Misawa	January 7, 1994	Unreleased	Unreleased	
World Cup Striker •Elite Soccer^{NA}	Rage Software; Elite Systems	Coconuts Japan (JP); GameTek (NA); Elite Systems (PAL)	June 17, 1994	August 1994	July 15, 1994	
World Cup USA '94	U.S. Gold	Sunsoft (JP); U.S. Gold (NA/PAL)	July 29, 1994	June 1994	May 26, 1994	
World Heroes	Sunsoft	Sunsoft	August 12, 1993	September 1993	1993	
World Heroes 2	Saurus Co., Ltd	Takara	July 1, 1994	September 1994	Unreleased	
World League Soccer •Pro Soccer^{JP}	C-Lab	Imagineer (JP); Mindscape (NA)	September 20, 1991	April 1992	Unreleased	
World Masters Golf	Arc Developments	Virgin Interactive Entertainment	Unreleased	Unreleased	November 23, 1995	
Worms	Team17	Ocean Software	Unreleased	Unreleased	September 27, 1996	
Wrecking Crew '98	Nintendo R&D1; Pax Softonica	Nintendo	May 23, 1998	Unreleased	Unreleased	
WWF RAW	Sculptured Software	LJN	Unreleased	November 1994	December 1994	
WWF Royal Rumble	Sculptured Software	Acclaim Entertainment (JP); LJN (NA/PAL)	July 23, 1993	June 1993	1993	
WWF Super WrestleMania	Sculptured Software	Acclaim Entertainment (JP/PAL); LJN (NA)	April 24, 1992	March 1992	1992	
WWF WrestleMania: The Arcade Game	Sculptured Software	Acclaim Entertainment	March 1, 1996	November 1995	January 25, 1996	
Xak: The Art of Visual Stage	Micro Cabin	Sunsoft	February 26, 1993	Unreleased	Unreleased	
Xardion •Chōkō Gasshin Sādion^{JP}	Asmik Ace Entertainment	Asmik Ace Entertainment	March 20, 1992	April 1992	Unreleased	
X-Kaliber 2097 •Sword Maniac^{JP}	Fupac; Winds	Toshiba EMI (JP); Activision (NA); Sony Imagesoft (PAL)	February 11, 1994	February 1994	December 1994	
X-Men: Mutant Apocalypse	Capcom	Capcom	January 3, 1995	November 1994	1995	
X-Zone	Kemco	Kemco	August 27, 1993	November 1992	1993	
Yadamon: Wonderland Dream	Sting Entertainment	Tokuma Shoten	November 26, 1993	Unreleased	Unreleased	
Yakōchū	Athena	Athena	June 16, 1995	Unreleased	Unreleased	
Yamato Takeru	Multimedia Intelligence Transfer	Toho	September 29, 1995	Unreleased	Unreleased	
YamYam	Pandora Box	Bandai	February 17, 1995	Unreleased	Unreleased	
Yokoyama Mitsuteru: Sangokushi	Tose	Angel	June 26, 1992	Unreleased	Unreleased	
Yokoyama Mitsuteru: Sangokushi 2	Tose	Angel	December 29, 1993	Unreleased	Unreleased	
Yokoyama Mitsuteru: Sangokushi Bangi: Sugoroku Eiyūki	Tose	Angel	December 22, 1994	Unreleased	Unreleased	
Yoshi's Cookie •Yoshi no Cookie^{JP}	Bullet-Proof Software	Bullet-Proof Software	July 9, 1993	April 1993	1993	
Yoshi's Safari •Yoshi's Road Hunting^{JP}	Nintendo R&D1	Nintendo	July 14, 1993	September 1993	1993	
Yōchien Senki Madara	Nexus Interact	Datam Polystar	January 26, 1996	Unreleased	Unreleased	
Young Merlin	Westwood Studios	Virgin Interactive Entertainment	Unreleased	March 1994	1994	
Ys III: Wanderers from Ys	Advance Communication Company	Tonkin House (JP); American Sammy (NA)	June 21, 1991	January 1992	Unreleased	
Ys IV: Mask of the Sun	Tonkin House	Tonkin House	November 19, 1993	Unreleased	Unreleased	
Ys V: Lost Kefin, Kingdom of Sand	Nihon Falcom	Nihon Falcom	December 29, 1995	Unreleased	Unreleased	
Yū Yū Hakusho	Namco	Namco	December 22, 1993	Unreleased	Unreleased	
Yū Yū Hakusho 2: Kakutō no Sho	Namco	Namco	June 10, 1994	Unreleased	Unreleased	
Yū Yū Hakusho Final: Makai Saikyō Retsuden	Namco	Namco	March 24, 1995	Unreleased	Unreleased	
Yū Yū Hakusho: Tokubetsu-hen	Namco	Namco	December 22, 1994	Unreleased	Unreleased	
Yume Maboroshi no Gotoku	Tose	Intec	December 17, 1993	Unreleased	Unreleased	
Yume Meikyū: Kigurumi Daibōken	Axes Art Amuse	Hect	April 15, 1994	Unreleased	Unreleased	
Yūjin: Janjū Gakuen	Varie	Varie	November 19, 1993	Unreleased	Unreleased	
Yūjin: Janjū Gakuen 2	Varie	Varie	November 18, 1994	Unreleased	Unreleased	
Yūjin no Furi Furi Girls	U-Jin	Planning Office Wada	July 1, 1994	Unreleased	Unreleased	
Yūyu no Quiz de GO! GO!	Taito	Taito	July 10, 1992	Unreleased	Unreleased	
Zakuro no Aji	Imagineer	Imagineer	December 22, 1995	Unreleased	Unreleased	
Zan II: Spirits	Wolf Team	Telenet Japan	May 29, 1992	Unreleased	Unreleased	
Zan III Spirits	Wolf Team	Wolf Team	March 11, 1994	Unreleased	Unreleased	
Zenkoku Jūdan: Ultra Shinri Game	Ukiyotei	Visit	November 10, 1995	Unreleased	Unreleased	
Zenkoku Kōkō Soccer	Affect	Yojigen	November 25, 1994	Unreleased	Unreleased	
Zenkoku Kōkō Soccer 2	Nihon Syscom	Yojigen	November 17, 1995	Unreleased	Unreleased	
Zenkoku Kōkō Soccer Senshuken '96	Magical Company	Magical Company	March 22, 1996	Unreleased	Unreleased	
Zen-Nippon Pro Wrestling	Natsume Co., Ltd.	Masaya	July 16, 1993	Unreleased	Unreleased	
Zen-Nippon Pro Wrestling: Fight da Pon!	Natsume Co., Ltd.	Masaya	June 24, 1994	Unreleased	Unreleased	
Zen-Nippon Pro Wrestling 2: 3–4 Budōkan	Natsume Co., Ltd.	Masaya	April 7, 1995	Unreleased	Unreleased	
Zero the Kamikaze Squirrel	Iguana Entertainment	Sunsoft	Unreleased	November 1, 1994	March 30, 1995	
Zero4 Champ RR	Media Rings	Media Rings	July 22, 1994	Unreleased	Unreleased	
Zero4 Champ RR-Z	Media Rings	Media Rings	November 25, 1995	Unreleased	Unreleased	
Zico Soccer	Electronic Arts Victor	Electronic Arts Victor	March 4, 1994	Unreleased	Unreleased	
Zig Zag Cat: Dachō Club mo Ōsawagi da	Opera House	Den'Z	June 24, 1994	Unreleased	Unreleased	
Zoku: The Legend of Bishin	Magifact	Magifact	December 25, 1993	Unreleased	Unreleased	
Zombies Ate My Neighbors •Zombies^{PAL}	LucasArts	Konami	Unreleased	September 1993	October 4, 1993	
Zoo-tto Mahjong!	Nintendo	Nintendo	July 1, 1998	Unreleased	Unreleased	
Zool: Ninja of the "Nth" Dimension •Zool no Yume Bōken^{JP}	Gremlin Interactive	Infocom (JP); GameTek (NA); Gremlin Interactive (PAL)	July 29, 1994	January 1994	1994	
Zoop	Hookstone	Viacom New Media	Unreleased	September 1995	1995	

== Limited Editions/Promotional Giveaways ==
These non-retail releases were not available for purchase and were given away in limited numbers. The games included in this list differ from their retail counterparts.

Title	Developer(s)	Promoter	Date	Notes
From TV Animation Slam Dunk: Dream Team Shueisha Limited	Bandai	Shueisha	June 20, 1994	This is a prize version of the retail game From TV Animation Slam Dunk: Yonkyo Taiketsu!!. It differs from the retail release featuring all-star teams, however the story mode was removed. It was given away through the shōnen manga comic Weekly Shōnen Jump.
JR West Presents Super Momotarō Dentetsu DX	Hudson Soft	West Japan Railway Company	1996	This version was given away by the railway company JR West. The starting point is Osaka instead of Tokyo.
Kunio-kun no Dodgeball da yo Zen'in Shūgō Tournament Special	Technōs Japan	Technōs Japan	1993	This version has no single player mode, it only supports 2 players. Technōs Japan held several tournaments and the winners received the game as a gold cartridge trophy.
Lethal Enforcers Release Commemoration: Famicom Tsūshin Special Edition	Konami	Famicom Tsūshin	February 25, 1994	In issue 254 of Famicom Tsūshin magazine, the editors ran a giveaway for a unique Mega CD version of Lethal Enforcers. Later, in issue 271, they announced a second giveaway for a Super Famicom edition. This Super Famicom release replaced the game's in-game characters with eight magazine editors in costumes, and added a training mode featuring illustrations by manga artists.
Magical Drop 2 Bunka Housō Special Version	Data East	JOQR	1996	This version was linked with the Japanese radio program Terumi Yoshida Yaoruki No Mama! It includes a team of the JOQR Japanese radio station, including the radio presenter Terumi Yoshida.
Motoko-chan no Wonder Kitchen	Ajinomoto	Ajinomoto	September 1, 1993	This game was given away through a mail-in contest.
Pachinko Tetsujin: Shichiban Shōbu	Graphic Research	Daikoku Denki	July 7, 1995	This was given away as a Pachinko prize.
Super Bomberman 2 Taikenban	Hudson Soft	Shogakukan	1994	A gold cartridge given as a prize for a Hi-Ten Bomberman tournament at a Hudson All-Japan Caravan Festival.
Super Bomberman 5 CoroCoro Comic	Hudson Soft	Shogakukan	1997	A gold cartridge given away through the kodomo manga comic CoroCoro Comic.
Super Formation Soccer 95: della Serie A: UCC Xaqua	Human Entertainment	UCC/Roberto Baggio	1995	This was given away through a competition where participants entered via mail. The version features the 1993 FIFA World Player of the Year Roberto Baggio, and Xaqua sports drink branding.
Super Tetris 2 + Bombliss: Gentei-ban	Tose	Bullet-Proof Software	January 21, 1994	This limited edition has a contest mode with 60 new levels, a puzzle mode with 150 new puzzles, new music, jingles and background graphics. It was later re-released in 1997 for general sale.
Tengai Makyō Zero: Shōnen Jump no Shō	Red Company	Shueisha	1995	This was given away through the shōnen manga comic Weekly Shōnen Jump.
UFO Kamen Yakisoban: Kettler no Kuroi Inbō - Keihin Ban	KID	Nissin Foods	1994	This is the original version for which Nissin ran a draw allowing buyers of their Yakisoba UFO cup noodles to win a copy of the game. It was later released for general sale with some changes. This version includes in-game Nissin branding and a congratulatory message. The box art includes photos of actors of the TV series rather than illustrations.
UNDAKE 30 Shark Turtle Operation: Mario Version	Hudson Soft	Hudson Soft	1995	This was originally planned for retail; however, its release was postponed before being cancelled and was then used as prize for a high-score contest. Also released digitally for the Satellaview.
Yoshi no Cookie: Kuruppon Oven de Cookie	Bullet-Proof Software	National	1994	This was given away as a contest prize to promote National's NE-KC77 microwave oven.

== Championship games ==
Title	Developer(s)	Release date
Donkey Kong Country: Blockbuster World Video Game Championship II	Rare	November 25, 1994
Nintendo Campus Challenge 1992	Nintendo	1992
Nintendo PowerFest '94	Nintendo	1994
Star Fox: Super Weekend •Starwing Competition^{PAL}	Nintendo EAD; Argonaut Software	1993

== Other non-retail releases ==
Title	Developer	Release date		Notes
Title	Developer	Japan	North America	Notes
JRA PAT	NTT	1996	Unreleased	
JRA PAT: Wide Baken Taiyō	NTT	1999	Unreleased	
Laser Birdie: Get in the Hole	Ricoh	1995	Unreleased	
Multi-purpose Arcade Combat Simulator	Sculptured Software	Unreleased	1993	Rifle simulation developed exclusively for the U.S. Army as a training program for soldiers.
Zaitaku Tōhyō Shisutemu Urawa Funabashi Ōi Kawasaki SPAT4 Cassette	NTT	Unknown	Unreleased	
Zaitaku Tōhyō Shisutemu SPAT4 Wide	NTT	Unknown	Unreleased	

== Aftermarket licensed games ==
These games received aftermarket official releases licensed by Nintendo, but were not released during the console's lifespan. They can be considered Super NES games as they were developed for the console and consist of code assembled for this hardware. They have since been distributed in their original Super NES format to be played on other platforms through emulation authorised by Nintendo. This list does not include aftermarket licensed Super Famicom games for western regions left in Japanese language without being localised, nor does it include enhanced versions.

Title	Developer(s)	Platform	Release date		Notes
Title	Developer(s)	Platform	Japan	NA/PAL region	Notes
Assault Suits Valken Declassified	NCS Corp	Nintendo Switch (eShop)	—N/a	March 30, 2023	The Cybernator release from 1993 was censored in western regions. This re-release is taken from the original Japanese version, retranslated into English without censorship.
Magical Drop II	Data East	Nintendo Switch (Classics)	—N/a	May 26, 2021	A previously unreleased English localisation from 1996. Not to be confused with the English localisation of the game found in the Data East Classics Collection cartridge released in 2018 for the Super NES.
River City Girls Zero	Almanic	Nintendo Switch (eShop)	—N/a	February 14, 2022	An English localisation of Shin Nekketsu Kōha: Kunio-tachi no Banka developed by WayForward and Arc System Works. Also released later for PlayStation 4, PlayStation 5, Windows, Xbox One and Xbox Series X/S on September 21, 2022.
Star Fox 2	Nintendo EAD; Argonaut Software	Super Nintendo Entertainment System Classic Edition	October 5, 2017	September 29, 2017	The development of this game was practically completed in 1995 but it was cancelled. Also released later on Nintendo Classics in 2019.
Trials of Mana	Square	Nintendo Switch (Game Card/eShop)	—N/a	November 6, 2019	A North American release had been planned during the console's lifespan but was cancelled due to bugs that they deemed impossible to fix in a timely manner. Released as part of Collection of Mana.

== Unlicensed games ==
For cancelled games see List of cancelled Super NES games. Only two of the unlicensed games were released during the console's lifespan. The others were produced much later.

Title(s)	Developer	Publisher	Release date	Regions released
16-Bit Xmas 2011	RetroUSB	RetroUSB	2011	NA, PAL
Apocalypse II	Psygnosis	Piko Interactive	May 22, 2015	NA, PAL
AstroHawk	Paul Lay	Piko Interactive	2013	NA, PAL
Classic Kong	Bubble Zap Games	Piko Interactive	January 11, 2014	NA, PAL
Corn Buster	Engine Software	Piko Interactive	August 6, 2015	NA, PAL
Cotton 100%	Success	Strictly Limited Games	February 2022	NA, PAL
Creepy Bird	Piko Interactive	Piko Interactive	March 17, 2014	NA, PAL
Data East Classic Collection	Kool Brands	Retro-Bit	December 15, 2017	NA, PAL
Dorke and Ymp	Norse	Piko Interactive	August 6, 2015	NA, PAL
Dorven Digger	Mega Cat Studios	Mega Cat Studios	2021	NA
Earthworm Jim 1+2 (25th Anniversary Edition)	IAM8BIT	IAM8BIT	2020	NA
Fork Parker's Crunch Out	Mega Cat Studios	Devolver Digital	2019	NA
Gourmet Warriors •Gurume Sentai Barayarō^{JP}	Fupac, Winds	Piko Interactive	April 15, 2019	NA, PAL
Hind Strike	Bubble Zap Games	Piko Interactive	August 6, 2015	NA, PAL
Hong Kong 97	HappySoft	HappySoft	1995	JP
The Humans	Imagitec Design	Piko Interactive	May 2018	NA
Iron Commando •Iron Commando: Kōtetsu no Senshi^{JP}	Arcade Zone	Piko Interactive	January 30, 2017; October 29, 2017 (re-release in Japan)	NA, PAL, JP
Jaleco Brawler's Pack	Kool Brands	Retro-Bit	December 15, 2017	NA, PAL
Jim Power: The Lost Dimension	Loriciel	Piko Interactive	2017	NA, PAL
Joe & Mac: Ultimate Caveman Collection	Kool Brands	Retro-Bit	December 15, 2017	NA, PAL
Kaizō Chōjin Schbibinman Zero	Masaya	Columbus Circle	June 30, 2017	JP
Legend (re-release)	Arcade Zone	Piko Interactive	January 30, 2017	NA, PAL
The Lion King - Legacy Cartridge Collection	IAM8BIT	IAM8BIT	2021	NA
Little Medusa	Alekmaul	Mega Cat Studios	August 7, 2018	NA, PAL
Majyūō	Prism Kikaku Ltd.	Columbus Circle	May 24, 2018	JP
Mazezam Challenge	Mega Cat Studios	Mega Cat Studios	2013	NA, PAL
Mega Man X: 30th Anniversary Edition	IAM8BIT	IAM8BIT	2018	NA
Mr. Bloopy Saves the World	Compedia	Piko Interactive	2014	NA, PAL
Mr. Tuff	Sales Curve Interactive	The Retro Room	2023	NA, PAL
Nightmare Busters	Arcade Zone	Super Fighter Team	December 23, 2013	NA, PAL
N-Warp Daisakusen	Gra	Piko Interactive	2013	NA, PAL
Old Towers	Mega Cat Studios	Mega Cat Studios	2019	NA
Pinkie	Data Design Interactive	Piko Interactive	May 2018	NA, PAL
R-Type III & Super R-Type Collector’s Edition	Tamtex/Irem	Retro-Bit	December 2018	NA
Rockfall	Paul Lay	Piko Interactive	2013	NA, PAL
Socks the Cat Rocks the Hill	Realtime Associates	Second Dimension	February 1, 2018	NA, PAL
Street Fighter II: 30th Anniversary Edition	IAM8BIT	IAM8BIT	2017	NA
Super 3D Noah's Ark	Wisdom Tree	Wisdom Tree; Piko Interactive (reprint)	1994; December 31, 2013 (re-release)	NA
Super 4 in 1 Multicart		Piko Interactive	December 14, 2013	NA
Super Thor Quest	Bubble Zap Games	Piko Interactive	2014	NA, PAL
Super Turrican 1 Director's Cut	Factor 5	Strictly Limited Games	2022 Q1	NA, PAL
Super Turrican 2 Special Edition	Factor 5	Strictly Limited Games	2022 Q1	NA, PAL
Sydney Hunter and the Caverns of Death	Collectorvision	Collectorvision	2017	NA, PAL
Tinhead	Microprose	Piko Interactive	April 15, 2019	NA, PAL, JP
Undercover Cops Collector's Edition	Irem	Retro-Bit	2021 Summer/Autumn	NA, PAL
Unholy Night: The Darkness Hunter	Foxbat Corporation, Nu-Gaia	Blazepro (JP); Retroism (NA); JoshProd (PAL)	July 10, 2017	NA, PAL, JP
UWOL: Quest for Money	The Mojon Twins	Piko Interactive	2013	NA, PAL
Wild Guns	Natsume Atari	Strictly Limited Games	2022 Q1/Q2	NA, PAL

== Non-game software ==
Title(s)	Developer	Publisher	Japanese release date
X-Terminator 2 Sasuke	GameTech	GameTech	January 1, 1994
RPG Tsukūru: Super Dante	Success; Kūsōkagaku	ASCII Entertainment	March 31, 1995
RPG Tsukūru 2	Success; Kūsōkagaku	ASCII Entertainment	January 31, 1996

== See also ==
- List of Satellaview broadcasts
- List of Nintendo Power games
- List of SuFami Turbo games
