= Information Global Service =

Japanese video game publisher and developer

Information Global Service (IGS)
- Industry: Video games
- Founded: 1990
- Defunct: 1995
- Headquarters: Tokyo, Japan
- Subsidiaries: Information Global Services Inc.

Information Global Service (IGS) was a Japanese video game publisher and developer that was active mostly during the early 1990s. The company also operated a U.S. division named Information Global Services Inc. in Pasadena, California.

== Games ==
=== Game Boy ===
- Astro Rabby
- Vattle Giuce
- World Beach Volley: 1991 GB Cup (Sequel to World Beach Volley. Published by IGS in Japan, published by Taito in Europe, US version titled Beach Volley was to be published by Taito but it was cancelled)
- J-League Fighting Soccer
- Armadillo Gaiden (unreleased, became Ultraman Ball)
- Ultraman Ball

=== Famicom/NES ===
- Armadillo (developed by AIM)
- Armadillo 2 (unreleased)
- Battle Stadium: Senbatsu Pro Yakyuu
- J-League Fighting Soccer
- Puzznic (published by Taito internationally, port of an arcade game by Taito)
- Robocco Wars
- Seiryaku Simulation: Inbou no Wakusei: Shancara
- Super Mogura Tataki!! Pokkun Mogura (requires peripheral)
- Shounen Majutsushi Indy (unreleased)

=== Mega Drive ===
- Dahna: Megami Tanjō

=== Super Famicom/SNES ===
- The Rocketeer (developed by NovaLogic)
- Naki no Ryū: Mahjong Hishō-den
- Aliens vs. Predator (developed by Jorudan, published by Activision internationally)
- Burai: Hachigyoku no Yuushi Densetsu

=== PC Engine/TurboGrafx-16 ===
- Tricky Kick (titled Tricky in Japan)
- Sindibad: Chitei no Daimakyuu
- Sinistron (titled Violent Soldier in Japan)
- Sonic Spike (titled World Beach Volley in Japan)
- Cyber Core (published by NEC in America)

=== PC Engine CD ===
- Mateki Densetsu Astralius
- IQ Panic
