= List of One Piece episodes (seasons 1–8) =

First 263 episodes of One Piece

Box art of the first uncut English DVD released by Funimation Entertainment

One Piece is an anime series adapted from the manga of the same title written by Eiichiro Oda. Produced by Toei Animation, and directed by Konosuke Uda and Munehisa Sakai, the first eight seasons were broadcast on Fuji Television from October 20, 1999, to April 30, 2006. One Piece follows the adventures of Monkey D. Luffy, a 17-year-old young man whose body has gained the properties of rubber from accidentally eating a supernatural fruit, and his crew of diverse pirates, the Straw Hat Pirates. Luffy's greatest ambition is to obtain the ultimate treasure in the world, One Piece, and thereby become the next King of the Pirates.

The series uses 42 different pieces of theme music: 24 opening themes and 18 closing themes. Several CDs that contain the theme music and other tracks have been released by Toei Animation. The first DVD compilation was released on February 21, 2001, with individual volumes releasing monthly. The Singaporean company Odex released part of the series locally in English and Japanese in the form of dual audio video CDs.

In 2004, 4Kids Entertainment licensed the first five seasons for an English-language broadcast in North America. This dub was heavily edited for content, as well as length, reducing the first 143 episodes to 104.One Piece made its U.S. premiere on September 18, 2004, on the Fox network's Fox Box programming block, and also began airing on the Cartoon Network's Toonami block in April 2005. In December 2006, 4Kids cancelled production due to financial reasons.

In April 2007, Funimation Entertainment acquired the license of One Piece from 4Kids and would use their in-house voice cast in preparation for the series' DVD releases which also included redubbed versions of the episodes dubbed by 4Kids. Beginning with the sixth season, the Funimation dubbed episodes aired on Cartoon Network's Toonami block from September 2007 until March 2008, airing episodes 144 to 167. In Australia, Cartoon Network would resume airing new episodes in April 2008, and aired the remainder of the season from November 2008 to January 2009, from episode 170 through 195. The dub would later return to Toonami, now broadcast on Adult Swim, in May 2013. Adult Swim's broadcast began with episode 207 and continued until the show's removal in March 2017, after episode 384. The series would eventually return to the block in January 2022, beginning on episode 517.

The first unedited, bilingual DVD box set, containing 13 episodes, was released on May 27, 2008. Similarly sized sets followed with 31 sets released as of July 2015. Episodes had begun streaming since August 29, 2009.

== Series overview ==
Season	Main arc title(s)	Episodes	Originally released	
Season	Main arc title(s)	Episodes	First released	Last released
1	East Blue	61	October 20, 1999	March 7, 2001
2	Entering into the Grand Line	16	March 21, 2001	August 19, 2001
3	Introducing Chopper at Drum Kingdom	15	August 26, 2001	December 9, 2001
4	Alabasta	38	December 16, 2001	October 27, 2002
5	TV Original	13	November 3, 2002	February 2, 2003
6	Skypiea	52	February 9, 2003	June 13, 2004
7	Escape! The Naval Fortress & The Foxy Pirate Crew	33	June 20, 2004	March 27, 2005
8	Water Seven	35	April 17, 2005	April 30, 2006
9	Enies Lobby	73	May 21, 2006	December 23, 2007
10	Thriller Bark	45	January 6, 2008	December 14, 2008
11	Sabaody Archipelago	26	December 21, 2008	June 28, 2009
12	Amazon Lily	14	July 5, 2009	October 11, 2009
13	Impel Down	35	October 18, 2009	June 20, 2010
14	Marineford	60	June 27, 2010	September 25, 2011
15	Fish-Man Island	62	October 2, 2011	December 23, 2012
16	Punk Hazard	50	January 6, 2013	January 12, 2014
17	Dressrosa	118	January 19, 2014	June 19, 2016
18	Zou	36	June 26, 2016	April 2, 2017
19	Whole Cake Island	109	April 9, 2017	June 30, 2019
20	Wano Country	197	July 7, 2019	December 17, 2023
21	Egghead	67	January 7, 2024	December 28, 2025
22	Elbaph	25	April 5, 2026	TBA

== Episodes ==
=== Season 1: East Blue (1999–2001) ===
Orig.	4Kids	No. in season	4Kids title Original Japanese & Funimation titles	Directed by	Written by	Animation directed by	Original release date	English air date	Rank Rating (Note: Rank of the episode in Video Research's weekly, household-rating-based ranking of anime shows. The figures of the rank and rating column are taken from the same sources as the respective episode's original airdate.)
Romance Dawn
1	1	1	"I'm Gonna Be King of the Pirates!" "I'm Luffy! The Man Who's Gonna Be King of the Pirates!"; Transliteration: "Ore wa Rufi! Kaizoku Ō ni Naru Otoko Da!" (Japanese: 俺はルフィ!海賊王になる男だ!)	Kōnosuke Uda	Junki Takegami	Kazuya Hisada	October 20, 1999	September 18, 2004	6; 12.4
2	2	2	"Roronoa Zoro: Pirate Hunter" "Enter the Great Swordsman! Pirate Hunter Roronoa Zoro!"; Transliteration: "Daikengō Arawaru! Kaizokugari Roronoa Zoro" (Japanese: 大剣豪現る!海賊狩りロロノア·ゾロ)	Tetsuji Nakamura	Michiru Shimada	Eisaku Inoue	November 17, 1999	September 25, 2004	9; 11.7
3	3	3	"An Unlikely Pair: The Pirate & the Pirate Hunter" "Morgan vs. Luffy! Who's the Mysterious Pretty Girl?"; Transliteration: "Mōgan tai Rufi! Nazo no Bishōjo wa Dare?" (Japanese: モーガンVSルフィ!謎の美少女は誰?)	Hidehiko Kadota	Michiru Shimada	Kenji Yokoyama	November 24, 1999	October 2, 2004	7; 13.3
4	4	4	"The Passing Of The Hat" "Luffy's Past! Enter Red-Haired Shanks!"; Transliteration: "Rufi no Kako! Akagami no Shankusu Tōjō" (Japanese: ルフィの過去!赤髪のシャンクス登場)	Munehisa Sakai	Junki Takegami	Masayuki Takagi	December 8, 1999	October 9, 2004	9; 12.9
Orange Town
5	5	5	"The Circus Comes To Town" "A Terrifying Mysterious Power! Captain Buggy, the Clown Pirate!"; Transliteration: "Kyōfu Nazo no Chikara! Kaizoku Dōke Bagī-senchō!" (Japanese: 恐怖!謎の力·海賊道化バギー船長!)	Jun'ichi Fujise	Junki Takegami	Yūji Hakamada	December 15, 1999	October 16, 2004	8; 13.5
6	6	6	"The Beast Breaker" "Desperate Situation! Beast Tamer Mohji vs. Luffy!"; Transliteration: "Zettai Zetsumei! Mōjūtsukai Mōji tai Rufi!" (Japanese: 絶体絶命!猛獣使いモージvsルフィ!)	Shigeyasu Yamauchi	Mitsuru Shimada	Takeo Ide	December 29, 1999	October 23, 2004	1; 12.3
7	7	7	"The Desperate Duel" "Epic Showdown! Swordsman Zoro vs. Acrobat Cabaji!"; Transliteration: "Sōzetsu Kettō! Kengō Zoro tai Kyokugei no Kabaji!" (Japanese: 壮絶決闘!剣豪ゾロvs曲芸のカバジ!)	Tetsuji Nakamura	Mitsuru Shimada	Kazuya Hisada	December 29, 1999	October 30, 2004	1; 12.3
8	8	8	"Who Gets the Last Laugh?" "Who Is the Victor? Devil Fruit Power Showdown!"; Transliteration: "Shōsha wa Dotchi? Akuma no Mi no Nōryoku Taiketsu!" (Japanese: 勝者はどっち?悪魔の実の能力対決!)	Kōnosuke Uda	Michiru Shimada	Kenji Yokoyama	December 29, 1999	November 6, 2004	1; 12.3
Syrup Village
9	9	9	"The Teller of Tales" "The Honorable Liar? Captain Usopp!"; Transliteration: "Seigi no Usotsuki? Kyaputen Usoppu" (Japanese: 正義のうそつき?キャプテンウソップ)	Hidehiko Kadota	Junki Takegami	Eisaku Inoue	January 12, 2000	November 13, 2004	8; 11.4
10	10a	10	"The Bluff and the Bluffer" "The Weirdest Guy Ever! Jango the Hypnotist!"; Transliteration: "Shijō Saikyō no Hen na Yatsu! Saiminjutsushi Jango" (Japanese: 史上最強の変な奴!催眠術師ジャンゴ)	Munehisa Sakai	Junki Takegami	Masayuki Takagi	January 19, 2000	November 20, 2004	9; 12.7
11	10b 11a	11	"The Bluff and the Bluffer" / "The War at the Shore" "Expose the Plot! Pirate Butler, Captain Kuro!"; Transliteration: "Inbō o Abake! Kaizoku Shitsuji Kyaputen Kuro" (Japanese: 陰謀を暴け!海賊執事キャプテンクロ)	Shigeyasu Yamauchi	Junki Takegami	Yūji Hakamada	January 26, 2000	November 20, 2004	8; 12.1
11	10b 11a	11	"The Bluff and the Bluffer" / "The War at the Shore" "Expose the Plot! Pirate Butler, Captain Kuro!"; Transliteration: "Inbō o Abake! Kaizoku Shitsuji Kyaputen Kuro" (Japanese: 陰謀を暴け!海賊執事キャプテンクロ)	Shigeyasu Yamauchi	Junki Takegami	Yūji Hakamada	January 26, 2000	November 27, 2004	8; 12.1
12	11b	12	"The War at the Shore" "Clash with the Black Cat Pirates! The Great Battle on the Slope!"; Transliteration: "Gekitotsu! Kuroneko Kaizoku-dan Sakamichi no Daikōbō!" (Japanese: 激突!クロネコ海賊団坂道の大攻防!)	Jun'ichi Fujise	Junki Takegami	Takeo Ide	February 2, 2000	November 27, 2004	9; 13.2
13	12	13	"The Black Cat Pirates" "The Terrifying Duo! Meowban Brothers vs. Zoro!"; Transliteration: "Kyōfu no Futarigumi! Nyāban Burazāsu tai Zoro" (Japanese: 恐怖の二人組!ニャーバン兄弟VSゾロ)	Hidehiko Kadota	Junki Takegami	Kenji Yokoyama	February 9, 2000	December 4, 2004	7; 14.7
14	13	14	"Good Pirates vs. Bad Pirates" "Luffy Back in Action! Miss Kaya's Desperate Resistance!"; Transliteration: "Rufi Fukkatsu! Kaya-ojōsama no Kesshi no Teikō" (Japanese: ルフィ復活!カヤお嬢様の決死の抵抗)	Yukio Kaizawa	Junki Takegami	Eisaku Inoue	February 16, 2000	December 11, 2004	10; 12.8
15	14	15	"The Purr-fect plan" "Beat Kuro! Usopp the Man's Tearful Resolve!"; Transliteration: "Kuro o Taose! Otoko Usoppu Namida no Ketsui!" (Japanese: クロを倒せ!男ウソップ涙の決意!)	Kōnosuke Uda	Junki Takegami	Masayuki Takagi	February 23, 2000	December 18, 2004	6; 14.4
16	15	16	"The Long Arm of the Claw" "Protect Kaya! The Usopp Pirates' Great Efforts!"; Transliteration: "Kaya o Mamore! Usoppu Kaizoku-dan dai Katsuyaku!" (Japanese: カヤを守れ!ウソップ海賊団大活躍!)	Munehisa Sakai	Junki Takegami	Noboru Koizumi	March 1, 2000	January 8, 2005	8; 13.9
17	16	17	"The Cat's Ninth Life" "Anger Explosion! Kuro vs. Luffy! How it Ends!"; Transliteration: "Ikari Bakuhatsu! Kuro tai Rufi Ketchaku no Yukue!" (Japanese: 怒り爆発!クロVSルフィ決着の行方!)	Hidehiko Kadota	Junki Takegami	Yūji Hakamada	March 8, 2000	January 15, 2005	9; 14.1
18	17	18	"The Scrub in the Shrub" "You're the Weird Creature! Gaimon and His Strange Friends!"; Transliteration: "Anta ga Chinjū! Gaimon to Kimyō na Nakama" (Japanese: あんたが珍獣!ガイモンと奇妙な仲間)	Directed by : Jun'ichi Fujise; Storyboarded by : Kenji Yokoyama	Michiru Shimada	Tadayoshi Yamamuro	March 15, 2000	January 22, 2005	9; 12.0
Baratie
19	18	19	"Zoro's Pledge" "The Three-Sword Style's Past! Zoro and Kuina's Vow!"; Transliteration: "Santōryū no Kako! Zoro to Kuina no Chikai!" (Japanese: 三刀流の過去!ゾロとくいなの誓い!)	Kōnosuke Uda	Junki Takegami	Eisaku Inoue	March 22, 2000	January 29, 2005	4; 14.3
20	19	20	"King of the Busboys" "Famous Cook! Sanji of the Sea Restaurant!"; Transliteration: "Meibutsu Kokku! Kaijō Resutoran no Sanji" (Japanese: 名物コック!海上レストランのサンジ)	Yukio Kaizawa	Junki Takegami	Kenji Yokoyama	April 12, 2000	February 5, 2005	3; 15.0
21	20	21	"Respecting Sanji" "Unwelcome Customer! Sanji's Food and Ghin's Debt!"; Transliteration: "Manekarezaru Kyaku! Sanji no Meshi to Ghin no On" (Japanese: 招かれざる客!サンジの飯とギンの恩)	Hidehiko Kadota	Junki Takegami	Masayuki Takagi	April 12, 2000	February 12, 2005	3; 15.0
22	21	22	"Recipe for Disaster" "The Strongest Pirate Fleet! Commodore Don Krieg!"; Transliteration: "Saikyō no Kaizoku Kantai! Teitoku Don Kurīku" (Japanese: 最強の海賊艦隊!提督ドン·クリーク)	Directed by : Yōko Ikeda; Storyboarded by : Kōnosuke Uda	Junki Takegami	Kazuya Hisada	April 26, 2000	February 19, 2005	8; 12.2
23	22	23	"The Red Footed Pirate" "Protect Baratie! The Great Pirate, Red Foot Zeff!"; Transliteration: "Mamore Baratie! Dai Kaizoku – Akaashi no Zefu" (Japanese: 守れバラティエ!大海賊·赫足のゼフ)	Munehisa Sakai	Junki Takegami	Noboru Koizumi	May 3, 2000	February 26, 2005	—
24	23	24	"The Better Swordsman" "Hawk-Eye Mihawk! The Great Swordsman Zoro Falls at Sea!"; Transliteration: "Taka no Me no Mihōku! Kengō Zoro Umi ni Chiru" (Japanese: 鷹の目のミホーク!剣豪ゾロ海に散る)	Hidehiko Kadota	Michiru Shimada	Yūji Hakamada	May 10, 2000	March 5, 2005	8; 11.9
25	24	25	"Pearl Jam" "The Deadly Foot Technique Bursts Forth! Sanji vs. The Invincible Pearl!"; Transliteration: "Hissatsu Ashiwaza Sakuretsu! Sanji tai Teppeki no Pāru" (Japanese: 必殺足技炸裂!サンジVS鉄壁のパール)	Yūji Endō	Michiru Shimada	Takeo Ide	May 17, 2000	March 12, 2005	5; 13.7
26	25	26	"Stranded" "Zeff and Sanji's Dream! The Illusory All Blue!"; Transliteration: "Zefu to Sanji no Yume Maboroshi no Ōruburū" (Japanese: ゼフとサンジの夢·幻のオールブルー)	Munehisa Sakai	Michiru Shimada	Eisaku Inoue	May 24, 2000	March 19, 2005	7; 13.1
27	26	27	"Here We Go A Ghin" "Cool-headed, Cold-hearted Demon! Pirate Fleet Chief Commander Gin!"; Transliteration: "Reitetsu Hijō no Kijin Kaizoku Kantai Sōchō Gin" (Japanese: 冷徹非情の鬼人·海賊艦隊総隊長ギン)	Kōnosuke Uda	Junki Takegami	Kenji Yokoyama	May 31, 2000	March 26, 2005	3; 14.2
28	27	28	"Blitz Krieg" "I Won't Die! Fierce Battle! Luffy vs. Krieg!"; Transliteration: "Shinanee yo! Gekitō Rufi tai Kurīku!" (Japanese: 死なねェよ!激闘ルフィVSクリーク!)	Junji Shimizu	Junki Takegami	Masayuki Takagi	June 7, 2000	April 2, 2005	9; 12.1
29	28	29	"The Crack of Don" "The Conclusion of the Deadly Battle! A Spear of Blind Determination!"; Transliteration: "Shitō no Ketchaku! Hara ni Kukutta Ippon no Yari!" (Japanese: 決闘の決着!腹にくくった1本の槍!)	Jun'ichi Fujise	Junki Takegami	Kazuya Hisada	June 21, 2000	April 9, 2005	10; 10.6
30	29	30	"New Crew" "Set Sail! The Seafaring Cook Sets Off with Luffy!"; Transliteration: "Tabidachi! Umi no Kokku wa Rufi to Tomo Ni" (Japanese: 旅立ち!海のコックはルフィとともに)	Hidehiko Kadota	Junki Takegami	Noboru Koizumi	June 28, 2000	April 16, 2005	6; 13.2
Arlong Park
31	30	31	"The Mermen" "The Worst Man in the Eastern Seas! Fishman Pirate Arlong!"; Transliteration: "Higashi no Umi Saiaku no Otoko! Gyojin Kaizoku Āron!" (Japanese: 東の海最悪の男!魚人海賊アーロン!)	Yūji Endō	Michiru Shimada	Yūji Hakamada	July 12, 2000	April 23, 2005	8; 11.5
32	31	32	"The Thief With a Heart of Gold" "Witch of Cocoyashi Village! Arlong's Female Leader!"; Transliteration: "Kokoyashi Mura no Majo! Āron no On'nakanbu" (Japanese: ココヤシ村の魔女!アーロンの女幹部)	Munehisa Sakai	Michiru Shimada	Takeo Ide	July 19, 2000	April 30, 2005	2; 13.1
33	32	33	"The Marked Marksman" "Usopp Dead?! When Is Luffy Going to Make Landfall?!"; Transliteration: "Usoppu Shisu? Rufi Jōriku wa Mada?" (Japanese: ウソップ死す!?ルフィ上陸はまだ?)	Yukio Kaizawa	Michiru Shimada	Eisaku Inoue	July 19, 2000	May 7, 2005	2; 13.1
34	33	34	"It Takes A Thief" "Everyone's Gathered! Usopp Speaks the Truth About Nami!"; Transliteration: "Zen'in Shūketsu! Usoppu ga Kataru Nami no Shinjitsu" (Japanese: 全員集結!ウソップが語るナミの真実)	Junji Shimizu	Michiru Shimada	Kenji Yokoyama	July 26, 2000	May 14, 2005	5; 12.7
35	34a	35	"The Belle of the Brawl" "Untold Past! Female Warrior Bellemere!"; Transliteration: "Himerareta Kako! On'nasenshi Berumēru!" (Japanese: 秘められた過去!女戦士ベルメール!)	Hidehiko Kadota	Michiru Shimada	Masayuki Takagi	August 2, 2000	May 21, 2005	6; 11.5
36	34b	36	"The Belle of the Brawl" "Survive! Mother Bellemere and Nami's Bond!"; Transliteration: "Ikinuke! Haha Berumēru to Nami no Kizuna!" (Japanese: 生き抜け!母ベルメールとナミの絆!)	Kōnosuke Uda	Michiru Shimada	Kazuya Hisada	August 9, 2000	May 21, 2005	5; 12.2
37	35	37	"You Dirty Rat!" "Luffy Rises! Result of the Broken Promise!"; Transliteration: "Rufi Tatsu! Uragirareta Yakusoku no Ketsumatsu!" (Japanese: ルフィ立つ!裏切られた約束の結末)	Jun'ichi Fujise	Michiru Shimada	Hideaki Maniwa	August 16, 2000	May 28, 2005	5; 11.4
38	36	38	"War of the Species" "Luffy in Big Trouble! Fishmen vs. the Luffy Pirates!"; Transliteration: "Rufi Dai Pinchi! Gyojin tai Rufi Kaizoku-dan" (Japanese: ルフィ大ピンチ!魚人VSルフィ海賊団)	Yūji Endō	Michiru Shimada	Yūji Hakamada	August 23, 2000	June 4, 2005	3; 13.6
39	37a	39	"Arms Against Arms" "Luffy Submerged! Zoro vs. Hatchan the Octopus!"; Transliteration: "Rufi Suibotsu! Zoro tai Tako no Hatchan" (Japanese: ルフィ水没!ゾロVSタコのはっちゃん)	Junji Shimizu	Michiru Shimada	Kenji Yokoyama	August 30, 2000	June 11, 2005	5; 14.4
40	37b 38a	40	"Arms Against Arms" / "The Comeback Kid" "Proud Warriors! Sanji and Usopp's Fierce Battles!"; Transliteration: "Hokori Takaki Senshi! Gekitō Sanji to Usoppu" (Japanese: 誇り高き戦士!激闘サンジとウソップ)	Directed by : Yōko Ikeda; Storyboarded by : Kōnosuke Uda	Michiru Shimada	Tadayoshi Yamamuro	September 6, 2000	June 11, 2005	8; 13.6
40	37b 38a	40	"Arms Against Arms" / "The Comeback Kid" "Proud Warriors! Sanji and Usopp's Fierce Battles!"; Transliteration: "Hokori Takaki Senshi! Gekitō Sanji to Usoppu" (Japanese: 誇り高き戦士!激闘サンジとウソップ)	Directed by : Yōko Ikeda; Storyboarded by : Kōnosuke Uda	Michiru Shimada	Tadayoshi Yamamuro	September 6, 2000	June 18, 2005	8; 13.6
41	38b	41	"The Comeback Kid" "Luffy at Full Power! Nami's Determination and the Straw Hat!"; Transliteration: "Rufi Zenkai! Nami no Ketsui to Mugiwara Bōshi" (Japanese: ルフィ全開!ナミの決意と麦わら帽子)	Munehisa Sakai	Michiru Shimada	Eisaku Inoue	September 13, 2000	June 18, 2005	4; 13.6
42	38c 39a	42	"The Comeback Kid" / "Wanted!" "Explosion! Fishman Arlong's Fierce Assault from the Sea!"; Transliteration: "Sakuretsu! Gyojin Āron Umi Kara no Mōkōgeki!" (Japanese: 炸裂!魚人アーロン海からの猛攻撃!)	Hidehiko Kadota	Michiru Shimada	Masayuki Takagi	September 27, 2000	June 18, 2005	2; 15.0
42	38c 39a	42	"The Comeback Kid" / "Wanted!" "Explosion! Fishman Arlong's Fierce Assault from the Sea!"; Transliteration: "Sakuretsu! Gyojin Āron Umi Kara no Mōkōgeki!" (Japanese: 炸裂!魚人アーロン海からの猛攻撃!)	Hidehiko Kadota	Michiru Shimada	Masayuki Takagi	September 27, 2000	June 25, 2005	2; 15.0
43	39b	43	"Wanted!" "End of the Fishman Empire! Nami's My Friend!"; Transliteration: "Gyojin Teikoku no Owari! Nami wa Ore no Nakama da!" (Japanese: 魚人帝国の終り!ナミは俺の仲間だ!)	Junji Shimizu	Michiru Shimada	Kazuya Hisada	September 27, 2000	June 25, 2005	2; 15.0
44	-	44	"Setting Out with a Smile! Farewell, Hometown Cocoyashi Village!"; Transliteration: "Egao no Tabitachi! Saraba Kokyō Kokoyashi Mura" (Japanese: 笑顔の旅立ち!さらば故郷ココヤシ村)	Kōnosuke Uda	Michiru Shimada	Yūji Hakamada	October 11, 2000	—	5; 13.2
45	39c	45	"Wanted!" "Bounty! Straw Hat Luffy Becomes Known to the World!"; Transliteration: "Shōkinkubi! Mugiwara no Rufi yo ni Shirewataru" (Japanese: 賞金首!麦わらのルフィ世に知れ渡る)	Directed by : Yōko Ikeda; Storyboarded by : Kenji Yokoyama	Junki Takegami	Hideaki Maniwa	October 25, 2000	June 25, 2005	6; 13.6
Buggy's Adventure
46	—	46	"Chase Straw Hat! Little Buggy's Big Adventure!"; Transliteration: "Mugiwara o Oe! Chiisana Bagī no Dai Bōken" (Japanese: 麦わらを追え!小さなバギーの大冒険)	Munehisa Sakai	Junki Takegami	Kenji Yokoyama	November 1, 2000	—	6; 14.4
47	—	47	"The Wait Is Over! The Return of Captain Buggy!"; Transliteration: "Omachi Ka Ne! Aa Fukkatsu no Bagī Senchō" (Japanese: お待ちかね!ああ復活のバギー船長)	Hidehiko Kadota	Junki Takegami	Kazuo Takigawa	November 8, 2000	—	8; 13.5
Loguetown
48	40a	48	"Roguetown" "The Town of the Beginning and the End! Landfall at Logue Town!"; Transliteration: "Hajimari to Owari no Machi – Rōgutaun Jōriku" (Japanese: 始まりと終わりの町·ローグタウン上陸)	Directed by : Jun'ichi Fujise; Storyboarded by : Kōnosuke Uda	Michiru Shimada	Eisaku Inoue	November 22, 2000	July 2, 2005	5; 15.7
49	40b 41a	49	"Roguetown" / "Switched Blades" "Kitetsu III and Yubashiri! Zoro's New Swords and the Woman Sergeant Major!"; Transliteration: "Sandai Kitetsu to Yubashiri! Zoro no Shintō to Josōchō" (Japanese: 三代鬼徹と雪走!ゾロの新刀と女曹長)	Yoshihiro Ueda	Michiru Shimada	Tadayoshi Yamamuro	November 22, 2000	July 2, 2005	5; 15.7
49	40b 41a	49	"Roguetown" / "Switched Blades" "Kitetsu III and Yubashiri! Zoro's New Swords and the Woman Sergeant Major!"; Transliteration: "Sandai Kitetsu to Yubashiri! Zoro no Shintō to Josōchō" (Japanese: 三代鬼徹と雪走!ゾロの新刀と女曹長)	Yoshihiro Ueda	Michiru Shimada	Tadayoshi Yamamuro	November 22, 2000	July 9, 2005	5; 15.7
50	—	50	"Usopp vs. Daddy the Parent! Showdown at High!" (Note: In the dub, this title is written on-screen but "Usopp vs. Daddy the Father! Showdown at High Noon!" is read aloud.); Transliteration: "Usoppu tai Kozure no Dadi Mahiru no Kettō" (Japanese: ウソップVS子連れのダディ真昼の決闘)	Directed by : Katsumi Tokoro; Storyboarded by : Junji Shimizu	Michiru Shimada	Masayuki Takagi	November 29, 2000	—	5; 15.2
51	41b 42a	51	"Switched Blades" / "Sanji Sizzles" "Fiery Cooking Battle? Sanji vs. the Beautiful Chef!"; Transliteration: "Honō no Ryōri Batoru? Sanji tai Bijin Shefu" (Japanese: 炎の料理バトル?サンジVS美人シェフ)	Munehisa Sakai	Michiru Shimada	Kazuya Hisada	December 6, 2000	July 9, 2005	6; 14.0
51	41b 42a	51	"Switched Blades" / "Sanji Sizzles" "Fiery Cooking Battle? Sanji vs. the Beautiful Chef!"; Transliteration: "Honō no Ryōri Batoru? Sanji tai Bijin Shefu" (Japanese: 炎の料理バトル?サンジVS美人シェフ)	Munehisa Sakai	Michiru Shimada	Kazuya Hisada	December 6, 2000	July 16, 2005	6; 14.0
52	42b 43a	52	"Sanji Sizzles" / "Buggy's Back" "Buggy's Revenge! The Man Who Smiles on the Execution Platform!"; Transliteration: "Bagī no Ribenji! Shokeidai de Warau Otoko!" (Japanese: バギーのリベンジ!処刑台で笑う男!)	Hidehiko Kadota	Michiru Shimada	Yūji Hakamada	December 13, 2000	July 16, 2005	5; 14.7
52	42b 43a	52	"Sanji Sizzles" / "Buggy's Back" "Buggy's Revenge! The Man Who Smiles on the Execution Platform!"; Transliteration: "Bagī no Ribenji! Shokeidai de Warau Otoko!" (Japanese: バギーのリベンジ!処刑台で笑う男!)	Hidehiko Kadota	Michiru Shimada	Yūji Hakamada	December 13, 2000	July 23, 2005	5; 14.7
53	43b	53	"Buggy's Back" "The Legend Has Started! Head for the Grand Line!"; Transliteration: "Densetsu wa Hajimatta! Mezase Gurando Rain" (Japanese: 伝説は始まった!目指せ偉大なる航路(グランドライン))	Directed by : Ken Koyama; Storyboarded by : Yoshihiro Ueda	Michiru Shimada	Hideaki Maniwa	January 10, 2001	July 23, 2005	6; 14.1
Warship Island
54	—	54	"Precursor to a New Adventure! Apis, a Mysterious Girl!"; Transliteration: "Arata Naru Bōken no Yokan! Nazo no Shōjo Apisu" (Japanese: 新たなる冒険の予感!謎の少女アピス)	Kōnosuke Uda	Junki Takegami	Kenji Yokoyama	January 17, 2001	—	8; 14.1
55	—	55	"Miraculous Creature! Apis' Secret and the Legendary Island!"; Transliteration: "Kiseki no Seibutsu! Apisu no Himitsu to Densetsu no Shima" (Japanese: 奇跡の生物!アピスの秘密と伝説の島)	Harume Kosaka	Junki Takegami	Masayuki Takagi	January 24, 2001	—	7; 15.3
56	—	56	"Eric Attacks! Great Escape from Warship Island!"; Transliteration: "Erikku Shutsugeki! Gunkanjima Kara no Dai Dasshutsu!" (Japanese: エリック出撃!軍艦島からの大脱出!)	Hidehiko Kadota	Junki Takegami	Kazuya Hisada	January 31, 2001	—	6; 14.7
57	—	57	"A Solitary Island in the Distant Sea! The Legendary Lost Island!"; Transliteration: "Zekkai no Kotō! Densetsu no Rosuto Airando" (Japanese: 絶海の孤島!伝説のロストアイランド)	Yōko Ikeda	Junki Takegami	Kazuo Takigawa	February 7, 2001	—	8; 14.6
58	—	58	"Showdown in the Ruins! Tense Zoro vs. Eric!"; Transliteration: "Haikyō no Kettō! Kinpaku no Zoro tai Erikku!" (Japanese: 廃虚の決闘!緊迫のゾロVSエリック)	Munehisa Sakai	Junki Takegami	Tadayoshi Yamamuro	February 21, 2001	—	5; 16.6
59	—	59	"Luffy, Completely Surrounded! Commodore Nelson's Secret Strategy!"; Transliteration: "Rufu Kanzen Hōi! Teitoku Neruson no Hissaku" (Japanese: ルフィ完全包囲!提督ネルソンの秘策)	Jun'ichi Fujise	Junki Takegami	Yūji Hakamada	February 21, 2001	—	5; 16.6
60	—	60	"Through the Sky They Soar! The 1000-Year Legend Lives Again!"; Transliteration: "Ōsora o Mau Mono! Yomigaeru Sennen no Densetsu!" (Japanese: 大空を舞うもの!甦る千年の伝説)	Yoshihiro Ueda	Junki Takegami	Hideaki Maniwa	February 28, 2001	—	4; 16.3
61	44a	61	"Fantastic Voyage" "An Angry Showdown! Cross the Red Line!"; Transliteration: "Ikari no Ketchaku! Akai Dairiku o Norikoero!" (Japanese: 怒りの決着!赤い大陸を乗り越えろ!)	Hidehiko Kadota	Junki Takegami	Kenji Yokoyama	March 7, 2001	July 30, 2005	4; 16.0

=== Season 2: Entering into the Grand Line (2001) ===
Orig.	4Kids	No. in season	4Kids title Original Japanese & Funimation titles	Directed by	Written by	Animation directed by	Original release date	English air date	Rank Rating
Reverse Mountain
62	44b	1	"Fantastic Voyage" "The First Line of Defence? The Giant Whale Laboon Appears!"; Transliteration: "Sasho no Toride? Kyodai Kujira Rabūn Arawareru" (Japanese: 最初の砦?巨大クジラ·ラブーン現る)	Kōnosuke Uda	Michiru Shimada	Masayuki Takagi	March 14, 2001 (Note: Episodes 62 and 63 aired together as a television special.)	July 30, 2005	6; 13.7
63	-	2	"A Promise Between Men! Luffy and the Whale Vow to Meet Again!"; Transliteration: "Otoko no Yakusoku! Rufi to Kujira Saikai no Chikai" (Japanese: 男の約束! ルフィとクジラ再会の誓い)	Harume Kosaka	Michiru Shimada	Kazuya Hisada	March 21, 2001	—	6; 13.7
Whiskey Peak
64	44c	3	"Fantasic Voyage" "A Town That Welcomes Pirates? Setting Foot on Whiskey Peak!"; Transliteration: "Kaizoku Kangei no Machi? Uisukīpīku Jōriku" (Japanese: 海賊歓迎の町? ウイスキーピーク上陸)	Directed by : Yōko Ikeda; Storyboarded by : Kenji Yokoyama	Michiru Shimada	Kazuo Takigawa	April 15, 2001 (Note: Episodes 64 and 65 aired together as a television special.)	July 30, 2005	2; 17.2
65	45	4	"Baroque Works" "Explosion! The Three Swords Style! Zoro vs. Baroque Works!"; Transliteration: "Sakuretsu Santōryū! Zoro tai Barokku Wākusu" (Japanese: 炸裂三刀流! ゾロVSバロックワークス)	Yoshihiro Ueda	Michiru Shimada	Tadayoshi Yamamuro	April 15, 2001	August 6, 2005	2; 17.2
66	46	5	"Luffy vs. Zoro" "All Out Battle! Luffy vs. Zoro! Mysterious Grand Duel!"; Transliteration: "Shinken Shōbu! Rufi tai Zoro Nazo no Dai Kettō" (Japanese: 真剣勝負! ルフィVSゾロ謎の大決闘!)	Hidehiko Kadota	Michiru Shimada	Yūji Hakamada	April 22, 2001	August 13, 2005	5 (Note: Episode 66 shared a fifth place with an episode of Inuyasha.); 14.1
67	47a	6	"Escape From Misty Peak" "Deliver Princess Vivi! The Luffy Pirates Set Sail!"; Transliteration: "Ōjo Bibi o Todokero! Rufi Kaizoku Dan Shukkō" (Japanese: 王女ビビを届けろ! ルフィ海賊団出航)	Kōnosuke Uda	Michiru Shimada	Hideaki Maniwa	April 29, 2001	August 20, 2005	4; 15.0
Diary of Coby-Meppo
68	—	7	"Try Hard, Coby! Coby and Helmeppo's Struggles in the Marines!"; Transliteration: "Ganbare Kobī! Kobimeppo Kaigun Funtōki" (Japanese: 頑張れコビー! コビメッポ海軍奮闘記)	Harume Kosaka	Michiru Shimada	Kenji Yokoyama	May 13, 2001	—	3; 14.6
69	—	8	"Coby and Helmeppo's Resolve! Vice-Admiral Garp's Parental Affection!"; Transliteration: "Kobimeppo no Ketsui! Gāpu Chūshō no Oyagokoro" (Japanese: コビメッポの決意! ガープ中将の親心)	Munehisa Sakai	Michiru Shimada	Masayuki Takagi	May 20, 2001	—	3; 15.8
Little Garden
70	—	9	"An Ancient Island! The Shadow Hiding in Little Garden!"; Transliteration: "Taiko no Shima! Ritoru Gāden ni Hisomu Kage!" (Japanese: 太古の島! リトルガーデンに潜む影!)	Yūji Endō	Junki Takegami	Kazuya Hisada	May 27, 2001	—	6; 13.1
71	—	10	"Huge Duel! The Giants Dorry and Broggy!"; Transliteration: "Dekkai Kettō! Kyojin Dorī to Burogī" (Japanese: でっかい決闘! 巨人ドリーとブロギー)	Hidehiko Kadota	Junki Takegami	Takeo Ide	June 3, 2001	—	3; 14.7
72	—	11	"Luffy Gets Angry! A Dirty Trick Violates the Sacred Duel!"; Transliteration: "Rufi Okoru! Seinaru Kettō ni Hiretsu na Wana" (Japanese: ルフィ怒る! 聖なる決闘に卑劣な罠)	Yōko Ikeda	Junki Takegami	Eisaku Inoue	June 17, 2001	—	8; 12.5
73	—	12	"Broggy's Bitter Tears of Victory! The Conclusion of Elbaf!"; Transliteration: "Burogī Shōri no Gōkyū! Erubafu no Ketchaku!" (Japanese: ブロギー勝利の号泣! エルバフの決着)	Yoshihiro Ueda	Junki Takegami	Yūji Hakamada	June 24, 2001	—	4; 15.3
74	—	13	"The Devilish Candle! Tears of Regret and Tears of Anger!"; Transliteration: "Ma no Cyandoru! Munen no Namida to Okari no Namida" (Japanese: 魔のキャンドル! 無念の涙と怒りの涙)	Kōnosuke Uda	Junki Takegami	Hideaki Maniwa	July 15, 2001	—	3; 15.6
75	—	14	"A Hex on Luffy! Colors Trap!"; Transliteration: "Rufi o Osō Maryoku! Karāzutorappu!" (Japanese: ルフィを襲う魔力! カラーズトラップ)	Jun'ichi Fujise	Junki Takegami	Kenji Yokoyama	August 12, 2001	—	6; 12.8
76	—	15	"Time to Fight Back! Usopp's Quick Thinking and Fire Star!"; Transliteration: "Iza Hangeki! Usoppu no Kiten to Kaenboshi!" (Japanese: いざ反撃! ウソップの機転と火炎星!)	Harume Kosaka	Junki Takegami	Masayuki Takagi	August 19, 2001 (Note: Episodes 76 and 77 aired as a television special alongside an episode of Kochikame.)	—	2; 14.9
77	47b	16	"Escape From Misty Peak" "Farewell Giant Island! Head for Alabasta!"; Transliteration: "Saraba Kyojin no Shima! Arabasuta o Mezase" (Japanese: さらば巨人の島! アラバスタを目指せ)	Yūji Endō	Junki Takegami	Kazuya Hisada	August 19, 2001	August 20, 2005	2; 14.9

=== Season 3: Introducing Chopper at the Winter Island (2001) ===
Orig.	4Kids	No. in season	4Kids title/Funimation title Original Japanese title	Directed by	Written by	Animation directed by	Original release date	English air date
Drum Island
78	48a	1	"Saving Nami" "Nami's Sick? Beyond the Snow Falling on the Sea!"; Transliteration: "Nami ga byōki? Umi ni furu yuki no mukō ni!" (Japanese: ナミが病気?海に降る雪の向こうに!)	Yoshihiro Ueda	Junki Takegami	Noboru Koizumi	August 26, 2001	August 27, 2005
79	48b	2	"Saving Nami" "A Raid! The Tin Tyrant and Tin Plate Wapol!"; Transliteration: "Kishū! Burikingu gō to Buriki no Waporu" (Japanese: 奇襲!ブリキング号とブリキのワポル)	Junji Shimizu	Junki Takegami	Eisaku Inoue	September 2, 2001	August 27, 2005
80	48c 49a	3	"Saving Nami"/"Rabid Rabbits" "An Island without Doctors? Adventure in a Nameless Land!"; Transliteration: "Isha no inai shima? Na mo naki kuni no bōken" (Japanese: 医者のいない島?名も無き国の冒険!)	Munehisa Sakai	Michiru Shimada	Yūji Hakamada	September 9, 2001	August 27, 2005
80	48c 49a	3	"Saving Nami"/"Rabid Rabbits" "An Island without Doctors? Adventure in a Nameless Land!"; Transliteration: "Isha no inai shima? Na mo naki kuni no bōken" (Japanese: 医者のいない島?名も無き国の冒険!)	Munehisa Sakai	Michiru Shimada	Yūji Hakamada	September 9, 2001	September 10, 2005
81	49b 50a	4	"Rabid Rabbits"/"Avalanche!" "Are You Happy? The Doctor Called Witch!"; Transliteration: "Happī kai? Majo to yobareta isha!" (Japanese: ハッピーかい?魔女と呼ばれた医者!)	Kōnosuke Uda	Michiru Shimada	Hideaki Maniwa	September 16, 2001	September 10, 2005
81	49b 50a	4	"Rabid Rabbits"/"Avalanche!" "Are You Happy? The Doctor Called Witch!"; Transliteration: "Happī kai? Majo to yobareta isha!" (Japanese: ハッピーかい?魔女と呼ばれた医者!)	Kōnosuke Uda	Michiru Shimada	Hideaki Maniwa	September 16, 2001	September 17, 2005
82	50b	5	"Avalanche!" "Dalton's Resolve! Wapol's Corps Lands on the Island!"; Transliteration: "Doruton no kakugo! Waporu gundan shima ni jōriku" (Japanese: ドルトンの覚悟!ワポル軍団島に上陸)	Harume Kosaka	Michiru Shimada	Kenji Yokoyama	October 7, 2001 (Note: In Japan, episodes 82 and 83 aired as part of a special alongside an episode of Kochikame.)	September 17, 2005
83	51	6	"The Big Climb" "The Island Where Snow Lives! Climb the Drum Rockies!"; Transliteration: "Yuki no sumi shima! Doramu Rokkī o nobore!" (Japanese: 雪の住む島!ドラムロッキーを登れ!)	Hidehiko Kadota	Michiru Shimada	Masayuki Takagi	October 7, 2001	September 24, 2005
84	52	7	"Tony Tony Chopper" "Blue-nosed Reindeer! Chopper's Secret!"; Transliteration: "Tonakai wa aoppana! Choppā no himitsu!" (Japanese: トナカイは青っ鼻!チョッパーの秘密)	Daisuke Nishio	Michiru Shimada	Kazuya Hisada	October 21, 2001	October 1, 2005
85	53	8	"Freaky" "An Outcast's Dream! Hiriluk the Quack!"; Transliteration: "Hamidashimono no yume! Yabu isha Hiruruku!" (Japanese: はみだし者の夢!やぶ医者ヒルルク!)	Yoshihiro Ueda	Michiru Shimada	Noboru Koizumi	October 28, 2001	October 8, 2005
86	54	9	"The Impossible Dream" "Hiriluk's Cherry Blossoms and the Will that Gets Carried On!"; Transliteration: "Hiruruku no sakura to uketsugare yuku ishi!" (Japanese: ヒルルクの桜と受け継がれゆく意志!)	Kōnosuke Uda	Michiru Shimada	Eisaku Inoue	November 4, 2001	October 15, 2005
87	55	10	"Defending the Flag" "Fight Wapol's Crew! The Power of the Munch Munch Fruit!"; Transliteration: "VS Waporu gundan! Bakubaku no mi no nōryoku!" (Japanese: VSワポル軍団!バクバクの実の能力!)	Junji Shimizu	Michiru Shimada	Takeo Ide	November 11, 2001	October 22, 2005
88	56	11	"Let's Get Ready to Rumble" "Zoan-type Devil Fruit! Chopper's Seven-form Transformation!"; Transliteration: "Zōn kei akuma no mi! Choppā Shichidan Hengei" (Japanese: 動物系悪魔の実!チョッパー七段変形)	Hidehiko Kadota	Michiru Shimada	Hideaki Maniwa	November 18, 2001	October 29, 2005
89	57	12	"The Once & Future King" "When the Kingdom's Rule Ends! The Flag of Faith Flies Forever!"; Transliteration: "Ōkoku no shihai owaru toki! Shinnen no hata wa eien ni" (Japanese: 王国の支配終る時!信念の旗は永遠に)	Jun'ichi Fujise	Michiru Shimada	Kenji Yokoyama	November 25, 2001	November 5, 2005
90	58	13	"Doc Rock" "Hiriluk's Cherry Blossoms! Miracle in the Drum Rockies!"; Transliteration: "Hiruruku no sakura! Doramu Rokkī no kiseki" (Japanese: ヒルルクの桜!ドラムロッキーの奇跡)	Munehisa Sakai	Michiru Shimada	Masayuki Takagi	December 2, 2001	November 12, 2005
91	59	14	"Heading For Disaster" "Goodbye Drum Island! I'm Going Out to Sea!"; Transliteration: "Sayōnara Doramujima! Boku wa umi e deru!" (Japanese: さようならドラム島!僕は海へ出る!)	Harume Kosaka	Michiru Shimada	Kazuya Hisada	December 9, 2001	February 11, 2006
92	60	15	"Face Off" "Alabasta's Hero and a Ballerina on the Ship!"; Transliteration: "Arabasuta no eiyū to senjō no barerīna" (Japanese: アラバスタの英雄と船上のバレリーナ)	Yūji Endō	Junki Takegami	Noboru Koizumi	December 9, 2001	February 18, 2006

=== Season 4: Alabasta (2001–02) ===
Orig.	4Kids	No. in season	4Kids title / Funimation title Original Japanese title	Directed by	Written by	Animation directed by	Original release date	English air date (Note: The sources cited here are disputed, showing different dates of when the episodes originally aired in the United States. This article would showcase the dates of when the episodes potentially had their original airdate.)
Alabasta
93	61	1	"Boogie Powder" "Off to the Desert Kingdom! The Rain-Summoning Powder and the Rebel Army!"; Transliteration: "Iza sabaku no kuni e! Ame o yobu kona to hanrangun" (Japanese: いざ砂漠の国へ!雨を呼ぶ粉と反乱軍)	Kōnosuke Uda	Junki Takegami	Eisaku Inoue	December 16, 2001	February 25, 2006
94	62	2	"Chasing Luffy" "The Heroes Reunion! His Name is Fire Fist Ace!"; Transliteration: "Gōketsutachi no saikai! Yatsu no na wa hiken no Ēsu" (Japanese: 豪傑達の再会!奴の名は火拳のエース)	Junji Shimizu	Michiru Shimada	Takeo Ide	December 23, 2001	March 4, 2006
95	63	3	"Oh, Brother!" "Ace and Luffy! Hot Emotions and Brotherly Bonds!"; Transliteration: "Ēsu to Luffy! Atsuki omoi to kyōdai no kizuna" (Japanese: エースとルフィ!熱き想いと兄弟の絆)	Hidehiko Kadota	Michiru Shimada	Hideaki Maniwa	January 6, 2002 (Note: Episode 95 originally aired as part of a special alongside episodes of Sazae-san, Chibi Maruko-chan, and Kochikame.)	March 11, 2006
96	64	4	"All Dried Up" "Erumalu, the City of Green and the Kung Fu Dugongs!"; Transliteration: "Midori no machi Erumaru to Kunfū Jugon!" (Japanese: 緑の町エルマルとクンフージュゴン!)	Yōko Ikeda	Michiru Shimada	Kenji Yokoyama	January 13, 2002	March 11, 2006; March 18, 2006
97	65	5	"Humps, Bumps & Chumps" "Adventure in the Country of Sand! The Monsters that Live in the Scorching Land!"; Transliteration: "Suna no kuni no bōken! Ennetsu no daichi ni sugomu mamono" (Japanese: 砂の国の冒険!炎熱の大地に棲む魔物)	Harume Kosaka	Junki Takegami	Kazuya Hisada	January 20, 2002	March 25, 2006; April 29, 2006
98	66	6	"The Sand Trap" "Enter the Desert Pirates! The Men Who Live Freely!"; Transliteration: "Sabaku no kaizokudan tōjō! Jiyū ni ikiru otokotachi" (Japanese: 砂漠の海賊団登場!自由に生きる男達)	Daisuke Nishio	Junki Takegami	Masayuki Takagi	January 27, 2002	April 5, 2006; May 6, 2006
99	67	7	"Tough Bluff" "False Fortitude! Camu, Rebel Soldier at Heart!"; Transliteration: "Nisemono no iji! Kokoro no hanrangun Kamyu!" (Japanese: ニセモノの意地!心の反乱軍カミュ!)	Munehisa Sakai	Junki Takegami	Eisaku Inoue	February 3, 2002	April 6, 2006; May 13, 2006
100	68	8	"Kids of the Kingdom" "Rebel Warrior Koza! The Dream Vowed to Vivi!"; Transliteration: "Hanrangun senshi Kōza! Bibi ni chikatta yume!" (Japanese: 反乱軍戦士コーザ!ビビに誓った夢!)	Yūji Endō	Junki Takegami	Takeo Ide	February 10, 2002	April 10, 2006; May 20, 2006
101	69	9	"Scorpion" "Showdown in a Heat Haze! Ace vs. the Gallant Scorpion!"; Transliteration: "Yōen no kettō! Ēsu vs otoko sukōpion" (Japanese: 陽炎の決闘!エースVS男スコーピオン)	Hidehiko Kadota	Michiru Shimada	Kenji Yokoyama	February 17, 2002	April 11, 2006
102	70	10	"Secret Beneath the Sand" "Ruins and Lost Ways! Vivi, Her Friends, and the Country's Form!"; Transliteration: "Kiseki to maigo! Bibi to nakama to kuni no katachi" (Japanese: 遺跡と迷子!ビビと仲間と国のかたち)	Kōnosuke Uda	Michiru Shimada	Hideaki Maniwa	February 24, 2002	April 12, 2006; June 3, 2006
103	71	11	"Odd Numbers" "Spiders Café at 8 o'Clock! The Enemy Leaders Gather!"; Transliteration: "Supaidāzu Kafe ni hachiji teki kanbu shūgō" (Japanese: スパイダーズカフェに8時敵幹部集合)	Harume Kosaka	Junki Takegami	Masayuki Takagi	March 3, 2002	April 13, 2006; June 10, 2006
104	72	12	"Zero" "Luffy vs. Vivi! The Tearful Vow to Put Friends on the Line!"; Transliteration: "Rufi vs Bibi! Nakama ni kakeru namida no chikai" (Japanese: ルフィVSビビ!仲間に賭ける涙の誓い)	Ken Koyama	Junki Takegami	Eisaku Inoue	March 10, 2002	June 17, 2006
105	73	13	"Chase to Rainbase" "The Battlefront of Alabasta! Rainbase, the City of Dreams!"; Transliteration: "Arabasuta sensen! Yume no machi Reinbēsu!" (Japanese: アラバスタ戦線!夢の町レインベース)	Yūji Endō	Michiru Shimada	Naoki Tate & Masahiro Shimanuki	March 17, 2002	June 24, 2006
106	74	14	"Caged!" "The Trap of Certain Defeat! Storming Raindinners!"; Transliteration: "Zettai zetsumei no wana! Reindināzu totsunyū" (Japanese: 絶体絶命の罠!レインディナーズ突入)	Hidehiko Kadota	Michiru Shimada	Takeo Ide	March 24, 2002	July 1, 2006
107	75	15	"Kingnapped" "Operation Utopia Commences! The Swell of Rebellion Stirs!"; Transliteration: "Yūtopia sakusen hatsudō! Ugokidashita uneri" (Japanese: ユートピア作戦発動!動き出した)	Kōnosuke Uda	Michiru Shimada	Kenji Yokoyama	April 14, 2002	July 8, 2006
108	76	16	"They Call Me Mr. Prince" "The Terrifying Banana Gators and Mr. Prince!"; Transliteration: "Kyōfu no Bananawani to Misutā Purinsu" (Japanese: 恐怖のバナナワニとミスタープリンス)	Ken Koyama	Michiru Shimada	Hideaki Maniwa	April 21, 2002	July 8, 2006
109	77	17	"The Great Escape" "The Key to a Great Comeback Escape! The Wax-Wax Ball!"; Transliteration: "Gyakuden dai dasshutsu e no kagi! Dorudoru Bōru!" (Japanese: 逆転大脱出への鍵!ドルドルボール!)	Daisuke Nishio	Junki Takegami	Masayuki Takagi	April 28, 2002	February 3, 2007
110	78	18	"Zero Tolerance" "Merciless Mortal Combat! Luffy vs. Crocodile!"; Transliteration: "Nasakemuyō no shitō! Rufi vs Kurokodairu!" (Japanese: 情無用の死闘!ルフィVSクロコダイル)	Yūji Endō	Junki Takegami	Eisaku Inoue	May 5, 2002	February 10, 2007
111	79	19	"Off the Hook" "Dash For a Miracle! Alabasta Animal Land!"; Transliteration: "Kiseki e no Shissō! Arabasuta Dōbutsu Rando" (Japanese: 奇跡への疾走!アラバスタ動物ランド)	Jun'ichi Fujise	Junki Takegami	Natsuko Makiyo	May 12, 2002	February 17, 2007
112	80	20	"Rebel Rousers" "Rebel Army vs. Royal Army! Showdown at Alubarna!"; Transliteration: "Hanrangun vs kokuōgun! Kessen wa Arubāna!" (Japanese: 反乱軍VS国王軍!決戦はアルバーナ!)	Munehisa Sakai	Michiru Shimada	Naoki Tate & Masahiro Shimanuki	May 19, 2002	February 24, 2007
113	81	21	"Two Bad" "Alubarna Grieves! The Fierce Captain Karoo!"; Transliteration: "Naki no Arubāna! Gekitō Karū taichō" (Japanese: 嘆きのアルバーナ!激闘カルー隊長!)	Hidehiko Kadota	Michiru Shimada	Kazuya Hisada	June 2, 2002	March 3, 2007
114	82	22	"Extra Innings" "Sworn on a Friend's Dream! The Battle of Molehill, Block 4!"; Transliteration: "Nakama no yumi ni chikau! Kettō Mogura tsuka 4 banchō" (Japanese: 仲間の夢に誓う!決闘モグラ塚4番街)	Directed by : Kōji Tanaka; Storyboarded by : Kōnosuke Uda	Junki Takegami	Noboru Koizumi	June 9, 2002	March 10, 2007
115	83	23	"Blow Up!" "Big Opening Day Today! The Copy-Copy Montage!"; Transliteration: "Honjitsu dai kōkai! Manemane Montāju!" (Japanese: 本日大公開!マネマネモンタージュ!)	Harume Kosaka	Junki Takegami	Takeo Ide	June 16, 2002	March 17, 2007
116	84	24	"Trading Faces" "Transformed into Nami! Bon Clay's Rapid-Fire Ballet Kenpo!"; Transliteration: "Nami ni henshin! Bonkurē renpatsu baree Kenpō" (Japanese: ナミに変身!ボンクレ-連発バレエ拳法)	Ken Koyama	Michiru Shimada	Kenji Yokoyama	June 23, 2002	March 24, 2007
117	85	25	"The Weather Forcer" "Nami's Cyclone Advisory! Clima Takt Burst!"; Transliteration: "Nami no senpū chūihō! Kurimatakuto sakuretsu" (Japanese: ナミの旋風注意報!クリマタクト炸裂)	Yōko Ikeda	Michiru Shimada	Hideaki Maniwa	June 30, 2002	April 14, 2007
118	86	26	"Bad Girls" "Secret Passed Down in the Royal Family! The Ancient Weapon Pluton!"; Transliteration: "Ōke ni tsuwaru himitsu! Kodai heiki Puruton" (Japanese: 王家に伝わる秘密!古代兵器プルトン)	Yūji Endō	Michiru Shimada	Masayuki Takagi	July 14, 2002	April 21, 2007
119	87	27	"Zoro vs. Mr. One" "Secret of Powerful Swordplay! Ability to Cut Steel and the Rhythm Things Have!"; Transliteration: "Gōken no kyokui! Kōtetsu o kiru chikara to mono no kokyū" (Japanese: 豪剣の極意!鋼鉄を斬る力と物の呼吸)	Munehisa Sakai	Junki Takegami	Eisaku Inoue	July 21, 2002	April 28, 2007
120	88	28	"Hook, Lie & Sinker" "The Battle is Over! Koza Raises the White Flag!"; Transliteration: "Tatakai wa owatta! Kōza ga ageta shiroi hata" (Japanese: 戦いは終わった!コーザが掲げた白い旗)	Hidehiko Kadota	Junki Takegami	Kazuya Hisada	August 4, 2002	May 5, 2007
121	89	29	"His Fatal Flaw" "Where Vivi's Voice Gets Heard! The Hero Descends!"; Transliteration: "Bibi no koe no yukue! Hīrō wa maiorita!" (Japanese: ビビの声の行方!英雄は舞い降りた!)	Harume Kosaka	Junki Takegami	Natsuko Makiyo	August 11, 2002	May 12, 2007
122	90	30	"Live & Let Dry" "Sand Croc and Water Luffy! The Second Round of the Duel!"; Transliteration: "Suna wani to mizu Rufi! Kettō dai ni raundo" (Japanese: 砂ワニと水ルフィ!決闘第2ラウンド)	Directed by : Jun'ichi Fujise; Storyboarded by : Kenji Yokoyama	Michiru Shimada	Takeo Ide	August 18, 2002	May 19, 2007
123	91	31	"The Crypt Script" "That Looks Croc-ish! Luffy, Run to the Royal Tomb!"; Transliteration: "Wanippoi! Ōke no haka e hashire Rufi!" (Japanese: ワニっぽい!王家の墓へ走れルフィ!)	Junji Shimizu	Michiru Shimada	Kenji Yokoyama	August 25, 2002	May 26, 2007
124	92	32	"The Sweat Threat" "The Nightmare Draws Near! This is the Sand-Sand Clan's Secret Base!"; Transliteration: "Akumu no toki semaru! Koko wa Sunasunadan himitsu kichi" (Japanese: 悪夢の時迫る!ここは砂砂団秘密基地)	Yūji Endō	Michiru Shimada	Takayuki Shimura	September 1, 2002	June 9, 2007
125	93	33	"The Bomb in the Belfry" "Magnificent Wings! My Name is Pell, Guardian Deity of the Country!"; Transliteration: "Idai naru tsubame! Wa ga na wa kuno no shigoshin Peru" (Japanese: 偉大なる翼!我が名は国の守護神ペル)	Hidehiko Kadota	Yoshiyuki Suga	Hideaki Maniwa	September 8, 2002	June 16, 2007
126	94	34	"Sandbagged" "I Will Surpass You! Rain Falls in Alabasta!"; Transliteration: "Koete iku! Arabasuta ni ame ga furu!" (Japanese: 越えていく!アラバスタに雨が降る!)	Munehisa Sakai	Michiru Shimada	Eisaku Inoue	September 15, 2002	June 23, 2007
127	95	35	"All the King's Men" "A Farewell to Arms! Pirates and Different Ideas of Justice!"; Transliteration: "Buki yo saraba! Kaizoku to ikutsu ka no seigi" (Japanese: 武器よさらば!海賊といくつかの正義)	Harume Kosaka	Yoshiyuki Suga	Masayuki Takagi	October 6, 2002 (Note: Episodes 127 and 128 originally aired as part of a special alongside an episode of Kochikame.)	June 30, 2007
128	96	36	"The Turn of the Two" "Pirates' Banquet and Operation Escape from Alabasta!"; Transliteration: "Kaizokutachi no utage to Arabasuta dasshutsu sakusen!" (Japanese: 海賊たちの宴とアラバスタ脱出作戦!)	Junji Shimizu	Yoshiyuki Suga	Noboru Koizumi	October 6, 2002	July 14, 2007
129	97	37	"Pirate Vivi?" "It All Started On That Day! Vivi Tells the Story of Her Adventure!"; Transliteration: "Hajimaru wa ano hi! Bibi ga kataru bōkendan" (Japanese: 始まりはあの日!ビビが語る冒険譚)	Daisuke Nishio	Yoshiyuki Suga	Kazuya Hisada	October 20, 2002	July 21, 2007
130	98	38	"Stowaway" "Scent of Danger! The Seventh Member is Nico Robin!"; Transliteration: "Kiken na kaori! Shichininme wa Niko Robin!" (Japanese: 危険な香り!七人目はニコ·ロビン!)	Yōko Ikeda	Yoshiyuki Suga	Takayuki Shimura	October 27, 2002	July 28, 2007

=== Season 5: Dreams!, The Zenny Pirate Crew Sortie!, Beyond the Rainbow (2002–03) ===
Orig.	4Kids	No. in season	4Kids title / Funimation title Original Japanese title	Directed by	Written by	Animation directed by	Original release date	English air date
Dreams!
131	—	1	"The First Patient! The Untold Story of the Rumble Ball!"; Transliteration: "Hajimete no Kanja! Ranburu Bōru Hiwa" (Japanese: はじめての患者! ランブルボール秘話)	Yūji Endō	Michiru Shimada	Kenji Yokoyama	November 3, 2002	—
132	—	2	"Uprising of the Navigator! For the Unyielding Dream!"; Transliteration: "Kōkaishi no Hanran! Yuzure Nai Yume no Tame ni!" (Japanese: 航海士の反乱! ゆずれない夢の為に!)	Harume Kosaka	Ryōta Yamaguchi	Takeo Ide	November 10, 2002	—
133	—	3	"A Recipe Handed Down! Sanji, the Iron Man of Curry!"; Transliteration: "Uketsugareru Yume! Karē no Tetsujin Sanji" (Japanese: 受け継がれる夢! カレーの鉄人サンジ)	Hidehiko Kadota	Junki Takegami	Masayuki Takagi	November 17, 2002	—
134	—	4	"I Will Make it Bloom! Usopp, the Man, and the Eight-Foot Shell!"; Transliteration: "Sakasete Misemasu! Otoko Usoppu Hachi Shaku Tama" (Japanese: 咲かせてみせます! 男ウソップ八尺玉)	Munehisa Sakai	Junki Takegami	Hideaki Maniwa	November 24, 2002	—
135	99	5	"Legend of the Pirate Hunter!" "The Fabled Pirate Hunter! Zoro, the Wandering Swordsman!"; Transliteration: "Uwasa no Kaizoku Gari! Sasurai no Kenshi Zoro" (Japanese: 噂の海賊狩り! さすらいの剣士ゾロ)	Junji Shimizu	Junki Takegami	Naoki Tate	December 1, 2002	August 4, 2007
The Zenny Pirate Crew Sortie!
136	—	6	"Zenny of the Island of Goats and the Pirate Ship in the Mountains!"; Transliteration: "Yagi no Shima no Zenii to Yama no Naka no Kaizoku Sen!" (Japanese: ヤギの島のゼニィと山の中の海賊船!)	Directed by : Jun'ichi Fujise; Storyboarded by : Kenji Yokoyama	Yoshiyuki Suga	Kazuya Hisada	December 8, 2002	—
137	—	7	"How's Tricks? The Designs of Zenny the Moneylender!"; Transliteration: "Mōkarimakka? Kanekashi Zenii no Yabō!" (Japanese: 儲かりまっか? 金貸しゼニィの野望!)	Yūji Endō	Yoshiyuki Suga	Kenji Yokoyama	December 15, 2002	—
138	—	8	"Whereabouts of the Island Treasure! Attack of the Zenny Pirates!"; Transliteration: "Shima no Otakara no Yukue! Zenii Kaizoku Dan Shutsugeki!" (Japanese: 島のお宝の行方! ゼニィ海賊団出撃!)	Yōko Ikeda	Yoshiyuki Suga	Takeo Ide	December 22, 2002	—
Beyond the Rainbow
139	100	9	"The Rainbow Mist" "Legend of the Rainbow Mist! Old Man Henzo of Luluka Island!"; Transliteration: "Nijiiro no Kiri Densetsu! Rurukajima no Rōjin Henzo" (Japanese: 虹色の霧伝説! ルルカ島の老人ヘンゾ)	Hidehiko Kadota	Ryōta Yamaguchi	Masayuki Takagi	January 5, 2003	August 11, 2007
140	101	10	"Wreckers Reef" "Residents of the Land of Eternity! The Pumpkin Pirates!"; Transliteration: "Eien no Kuni no Jūnin! Panpukin Kaizoku Dan!" (Japanese: 永遠の国の住人! パンプキン海賊団!)	Munehisa Sakai	Ryōta Yamaguchi	Hideaki Maniwa	January 12, 2003	August 25, 2007
141	102	11	"No Way Out" "Thoughts of Home! The Pirate Graveyard of No Escape!"; Transliteration: "Kokyū e no Omoi! Dasshutsu Funō no Kaizoku Hakaba!" (Japanese: 故郷への想い! 脱出不能の海賊墓場!)	Ken Koyama	Ryōta Yamaguchi	Naoki Tate	January 19, 2003	September 1, 2007
142	103	12	"Into The Mist" "An Inevitable Melee! Wetton's Schemes and the Rainbow Tower!"; Transliteration: "Ransen Hissu! Uetton no Yabō to Niji no Tō" (Japanese: 乱戦必死! ウエットンの野望と虹の塔)	Yūji Endō	Ryōta Yamaguchi	Kazuya Hisada	January 26, 2003	September 15, 2007
143	104	13	"The Great Escape!" "And so, the Legend Begins! To the Other Side of the Rainbow!"; Transliteration: "Soshite Densetsu ga Hajimaru! Iza Niji no Kanata e" (Japanese: そして伝説が始まる! いざ虹の彼方へ)	Directed by : Jun'ichi Fujise; Storyboarded by : Junji Shimizu	Ryōta Yamaguchi	Kenji Yokoyama	February 2, 2003	September 22, 2007

=== Season 6: Sky Island ~ Skypiea & The Golden Bell (2003–04) ===
Starting in Season 6, 4Kids dropped One Piece and the rights were picked up by Funimation. The episode numbers and titles were restored to their original Japanese versions with slight differences in situations where 4Kids terms (from the TV series and video games) were kept for the TV broadcast. Funimation did not continue the practice of combining or cutting episodes, though some edits to the content started by 4Kids were still kept for broadcast purposes.

The Australian broadcasts began airing uncut episodes starting with 175.

No. overall	No. in season	Title	Directed by	Written by	Original release date	English air date (Note: Episodes 168 through 195 did not air on television in the United States, but did air in Australia. These episodes were, however, released on DVD. For further information on DVD releases, please refer to the "Home Releases" section of this page.)
Jaya
144	1	"Caught Log! The King of Salvagers, Masira!"; Transliteration: "Ubawareta kiroku! Sarubēji ō Mashira!" (Japanese: 奪われた記録!サルベージ王マシラ!)	Hidehiko Kadota	Yoshiyuki Suga	February 9, 2003	September 29, 2007
145	2	"Monsters Appear! Don't Mess with the Whitebeard Pirates!"; Transliteration: "Kaibutsu tōjō! Shirohige Ichimi ni wa te o dasu na" (Japanese: 怪物登場!白ひげ一味には手を出すな)	Hiroyuki Kakudō	Yoshiyuki Suga	February 16, 2003	October 6, 2007
146	3	"Quit Dreaming! Mock Town, the Town of Ridicule!"; Transliteration: "Yume o miru na! Azakeri no machi Mokku Taun!" (Japanese: 夢を見るな!嘲りの街モックタウン!)	Yoko Ikeda	Yoshiyuki Suga	February 23, 2003 (Note: Aired as part of a special with episodes of other anime shows.)	October 13, 2007
147	4	"Distinguished Pirates! A Man Who Talks of Dreams and the King of Undersea Search!"; Transliteration: "Kaizoku no takami! Yume o kataru otoko to kaitei shinsaku ō" (Japanese: 海賊の高み!夢を語る男と海底探索王)	Directed by : Junichi Fujise; Storyboarded by : Munehisa Sakai	Yoshiyuki Suga	March 9, 2003	October 20, 2007
148	5	"Legendary Family! Noland, the Liar!"; Transliteration: "Densetsu no ichizoku! Usotsuki Nōrando" (Japanese: 伝説の一族!「うそつきノーランド」)	Junji Shimizu	Yoshiyuki Suga	March 16, 2003	October 27, 2007
149	6	"Steer for the Clouds! Capture the South Bird!"; Transliteration: "Kumo kaji ippai! Sausubādo o oe!" (Japanese: 雲舵いっぱい!サウスバードを追え!)	Yuji Endo	Yoshiyuki Suga	March 23, 2003	November 3, 2007
150	7	"Dreams Don't Come True?! Bellamy Versus the Saruyama Alliance!"; Transliteration: "Yume wa kanawanai!? Beramī VS saruyama rengō" (Japanese: 幻想は叶わない!?ベラミーVS猿山連合)	Hidehiko Kadota	Yoshiyuki Suga	April 13, 2003	November 10, 2007
151	8	"100 Million Man! World's Greatest Power and Pirate Black Beard!"; Transliteration: "Ichioku no otoko! Sekai saikō kenryoku to kaizoku kurohige" (Japanese: 一億の男!世界最高権力と海賊黒ひげ)	Ken Koyama	Yoshiyuki Suga	April 20, 2003	November 24, 2007
152	9	"Take to the Sky! Ride the Knockup Stream!"; Transliteration: "Fune wa sora o yuku! Tsukiageru kairyū ni nore" (Japanese: 船は空をゆく!突き上げる海流に乗れ)	Hiroyuki Kakudō	Michiru Shimada	April 27, 2003	December 1, 2007
Skypiea
153	10	"Sail the White Sea! The Sky Knight and the Gate in the Clouds!"; Transliteration: "Koko wa sora no umi! Sora no kishi to tengoku no mon" (Japanese: ここは空の海!空の騎士と天国の門)	Junji Shimizu	Michiru Shimada	May 4, 2003	December 8, 2007
154	11	"Godland, Skypiea! Angels on a Beach of Clouds!"; Transliteration: "Kami no kuni Sukaipia! Kumo no nagisa no tenshitachi" (Japanese: 神の国スカイピア!雲の渚の天使たち)	Yoko Ikeda	Ryōta Yamaguchi	May 11, 2003	December 15, 2007
155	12	"The Forbidden Sacred Ground! The Island Where God Lives and Heaven's Judgement!"; Transliteration: "Kindan no seichi! Kami no sumi shima to ten no sabaki!" (Japanese: 禁断の聖地!神の住む島と天の裁き!)	Hidehiko Kadota	Michiru Shimada	May 18, 2003	December 22, 2007
156	13	"Already Criminals?! Skypiea's Upholder of the Law!"; Transliteration: "Hayaku mo hanzaisha!? Sukaipia no hō no banjin" (Japanese: 早くも犯罪者!?スカイピアの法の番人)	Junichi Fujise	Yoshiyuki Suga	June 8, 2003	December 29, 2007
157	14	"Is Escape Possible?!? God's Challenge is Set in Motion"; Transliteration: "Dasshutsu naru ka!? Ugokihajimeta kami no shiren!" (Japanese: 脱出なるか!?動きはじめた神の試練!)	Ken Koyama	Junki Takegami	June 15, 2003	January 5, 2008
158	15	"A Trap on Lovely Street! The Almighty Eneru"; Transliteration: "Raburī dōri no wana! Zennō naru Goddo Eneru" (Japanese: ラブリー通りの罠!全能なる神エネル)	Hiroyuki Kakudō	Junki Takegami	June 22, 2003	January 12, 2008
159	16	"Onward Crow! To the Sacrificial Altar!"; Transliteration: "Susume Karasumaru! Ikenie no saidan o mezase" (Japanese: すすめカラス丸!生贄の祭壇を目指せ)	Junji Shimizu	Yoshiyuki Suga	July 6, 2003	January 19, 2008
160	17	"10% Survival Rate! Satori, the Mantra Master!"; Transliteration: "Seizonritsu 10%! Mantora tsukai no shinkan Satori" (Japanese: 生存率10%!心綱使いの神官サトリ!)	Hidehiko Kadota	Yoshiyuki Suga	July 13, 2003	January 26, 2008
161	18	"The Ordeal of Spheres! Desperate Struggle in the Lost Forest!"; Transliteration: "'Tama no shiren' no kyōi! Mayoi no mori no shitō" (Japanese: 「玉の試練」の脅威!迷いの森の死闘)	Katsumi Tokoro	Junki Takegami	July 20, 2003	February 2, 2008
162	19	"Chopper in Danger! Former God vs. Priest Shura!"; Transliteration: "Choppā ayaushi! Moto kami VS Shinkan Shura" (Japanese: チョッパー危うし!元神VS神官シュラ)	Munehisa Sakai	Junki Takegami	August 3, 2003	February 9, 2008
163	20	"Profound Mystery! Ordeal of String and Ordeal of Love?!?"; Transliteration: "Makafushigi! Himo no shiren to koi no shiren!?" (Japanese: 摩訶不思議!紐の試練と恋の試練!?)	Ken Koyama	Yoshiyuki Suga	August 10, 2003	February 16, 2008
164	21	"Light the Fire of Shandora! Wyper the Warrior!"; Transliteration: "Shandora no tō o nobose! Senshi Waipā" (Japanese: シャンドラの灯を燈せ!戦士ワイパー)	Kōnosuke Uda	Yoshiyuki Suga	August 17, 2003	February 23, 2008
165	22	"Jaya, City of Gold in the Sky! Head for God's Shrine!"; Transliteration: "Tenkū no ōgonkyō Jaya! Mezase kami no yashiro" (Japanese: 天空の黄金卿ジャヤ!目指せ神の社!)	Directed by : Junichi Fujise; Storyboarded by : Kenji Yokoyama	Junki Takegami	August 24, 2003	March 1, 2008
166	23	"Festival on the Night Before Gold-Hunting! Feelings for "Vearth!""; Transliteration: "ōgon zenya matsuri! Vāsu e no omoi!" (Japanese: 黄金前夜祭!「ヴァース」への想い!)	Yoko Ikeda	Junki Takegami	September 7, 2003	March 8, 2008
167	24	"Enter God Eneru! Farewell to the Survivors!"; Transliteration: "Goddo Eneru tōjō!! Ikinokori e no ōpādo" (Japanese: 神·エネル登場!!生き残りへの夜明曲)	Shigeyasu Yamauchi	Yoshiyuki Suga	September 21, 2003	March 15, 2008
168	25	"A Giant Snake Bares Its Fangs! The Survival Game Begins!"; Transliteration: "Kiba muku ōhebi! Tsui ni hajimaru sabaibaru gēmu" (Japanese: 牙むく大蛇!遂に始まる生き残り合戦)	Hiroyuki Kakudō	Yoshiyuki Suga	October 12, 2003	November 3, 2008
169	26	"The Deadly Reject! War Demon Wyper's Resolve!"; Transliteration: "Sutemi no haigeki! Senki Waipā no kakugo" (Japanese: 捨身の排撃!!「戦鬼」ワイパーの覚悟)	Munehisa Sakai	Junki Takegami	October 19, 2003	November 4, 2008
170	27	"Fierce Mid-Air Battle! Pirate Zoro vs. Warrior Braham!"; Transliteration: "Kūchū no gekisen! Kaizoku Zoro VS Senshi Burahamu" (Japanese: 空中の激戦!海賊ゾロVS戦士ブラハム)	Ken Koyama	Junki Takegami	October 19, 2003	November 5, 2008
171	28	"The Roaring Burn Bazooka!! Pirate Luffy vs. War Demon Wyper!"; Transliteration: "Unaru nenshōhō!! Rufi vs senki Waipā" (Japanese: 唸る燃焼砲!!ルフィVS戦鬼ワイパー闘)	Katsumi Tokoro	Yoshiyuki Suga	October 26, 2003	November 6, 2008
172	29	"The Ordeal of Swamp! Chopper vs Sky Punk Gedatsu!"; Transliteration: "Numa no shiren! Choppā VS Shinkan Gedatsu!!" (Japanese: 沼の試練!チョッパーVS神官ゲダツ!!)	Hidehiko Kadota	Yoshiyuki Suga	November 2, 2003	November 7, 2008
Sky Island ~ The Golden Bell
173	30	"Unbeatable Powers! Eneru's True Form is Revealed!"; Transliteration: "Muteki no nōryoku! Akasareru Eneru no shōtai" (Japanese: 無敵の能力!明かされるエネルの正体)	Kōnosuke Uda	Junki Takegami	November 9, 2003	November 10, 2008
174	31	"A Mystical City! The Grand Ruins of Shandora!"; Transliteration: "Maboroshi no to! Yūdai naru Shandora no iseki!!" (Japanese: 幻の都!雄大なるシャンドラの遺跡!!)	Directed by : Yoko Ikeda; Storyboarded by : Kenji Yokoyama	Junki Takegami	November 16, 2003	November 11, 2008
175	32	"0% Survival Rate! Chopper vs. Ohm, the Sword Wielding Priest!"; Transliteration: "Seisonritsu 0%!! Choppā VS shinkan Ōmu" (Japanese: 生存率0%!!チョッパーVS神官オーム)	Junichi Fujise	Junki Takegami	December 21, 2003	November 12, 2008
176	33	"Climb Giant Jack! Deadly Combat in the Upper Ruins!"; Transliteration: "Kyodai mame tsuru o nobore!! Jōsō iseki no shitō" (Japanese: 巨大豆蔓"を登れ!!上層遺跡の死闘)	Munehisa Sakai	Michiru Shimada	January 11, 2004	November 13, 2008
177	34	"The Ordeal of Iron! White Barbed Death Match!"; Transliteration: "Tetsu no shiren no shinkocchō! Shiroibara Desumacchi!!" (Japanese: 鉄の試練の真骨頂!白荊デスマッチ!!)	Ken Koyama	Michiru Shimada	January 18, 2004	November 14, 2008
178	35	"Bursting Slash! Zoro vs Ohm!"; Transliteration: "Hotobashiru Zangeki! Zoro VS shinkan Ōmu!!" (Japanese: ほとばしる斬撃!ゾロVS神官オーム!!)	Hidehiko Kadota	Michiru Shimada	January 25, 2004	November 17, 2008
179	36	"Collapsing Upper Ruins! The Quintet for the Finale!"; Transliteration: "Kuzure yuku jōsō iseki! Fināre e no kuintetto" (Japanese: 崩れゆく上層遺跡!終曲への五重奏!!)	Katsumi Tokoro	Michiru Shimada	February 1, 2004	November 18, 2008
180	37	"Showdown in the Ancient Ruins! Sky God Eneru's Goal!"; Transliteration: "Kodai iseki no taiketsu! Goddo Eneru no mokuteki" (Japanese: 古代遺跡の対決!神·エネルの目的)	Yukio Kaizawa	Junki Takegami	February 8, 2004	November 19, 2008
181	38	"Ambition Towards the Endless Vearth! The Ark Maxim!"; Transliteration: "Kagirinai daichi e no yabō hakobune Makushimu" (Japanese: 限りない大地への野望方舟マクシム!!)	Yoko Ikeda	Junki Takegami	February 15, 2004	November 20, 2008
182	39	"They Finally Clash! Pirate Luffy vs God Eneru!"; Transliteration: "Tsui ni gekitotsu! Kaizoku Rufi VS Goddo Eneru!!" (Japanese: 遂に激突!海賊ルフィVS神·エネル!!)	Kōnosuke Uda	Junki Takegami	February 22, 2004	November 21, 2008
183	40	"Maxim Surfaces! Deathpiea is Activated!"; Transliteration: "Makushimu ujō! Ugokihajimeta Desupia!!" (Japanese: マクシム浮上!動き始めたデスピア!!)	Takahiro Imamura	Michiru Shimada	February 29, 2004	November 24, 2008
184	41	"Luffy Falls! Eneru's Judgement and Nami's Wish!"; Transliteration: "Rufi rakuka! Kami no sabaki to Nami no nozomi!!" (Japanese: ルフィ落下!神の裁きとナミの望み!!)	Ken Koyama	Michiru Shimada	March 7, 2004	November 25, 2008
185	42	"The Two Awaken! On the Front Lines of the Burning Love Rescue!"; Transliteration: "Mesameta futari! Moeru koi no kyūshutsu zensen!!" (Japanese: 目覚めた二人!燃える恋の救出前線!!)	Munehisa Sakai	Michiru Shimada	March 14, 2004	November 26, 2008
186	43	"Capriccio for Despair! The Impending Doom of Sky Island!"; Transliteration: "Zetsubō e no kyōsōkyoku hakari kuru sorajima no shōmetsu!!" (Japanese: 絶望への狂想曲迫り来る空島の消滅!!)	Hidehiko Kadota	Hirohiko Kamisaka	March 21, 2004	November 27, 2008
187	44	"Led by a Bell's Sound! Tale of the Great Warrior and the Explorer!"; Transliteration: "Kane no oto no michibiki! Daisenshi to shinkenka no monogatari" (Japanese: 鐘の音の導き!大戦士と探検家の物語)	Hiroyuki Kakudō	Hirohiko Kamisaka	March 28, 2004	November 28, 2008
188	45	"Free From the Spell! The Great Warrior Sheds Tears!"; Transliteration: "Jubaku kara no kaihō! Daisenshi ga nagashita namida!!" (Japanese: 呪縛からの解放!大戦士が流した涙!!)	Takahiro Imamura	Hirohiko Kamisaka	March 28, 2004	December 30, 2008
189	46	"Eternal Friends! The Vowed Bell Echoes Across the Mighty Seas!"; Transliteration: "Eien no shinyū! Daikaigen ni hibiku chikai no kane" (Japanese: 永遠の親友!大海原に響く誓いの鐘)	Katsumi Tokoro	Hirohiko Kamisaka	April 4, 2004	December 31, 2008
190	47	"Angel Island, Obliterated! The Horror of The Raigo's Advent!!"; Transliteration: "Enjerushima shōmetsu! Raigō kōrin no kyōfu!" (Japanese: エンジェル島消滅!雷迎降臨の恐怖!!)	Ken Koyama	Hirohiko Kamisaka	April 25, 2004	January 2, 2009
191	48	"Knock Over Giant Jack! Last Hope for Escape!"; Transliteration: "Kyodai mame tsuru o taose! Dasshutsu e no saigō no nozomi" (Japanese: 巨大豆蔓を倒せ!脱出への最後の望み)	Yoko Ikeda	Hirohiko Kamisaka	May 2, 2004	January 5, 2009
192	49	"Miracle on Skypiea! The Love Song Heard in the Clouds!"; Transliteration: "Kami no kuni no kiseki! Tenshi ni todoita rabusongu" (Japanese: 神の国の奇跡!天使に届いた島の歌声)	Hidehiko Kadota	Hirohiko Kamisaka	May 9, 2004	January 6, 2009
193	50	"The Battle Ends! Proud Fantasia Echoes Far!"; Transliteration: "Tatakai no shūen! Tōku hibiku hokori takaki gensōkyoku" (Japanese: 戦いの終焉!遠く響く誇り高き幻想曲)	Hiroyuki Kakudō	Hirohiko Kamisaka	May 23, 2004	January 7, 2009
Post-Skypiea
194	51	"I Made it Here! The Yarn the Poneglyphs Spin!"; Transliteration: "Ware koko ni itaru! Rekishi no honbun ga tsumugu mono" (Japanese: 我ここに至る!歴史の本文が紡ぐもの)	Junichi Fujise	Hirohiko Kamisaka	June 6, 2004	January 8, 2009
195	52	"Off to the Blue Sea!! A Heartfelt Finale!"; Transliteration: "Iza seikai e!! Omoi ga shibarinasu saishū gakushō" (Japanese: いざ青海へ!!想いが織りなす最終楽章)	Munehisa Sakai	Hirohiko Kamisaka	June 13, 2004	January 9, 2009

=== Season 7: Escape! The Marine Fortress & The Foxy Pirate Crew (2004–05) ===
No. overall	No. in season	Title	Directed by	Written by	Original release date	English air date (Note: Episodes were initially released in English on DVD, but to correspond with the Japanese column, the air dates refer to their first English television airings on Adult Swim's Toonami programming block, unless otherwise noted. No dates are used for episodes 196 through 206 as they did not air on television in English. These episodes were, however, released on DVD. For further information on DVD releases, please refer to the "Home Releases" section of this page.)
G-8
196	1	"A State of Emergency is Issued! A Notorious Pirate Ship has Infiltrated!"; Transliteration: "Hijō Jitai Hatsumei! Akumei Takaki Kaizokusen Sennyū" (Japanese: 非常事態発令!悪名高き海賊船潜入!)	Takahiro Imamura	Hirohiko Kamisaka	June 20, 2004	—
197	2	"Sanji the Cook! Proving His Merit at the Marine Dining Hall!"; Transliteration: "Ryōrinin Sanji! Kaigun Shokudō de Shinka Hakki!" (Japanese: 料理人サンジ!海軍食堂で真価発揮!)	Ken Koyama	Michiru Shimada	July 4, 2004	—
198	3	"Captured Zoro! Chopper's Emergency Operations!"; Transliteration: "Towareta Zoro to Choppā Kinkyū Shittō" (Japanese: 囚われたゾロとチョッパー緊急執刀!)	Hiroyuki Kakudō	Junki Takegami	July 11, 2004	—
199	4	"The Marines Dragnet Closes In! The Second Member Captured!"; Transliteration: "Hakaru Kaigun no Sōsamō! Towareta Futarime!" (Japanese: 迫る海軍の捜査網!囚われた二人目!)	Mamoru Hosoda	Yoshiyuki Suga	July 18, 2004	—
200	5	"Luffy and Sanji's Daring Rescue Mission!"; Transliteration: "Kesshi no Rufi to Sanji! Kūshutsu Daisakusen!" (Japanese: 決死のルフィとサンジ!救出大作戦!)	Munehisa Sakai	Hirohiko Kamisaka	August 8, 2004	—
201	6	"Enter the Hot-Blooded Special Forces! Battle on the Bridge!"; Transliteration: "Netsuketsu Tokubetsu Butai Sansen! Burijji Kōbōsen!" (Japanese: 熱血特別部隊参戦!ブリッジ攻防戦!)	Hidehiko Kadota	Michiru Shimada	September 5, 2004	—
202	7	"Breaking Through the Siege! The Going Merry is Recovered!"; Transliteration: "Hōimō Toppa! Dakkan Gōingu Merī-gō" (Japanese: 包囲網突破!奪還ゴーイングメリー号)	Kōnosuke Uda	Yoshiyuki Suga	September 19, 2004	—
203	8	"The Pirate Ship Disappears! Fortress Battle, Round #2!"; Transliteration: "Kieta Kaizokusen! Yōsai Kōbō Dai 2 Raundo" (Japanese: 消えた海賊船!要塞攻防第2ラウンド)	Hiroyuki Kakudō	Junki Takegami	September 26, 2004	—
204	9	"The Gold and Waver Recovery Operations!"; Transliteration: "Ōgon Dakkan Sakusen to Ueibā Kaishū Sakusen!" (Japanese: 黄金奪還作戦とウエイバー回収作戦!)	Katsumi Tokoro	Hirohiko Kamisaka	October 3, 2004	—
205	10	"The One Fell Swoop Plan! Jonathan's Surefire Secret Tactic!"; Transliteration: "Ichimōdajin Keikaku! Jonasan Jishin no Hisaku!" (Japanese: 一網打尽計画!ジョナサン自信の秘策)	Ken Koyama	Yoshiyuki Suga	October 3, 2004	—
206	11	"Farewell, Marine Fortress! The Last Battle for Escape!"; Transliteration: "Saraba Kaigun Yōsai! Dasshutsu e no Saigō no Kōbō" (Japanese: さらば海軍要塞!脱出への最後の攻防)	Takahiro Imamura	Junki Takegami	October 10, 2004	—
Long Ring Long Land
207	12	"Great Adventure in Long Ring Long Land!"; Transliteration: "Rongu Ringu Rongu Rando no Daibōken!" (Japanese: ロングリングロングランドの大冒険!)	Directed by : Junichi Fujise; Storyboarded by : Kenji Yokoyama	Hirohiko Kamisaka	October 31, 2004	May 19, 2013
208	13	"A Davy Back with the Foxy Pirates!"; Transliteration: "Fokushī Kaizokudan to Dēbī Bakku!" (Japanese: フォクシー海賊団とデービーバック!)	Hiroyuki Kakudō	Hirohiko Kamisaka	November 7, 2004	May 26, 2013
209	14	"Round 1! One Lap of the Donut Race!"; Transliteration: "Dai Ikkaisen! Gururi Ishū Dōnatsu Rēsu" (Japanese: 第一回戦!ぐるり一周ドーナツレース)	Hidehiko Kadota	Hirohiko Kamisaka	November 14, 2004	June 2, 2013
210	15	"Silver Fox Foxy! The Merciless Interference!"; Transliteration: "Gin Gitsune no Fokushī! Mōretsu Bōgai Kōsei!" (Japanese: 銀ギツネのフォクシー!猛烈妨害攻勢)	Ken Koyama	Hirohiko Kamisaka	November 21, 2004	June 9, 2013
211	16	"Round 2! Shoot It into the Groggy Ring!"; Transliteration: "Dai Ni Kaisen! Buchikome Gurokkī Ringu!" (Japanese: 第二回戦!ブチ込めグロッキーリング)	Takahiro Imamura	Junki Takegami	November 28, 2004	June 16, 2013
212	17	"A Barrage of Red Cards in Groggy Ring!"; Transliteration: "Reddo Kādo Renpatsu! Gurokkī Ringu" (Japanese: レッドカード連発!グロッキーリング)	Katsumi Tokoro	Junki Takegami	December 5, 2004	June 23, 2013
213	18	"Round 3! The Round-and-Round Roller Race!"; Transliteration: "Daisan Kaisen! Guruguru Rōrā Rēsu!" (Japanese: 第三回戦!ぐるぐるローラーレース!)	Munehisa Sakai	Hirohiko Kamisaka	December 12, 2004	June 30, 2013
214	19	"A Seriously Heated Race! Into the Final Round!"; Transliteration: "Hakunetsu Bakusō Rēsu! Saishū Raundo Totsunyū" (Japanese: 白熱爆走レース!最終ラウンド突入!)	Hiroyuki Kakudō	Hirohiko Kamisaka	December 19, 2004	July 7, 2013
215	20	"Screaming-Hot Bombardment! Pirate Dodgeball!"; Transliteration: "Unaru Netsukyū Gōkyu! Kaizoku Dojjibōru!" (Japanese: うなる熱球剛球! 海賊ドッジボール!)	Ken Koyama	Hirohiko Kamisaka	January 9, 2005	July 14, 2013
216	21	"Showdown on the Cliff! Red Light, Green Light!"; Transliteration: "Dangai no Kessen! Daruma-san ga Koronda!" (Japanese: 断崖の決戦!だるまさんがころんだ!)	Hidehiko Kadota	Yoshiyuki Suga	January 9, 2005	July 21, 2013
217	22	"The Captains Square Off! The Final Combat Round!"; Transliteration: "Kyaputen Taiketsu! Saishūsen Konbatto!" (Japanese: キャプテン対決!最終戦コンバット!)	Yoko Ikeda	Hirohiko Kamisaka	January 16, 2005	July 28, 2013
218	23	"Full-Blast Slow-Slow Onslaught Vs. Invulnerable Luffy!"; Transliteration: "Zenkai Noro Noro Kōgeki vs Fujimi no Rufi" (Japanese: 全開ノロノロ攻撃VS不死身のルフィ)	Hiroyuki Kakudō	Hirohiko Kamisaka	January 23, 2005	August 4, 2013
219	24	"Epic, Heated Combat! The Fateful Final Conclusion!"; Transliteration: "Sōzetsu Nettō Konbatto! Unmei no Saishū Ketchaku!" (Japanese: 壮絶熱闘コンバット!運命の最終決着)	Takahiro Imamura	Hirohiko Kamisaka	January 30, 2005	August 11, 2013
Ocean's Dream
220	25	"Was It Lost? Stolen? Who Are You?"; Transliteration: "Ushinatta? Ubawareta? Omae wa Dare da?" (Japanese: 失った?奪われた?おまえはだれだ?)	Munehisa Sakai	Junki Takegami	February 6, 2005	August 18, 2013
221	26	"A Mysterious Boy With a Horn and Robin's Deduction!"; Transliteration: "Fude o Daita Nazo no Shōnen to Robin no Suiri!" (Japanese: 笛を抱いた謎の少年とロビンの推理!)	Katsumi Tokoro	Hirohiko Kamisaka	February 13, 2005	August 25, 2013
222	27	"Now, Let's Get Back Our Memories! The Pirate Crew Lands On the Island!"; Transliteration: "Iza Kioku o Dakkan seyo! Kaizokudan Shima ni Jōriku" (Japanese: いざ記憶を奪還せよ!海賊団島に上陸)	Ken Koyama	Yoshiyuki Suga	February 20, 2005	September 8, 2013
223	28	"Zoro Bares His Fangs! A Savage Animal Stands in the Way!"; Transliteration: "Kiba o Muku Zoro! Tachihadakatta Yajū" (Japanese: 牙をむくゾロ!立ちはだかった野獣!)	Hidehiko Kadota	Junki Takegami	February 27, 2005	September 15, 2013
224	29	"The Last Counterattack by the Memory Thief Who Reveals His True Colors!"; Transliteration: "Honsei o Arawashita Kioku Dorobō no Saigo no Gyakushū" (Japanese: 本性を現した記憶泥棒の最後の逆襲!)	Takahiro Imamura	Hirohiko Kamisaka	March 6, 2005	September 22, 2013
Foxy's Return
225	30	"Proud Man! Silver Fox Foxy!"; Transliteration: "Hokori Takaki Otoko! Gin Gitsune no Fokushī" (Japanese: 誇り高き男!銀ギツネのフォクシー)	Yoko Ikeda	Yoshiyuki Suga	March 13, 2005	September 29, 2013
226	31	"The Guy Who's the Closest to Invincible? And the Most Dangerous Man!"; Transliteration: "Mottomo Muteki ni Chikai Yatsu? To Mottomo Kiken na Otoko!" (Japanese: 最も無敵に近い奴?と最も危険な男!)	Directed by : Katsumi Tokoro; Storyboarded by : Eisaku Inoue	Yoshiyuki Suga	March 20, 2005	October 6, 2013
227	32	"Navy Headquarters Admiral Aokiji! The Ferocity of an Ultimate Powerhouse!"; Transliteration: "Kaigun Hombu Taishō Aokiji! Saikō Senryoku no Kyōi" (Japanese: 海軍本部大将青キジ!最高戦力の脅威)	Directed by : Hidehiko Kadota; Storyboarded by : Kenji Yokoyama	Yoshiyuki Suga	March 27, 2005	October 13, 2013
228	33	"Duel Between Rubber and Ice! Luffy vs. Aokiji!"; Transliteration: "Gomu to Koori no Ikkiuchi! Rufi VS Aokiji!" (Japanese: ゴムと氷の一騎打ち!ルフィVS青キジ)	Directed by : Yoko Ikeda; Storyboarded by : Eisaku Inoue	Hirohiko Kamisaka	March 27, 2005	October 20, 2013

=== Season 8: Water Seven (2005–06) ===
No. overall	No. in season	Title	Directed by	Written by	Original release date	English air date (Note: Episodes were initially released in English on DVD, but to correspond with the Japanese column, the air dates refer to their first English television airings on Adult Swim's Toonami programming block. For information on DVD releases, please refer to the "Home Releases" section of this page.)
Water 7
229	1	"The Dashing Sea Train and the City of Water: Water Seven!"; Transliteration: "Shissō umi ressha to mizu no miyako Uōtā Seven" (Japanese: 疾走海列車と水の都ウォーターセブン)	Directed by : Munehisa Sakai; Storyboarded by : Kenji Yokoyama	Hirohiko Kamisaka	April 17, 2005	October 27, 2013
230	2	"Adventure in the City on the Water! Head to the Mammoth Shipbuilding Plant!"; Transliteration: "Suijō toshi no bōken! Mezase kyodai sōsen kōjō" (Japanese: 水上都市の冒険!目指せ巨大造船工場)	Directed by : Kōnosuke Uda; Storyboarded by : Takahiro Imamura	Hirohiko Kamisaka	April 24, 2005	November 3, 2013
231	3	"The Franky Family and Iceberg!"; Transliteration: "Furankī ikka to Aisubāgu-san" (Japanese: フランキー一家とアイスバーグさん)	Yoshio Mukainakano	Hirohiko Kamisaka	May 1, 2005	November 10, 2013
232	4	"Galley-La Company! A Grand Sight: Dock #1!"; Transliteration: "Garēra Kanpanī! Soukan ichiban Dokku" (Japanese: ガレーラカンパニー!壮観一番ドック)	Directed by : Kōnosuke Uda; Storyboarded by : Ken Koyama	Hirohiko Kamisaka	May 15, 2005	November 17, 2013
233	5	"Pirate Abduction Incident! A Pirate Ship That Can Only Await Her End!"; Transliteration: "Kaizoku yūkai jiken to shi o matsu dake no kaizokusen" (Japanese: 海賊誘拐事件と死を待つだけの海賊船)	Directed by : Hiroaki Miyamoto; Storyboarded by : Kenji Yokoyama	Hirohiko Kamisaka	May 22, 2005	November 24, 2013
234	6	"Rescuing Our Friend! Raid On the Franky House!"; Transliteration: "Nakama kyūshutsu! Nagarikomi Furankī Hausu" (Japanese: 仲間救出!殴りこみフランキーハウス)	Hidehiko Kadota	Hirohiko Kamisaka	June 5, 2005	December 1, 2013
235	7	"Big Fight Under the Moon! The Pirate Flag Flutters With Sorrow!"; Transliteration: "Gekka no dai kenka! Kanashimi ni hirugaeru kaizoku hata!" (Japanese: 月下の大喧嘩!哀しみに翻る海賊旗!)	Katsumi Tokoro	Hirohiko Kamisaka	June 12, 2005	January 5, 2014
236	8	"Luffy vs. Usopp! Collision of Two Men's Pride!"; Transliteration: "Rufi VS Usoppu! Butsukaru otoko no iji" (Japanese: ルフィvsウソップ!ぶつかる男の意地)	Munehisa Sakai	Hirohiko Kamisaka	June 19, 2005	January 12, 2014
237	9	"Severe Shock Hits the City of Water! Iceberg Targeted!"; Transliteration: "Gekishin mizu no miyako! Newareta Aisubāgu" (Japanese: 激震水の都!狙われたアイスバーグ)	Yoko Ikeda	Hirohiko Kamisaka	July 3, 2005	January 19, 2014
238	10	"Gum-Gum Human vs. Fire-Breathing Cyborg!"; Transliteration: "Gomugomu ningen VS hi o fuku kaizō ningen" (Japanese: ゴムゴム人間VS火を吹く改造人間)	Yoshio Mukainakano	Hirohiko Kamisaka	July 10, 2005	January 26, 2014
239	11	"The Straw Hat Pirates Are the Culprits? The Protectors of the City of Water!"; Transliteration: "Hannin wa mugiwara kaizokudan? Mizu no miyako no yōjinbo" (Japanese: 犯人は麦わら海賊団?水の都の用心棒)	Morio Hatano	Hirohiko Kamisaka	July 31, 2005	February 2, 2014
240	12	"Eternal Farewell? Nico Robin: The Woman Who Draws Darkness!"; Transliteration: "Eien no wakare? Yami o hiku onna Niko Robin" (Japanese: 永遠の別れ?闇を引く女ニコ·ロビン)	Hiroaki Miyamoto	Hirohiko Kamisaka	August 7, 2005	February 9, 2014
241	13	"Capture Robin! The Determination of the Straw Hats!"; Transliteration: "Robin o tsukamaero! Mugiwara ichimi no ketsui" (Japanese: ロビンを捕まえろ!麦わら一味の決意)	Hidehiko Kadota	Hirohiko Kamisaka	August 14, 2005	February 16, 2014
242	14	"Cannon Fire Is the Signal! CP9 Goes Into Action!"; Transliteration: "Aizu wa hōgeki to tomo ni! Ugokidashita CP9" (Japanese: 合図は砲撃と共に!動き出したCP9)	Katsumi Tokoro	Hirohiko Kamisaka	August 21, 2005	February 23, 2014
243	15	"CP9 Takes Off Their Masks! Their Shocking True Faces!"; Transliteration: "Kamen o totta CP9! Sono odoroki no sugao" (Japanese: 仮面を取ったCP9!その驚きの素顔)	Kōnosuke Uda	Hirohiko Kamisaka	September 4, 2005	March 2, 2014
244	16	"Secret Bond! Iceberg and Franky!"; Transliteration: "Hisometa kizuna! Aisubāgu to Furankī" (Japanese: 秘めた絆!アイスバーグとフランキー)	Munehisa Sakai	Hirohiko Kamisaka	September 11, 2005	March 9, 2014
245	17	"Come Back, Robin! Showdown With CP9!"; Transliteration: "Kaette koi Robin! CP9 to no taiketsu!" (Japanese: 帰って来いロビン!CP9との対決!)	Hidehiko Kadota	Hirohiko Kamisaka	September 18, 2005	March 16, 2014
246	18	"The Straw Hat Pirates Annihilated? The Menace of the Leopard Model!"; Transliteration: "Mugiwara kaizokudan zenmetsu? Moderu hyō no kyōi" (Japanese: 麦わら海賊団全滅?モデル豹の脅威!)	Yoko Ikeda	Hirohiko Kamisaka	October 23, 2005 (Note: Episode 246 aired as part of a special alongside episodes of Sazae-san and Chibi Maruko-chan.)	March 23, 2014
247	19	"The Man Who Is Loved Even by His Ship! Usopp's Tears!"; Transliteration: "Fune kara mo aisareta otoko! Usoppu no namida!" (Japanese: 船からも愛された男!ウソップの涙!)	Morio Hatano	Hirohiko Kamisaka	October 30, 2005	March 30, 2014
248	20	"Franky's Past! The Day the Sea Train First Ran!"; Transliteration: "Furankī no kako! Umi ressha ga hashitta hi" (Japanese: フランキーの過去!海列車が走った日)	Hiroaki Miyamoto	Hirohiko Kamisaka	November 6, 2005	April 6, 2014
249	21	"Spandam's Scheme! The Day the Sea Train Shook!"; Transliteration: "Supandamu no inbō! Umi ressha ga ureta hi" (Japanese: スパンダムの陰謀!海列車が揺れた日)	Katsumi Tokoro	Hirohiko Kamisaka	November 13, 2005	April 13, 2014
250	22	"The End of the Legendary Man! The Day the Sea Train Cried!"; Transliteration: "Densetsu no otoko no saigo! Umi ressha ga naita hi" (Japanese: 伝説の男の最期!海列車が泣いた日)	Ken Koyama	Hirohiko Kamisaka	November 27, 2005 (Note: The episodes 250 and 251 aired together as a one-hour special.)	April 20, 2014
251	23	"The Truth Behind Her Betrayal! Robin's Sorrowful Decision!"; Transliteration: "Uragiri no shinsō! Robin no kanashiki ketsui!" (Japanese: 裏切りの真相!ロビンの哀しき決意!)	Munehisa Sakai	Hirohiko Kamisaka	November 27, 2005	April 27, 2014
252	24	"The Steam Whistle Forces Friends Apart! The Sea Train Starts to Run!"; Transliteration: "Nakama o hikihanasu kiteki! Hashiridasu umi ressha" (Japanese: 仲間を引き離す汽笛!走り出す海列車)	Directed by : Yukihiko Nakao; Storyboarded by : Kenji Yokoyama	Hirohiko Kamisaka	December 4, 2005	May 4, 2014
253	25	"Sanji Barges In! Sea Train Battle in the Storm!"; Transliteration: "Sanji totsunyū! arashi no naka no umi ressha batoru!" (Japanese: サンジ突入!嵐の中の海列車バトル!)	Yoko Ikeda	Hirohiko Kamisaka	December 11, 2005	May 11, 2014
254	26	"Nami's Soul Cries Out! Straw Hat Luffy Makes a Comeback!"; Transliteration: "Nami tamashii no sakebi! Mugiwara no Rufi fukukatsu!" (Japanese: ナミ魂の叫び!麦わらのルフィ復活!)	Morio Hatano	Hirohiko Kamisaka	January 22, 2006	May 18, 2014
255	27	"Another Sea Train? Rocketman Charges Forth!"; Transliteration: "Mō hitotsu no umi ressha? Rokettoman shutsugeki" (Japanese: もう一つの海列車?ロケットマン出撃)	Ken Koyama	Hirohiko Kamisaka	January 29, 2006	May 25, 2014
256	28	"Rescue Our Friends! A Bond Among Foes Sworn with Fists!"; Transliteration: "Nakama o sukue! Kobushi ni chikatta teki dōshi no kizuna!" (Japanese: 仲間を救え!拳に誓った敵同士の絆!)	Hiroaki Miyamoto	Hirohiko Kamisaka	February 5, 2006	June 1, 2014
257	29	"Smash the Wave! Luffy and Zoro Use the Strongest Combo!"; Transliteration: "Nami o sake! Rufi to Zoro no saikyō gattai waza" (Japanese: 波を砕け!ルフィとゾロの最強合体技)	Yukihiko Nakao	Hirohiko Kamisaka	February 26, 2006	June 8, 2014
258	30	"A Mysterious Man Appears?! His Name Is Sniperking!"; Transliteration: "Nazo no otoko tōjō!? Sono na wa Sogekingu!" (Japanese: 謎の男登場!?その名はそげキング!)	Munehisa Sakai	Hirohiko Kamisaka	March 5, 2006	June 15, 2014
259	31	"Showdown Between Cooks! Sanji vs. Ramen Kenpo"; Transliteration: "Kokku taiketsu! Sanji VS Rāmen kenpō" (Japanese: コック対決!サンジVSラーメン拳法)	Ken Koyama	Hirohiko Kamisaka	March 12, 2006	June 22, 2014
260	32	"Rooftop Duel! Franky vs. Nero"; Transliteration: "yane no ue no kettō! Furankī VS Nero" (Japanese: 屋根の上の決闘!フランキーVSネロ)	Yoko Ikeda	Hirohiko Kamisaka	March 19, 2006	June 29, 2014
261	33	"Clash! Demon-Slasher Zoro vs. Ship-Slasher T-Bone!"; Transliteration: "Gekitotsu! Onigiri Zoro VS funegiri T Bōn" (Japanese: 激突!鬼斬りゾロVS船斬りTボーン)	Directed by : Morio Hatano; Storyboarded by : Makiko Orimoto	Hirohiko Kamisaka	April 2, 2006 (Note: Episode 261 aired as part of a special alongside episodes of Sazae-san, Chibi Maruko-chan, and Kochikame.)	July 6, 2014
262	34	"Scramble over Robin! A Cunning Plan by Sniperking!!"; Transliteration: "Robin sōdatsusen! Sogekingu no kisaku!!" (Japanese: ロビン争奪戦!そげキングの奇策!!)	Yukihiko Nakao	Hirohiko Kamisaka	April 16, 2006	July 13, 2014
263	35	"The Judicial Island! Full View of Enies Lobby!"; Transliteration: "Shihō no shima! Eniesu Robī no zenbō" (Japanese: 司法の島!エニエス·ロビーの全貌!)	Hiroaki Miyamoto	Hirohiko Kamisaka	April 30, 2006	July 20, 2014

== OVAs ==
No.	Title	Directed by	Written by	Animation directed by	Original release date
1	"Defeat! Gyanzack the Pirate!" (Note: Alternatively translated as "Defeat Them! The Ganzak Pirates".); Transliteration: "Taose! Kaizoku Gyanzakku" (Japanese: 倒せ!海賊ギャンザック)	Gorō Taniguchi	Hiroaki Kitajima	Hisashi Kagawa & Tatsufumi Itō	July 26, 1998
Whilst running low on food supplies, Luffy, Zoro and Nami are suddenly attacked by a strange sea creature who destroys their boat and captures Nami. Washing up on a nearby island, Luffy and Zoro meet a girl named Medaka, learning from her grandfather that her father, along with many others in the islands village, have been captured by the pirate Gyanzack, who is forcing them to build a huge cannon. With the incentive of food, Luffy and Zoro attack Gyanzack's hideout, only to wind up captured. However, their attempts inspire the villagers to fight back, allowing Nami to spring Luffy and Zoro free. Gyanzack soon attempts to flee on his ship, using his new cannon to bomb the island, but the combined efforts of Luffy, Zoro, Nami and Medaka put a stop to his plan. Note: This OVA was produced by Production I.G and features a different voice cast from the television series.

== Releases ==
=== Japanese ===
==== VHS ====
Avex Pictures (Japan, VHS)
Volume		Episodes	Release date	Ref.
VHS ONEPIECE	piece1	1–4	February 21, 2001	
VHS ONEPIECE	piece2	5–8	February 21, 2001	
VHS ONEPIECE	piece3	9–12	March 21, 2001	
VHS ONEPIECE	piece4	13–16	April 18, 2001	
VHS ONEPIECE	piece5	17–20	May 23, 2001	
VHS ONEPIECE	piece6	21–24	June 20, 2001	
VHS ONEPIECE	piece7	25–28	July 18, 2001	
VHS ONEPIECE	piece8	29–32	August 22, 2001	
VHS ONEPIECE	piece9	33–36	September 19, 2001	
VHS ONEPIECE	piece10	37–40	October 24, 2001	
VHS ONEPIECE	piece11	41–44	November 21, 2001	
VHS ONEPIECE	piece12	45–48	December 19, 2001	
VHS ONEPIECE	piece13	49–52	January 17, 2002	
VHS ONEPIECE	piece14	53–56	February 14, 2002	
VHS ONEPIECE	piece15	57–61	March 20, 2002	
グランドライン突入篇	piece1	62–64	April 3, 2002	
グランドライン突入篇	piece2	65–67	May 2, 2002	
グランドライン突入篇	piece3	68–70	June 5, 2002	
グランドライン突入篇	piece4	71–73	July 3, 2002	
グランドライン突入篇	piece5	74–77	August 7, 2002	
チョッパー登場冬島篇	piece1	78–80	September 4, 2002	
チョッパー登場冬島篇	piece2	81–83	October 2, 2002	
チョッパー登場冬島篇	piece3	84–86	November 7, 2002	
チョッパー登場冬島篇	piece4	87–89	December 4, 2002	
チョッパー登場冬島篇	piece5	90–92	January 8, 2003	

==== DVD ====
Avex Pictures (Japan, Region 2 DVD)
Volume		Episodes	Release date	Ref.
ONE PIECE ワンピース	piece.01	1–4	February 21, 2001	
ONE PIECE ワンピース	piece.02	5–8	February 21, 2001	
ONE PIECE ワンピース	piece.03	9–12	March 22, 2001	
ONE PIECE ワンピース	piece.04	13–16	April 18, 2001	
ONE PIECE ワンピース	piece.05	17–20	May 23, 2001	
ONE PIECE ワンピース	piece.06	21–24	June 20, 2001	
ONE PIECE ワンピース	piece.07	25–28	July 18, 2001	
ONE PIECE ワンピース	piece.08	29–32	August 22, 2001	
ONE PIECE ワンピース	piece.09	33–36	September 19, 2001	
ONE PIECE ワンピース	piece.10	37–40	October 24, 2001	
ONE PIECE ワンピース	piece.11	41–44	November 21, 2001	
ONE PIECE ワンピース	piece.12	45–48	December 19, 2001	
ONE PIECE ワンピース	piece.13	49–52	January 17, 2002	
ONE PIECE ワンピース	piece.14	53–56	February 14, 2002	
ONE PIECE ワンピース	piece.15	57–61	March 20, 2002	
2ndシーズン グランドライン突入篇	piece.01	62–64	April 3, 2002	
2ndシーズン グランドライン突入篇	piece.02	65–67	May 2, 2002	
2ndシーズン グランドライン突入篇	piece.03	68–70	June 5, 2002	
2ndシーズン グランドライン突入篇	piece.04	71–73	July 3, 2002	
2ndシーズン グランドライン突入篇	piece.05	74–76	August 7, 2002	
3rdシーズン チョッパー登場 冬島篇	piece.01	77–79	September 4, 2002	
3rdシーズン チョッパー登場 冬島篇	piece.02	80–82	October 2, 2002	
3rdシーズン チョッパー登場 冬島篇	piece.03	83–85	November 7, 2002	
3rdシーズン チョッパー登場 冬島篇	piece.04	86–88	December 4, 2002	
3rdシーズン チョッパー登場 冬島篇	piece.05	89–91	January 8, 2003	
4thシーズン アラバスタ上陸篇	Piece.01	92–94	February 5, 2003	
4thシーズン アラバスタ上陸篇	Piece.02	95–97	March 5, 2003	
4thシーズン アラバスタ上陸篇	Piece.03	98–100	April 2, 2003	
4thシーズン アラバスタ上陸篇	Piece.04	101–103	May 8, 2003	
4thシーズン アラバスタ上陸篇	Piece.05	104–106	June 4, 2003	
4thシーズン アラバスタ上陸篇	Piece.06	107–109	July 2, 2003	
4thシーズン アラバスタ激闘篇	piece.01	110–112	August 6, 2003	
4thシーズン アラバスタ激闘篇	piece.02	113–115	September 3, 2003	
4thシーズン アラバスタ激闘篇	piece.03	116–118	October 1, 2003	
4thシーズン アラバスタ激闘篇	piece.04	119–121	November 6, 2003	
4thシーズン アラバスタ激闘篇	piece.05	122–124	December 3, 2003	
4thシーズン アラバスタ激闘篇	piece.06	125–127	January 7, 2004	
4thシーズン アラバスタ激闘篇	piece.07	128–130	February 4, 2004	
5thシーズン ドリームス!前篇	piece.01 『Dreams！』前編	131–132	March 3, 2004	
5thシーズン ドリームス!前篇	piece.02 『Dreams！』後編	133–135	April 7, 2004	
5thシーズン ドリームス!前篇	piece.03 『出撃ゼニィ海賊団』編	136–138	May 12, 2004	
5thシーズン ドリームス!前篇	piece.04 『虹の彼方へ』前編	139–140	June 2, 2004	
5thシーズン ドリームス!前篇	piece.05 『虹の彼方へ』後編	141–143	July 7, 2004	
6thシーズン 空島·スカイピア篇	piece.01	144–146	August 4, 2004	
6thシーズン 空島·スカイピア篇	piece.02	147–149	September 1, 2004	
6thシーズン 空島·スカイピア篇	piece.03	150–152	October 6, 2004	
6thシーズン 空島·スカイピア篇	piece.04	153–155	November 3, 2004	
6thシーズン 空島·スカイピア篇	piece.05	156–158	December 1, 2004	
6thシーズン 空島·スカイピア篇	piece.06	159–161	January 13, 2005	
6thシーズン 空島·スカイピア篇	piece.07	162–164	February 2, 2005	
6thシーズン 空島·スカイピア篇	piece.08	165–167	March 3, 2005	
6thシーズン 空島·スカイピア篇	piece.09	168–170	April 6, 2005	
6thシーズン 空島·スカイピア篇	piece.10	171–173	May 11, 2005	
6thシーズン 空島·黄金の鐘篇	piece.01	174–176	June 1, 2005	
6thシーズン 空島·黄金の鐘篇	piece.02	177–179	July 6, 2005	
6thシーズン 空島·黄金の鐘篇	piece.03	180–182	August 3, 2005	
6thシーズン 空島·黄金の鐘篇	piece.04	183–185	September 7, 2005	
6thシーズン 空島·黄金の鐘篇	piece.05	186–188	October 5, 2005	
6thシーズン 空島·黄金の鐘篇	piece.06	189–191	November 2, 2005	
6thシーズン 空島·黄金の鐘篇	piece.07	192–193	December 7, 2005	
6thシーズン 空島·黄金の鐘篇	piece.08	194–195	January 11, 2006	
7thシーズン 脱出!海軍要塞&フォクシー篇	piece.01	196–198	February 1, 2006	
7thシーズン 脱出!海軍要塞&フォクシー篇	piece.02	199–201	March 1, 2006	
7thシーズン 脱出!海軍要塞&フォクシー篇	piece.03	202–204	April 5, 2006	
7thシーズン 脱出!海軍要塞&フォクシー篇	piece.04	205–207	May 3, 2006	
7thシーズン 脱出!海軍要塞&フォクシー篇	piece.05	208–210	June 7, 2006	
7thシーズン 脱出!海軍要塞&フォクシー篇	piece.06	211–213	July 5, 2006	
7thシーズン 脱出!海軍要塞&フォクシー篇	piece.07	214–216	August 2, 2006	
7thシーズン 脱出!海軍要塞&フォクシー篇	piece.08	217–219	September 6, 2006	
7thシーズン 脱出!海軍要塞&フォクシー篇	piece.09	220–222	October 11, 2006	
7thシーズン 脱出!海軍要塞&フォクシー篇	piece.10	223–225	November 8, 2006	
7thシーズン 脱出!海軍要塞&フォクシー篇	piece.11	226–228	December 6, 2006	
8thシーズン ウォーターセブン篇	piece.01	229–231	January 10, 2007	
8thシーズン ウォーターセブン篇	piece.02	232–234	February 7, 2007	
8thシーズン ウォーターセブン篇	piece.03	235–237	March 7, 2007	
8thシーズン ウォーターセブン篇	piece.04	238–240	April 11, 2007	
8thシーズン ウォーターセブン篇	piece.05	241–243	May 9, 2007	
8thシーズン ウォーターセブン篇	piece.06	244–246	June 6, 2007	
8thシーズン ウォーターセブン篇	piece.07	247–249	July 11, 2007	
8thシーズン ウォーターセブン篇	piece.08	250–252	August 1, 2007	
8thシーズン ウォーターセブン篇	piece.09	253–255	September 5, 2007	
8thシーズン ウォーターセブン篇	piece.10	256–258	October 10, 2007	
8thシーズン ウォーターセブン篇	piece.11	259–261	November 7, 2007	
8thシーズン ウォーターセブン篇	piece.12	262–263	December 5, 2007	
ワンピースTV主題歌集DVD		– (Note: A 19 minute compilation of the series' theme music.)	March 17, 2004	
ROMANCE DAWN		1, 907	January 24, 2020	
ONE PIECE Log Collection	"EAST BLUE"	1–17	July 23, 2010	
ONE PIECE Log Collection	"SANJI"	18–30	July 23, 2010	
ONE PIECE Log Collection	"NAMI"	31–44	August 27, 2010	
ONE PIECE Log Collection	"LOGUE TOWN"	45–61	August 27, 2010	
ONE PIECE Log Collection	"GRAND LINE"	62–77	December 22, 2010	
ONE PIECE Log Collection	"CHOPPER"	78–92	December 22, 2010	
ONE PIECE Log Collection	"ARABASTA"	93–110	January 28, 2011	
ONE PIECE Log Collection	"VIVI"	111–130	January 28, 2011	
ONE PIECE Log Collection	"SKYPIEA"	144–159	June 24, 2011	
ONE PIECE Log Collection	"GOD"	160–179	July 22, 2011	
ONE PIECE Log Collection	"BELL"	180–195	August 26, 2011	
ONE PIECE Log Collection	"NAVARON"	196–206	August 26, 2011	
ONE PIECE Log Collection	"FOXY"	207–228	December 21, 2011	
ONE PIECE Log Collection	"WATER SEVEN"	229–247	December 21, 2011	
ONE PIECE Log Collection	"ROCKET MAN"	248–263	January 27, 2012	
ONE PIECE Log Collection SET	EAST BLUE to CHOPPER	1–92	March 27, 2015	

==== Blu-ray ====
The Eternal Log releases contain 16:9 versions of the episodes in standard definition Blu-ray format.

Toei Animation (Japan, Region A BD)
Volume		Episodes	Release date	Ref.
ONE PIECE Eternal Log	EAST BLUE	1–61	January 22, 2021	
ONE PIECE Eternal Log	ALABASTA	62–130	July 23, 2021	
ONE PIECE Eternal Log	SKYPIEA	144–228	January 28, 2022	

=== English ===
==== 4Kids ====
4Kids Entertainment Edited TV Version: Viz Media (USA, Region 1), Madman Entertainment (Australia, Region 4)
Volume		Episodes	Release date		ISBN	Ref.
Volume		Episodes	USA	Australia	ISBN	Ref.
1	King of the Pirates	1–3	February 28, 2006	May 17, 2006	ISBN 1-59861-000-7	
2	The Circus Comes to Town	4–6	April 25, 2006	July 26, 2006	ISBN 1-59861-001-5	
3	The Teller of Tales	7–11	June 27, 2006	September 6, 2006	ISBN 1-59861-002-3	
4	The Cat's Ninth Life	12–16	August 29, 2006	November 8, 2006	ISBN 1-59861-003-1	
5	King of the Busboys	17–21	October 24, 2006	January 24, 2007	ISBN 1-59861-004-X	
6	The Better Swordsman	22–26	December 26, 2006	March 14, 2007	ISBN 1-59861-005-8	
7	New Crew	27–31	February 27, 2007	May 2, 2007	ISBN 1-59861-006-6	
8	Belle Of The Brawl	32–36	April 24, 2007	July 18, 2007	ISBN 1-59861-007-4	
9	Rogue Town	37–41	June 26, 2007	September 12, 2007	ISBN 1-59861-008-2	
10	Baroque Works	42–46	August 28, 2007	November 7, 2007	ISBN 1-59861-009-0	
11	Tony Tony Chopper	47–52	October 30, 2007	January 23, 2008	ISBN 1-59861-010-4	
1-3	Starter Pack	1–11	N/A	March 14, 2007	ISBN N/A	

==== Uncut ====
In Australia, the Season sets were named Collection 1 through 21 and the Collection Boxes were named Treasure Chest Collections. In North America, the 2015 Collection Boxes are exclusive to Amazon and packaged with art cards, stickers and a poster; the 2019 release of Box One, renamed 20th Anniversary Pirate Collection, is exclusive to Walmart and bundled with a t-shirt.

Uncut English & Japanese versions: Funimation Entertainment (USA, Region 1), Manga Entertainment (UK, Region 2), Madman Entertainment (Australia, Region 4)
Volume		Episodes	Release date			ISBN	Ref.
Volume		Episodes	USA	UK	Australia	ISBN	Ref.
Season One	First Voyage	1–13	May 27, 2008	N/A	September 1, 2010	ISBN 1-4210-1347-9	
Season One	Second Voyage	14–26	September 16, 2008	N/A	October 13, 2010	ISBN 1-4210-1419-X	
Season One	Third Voyage	27–39	January 20, 2009	N/A	November 3, 2010	ISBN 1-4210-1531-5	
Season One	Fourth Voyage	40–53	March 31, 2009	N/A	December 15, 2010	ISBN 1-4210-1796-2	
Season Two	First Voyage	54–66	June 30, 2009	N/A	January 12, 2011	ISBN 1-4210-1888-8	
Season Two	Second Voyage	67–78	August 25, 2009	N/A	February 16, 2011	ISBN 1-4210-1889-6	
Season Two	Third Voyage	79–91	September 29, 2009	N/A	March 16, 2011	ISBN 1-4210-1890-X	
Season Two	Fourth Voyage	92–103	December 15, 2009	N/A	April 20, 2011	ISBN 1-4210-1891-8	
Season Two	Fifth Voyage	104–116	January 19, 2010	N/A	May 18, 2011	ISBN 1-4210-1892-6	
Season Two	Sixth Voyage	117–130	March 16, 2010	N/A	June 15, 2011	ISBN 1-4210-2004-1	
Season Two	Seventh Voyage	131–143	May 11, 2010	N/A	July 20, 2011	ISBN 1-4210-2075-0	
Season Three	First Voyage	144–156	July 6, 2010	N/A	August 17, 2011	ISBN 1-4210-2119-6	
Season Three	Second Voyage	157–169	August 31, 2010	N/A	September 14, 2011	ISBN 1-4210-2143-9	
Season Three	Third Voyage	170–182	October 26, 2010	N/A	October 19, 2011	ISBN 1-4210-2182-X	
Season Three	Fourth Voyage	183–195	January 25, 2011	N/A	November 16, 2011	ISBN 1-4210-2222-2	
Season Three	Fifth Voyage	196–205	April 19, 2011	N/A	December 14, 2011	ISBN 1-4210-2261-3	
Season Four	Voyage One	206–217	August 7, 2012	N/A	October 24, 2012	ISBN 1-4210-2520-5	
Season Four	Voyage Two	218–229	October 30, 2012	N/A	January 9, 2013	ISBN 1-4210-2598-1	
Season Four	Voyage Three	230–241	December 18, 2012	N/A	March 20, 2013	ISBN 1-4210-2615-5	
Season Four	Voyage Four	242–252	March 19, 2013	N/A	June 19, 2013	ISBN 1-4210-2647-3	
Season Four	Voyage Five	253–263	May 14, 2013	N/A	August 21, 2013	ISBN 1-4210-2680-5	
Collection	1	1–26	July 26, 2011	May 27, 2013	N/A	ISBN 1-4210-2341-5	
Collection	2	27–53	September 27, 2011	July 1, 2013	N/A	ISBN 1-4210-2404-7	
Collection	3	54–78	November 29, 2011	September 23, 2013	N/A	ISBN 1-4210-2405-5	
Collection	4	79–103	January 31, 2012	November 11, 2013	N/A	ISBN 1-4210-2447-0	
Collection	5	104–130	March 13, 2012	February 17, 2014	N/A	ISBN 1-4210-2466-7	
Collection	6	131–156	June 12, 2012	May 19, 2014	N/A	ISBN 1-4210-2492-6	
Collection	7	157–182	August 14, 2012	August 11, 2014	N/A	ISBN 1-4210-2522-1	
Collection	8	183–205	September 25, 2012	November 3, 2014	N/A	ISBN 1-4210-2580-9	
Collection	9	206–229	April 15, 2014	April 13, 2015	N/A	ISBN 1-4210-2850-6	
Collection	10	230–252	September 23, 2014	June 15, 2015	N/A	ISBN 1-4210-2932-4	
Collection	11	253–275	February 3, 2015	August 10, 2015	N/A	ISBN N/A	
Collection Box	One	1–103	January 6, 2015; July 5, 2019	N/A	October 24, 2012	ISBN N/A	
Collection Box	Two	104–205	February 17, 2015	N/A	October 31, 2013	ISBN N/A	
Collection Box	Three	206–299	March 31, 2015	N/A	December 7, 2016	ISBN N/A	
Voyage Collection	1	1–53	N/A		September 6, 2017	ISBN N/A	
Voyage Collection	2	54–103	N/A		September 6, 2017	ISBN N/A	
Voyage Collection	3	104–156	N/A		October 4, 2017	ISBN N/A	
Voyage Collection	4	157–205	N/A		November 8, 2017	ISBN N/A	
Voyage Collection	5	206–252	N/A		December 6, 2017	ISBN N/A	
Voyage Collection	6	253–299	N/A		January 10, 2018	ISBN N/A	
