= Rabby =

Rabby may refer to:

- Astro Rabby, a character in the 1990 video game Astro Rabby
- Mannaf Rabby (born 1997), Bangladeshi footballer
- Rabby, a character in the 2021 play Fat Ham

== See also ==
- Rabbit (disambiguation)
- Robby (disambiguation)
