= Sukeban Shachou Rena =

2009 video game

- Cover art
- Developer: Dearfield
- Publisher: Jorudan
- Platform: Wii
- Release: JP: October 22, 2009
- Genre: Action game
- Mode: Single-player

Sukeban Shachou Rena (女番社長レナＷｉｉ 猫社長、つかえる社員大募集。) is an action video game developed by Dearfield and published by Jorudan for the Wii console, exclusively available in Japan.

This is also the last known video game to be published by Jorudan.

== Gameplay ==
In the game, Rena is a cat who is the mascot of a blog named "Nekopunch" and the CEO of a fictional company named Cat Queen, Inc. It is the player's objective to appease Rena in order to be accepted as her employee.

Sukeban Shachou Rena's gameplay involves several minigames where the player takes control of a cat or in other minigames, humans. Minigame examples include playing the piano, dodging pouncing cats, taking money from a cat while it is not looking, and dancing to appease Rena, using the Wii Remote. Some of the minigames also make use of the Nunchuk.

== Reception ==
The game was a commercial and critical failure. While there are claims of the game only selling 100 copies in the first week, these claims have no proof behind them and is a hoax that was spread by numerous publications. Famitsu awarded the game a score of 22 out of 40 (5/6/6/5). Critics praised the humor of the story, but criticized the lack of content and the quality of the minigames.
