= Dahna: Megami Tanjō =

1991 video game

- Cover art
- Developer: IGS
- Publisher: IGS
- Designers: Hitoshi Kido; Kozo Igarashi
- Programmers: Hideaki Tomioka; Nobusada Konishi; Yukihiro Hori
- Artists: Kozo Igarashi; Yasuhiko Kikuchi; Takeshi Kikuchi
- Platform: Sega Mega Drive
- Release: JP: December 20, 1991
- Genre: Action
- Mode: Single-player

Dahna: Megami Tanjō (Dahna 女神誕生; Dahna: Goddess' Birth) is a 1991 platform action game developed by and published by IGS for the Mega Drive exclusively in Japan and South Korea. The player controls the warrior woman title character who struggles against the powers of an evil sorceress raiding her village. The story is told through cutscenes as Dahna is helped along the way by various mythical beasts.

== Gameplay ==
The protagonist Dahna is capable of a few attacks: the player can use sword combinations with a repeated press of the Attack button while being able to stab enemies above Dahna and enemies below her when jumping. Aside from melee combat, Dahna is also capable of using magic spells. Powered by magic orbs from fallen enemies, Dahna's magic is fueled by a bar that is filled with every orb collected and the spell is determined by how full the bar is. At low bar length, Dahna can launch a sideways fire shot while at mid-bar length, Dahna can summon a blinding fog. At full bar length, Dahna can summon Thunder Magic, but it appears as several downpours of magma. Dahna's life bar can be filled as she collects life power-ups, allowing her to sustain more damage.

Throughout the game, Dahna is capable of riding on the backs of different beasts including a horse, a griffin and a large ogre. The first two creatures allow for a different type of stage progression while the griffin and ogre can unleash unique attacks. The game allows a total of five continues per play with no lives system which makes for a high difficulty level throughout its six stages.

== Plot ==
There lived a wealthy family whose heirs were two daughters: Regine and Dahna. These two sisters were born with a strange magic that could enable them to summon the elements and other unknown creations. It was this magic that many within the spiritual underworld desired, particularly Regine's, whose powers grew stronger with age. On Dahna's seventh birthday, the sisters' parents were murdered in a violent kidnapping attempt, but the wreckage separated the sisters and Dahna escaped. She hid in secrecy, but eventually took shelter in a nearby village where she honed her magic and combat abilities under the guidance of the village sorcerer Magh. Ten years later, a mysterious invasion force led by an evil sorceress attacked her village and kidnapped Magh, prompting Dahna on her first battle.
