= SWAT Kats: The Radical Squadron (video game) =

1995 video game

- Developer: AIM
- Publisher: Hudson Soft USA
- Directors: Toru Nakagawa; Joe Shishikura
- Designer: Daisuke Tajima
- Programmer: Kazuaki Toida
- Composer: Tomoyuki Hamada
- Platform: Super NES
- Release: NA: August 1995
- Genres: Action; Platformer
- Mode: Single-player

SWAT Kats: The Radical Squadron is a side-scrolling action video game developed by AIM and published by Hudson Soft for the Super NES. It is based on the animated series of the same name, and was released in North America in August 1995.

== Gameplay ==
The game is a 2-D action platformer where the player can be Razor or T-Bone. The game uses a password system and features third-person flying sequences using the Turbokat Fighter. The game is based on multiple episodes of the series and includes a different boss on each world, and Dark Kat is the final boss. Mayor Manx (rather than Callie Briggs who has been kidnapped by Dark Kat) sends an urgent message at the beginning of each world.

== Reception ==
Reception

Review scores
Publication	Score
Game Players	60%
GamePro	2.125/5
Next Generation	2/5
Nintendo Power	3.1/5
Ação Games	17/30
it:Game Power (IT)	58/100
SuperGamePower	3.0/5
VideoGame	22/30

Next Generation rated the game two stars out of five, stating that "What sets this apart are the intermittent fighter jet stages, done in someone's bizarre, myopic idea of what a simple 3D, one-point perspective should be – shots fired 'into' the screen, 'toward' your enemies tend to veer off to the 'sides.' Someone not under the influence of mind-altering substances is going to take a while to 'hit' anything."

Damien McFerran of Retro Gamer considered the game one of publisher Hudson Soft's weakest releases, stating, "The fact that the TV show was pulled the year before the game was launched probably didn't help matters, but the generally poor quality of the title consigned it to obscurity. Thank goodness."
