= Robocco Wars =

1991 video game

- Developer: Pixel
- Publisher: IGS
- Composer: Masaharu Iwata
- Platform: Family Computer
- Release: JP: August 2, 1991
- Genres: Action; Platformer
- Mode: Single-player

Robocco Wars (ロボッ子ウォーズ; "Robo Child Wars") is a side-scrolling platform video game released for the Family Computer in 1991 exclusively in Japan.

== Summary ==
The game allows the player to control a shape-changing robot named R-10 (and his human controller Lance) as they fight evil robots. On the land, the player is a freight train that must follow the railroad tracks to the boss of the level. However, the robot turns into an airplane when the player is forced to fly to the next mission. Sea missions require the player to transform into a submarine.

The player has three lives and three continues as they struggle to liberate the world of Robocco from evil.
