= Tricky Kick =

1991 video game

- Developer: Alfa System
- Publisher: IGS
- Platform: TurboGrafx-16
- Release: NA: January 1991; JP: June 28, 1991
- Genre: Puzzle
- Mode: Single-player

Tricky Kick (Note: Known in Japan as Tricky (Japanese: トリッキー, Hepburn: Torikkī).) is a 1991 puzzle video game developed by Alfa System and published by Information Global Service for the TurboGrafx-16.

== Gameplay ==
Gameplay screenshot

The object of the game is to maneuver pairs of the same type of monster or animal together by kicking them into straight lines until prevented by an obstacle; when a match is made, the pair disappears. The puzzles consist of creatures scattered through a landscape littered with various obstacles.

The player controls different characters on six scenarios: The young elf Oberon has to rescue the fairy friend Chima from the evil sorceress Kymera; Udon, the giant-robot piloting hero of the 25th century, must save his city from an alien invasion; Japanese kid named Taro goes to visit a haunted mansion to pass the test to join a club; the caveman Gonzo seeks to hunt down a woolly mammoth; Japanese schoolgirl Mayumi needs to find her way to her classmate Biff's birthday party; the young feudal Japanese prince Suzuki wants to rule the country.

== Development and release ==
Tricky Kick was developed by Alfa System and published by Information Global Service.

== Reception ==
Reception

Review scores
Publication	Score
Consoles +	70%
Gekkan PC Engine	75/100, 60/100, 70/100, 75/100, 75/100
Joystick	67%
Marukatsu PC Engine	6/10, 8/10, 8/10, 7/10
Player One	82%
VideoGames & Computer Entertainment	5/10
Digital Press	8/10
Electric Brain	70%
Hippon Super!	5/10

Tricky Kick received average reviews. GamePro's C.T. Asian wrote that it is "an extensive and challenging game that's great to take on with an audience. It's one of those carts that's bound to stir up a lot of group participation - everyone has their own strategy". Nevertheless, C.T. Asian criticized the poor translation of the text from Japanese.
