= Battle Bull =

1990 video game

- North American cover art
- Developer: Jorudan
- Publisher: SETA Corporation
- Composer: Takayuki Suzuki
- Platform: Game Boy
- Release: JP: November 30, 1990; NA: January 1991
- Genre: Action
- Mode: Single-player

Battle Bull (バトル・ブル) is a top-down action video game for the original Game Boy; released in 1990 in Japan and 1991 in North America.

== Summary ==
During the course of a level, the player is given a time limit and certain number of vehicles to destroy.

The player controls a driver of an excavation vehicle as he competes in a 48-level tournament of drilling things.

Players may kill rival drivers only by pushing huge stones at them. Most of the other stones are a permanent part of the cavern; while others can be used to eliminate the opponents. Money is earned after each level for the purpose of upgrading the player's vehicle. Players can improve their engines, purchase extra lives, shovels that can dig better, and weapons to improve the odds on the playing field. A kill ratio is required to be met in order to reach the next stage. Otherwise, the player remains in the current level.

After finishing all 48 levels, the game proclaims that the "battle is over" and that the player becomes "the new champion." The final scene in the game is where the player looks over the sunset with his girlfriend along with the closing credits.
