= Armadillo (video game) =

1991 video game

- Developer: AIM
- Publisher: IGS
- Designer: Masaki Kojima
- Programmer: Chikuchiku Bamboo
- Platform: Family Computer
- Release: JP: August 9, 1991
- Genre: Platform
- Modes: Single-player; Multiplayer

Armadillo (Note: Japanese: アルマジロ, Hepburn: Arumajiro) is a platform video game, published by IGS for the Family Computer. It was released in Japan on August 9, 1991 for the Family Computer. The game was not released in other countries.

== Gameplay ==
The player controls a yellow armadillo with a red hat named Billy the Shell. Between levels, the player moves around on a map screen, similar to Super Mario Bros. 3. The map screen consists of many small squares, which the player can "capture" one at a time, after which they're crossed out and can be moved across freely. There are also some larger squares with pictures on them, and if the player is on them, they can choose to begin an action stage, which has to be cleared before the player can pass it. There is also another character moving around on the map screen, and if the player is on the same space as them, they can start a boss battle, which has to be cleared to move onto the next world.

The player can walk around and jump, and roll into a ball. While rolled up in ball form, the player can roll and bounce around. Control in this form can be slippery, but it is the only way to attack enemies. Also, while rolled up in a ball, the player can bounce higher (by holding the Jump button) than ordinary jumps would allow.

There is also a two player mode. Two players (player one has a red hat, player two has green) take turns moving around on the same map and playing the stages when they reach them. If the boss is defeated, both players will move on to the next world.

A bonus life is awarded every 30,000 points.

There were plans for Armadillo to be released in North America, as well as a sequel, but both were cancelled. A sequel called Armadillo Gaiden was also in the making for the Nintendo Game Boy, however it instead got relicensed and sold as Ultraman Ball.

Among some NES enthusiasts familiar with unlicensed bootleg game cartridges, this game is also known as Super Mario IV, in which the armadillo's character sprites have been edited to look like Mario.
