= Shōnin yo Taishi wo Idake!! =

1995 video game

- Cover art of Shōnin yo Taishi wo Idake!!
- Developer: AIM
- Publisher: Bandai
- Composers: Kenichi Kamio; Tomoyuki Hamada
- Platform: Super Famicom
- Release: JP: December 15, 1995
- Genre: Board
- Mode: Single-player

Shōnin yo Taishi wo Idake!! (商人よ、大志を抱け！！; lit. "Merchants, Be Ambitious!!!") is a 1995 Japan-exclusive board video game for the Super Famicom.
