= J-League Fighting Soccer =

1992 video game

- Developer(s): Graphic Research
- Publisher(s): IGS
- Composer(s): Fumito Tamayama (Game Boy); Yoko Suzuki (Famicom)
- Platform(s): Game Boy; Famicom
- Release: Game Boy: JP: December 27, 1992; Famicom: JP: June 19, 1993
- Genre(s): Sports, simulation
- Mode(s): Single-player, multiplayer

J-League Fighting Soccer: The King of Ace Strikers (Jリーグ ファイティングサッカー, J-Rīgu Faitingu Sakkā) is a Japan-exclusive soccer simulation video game for the Game Boy and Family Computer.

The Game Boy version (released almost 5 months before the start of the inaugural season of the J.League) was the first title officially licensed by the J.League.
