= Gdleen =

Japanese light novel series

- Jikō Wakusei Gdleen
- Cover of the first light novel

自航惑星ガデュリン (Jikō Wakusei Gadyurin)
- Genre: Science fiction
- Light novel
- Written by: Yuto Ramon
- Illustrated by: Hitoshi Yoneda
- Published by: Kadokawa Shoten
- Imprint: Sneaker Bunko
- Original run: September 1989 – November 1991
- Volumes: 7
- Original video animation
- Directed by: Takao Kato; Toyoo Ashida
- Written by: Michiru Shimada
- Music by: Michiaki Kato
- Studio: Ashi Productions
- Released: March 1, 1990
- Runtime: 45 minutes
- Video game
- Developer: Jorudan
- Publisher: SETA
- Genre: Role-playing game
- Platform: Super Famicom
- Released: May 28, 1991

Jikō Wakusei Gdleen (自航惑星ガデュリン, Jikō Wakusei Gadyurin), known simply as Gdleen, is a Japanese science fiction light novel series written by Yuto Ramon and illustrated by Hitoshi Yoneda. The first novel in the series, subtitled Kamigami no Mikotachi (神々の巫子たち; trans. The Shamans of the Gods), was published in September 1989 by Kadokawa Shoten under the Sneaker Bunko imprint. It was adapted into an original video animation and released in 1990.

A role-playing video game based on the anime was developed by Jorudan and published by SETA, for the Super Famicom in 1991.

== Plot ==
The overarching plot revolves around the Self-Navigating Planet of Gdleen with the first arc of the books involving Gavanna's prophecy and how it ties into the Gdleen Project. Through several character's adventure throughout the world of Gdleen, the Gdleen Project is revealed.

== Media ==
=== Light novels ===
Jikō Wakusei Gdleen series

No.	Subtitle	Release date	ISBN
1	Kamigami no Mikotachi (神々の巫子たち; trans. Shamans of the Gods)	September 1989	978-4044112011
2	Ryūn no Densetsu (リューンの伝説; trans. Legend of Ryūn)	November 1989	978-4044112028
3	Gdleen Keikaku (ガデュリン計画; trans. The Gdleen Project)	January 1990	978-4044112035

Gdleen (Ai Hōrō Hen (愛・放浪編)) series

No.	Subtitle	Release date	ISBN
1	Atsuki Kaze no Otome (熱き風の乙女; trans. Maiden of the Passionate Wind)	October 1990	978-4044112042
2	Kurenai no Senshi-tachi (紅の戦士たち; trans. The Crimson Warriors)	December 1990	978-4044112059
3	Unmei no Hijiri Kyōdai (運命の聖兄妹; trans. The Fated Holy Siblings)	May 1991	978-4044112066
4	Taiyō no Musume (太陽の娘; trans. Daughter of the Sun)	November 1991	978-4044112073

=== Anime ===
The OVA, called Gdleen, was directed by Takao Kato and Toyoo Ashida and based on a screenplay written by Michiru Shimada.

The plot revolves around Ryūn who crash lands on the planet Gdleen. There he meets Fana and the two are soon entangled in a long-standing war between the Babaress and Miyorl tribes.

=== Video games ===
Gdleen received two video game adaptations: Digan no Maseki (ディガンの魔石;trans. The Magic Stone of Digan) for PC-88, PC-98, and MSX as well as the Self-titled Gdleen for Super Famicom.

The video game adaptation, called Gdleen, was designed by Yuhei Yamaguchi, while the music was composed by Psychosonic, You Ohyama, and Toshimichi Isoe. It is a single-player video game, and was the first role-playing game for the Super Famicom, released six months after the video game console's launch in Japan.

== Reception ==
The Encyclopedia of Science Fiction judged Gdleen to be a good anime, praising its attractive animation and reasonably entertaining plot while criticizing its rushed storytelling, which it attributed to the OVA's short running time. It particularly highlighted the humorous potential of the protagonist's characterization as a corporate salaryman and his interactions with a robot obsessed with commercial opportunities, suggesting that these elements deserved greater development. The encyclopedia also found the two warring alien societies rather generic. The entry noted that the revelation of the planet's artificial construction and the accompanying prophetic narration, although important to the original light novel series, have little relevance to the OVA's self-contained narrative.
