= Michiru Shimada =

Japanese screenwriter (1959–2017)

- 島田 満
- Born: May 19, 1959
- Died: December 15, 2017 (aged 58)
- Education: Waseda University
- Occupation: Screenwriter
- Writing career
- Genre: Anime

Michiru Shimada (島田 満, Shimada Michiru; May 19, 1959 – December 15, 2017) was a Japanese anime screenwriter from Tokyo. Shimada was a graduate of Waseda University. She made her screenwriting debut in 1980.

She died in 2017, aged 58, from undisclosed causes.

== Filmography ==
- Urusei Yatsura (1981 TV series), Screenplay
- Dr. Slump and Arale-chan (1981 TV series), Script
- Dr. Slump: "Hoyoyo!" Space Adventure (1982 film), Screenplay
- World Famous Fairy Tale Series (1983 short films), Script
- Dr. Slump and Arale-chan: Hoyoyo! The Treasure of Nanaba Castle (1984 film), Screenplay
- Okawari-Boy Starzan S (1984 TV series), Screenplay
- Dr. Slump and Arale-chan: Hoyoyo! City of Dreams, Mechapolis (1985 film), Screenplay
- Choushinsei Flashman (1986 TV series), Script
- Roots Search (1986 OVA), Screenplay
- Maison Ikkoku: Kanketsuhen (1988 film), Script
- Peter Pan no Bōken (1989 TV series), Script
- Gdleen (1990 OVA), Screenplay
- Future GPX Cyber Formula (1991 TV series), Screenplay
- Spirit of Wonder (1992 OVA), Screenplay
- Flanders no Inu, Boku no Patrasche (1992 TV series), Script
- Wakakusa Monogatari Nan to Jou Sensei (1993 TV series), Script
- You're Under Arrest (1994 OVA), Screenplay
- Kindaichi Case Files (1996 film), Screenplay
- Rurouni Kenshin (1996 TV series), Screenplay
- You're Under Arrest (1996 TV series), Screenplay
- Ie Naki Ko Remi (1996 TV series), Script
- Gegege no Kitarō: Obake Nighter (1997 film), Screenplay
- Doctor Slump (1997 TV series), Script
- Kindaichi Case Files (1997 TV series), Storyboard
- One Piece (1999 TV series), Script, Storyboard
- The Aurora (2000 film), Screenplay
- Tottoko Hamtaro (2000 TV series), Script
- One Piece: The Movie (2000 film), Script
- Tottoko Hamutaro: Ham Ham Ham~Jya! Maboroshi no Princess (2002 film), Scenario
- Gakuen Alice (2004 TV series), Script
- The Snow Queen (2005 TV series), Script
- Koi suru Tenshi Angelique ~ Kokoro no Mezameru Toki ~ (2006 TV series), Script (ep 1, 2, 3), Series Organization
- Koi suru Tenshi Angelique ~ Kagayaki no Ashita ~ (2007 TV series), Series Composition
- Emily of New Moon (2007 TV series), Series Composition, Screenplay
- Nanatsuiro Drops (2007 TV series), Series Composition, Script (ep 1–4, 7, 11–12)
- Shugo Chara! (2007 TV series), Series Composition, Script (ep 1, 2, 7, 13, 17, 23, 25, 32, 36, 42, 51)
- Kon'nichiwa Anne: Before Green Gables (2009 TV series), Series Composition, Script
- Little Witch Academia: The Enchanted Parade (2015 short film), Screenplay
- Little Witch Academia (2017 TV series), Screenplay
