= Fortyfive =

Japanese video game company

Fortyfive Co. Ltd.
- Industry: Video games
- Headquarters: Japan
- Website: http://www.xlv.co.jp/

Fortyfive Co. Ltd. is a Japanese software development company known for its Tokyo Bus Guide and other SEGA Dreamcast games. Prior to 1997, the studio was known as AIM.

== Games as AIM ==
- Armadillo, Famicom/NES
- Lodoss Tou Senki
- Honoo no Doukyuuji: Dodge Danpei, PC Engine
- Fausseté Amour, PC Engine CD
- Crayon Shin-chan: Nagagutsu Dobon!!, Super Famicom
- Doraemon 3: Nobita to Toki no Hougyoku, Super Famicom
- Inspector Gadget, Super NES
- Lord Monarch, Super Famicom
- Shōnin yo Taishi wo Idake!!, Super Famicom
- SWAT Kats: The Radical Squadron, Super NES

== Games as Fortyfive ==
- Hello Kitty no Garden Panic
- July (ジュライ)
- Tokyo Bus Guide (東京バス案内)
- Tokyo Bus Guide Bijin Bus Guide Tenjou Pack (aka Tokyo Bus Guide: Featuring a Beautiful Bus Tour Conductor) (東京バス案内美人バスガイド添乗パック)
- Tsuushin Taisen Logic Battle Daisessen (通信対戦ロジックバトル 大雪戦)
- Weakness Hero Torauman (ウィークネスヒーロー トラウマン)

== Related Lists ==
- List of Dreamcast Games
