= Astro Rabby =

1990 video game

- Cover art
- Developer: Cyclone System
- Publisher: IGS
- Platform: Game Boy
- Release: JP: October 12, 1990
- Genre: Action
- Mode: Single-player

Astro Rabby (アストロラビー) is a 1990 action video game published by Information Global Service (IGS) for the original Game Boy exclusively in Japan on October 12, 1990. It is the first Game Boy title to be published by that company.

== Story ==
The Dortoise Troops have hidden the ten power-up parts throughout outer space so that Astro Rabby cannot fly. His creator, Doc, wants Rabby to soar freely in the sky, so he asks Rabby to retrieve these special parts from the Dortoise Troops.

== Gameplay ==
Players must use the platforms to progress through the levels.

The concept of Astro Rabby is that the player is a rabbit who must travel through certain top-viewed levels with automatic scrolling. Since the number of usable platforms is severely limited in this game, learning to control the jumps becomes a primary asset. Landing on platforms causes the block to break due to the excess force that the player applies to it. Sometimes, power-ups are given, which will extend the relatively short time limit that Astro Rabby offers.

A heart is needed in each level to progress to the next level; the game is an infinite loop without collecting them. Players have control of a gun with limited ammo. While the jumping height is very short when beginning the game, it becomes longer as the player collects the appropriate power-up item. Enemies can also be avoided, in addition to being shot at, making the fantasy violence component in the game completely optional.

While larger platforms allow the player to jump further, the use of power-ups can also improve the character's jumping ability to the player's advantage.

== Reception ==
Upon release, Famitsu magazine scored the game a 20 out of 40. German video gaming magazine Power Play gave Astro Rabby a score of 44% (the equivalent to a letter grade of F) in their February 1991 issue.
