= Jorudan =

Japanese video game company

Jorudan Co., Ltd.
- Traded as: TYO: 3710
- Founded: December 1979
- Headquarters: Shinjuku, Tokyo, Japan
- Number of employees: 178 (2025)
- Website: jorudan.co.jp

Jorudan (ジョルダン) is a Japanese company headquartered in Shinjuku, Tokyo. It has been involved in the development and publishing of video games since 1991, and is primarily known for operating jorudan.co.jp, a public transport route navigation website.

== Video games ==
Sega Genesis

- Task Force Harrier EX (1991)

SNES

- GD Leen (1991)
- Imperium (1992)
- Xardion (1992)
- Musya (1992)
- Alien vs Predator (1993)
- Date Kimiko no Virtual Tennis (伊達公子のバーチャルテニス; "Kimiko Date's virtual tennis") (1994)
- Hisshou 777 Fighter (1994)
- Hisshou 777 Fighter II (1994)
- Hisshou 777 Fighter III (1995)

Game Boy

- Battle Bull (1990)

Game Boy Color

- Hamster Club (1999)
- Chase HQ: Secret Police (2000)
- Bubble Bobble Classic (2000)
- Hamster Club Awasete Chu (2000)
- Hamster Club 2 (2000)
- Yogi Bear: Great Balloon Burst (2000)
- Pop n Pop (2001)
- Hamster Club Oshiema Chu (2001)

PlayStation

- Imadoki no Vampire: Bloody Bride (1996)
- One on One (1999)
- Kickboxing (2001)
- Hamster Club i (2002)
- Hoshi no Mahoroba (2002)

Game Boy Advance

- Space Hexcite: Metal Legend EX (2002)
- Fancy Pocket (2002)
- Inukko Club: Fukumaru no Daibouken (2002)
- Hamster Club: 4 (2003)
- Taiketsu! Ultra Hero (2004)
- Petz: Hamsterz Life 2 (2007)

PlayStation 2

- Baskelian (2003)
- Bouken Shounen Club Gahou (2003)

Nintendo DS

- The Eigyoudou (2008)
- Nippon Futsal League Kounin: Minna no Futsal (2008)

Wii

- Sukeban Shachou Rena (22 October 2009)
