= Music of One Piece =

One Piece discography
- Cover of One Piece: Stampede's soundtrack album
- Studio albums: 112 (Total)
- Soundtrack albums: 17
- Compilation albums: 8
- Singles: 51
- Main composers: Kohei Tanaka; Shirō Hamaguchi
- Labels: Avex; Nippon Columbia; Bandai Namco Entertainment; Sony Music Japan International; BMG Ariola

More than 100 musical CDs have been created for the media franchise built around Eiichiro Oda's manga One Piece. Various theme songs and character songs were released on a total of 51 singles, many of them were also released in collected form on the 8 compilation albums or the 17 soundtrack CDs, along with background music from the anime television series, the feature films, and video games.

Kohei Tanaka and Shirō Hamaguchi are the main composers for One Piece anime soundtracks including OVAs, TV specials, films except One Piece: Film Gold which was composed by Yuki Hayashi and there are numerous other artists who have worked with Kohei Tanaka and Shirō Hamaguchi to produce the soundtracks.

On August 11, 2019, it was announced that Sakuramen, a musical group would collaborate with Kohei Tanaka to compose music for the anime's Wano arc.

The anime television series currently consists of 47 pieces of theme music, 27 opening themes and 21 ending themes. As of episode 279, ending themes were omitted and, starting from episode 326 onwards, opening themes were extended from 110 seconds long to 150 seconds long. In episodes 1-206 of Funimation's English-language release of the series, the opening and ending themes were dubbed into English by various voice actors, before reverting to the Japanese versions from episodes 207 onward and later some openings were not licensed by Funimation's release, leaving only the narration dubbed on select opening themes. Starting with episode 1071, the ending theme would be reinstated after 17 years.

== Albums and track lists ==
No.	Year	Title	Tracks	Length	Release date	Notes	Ref(s)
1	2000	ONE PIECE MUSIC & SONG Collection: # / Title / Length / Notes; 01 / The Great Pirate of Gold Woonan / 1:42 / Track: 01~16 - One Piece: The Movie Track: 02, 16~25 - TV Anime One Piece 01, 03~12, 14, 15, 17, 19, 21, 25 Composed and Arranged by: Kouhei Tanaka 02 TV Anime "One Piece" OP1, "One Piece: The Movie" OP Composed by: Kouhei Tanaka Arranged by: Takayuki Negishi Vocal by: Hiroshi Kitadani Lyrics by: Shoko Fujibayashi 13 Composed and Arranged by: Kouhei Tanaka, Shiro Hamaguchi 16 TV Anime "One Piece" ED1, "One Piece: The Movie" ED Composed and Arranged by: Junta Mori Vocal by: Maki Otsuki Lyrics by: Maki Otsuki 18 TV Anime "One Piece" Character Song Luffy Composed by: Kouhei Tanaka Arranged by: Yasunori Iwasaki Vocal by: Luffy (Mayumi Tanaka) Lyrics by: Shoko Fujibayashi 20 TV Anime "One Piece" Character Song Nami Composed by: Kouhei Tanaka Arranged by: Yasunori Iwasaki Vocal by: Nami (Akemi Okamura) Lyrics by: Shoko Fujibayashi 22 Composed and Arranged by: Shiro Hamaguchi 23 Composed by: Masahiro Takami Arranged by: Yasunori Iwasaki Vocal by: Hiroshi Kitadani Lyrics by: Shoko Fujibayashi 24 Composed by: Kouhei Tanaka; 02 / We Are! [TV size] / 1:52; 03 / Hungry Luffy / 3:11; 04 / El Drago's Appearance / 1:43; 05 / The World's Best Oden! / 2:49; 06 / Landing! Gold Island / 1:36; 07 / Usopp, it's Dangerous! / 3:09; 08 / Explosion! Ultrasonic Waves!! / 1:50; 09 / Woonan and Ganzo / 2:04; 10 / Gold and Oden / 2:30; 11 / Anger!! / 3:22; 12 / Gum-Gum VS Voice-Voice / 3:03; 13 / Gum-Gum Bazooka!! / 4:01; 14 / A Message from Woonan / 2:59; 15 / Set Sail to the Pirate King / 1:39; 16 / memories / 4:27; 17 / I Will Become King of the Pirates! / 2:10; 18 / WANTED! / 4:16; 19 / Reliable Comrade! / 3:22; 20 / MUSIC / 4:08; 21 / To the Great Sea Route! / 3:44; 22 / Duel!! / 3:29; 23 / The Straw Hats' Jolly Roger / 3:07; 24 / Hooray! Let's Party!! / 2:37; 25 / And with still much more to come, the adventure continues! / 0:33; Disc length / / 69:23	25	69:23	Mar 18, 2000	Compilation	
2	2000	ONE PIECE MUSIC & SONG Collection 2: # / Title / Length / Notes; 01 / We Are! [TV size - w/ narration] / 1:52 / 01 Composed by: Kouhei Tanaka Arranged by: Takayuki Negishi Vocal by: Hiroshi Kitadani Lyrics by: Shoko Fujibayash Cast Narration: Mahito Ohba Gold Roger: Chikao Ohtsuka 02, 10, 15, 17 Composed by: Kouhei Tanaka, Shiro Hamaguchi Arranged by: Kouhei Tanaka, Shiro Hamaguchi 03 Composed by: Kouhei Tanaka Arranged by: Kouhei Tanaka, Shiro Hamaguchi 04 Composed by: Masahiro Takami Arranged by: Masahiro Takami Vocal by: Luffy (Mayumi Tanaka) Lyrics by: Shoko Fujibayashi 05, 06, 08, 12 Composed by: Kouhei Tanaka Arranged by: Kouhei Tanaka 07 Composed by: Masahiro Takami Arranged by: Naruhi Inaba Lyrics by: Shoko Fujibayashi 09 Composed by: Kouhei Tanaka Arranged by: Yasuhisa Murase Lyrics by: Shoko Fujibayashi 11, 13, 14 Composed by: Shiro Hamaguchi Arranged by: Shiro Hamaguchi 16 Composed by: Kouhei Tanaka Arranged by: Takayuki Negishi Vocal by: Hiroshi Kitadani 18 Composed by: Kouhei Tanaka Arranged by: Hayato Matsuo Lyrics by: Shoko Fujibayashi 19 Composed by: Hiroshi Kitadani Arranged by: Yasuhisa Murase Vocal by: Hiroshi Kitadani Lyrics by: Shoko Fujibayashi 20 Composed by: Kouhei Tanaka Arranged by: Yasunori Iwasaki Lyrics by: Shoko Fujibayashi; 02 / Village Harbour / 2:17; 03 / Luffy / 4:40; 04 / Holy Holiday! / 4:09; 05 / Zoro / 4:49; 06 / Nami / 3:21; 07 / Usopp☆Drop [Karaoke] / 2:58; 08 / Sanji / 2:22; 09 / Sanji The Great Blue ~You Are Dessert~ [Karaoke] / 5:53; 10 / Pirate / 3:31; 11 / Difficult / 3:19; 12 / Escape / 3:30; 13 / Overtaken / 3:10; 14 / Angry / 2:07; 15 / Can't Escape, Fight! / 3:05; 16 / We Are! [Melody version] / 4:00; 17 / The Fight Continues / 2:39; 18 / Piece of a Hawk's Wing [Karaoke] / 3:34; 19 / TALKING BLUES / 4:05; 20 / WANTED! [Karaoke] / 4:16; Disc length / / 65:37	20	65:37	Sep 21, 2000	TV Anime	
3	2000	ONE PIECE MUSIC & SONG Collection 3: # / Title / Length / Notes; 01 / HI! HO! READY GO! / 3:08 / 01, 22 Composed by: Eri Takeda Arranged by: Eri Takeda Vocal by: Luffy (Mayumi Tanaka), Zoro (Kazuya Nakai), Nami (Akemi Okamura), Usopp (Kappei Yamaguchi), Sanji (Hiroaki Hirata) Lyrics by: Shoko Fujibayashi 02, 03, 04, 08, 09, 12, 14, 19, 21 Composed by: Kouhei Tanaka, Shiro Hamaguchi Arranged by: Kouhei Tanaka, Shiro Hamaguchi 05 Composed by: Kouhei Tanaka Arranged by: Kouhei Tanaka 06, 10 Composed by: Masahiro Takami Arranged by: Masahiro Takami Lyrics by: Shoko Fujibayashi 07 Composed by: Kouhei Tanaka Arranged by: Akifumi Tada Lyrics by: Shoko Fujibayashi 11, 15, 16 Composed by: Shiro Hamaguchi Arranged by: Shiro Hamaguchi 13 Composed by: Masahiro Takami Arranged by: Naruhi Inaba Lyrics by: Shoko Fujibayashi 17 Composed by: Kouhei Tanaka Arranged by: Yasuhisa Murase Lyrics by: Shoko Fujibayashi 18 Composed by: Kouhei Tanaka Arranged by: Takayuki Negishi Lyrics by: Shoko Fujibayashi 20 Composed by: Masahiro Takami Arranged by: Yasunori Iwasaki Lyrics by: Shoko Fujibayashi; 02 / To the Ocean / 2:32; 03 / Luffy's Pace / 3:57; 04 / Sanji's Feast / 3:55; 05 / Food Fight / 1:38; 06 / Holy Holiday! [Karaoke] / 2:10; 07 / Caravel FAREWELL ~Onward Going Merry~ [Karaoke] / 3:23; 08 / If There Are Storms, There Are Stars Too / 5:50; 09 / Mother Sea / 3:55; 10 / Sea Moon See You [Karaoke] / 4:04; 11 / Stealthy Night Shadow / 3:27; 12 / Landing at Town / 6:42; 13 / 1.2.Jango! [Karaoke] / 2:44; 14 / Desperate Situation / 4:18; 15 / One Hour Evacuation! / 2:12; 16 / I Can't Lose! / 3:18; 17 / Spirit of ZORO [Karaoke] / 2:17; 18 / We Are! [TV size - Karaoke] / 1:50; 19 / We Did it! / 2:17; 20 / The Straw Hats' Jolly Roger [Karaoke] / 3:07; 21 / After Eating, Grand Line! / 2:19; 22 / Samba Bomber: Devil Fruit / 2:39; Disc length / / 71:42	22	71:42	Dec 21, 2000	TV Anime	
4	2001	ONE PIECE "The Adventure in Nejimaki Island" MUSIC FILE: # / Title / Length / Notes; 01 / The Going Merry Was Stolen / 1:32 / 32 Composed & Arranged by: GROOVE SURFERS Performed by: Folder5 Lyrics: Chiroru Yaho Conductor: Kohei Tanaka Strings: Masatsugu Shinozaki Group Brass: Masahiko Sugasaka Group Horn: Otohiko Fujita Group Flute: Takashi Asahi Oboe: Masakazu Ishibashi Clarinet: Tadashi Hoshino Percussion: Tomoko Kusakari Percussion: Tamao Fujii Piano: Ichirou Nagata Synth Operator: Minoru Maruo [まるおみのる] Recording Engineer: Juji Nakamura Musician Coordinate: 太田敏明 (ベルベットライン) Mastering Engineer: Tetsuya Yamamoto (avex studio), Rena Koyanagi (avex studio) Recording Studio: Sound City Mastering Studio: avex studio; 02 / The Thief Brothers Appear / 0:58; 03 / Trump Pirates Theme / 1:01; 04 / Defeat the Trump Soldier! / 0:48; 05 / Akiisu's Music Box / 2:05; 06 / Nami Was Kidnapped! / 0:38; 07 / Clockwork Island / 1:16; 08 / Mysterious Clockwork Town / 3:20; 09 / The Inhabitants' Sorrow / 0:31; 10 / Bet Your Life On It! / 0:42; 11 / Menace of the Toro Toro Fruit! / 0:19; 12 / Sanji's In A Big Pinch! / 1:05; 13 / Trump Castle Assault! / 0:28; 14 / Terror of the King Cannon / 0:41; 15 / Bad Smell! Gasu Gasu Attack / 0:59; 16 / Usopp's Life-Risking Attack / 0:41; 17 / Aim For the Top Floor! / 0:36; 18 / Boroodo's Confession / 1:54; 19 / Zoro Versus Pin Joker / 1:03; 20 / Bear King's Rage / 0:48; 21 / Boroodo's Courage / 2:16; 22 / Full Throttle Luffy! / 0:44; 23 / Revival of the Luffy Pirates! / 1:47; 24 / Strike Back! Sanji and Usopp / 1:43; 25 / Spirited Swordsman Zoro / 1:28; 26 / Gomu Gomu Is Ineffective?! / 1:14; 27 / King Cannon Fires! / 0:23; 28 / Huge Reversal! Luffy's Sure-Killing Move! / 1:25; 29 / Diamond Clock / 1:37; 30 / Clockwork Island's Collapse / 1:32; 31 / Mother, Then Setting Off / 2:00; 32 / Believe (Movie Size) / 1:45; Disc length / / 39:19	32	39:19	Mar 14, 2001	Movie 2	
5	2001	ONE PIECE MUSIC & BEST SONG Collection: # / Title / Length / Notes; 01 / PANDAMAN / 4:00 / 01 Composed by: Masahiro Takami Arranged by: Yasuhisa Murase Vocal by: Mick Iriki Lyrics by: Shoko Fujibayashi 02 Composed by: Eri Takeda Arranged by: Eri Takeda Vocal by: Luffy (Mayumi Tanaka), Zoro (Kazuya Nakai), Nami (Akemi Okamura), Usopp (Kappei Yamaguchi), Sanji (Hiroaki Hirata) Lyrics by: Shoko Fujibayashi 03 Composed by: Kouhei Tanaka Arranged by: Yasunori Iwasaki Vocal by: Luffy (Mayumi Tanaka) Lyrics by: Shoko Fujibayashi 04 Composed by: Kouhei Tanaka Arranged by: Yasunori Iwasaki Vocal by: Nami (Akemi Okamura) Lyrics by: Shoko Fujibayashi 05 Composed by: Kouhei Tanaka Arranged by: Yasuhisa Murase Vocal by: Zoro (Kazuya Nakai) Lyrics by: Shoko Fujibayashi 06 Composed by: Masahiro Takami Arranged by: Naruhi Inaba Vocal by: Usopp (Kappei Yamaguchi) Lyrics by: Shoko Fujibayashi 07 Composed by: Kouhei Tanaka Arranged by: Yasuhisa Murase Vocal by: Sanji (Hiroaki Hirata) Lyrics by: Shoko Fujibayashi 08 Composed by: Masahiro Takami Arranged by: Naruhi Inaba Vocal by: Jango (Kazuki Yao) Lyrics by: Shoko Fujibayashi 09 Composed by: Masahiro Takami Arranged by: Masahiro Takami Vocal by: Luffy (Mayumi Tanaka), Zoro (Kazuya Nakai), Nami (Akemi Okamura), Usopp (Kappei Yamaguchi), Sanji (Hiroaki Hirata) Lyrics by: Shoko Fujibayashi 10 Composed by: Masahiro Takami Arranged by: Masahiro Takami Vocal by: Luffy (Mayumi Tanaka) Lyrics by: Shoko Fujibayashi 11, 14 Composed by: Kouhei Tanaka Arranged by: Kouhei Tanaka 12, 15, 17 Composed by: Kouhei Tanaka, Shiro Hamaguchi Arranged by: Kouhei Tanaka, Shiro Hamaguchi 13, 16, 18 Composed by: Shiro Hamaguchi Arranged by: Shiro Hamaguchi 19 Composed by: Kouhei Tanaka Arranged by: Takayuki Negishi Vocal by: Hiroshi Kitadani Lyrics by: Shoko Fujibayashi; 02 / HI! HO! READY GO! / 3:09; 03 / WANTED! / 4:16; 04 / MUSIC / 4:07; 05 / Spirit of ZORO / 3:52; 06 / Usopp☆Drop / 2:59; 07 / Sanji The Great Blue ~Dessert wa Kimi~ / 5:53; 08 / 1. 2. Jango! / 4:05; 09 / Samba Bomber - Devil Fruit / 2:39; 10 / Holy Holiday! / 4:09; 11 / Tony Tony Chopper / 3:43; 12 / Islands of the Grand Line-cold / 3:37; 13 / Islands of the Grand Line-hot / 3:12; 14 / Miss All Sunday / 2:20; 15 / Creatures of the Sea / 3:23; 16 / Silent Anger / 4:18; 17 / Serious Battle! / 3:48; 18 / Aim for One Piece! / 4:59; 19 / We Are! / 3:59; Disc length / / 72:28	19	72:28	Jul 20, 2001		
6	2001	ONE PIECE Grand Battle! 2 - Music & Song Collection: # / Title / Length / Notes; 01 / [We Are! GRAND BATTLE super-EX Ver.] Game Size Narration start / 1:58 / Volume 3 of the soundtrack album series of the PlayStation game based on the anime 'One Piece.' Contains a new version of the main theme song 'We Are!' which can only be heard on this disc. Also includes the music from 'Grand Battle!' and 'Tobidase Kaizokudan!' 2~18: Grand Battle! 2 BGM Collection 20~35: Grand Battle! BGM Collection 1/36 Composition: Kouhei Tanaka / Arrangement: Takayuki Negishi / Lyrics: Shoko Fujibayashi Vocals: Hiroshi Kitadani / Chorus: Taeko Saito, Kumi Sasaki, Junko Hirotani 18 Composition: Kouhei Tanaka / Arrangement: Takayuki Negishi / Lyrics: Shoko Fujibayashi Vocals: Hiroshi Kitadani / Chorus: Taeko Saito, Kumi Sasaki, Yuko Kawai 37 Composition: Kazuki Yao / Vocals: Kazuki Yao, Ikue Ohtani / Lyrics: Eiichiro Oda, Shoko Fujibayashi BGM: Yuichi Hirose Voice Actors: Mayumi Tanaka (Monkey D. Luffy); 02 / Even higher / 1:37; 03 / Select now! / 1:03; 04 / Country de Fosha / 1:40; 05 / Hill road with a sea breeze / 1:43; 06 / Welcome to Baratie / 1:19; 07 / Smooth Sailing / 1:13; 08 / Holiday in the Park / 1:52; 09 / Bell of Judgement / 2:20; 10 / Rabin Island / 1:43; 11 / What's the matter / 0:43; 12 / Soldier's isolation / 1:57; 13 / happiness Carillon / 1:38; 14 / Secret society Baroque works / 1:36; 15 / Training Training still Training! / 1:41; 16 / City of ancient times / 1:55; 17 / Alabaster Tours / 1:45; 18 / Crash! / 2:16; 19 / [We Are!] Full Size Narration beginning / 4:01; 20 / The adventure's beginning / 1:55; 21 / Choose Your Character / 1:34; 22 / Trumphful return! Fosha Village / 1:34; 23 / Let's Cross Over that Hill / 1:20; 24 / Baratie Boggle / 1:57; 25 / Rivalry / 0:52; 26 / With a mighty power / 1:04; 27 / Iza seikan / 0:39; 28 / Critical situation / 0:49; 29 / Paradise of the Fish People / 1:38; 30 / Logue Town Mariachi / 1:46; 31 / Desire for fun and also great trouble / 1:39; 32 / Are the preparations complete? / 0:46; 33 / Hall of Fame / 0:50; 34 / Fate / 1:57; 35 / Crushing / 1:02; 36 / [We Are! GRAND BATTLE super-EX Ver.] Full Size Version / 4:03; 37 / (Bonus Dialogue Track) Bon Kure no Uta / 3:17; Disc length / / 62:42	37	62:42	Dec 21, 2001	Video game	
7	2002	ONE PIECE Movie 3: Chopper's Kingdom on the Island of Strange Animals Music Collection: # / Title / Length / Notes; 01 / Suddenly, There's Crown Island! / 3:06 / BGM (01~33) Composed: Kohei Tanaka 34 Performed, Lyrics & Composed: DASEIN 35 Performed: Mayumi Tanaka (Luffy), Ikue Ohtani (Chopper) Lyrics: Shoko Fujibayashi Composed & Arranged: Yasumasa Sato 36 Performed: Folder5 Lyrics: Chiroru Yaho Composed & Arranged: GROOVE SURFERS Conductor: Kohei Tanaka Strings: Masatsugu Shinozaki Group Trumpet: Masahiko Sugasaka Group Trombone: Osamu Matsumoto Group Horn: Hiroshi Minami Group Flute: Takashi Asahi Oboe: Masakazu Ishibashi Clarinet: Tadashi Hoshino Percussion: Midori Takada, Tomoko Kusakari Piano: Masato Matsuda Bassoon: Masashi Maeda Synth Operator: Minoru Maruo Recording Engineer: Juji Nakamura Musician Coordinate: Toshiaki Ota (Velvet Line) Mastering Engineer: Tetsuya Yamamoto (avex studio), Rena Koyanagi (avex studio) Recording Studio: Sound City Mastering Studio: avex studio; 02 / Goro Goro Goro! Zun!! / 0:21; 03 / Chopper is Crowned King?! / 0:33; 04 / The Strange Animals Rejoice / 0:23; 05 / The Island of Strange Animals is Fun! / 1:37; 06 / Mobambi's Scar / 1:21; 07 / Butler's Violin / 2:21; 08 / Butler and His Henchman Appear! / 0:43; 09 / Chopper Will Be Fine / 0:50; 10 / To the Animal King's Place / 0:43; 11 / An Enemy is Coming! / 1:35; 12 / Eating in the Royal Dining Room / 0:57; 13 / Secret of the Crowning Treasure / 1:18; 14 / Usopp Boomerang! / 1:04; 15 / Run for it, Chopper! / 0:34; 16 / Follow Chopper! / 0:21; 17 / Watch out, Chopper! / 0:12; 18 / Chopper in a Pinch! / 1:19; 19 / Sanji vs Snake / 0:28; 20 / Zoro vs Hotdog / 0:27; 21 / Usopp & Nami's Plan / 1:34; 22 / Mobambi's Courage / 1:03; 23 / Luffy Arrives! / 0:26; 24 / Giant Beast Butler! / 0:45; 25 / Explosion! Sanji's Keeps On Kicking! / 0:24; 26 / Can Zoro Pull It Off!? / 0:21; 27 / Santoryu Tatsu Maki! / 1:05; 28 / Luffy vs Butler / 1:15; 29 / Kokutei Roseo! / 0:44; 30 / Mobambi's Determination / 0:50; 31 / Luffy's Rage! / 1:52; 32 / Friends / 1:33; 33 / The New Animal King / 1:06; 34 / Mabushikute / 1:53; 35 / Dr. Tony Tony Chopper / 3:37; 36 / Believe / 1:51; Disc length / / 40:32	36	40:32	Mar 13, 2002	Movie 3	
8	2003	One Piece: Oceans of Dreams! Shudaika: # / Title / Length / Notes; 01 / Family ~7 Member Straw Hat Pirates~ version / 3:56 / M01 - Theme song for Sony PlayStation RPG "One Piece: Oceans of Dreams" Arrangement: Yoshio Tsuru Vocals: 7-nin no Mugiwara Kaizokudan [7人の麦わら海賊団] (Mayumi Tanaka, Kappei Yamaguchi, Hiroaki Hirata, Kazuya Nakai, Akemi Okamura, Ikue Ohtani, Yuriko Yamaguchi) M02 - Character image song by Vivi Arrangement: Takayuki Negishi Vocals: Vivi (CV: Misa Watanabe) & Alabaster Doubutsu Gasshoudan [アラバスタ動物合唱団]; 02 / Wish upon a star / 3:53 / M01 - Theme song for Sony PlayStation RPG "One Piece: Oceans of Dreams" Arrangement: Yoshio Tsuru Vocals: 7-nin no Mugiwara Kaizokudan [7人の麦わら海賊団] (Mayumi Tanaka, Kappei Yamaguchi, Hiroaki Hirata, Kazuya Nakai, Akemi Okamura, Ikue Ohtani, Yuriko Yamaguchi) M02 - Character image song by Vivi Arrangement: Takayuki Negishi Vocals: Vivi (CV: Misa Watanabe) & Alabaster Doubutsu Gasshoudan [アラバスタ動物合唱団]; 03 / Family ~7 Member Straw Hat Pirates~ version (original karaoke) / 3:55 / M01 - Theme song for Sony PlayStation RPG "One Piece: Oceans of Dreams" Arrangement: Yoshio Tsuru Vocals: 7-nin no Mugiwara Kaizokudan [7人の麦わら海賊団] (Mayumi Tanaka, Kappei Yamaguchi, Hiroaki Hirata, Kazuya Nakai, Akemi Okamura, Ikue Ohtani, Yuriko Yamaguchi) M02 - Character image song by Vivi Arrangement: Takayuki Negishi Vocals: Vivi (CV: Misa Watanabe) & Alabaster Doubutsu Gasshoudan [アラバスタ動物合唱団]; 04 / Wish upon a star (original karaoke) / 3:50 / M01 - Theme song for Sony PlayStation RPG "One Piece: Oceans of Dreams" Arrangement: Yoshio Tsuru Vocals: 7-nin no Mugiwara Kaizokudan [7人の麦わら海賊団] (Mayumi Tanaka, Kappei Yamaguchi, Hiroaki Hirata, Kazuya Nakai, Akemi Okamura, Ikue Ohtani, Yuriko Yamaguchi) M02 - Character image song by Vivi Arrangement: Takayuki Negishi Vocals: Vivi (CV: Misa Watanabe) & Alabaster Doubutsu Gasshoudan [アラバスタ動物合唱団]; Disc length / / 15:34 / M01 - Theme song for Sony PlayStation RPG "One Piece: Oceans of Dreams" Arrangement: Yoshio Tsuru Vocals: 7-nin no Mugiwara Kaizokudan [7人の麦わら海賊団] (Mayumi Tanaka, Kappei Yamaguchi, Hiroaki Hirata, Kazuya Nakai, Akemi Okamura, Ikue Ohtani, Yuriko Yamaguchi) M02 - Character image song by Vivi Arrangement: Takayuki Negishi Vocals: Vivi (CV: Misa Watanabe) & Alabaster Doubutsu Gasshoudan [アラバスタ動物合唱団]	4	15:34	Feb 05, 2003	Video game	
9	2003	ONE PIECE THE MOVIE The Dead End Adventure MUSIC COLLECTION: # / Title / Length / Notes; 01 / Main Title ~ Port City Hannabal / 2:53 / Music Composed & Arranged: Kohei Tanaka (01,04~07,13, 15~17,19,21~26) Shiro Hamaguchi (02,03,08~12,14,18,20,27,28) 29 Performed: Ruppina Words: Mai Kudo Music: Fumio Yasuda Arrangement: Naoto Suzuki Conductor: Kohei Tanaka Strings: Hiroyuki Koike Group Trumpet: Masahiko Sugasaka Group Trombone: Osamu Matsumoto Group Horn: Otohiko Fujita Group Flute: Takashi Asahi, Yoshio Kizu Oboe: Masakazu Ishibashi Clarinet: Tadashi Hoshino Percussion: Midori Takada, Tomoko Kusakari Piano: Masato Matsuda Harp: Tomoyuki Asakawa Bassoon: Josuke Ohata Synth Operator: Minoru Maruo Recording Engineer: Juji Nakamura Musician Coordinate: Toshiaki Ota (Velvet Line), Eriko Noma (Velvet Line) Mastering Engineer: Tetsuya Yamamoto (a-studio), Rena Koyanagi (a-studio) Recording Studio: Sound City Trackdown Studio: APPO SOUND PROJECT Mastering Studio: a-studio; 02 / Underground Bar, Big Hole! / 3:05; 03 / Big Fight / 1:33; 04 / Gasparde / 0:55; 05 / Recruit / 1:43; 06 / Straw Hat / 0:58; 07 / Anaguma / 0:56; 08 / Morning of the Start / 1:23; 09 / The Wind's Coming! / 0:31; 10 / Dead End, Start! / 4:17; 11 / No-Rules Pirate Race / 1:04; 12 / The Going Merry Flies!! / 1:21; 13 / If You Live / 1:08; 14 / Fierce Fighting! Zoro & Sanji / 1:11; 15 / Resolution for Ambition / 1:10; 16 / Beat Gasparde! / 2:39; 17 / Shuraiya's Past / 0:29; 18 / Shuraiya vs Needles / 0:42; 19 / Gasparde's Power / 1:20; 20 / Luffy's Here! / 1:21; 21 / Alive! / 0:23; 22 / Luffy vs Gasparde / 2:21; 23 / Torn Straw Hat / 2:22; 24 / Approaching Cyclone / 0:31; 25 / Boiler Room, Countdown to Explosion!! / 0:54; 26 / A Real Pirate!!! / 2:47; 27 / Life's Interesting / 1:59; 28 / Set Sail / 1:55; 29 / Free Will (TV Size) / 1:44; Disc length / / 45:35	29	45:35	Mar 05, 2003	Movie 4	
10	2003	One Piece - Der offizielle Soundtrack zur TV-Serie: # / Title / Length / Notes; 01 / Die Legende / 3:17 / Official Soundtrack for the German TV-Series Composed by: Andy Knote (1, 2, 3, 5, 6, 7, 8, 9, 10, 11, 12, 13, 14) Noel Pix (1, 2, 3, 5, 7, 10, 11, 13, 14) Frank Schindel (4) Matthias Borst (4) Chris "Yps" Limburg (8, 9) Vocals by: Noel Pix (1, 3, 5, 13, 14) Fred Röttcher (2, 12) Frank Schindel (4) Tina Frank (6) Petra Scheeser (7) Alex Wesselsky (8) Andy Barsekow (9) Ruth Kirchner (10) Lyrics by: Andy Knote (1, 2, 3, 5, 6, 7, 8, 9, 11, 12, 13, 14) Noel Pix (1) Henk Flemming (2, 3, 5, 7, 8, 9, 11) Frank Schindel (4) Matthias Borst (4) Guitar by: Noel Pix (1, 2, 3, 5, 7, 10, 11, 13, 14) Matthias Borst (4) Didi Holesch (6, 12) Chris "Yps" Limburg (8, 9) Keyboards & Programming: Andy Knote (1, 2, 3, 5, 6, 7, 8, 9, 10, 11, 12, 13, 14) Frank Schindel (4) Matthias Borst (4); 02 / Grandline / 4:06; 03 / Deine Zeit wird enden / 4:31; 04 / Ich werde wie du / 4:00; 05 / Alles / 4:04; 06 / Irgendwann / 3:47; 07 / Du wirst niemals untergehen / 4:08; 08 / Die Nacht am Meer / 3:36; 09 / Rainbase / 4:19; 10 / Der Schatz des Ozeans / 2:27; 11 / See der Legenden / 3:17; 12 / Bei dir sein / 3:47; 13 / Die Legende (TV-Edit) / 1:53; 14 / Die Legende (Karaoke Version) / 3:17; Disc length / / 50:29	14	50:29	Jun 13, 2003	TV Anime (German)	
11	2003	ONE PIECE BEST ALBUM - One Piece Shudaikashuu: # / Title / Length / Notes; 01 / We Are! / 4:03 / M-01 - TV Opening 1, Movie 1 Opening Performed by Hiroshi Kitadani Lyrics by Shoko Fujibayashi Composed by Kohei Tanaka Arranged by Takayuki Negishi M-02 - TV Opening 2, "Movie 2: Nejimaki-jima no Bouken" Theme Song Performed by Folder5 Lyrics by Chiroru Yaho Composed/arranged by GROOVE SURFERS M-03 - TV Ending 1, Movie 1 Ending Performed/lyrics by Maki Otsuki Composed/arranged by Junta Mori M-04 - TV Ending 2 Performed by Maki Otsuki Lyrics by Maki Otsuki Composed/arranged by Junta Mori M-05 - TV Ending 3 Performed by TOMATO CUBE Lyrics by Chisato Nishimura Composed by Matto Yamamoto Arranged by TOMATO CUBE, Kaoru Yamauchi M-06 - TV Ending 4 Performed by Suitei Shoujo Lyrics by Yasushi Akimoto Composed/arranged by Hajime Hyakkoku M-07 - "Movie 2 Special Short Movie: Jango no Dance Carnival" Theme Song Performed by Folder5 Lyrics by Chihiro Close Composed/arranged by GROOVE SURFERS M-08 - "Movie 3: Chinjuu-jima no Chopper Oukoku" Theme Song Performed/lyrics/composed by DASEIN Arranged by Nobuhiko Kashiwara M-09 - TV Ending 5 Performed by AI-SACHI Lyrics by Mikako Sato Composed/arranged by Nobuhiko Sato M-10 - TV Ending 6 Performed by The Kaleidoscope Lyrics by Takumi Ishida Composed by Takumi Ishida Arranged by The Kaleidoscope, Yu Imai M-11 - TV Ending 7 Performed by Takako Uehara Lyrics by Natsumi Watanabe Composed by Kazuhito Kikuchi Arranged by Ken Harada M-12 - TV Ending 8 Performed/arranged by Janne Da Arc Lyrics/composed by yasu Arranged by Hajime Okano M-13 - TV Ending 9 Performed by Ruppina Lyrics by Mai Kudo Composed by Fumio Yasuda Arranged by Naoto Suzuki M-14 - PS Game "One Piece: Oceans of Dreams" Theme Song Performed by 7-nin no Mugiwara Kaizokudan (Mayumi Tanaka, Kazuya Nakai, Akemi Okamura, Kappei Yamaguchi, Hiroaki Hirata, Ikue Ohtani, Yuriko Yamaguchi) Lyrics by Shoko Fujibayashi Composed by Kohei Tanaka Arranged by Yoshio Tsuru; 02 / Believe / 3:49; 03 / memories / 4:26; 04 / RUN! RUN! RUN! / 4:01; 05 / Watashi ga Iru yo / 3:59; 06 / Shouchi no Suke / 3:55; 07 / Ready! / 4:03; 08 / Mabushikute / 4:29; 09 / BEFORE DAWN / 3:20; 10 / fish / 4:26; 11 / GLORY -Kimi ga Iru kara / 4:58; 12 / Shining ray / 4:02; 13 / Free Will / 4:50; 14 / Family ~Shichinin no Mugiwara Kaizokudan Hen~ / 3:53; Disc length / / 58:14	14	58:14	Jul 30, 2003	Theme songs	
12	2003	A to Z ~One Piece Edition~ / ZZ: # / Title / Length / Notes; 01 / A to Z ~ONE PIECE Edition~ / 3:36 / M-01: TV Anime "One Piece" 12th Ending Theme M-01~06 Lyrics by SOTARO Composed/arranged by ZZ [ GUEST MUSICIANS ] Turn Table: DJ BASS Chorus: AKINA Manipulator: ZENKYU SHIRAKAWA Recording & Mixing Engineer: HIRONOBU ASANO (REDEFINE) Mastering Engineer: SHUJI KITAMURA (AUDIO CITY); 02 / I'll be back again / 4:13 / M-01: TV Anime "One Piece" 12th Ending Theme M-01~06 Lyrics by SOTARO Composed/arranged by ZZ [ GUEST MUSICIANS ] Turn Table: DJ BASS Chorus: AKINA Manipulator: ZENKYU SHIRAKAWA Recording & Mixing Engineer: HIRONOBU ASANO (REDEFINE) Mastering Engineer: SHUJI KITAMURA (AUDIO CITY); 03 / A to Z / 4:26 / M-01: TV Anime "One Piece" 12th Ending Theme M-01~06 Lyrics by SOTARO Composed/arranged by ZZ [ GUEST MUSICIANS ] Turn Table: DJ BASS Chorus: AKINA Manipulator: ZENKYU SHIRAKAWA Recording & Mixing Engineer: HIRONOBU ASANO (REDEFINE) Mastering Engineer: SHUJI KITAMURA (AUDIO CITY); 04 / A to Z ~ONE PIECE Edition~ (Back Track) / 3:35 / M-01: TV Anime "One Piece" 12th Ending Theme M-01~06 Lyrics by SOTARO Composed/arranged by ZZ [ GUEST MUSICIANS ] Turn Table: DJ BASS Chorus: AKINA Manipulator: ZENKYU SHIRAKAWA Recording & Mixing Engineer: HIRONOBU ASANO (REDEFINE) Mastering Engineer: SHUJI KITAMURA (AUDIO CITY); 05 / I'll be back again (Back Track) / 4:12 / M-01: TV Anime "One Piece" 12th Ending Theme M-01~06 Lyrics by SOTARO Composed/arranged by ZZ [ GUEST MUSICIANS ] Turn Table: DJ BASS Chorus: AKINA Manipulator: ZENKYU SHIRAKAWA Recording & Mixing Engineer: HIRONOBU ASANO (REDEFINE) Mastering Engineer: SHUJI KITAMURA (AUDIO CITY); 06 / A to Z (Karaoke Version) / 4:34 / M-01: TV Anime "One Piece" 12th Ending Theme M-01~06 Lyrics by SOTARO Composed/arranged by ZZ [ GUEST MUSICIANS ] Turn Table: DJ BASS Chorus: AKINA Manipulator: ZENKYU SHIRAKAWA Recording & Mixing Engineer: HIRONOBU ASANO (REDEFINE) Mastering Engineer: SHUJI KITAMURA (AUDIO CITY); Disc length / / 24:36 / M-01: TV Anime "One Piece" 12th Ending Theme M-01~06 Lyrics by SOTARO Composed/arranged by ZZ [ GUEST MUSICIANS ] Turn Table: DJ BASS Chorus: AKINA Manipulator: ZENKYU SHIRAKAWA Recording & Mixing Engineer: HIRONOBU ASANO (REDEFINE) Mastering Engineer: SHUJI KITAMURA (AUDIO CITY)	6	24:36	Nov 12, 2003	Songs	
13	2004	BON VOYAGE! / BON-BON BLANCO: # / Title / Length / Notes; 01 / BON VOYAGE! / 4:29 / M-01: TV Anime "One Piece" 4th Opening Theme M-01, 03 Lyrics by PANINARO 30 Composed/arranged by Kohsuke Oshima M-02 Lyrics by RINRIN Composed by Toshiaki Arranged by Masazumi Ozawa; 02 / Arigatou I Love You, Yet... / 3:01 / M-01: TV Anime "One Piece" 4th Opening Theme M-01, 03 Lyrics by PANINARO 30 Composed/arranged by Kohsuke Oshima M-02 Lyrics by RINRIN Composed by Toshiaki Arranged by Masazumi Ozawa; 03 / BON VOYAGE! (Instrumental) / 4:28 / M-01: TV Anime "One Piece" 4th Opening Theme M-01, 03 Lyrics by PANINARO 30 Composed/arranged by Kohsuke Oshima M-02 Lyrics by RINRIN Composed by Toshiaki Arranged by Masazumi Ozawa; 04 / BON VOYAGE! Promotion Video (Short Version)/member chokuhitu profile / 7:01 / M-01: TV Anime "One Piece" 4th Opening Theme M-01, 03 Lyrics by PANINARO 30 Composed/arranged by Kohsuke Oshima M-02 Lyrics by RINRIN Composed by Toshiaki Arranged by Masazumi Ozawa; Disc length / / 18:59 / M-01: TV Anime "One Piece" 4th Opening Theme M-01, 03 Lyrics by PANINARO 30 Composed/arranged by Kohsuke Oshima M-02 Lyrics by RINRIN Composed by Toshiaki Arranged by Masazumi Ozawa	4	18:59	Jan 14, 2004	Theme song	
14	2004	ONE PIECE Movie 5: The Curse of the Sacred Sword Soundtrack: # / Title / Length / Notes; 01 / Cursed Sword / 1:51 / BGM (1~47) Composed & Arranged: Kohei Tanaka (01~03,08,10,12,15~17,22,23,27,31,32,34,37,39,40,42,45) Shiro Hamaguchi (04~07,09,11,13,14,18~21,24~26,28~30,33,35,36,38,41,43,44,46,47) TALK (48~52) CAST: Mayumi Tanaka, Kazuya Nakai, Akemi Okamura, Kappei Yamaguchi, Hiroaki Hirata, Ikue Ohtani, Yuriko Yamaguchi Conductor: Kohei Tanaka Strings: Hiroyuki Koike Group Piano: Masato Matsuda Classic Percussion: Midori Takada, Tamao Fujii Trumpet: Masao Terashima Group Trombone: Osamu Matsumoto Group Horn: Otohiko Fujita Group Cello: Ryosuke Kashiwada Flute: Takashi Asahi, Yoshio Kizu Oboe: Masakazu Ishibashi Clarinet: Tadashi Hoshino Bassoon: Josuke Ohata Harp: Yo Saito Synth Operator: Minoru Maruo [まるおみのる] Recording Engineer: Juji Nakamura Musician Coordinate: 太田敏明 (ベルベットライン), 野間愛理子 (ベルベットライン) Recording Studio: Sound City Trackdown Studio: APPO SOUND PROJECT Mastering Studio: avex-studio Mastering Engineer: Rena Koyanagi; 02 / Legend of the Seven-Star Sword / 0:53; 03 / Zoro's Short Sword / 0:14; 04 / Greeted by a Swordsman / 0:35; 05 / Run for It! / 2:25; 06 / The Merry in Danger / 0:15; 07 / Master of the Marine Dojo, Saga / 1:13; 08 / Priestess Maya / 1:21; 09 / O~i! / 0:42; 10 / Pirates! / 0:37; 11 / Marines Attack the Village / 1:00; 12 / And Zoro is with Them... / 1:08; 13 / Luffy VS Saga / 0:51; 14 / The Seven-Star Sword is Drawn / 1:17; 15 / Luffy in Danger / 0:44; 16 / Battle Scars / 1:36; 17 / Doubt / 0:53; 18 / Rolling Boulder! / 0:21; 19 / A Trap!? / 0:14; 20 / Straw Hat Cave Exploration Team / 1:39; 21 / War Cry of the Marine Swordsmen / 1:50; 22 / Legend / 1:26; 23 / The Tragic Priestess / 1:39; 24 / The Sword of the Vow / 0:39; 25 / Zoro & Saga / 0:37; 26 / Saga's Dire Situation / 0:30; 27 / Maya's Tears / 2:15; 28 / Water! / 0:14; 29 / We're Out!! / 0:11; 30 / Well, well / 0:15; 31 / Maya's Powerful Emotions / 2:17; 32 / Purification / 0:51; 33 / Into Action! / 1:00; 34 / Toma's Sincerity / 1:17; 35 / Suspicious Saga / 1:36; 36 / Zoro VS Saga / 1:06; 37 / The Demon Snake Strikes!! / 0:57; 38 / The Three Towers / 1:28; 39 / Emperor of Darkness / 1:05; 40 / The Power of Prayer / 0:39; 41 / Luffy's Fierce Attack! / 1:08; 42 / The Time has Finally Come! / 1:01; 43 / Power of the Red Moon / 1:01; 44 / The Very, Very, Very Strongest!!! / 1:48; 45 / I Will Kill Him... / 2:36; 46 / The Hearts of Mankind / 1:23; 47 / The Vow / 0:43; 48 / You Know Them as the Seven Straw Hats / 0:39; 49 / Zoro VS Saga... Right After / 3:00; 50 / Disaster Even for the Straw Hat Pirates!? / 1:06; 51 / What Will the Next Movie be Like!?? / 3:19; 52 / One Piece Will Live Forever!!!! / 6:28; Disc length / / 65:53	52	65:53	Mar 10, 2004	Movie 5	
15	2005	ONE PIECE Baron Omatsuri and Secret Island SOUND TRACK: # / Title / Length / Notes; 01 / Resort Island / 2:06 / Music: Kohei Tanaka & IMAGINE PROJECT Music Composed & Arranged: Kohei Tanaka (01,06~08,10~12,17,20~22,26,27) Minoru Maruo (02~05,09,16,18,19) Kazuhiko Sawaguchi (13~15,23~25) Conductor: Koji Haishima Strings: Hiroyuki Koike Group Piano: Masato Matsuda Classic Percussion: Midori Takada, Tamao Fujii Trumpet: Masahiko Sugasaka Group Trombone: Osamu Matsumoto Group Horn: Otohiko Fujita Group Tuba: Kiyoshi Sato Flute: Hideyo Takakuwa Oboe: Masakazu Ishibashi Clarinet: Tadashi Hoshino Harp: Risako Hayakawa Fue [笛]: Takashi Asahi Latin Percussion: Mataro Misawa, Ikuo Kakehashi Synth Operator: Minoru Maruo [まるおみのる] Musician Coordinate: 太田敏明 (ベルベットライン) Recording Engineer: Juji Nakamura Recording Studio: Sound City, Boomerang Studio Trackdown Studio: APPO SOUND PROJECT Mastering Studio: avex-studio Mastering Engineer: Rena Koyanagi; 02 / Baron Omatsuri Appears / 1:55; 03 / Let's Goldfish Catch! / 1:21; 04 / Master Usopp! / 0:45; 05 / Fish!! The Giant Goldfish, Rosario / 3:10; 06 / Sinkining... / 1:02; 07 / Let's Ring Toss! / 3:29; 08 / Floating Fire Battle / 1:05; 09 / Choco-maka Chase / 0:40; 10 / Be Careful / 1:16; 11 / Open the Rescue Box! / 3:16; 12 / Zoro VS Kerojii / 3:13; 13 / Behold! The Magnificent Dinner Party / 1:19; 14 / Let's Iron Griddle! / 0:22; 15 / Sanji VS Kotetsu / 2:10; 16 / Nami and Muchi / 2:18; 17 / That's a Flower! / 2:42; 18 / The Straw Hats, Destroyed / 1:16; 19 / Let's Shooting!...No One's Laughing! / 1:46; 20 / The Green Terror / 2:42; 21 / Trembling in Fear / 0:49; 22 / Thoughts Don't Reach Far Enough / 2:20; 23 / I'm Here With You Too / 1:26; 24 / I'll Never Let You Hurt My Nakama!!! / 1:16; 25 / Deul that Defies Description / 2:12; 26 / First Binding Arrow / 1:21; 27 / Every Kind Person is a Hero / 1:25; Disc length / / 48:42	27	48:42	Mar 02, 2005	Movie 6	
16	2005	ONE PIECE BEST ALBUM One Piece Shudaikashuu 2nd Piece / Limited Edition: # / Title / Length / Notes; Disc 1 / / / [Disc 1] M-01 - TV Opening 3, "TV Special Episode 3: Mamore! Saigo no Oobutai" Opening Performed/arranged by The babystars Lyrics/composed by Akihito Tanaka M-02 - TV Opening 4, "TV Special Episode 4: Nenmatsu Tokubetsu Kikaku! Mugiwara no Luffy Oyabun Torimonochou" Opening Performed by BON-BON BLANCO Lyrics by PANINARO 30 Composed/arranged by KOHSUKE OSHIMA M-03 - "One Piece Movie 5: Norowareta Seiken" Theme Song Performed by hare_ḧare Lyrics by 松浦友也, Hiroyuki Uchida Composed by 松浦友也 Arranged by Masao Akashi M-04 - TV Ending 10 Performed by Ruppina Lyrics by Mai Kudo Composed by Fumio Yasuda Arranged by Naoto Suzuki M-05 - TV Ending 11 Performed/composed/arranged by ZZ Lyrics by SOTARO M-06 - TV Ending 12 Performed by shela Lyrics by Jun Takigawa [瀧川潤] Composed by Jun Takigawa Arranged by Masaki Iehara M-07 - TV Ending 13 Performed/lyrics by Aiko Ikuta Composed by ACKO Arranged by TEXAS TAXIS M-08 - TV Opening 1, Movie 1 Theme Song Performed by Hiroshi Kitadani Lyrics by Shoko Fujibayashi Composed by Kohei Tanaka Arranged by Takayuki Negishi M-09 - TV Opening 2, "Movie 2: Nejimaki-jima no Bouken" Theme Song Performed by Folder5 Lyrics by Chiroru Yaho Composed/arranged by GROOVE SURFERS M-10 - Game "ONE PIECE Ocean's Dream!" Theme Song Performed by 7-nin no Mugiwara Kaizokudan (Mayumi Tanaka, Kazuya Nakai, Akemi Okamura, Kappei Yamaguchi, Hiroaki Hirata, Ikue Ohtani, Yuriko Yamaguchi) Lyrics by Shoko Fujibayashi Composed by Kohei Tanaka Arranged by Yoshio Tsuru M-11 Performed by 7-nin no Mugiwara Kaizokudan (Mayumi Tanaka, Kazuya Nakai, Akemi Okamura, Kappei Yamaguchi, Hiroaki Hirata, Ikue Ohtani, Yuriko Yamaguchi) Lyrics by Shoko Fujibayashi Composed by Kohei Tanaka Arranged by Yasunori Iwasaki M-12 - TV Opening 7 Performed by 7-nin no Mugiwara Kaizokudan (Mayumi Tanaka, Kazuya Nakai, Akemi Okamura, Kappei Yamaguchi, Hiroaki Hirata, Ikue Ohtani, Yuriko Yamaguchi) Lyrics by Shoko Fujibayashi Composed by Kohei Tanaka Arranged by Takayuki Negishi; 01 / Hikari e / 3:45; 02 / BON VOYAGE! / 4:31; 03 / Ano Basho e / 4:01; 04 / FAITH / 4:19; 05 / A to Z ~ONE PIECE Edition~ / 3:37; 06 / Tsuki to Taiyou / 5:13; 07 / DREAMSHIP / 4:44; 08 / We Are! / 4:02; 09 / Believe / 3:49; 10 / Family ~7-nin no Mugiwara Kaizokudanhen~ (Bonus Track) / 3:56; 11 / Jungle fever ~Kaizoku no Kaizoku ni yoru Kaizoku no Tame no Kanshasai (Bonus Track) / 4:44; 12 / We Are! ~7-nin no Mugiwara Kaizokudanhen (Bonus Track) / 4:17; Disc length / / 50:58; Disc 2 (Limited Edition): 01 / We Are! (Non-telop OP); 02 / Believe (Non-telop OP); 03 / Hikari e (Non-telop OP); 04 / Bon Voyage! (Non-telop OP); 05 / Odaiba Bouken'ou Going Merry-gou Eizou	Disc 1 - 12 Disc 2 - 5	50:58	Mar 24, 2005	Theme songs	
17	2006	ONE PIECE Mega Mecha Soldier of Karakuri Castle Soundtrack: # / Title / Length / Notes; 01 / In Front of Our Eyes, a Treasure Chest... / 1:45 / Music Composed & Arranged: Kohei Tanaka (01,02,04~06,09,10,12,18~25,28~30,32,37~39) Yasunori Iwasaki (07,08,11,13~17,26,27,31,33~36) Composed by Kohei Tanaka & Arranged by Yasunori Iwasaki (03) Performed: Kohei Tanaka (06,18) Lyrics: 伊藤正弘 (06,18) Conductor: Kohei Tanaka Strings: Hiroyuki Koike Piano: Hidetoshi Yamada Classic Percussion: Midori Takada, Tomoko Kusakari Trumpet: Masahiko Sugasaka Group Trombone: Osamu Matsumoto Group Horn: Hiroshi Minami Group Tuba: Kiyoshi Sato Flute: Takashi Asahi Oboe: Masakazu Ishibashi Clarinet: Masashi Togame Fagotto: Rie Tsukahara Harp: Satomi Kobayashi Synth Operator: Minoru Maruo Recording Engineer: Juji Nakamura Recording Studio: Sound City Trackdown Studio: APPO SOUND PROJECT Mastering Studio: Bunkamura Studio Mastering Engineer: Junji Koizumi; 02 / Treasure Chest, Open / 0:33; 03 / Golden Crown / 0:18; 04 / Turtle Pose / 0:55; 05 / On the Route To the Mechanical Island / 1:33; 06 / Yurari Song / 1:41; 07 / Karakuri Defense System, Activate! / 1:05; 08 / Karakuri Defense System, Deploy! / 1:33; 09 / The Golden Crown... Solving the Yurari Song Mystery / 1:23; 10 / The White Snake's Eye / 0:47; 11 / And Ratchet, Pursuing the Two Moons / 1:01; 12 / The Puzzling Mouth Is Opened! / 1:22; 13 / Ratchet, Commencing Action / 0:42; 14 / Karakuri Castle Party / 0:45; 15 / Ratchet's Appearance / 0:41; 16 / Nami Versus Ratchet / 1:07; 17 / Luffy and Ratchet, Tight Handshake / 0:28; 18 / Yurari Song (Original Karaoke) / 1:40; 19 / One Danger After Another / 1:47; 20 / The Lake and the Mysterious Stone Statues / 1:06; 21 / Very Soon, the Answer Will Be There / 1:31; 22 / Something Terrible Awakens! / 0:53; 23 / It Awakens! / 0:58; 24 / The Island's History / 1:28; 25 / The Golden Crown Exists! / 0:27; 26 / Ratchet's Ambition / 0:41; 27 / Karakuri Castle, Transform! / 2:03; 28 / Straw Hat Pirates, Begin Counterattack! / 1:26; 29 / A Mother's Love / 2:06; 30 / Keep Looking For the Golden Crown! / 0:33; 31 / Giant Stronghold, Takeoff!! / 2:51; 32 / Karakuri On Guard! / 0:38; 33 / Luffy Versus Ratchet Round 1 / 1:15; 34 / Zoro Versus General Maji / 0:51; 35 / Sanji Versus Captain Honki / 0:45; 36 / Luffy Versus Ratchet Round 2 / 1:00; 37 / I Won't Fall To Something Like This / 1:02; 38 / Karakuri Castle's Total Destruction!!! / 1:26; 39 / It's the Golden Crown! / 0:55; Disc length / / 45:01	39	45:01	Mar 01, 2006	Movie 7	
18	2007	From TV animation ONE PIECE Eizou Ongaku Kanzenban: # / Title / Length / Notes; Disc 1 / / / Disc.1 03, 05(1,2,4), 06(1,2), 07, 09(1), 11(1), 12, 14, 16(1), 20(1), 22(2,3) Composed & Arranged by: Kohei Tanaka 06(3,4), 09(2,3), 10, 11(2), 16(2,3), 17, 19, 20 (2,3,4), 22(1) Composed & Arranged by: Shiro Hamaguchi 02, 05(3) Composed by: Kohei Tanaka Arranged by: Shiro Hamaguchi 01 Composed by: Kohei Tanaka Arranged by: Takayuki Negishi Vocal by: Hiroshi Kitadani Lyrics by: Shoko Fujibayashi 08 Composed by: Kohei Tanaka Arranged by: Yasuhisa Murase Vocal by: Kazuya Nakai Lyrics by: Shoko Fujibayashi 13 Composed by: Kohei Tanaka Arranged by: Yasunori Iwasaki Vocal by: Mayumi Tanaka Lyrics by: Shoko Fujibayashi 15 TV size version of song 01 18 Composed by: Masahiro Takami Arranged by: Naruhi Inaba Vocal by: Kappei Yamaguchi Lyrics by: Shoko Fujibayashi 21 Composed by: Masahiro Takami Arranged by: Naruhi Inaba Vocal by: Kazuki Yao Lyrics by: Shoko Fujibayashi Disc.2 01(1), 02(1,3), 03(1,2), 04, 05, 06, 07, 09, 11, 12, 13, 14, 15(1,2,3), 16(2), 17(1,2), 18, 19(2), 22, 23 Composed & Arranged by: Kohei Tanaka 01(2), 02(2,4), 15(4), 16(1), 17(3,4), 19(1), 20, 21, Composed & Arranged by: Shiro Hamaguchi 03(3) Composed by: Kohei Tanaka Arranged by: Shiro Hamaguchi 08 Composed by: Masahiro Takami Arranged by: Masahiro Takami Vocal by: Ikue Ohtani Lyrics by: Shoko Fujibayashi 10 Composed by: Kohei Tanaka Arranged by: Yasuhisa Murase Vocal by: Hiroaki Hirata Lyrics by: Shoko Fujibayashi Disc.3 03(2), 04, 05(1), 07, 10, 12, 14(2), 15(1,2), 16(1), 17(1,2), 21, 22 Composed & Arranged by: Kohei Tanaka 02, 03(3), 14(1), 15(3), 16(2), 17(3), 18, 19, 20, Composed & Arranged by: Shiro Hamaguchi 03(1), 05(2,3) Composed by: Kohei Tanaka Arranged by: Shiro Hamaguchi 06 Composed by: Masahiro Takami Arranged by: Yasunori Iwasaki Vocal by: Hiroshi Kitadani Lyrics by: Shoko Fujibayashi 08 Composed by: Kohei Tanaka Arranged by: Yasunori Iwasaki Vocal by: Akemi Okamura Lyrics by: Shoko Fujibayashi 09 Composed by: Eri Takeda Arranged by: Eri Takeda Vocal by: Mayumi Tanaka, Kazuya Nakai, Akemi Okamura, Kappei Yamaguchi, Hiroaki Hirata Lyrics by: Shoko Fujibayashi 11 Composed by: Masahiro Takami Arranged by: Masahiro Takami Vocal by: Mayumi Tanaka Lyrics by: Shoko Fujibayashi 13 Composed by: Eri Takeda Arranged by: Eri Takeda Vocal by: 麦わら海賊団 (Mayumi Tanaka, Kazuya Nakai, Akemi Okamura, Kappei Yamaguchi, Hiroaki Hirata) Lyrics by: Shoko Fujibayashi; 01 / We Are! / 4:00; 02 / We Did It! Party! / 2:37; 03 / To The Grand Line / 3:44; 04 / Duel!! / 3:28; 05 / Luffy / 4:40; 06 / To The Ocean / 2:32; 07 / Zoro / 4:50; 08 / Spirit of ZORO / 3:52; 09 / Pirate / 3:32; 10 / Overtaken / 3:10; 11 / We Did It! / 2:18; 12 / I'm Becoming the King of Pirates / 2:09; 13 / WANTED / 4:17; 14 / More and Yet More, The Adventure Continues! / 0:33; 15 / We Are! (TV Size) / 1:52; 16 / Village Harbor / 2:17; 17 / Landing At Town / 3:27; 18 / Usopp Drop / 2:59; 19 / Angry / 2:07; 20 / Stealthy Night Shadow / 6:43; 21 / 1.2.Jango / 4:06; 22 / Desperate Situation / 4:18; Disc length / / 73:31; Disc 2: 01 / Can't Escape, Fight! / 3:06; 02 / Sanji's Feast / 3:56; 03 / GomuGomu vs GoeGoe / 3:03; 04 / The World's Number One Oden Store / 2:48; 05 / Uunan and the Stone Storage Room / 2:03; 06 / Departure of the Pirate King / 1:39; 07 / Message from Uunan / 2:59; 08 / See Moon See you / 4:05; 09 / Sanji / 2:24; 10 / Sanji The Great Blue ~ Dessert Kimi / 5:52; 11 / Hungry Luffy / 3:11; 12 / On The Shore! Golden Island / 1:36; 13 / EruDrago Appears / 1:43; 14 / Escape / 3:31; 15 / If There Are Storms There Are Stars Too / 5:50; 16 / After Eating, Grand Line! / 2:19; 17 / Mother Sea / 3:55; 18 / Fury!! / 3:22; 19 / The Fight Continues / 2:40; 20 / Difficult / 3:20; 21 / One Hour Evacuation / 2:13; 22 / Explosion! Sonic Wave!! / 1:50; 23 / A Reliable Friend! / 3:21; Disc length / / 70:46; Disc 3: 01 / We Are! (Instrumental) / 4:01; 02 / I Can't Lose! / 3:19; 03 / GomuGomu Bazooka!! / 4:00; 04 / Gold and Oden / 2:30; 05 / Luffy's Pace / 3:57; 06 / Jolly Roger with a Straw Hat / 3:08; 07 / Nami / 3:22; 08 / MUSIC / 4:08; 09 / HI!HO!READY GO! / 3:09; 10 / Usopp! It's Dangerous! / 3:09; 11 / Holy Holiday / 4:09; 12 / Food Fight / 1:39; 13 / Sanba Banba Akuma no Mi / 2:39; 14 / Grand Line Island (Cold) / 3:38; 15 / Tony Tony Chopper / 3:44; 16 / Sea Monster / 3:23; 17 / Serious Match / 3:48; 18 / Quiet Anger / 4:18; 19 / Mezase One Piece! / 5:01; 20 / Grand Line Island (Hot) / 3:12; 21 / Miss All Sunday / 2:20; 22 / The Great Pirate of Gold, Uunan / 1:42; Disc length / / 74:16	Disc 1 - 22 Disc 2 - 23 Disc 3 - 22	218:33	Jan 31, 2007	Compilation	
19	2007	ONE PIECE Movie 8 "Episode of Alabasta: The Desert Princess and the Pirates" Soundtrack: # / Title / Length / Notes; 01 / Yuuzora o Pell no Se ni Notte / 1:24 / NEW MUSIC Composed & Arranged: Kohei Tanaka (01,08,12,17,26,45~48,54) Chronological Movie Music Composed & Arranged: Kohei Tanaka (02~04,06,07,09,10,13,16, 20~25,27,28,30,31,36,37,39~42,44,49,52,53) Shiro Hamaguchi (14,19,29,32,34,35,50,51) Yasunori Iwasaki (11,15,18,38,43) Minoru Maruo (05) Kazuhiko Sawaguchi (33) 55 (instrumental) Composed & Lyrics: Ai Kawashima Arranged: Mugiwara Kaizokudan [麦藁海賊団] Musicians Conductor: Kohei Tanaka Strings: Hiroyuki Koike Group Piano: Masato Matsuda Classic Percussion: Midori Takada Trumpet: Masahiko Sugasaka Group Trombone: Osamu Matsumoto Group Horn: Hiroyuki Minami Group Tuba: Kiyoshi Sato Flute: Takashi Asahi, Yukihiko Nishizawa Oboe: Masakazu Ishibashi Clarinet: Tadashi Hoshino Harp: Tomoyuki Asakawa Synthe Operator: Minoru Maruo Recording Engineer: Juji Nakamura Recording Studio: Sound City Trackdown Studio: APPO SOUND PROJECT Mastering Studio: form THE MASTER Mastering Engineer: Rena Koyanagi; 02 / Kikisemaru Koza / 0:14; 03 / Bon Clay to Vivi / 0:43; 04 / Luffy ga Futari!? / 0:38; 05 / Mane Mane no Mi no Nouryoku / 0:39; 06 / Inbou / 2:38; 07 / Eiyuu Crocodile / 0:34; 08 / Nakama no Shirushi / 1:06; 09 / Toto-ojisan / 0:42; 10 / Osanaki Hi no Yakusoku / 0:51; 11 / Baroque Works / 1:02; 12 / Oretachi no Inochi kurai Kakete Miro!!! / 1:19; 13 / Hanrangun vs Kokuougun, Shoutotsu Sunzen / 0:47; 14 / Tagai o Shinji, Sorezore no Michi e / 1:28; 15 / Luffy vs Crocodile / 2:52; 16 / Tsuzuku Gekitou / 1:54; 17 / Nami no Sexy / 0:26; 18 / Rokunin no Vivi / 1:33; 19 / Vivi no Koe wa Koza ni...! / 1:51; 20 / Fukutsu no Vivi to Carue / 1:07; 21 / Sorezore no Battle / 1:05; 22 / Sensou / 1:19; 23 / Gyakuten! Usopp & Chopper / 1:28; 24 / Mikitta ze, Mane Mane no Mi / 1:11; 25 / Gekitou! Sanji / 1:42; 26 / Kuni wa Hito nari / 0:31; 27 / Crocodile Shutsugen / 0:28; 28 / Shiretsu! Nami / 1:06; 29 / Hakunetsu! Zoro / 1:49; 30 / Senkyou / 0:28; 31 / Ato 15-fun de Hougeki / 0:54; 32 / Shugoshin Jacal / 1:01; 33 / Omae ni Kuni wa Sukuenai / 2:11; 34 / Luffy Toujou! / 1:20; 35 / Fukutsu no Mugiwara Kaizokudan / 1:20; 36 / Crocodile wa Shinazu / 1:19; 37 / Kaeshite Morau, Kuni! / 2:19; 38 / Taihou wa Tokeidai ni / 0:42; 39 / Luffy vs Crocodile, Futatabi / 2:21; 40 / Omoi vs Yokubou / 2:41; 41 / Chikara o Awasete, Tobiagare! / 1:48; 42 / Hassha Soshi Naru ka!? / 0:48; 43 / Houdan ga Jigenshiki! / 1:07; 44 / Ore wa Kaizokuou ni Naru Otoko da!! / 0:28; 45 / Kuni o Mamoru / 1:02; 46 / Shugoshin Falcon / 0:29; 47 / Ore wa Omae o Koete Iku!!! / 3:02; 48 / Alabasta ni Furu Ame / 0:59; 49 / Kono Sensou no Ue ni Ikiyo / 0:56; 50 / Yomigaetta Heiwa / 1:50; 51 / Vivi no Kokoro Yureru / 1:23; 52 / Robin no Kokoro Kimaru / 2:06; 53 / Vivi no Speech / 1:33; 54 / Nakama no Shirushi da!!! / 2:48; 55 / Compass Movie Version (Instrumental) / 2:48; Disc length / / 74:10	55	74:10	Feb 21, 2007	Movie 8	
20	2007	ONE PIECE 10TH ANNIVERSARY ~SUPER BEST: # / Title / Length / Notes; Disc 1 / / / [DISC 1] Track 01: 1st Opening Theme Performed by Hiroshi Kitadani Lyrics by Shoko Fujibayashi Composed by Kohei Tanaka Arranged by Takayuki Negishi Track 02: 2nd Opening Theme Performed by Folder5 Lyrics by Chiroru Yaho Composed & Arranged by GROOVE SURFERS Track 03: 3rd Opening Theme Performed & Arranged by The babystars Lyrics & Composed by Akihito Tanaka Track 04: 4th Opening Theme Performed by BON-BON BLANCO Lyrics by PANINARO 30 Composed & Arranged by Kohsuke Oshima Track 05: 5th Opening Theme Performed by BOYSTYLE Lyrics by MIZUE Composed by Kazunori Watanabe Arranged by Ryo Yonemitsu Track 06: 6th Opening Theme Performed by D-51 Lyrics by Yasuhide Yoshida Composed by Yasuhide Yoshida, IKUMA Arranged by IKUMA, YOICHI WATANABE Track 07: 7th Opening Theme Performed by Shichinin no Mugiwara Kaizokudan Lyrics by Shoko Fujibayashi Composed by Kohei Tanaka Arranged by Takayuki Negishi Track 08: 1st Ending Theme Performed & Lyrics by Maki Otsuki Composed & Arranged by Junta Mori Track 09: 2nd Ending Theme Performed & Lyrics by Maki Otsuki Composed & Arranged by Junta Mori Track 10: 3rd Ending Theme Performed by TOMATO CUBE Lyrics by Chisato Nishimura Composed by Matto Yamamoto Arranged by TOMATO CUBE, Kaoru Yamauchi Track 11: 4th Ending Theme Performed by Suitei Shoujo Lyrics by Yasushi Akimoto Composed & Arranged by Hajime Hyakkoku Track 12: 5th Ending Theme Performed by AI-SACHI Lyrics by Mikako Sato Composed & Arranged by Nobuhiko Sato Track 13: 6th Ending Theme Performed by The Kaleidoscope Lyrics & Composed by Takumi Ishida Arranged by The Kaleidoscope, Yu Imai Track 14: 7th Ending Theme Performed by Takako Uehara Lyrics by Natsumi Watanabe Composed by Kazuhito Kikuchi Arranged by Ken Harada [DISC 2] Track 01: 8th Ending Theme Performed by Janne Da Arc Lyrics & Composed by yasu Arranged by Janne Da Arc, Hajime Okano Track 02: 10th Ending Theme Performed by Ruppina Lyrics by Mai Kudo Composed by Fumio Yasuda Arranged by Naoto Suzuki Track 03: 11th Ending Theme Performed by Ruppina Lyrics by Mai Kudo Composed by Fumio Yasuda Arranged by Naoto Suzuki Track 04: 12th Ending Theme Performed, Composed & Arranged by ZZ Lyrics by SOTARO Track 05: 13th Ending Theme Performed by shela Lyrics & Composed by Jun Takigawa [瀧川潤] Arranged by Masaki Iehara Track 06: 14th Ending Theme Performed & Lyrics by Aiko☆Ikuta Composed by ACKO Arranged by TEXSUS TAXIS Track 07: 15th Ending Theme Performed by Tackey & Tsubasa Lyrics by Kosuke Morimoto, Mikiko Tagata Composed by Kosuke Morimoto Arranged by CHOKKAKU Track 08: 16th Ending Theme Performed & Lyrics by ASIA ENGINEER Composed by U.S.B 2.0 Arranged by YANAGIMAN Track 09: 17th Ending Theme Performed & Arranged by TRIPLANE Lyrics & Composed by Hyoue Ebata Track 10: 18th Ending Theme Performed by Tohoshinki Lyrics by Takeshi Senoo, Mai Osanai Composed by Takeshi Senoo Arranged by k-muto Track 11: 19th Ending Theme Performed by Delicatessen Lyrics by Hyoutan, BA-K, Sir-Yang, Marky Composed by Hyoutan, Naohisa Taniguchi Arranged by Naohisa Taniguchi Track 12: 9th Ending Theme Performed by Shichinin no Mugiwara Kaizokudan Lyrics by Shoko Fujibayashi Composed by Kohei Tanaka Arranged by Yoshio Tsuru Track 13: Image Song Performed by Ikue Ohtani Lyrics by Shoko Fujibayashi Composed by Kohei Tanaka Arranged by Akifumi Tada Track 14: Image Song Performed by Sogeking to Mugiwara Shounen Shoujo Gasshoudan [そげキングと麦わら少年少女合唱団] Lyrics by Eiichiro Oda Composed & Arranged by Naofumi Jimbo [神保直史] Shichinin no Mugiwara Kaizokudan is a seiyuu collaboration composed of: Mayumi Tanaka; Kazuya Nakai; Akemi Okamura; Kappei Yamaguchi; Hiroaki Hirata; Ikue Ohtani; Yuriko Yamaguchi; 01 / We Are! / 4:03; 02 / Believe / 3:05; 03 / Hikari e / 3:44; 04 / BON VOYAGE! / 4:32; 05 / Kokoro no Chizu / 4:24; 06 / BRAND NEW WORLD / 4:19; 07 / We Are! ~7-nin no Mugiwara Kaizokudanhen~ / 4:17; 08 / memories / 4:27; 09 / RUN! RUN! RUN! / 4:00; 10 / Watashi ga Iru yo / 3:59; 11 / Shouchi no Suke / 3:55; 12 / BEFORE DAWN / 3:19; 13 / fish / 4:26; 14 / GLORY -Kimi ga Iru kara- / 4:58; Disc length / / 57:28; Disc 2: 01 / Shining ray / 4:03; 02 / Free Will / 4:47; 03 / FAITH / 4:23; 04 / A to Z ~ONE PIECE Edition~ / 3:41; 05 / Tsuki to Taiyou / 5:12; 06 / DREAMSHIP / 4:43; 07 / Mirai Koukai / 4:03; 08 / Eternal Pose / 5:05; 09 / Dear friends / 4:33; 10 / Ashita wa Kuru kara / 5:13; 11 / ADVENTURE WORLD / 2:41; 12 / Family ~7-nin no Mugiwara Kaizokudanhen~ / 3:57; 13 / (BONUS TRACK: Character Song) Chopperman no Uta / 2:53; 14 / (BONUS TRACK: Character Song) Sogeking (Hero) no Uta / 1:03; Disc length / / 56:17; Disc 3: 01 / Non-Telop OP&ED Eizou (26-Kyoku); 02 / Sogeking PV; 03 / One Piece DVD Series Shoukai	Disc 1 - 14 Disc 2 - 14 Disc 3 - 3	57:28, 56:17	Mar 07, 2007	Theme songs	
21	2008	ONE PIECE Movie 9 "Episode of Chopper Plus: Bloom in Winter, Miracle Cherry Blossom" Soundtrack & Chopper Character Song Collection: # / Title / Length / Notes; Disc 1 / / / Disc 1 Composed and arranged by Kohei Tanaka (01~03,11,14~28,39~41) Shiro Hamaguchi (04~10,12,13,29~38) Disc 2 02 Composed by: Kohei Tanaka Arranged by: Minoru Maruo Vocal by: Ikue Ohtani Lyrics by: Shoko Fujibayashi 03 Composed by: Kohei Tanaka Arranged by: Hayato Matsuo Vocal by: Ikue Ohtani Lyrics by: Shoko Fujibayashi 05 Composed by: Yasumasa Sato Arranged by: Yasumasa Sato Vocal by: Ikue Ohtani, Mayumi Tanaka Lyrics by: Shoko Fujibayashi 06 Composed by: Kohei Tanaka Arranged by: Minoru Maruo Vocal by: Kappei Yamaguchi & Ikue Ohtani Lyrics by: Shoko Fujibayashi 08 Composed by: Kohei Tanaka Arranged by: Mika Watanabe & Kanichiro Kubo Vocal by: Ikue Ohtani Lyrics by: Shoko Fujibayashi 10 Composed by: Kohei Tanaka Arranged by: Akifumi Tada Vocal by: Ikue Ohtani Lyrics by: Shoko Fujibayashi 12 Composed by: Kohei Tanaka Arranged by: Akifumi Tada Vocal by: Ikue Ohtani Lyrics by: Shoko Fujibayashi 13 Composed by: Kohei Tanaka Arranged by: Minoru Maruo Vocal by: Ikue Ohtani Lyrics by: Shoko Fujibayashi Remixed by Spasm?SPASM? (Upsurge) 14 Composed by: Kohei Tanaka Arranged by: Minoru Maruo Vocal by: Kappei Yamaguchi & Ikue Ohtani Lyrics by: Shoko Fujibayashi Remixed by DJ ZET (Upsurge); 01 / The Fierce Attack of the Blackbeard Pirates / 1:45; 02 / Voyage of The Thousand Sunny / 3:03; 03 / Winter Island - Drum Island / 1:26; 04 / Encounter with Chopper / 1:52; 05 / A Witch?! Dr. Kureha / 1:30; 06 / The Worst King, Wapol / 1:38; 07 / Surfacing! The Bliking / 0:39; 08 / Group of Lapans / 1:36; 09 / Rampage! Zoro & Franky / 1:46; 10 / A Large Avalanche / 3:10; 11 / The Steep Mountain / 0:59; 12 / The Wapol Brother's Scheme / 1:00; 13 / The Isshi-20's Secret Information / 2:44; 14 / Climb Up / 1:08; 15 / The Castle Inhabited by Doctors / 1:40; 16 / Meat!!! / 2:06; 17 / Loneliness of the Blue Nosed One / 1:48; 18 / Quack Doctor - Dr. Hiluluk / 1:08; 19 / The Cry of the Naked One / 1:13; 20 / Warmth / 0:28; 21 / The Miracle Caused by Cherry Blossoms / 1:19; 22 / Hiluluk and Chopper / 0:57; 23 / One Day, Departure Over the Sea / 0:50; 24 / Parting from Hiluluk / 0:47; 25 / Everyone's Battle / 4:11; 26 / Mushroom / 0:47; 27 / Purity / 2:14; 28 / Oh, It was a Good Life!!!! / 4:44; 29 / Wapol Returned / 3:01; 30 / Elder Brother Musshuru's Ability / 2:28; 31 / The Jolly Roger is a Symbol of Belief / 0:56; 32 / Musshuru vs Luffy - Draw / 0:27; 33 / Musshuru vs Luffy - Defeat / 1:19; 34 / Musshuru vs Chopper / 0:26; 35 / Companion / 1:02; 36 / Musshuru vs Luffy - Final / 1:40; 37 / Rumble Ball!! / 1:49; 38 / A Man's Jolly Roger in Hand / 1:00; 39 / Shut Up! Let's Go! / 0:40; 40 / Parting from Kureha / 0:48; 41 / Bloom in Winter, Miracle Cherry Blossoms / 3:32; Disc length / / 67:36; Disc 2: 01 / Chopper Talk 1 / 0:42; 02 / Present / 2:53; 03 / Embrace (Chopper Talk Version) / 4:17; 04 / Chopper Talk 2 / 0:37; 05 / Dr. Tony Tony Chopper / 3:33; 06 / Friends / 3:43; 07 / Chopper Talk 3 / 0:50; 08 / Rumble Ball Chopper Seven Step Transformation / 2:46; 09 / Chopper Talk 4 / 0:51; 10 / Twinkle Twinkle / 5:00; 11 / Chopperman Talk! / 0:18; 12 / Chopperman's Song / 2:58; 13 / Present (Remix Version) / 4:59; 14 / Friends (Remix Version) / 5:18; Disc length / / 38:45	Disc 1 - 41 Disc 2 - 14	67:36 38:45	Feb 27, 2008	Movie 9	
22	2009	One Piece: Binks's Booze: # / Title / Notes; 01 / ビンクスの酒 / 01, 04 Composed by: Kouhei Tanaka Arranged by: Shiro Hamaguchi Vocal by: Mugiwara no Ichimi (Ikue Ohtani, Akemi Okamura, Mayumi Tanaka, Cho, Kazuya Nakai, Hiroaki Hirata, Kazuki Yao, Kappei Yamaguchi, Yuriko Yamaguchi) Lyrics by: Eiichiro Oda 02, 05 Composed by: Kouhei Tanaka Arranged by: Kouhei Tanaka Vocal by: Brook (CV: Cho) Lyrics by: Eiichiro Oda 03, 06 Composed by: Kouhei Tanaka Arranged by: Akifumi Tada Vocal by: Mugiwara no Ichimi (Ikue Ohtani, Akemi Okamura, Mayumi Tanaka, Cho, Kazuya Nakai, Hiroaki Hirata, Kazuki Yao, Kappei Yamaguchi, Yuriko Yamaguchi) Lyrics by: Shoko Fujibayashi; 02 / 幸せの黒いハンカチ; 03 / A THOUSAND DREAMERS ～9人の麦わら海賊団篇～; 04 / ビンクスの酒(カラオケ); 05 / 幸せの黒いハンカチ(カラオケ); 06 / A THOUSAND DREAMERS ～9人の麦わら海賊団篇～(カラオケ)	6		Mar 25, 2009	Songs	
23	2009	ONE PIECE Brook Special CD Brook to Mugiwara no Ichimi no Ongakukai: # / Title / Length / Notes; 01 / Franky's Theme - A / 1:54 / M01~11 Composer info (from JASRAC): Kohei Tanaka (4,6~11) Shiro Hamaguchi (1~3,5) M12 Lyrics: Eiichiro Oda Music: Kohei Tanaka Arrange: Shiro Hamaguchi Vocal: Cho M13 Lyrics: Shoko Fujibayashi Music: Kohei Tanaka Arrange: Takayuki Negishi Perform: Mugiwara no Ichimi Musician Strings: Hiroyuki Koike Strings Piano: 松岡真人 Violin: Masatsugu Shinozaki Brass: Shiro Sasaki Group Perc: Wakako Masuda, Akifumi Tada Recording Studio: Boomerang Studio, Studio A-tone Recording Engineer: Toshiyuki Yoshida, Juji Nakamura, Hiroshi Osako Mastering Engineer: Rena Koyanagi (Form the master) Mastering Studio: Form the master; 02 / Franky's Theme - B / 1:53; 03 / Franky's Theme - C / 1:51; 04 / Brook's Theme / 1:44; 05 / Straw Hat's Daily Life / 1:33; 06 / Adventure On Ghost Island / 2:13; 07 / Brook's Fight - A / 2:23; 08 / Brook's Fight - B / 2:20; 09 / The Straw Hat's Fight / 1:34; 10 / Brook's Eyecatch / 0:10; 11 / Bink's Sake - RUMBA Pirate Version / 0:50; 12 / Bink's Sake - Brook's Version / 3:20; 13 / WE ARE - 9 Straw Hat Pirate Version / 4:15; Disc length / / 26:00	13	26:00	Apr 01, 2009	Compilation	
24	2009	ONE PIECE FILM STRONG WORLD ORIGINAL SOUNDTRACK: # / Title / Length / Notes; 01 / Gold Lion Shiki ~Warning from a Legend~ / 1:58 / Composed & Arranged by Kouhei Tanaka (01,04,06,07,10,12,13,14,15,16,18,21,23,24,28,30) Shiro Hamaguchi (02,03,05,08,09,11,17,19,20,22,25,26,27,29,31,32,33) Yasuharu Konishi (34) Strings: Masatsugu Shinozaki Strings Trumpet: Yuko Kumashiro Group Trombone: Eijiro Nakagawa Group Horn: Yuto Ikeda Group/池田勇太グループ Flute: Takashi Asahi, Mitsuru Soma Clarinet: Masashi Togame Oboe: Satoshi Shoji Percussion: Midori Takada, Tamao Fujii Piano: Ichiro Nagata Tuba: Shinpei Tsugita Harp: Yo Saito Synth Operator: Shiro Hamaguchi, Minoru Maruo Conductor: Kohei Tanaka Musician Coordinator: Toshiaki Ota/太田敏明 (Velvet Line) Recording Engineer: Juji Nakamura Recording Studio: Victor Studio Trackdown Studio: APPO SOUND PROJECT Mastering Engineer: Rena Koyanagi Mastering Studio: form THE MASTER; 02 / Run Luffy! ~Bizarre Island Wildlife~ / 4:38; 03 / Robin, Franky, and Brook ~Shoot the Army Ants!~ / 2:59; 04 / Dance Baby ~A Courting Dance~ / 0:54; 05 / The Ominous Flying Ship ~A Cyclone is Coming~ / 2:55; 06 / Float Float Fruit 1 ~I Wanna Fly Too~ / 0:19; 07 / To East Blue ~Nami Kidnapped~ / 3:31; 08 / Merveille's Secret ~Manipulating Evolution~ / 1:35; 09 / Sanji and Usopp ~Loud Shouts in Vain~ / 2:34; 10 / Daft Green ~Cause of Tragedy~ / 2:08; 11 / Gathering ~Last Desperate Hope~ / 0:58; 12 / Nami Escapes ~The Water-Gathering Pool~ / 0:50; 13 / Blitz Billy Likes Nami ~Surprising Strength~ / 1:52; 14 / Guard Telesnails ~The Eternal Pose Guides the Pirates~ / 0:58; 15 / A Grand Objective ~Good News and a Bad Feeling~ / 3:11; 16 / Reunion with Shiki ~That's the Guy You Gotta Beat!~ / 1:01; 17 / Preemptive Strike ~Pump Up Their Hearts' Volume~ / 1:43; 18 / Float Float Fruit 2 ~Oh No!~ / 0:12; 19 / Despair ~For the Sake of Her Homeland~ / 4:46; 20 / Anguish ~Sorrowful Determination~ / 0:31; 21 / The Operation Begins ~The Village is Destroyed~ / 3:23; 22 / Nami's Message ~Luffy's Anger~ / 2:05; 23 / Broken Nami ~The Pirates' Promise~ / 2:37; 24 / Counterattack Signal ~The Appearance of the Straw Hat Pirates~ / 2:37; 25 / Outnumbered ~The Battle is On~ / 3:11; 26 / Terror of the Giant Animals ~Things Were Already Bad!~ / 1:34; 27 / Shiki Abandons Nami ~Luffy Appears~ / 0:53; 28 / Zoro's Nine Blades ~I Don't Have Time for Your Acrobatics~ / 1:58; 29 / Sanji's Leg of Wind ~This is a Taste of East Blue Love~ / 1:48; 30 / Brewing Storm ~Luffy Cornered~ / 2:09; 31 / The Final Battle ~Gigant Thor Axe~ / 1:45; 32 / Song of Triumph ~The Islands Fall to the Sea, the People Fly to the Sky~ / 3:36; 33 / A Familiar Scene ~Message of Faith~ / 2:43; 34 / ONE PIECE FILM MUSIC / 2:30; Disc length / / 72:22	34	72:22	Dec 09, 2009	Movie 10	
25	2010	ONE PIECE MEMORIAL BEST / Limited Edition: # / Title / Length / Notes; Disc 1 / / / [Disc 1] M-01 - TV Opening 1, Movie 1 Opening Performed by Hiroshi Kitadani Lyrics by Shoko Fujibayashi Composed by Kohei Tanaka Arranged by Takayuki Negishi M-02 - TV Opening 2, "Movie 2: Nejimaki-jima no Bouken" Theme Song, "TV Special Episode 2: Oounabara ni Hirake! Dekkai Dekkai Chichi no Yume!" Opening Performed by Folder5 Lyrics by Chiroru Yaho Composed/arranged by GROOVE SURFERS M-03 - TV Opening 3, "TV Special Episode 3: Mamore! Saigo no Oobutai" Opening Performed/arranged by The babystars Lyrics/composed by Akihito Tanaka M-04 - TV Opening 4, "TV Special Episode 4: Nenmatsu Tokubetsu Kikaku! Mugiwara no Luffy Oyabun Torimonochou" Opening Performed by BON-BON BLANCO Lyrics by PANINARO 30 Composed/arranged by KOHSUKE OSHIMA M-05 - TV Opening 5, "TV Special Espisode 5: Episode of Nami, Koukaishi no Namida to Nakama no Kizuna" Opening Performed by BOYSTYLE Lyrics by MIZUE Composed by Kazunori Watanabe Arranged by Ryo Yonemitsu M-06 - TV Opening 6 Performed by D-51 Lyrics by Yasuhide Yoshida Composed by Yasuhide Yoshida, IKUMA Arranged by IKUMA, YOICHI WATANABE M-07 - TV Opening 7, "TV Special Episode 3: Mamore! Saigo no Oobutai" Ending Performed by 7-nin no Mugiwara Kaizokudan (Mayumi Tanaka, Kazuya Nakai, Akemi Okamura, Kappei Yamaguchi, Hiroaki Hirata, Ikue Ohtani, Yuriko Yamaguchi) Lyrics by Shoko Fujibayashi Composed by Kohei Tanaka Arranged by Takayuki Negishi M-08 - TV Opening 8 Performed by Tackey & Tsubasa Lyrics by TAKESHI Lyrics by Kosuke Morimoto Composed by Kosuke Morimoto Arranged by CHOKKAKU M-09 - TV Opening 9 Performed/Lyrics/composed by 5050 Arranged by 5050, K-MUTO M-10 - TV Opening 10 Performed by Tohoshinki Lyrics by Shoko Fujibayashi Composed by Kohei Tanaka Arranged by AKIRA M-11 - TV Opening 11 Performed by Tohoshinki Lyrics by H.U.B. Composed by Kenichi Maeyamada Arranged by AKIRA M-12 - TV Opening 12 Performed by Mari Yaguchi & Straw-Hat Lyrics by Caxias Shimada Composed by Kei Takahara Arranged by Bungo Saito [斎藤文護], Akiko Iwamuro M-13 - TV Ending 1, Movie 1 Ending, "TV Special Episode 4: Nenmatsu Tokubetsu Kikaku! Mugiwara no Luffy Oyabun Torimonochou" Ending Performed/lyrics by Maki Otsuki Composed/arranged by Junta Mori M-14 -TV Ending 2, "TV Special Episode 1: Luffy Rakka! Hikyou, Umi no Heso no Dai Bouken" Ending Performed by Maki Otsuki Lyrics by Maki Otsuki Composed/arranged by Junta Mori M-15 - TV Ending 3 Performed by TOMATO CUBE Lyrics by Chisato Nishimura Composed by Matto Yamamoto Arranged by TOMATO CUBE, Kaoru Yamauchi M-16 - TV Ending 4 Performed by Suitei Shoujo Lyrics by Yasushi Akimoto Composed/arranged by Hajime Hyakkoku [Disc 2] M-01 - TV Ending 5 Performed by AI-SACHI Lyrics by Mikako Sato Composed/arranged by Nobuhiko Sato M-02 - TV Ending 6 Performed by The Kaleidoscope Lyrics by Takumi Ishida Composed by Takumi Ishida Arranged by The Kaleidoscope, Yu Imai M-03 - TV Ending 7 Performed by Takako Uehara Lyrics by Natsumi Watanabe Composed by Kazuhito Kikuchi Arranged by Ken Harada M-04 - TV Ending 8 Performed/arranged by Janne Da Arc Lyrics/composed by yasu Arranged by Hajime Okano M-05 - TV Ending 9 Performed by Ruppina Lyrics by Mai Kudo Composed by Fumio Yasuda Arranged by Naoto Suzuki M-06 - TV Ending 10 Performed by Ruppina Lyrics by Mai Kudo Composed by Fumio Yasuda Arranged by Naoto Suzuki M-07 - TV Ending 11 Performed/composed/arranged by ZZ Lyrics by SOTARO M-08 - TV Ending 12 Performed by shela Lyrics by Jun Takigawa [瀧川潤] Composed by Jun Takigawa Arranged by Masaki Iehara M-09 - TV Ending 13 Performed/lyrics by Aiko Ikuta Composed by ACKO Arranged by TEXAS TAXIS M-10 - TV Ending 14 Performed by Tackey & Tsubasa Lyrics by Kosuke Morimoto, Mikiko Tagata Composed by Kosuke Morimoto Arranged by CHOKKAKU M-11 - TV Ending 15 Performed/lyrics by ASIA ENGINEER Composed by U.S.B 2.0 Arranged by YANAGIMAN M-12 - TV Ending 16 Performed by TRIPLANE Lyrics/composed by Hyoue Ebata Arranged by Kunio Tago, TRIPLANE M-13 - TV Ending 17 Performed by Touhoushinki Lyrics by Takeshi Senoo, Mai Osanai Composed by Takeshi Senoo Arranged by K-MUTO M-14 - TV Ending 18 Performed by Delicatessen Lyrics by Hyoutan, BA-K, Sir-Yang, Marky Composed by Hyoutan, Naohisa Taniguchi a.k.a. Tony Gucci Arranged by Naohisa Taniguchi a.k.a. Tony Gucci M-15 - Game "One Piece Ocean's Dream" Theme Song, "TV Special Episode 2: Oounabara ni Hirake! Dekkai Dekkai Chichi no Yume!" Ending Performed by 7-nin no Mugiwara Kaizokudan (Mayumi Tanaka, Kazuya Nakai, Akemi Okamura, Kappei Yamaguchi, Hiroaki Hirata, Ikue Ohtani, Yuriko Yamaguchi) Lyrics by Shoko Fujibayashi Composed by Kohei Tanaka Arranged by Yoshio Tsuru M-16 Performed by Mugiwara no Ichimi (Mayumi Tanaka, Kazuya Nakai, Akemi Okamura, Kappei Yamaguchi, Hiroaki Hirata, Ikue Ohtani, Yuriko Yamaguchi, Kazuki Yao, Cho) Lyrics by Eiichiro Oda Composed by Kohei Tanaka Arranged by Shiro Hamaguchi M-17 Performed by 9-nin no Mugiwara Kaizokudan (Mayumi Tanaka, Kazuya Nakai, Akemi Okamura, Kappei Yamaguchi, Hiroaki Hirata, Ikue Ohtani, Yuriko Yamaguchi, Kazuki Yao, Cho) Lyrics by Shoko Fujibayashi Composed by Kohei Tanaka Arranged by Akifumi Tada; 01 / We Are! / 4:01; 02 / Believe / 3:48; 03 / Toward the Light / 3:45; 04 / BON VOYAGE! / 4:30; 05 / Map of the Heart / 4:25; 06 / BRAND NEW WORLD / 4:20; 07 / We Are! -7 Member Straw Hat Pirates version- / 4:17; 08 / Crazy Rainbow / 3:44; 09 / Jungle P / 3:17; 10 / We Are! -One Piece Animation- / 3:37; 11 / Share The World / 3:28; 12 / Search the Wind / 4:08; 13 / memories / 4:26; 14 / RUN! RUN! RUN! / 4:00; 15 / Here I'm! / 3:58; 16 / That's a Fact! / 3:53; Disc length / / 63:37; Disc 2: 01 / BEFORE DAWN / 3:20; 02 / fish / 4:25; 03 / GLORY -Because I Have You- / 4:58; 04 / Shining ray / 4:00; 05 / Free Will / 4:45; 06 / FAITH / 4:19; 07 / A to Z -ONE PIECE Edition- / 3:36; 08 / The Moon and The Sun / 5:11; 09 / DREAMSHIP / 4:44; 10 / Future Voyage / 4:04; 11 / Eternal Pose / 5:05; 12 / Dear friends / 4:32; 13 / Tomorrow Will Come / 5:13; 14 / ADVENTURE WORLD / 2:42; 15 / Family -7 Member Straw Hat Pirates- / 3:55; 16 / Bink's Sake(BONUS TRACK) / 3:20; 17 / A THOUSAND DREAMERS -9 Member Straw Hat Pirates- (BONUS TRACK) / 4:04; Disc length / / 72:13; Disc 3: 01 / Chapter 4, 'Luffy meets red-haired Shanks'; 02 / Non-credit OP & ED (all 31 songs); 03 / Impel Down-hen	Disc 1 - 16 Disc 2 - 17 Disc 3 - 3	63:37 72:13	Mar 17, 2010	Compilation	
26	2011	ONE PIECE NEW WORLD BGM: # / Title / Length; 01 / 新世界編BGM・次回予告 / 0:30; 02 / 新世界編BGM・アイキャッチ / 0:06; 03 / 新世界編BGM・ウィーゴー!ストリングスver..「動」 / 2:15; 04 / 新世界編BGM・ウィーゴー!ストリングスver..「静」 / 1:50; 05 / 新世界編BGM・ウィーゴー!ストリングスver..「穏」 / 1:27; Disc length / / 6:08	5	6:08	Nov 23, 2011	Theme songs	
27	2012	ONE PIECE: KAIZOKU MUSOU ORIGINAL SOUNDTRACK: # / Title / Length / Notes; 01 / The King of Pirates メインテーマ / 1:30 / Comes with the Treasure Box version of the game "One Piece: Kaizoku Musou" for PS3. Composition MASA: 01, 04~06, 08, 10 Shin-ichiro Nakamura: 02, 03, 09 Hiroaki Takahashi: 07 Horn section arrange: Hitoshi Ishitoya Performance 1st Trumpet: Luis Valle 2nd Trumpet: Teppei Kawakami Trombone: Hitoshi Ishitoya Alto sax: Masato Honma Tenor sax: Satoru Takeshima Baritone sax: Naoya Takemura Baritone sax: Kazuhiro Murase =Staff= Mixing Recording Engineer: Hirotaka Miyahara (宮原 弘貴) Assistant engineer: Sousuke Tsujinaka Music Coordinator: Yoshifumi Ando (安東 義史), Tamami Aoki (青木 珠美) Recording studio: MIT STUDIO; 02 / Beginning of Voyage メニュー画面 / 2:54; 03 / Story Telling ナレーション / 1:28; 04 / My Pleasant Friends シャボンディ諸島 / 4:12; 05 / Prepare for Pirates オレンジの町 / 3:27; 06 / Theme of Buggy バギーのテーマ / 3:51; 07 / I'm Gonna Take It 海上レスロラン．バラティエ / 4:36; 08 / The Challengers ボス戦1．通常ボス / 2:34; 09 / The End of a Battle 戦後評価 / 1:45; 10 / I'm Hungry! プレイヤー勝利 / 0:12; Disc length / / 26:29	10	26:29	Mar 01, 2012	Video Game OST	
28	2012	ONE PIECE FILM Z ORIGINAL SOUNDTRACK	30	1:10:23	Dec 12, 2012	Movie OST	
29	2013	ONE PIECE 15th Anniversary Best Album	Disc 1 - 15 Disc 2 - 12 Disc 3 - 11	2:35:08	Jan 16, 2013	Compilation	
30	2013	ONE PIECE: PIRATE WARRIORS 2 ORIGINAL SOUNDTRACK	13	32:49	Mar 20, 2013	Video Game OST	
31	2013	ONE PIECE BGM BEST SELECTION	44	1:12:38	Jul 26, 2013		
32	2013	ONE PIECE BGM COLLECTION - NEW WORLD	15	28:47	Aug 14, 2013		
33	2014	Wake up! - AAA / Limited Edition	Disc 1 - 4 Disc 2 - 2	26:03	Jul 02, 2014		
34	2015	ONE PIECE NIPPON JUUDAN! 47 CRUISE CD	Albums - 47 Tracks - 94		Jan 28, 2015		
35	2015	Liberator/Afureru Mono / Goodbye holiday [ONE PIECE Edition]	2	7:42	Oct 28, 2015		
36	2016	ONE PIECE NIPPON JUUDAN! 47 CRUISE CD - Collection	Albums - 4 Tracks - 52		Feb 24, 2016		
37	2016	ONE PIECE Arrange Collection CLASSIC	10		Mar 30, 2016		
38	2016	ONE PIECE Arrange Collection ROCK	10		Mar 30, 2016		
39	2016	ONE PIECE Arrange Collection EUROBEAT	10		Mar 30, 2016		
40	2016	ONE PIECE Arrange Collection EDM	10		Mar 30, 2016		
41	2016	ONE PIECE Original Soundtrack "New World"	Disc 1 - 33 Disc 2 - 33	2:06:30	Jul 20, 2016	Anime OST	
42	2016	One Piece Character Song Best "Festival"	Disc 1 - 17 Disc 2 - 19 Disc 3 - 15	3:08:32	Jul 20, 2016		
43	2016	ONE PIECE FILM GOLD Original Soundtrack	Disc 1 - 23 Disc 2 - 36	1:43:48	Jul 27, 2016	Movie OST	
44	2017	ONE PIECE: Big Mom's Music Concert	Disc 1 - 10 Disc 2 - 2	31:11	Jul 19, 2017	Anime OST	
45	2018	ONE PIECE WE ARE! Song Complete	14		Feb 28, 2018		
46	2018	ONE PIECE Island Song Collection	Disc 1 - 14 Disc 2 - 13		Aug 24, 2018	Compilation	
47	2019	ONE PIECE CharacterSong AL	Albums - 9		Jan 25, 2019		
48	2019	ONE PIECE MUSIC MATERIAL / Limited Edition	Disc - 5	6:07:03	Feb 22, 2019		
49	2019	ONE PIECE WORLD SEEKER ORIGINAL SOUNDTRACK	Disc 1 - 22 Disc 2 - 34	1:41:23	Mar 15, 2019	Video Game OST	
50	2019	ONE PIECE 20th Anniversary BEST ALBUM / Limited Edition	Disc 1 - 13 Disc 2 - 15 Disc 3 - 10	2:35:09	Mar 27, 2019	Compilation	
51	2019	OVER THE TOP	4	18:09	September 25, 2019	Anime opening	
52	2019	ONE PIECE STAMPEDE ORIGINAL SOUNDTRACK	Disc 1 - 27 Disc 2 - 13	1:11:12	October 30, 2019	Movie OST	
53	2020	ONE PIECE MUUUSIC COVER ALBUM	11	46:36	May 27, 2020		
54	2022	One Piece OST - WANOKUNI	Disc 1 - 30 Disc 2 - 29	2:13:55	March 16, 2022	Anime OST	
55	2022	One Piece: New World - Original Soundtrack	Disc 1 - 31 Disc 2 - 36	41:00	August 5, 2022		
56	2022	Uta no Uta: ONE PIECE FILM RED / Limited Edition	Disc 1 - 8 (+ 2 & Disc 2 - 3 in L.E.)	30:56 (47:16 L.E.)	August 10, 2022	Movie OST	Limited Edition
57	2022	One Piece Movies Best Selection	Disc 1 - 27 Disc 2 - 25	1:11:01	October 7, 2022		
58	2022	ONE PIECE FILM RED ORIGINAL SOUNDTRACK	48	1:05:53	October 28, 2022	Movie OST	
59	2024	One Piece OST - GEAR5	31	1:05:01	January 26, 2024	Anime OST	
60	2025	Spacecraft/Sailing / BE:FIRST ["ONE PIECE" Edition]	Disc 1 - 4 Disc 2 - 2	21:09	February 5, 2025		
61	2025	ONE PIECE COVER SONGS	11		February 28, 2025		
62	2025	ONE PIECE 25th Anniversary BEST 1999–2024	Disc 1 - 11 Disc 2 - 15 Disc 3 - 10 Disc 4 - 16 Disc 5 - 43		April 23, 2025		
63	2025	ONE PIECE FAN LETTER Original Soundtrack	18		July 30, 2025		
64	2025	ONE PIECE Original Soundtrack EGGHEAD	Disc 1 - 43 Disc 2 - 15	1:53:33	December 29, 2025	Anime OST	
65	2026	One Piece OST - ELBAPH part1	29	52:50	October 28, 2026	Anime OST	

== Charts ==
=== Compilation albums ===
All album were released by Avex record label.

Year	Title	Release date	Charts		Ref(s)
Year	Title	Release date	Peak	Weeks	Ref(s)
2002	One Piece: Character Song Album (「One Piece ワンピース」キャラクターソングアルバム)	March 6, 2002	—		
2003	One Piece: Best Album (ワンピース主題歌集, Wan Pīsu: Shudai Kashū)	July 30, 2003	5	17	
2004	One Piece: Character Song Album: Piece 2 (7人の麦わら海賊団ライヴ大海戦！ワンピース キャラクターソングアルバム Piece.2) Shichinin no Mugiwara Kaizokudan Raivu Dai Kaisen!)	February 25, 2004	104	2	
2005	One Piece: Best Album (2nd Piece) (ワンピース主題歌集 2nd Piece, Wan Pīsu: Shudai Kashū (2nd Piece))	March 24, 2005	16	13	
2005	One Piece: Character Song Carnival!! (ワンピース キャラソンカーニバル！！)	February 2, 2005	194	1	
2007	One Piece: Super Best	March 7, 2007	12	20	
2010	One Piece Memorial Best	March 17, 2010	1	1	
2013	One Piece 15th Anniversary Best Album	January 16, 2013	3	1	
2019	One Piece 20th Anniversary Best Album	March 27, 2019	11	3	

=== Theme songs ===
Year	Title	Artist	Charts		Ref(s)
Year	Title	Artist	Peak	Weeks	Ref(s)
1999	"We Are!" (ウィーアー!, Wī Ā!): Released: November 20, 1999; Label: Columbia Music Entertainment; Won the Animation Kobe Theme Song Award of the year 2000; Used as opening theme for episodes 1–47 and 1000 (as special opening theme), the television special, Umi no Heso no Dai Bouken, and the feature film, One Piece: The Movie; A cover version by the 7 Straw Hat Pirates (as "We Are! (7 Straw Hat Pirates Ver.)") is used as opening theme for episodes 279–283. (Opening 7); A cover version by TVXQ (as "We Are! (One Piece Animation 10th Anniversary Ver.)") is used as opening theme for episodes 373–394. (Opening 10); Dubbed into English by Vic Mignogna and Jerry Jewell (Note: The alternative English version of the song is only used in the TV edited broadcast of episode 152.) for the Funimation release. It was initially dubbed by Russell Velazquez for the 4Kids version before the "Pirate Rap" is used.	Hiroshi Kitadani	67	5	
1999	"memories": Released: December 1, 1999; Label: Sony Music Entertainment; Used as ending theme for episodes 1–30 and One Piece: The Movie; Dubbed into English by Brina Palencia for the Funimation release.	Maki Otsuki	94	1	
2000	"RUN! RUN! RUN!": Released: August 9, 2000; Label: Sony Music Entertainment; Used as ending theme for episodes 31–63; Dubbed into English by Caitlin Glass for the Funimation release.	Maki Otsuki	14	10	
2000	"Believe": Released: November 29, 2000; Label: Avex Trax; Used as opening theme for episodes 48–115 and as ending theme for Clockwork Island Adventure; Dubbed into English by Meredith McCoy for the Funimation release.	Folder5	16	14	
2001	"Watashi ga Iru yo" (私がいるよ; lit. 'I Am Right Here'): Released: April 25, 2001; Label: Warner Music Japan; Used as ending theme for episodes 64–73	Tomato Cube	58	3	
2001	"Shōchi no Suke" (しょうちのすけ; lit. 'That Is a Fact'): Released: August 22, 2001; Label: Sony Music Entertainment; Used as ending theme for episodes 74–81; Dubbed into English by Stephanie Young for the Funimation release.	Suitei Shōjo	47	5	
2001	"BEFORE DAWN": Released: November 28, 2001; Label: Avex Trax; Used as ending theme for episodes 82–94; Dubbed into English by Carli Mosier for the Funimation release.	Ai-Sachi	33	7	
2002	"fish": Released: February 6, 2002; Label: Cutting Edge; Used as ending theme for episodes 95–106; Dubbed into English by Leah Clark for the Funimation release.	The Kaleidoscope	92	1	
2002	"Mabushikute" (まぶしくて; lit. 'Dazzling'): Released: February 27, 2002; Label: Avex Trax; Used as ending theme for Chopper's Kingdom on the Island of Strange Animals	Dasein	40	2	
2002	"GLORY -Kimi ga Iru kara-" (GLORY-君がいるから-, Gurōrī -Kimi ga Iru kara-; lit. 'Glory (You Are Here)'): Released: May 22, 2002; Label: Sonic Groove; Used as ending theme for episodes 107–118; Dubbed into English by Caitlin Glass for the Funimation release.	Takako Uehara	15	4	
2002	"Hikari e" (ヒカリヘ; lit. 'Into the Light'): Released: July 24, 2002; Label: Ki/oon Records; Used as opening theme for episodes 116–168; Dubbed into English by Vic Mignogna for the Funimation release.	The Babystars	42	20	
2002	"Shining ray": Released: August 7, 2002; Label: Cutting Edge; Used as ending theme for episodes 119–127, 129–132; Dubbed into English by Justin Houston for the Funimation release.	Janne Da Arc	8	4	
2002	"Free Will/violet flow": Released: December 26, 2002; Label: Avex Trax; "Free Will" is used as ending theme for episodes 133–155; Dubbed into English by Kristine Sa for the Funimation release.	Ruppina	15	4	
2003	"Family ~Shichinin no Mugiwara Kaizokudan Hen~" (Family～7人の麦わら海賊団篇～, Famirī ~Shichinin no Mugiwara Kaizokudan Hen~; subtitle lit. "7 Straw Hat Pirates ver."): Released: February 5, 2003; Label: Avex Trax; Used as ending theme for episode 128 and the television specials Taikai Hara Nihiru Raketto! Dekkai Dekkai Kaito Chichi no Yume!, Mamoru! Saigo no Dai Butai, and Nemmatsu Tokubetsu Kikaku! Mugiwara no Rufi Oyabun Torimonochō	7 Straw Hat Pirates	115	2	
2003	"Lost Man/Sailing Day" (ロストマン/sailing day, Rosuto Man/Seiringu Dei): Released: March 12, 2003; Label: Toy's Factory; "Sailing Day" is used as ending theme for Dead End Adventure	Bump of Chicken	2	2	
2003	"FAITH/Thousand Lights": Released: August 20, 2003; Label: Avex Trax; "FAITH" is used as ending theme for episodes 156–168; Dubbed into English by Caitlin Glass for the Funimation release.	Ruppina	30	4	
2003	"Every-one Peace!": Released: September 18, 2003; Label: Avex Trax	Monkey D. Luffy	51	4	
2003	"Eyes of ZORO": Released: September 18, 2003; Label: Avex Trax	Roronoa Zoro	42	4	
2003	"between the wind": Released: September 18, 2003; Label: Avex Trax	Nami	58	3	
2003	"Moulin Rouge" (ムーランルージュ, Mūran Rūju): Released: September 18, 2003; Label: Avex Trax	Sanji	41	3	
2003	"Jungle Fever ~Kaizoku no Kaizoku ni Yoru Kaizoku no Tame no Kanshasai~" (Jungle fever ～海賊の海賊による海賊のための感謝祭～; subtitle lit. "The Pirates' Pirates Thanksgiving for Pirates"): Released: October 29, 2003; Label: Avex Trax	7 Straw Hat Pirates, etc.	39	3	
2003	"A to Z ~ONE PIECE Edition~": Released: November 12, 2003; Label: Avex Trax; Used as ending theme for episodes 169–181; Dubbed into English by Vic Mignogna for the Funimation release.	ZZ	45	7	
2003	"Usopp no Hanamichi" (ウソップの花道, Usoppu no Hanamichi; lit. 'Usopp's Flower Arrangement'): Released: December 17, 2003; Label: Avex Trax	Usopp	121	2	
2003	"Present" (プレゼント, Purezento): Released: December 17, 2003; Label: Avex Trax	Tony Tony Chopper	96	2	
2003	"my real life": Released: December 17, 2003; Label: Avex Trax	Nico Robin	106	2	
2004	"BON VOYAGE!": Released: January 14, 2004; Label: Columbia Music Entertainment; Used as opening theme for episodes 169–206; Dubbed into English by Brina Palencia for the Funimation release.	Bon-Bon Blanco	8	14	
2004	"Tsuki to Taiyō" (月と太陽; lit. 'Moon and Sun'): Released: March 3, 2004; Label: Avex Trax; Used as ending theme for episodes 182–195; Dubbed into English by Stephanie Young for the Funimation release.	shela	45	4	
2004	"Ano Basho e" (あの場所へ; lit. 'To That Place'): Released: March 10, 2004; Label: Sony Music Entertainment; Used as ending theme for One Piece: The Cursed Holy Sword	Harebare	16	10	
2004	"DREAMSHIP": Released: August 11, 2004; Label: Cutting Edge; Used as ending theme for episodes 196–206; Dubbed into English by Jessi James for the Funimation release.	Aiko Ikuta	83	2	
2004	"Hurricane girls": Released: September 29, 2004; Label: Avex Trax	Nami, Nico Robin	76	3	
2004	"Friends" (フレンズ, Furenzu): Released: September 29, 2004; Label: Avex Trax	Usopp, Tony Tony Chopper	81	2	
2004	"RESPECT!": Released: September 29, 2004; Label: Avex Trax	Monkey D. Luffy, Roronoa Zoro, Sanji	47	3	
2004	"Kokoro no Chizu" (ココロのちず; lit. 'Map of the Heart'): Released: November 17, 2004; Label: Imperial Records; Used as opening theme for episodes 207–263	Boystyle	24	17	
2004	"Twinkle Twinkle/Utae! Christmas ~Jingle Bell~" (Twinkle Twinkle/歌え！クリスマス～ジングルベル～; lit. 'Twinkle Twinkle/Sing! Christmas ~Jingle Bells~'): Released: November 25, 2004; Label: Avex Trax	Tony Tony Chopper/7 Straw Hat Pirates	71	3	
2005	"Yumemiru Goro o Sugitemo" (夢見る頃を過ぎても; lit. 'Even If I Spend Too Much Time Dreaming'): Released: March 2, 2005; Label: EMI Music Japan; Used as ending theme for Baron Omatsuri and the Secret Island	Kishidan	7	10	
2005	"Kamen/Mirai Kōkai" (仮面/未来航海; lit. 'Mask/Future Voyage'): Released: May 4, 2005; Label: Avex Trax; "Mirai Kōkai" is used as ending theme for episodes 207–229	Tackey & Tsubasa	1	8	
2005	"Eternal Pose" (エターナルポーズ, Etānaru Pōzu): Released: July 27, 2005; Label: Rhythm Zone; Used as ending theme for episodes 230–245	Asia Engineer	17	8	
2005	"One Piece Chopper Cellphone Pochette With CD" (ワンピース チョッパー携帯ポシェット付きCD, Wan Pīsu Choppā Keitai Poshetto-tsuki CD) A-Side: "You are the one" B-Side: "Fly Merry Fly ~ Sayonara Merry" (FLY MERRY FLY～さよならメリー, Furai Merī Furai ~ Sayonara Merī): Released: December 21, 2005; Label: Avex Trax	7 Straw Hat Pirates/Usopp	87	1	
2006	"Dear friends": Released: January 11, 2006; Label: Tearbridge Records; Used as ending theme for episodes 246–255	Triplane	39	5	
2006	"Asu wa Kuru kara" (明日は来るから; lit. Because Tomorrow Will Come): Released: March 8, 2006; Label: Rhythm Zone; Used as ending theme for episodes 256–263	TVXQ	22	5	
2006	"Sayaendō/Hadashi no Cinderella Boy" (サヤエンドウ/裸足のシンデレラボーイ, Sayaendō/Hadashi no Shinderera Bōi; lit. 'Peas/Barefoot Cinderella Boy'): Released: March 15, 2006; Label: Johnny's Entertainment; "Sayaendou" is used as ending theme for The Giant Mechanical Soldier of Karakuri Castle	NewS	1	14	
2006	"BRAND NEW WORLD": Released: July 26, 2006; Label: Pony Canyon; Used as opening theme for episodes 264–278	D-51	15	11	
2006	"ADVENTURE WORLD": Released: July 26, 2006; Label: Avex Trax; Used as ending theme for episodes 264–278	"Delicatessen" (デリカテッセン, Derikatessen)	105	2	
2006	"Chopperman no Uta" (チョッパーマンのうた, Choppāman no Uta; lit. 'The Song of Chopperman'): Released: December 13, 2006; Label: Avex Trax	Chopperman, Dr. Usodabada	109	2	
2007	"compass": Released: March 14, 2007; Label: Tsubasa Records; Used as ending theme for One Piece Movie: The Desert Princess and the Pirates: Adventures in Alabasta	Ai Kawashima	17	6	
2007	"Dame/Crazy Rainbow" (×～ダメ～/Crazy Rainbow): Released: April 18, 2007; Label: Avex Trax; "Crazy Rainbow" is used as opening theme for episodes 284–325	Tackey & Tsubasa	1	12	
2007	"Jungle P": Released: November 7, 2007; Label: Avex Trax; Used as opening theme for episodes 326–372	5050	87	2	
2008	"Mata ne" (またね; lit. 'Until Next Time'): Released: February 27, 2008; Label: Universal Music; Used as ending theme for Episode of Chopper Plus: Bloom in the Winter, Miracle Cherry Blossom	Dreams Come True	8	8	
2008	"Thousand Sunny Song CD" (サウザンドサニー号ソングCD, Sauzando Sanī-gō CD) A-Side: "A THOUSAND DREAMERS" B-Side: "Franky! Guarantee!" (フランキー！ギャランティー！, Furankī Gyarantī!): Released: February 27, 2008; Label: Avex Trax	8 Straw Hat Pirates, etc.	125	1	
2009	"Binks no Sake" (ビンクスの酒; lit. 'Bink's Rum'): Released: March 25, 2009; Label: Avex Entertainment	Brook	26	-	
2009	"Share the World/We Are!" (Share The World/ウィーアー!): Released: April 22, 2009; Label: Rhythm Zone; "We Are! ~One Piece Animation 10th Anniversary Ver.~" is used as opening theme for episodes 373–394; "Share The World" is used as opening theme for episodes 394–425	TVXQ	1	45	
2010	"Kaze o Sagashite" (風をさがして; lit. 'Searching for the Wind'): Released: January 13, 2010; Label: Avex Trax; Used as opening theme for episodes 426–459	Yaguchi Mari With Straw Hat	2	11	
2010	"One day": Released: October 20, 2010; Label: Rhythm Zone; Used as opening theme between episodes 460-492	The Rootless	3	32	
2011	Naked/Fight Together/Tempest (Opening 14): Released: July 27, 2011; Label: Avex Trax; "Fight Together" used as opening theme between episodes 493-516	Namie Amuro	2	7	
2011	"We Go!" (ウィーゴー!, Wī Gō!): Released: November 16, 2011; Label: Avex Entertainment; Used as opening theme between episodes 517-591	Hiroshi Kitadani	13	15	
2011	NEW WORLD: Released: December 12, 2011; Label: Avex Entertainment	Brook	19	-	

One Piece television anime themes
Year	Eps.	Opening theme		Ending theme	
Year	Eps.	Title	Artist	Title	Artist
1999	1–30	"We Are!" (ウィーアー!, Wī Ā!)	Hiroshi Kitadani	"memories"	Maki Otsuki
2000	31–47	"We Are!" (ウィーアー!, Wī Ā!)	Hiroshi Kitadani	"RUN! RUN! RUN!"	Maki Otsuki
2000	48–63	"Believe"	Folder5	"RUN! RUN! RUN!"	Maki Otsuki
2001	64-73	"Believe"	Folder5	"Watashi ga Iru yo" (私がいるよ; lit. 'I Am Right Here')	Tomato Cube
2001	74-81	"Believe"	Folder5	"Shōchi no Suke" (しょうちのすけ; lit. 'That Is a Fact')	Suitei Shoujo
2001	82-94	"Believe"	Folder5	"BEFORE DAWN"	Ai-Sachi
2002	95-106	"Believe"	Folder5	"fish"	The Kaleidoscope
2002	107-115	"Believe"	Folder5	"GLORY -Kimi ga Iru kara-" (GLORY-君がいるから-, Gurōrī -Kimi ga Iru kara-; lit. 'Glory (You Are Here)')	Takako Uehara
2002	116-118	"Hikari e" (ヒカリヘ; lit. 'Into the Light')	The Babystars	"GLORY -Kimi ga Iru kara-" (GLORY-君がいるから-, Gurōrī -Kimi ga Iru kara-; lit. 'Glory (You Are Here)')	Takako Uehara
2002	119-127	"Hikari e" (ヒカリヘ; lit. 'Into the Light')	The Babystars	"Shining ray"	Janne Da Arc
2002	128	"Hikari e" (ヒカリヘ; lit. 'Into the Light')	The Babystars	"Family ~Shichinin no Mugiwara Kaizokudan Hen~" (Family～7人の麦わら海賊団篇～, Famirī ~Shichinin no Mugiwara Kaizokudan Hen~; subtitle lit. "7 Straw Hat Pirates ver.")	7 Straw Hat Pirates
2002	129-132	"Hikari e" (ヒカリヘ; lit. 'Into the Light')	The Babystars	"Shining ray"	Janne Da Arc
2002	133-155	"Hikari e" (ヒカリヘ; lit. 'Into the Light')	The Babystars	"Free Will/violet flow"	Ruppina
2003	156-168	"Hikari e" (ヒカリヘ; lit. 'Into the Light')	The Babystars	"FAITH/Thousand Lights"	Ruppina
2003	169-181	"BON VOYAGE!"	Bon-Bon Blanco	"A to Z ~ONE PIECE Edition~"	ZZ
2004	182-195	"BON VOYAGE!"	Bon-Bon Blanco	"Tsuki to Taiyō" (月と太陽; lit. 'Moon and Sun')	shela
2004	196–206	"BON VOYAGE!"	Bon-Bon Blanco	"DREAMSHIP"	Aiko Ikuta
2004	207-229	"Kokoro no Chizu" (ココロのちず; lit. 'Map of the Heart')	Boystyle	"Kamen/Mirai Kōkai" (仮面/未来航海; lit. 'Mask/Future Voyage')	Tackey & Tsubasa
2005	230-245	"Kokoro no Chizu" (ココロのちず; lit. 'Map of the Heart')	Boystyle	"Eternal Pose" (エターナルポーズ, Etānaru Pōzu)	Asia Engineer
2006	246-255	"Kokoro no Chizu" (ココロのちず; lit. 'Map of the Heart')	Boystyle	"Dear friends"	Triplane
2006	256-263	"Kokoro no Chizu" (ココロのちず; lit. 'Map of the Heart')	Boystyle	"Asu wa Kuru kara" (明日は来るから; lit. Because Tomorrow Will Come)	TVXQ
2006	264-278	"BRAND NEW WORLD"	D-51	"ADVENTURE WORLD"	"Delicatessen" (デリカテッセン, Derikatessen)
2006	279-283	"We Are!" (7 Straw Hat Pirates Ver.)	7 Straw Hat Pirates	From ep. 279 to ep. 1070, no ending credits or themes were broadcast; instead, each episode ends with a narrated preview of the next one.	
2007	284-325	"Dame/Crazy Rainbow" (×～ダメ～/Crazy Rainbow)	Tackey & Tsubasa	From ep. 279 to ep. 1070, no ending credits or themes were broadcast; instead, each episode ends with a narrated preview of the next one.	
2008	326-372	"Jungle P"	5050	From ep. 279 to ep. 1070, no ending credits or themes were broadcast; instead, each episode ends with a narrated preview of the next one.	
2009	373-394	"We Are" (One Piece Animation 10th Anniversary Ver.)	TVXQ	From ep. 279 to ep. 1070, no ending credits or themes were broadcast; instead, each episode ends with a narrated preview of the next one.	
2009	395-425	"Share the World"	TVXQ	From ep. 279 to ep. 1070, no ending credits or themes were broadcast; instead, each episode ends with a narrated preview of the next one.	
2009	426-458	"Kaze wo Sagashite" (風をさがして; lit. Search for the Wind)	Mari Yaguchi and Straw Hat	From ep. 279 to ep. 1070, no ending credits or themes were broadcast; instead, each episode ends with a narrated preview of the next one.	
2010	459-492	"One Day"	The ROOTLESS	From ep. 279 to ep. 1070, no ending credits or themes were broadcast; instead, each episode ends with a narrated preview of the next one.	
2011	493-516	"Fight Together"	Namie Amuro	From ep. 279 to ep. 1070, no ending credits or themes were broadcast; instead, each episode ends with a narrated preview of the next one.	
2011	517-589	"We Go!"	Hiroshi Kitadani	From ep. 279 to ep. 1070, no ending credits or themes were broadcast; instead, each episode ends with a narrated preview of the next one.	
2013	591-628	"Hands Up!"	Kota Shinto	From ep. 279 to ep. 1070, no ending credits or themes were broadcast; instead, each episode ends with a narrated preview of the next one.	
2014	629-686	"Wake Up!"	AAA	From ep. 279 to ep. 1070, no ending credits or themes were broadcast; instead, each episode ends with a narrated preview of the next one.	
2015	687-746	"Hard Knock Days"	Generations from Exile Tribe	From ep. 279 to ep. 1070, no ending credits or themes were broadcast; instead, each episode ends with a narrated preview of the next one.	
2016	747-806	"We Can!"	Kishidan and Hiroshi Kitadani	From ep. 279 to ep. 1070, no ending credits or themes were broadcast; instead, each episode ends with a narrated preview of the next one.	
2017	807-855	"Hope"	Namie Amuro	From ep. 279 to ep. 1070, no ending credits or themes were broadcast; instead, each episode ends with a narrated preview of the next one.	
2018	856-891	"Super Powers"	V6	From ep. 279 to ep. 1070, no ending credits or themes were broadcast; instead, each episode ends with a narrated preview of the next one.	
2019	892-934	"OVER THE TOP"	Hiroshi Kitadani and Kohei Tanaka	From ep. 279 to ep. 1070, no ending credits or themes were broadcast; instead, each episode ends with a narrated preview of the next one.	
2020	935-999	"DREAMIN' ON"	Da-iCE	From ep. 279 to ep. 1070, no ending credits or themes were broadcast; instead, each episode ends with a narrated preview of the next one.	
2021	1000	"We Are!" (Special Edition)	Da-iCE	From ep. 279 to ep. 1070, no ending credits or themes were broadcast; instead, each episode ends with a narrated preview of the next one.	
2021	1001–1004	"DREAMIN' ON"	Da-iCE	From ep. 279 to ep. 1070, no ending credits or themes were broadcast; instead, each episode ends with a narrated preview of the next one.	
2022	1005–1070	"PAINT"	I Don't Like Mondays.	From ep. 279 to ep. 1070, no ending credits or themes were broadcast; instead, each episode ends with a narrated preview of the next one.	
2022	1071–1073	"PAINT"	I Don't Like Mondays.	"Raise"	Chilli Beans.
2023	1074–1088	"The Peak" (最高到達点, Saikō Tōtatsuten; Highest Point)	Sekai no Owari	"Raise"	Chilli Beans.
2024	1089–1122	"UUUUUS!" (あーーっす！, Āassu!)	Hiroshi Kitadani	"Dear Sunrise"	Maki Otsuki
2025	1123–1139	"Angel & Devil" (天使と悪魔, Tenshi to Akuma)	GRe4N BOYZ	"The 1"	muque
2025	1139-	"Carmine" (カーマイン, Kamain)	Ellegarden	"Punks"	Chameleon Lime Whoopie Pie

== Reception ==
Carl Kimlinger of Anime News Network states that "One Piece has always stood out for its use of music", which they describe as a "usual mix of trumpeting pirate bombast, rocking action music, and catchy individual themes". Margaret Veira of Active Anime states that the anime television series' "background music sets the mood and the scenes perfectly".

== See also ==
- List of One Piece media
