= One Piece (film) =

2000 film by Junji Shimizu

- Japanese DVD release cover
- Directed by: Junji Shimizu
- Screenplay by: Michiru Shimada
- Based on: One Piece by Eiichiro Oda
- Starring: Mayumi Tanaka; Kazuya Nakai; Akemi Okamura; Kappei Yamaguchi; Ikue Otani; Kenji Utsumi; Takeshi Aono; Yuka Imai
- Cinematography: Toshiharu Takei
- Edited by: Shinichi Fukumitsu; Kōichi Katagiri
- Music by: Kōhei Tanaka
- Production company: Toei Animation
- Distributed by: Toei Company
- Release date: March 4, 2000 (Japan)
- Running time: 51 minutes
- Country: Japan
- Language: Japanese
- Box office: ¥2.16 billion (Japan)

One Piece (also referred to as One Piece: The Movie) is a 2000 anime film directed by Junji Shimizu and produced by Toei Animation. It is the first film from the One Piece anime series, based on the manga series of the same name, and the only film in the series to use cel animation. It was originally released on March 4, 2000, by Toei Company as part of the Spring 2000 Toei Anime Fair, alongside Digimon Adventure: Our War Game!. The events of the film take place during the first season of One Piece as the first story arcs, "East Blue Saga".

== Plot ==
In the East Blue, the pirate Eldoraggo and his crew are searching for the treasure left behind by the legendary Great Gold Pirate Woonan, which is said to be a mountain of gold; Eldoraggo eventually finds a treasure map to Woonan's gold by killing Woonan's former crew. While traveling to the treasure, Eldoraggo's men rob the Straw Hat Pirates, who have run out of food and are close to starving. Luffy attacks them and accidentally smashes their small boat in the process.

Eldoraggo retaliates using his Scream-Scream devil fruit powers, sending a powerful shock-wave that completely destroys the small boat and knocks the Going Merry away. Zoro dives into the sea to save Luffy, separating them from the rest of the Straw Hats, and finds Tobio, a small boy who was forced to work for Eldoraggo. Smelling food, Luffy, Zoro and Tobio use the remains of the boat to travel to a floating oden shop run by Tobio's grandfather, Ganzo.

Not having any cash, Luffy and Zoro accidentally perform an eat and run and are chained together by Ganzo. Eldoraggo and his crew land on Woonan's island, where they encounter Usopp. Usopp convinces Eldoraggo not to kill him by claiming to be a professional treasure hunter, and close friend of Woonan, and begins leading him around the island aimlessly.

Meanwhile, Luffy and Zoro, still chained together, chase after Luffy's hat onto the island when it blows away in the wind; Tobio follows them and the group becomes lost. Nami finds Woonan's crew, and Usopp lies about the location of the gold, telling Eldoraggo's men to dig in a random location for three days. However, Eldoraggo decides to use his devil fruit powers instead, and Luffy, Zoro and Tobio follow the sound. Tobio attempts to attack Eldoraggo, whose retaliation is blocked by Zoro.

Zoro and Eldoraggo's fight is cut short by Luffy's leg getting caught on a rock and flinging them both across the island; Usopp and Nami use this distraction to escape, and regroup with Luffy and Zoro. Solving a riddle on Woonan's map, the Straw Hats and Tobio find the cave in which Woonan's treasure is buried, finding Ganzo ahead of them. Ganzo reveals that he and Woonan were childhood friends, and that as children Ganzo and Woonan had fought over disagreeing with each other's dreams.

In this fight, the two were knocked off a cliff face and onto a breaking branch, and Ganzo let himself fall in order to save Woonan. Unknown to Woonan, Ganzo was saved by a passing boat, but Woonan has already set out to sea when Ganzo woke up. The group find an old house where the gold is hidden, but Eldoraggo catches up to them and fights Luffy and Zoro. Eldoraggo is defeated, and in a secret room the group find Woonan's skeleton and a message left for Ganzo.

Before dying, Woonan realized that his treasure could not make him happy, and returned all the gold he stole, leaving nothing but his skeleton and the flag he showed Ganzo before their fight. Ganzo decides to build a grave for Woonan and continue running his oden shop, while Nami manages to steal Eldoraggo's treasure. Ganzo refuses to accept the money for the oden, so that the Straw Hats will still owe him and be obligated to visit him again. As the Straw hats sail away, Tobio comments that Luffy really will become King of the Pirates some day.

== Cast ==
Character	Japanese voice actor
Monkey D. Luffy	Mayumi Tanaka
Roronoa Zoro	Kazuya Nakai
Nami	Akemi Okamura
Usopp	Kappei Yamaguchi
Eldoraggo	Kenji Utsumi
Ganzo	Takeshi Aono
Tobio	Yuka Imai
Woonan	Nachi Nozawa
Narrator	Mahito Ohba
young Ganzo	Taiki Matsuno
young Woonan	Takeshi Kusao
Danny	Shinsuke Kasai
Denny	Toshihiro Itō
Donny	Tsurumaru Sakai

== Release ==
Promotional One Piece and Digimon Carddass cards and a One Piece bandana were included with advanced bookings of the 2000 Toei Anime fair. In Japan, the film was released individually on DVD on January 21, 2001, followed by a Blu-ray release on November 21, 2009. The film was available at this lower price again on DVD and Blu-ray from November 30, 2012, to February, 2013 to coincide with the release of One Piece Film: Z.

Kazé released the film in France and Germany. The film was released on DVD and Blu-ray in France on August 24, 2011, featuring Japanese and French audio, as well as subtitles in French and Dutch subtitles; A box set of the first three One Piece films was released on 16 October 2013 on DVD and Blu-ray. In Germany, the film was released on DVD on 26 February 2011, featuring Japanese and German audio, and German subtitles. The German release also included a poster. Selecta Visión released the film in Spain on DVD and Blu-ray on February 22, 2017, featuring Japanese and Spanish audio, as well as subtitles in Spanish.

In the UK, the film was released by Manga UK exclusively in a DVD box set alongside Adventure of Spiral Island and Chopper's Kingdom on the Strange Animal Island on 28 July 2014, featuring Japanese audio and English subtitles. This was the first English-language One Piece release not to feature an English dub. Some reviewers criticized this DVD release for its poor video and audio quality and inconsistent translation to the subtitles found on the TV series releases; Jitendar Canth of My Reviewer described this release as "placeholder discs", pointing out that the films will likely by dubbed by Funimation and re-released, but also that "you're going to have a hell of a wait [for FUNimation's release]" so "don't miss out on the fun by waiting".

== Soundtrack ==
The film uses the same pieces of theme music as the TV series at that time; The opening theme song is 'We Are!' by Hiroshi Kitadani, and the film's ending theme song is 'Memories' by Maki Otsuki.

The film's original soundtrack was composed by Kouhei Tanaka, and was released as part of the album 'One Piece: Music And Song Collection' (ワンピース 歌と音楽集 / アニメ) (サウンドトラック) on March 18, 2000. This album also included the original soundtrack to the One Piece TV series and image songs sung by the Straw Hat pirates, with tracks 1 to 16 representing the soundtrack to 'One Piece: The Movie'. This album was later re-released as part of the compilation 'One Piece Eizo Ongaku Kanzenban' (ワンピース 映像音楽完全盤 / アニメサントラ) on January 31, 2007, with the racks re-ordered.

'One Piece Music And Song Collection' Track listing

1. "Kogane no dai kaizoku ūnan " (黄金の大海賊ウーナン)
2. "We Are!" (ウィーアー!) (Performed by Hiroshi Kitadani)
3. "Hara peko rufi" (はらぺこルフィ)
4. "Erudorago tōjō" (エルドラゴ登場)
5. "Sekaiichi no oden yada" (世界一のおでん矢だ)
6. "Jōriku! Kogane no shima" (上陸!黄金の島)
7. "Usoppu, yabai zo!" (ウソップ、やばいぞ!)
8. "Sakuretsu! Chōonpa!!" (炸裂!超音波!!)
9. "Ūnan to Iwazō" (ウーナンと岩蔵)
10. "Kogane to oden" (黄金とおでん)
11. "Ikari!!" (怒り!!)
12. "Gomu gomu VS goegoe" (ゴムゴム VS ゴエゴエ)
13. "Gomu gomu no bazūka!" (ゴムゴムのバズーカ!!)
14. "Ūnan kara no messēji" (ウーナンからのメッセージ)
15. "Kaizoku-ō e no funade" (海賊王への船出)
16. MEMORIES ("memories") (Performed by Maki Otsuki)
17. "Kaizoku-ō ni naru nda!" (海賊王になるんだ!)
18. "Wanted!" (Performed by Mayumi Tanaka as Luffy)
19. "Tanomoshī nakama" (たのもしい仲間)
20. "Music" (Performed by Akemi Okamura as Nami)
21. "Idainaru kairo e!" (偉大なる海路へ!)
22. "Kettō!" (決闘!)
23. "Mugiwara no jorīrojā" (麦わらのジョリーロジャー)
24. "Yatta ze! Pātida!" (やったぜ!パーティだ!!)
25. "Madamada, bōken wa tsudzuku!" (まだまだ、冒険はつづく!)

== Reception ==
The 2000 Spring Toei Anime Fair opened at number two position at the Japanese box office. In its second week, the double feature dropped to third place, before rising to the number one spot for its third and fourth weeks. In total, the film earned ¥2.16 billion at the Japanese box office.

The film's UK release received mixed reviews from critics. Jitendar Canth, of MyReviewer.com, described the film as "[playing] out like an extended episode", which lacked the grand visuals and storylines of later One Piece films and had a predictable story. However, Canth still recommended the film based on its fast pacing and comedic tone, awarding the film a 7/10 rating. Andy Hanley, of UK Anime Network, suggested that the film may have been more effective as "a TV episode or two rather than a short film" and criticized the film's pacing for taking "a little too long to get to its pivotal moments". Luke Baldock, of The Hollywood News, commented that "the animation doesn't look as good as the show here", but was satisfied with the film's humor and action.
