= Mai (singer) =

- Born: Mai Kudo (工藤 舞 Kudō Mai); July 18, 1984 (age 42)
- Origin: Ishikari, Hokkaido, Japan
- Genres: Japanese pop
- Occupation: Singer
- Label: Rhythm Zone
- Website: web.archive.org/web/20051107015603/http://www.rhythmzone.net/mai/

Mai (舞), real name Mai Kudo (工藤 舞, Kudō Mai; born July 18, 1984) is a J-Pop singer from Hokkaidō, Japan. She is a talent of the Fit One management company and part of the artists' roster of Rhythm Zone owned by Avex Entertainment Inc. She originally debuted as "Ruppina". As Ruppina, she recorded the song "Free Will" which was used as the 9th ending theme of the Japanese anime series One Piece.

== History ==
- December 2002: Released her first single as Ruppina: Free Will (One Piece 9th ending theme)
- January 2003: Officially debuts as Ruppina.
- August 2004: Released final single as Ruppina: in the name of love
- December 2005: Her music video for "Reborn" is used for the closing theme song of the Japanese TV show Hey! Hey! Hey! Music Champ beginning with the December 5 episode. She is in the nude throughout the music video. The song is also used as the theme song for the Xbox 360 game "eM" by FromSoftware. Heavy promotion by Avex continues throughout the month prior to her single debut as Mai at the end of the month.
- April 2006: Her second single "Eyes", released on April 12, 2006, seems to continue the "au naturel" theme from the first single, which is reflected in its video.
- August 2006: Her third single, Princess ∞ Candy appears in the entire nude music video
- November 2007: Her blog was revived and her musical branding was changed Ruppina+.
- June 2011: She announced a seemingly indefinite hiatus from singing due to an undisclosed issue with her voice, however she remains active on social media.

== Discography ==
=== Singles ===
- Reborn / Squair (December 28, 2005)
- Eyes / Rainbow (April 12, 2006)
- Princess Candy / Moon Tears (August 16, 2006)

=== Albums ===
- Maiself (September 6, 2006)
