= Frank Schindel =

German singer (born 1965)

- Born: 2 March 1965; Karlsruhe
- Genres: Pop
- Labels: Ariola, BMG, Sony

Frank Schindel (born 2 March 1965) is a German singer.

== Biography ==
Frank Schindel was born in March 1965 in Karlsruhe. He started playing music and played the guitar at the age of twelve. After reaching the Legal age he moved to Munich and switched to singing in his musical career; amongst other things he started the band Art Pope. He was active as a support for music groups in the field of African American music and jazz music by Johnny Guitar Watson, The Temptations, The Supremes and B.B. King. During this time he built up his own recording studio in Munich.

He often appears as a producer nowadays. In German-speaking countries, he became known in 1999 for his interpretations of the songs by the Japanese artist Kōji Wada in German for the anime of the franchises Digimon, One Piece, Pretty Cure and Yu-Gi-Oh! as well as the series Beyblade V-Force, Detective Conan and Dragon Ball Z.

Frank Schindel also belongs to the so-called "Anime Allstars" of the album series "Anime Hits", which is published by Sony Music Entertainment.

Schindel is married and has two children. In addition to his music, he works as a sound engineer for television productions such as the DSF show Heads Up - Das Sport Duell, where Alexander Müller was the director.

== Albums ==
Album name	Song name	Release year
Digimon – Digital Monsters	Leb Deinen Traum, Wir Werden Siegen, Alles Wird Gut, Vertrau Mir	2000
Digimon – Digital Monsters Vol. 2	Ich Werde Da Sein, Wir Drehn Auf, Dein Traum Wird Wahr	2001
Dragonball Z – Der Offizielle Soundtrack Zur TV-Serie	Die Ruhe Vor Dem Sturm	2001
Dragonball Z Vol. 2 – Der Offizielle Soundtrack Zur TV-Serie	Spiel Mit Deiner Kraft, Engel (Das Japanische TV-Ending)	2002
Yu-Gi-Oh! – Die Besten Songs Zur TV-Serie	Das Spiel Ist Unsere Welt	2003
One Piece – Der Offizielle Soundtrack Zur TV-Serie	Ich werde Wie Du	2003
Beyblade V-Force – Der Offizielle Soundtrack Zur TV-Serie	Niemals Untergehn	2004
Digimon – Digital Monsters Season Four	Wenn Das Feuer in Dir Brennt, Blader, With Broken Wings, Die Hyper Spirit Digitation	2004
Pretty Cure – Der Offizielle Soundtrack Zur Serie	Das Licht Des Regenbogens	2005
Detektiv Conan – Der Offizielle Soundtrack	Niemals Zu Ende Gehen	2006
