= Hiroshi Kitadani =

Japanese singer (born 1968)

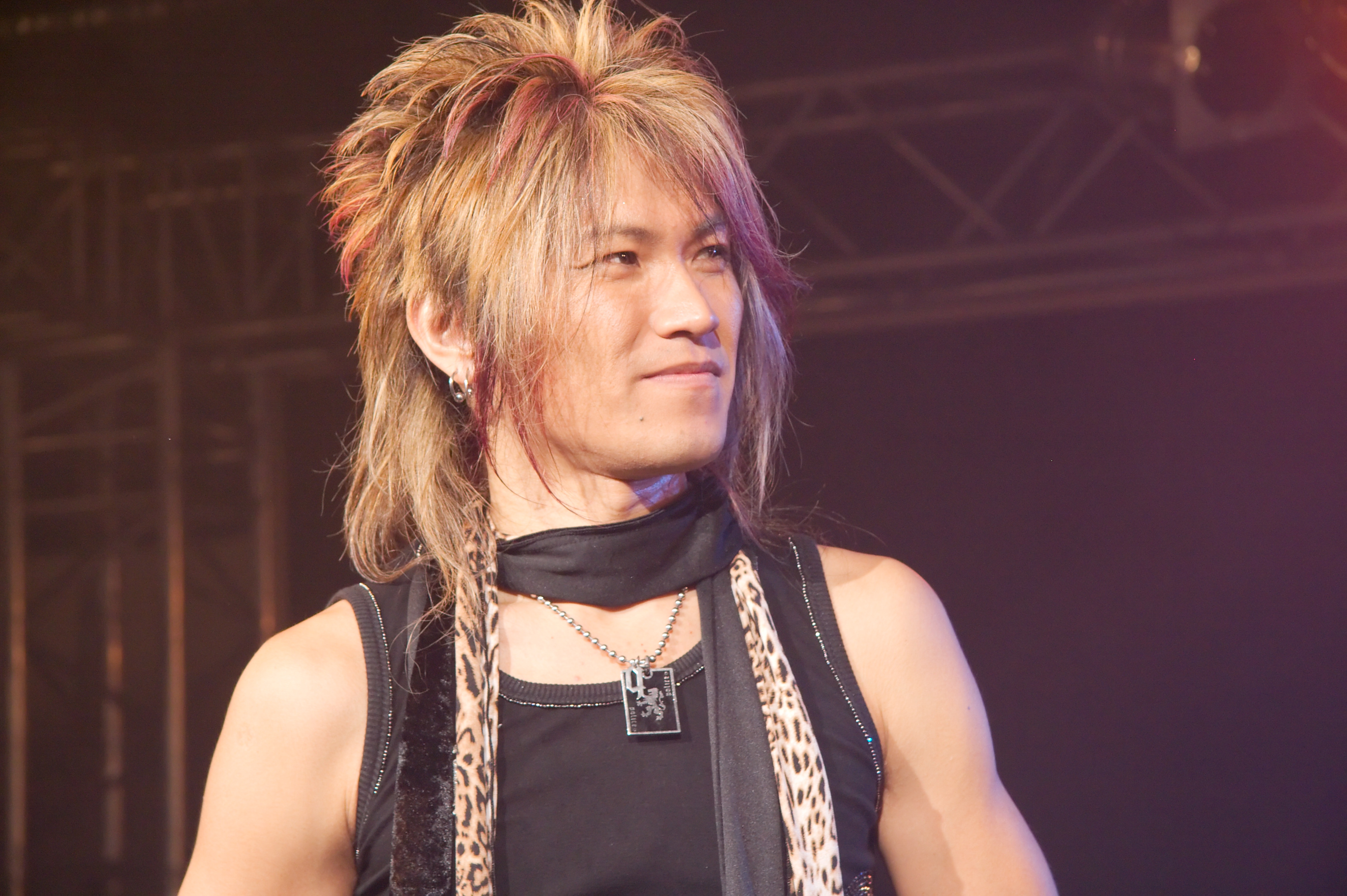
- Kitadani performing as part of JAM Project 2008 in Paris

Background information
- Born: Hiroshi Kitadani (北谷 洋, Kitadani Hiroshi); August 24, 1968 (age 58); Susa, Yamaguchi, Japan
- Genres: J-pop, Anison
- Occupation: Singer
- Instruments: Vocals, guitar
- Years active: 1994–present

Hiroshi Kitadani (きただに ひろし, Kitadani Hiroshi; born August 24, 1968) is a Japanese singer, who primarily performs theme songs and other songs in anime. He also works behind the scenes of many songs. He currently works with JAM Project. He is most known for singing the first, fifteenth, nineteenth (with Kishidan), twenty-second and twenty-sixth opening themes of the popular anime series One Piece.

== Career ==
Hiroshi Kitadani began his singing career in 1994 as a member of the musical trio called Stagger. After the band released an album through Warner Music Japan, he released a self-titled album in 1999. Shortly after, he became globally recognized for singing One Piece's popular opening theme song, "We Are!" Soon, he paired up with fellow musicians in the musical act Lapis Lazuli in December of the same year. The group released a mini-album before Kitadani left.

In 2003, his big break came when he joined JAM Project. He debuted during the group's second live concert, but did not participate in the group's studio recording until the single "Nageki no Rozario" was released. From then on, Kitadani became a prominent figure in the anison industry, but he was not singing many theme songs regularly like his peers in the group. By the time of JAM Project's first world tour, his popularity rose dramatically, and he became known to fans across the globe.

In 2008, Hiroshi released his first full-length studio album, R-New, and JAM Project bandmate Masami Okui supplied back-up vocals and harmonization on many of the tracks on the album. In the accompanying documentary, he worked on the tracks with his friends in a small recording studio. While in the process of writing songs, he demonstrated his cooking skills, preparing meals for himself in his own apartment.

On August 8, 2012, Hiroshi released his second full-length album, Real.

Throughout his journey as an anison artist, Kitadani has been to many events with JAM Project members. He had performed in Latin America with his friends Masaaki Endoh and Hironobu Kageyama at concert events such as Anime Friends. He has also participated in Animelo, an annual summer anison music festival where JAM Project is a recurring guest. He also collaborated with Aki Misato to produce anime theme songs, forming a group called SV Tribe along with Masaaki Endoh.

== Discography ==
=== Albums ===
1. [2008.08.27] R-new
2. [2012.08.08] Real

=== Best album ===
1. [2014.08.27] SCORE

=== Singles ===
1. [1999.10.20] We Are! (ウィーアー！)
2. [2002.03.20] Endless Hope / Hatenaki Kibō (果てなき希望)
3. [2002.04.20] Bakutou Sengen! Daigunder / We are the Heroes (爆闘宣言!ダイガンダー / We are the Heroes)
4. [2002.04.27] Totsugeki Gunka Gun Parade March (突撃軍歌ガンパレード・マーチ)
5. [2002.09.26] Revolution
6. [2003.06.25] Seinaru Kemonotachi (聖なるけものたち)
7. [2004.02.25] Taiyou no Transform!! / Calling you (太陽のTransform!!)
8. [2006.02.15] Madan Senki Ryuukendou (魔弾戦記リュウケンドー)
9. [2006.08.23] Justice of Darkness ~Youkai Ningen Bem no Theme / Hachigatsu no Eien (Justice of darkness ～妖怪人間ベムのテーマ / 8月の永遠)
10. [2007.11.21] Endless Dream
11. [2009.11.25] Rescue Taisou (レスキュー体操)
12. [2011.10.26] U-n-d-e-r—STANDING! (SV Tribe)
13. [2011.11.16] We Go! (ウィーゴー！)
14. [2013.12.18] Baku Atsu! Gaist Crusher (爆アツ!ガイストクラッシャー)
15. [2016.06.26] We Can! (ウィーキャン! )
16. [2019.07.07] Over the top (オバー ざー トップ)
17. [2023.07.22] Bokura no Spectra" (僕らのスペクトラ)
18. [2024.01.07] Āssu! / Us! (あーーっす！)
