= List of Sega Saturn games =

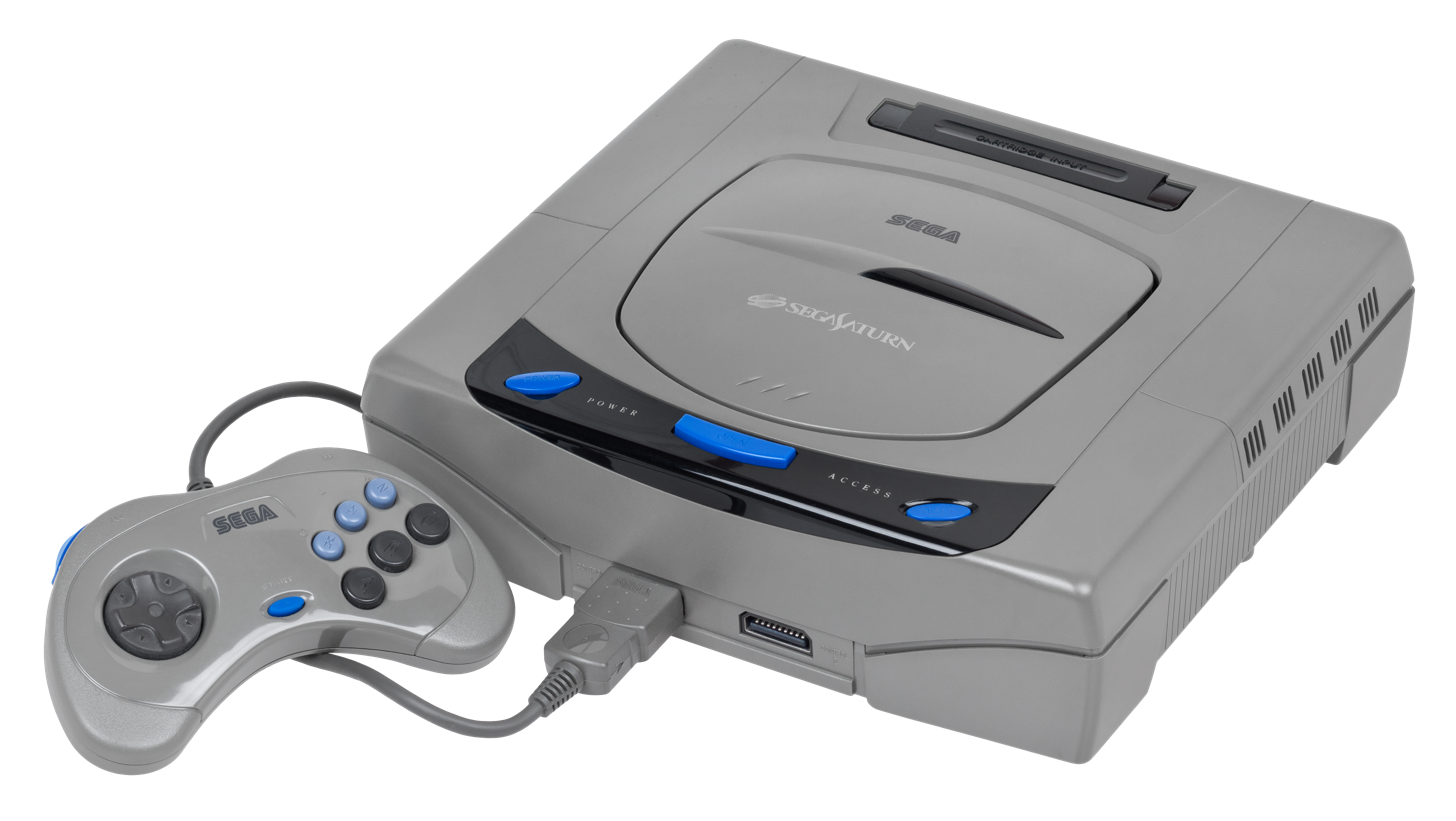
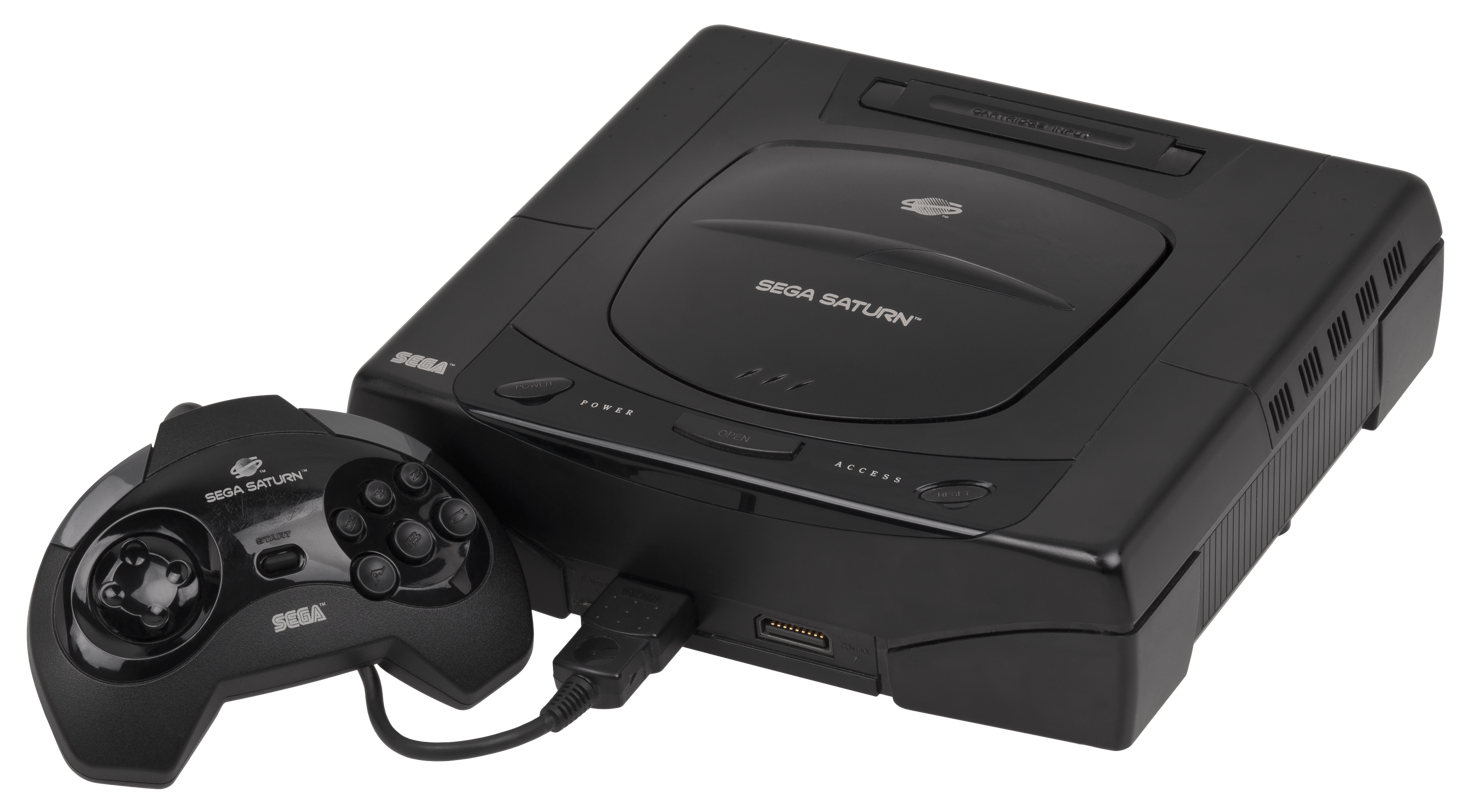
The Japanese (top) and international (bottom) Sega Saturn

The Sega Saturn (Note: Sega Saturn (Japanese: セガサターン, Hepburn: Sega Satān)) is a 32-bit fifth-generation home video game console that was developed by Sega and first released on November 22, 1994. Its games are in CD-ROM format, and its game library contains several arcade ports as well as original titles. There are 1028 (Note: This number is always up to date by this script) games on this list not including non-game software and compilations of Saturn games. 775 of those games were released as Japan-only exclusives, which makes up 75% of the list. For games that were announced or in development for the Saturn, but never released, see the list of cancelled Sega Saturn games.

== Games ==
Title(s)	Developer(s)	Publisher(s)	NA	PAL	JP
2Tax Gold	Atelier Double	Human Entertainment	Unreleased	Unreleased	January 17, 1997
3D Baseball^{NA} 3D Baseball: The Majors^{JP}	Crystal Dynamics	Crystal Dynamics^{NA} BMG Japan^{JP}	December 11, 1996	Unreleased	January 31, 1997
3D Lemmings	Perfect Entertainment	Psygnosis^{EU} Imagineer^{JP}	Unreleased	July 5, 1996	August 23, 1996
3x3 Eyes: Kyūsei Kōshu S	Nihon Create	Nihon Create	Unreleased	Unreleased	April 19, 1996
6 Inch My Darling	KID	KID	Unreleased	Unreleased	December 23, 1998
Actua Golf^{EU/JP} VR Golf '97^{NA}	Gremlin Interactive	Gremlin Interactive^{EU} VR Sports^{NA} Naxat Soft^{JP}	December 20, 1996	October 1996	April 4, 1997
Actua Soccer Club Edition	Gremlin Interactive	Gremlin Interactive	Unreleased	1997	Unreleased
Advanced V.G.	TGL	TGL	Unreleased	Unreleased	March 14, 1997
Advanced World War: Sennen Teikoku no Kôbô: Last of the Millennium	Sega	Sega	Unreleased	Unreleased	March 20, 1997
AI Igo	ISCO	ASCII Something Good	Unreleased	Unreleased	July 11, 1997
AI Shōgi	Something Good	SoftBank Corp.	Unreleased	Unreleased	August 25, 1995
AI Shōgi 2	ASCII Something Good	ASCII Something Good	Unreleased	Unreleased	June 11, 1998
Air Management '96	Koei	Koei	Unreleased	Unreleased	March 22, 1996
Airs Adventure	Game Studio	Game Studio	Unreleased	Unreleased	December 20, 1996
Akumajō Dracula X: Gekka no Yasōkyoku (Castlevania: Symphony of the Night)	Konami Computer Entertainment Nagoya	Konami	Unreleased	Unreleased	June 25, 1998
Albert Odyssey: Legend of Eldean	Sunsoft	Sunsoft^{JP} Working Designs^{NA}	July 23, 1997	Unreleased	August 9, 1996
Album Club: Mune Kyun Saint Paulia Jogakuin	Societa Daikanyama	Societa Daikanyama	Unreleased	Unreleased	July 11, 1997
Alien Trilogy	Probe Entertainment	Acclaim Entertainment	August 13, 1996	September 4, 1996	August 30, 1996
All-Star Baseball '97 featuring Frank Thomas	Iguana Entertainment	Acclaim Entertainment	May 29, 1997	Unreleased	Unreleased
Alone in the Dark 2^{JP} Alone in the Dark: Jack is Back^{EU} Alone in the Dark: One-Eyed Jack's Revenge^{NA}	Infogrames	Electronic Arts Victor^{JP} Infogrames^{EU} I•Motion^{NA}	August 6, 1996	May 1996	February 23, 1996
Amagi Shien	Success	Clip House	Unreleased	Unreleased	February 14, 1997
America Ōdan Ultra Quiz	Pegasus Japan	Victor Entertainment	Unreleased	Unreleased	October 27, 1997
Amok	Lemon	Scavenger^{WW} Koei^{JP}	January 17, 1997	March 13, 1997	June 20, 1997
Andretti Racing	Press Start Inc.	EA Sports	December 20, 1996	February 7, 1997	Unreleased
AnEarth Fantasy Stories: The First Volume	MediaWorks	MediaWorks	Unreleased	Unreleased	March 28, 1997
Angel Graffiti S: Anata e no Profile	Astrovision	Coconuts Japan	Unreleased	Unreleased	July 25, 1997
Angel Paradise Vol. 1: Sakaki Yūko: Koi no Yokan in Hollywood	Scarab	Sammy	Unreleased	Unreleased	April 19, 1996
Angel Paradise Vol. 2: Yoshino Kimika: Isshoni I-ta-i in Hawaii	Scarab	Sammy	Unreleased	Unreleased	September 13, 1996
Angelique Duet	Koei	Koei	Unreleased	Unreleased	July 30, 1998
Angelique Special	Koei	Koei	Unreleased	Unreleased	March 29, 1996
Angelique Special 2	Koei	Koei	Unreleased	Unreleased	April 4, 1997
Another Memories	Starlight Marry	Starlight Marry	Unreleased	Unreleased	July 2, 1998
Aponashi Girls: Olympos	Human Entertainment	Human Entertainment	Unreleased	Unreleased	December 20, 1996
Arcade's Greatest Hits: The Atari Collection 1	Digital Eclipse	Midway^{NA} GT Interactive^{PAL}	July 7, 1997	March 1998	Unreleased
Arcana Strikes	Takara; Red Company	Takara	Unreleased	Unreleased	December 11, 1997
Area 51	Tantalus Entertainment; Perfect Entertainment	Midway^{NA} SoftBank Corp.^{JP} GT Interactive^{PAL}	November 20, 1996	March 14, 1997	February 7, 1997
Arthur to Astaroth no Nazomakaimura: Incredible Toons	Magical Formation	Capcom	Unreleased	Unreleased	August 30, 1996
Assault Rigs	Perfect Entertainment	SoftBank Corp.	Unreleased	Unreleased	September 11, 1997
Assault Suit Leynos 2	NCS	Masaya	Unreleased	Unreleased	February 21, 1997
Astal	Sega	Sega	September 27, 1995	Unreleased	April 28, 1995
Astra Superstars	Santaclaus	Sunsoft	Unreleased	Unreleased	August 6, 1998
Asuka 120% Limited: Burning Fest. Limited	Fill-in-Cafe	ASK Kodansha	Unreleased	Unreleased	October 9, 1997
Atlantis: The Lost Tales	Cryo Interactive	Sega	Unreleased	March 27, 1998	Unreleased
Ayakashi Ninden Kunoichiban Plus	Zero System	Shōeisha	Unreleased	Unreleased	April 9, 1998
BackGuiner: Yomigaeru Yûsya-tati: Hisyô-hen "Uragiri no Senzyô"	Ving	Ving	Unreleased	Unreleased	October 1, 1998
BackGuiner: Yomigaeru Yûsya-tati: Kakusei-hen "Guiner Tensei"	Ving	Ving	Unreleased	Unreleased	July 30, 1998
Baku Baku Animal^{JP} Baku Baku^{WW}	Sega	Sega	June 19, 1996	May 1996	November 10, 1995
Bakuretsu Hunter	Betop	I'MAX	Unreleased	Unreleased	April 26, 1996
Bakuretsu Hunter R	Starchild	King Records	Unreleased	Unreleased	August 8, 1997
Bakushou All Yoshimoto Quiz Ou Ketteisen DX	Yoshimoto Kogyo	Yoshimoto Kogyo	Unreleased	Unreleased	December 1, 1995
Baldy Land	Creative Edge Software	Banpresto	Unreleased	Unreleased	November 26, 1998
Baroque	Sting Entertainment	Entertainment Software Publishing	Unreleased	Unreleased	May 21, 1998
Bases Loaded '96: Double Header^{NA} Moero!! Pro Yakyû '95 Double Header^{JP}	Jaleco	Jaleco	March 1996	Unreleased	November 22, 1995
Batman Forever: The Arcade Game	Iguana UK	Acclaim Entertainment	November 21, 1996	November 16, 1996	February 14, 1997
Batsugun	Gazelle	Banpresto	Unreleased	Unreleased	October 25, 1996
Battle Arena Toshinden Remix^{WW} Toshinden S^{JP}	Nextech	Sega	March 27, 1996	March 29, 1996	November 24, 1995
Battle Arena Toshinden URA^{WW} Toshinden URA^{JP}	Nextech	Takara^{JP} Sega^{WW}	November 14, 1996	February 6, 1997	September 27, 1996
Battle Athletes: Daiundoukai	AIC	Increment P	Unreleased	Unreleased	December 13, 1996
Battle Garegga	Raizing	Electronic Arts	Unreleased	Unreleased	February 26, 1998
Battle Monsters	Scarab	Naxat Soft^{JP} Acclaim Entertainment^{WW}	September 30, 1996	1996	June 2, 1995
Battle Stations	Realtime Associates	Electronic Arts	May 21, 1997	May 1997	Unreleased
BattleSport	Unexpected Development	Acclaim Entertainment	July 1997	Unreleased	Unreleased
Beach de Reach!	Natsu System	Mainichi Communications	Unreleased	Unreleased	August 20, 1998
Big Ichigeki! Pachi-Slot Daikouryaku: Universal Museum	Nihon Syscom	ASK Kodansha	Unreleased	Unreleased	June 14, 1996
Big Thanks Super Keirin: Dream With Keirin 50 Years	Aspect	VAP	Unreleased	Unreleased	1998 (Note: Released exclusively to attendees of the Japan Keirin Autorace's 50th anniversary events around that same year.)
Bishōjo Hanafuda Kikō Michinoku Hitō Koi Monogatari Special	O-TWO inc.	FOG Inc.	Unreleased	Unreleased	December 11, 1997
Bishōjo Senshi Sailor Moon SuperS: Various Emotion	Angel	Angel	Unreleased	Unreleased	November 29, 1996
Bishōjo Variety Game: Rapyulus Panic	Shōeisha	Shōeisha	Unreleased	Unreleased	April 26, 1996
Black Dawn	Point of View	Virgin Interactive Entertainment	1996	1997	April 25, 1997
Black Fire	NovaLogic	Sega^{NA} Virgin Interactive Entertainment^{JP/PAL}	November 10, 1995	June 28, 1996	December 22, 1995
Black/Matrix	Flight-Plan	NEC Interchannel	Unreleased	Unreleased	August 27, 1998
Blam! Machinehead^{WW} Machine Head^{NA}	Core Design	Core Design^{PAL} Eidos Interactive^{NA} Virgin Interactive Entertainment^{JP}	November 25, 1996	September 1996	May 23, 1997
Blast Chamber	Attention to Detail	Activision	December 20, 1996	November 13, 1996	Unreleased
Blast Wind	Technosoft	Technosoft	Unreleased	Unreleased	January 17, 1997
Blazing Dragons	Illusions Gaming Company	Crystal Dynamics	October 31, 1996	November 1996	Unreleased
Blue Breaker: Ken yori mo hohoemi o	Success	Human Entertainment	Unreleased	Unreleased	November 27, 1997
Blue Seed: Kushinada Hirokuden	SIMS	Sega	Unreleased	Unreleased	June 23, 1995
Body Special 264: Girls in Motion Puzzle Vol. 2	Japan Media Programming	Yanoman	Unreleased	Unreleased	August 2, 1996
Bomberman Wars	Metro	Hudson Soft	Unreleased	Unreleased	April 16, 1998
Bottom of the 9th	Konami	Konami	October 18, 1996	Unreleased	Unreleased
Bouken Katsugeki Monomono	Shōeisha	Shōeisha	Unreleased	Unreleased	July 24, 1997
Brain Battle Q	Clef	Clef	Unreleased	Unreleased	March 15, 1996
Brain Dead 13	ReadySoft	ReadySoft^{NA} Coconuts Japan^{JP}	September 30, 1996	Unreleased	October 10, 1996
Break Point Tennis^{NA} Break Point^{PAL/JP}	Smart Dog	Ocean Software^{WW} Pack-In-Video^{JP}	November 21, 1996	December 1996	June 27, 1997
BreakThru!	Shōeisha	Shōeisha	Unreleased	Unreleased	September 22, 1995
Bubble Bobble featuring Rainbow Islands	Probe Entertainment	Acclaim Entertainment	September 3, 1996	September 1996	Unreleased
Bubble Symphony	Ving	Ving	Unreleased	Unreleased	November 27, 1997
Bug!	Realtime Associates	Sega	July 1995	September 1995	December 8, 1995
Bug Too!	Realtime Associates; SegaSoft	Sega	December 6, 1996	April 24, 1997	January 31, 1997
Bulk Slash	CAProduction	Hudson Soft	Unreleased	Unreleased	July 11, 1997
Burning Rangers	Sonic Team	Sega	May 28, 1998	June 19, 1998	February 26, 1998
Bust-A-Move 2: Arcade Edition^{WW} Puzzle Bobble 2X^{JP}	Taito	Taito^{JP} Acclaim Entertainment^{WW}	September 24, 1996	August 28, 1996	July 26, 1996
Bust-A-Move 3^{WW} Puzzle Bobble 3^{JP}	Taito	Taito^{JP} Natsume Inc.^{NA} Acclaim Entertainment^{PAL}	December 11, 1997	1997	March 28, 1997
Can Can Bunny Extra	Cocktail Soft	KID	Unreleased	Unreleased	October 2, 1997
Can Can Bunny Premiere	Cocktail Soft	KID	Unreleased	Unreleased	April 5, 1996
Can Can Bunny Premiere 2	Cocktail Soft	KID	Unreleased	Unreleased	December 20, 1996
Capcom Generation: Dai 1 Shū - Gekitsuiō no Jidai	Capcom	Capcom	Unreleased	Unreleased	August 27, 1998
Capcom Generation: Dai 2 Shū - Makai to Kishi	Capcom	Capcom	Unreleased	Unreleased	September 23, 1998
Capcom Generation: Dai 3 Shū - Koko ni Rekishi Hajimaru	Capcom	Capcom	Unreleased	Unreleased	October 15, 1998
Capcom Generation: Dai 4 Shū - Kokô no Eiyû	Capcom	Capcom	Unreleased	Unreleased	November 12, 1998
Capcom Generation: Dai 5 Shū - Kakutôka-tati	Capcom	Capcom	Unreleased	Unreleased	December 3, 1998
Casper	Funcom	Interplay Productions	September 27, 1996	September 13, 1996	April 25, 1997
Cat the Ripper: 13-ninme no Tanteishi	Tonkin House	Tonkin House	Unreleased	Unreleased	July 18, 1997
Chaos Control	Infogrames	Virgin Interactive Entertainment^{JP} Infogrames^{PAL}	Unreleased	September 1996	December 29, 1995
Chaos Control Remix	Infogrames	Virgin Interactive Entertainment	Unreleased	Unreleased	November 22, 1997
Chibi Maruko-Chan no Taisen Pazuru Dama	Konami	Konami	Unreleased	Unreleased	December 15, 1995
Choro Q Park	Nextech	Takara	Unreleased	Unreleased	March 26, 1998
Chō Aniki: Kyūkyoku Muteki Ginga Saikyō Otoko	Pre-Stage	Masaya	Unreleased	Unreleased	March 29, 1996
Chōjikū Yōsai Makurosu: Ai Oboete Imasu ka	Scarab	Bandai Visual	Unreleased	Unreleased	June 6, 1997
Christmas Nights	Sonic Team	Sega	December 12, 1996	November 14, 1996	November 22, 1996
Civilization: Shin Sekai Shichidai Bunmei	MicroProse	Asmik	Unreleased	Unreleased	May 2, 1997
Cleopatra Fortune	Taito; Natsume	Taito	Unreleased	Unreleased	February 14, 1997
ClockWerx	Axes Art Amuse	Tokuma Shoten	Unreleased	Unreleased	August 9, 1996
Clockwork Knight	Sega	Sega	May 11, 1995	July 8, 1995	December 9, 1994
Clockwork Knight 2	Sega	Sega	December 1995	October 27, 1995	July 28, 1995
Code R	Quintet	Quintet / Entertainment Software Publishing	Unreleased	Unreleased	July 9, 1998
College Slam	Iguana UK	Acclaim Entertainment	February 1996	Unreleased	Unreleased
Command & Conquer	Westwood Studios	Virgin Interactive Entertainment^{PAL} Westwood Studios^{NA} Sega^{JP}	December 1996	December 6, 1996	April 25, 1997
Congo The Movie: The Lost City of Zinj	Jumpin' Jack Software	Sega	1996	Unreleased	Unreleased
Contra: Legacy of War	Appaloosa Interactive	Konami	May 21, 1997	Unreleased	Unreleased
The Conveni	Masterpiece	Human Entertainment	Unreleased	Unreleased	March 20, 1997
The Conveni 2	Masterpiece	Human Entertainment	Unreleased	Unreleased	March 12, 1998
Corpse Killer: Graveyard Edition	Digital Pictures	Digital Pictures	November 10, 1995	Unreleased	Unreleased
Cotton 2: Magical Night Dreams	Success	Success	Unreleased	Unreleased	December 4, 1997
Cotton Boomerang	Success	Success	Unreleased	Unreleased	October 8, 1998
Courier Crisis	New Level Software	GT Interactive^{NA} BMG Japan^{JP} Sega^{EU}	December 20, 1997	May 15, 1998	March 26, 1998
Creature Shock^{JP} Creature Shock: Special Edition^{NA}	Interactive Studios	Data East	1996	Unreleased	January 19, 1996
CrimeWave	Eidos Interactive	Eidos Interactive^{WW} Virgin Interactive Entertainment^{JP}	March 10, 1997	November 8, 1996	June 27, 1997
Criticom^{NA} Criticom: The Critical Combat^{JP}	Point of View	Vic Tokai	March 1996	Unreleased	February 28, 1997
Croc: Legend of the Gobbos^{WW} Croc! Pau Pau Island^{JP}	Argonaut Software	Fox Interactive^{WW} MediaQuest^{JP}	November 24, 1997	October 10, 1997	March 26, 1998
Cross Romance: Ai to Mahjong to Hanafuda to	Digitalware; Nichibutsu	Nichibutsu	Unreleased	Unreleased	October 9, 1997
Cross Tantei Monogatari: Motsureta Nanatsu no Labyrinth	WorkJam	WorkJam	Unreleased	Unreleased	June 25, 1998
The Crow: City of Angels	Gray Matter	Acclaim Entertainment	March 12, 1997	February 26, 1997	April 25, 1997
Crows: The Battle Action for SegaSaturn	Athena	Athena	Unreleased	Unreleased	December 18, 1997
Crusader: No Remorse	Realtime Associates	Electronic Arts	December 24, 1996	March 14, 1997	Unreleased
Crypt Killer^{WW} Henry Explorers^{JP}	Konami Computer Entertainment Tokyo	Konami	April 24, 1997	March 21, 1997	March 7, 1997
Cube Battler: Anna Mirai-hen	Yanoman	Yanoman	Unreleased	Unreleased	May 23, 1997
Cube Battler: Debugger Shouhen	Yanoman	Yanoman	Unreleased	Unreleased	February 28, 1997
Culdcept	OmiyaSoft	OmiyaSoft	Unreleased	Unreleased	October 30, 1997
Cyberbots: Full Metal Madness	Capcom	Capcom	Unreleased	Unreleased	March 28, 1997
Cyber Doll	Betop	I'MAX	Unreleased	Unreleased	August 9, 1996
Cyberia	Xatrix Entertainment	Interplay Productions	1996	April 19, 1996	February 16, 1996
Cyber Speedway^{WW} Gran Chaser^{JP}	Nextech	Sega	1995	December 1995	May 26, 1995
D	Warp	Acclaim Entertainment	March 5, 1996	March 8, 1996	July 28, 1995
D-Xhird	Nextech	Takara	Unreleased	Unreleased	May 30, 1997
Daibouken: St. Elmo's no Kiseki	Soft Office; FAB	Pai	Unreleased	Unreleased	April 19, 1996
Daikōkai Jidai II	Koei	Koei	Unreleased	Unreleased	March 28, 1997
Daikōkai Jidai Gaiden	Koei	Koei	Unreleased	Unreleased	January 29, 1998
Daina Airan	Game Arts	Game Arts	Unreleased	Unreleased	February 14, 1997
Daisenryaku Strong Style	SystemSoft; Dual	Oz Club	Unreleased	Unreleased	June 27, 1997
Daisuki	Success	GAGA Communications	Unreleased	Unreleased	July 4, 1997
Daitoride	Metro	Metro	Unreleased	Unreleased	June 28, 1996
Darius II	I.T.L	Taito	Unreleased	1996	June 7, 1996
Darius Gaiden	Aisystem Tokyo	Taito^{JP} Acclaim Entertainment^{WW}	1996	March 1996	December 15, 1995
Dark Hunter: (Ge) Youma no Mori	Koei	Koei	Unreleased	Unreleased	May 30, 1997
Dark Hunter: (Jou) Ijigen Gakuen	Koei	Koei	Unreleased	Unreleased	April 4, 1997
Dark Legend^{NA} Suiko Enbu^{JP}	Data East	Data East	October 1, 1995	Unreleased	August 11, 1995
Dark Savior	Climax Entertainment	Climax Entertainment^{JP} Sega^{WW}	December 12, 1996	February 20, 1997	August 30, 1996
Dark Seed	Cyberdreams	GAGA Communications	Unreleased	Unreleased	July 7, 1995
Dark Seed II	Cyberdreams; Destiny Software Productions	Emotion Digital Software / B-Factory	Unreleased	Unreleased	August 29, 1997
Darklight Conflict	Rage Software	Electronic Arts	July 1, 1997	July 1997	Unreleased
Daytona USA	Sega AM2	Sega	May 11, 1995	July 8, 1995	April 1, 1995
Daytona USA: Championship Circuit Edition^{WW} Daytona USA: Circuit Edition^{JP}	Sega AM3	Sega	November 21, 1996	November 14, 1996	January 24, 1997
Daytona USA CCE NetLink Edition	Sega AM3	Sega	February 16, 1998	Unreleased	Unreleased
Death Crimson	Ecole Software	Ecole Software	Unreleased	Unreleased	August 9, 1996
Death Throttle: Kakuzetsu Toshi kara no Dasshutsu	Infini Entertainment Technology	MediaQuest	Unreleased	Unreleased	July 12, 1996
DeathMask	Electric Dreams Inc.	Vantan International	Unreleased	Unreleased	February 16, 1996
Dead or Alive	Team Ninja	Tecmo	Unreleased	Unreleased	October 9, 1997
DecAthlete^{WW} Athlete Kings^{PAL}	Sega AM3	Sega	July 17, 1996	September 1996	July 12, 1996
Deep Fear	System Sacom; Sega CS2 R&D; ISCO; Highwaystar	Sega	Unreleased	July 24, 1998^{EU} September 18, 1998^{UK}	July 16, 1998
Defcon 5	Millennium Interactive	Data East^{NA} Multisoft^{JP} GT Interactive^{PAL}	1996	June 1996	June 7, 1996
Dejig Aqua World	Masudaya	Masudaya	Unreleased	Unreleased	April 25, 1997
Dejig Lassen: Art Collection	Masudaya	Masudaya	Unreleased	Unreleased	December 4, 1997
Dejig McKnight: Art Collection	Masudaya	Masudaya	Unreleased	Unreleased	December 4, 1997
Dejig Tin Toy	Masudaya	Masudaya	Unreleased	Unreleased	April 25, 1997
Delisoba Deluxe	Cave	TBS	Unreleased	Unreleased	199?
Denpa Syônenteki Game	Hudson Soft	Hudson Soft	Unreleased	Unreleased	March 5, 1998
Densetsu no Ōga Batoru	Riverhillsoft	Riverhillsoft	Unreleased	Unreleased	November 1, 1996
Densha de Go! EX	Taito	Takara	Unreleased	Unreleased	October 1, 1998
Derby Stallion	ParityBit	ASCII	Unreleased	Unreleased	March 25, 1999
Dero~n Dero Dero	Tecmo	Tecmo	Unreleased	Unreleased	January 26, 1996
Desire	C's Ware	Imadio	Unreleased	Unreleased	September 11, 1997
Destruction Derby	Perfect Entertainment	Psygnosis^{PAL} SoftBank Corp.^{JP}	Unreleased	August 15, 1996	September 20, 1996
Detana TwinBee Yahho! Deluxe Pack	Konami	Konami	Unreleased	Unreleased	September 29, 1995
Device Reign	Starlight Marry; Studio Orphee	MediaWorks	Unreleased	Unreleased	February 25, 1999
Devil Summoner: Soul Hackers	Atlus	Atlus	Unreleased	Unreleased	November 13, 1997
Dezaemon 2	Athena	Athena	Unreleased	Unreleased	October 9, 1997
Die Hard Arcade^{WW} Dynamite Deka^{JP}	Sega AM1; Sega Technical Institute	Sega	March 18, 1997	February 24, 1997	January 24, 1997
Die Hard Trilogy	Probe Entertainment	Fox Interactive^{WW} Sega^{JP}	January 21, 1997	February 28, 1997	January 31, 1997
Digital Ange: Dennō Tenshi SS	Koga Game Factory	Tokuma Shoten Intermedia	Unreleased	Unreleased	June 20, 1997
Digital Dance Mix Vol. 1 Namie Amuro	Sega AM2	Sega	Unreleased	Unreleased	January 10, 1997
Digital Monster Ver. S: Digimon Tamers	Tose	Bandai	Unreleased	Unreleased	September 23, 1998
Digital Pinball: Last Gladiators^{JP} Last Gladiators^{NA} Digital Pinball^{PAL}	KAZe	KAZe^{JP} Time Warner Interactive^{NA} Sega^{PAL}	November 1995	September 1995	June 23, 1995
Digital Pinball: Last Gladiators Ver.9.7	KAZe	KAZe	Unreleased	Unreleased	September 11, 1997
Digital Pinball: Necronomicon	KAZe	KAZe	Unreleased	Unreleased	November 15, 1996
Discworld	Perfect Entertainment	Psygnosis^{EU} Media Entertainment^{JP}	Unreleased	August 15, 1996	December 13, 1996
Discworld II: Missing Presumed...!?	Perfect Entertainment	Sega	Unreleased	September 4, 1997	Unreleased
DJ Wars	Exit	Spike	Unreleased	Unreleased	December 18, 1997
Dōkyūsei 2	ELF	NEC Interchannel	Unreleased	Unreleased	July 11, 1997
Dōkyūsei: if	ELF	NEC Interchannel	Unreleased	Unreleased	August 9, 1996
DoDonPachi	Cave	Atlus	Unreleased	Unreleased	September 18, 1997
DonPachi	Cave	Atlus	Unreleased	Unreleased	April 26, 1996
Doom	Rage Software	GT Interactive^{WW} SoftBank Corp.^{JP}	March 26, 1997	1997	July 11, 1997
Doraemon: Nobita to Fukkatsu no Hoshi	Sakata SAS	Epoch	Unreleased	Unreleased	March 15, 1996
Double Switch	Digital Pictures	Digital Pictures	1995	Unreleased	Unreleased
Doukoku Soshite...	Sakata SAS; Studio Line	Data East	Unreleased	Unreleased	February 26, 1998
Doukoku Soshite... Final Edition	Data East	Data East	Unreleased	Unreleased	August 6, 1998
Dragon Ball Z: Idainaru Dragon Ball Densetsu^{JP} Dragon Ball Z: The Legend^{EU}	BEC; Tose	Bandai	Unreleased	1996	May 31, 1996
Dragon Ball Z: Shin Butōden	Tose	Bandai	Unreleased	Unreleased	November 17, 1995
Dragon Force	J-Force; Sega; Working Designs	Sega^{JP/PAL} Working Designs^{NA}	December 12, 1996	August 28, 1997	March 29, 1996
Dragon Force II: Kamisarishi Daichi ni	Sega	Sega	Unreleased	Unreleased	April 2, 1998
DragonHeart: Fire & Steel	Funcom	Acclaim Entertainment	November 13, 1996	December 1996	Unreleased
Dragon Master Silk	Gimmick House	Datam Polystar	Unreleased	Unreleased	March 28, 1997
Dragon's Dream	Sega; Fujitsu	Sega	Unreleased	Unreleased	December 20, 1997
Dream Generation: Koi ka? Shigoto ka!?...	Reindeer	Masaya	Unreleased	Unreleased	July 30, 1998
Druid: Yami he no Tuisekisya	Synthetic Dimensions	Koei	Unreleased	Unreleased	July 2, 1998
Duke Nukem 3D	Lobotomy Software	Sega	October 29, 1997	October 30, 1997	Unreleased
Dungeon Master Nexus	Victor Interactive Software	Victor Interactive Software	Unreleased	Unreleased	March 26, 1998
Dungeons & Dragons Collection	Capcom	Capcom	Unreleased	Unreleased	March 4, 1999
DX Jinsei Game	Takara	Takara	Unreleased	Unreleased	December 15, 1995
DX Jinsei Game II	Takara	Takara	Unreleased	Unreleased	July 24, 1997
DX Nippon Tokkyuu Ryokou Game	Japan Media Programming	Takara	Unreleased	Unreleased	December 20, 1996
Earthworm Jim 2	Screaming Pink	Playmates Interactive Entertainment^{NA} Virgin Interactive Entertainment^{PAL} Takara^{JP}	May 15, 1996	October 1996	November 11, 1996
Eberouge	Japan Media Programming	Takara	Unreleased	Unreleased	May 30, 1997
Eberouge Special: Koi to Mahô no Gakuen Seikatsu	Japan Media Programming	Takara	Unreleased	Unreleased	June 11, 1998
Eisei Meijin	Konami	Konami	Unreleased	Unreleased	September 29, 1995
Eisei Meijin II	Konami Computer Entertainment Tokyo	Konami	Unreleased	Unreleased	December 20, 1996
Eiyū Shigan: Gal Act Heroism	Microcabin	Microcabin	Unreleased	Unreleased	April 16, 1998
Elevator Action Returns	Ving	Ving	Unreleased	Unreleased	February 14, 1997
Elf o Karu Monotachi	Altron	Altron	Unreleased	Unreleased	April 25, 1997
Elf o Karu Monotachi II	Altron	Altron	Unreleased	Unreleased	July 16, 1998
Elf o Karu Monotachi: Hanafuda Hen	Altron	Altron	Unreleased	Unreleased	September 4, 1997
EMIT Vol. 1: Toki no Maigo	Koei	Koei	Unreleased	Unreleased	March 25, 1995
EMIT Vol. 2: Meigake no Tabi	Koei	Koei	Unreleased	Unreleased	April 1, 1995
EMIT Vol. 3: Watashi ni Sayonara o	Koei	Koei	Unreleased	Unreleased	April 1, 1995
Enemy Zero	Warp	Warp^{JP} Sega^{WW}	December 1, 1997	December 5, 1997	December 13, 1996
Eternal Melody	Starlight Marry	MediaWorks	Unreleased	Unreleased	October 4, 1996
Étude Prologue: Yureugoku Kokoro no Katachi	Takuyo	Takuyo	Unreleased	Unreleased	November 26, 1998
EVE Burst Error	C's Ware	Imagineer	Unreleased	Unreleased	January 24, 1997
EVE: The Lost One	C's Ware	Imadio	Unreleased	Unreleased	March 12, 1998
F1 Challenge	Bell Corporation	Sega^{JP/PAL} Virgin Interactive Entertainment^{NA}	September 9, 1996	February 1996	November 2, 1995
Falcom Classics	Nihon Falcom	JVC	Unreleased	Unreleased	November 6, 1997
Falcom Classics II	Nihon Falcom	JVC	Unreleased	Unreleased	October 29, 1998
Fantastep	Jaleco	Jaleco	Unreleased	Unreleased	April 25, 1997
Farland Saga	TGL	TGL	Unreleased	Unreleased	January 29, 1998
Farland Saga: Toki no Michishirube	TGL	TGL	Unreleased	Unreleased	December 17, 1998
Farland Story: Habou no Mai	TGL	TGL	Unreleased	Unreleased	March 28, 1997
Father Christmas	GAGA Communications	GAGA Communications	Unreleased	Unreleased	December 8, 1995
Feda Remake!: The Emblem of Justice	Max Entertainment	Yanoman	Unreleased	Unreleased	May 24, 1996
FIFA: Road to World Cup 98	Climax	EA Sports	December 18, 1997	December 26, 1997	Unreleased
FIFA Soccer 96	Probe Entertainment	EA Sports^{WW} Electronic Arts Victor^{JP}	December 1995	December 1995	March 15, 1996
FIFA Soccer 97	Perfect Entertainment	EA Sports	March 20, 1997	April 4, 1997	Unreleased
Fighter's History Dynamite	Rutubo Games	Sega	Unreleased	Unreleased	July 4, 1997
Fighters Megamix	Sega AM2	Sega	May 15, 1997	June 5, 1997	December 21, 1996
Fighting Vipers	Sega AM2	Sega	October 29, 1996	October 31, 1996	August 30, 1996
Final Fight Revenge	Capcom Digital Studios	Capcom	Unreleased	Unreleased	March 30, 2000
Find Love 2: Rhapsody	F Creative Factory; Lyceen	Daiki	Unreleased	Unreleased	November 26, 1998
Fire Pro Gaiden: Blazing Tornado	Human Entertainment	Human Entertainment	Unreleased	Unreleased	August 25, 1995
Fire Pro Wrestling S: 6 Men Scramble	Human Entertainment	Human Entertainment	Unreleased	Unreleased	December 27, 1996
Firestorm: Thunderhawk 2^{PAL} Thunderstrike 2^{NA} Thunderhawk 2^{JP}	Core Design	Core Design^{PAL} U.S. Gold^{NA} Victor Entertainment^{JP}	December 1995	December 4, 1995	February 23, 1996
Fishing Koushien	A Wave	King Records	Unreleased	Unreleased	March 15, 1996
Fishing Koushien II	A Wave	King Records	Unreleased	Unreleased	May 30, 1997
FIST	Genki	Imagineer	Unreleased	Unreleased	November 22, 1996
Formula Grand Prix Team Unei Simulation	Coconuts Japan	Coconuts Japan	Unreleased	Unreleased	November 13, 1997
Formula Karts Special Edition	Manic Media Productions	Sega	Unreleased	May 22, 1997	Unreleased
Frankenstein: Through the Eyes of the Monster	Alexandria; Tachyon Studios	Interplay Productions	Unreleased	1997	Unreleased
Frank Thomas Big Hurt Baseball	Iguana UK	Acclaim Entertainment	June 7, 1996	June 1996	August 2, 1996
Free Talk Studio: Mari no Kimama na O-Shaberi	Media Entertainment	Media Entertainment	Unreleased	Unreleased	May 9, 1997
Friends: Seishun no Kagayaki	Stack	NEC Interchannel	Unreleased	Unreleased	April 29, 1999
From TV Animation Slam Dunk: I Love Basketball	BEC	Bandai	Unreleased	Unreleased	August 11, 1995
Full Cowl Mini Yonku Super Factory	Nextech	MediaQuest	Unreleased	Unreleased	July 31, 1997
Funky Fantasy	Tose	Yoshimoto Kogyo	Unreleased	Unreleased	December 13, 1996
Funky Head Boxers	Yoshimoto Kogyo	Yoshimoto Kogyo	Unreleased	Unreleased	January 10, 1997
Funky Head Boxers Plus	Yoshimoto Kogyo	Yoshimoto Kogyo	Unreleased	Unreleased	May 2, 1997
Fushigi no Kuni no Angelique	Koei	Koei	Unreleased	Unreleased	February 28, 1997
Fuusei Sensei	Hakuhodo	Hakuhodo	Unreleased	Unreleased	November 15, 1996
G Vector	Soft Office	Soft Office	Unreleased	Unreleased	October 16, 1997
Gaia Breeder	Aspect	Aspect	Unreleased	Unreleased	November 27, 1997
Gakkō no Kaidan	Japan Media Programming	Sega	Unreleased	Unreleased	July 14, 1995
Gakkou no Kowai Uwasa Hanako-san ga Kita	Capcom	Capcom	Unreleased	Unreleased	August 11, 1995
Galaxy Fight	Santaclaus	Sunsoft	July 3, 1996	June 1996	November 22, 1995
Gale Racer	System Sacom	Sega	Unreleased	Unreleased	December 2, 1994
Gal Jan	Warashi	Warashi	Unreleased	Unreleased	August 9, 1996
Gals Panic SS	Mainichi Communications	Mainichi Communications	Unreleased	Unreleased	September 27, 1996
Gambler Jiko Chūshinha: Tokyo Mahjongland	Game Arts	Game Arts	Unreleased	Unreleased	October 18, 1996
Game de Seishun	KID	KID	Unreleased	Unreleased	April 23, 1998
Game Nihonshi: Kakumeiji Oda Nobunaga	Koei	Koei	Unreleased	Unreleased	April 4, 1997
Game no Tatsujin	Success; Chatnoir; Alpha-Beta; Itsui	Sunsoft	Unreleased	Unreleased	June 9, 1995
Game no Tatsujin 2	Success; Chatnoir; Alpha-Beta; Itsui; Oxford Softworks	Sunsoft	Unreleased	Unreleased	March 15, 1996
Game no Tetsujin: The Shanghai	Sunsoft	Sunsoft	Unreleased	Unreleased	October 13, 1995
Game Tengoku	Jaleco	Jaleco	Unreleased	Unreleased	June 6, 1997
Game-Ware	General Entertainment	General Entertainment	Unreleased	Unreleased	April 5, 1996
Game-Ware Vol. 2	General Entertainment	General Entertainment	Unreleased	Unreleased	July 5, 1996
Game-Ware Vol. 3	General Entertainment	General Entertainment	Unreleased	Unreleased	October 4, 1996
Game-Ware Vol. 4	General Entertainment	General Entertainment	Unreleased	Unreleased	March 7, 1997
Game-Ware Vol. 5	General Entertainment	General Entertainment	Unreleased	Unreleased	June 27, 1997
Garō Densetsu 3: Harukanaru Tatakai	SIMS	SNK	Unreleased	Unreleased	June 28, 1996
Gegege no Kitarō: Gentōkaikitan		Bandai	Unreleased	Unreleased	December 27, 1996
Gekiretsu Pachinkazu	Planning Office Wada	BMG Victor	Unreleased	Unreleased	August 2, 1996
Gekirindan Time Travel Shooting	Japan Media Programming	Virgin Interactive Entertainment	Unreleased	Unreleased	April 18, 1997
Gekitotsu Koushien	Magical Company	Magical Company	Unreleased	Unreleased	August 1, 1997
Gekka no Kishi: Ouryuusen	Banpresto	Banpresto	Unreleased	Unreleased	November 22, 1996
Gensō Suikoden	Konami Computer Entertainment Sapporo	Konami	Unreleased	Unreleased	September 17, 1998
Ginga Eiyū Densetsu	Micro Vision	Tokuma Shoten	Unreleased	Unreleased	November 29, 1996
Ginga Eiyū Densetsu Plus	Micro Vision	Tokuma Shoten	Unreleased	Unreleased	October 23, 1997
Ginga Ojōsama Densetsu Yuna 3 Lightning Angel	Red Company	Hudson Soft	Unreleased	Unreleased	December 4, 1997
Ginga Ojōsama Densetsu Yuna Remix	Red Company	Hudson Soft	Unreleased	Unreleased	December 27, 1996
Girl Doll Toy: Tamasî wo Kudasai	Uran	Xuse	Unreleased	Unreleased	December 23, 1998
Gex	Beam Software	Crystal Dynamics^{WW} BMG Victor^{JP}	December 18, 1995	April 5, 1996	March 29, 1996
Ghen War	Jumpin' Jack Software	Sega^{NA} Virgin Interactive Entertainment^{JP/PAL}	1995	June 28, 1996	April 26, 1996
Go III Professional Taikyoku Igo	Mainichi Communications	Mainichi Communications	Unreleased	Unreleased	August 1, 1997
Godzilla Rettoushinkan	Scarab	Sega	Unreleased	Unreleased	December 22, 1995
Goiken Muyou: Anarchy in the Nippon	KSS	KSS	Unreleased	Unreleased	October 2, 1997
Golden Axe: The Duel	Sega AM1	Sega	June 27, 1996	December 1995	September 29, 1995
Gokujō Parodius Da! Deluxe Pack^{JP} Parodius^{PAL}	Konami	Konami	Unreleased	November 1995	May 19, 1995
Gotha: Ismailia Seneki	Micronet	Sega	Unreleased	Unreleased	January 27, 1995
Gradius Deluxe Pack	Konami	Konami	Unreleased	Unreleased	March 29, 1996
Grandia	Game Arts	Entertainment Software Publishing	Unreleased	Unreleased	December 18, 1997
Grandia: Digital Museum	Game Arts	Entertainment Software Publishing	Unreleased	Unreleased	May 28, 1998
GranDread	C-Lab.; Bahamut	Banpresto	Unreleased	Unreleased	November 27, 1997
Grand Slam	Burst Studios	Virgin Interactive Entertainment	May 1997	Unreleased	Unreleased
Greatest Nine '96	Sega	Sega	Unreleased	Unreleased	July 19, 1996
Grid Runner^{WW} Grid Run^{PAL}	Radical Entertainment	Virgin Interactive Entertainment	November 20, 1996	November 1996	December 27, 1996
Groove on Fight: Gōketsuji Ichizoku 3	Atlus	Atlus	Unreleased	Unreleased	May 16, 1997
GT24	Jaleco	Jaleco	Unreleased	Unreleased	May 28, 1998
Guardian Force	Success	Success	Unreleased	Unreleased	August 6, 1998
Guardian Heroes	Treasure	Sega	April 24, 1996	June 20, 1996	January 26, 1996
Gunbird	Psikyo	Atlus	Unreleased	Unreleased	December 15, 1995
GunBlaze S	Active	KID	Unreleased	Unreleased	January 29, 1998
Gun Frontier Arcade Gears	Goo!	Xing Entertainment	Unreleased	Unreleased	September 25, 1997
Gungriffon	Game Arts	Game Arts^{JP} Sega^{WW}	June 19, 1996	July 1996	March 15, 1996
Gungriffon II	Game Arts	Game Arts	Unreleased	Unreleased	April 23, 1998
Gussun Oyoyo-S	Xing Entertainment	Xing Entertainment	Unreleased	Unreleased	March 29, 1996
Hanagumi Taisen Columns	Red Company; Sega CS2 R&D	Sega	Unreleased	Unreleased	March 28, 1997
Hang-On GP^{NA} Hang-On GP '95^{JP} Hang-On GP '96^{PAL}	Genki	Sega	January 1996	March 1996	October 27, 1995
Hankou Shashin: Shibarareta Shoujo-tachi no Mita Mono ha?	Imagineer	Imagineer	Unreleased	Unreleased	June 14, 1996
Hansha de Spark!	Prism	Sieg	Unreleased	Unreleased	December 23, 1997
Hardcore 4x4^{PAL} TNN Motorsports Hardcore 4x4^{NA} Deka Yonku: Tough The Truck^{JP}	Gremlin Interactive	Gremlin Interactive^{PAL} ASC Games^{NA} Human Entertainment^{JP}	December 20, 1996	December 1996	May 2, 1997
Harukaze Sentai V-Force	Ving	Ving	Unreleased	Unreleased	June 27, 1997
Hatsukoi Monogatari	Axes Art Amuse	Tokuma Shoten Intermedia	Unreleased	Unreleased	October 1, 1998
HatTrick Hero S	Taito	Taito	Unreleased	Unreleased	December 8, 1995
Haunted Casino	Societa Daikanyama	Societa Daikanyama	Unreleased	Unreleased	September 27, 1996
Heartbeat Scramble	Japan Media Programming; TamTam	Imagineer	Unreleased	Unreleased	September 6, 1996
Hebereke's Popoitto	Success	Sunsoft	Unreleased	December 1995	March 3, 1995
Heir of Zendor: The Legend and The Land^{NA} Gotha II: Tenkū no Kishi^{JP}	Micronet	Koei	December 12, 1996	Unreleased	March 1, 1996
Heisei Tensai Bakabon Susume! Bakabons	General Entertainment	General Entertainment	Unreleased	Unreleased	July 7, 1995
Heiwa Pachinko Soushingeki	Naxat Soft	Naxat Soft	Unreleased	Unreleased	October 4, 1996
Herc's Adventures	Big Ape Productions; LucasArts	LucasArts	July 14, 1997	Unreleased	Unreleased
Hexen	Probe Entertainment	id Software^{WW} SoftBank Corp.^{JP}	March 31, 1997	March 21, 1997	March 26, 1998
Hi-Octane	Bullfrog Productions	Electronic Arts^{WW} Electronic Arts Victor^{JP}	1995	December 1995	March 22, 1996
High Velocity: Mountain Racing Challenge^{NA} Touge King: The Spirits^{JP}	Cave	Atlus	November 1995	Unreleased	November 10, 1995
Highway 2000^{WW} Wangan Dead Heat^{JP}	Genki	Pack-In-Video^{JP} JVC Musical Industries^{PAL} Natsume Inc.^{NA}	November 21, 1996	September 1996	December 15, 1995
High School Terra Story	Success	KID	Unreleased	Unreleased	July 23, 1998
Himitsu Sentai Metamor V	Feycraft	Mainichi Communications	Unreleased	Unreleased	April 23, 1998
Hissatsu!	KID	Emotion Digital Software	Unreleased	Unreleased	June 28, 1996
Hissatsu Pachinko Collection	Success	Sunsoft	Unreleased	Unreleased	January 19, 1996
Hiyake no Omoide & Himekuri: Girls in Motion Puzzle Vol. 1	Japan Media Programming	Yanoman	Unreleased	Unreleased	December 8, 1995
Hokuto no Ken	Banpresto	Banpresto	Unreleased	Unreleased	December 22, 1995
Honkaku 4-nin Uchi Geinoujin Taikyoku Mahjong: The Wareme DE Pon	Video System	Video System	Unreleased	Unreleased	October 10, 1996
Honkaku Hanafuda	Altron	Altron	Unreleased	Unreleased	October 29, 1998
Honkaku Pro Mahjong Tetsuman Special	Chatnoir	Naxat Soft	Unreleased	Unreleased	August 23, 1996
Honkaku Shōgi Shinan Wakamatsu Shōgi Juku	SIMS; Japan System House	SIMS	Unreleased	Unreleased	January 29, 1998
Hop Step Idol	Media Entertainment	Media Entertainment	Unreleased	Unreleased	December 4, 1997
The Horde	Silicon Knights	BMG Victor^{JP} Crystal Dynamics^{WW}	1996	May 1996	March 8, 1996
Horror Tour	Goo!	OCC	Unreleased	Unreleased	March 29, 1996
Hōkago Renai Club: Koi no Étude	Libido	KID	Unreleased	Unreleased	January 15, 1998
Houma Hunter Lime Perfect Collection	Silence	Asmik	Unreleased	Unreleased	September 29, 1995
The House of the Dead	Tantalus Interactive	Sega	May 5, 1998	April 10, 1998	March 26, 1998
Hyper 3-D Pinball^{NA/JP} Tilt!^{EU}	NMS Software	Virgin Interactive Entertainment	November 20, 1996	September 6, 1996	January 17, 1997
Hyper 3D Taisen Battle Gebockers	Riverhillsoft	Riverhillsoft	Unreleased	Unreleased	February 23, 1996
Hyper Duel	Technosoft	Technosoft	Unreleased	Unreleased	November 22, 1996
Hyper Reverthion	Technosoft	Technosoft	Unreleased	Unreleased	June 7, 1996
Hyper Securities S	Victor Interactive Software	Pack-In-Video	Unreleased	Unreleased	February 7, 1997
Ide Yosuke Meijin no Shin Jissen Mahjong	Capcom	Capcom	Unreleased	Unreleased	June 28, 1996
Idol Janshi Suchie-Pai II	Jaleco	Jaleco	Unreleased	Unreleased	April 26, 1996
Idol Janshi Suchie-Pai Mecha Genteiban: Hatsubai 5 Shūnen (Toku) Package	Jaleco	Jaleco	Unreleased	Unreleased	November 26, 1998
Idol Janshi Suchie-Pai Remix	Jaleco	Jaleco	Unreleased	Unreleased	September 29, 1995
Idol Janshi Suchie-Pai Special	Jaleco	Jaleco	Unreleased	Unreleased	February 24, 1995
Idol Mahjong Final Romance 2	Video System	ASK Kodansha	Unreleased	Unreleased	August 11, 1995
Idol Mahjong Final Romance 4	Video System	Video System	Unreleased	Unreleased	May 21, 1998
Idol Mahjong Final Romance R	Video System	ASK Kodansha	Unreleased	Unreleased	March 15, 1996
Image Fight & X Multiply Arcade Gears	Xing Entertainment	Xing Entertainment	Unreleased	Unreleased	August 20, 1998
Impact Racing	Funcom Dublin	JVC Musical Industries^{PAL} Acclaim Entertainment^{NA} Coconuts Japan^{JP}	1996	July 5, 1996	June 6, 1997
In the Hunt	SIMS	Imagineer^{JP} Kokopeli Digital Studios^{WW}	June 4, 1996	June 1996	December 15, 1995
Initial D: Kôdô Saisoku Densetsu	Genki	Kodansha	Unreleased	Unreleased	June 25, 1998
The Incredible Hulk: The Pantheon Saga	Attention to Detail	Eidos Interactive	April 10, 1997	1997	Unreleased
Independence Day	Radical Entertainment	Fox Interactive	March 11, 1997	June 13, 1997	Unreleased
Ippatsu Gyakuten: Gambling King he no Michi	Planning Office Wada	BMG Victor	Unreleased	Unreleased	July 5, 1996
Irem Arcade Classics	Irem	I'MAX	Unreleased	Unreleased	April 26, 1996
Iron Man and X-O Manowar in Heavy Metal	Realtime Associates	Acclaim Entertainment	November 14, 1996	1996	November 22, 1996
Iron Storm^{NA} World Advanced Daisenryaku: Kōtetsu no Senpū^{JP}	Sega	Sega^{JP} Working Designs^{NA}	May 8, 1996	Unreleased	September 22, 1995
Ishin no Arashi	Koei	Koei	Unreleased	Unreleased	September 25, 1997
J.B. Harold: Blue Chicago Blues	Riverhillsoft	Riverhillsoft	Unreleased	Unreleased	September 22, 1995
J. League Go Go Goal!	Tecmo	Tecmo	Unreleased	Unreleased	May 30, 1997
J. League Jikkyou Honoo no Striker	Konami Computer Entertainment Sapporo	Konami	Unreleased	Unreleased	February 26, 1998
J. League Victory Goal '97	Sega	Sega	Unreleased	Unreleased	March 14, 1997
J.League Pro Soccer Club o Tsukurou!	Sega	Sega	Unreleased	Unreleased	February 23, 1996
J.League Pro Soccer Club o Tsukurou! 2	Sega	Sega	Unreleased	Unreleased	November 20, 1997
Jantei Battle Cos-Player	Daiki	Daiki	Unreleased	Unreleased	April 18, 1997
Japan Super Bass Classic '96	Naxat Soft	Naxat Soft	Unreleased	Unreleased	August 23, 1996
Jewels of the Oracle	ELOI Productions	Sunsoft	Unreleased	December 1996	October 18, 1996
Jikkyō Oshaberi Parodius: Forever With Me	Konami	Konami	Unreleased	Unreleased	December 13, 1996
Jikkyō Powerful Pro Yakyū '95 Kaimaku-ban	Diamond Head	Konami	Unreleased	Unreleased	July 28, 1995
Jikkyō Powerful Pro Yakyū S	Konami Computer Entertainment Yokohama	Konami	Unreleased	Unreleased	December 4, 1997
Jikū Tantei DD: Maboroshi no Rōrerai	System Sacom	ASCII	Unreleased	Unreleased	July 26, 1996
Jinzou Ningen Hakaider: Last Judgement	Japan Media Programming	Sega	Unreleased	Unreleased	December 27, 1996
Jissen Mahjong	Outback	Imagineer	Unreleased	Unreleased	September 1, 1995
Jissen Pachinko Hisshouhou! Twin	Sammy	Sammy	Unreleased	Unreleased	March 28, 1997
Jissen Pachinko Hisshouhou! 3	Sammy	Sammy	Unreleased	Unreleased	May 24, 1996
Jissen Pachinko Hisshouhou! 4	Sammy	Sammy	Unreleased	Unreleased	March 15, 1997
Jissen! Pachi-Slot Hisshouhou! Iron Hook	Sammy	Sammy	Unreleased	Unreleased	1996
Johnny Bazookatone	Arc Developments	U.S. Gold^{WW} Soft Vision^{JP}	February 1996	February 1996	April 26, 1996
Jonah Lomu Rugby	Rage Software	Codemasters	Unreleased	September 1997	Unreleased
Joshikousei no Houkago... Pukunpa	Athena	Athena	Unreleased	Unreleased	September 27, 1996
Jun Classic C.C. & Rope Club	T&E Soft	T&E Soft	Unreleased	Unreleased	December 18, 1997
Jungle Park: Saturn Shima	Saru Brunei	BMG Japan	Unreleased	Unreleased	January 15, 1998
Jung Rhythm	Altron	Altron	Unreleased	Unreleased	January 15, 1998
K-1 Fighting Illusion Shou	Daft	Xing Entertainment	Unreleased	Unreleased	January 31, 1997
Kaitō Saint Tail	Access	Tomy	Unreleased	Unreleased	July 25, 1997
Kakinoki Shōgi	ASCII	ASCII	Unreleased	Unreleased	April 14, 1995
Kakyūsei	ELF	ELF	Unreleased	Unreleased	April 25, 1997
Kanazawa Shōgi	SETA	SETA	Unreleased	Unreleased	November 24, 1995
Kanzen Chūkei Pro Yakyū Greatest Nine	Sega	Sega	Unreleased	Unreleased	May 26, 1995
Kekkon Marriage	Westone	Shogakukan Production	Unreleased	Unreleased	December 15, 1995
Keio Flying Squadron 2	Victor Entertainment	Victor Entertainment^{JP} JVC Musical Industries^{PAL}	Unreleased	September 1996	May 17, 1996
Keriotosse!	Unlimited	Masudaya	Unreleased	Unreleased	June 18, 1998
Kidō Senkan Nadesico: The Blank of 3 Years	Scarab	Sega	Unreleased	Unreleased	September 23, 1998
Kidō Senkan Nadesico: Yappari Saigo ha 'Ai ga Katsu'?	Sega	Sega	Unreleased	Unreleased	May 2, 1997
Kidō Senshi Gundam	CRI	Bandai	Unreleased	Unreleased	December 22, 1995
Kidō Senshi Gundam Gaiden I: Senritsu no Blue	BEC; Studio Orphee	Bandai	Unreleased	Unreleased	September 20, 1996
Kidō Senshi Gundam Gaiden II: Ao wo Uketsugu Mono	BEC; Studio Orphee	Bandai	Unreleased	Unreleased	December 6, 1996
Kidō Senshi Gundam Gaiden III: Sabakareshi Mono	BEC; Studio Orphee	Bandai	Unreleased	Unreleased	March 7, 1997
Kidō Senshi Gundam: Gihren no Yabō	CRI	Bandai	Unreleased	Unreleased	April 9, 1998
Kidō Senshi Z Gundam: Kouhen Sora wo Kakeru		Bandai	Unreleased	Unreleased	September 25, 1997
Kidō Senshi Z Gundam: Zenpen Zeta no Kodou		Bandai	Unreleased	Unreleased	April 25, 1997
Kindaichi Shounen no Jikenbo: Hoshimitou Kanashimi no Fukushuuki	Metro	Hudson Soft	Unreleased	Unreleased	January 15, 1998
The King of Fighters '95	Rutubo Games	SNK	Unreleased	July 4, 1997	March 28, 1996
The King of Fighters '96	Yumekobo	SNK	Unreleased	Unreleased	December 31, 1996
The King of Fighters '97	Yumekobo	SNK	Unreleased	Unreleased	March 26, 1998
Kiss yori...	KID	KID	Unreleased	Unreleased	March 18, 1999
Kochira Katsushika-ku Kameari Kōen Mae Hashutsujo: Nakagawa Land Dai-race! no Maki	Warashi	Bandai	Unreleased	Unreleased	August 29, 1997
Koden Koureijutsu Hyaku Monogatari: Hontoni Atta Kowai Hanashi	Hudson Soft	Hudson Soft	Unreleased	Unreleased	August 8, 1997
Koi no Summer Fantasy: in Miyazaki Seagaia	Japan System Supply	Emotion Digital Software	Unreleased	Unreleased	August 22, 1997
Konami Antiques MSX Collection Ultra Pack	Konami Computer Entertainment Yokohama	Konami	Unreleased	Unreleased	July 23, 1998
Kouryuu Sangoku Engi	RON	Xing Entertainment	Unreleased	Unreleased	December 6, 1996
Krazy Ivan	Perfect Entertainment	Psygnosis^{EU} SoftBank Corp.^{JP}	Unreleased	December 1996	June 27, 1997
Kumitate Battle Kuttu Ketto	Technosoft	Technosoft	Unreleased	Unreleased	April 2, 1998
Kunoichi Torimonochō	PoleStar	CRI	Unreleased	Unreleased	February 5, 1998
Kuro no Danshou: The Literary Fragment	Abogado Powers	Oz Club	Unreleased	Unreleased	August 8, 1997
Kurubushi Kyodai Gekijo Daiikkan Mah-jong Hen	Chatnoir	Yumedia	Unreleased	Unreleased	June 28, 1996
Kururin Pa!	Sky Think System	Sky Think System	Unreleased	Unreleased	February 23, 1996
Kūsō Kagaku Sekai Gulliver Boy	Hudson Soft	Hudson Soft	Unreleased	Unreleased	March 22, 1996
Kyūkyoku Tiger II Plus	Naxat Soft	Naxat Soft	Unreleased	Unreleased	December 18, 1997
Kyuutenkai	Technosoft	Technosoft	Unreleased	Unreleased	August 25, 1995
Langrisser III	Career Soft	Masaya	Unreleased	Unreleased	October 18, 1996
Langrisser IV	Career Soft	Masaya	Unreleased	Unreleased	August 1, 1997
Langrisser V: The End of Legend	Career Soft	Masaya	Unreleased	Unreleased	June 18, 1998
Langrisser: Dramatic Edition	Career Soft	Masaya	Unreleased	Unreleased	February 26, 1998
Last Bronx	Sega AM3	Sega	October 20, 1997	October 23, 1997	August 1, 1997
Layer Section^{JP} Galactic Attack^{WW}	Taito	Taito^{JP} Acclaim Entertainment^{WW}	December 1995	February 1996	September 14, 1995
Layer Section II	Tose	MediaQuest	Unreleased	Unreleased	October 30, 1997
The Legend of Heroes I & The Legend of Heroes II Eiyû Densetu	Highwaystar	GMF	Unreleased	Unreleased	September 23, 1998
The Legend of Oasis^{NA} The Story of Thor 2^{PAL} Thor: Seireioukiden^{JP}	Ancient	Sega	July 31, 1996	September 19, 1996	April 26, 1996
Lifescape 2 Body Bionics: Kyoui no Shouuchuu Jintai	Scitron & Art	MediaQuest	Unreleased	Unreleased	August 8, 1997
LifeScape: Seimei 40 Okunen Haruka na Tabi	Scitron & Art	MediaQuest	Unreleased	Unreleased	May 24, 1996
Linda³: Kanzenban	Alfa System; Mars	ASCII	Unreleased	Unreleased	June 18, 1998
Linkle Liver Story	Nextech	Sega	Unreleased	Unreleased	March 15, 1996
Loaded^{WW} Blood Factory^{JP}	Gremlin Interactive	Gremlin Interactive^{PAL} Interplay Productions^{WW}	October 25, 1996	July 1996	November 29, 1996
Lode Runner Extra	Game Arts	Patra	Unreleased	Unreleased	January 10, 1997
Lode Runner: The Legend Returns	Game Arts	Patra	Unreleased	Unreleased	March 8, 1996
Logic Puzzle Rainbow Town	Human Entertainment	Human Entertainment	Unreleased	Unreleased	February 23, 1996
The Lost World: Jurassic Park	Appaloosa Interactive	Sega	September 23, 1997	November 6, 1997	October 23, 1997
Lovely Pop 2 in 1 Jan Jan Koi Shimasho	Visco	Visco	Unreleased	Unreleased	July 30, 1998
Lunacy^{NA} Gekka Mugentan Torico^{JP} Torico^{PAL}	System Sacom	Sega^{JP/PAL} Atlus^{NA}	March 26, 1997	March 27, 1997	June 28, 1996
Lunar Silver Star Story	Game Arts; Japan Art Media	Kadokawa Shoten	Unreleased	Unreleased	October 25, 1996
Lunar Silver Star Story MPEG-ban	Game Arts; Japan Art Media	Kadokawa Shoten	Unreleased	Unreleased	July 4, 1997
Lunar 2: Eternal Blue	Game Arts	Kadokawa Shoten	Unreleased	Unreleased	July 23, 1998
Lupin the 3rd: Pyramid no Kenja	Vantan International	Asmik	Unreleased	Unreleased	August 6, 1998
M: Kimi o Tsutaete	Nexus Interact	DaZZ	Unreleased	Unreleased	December 20, 1996
Maboroshi no Black Bass	Make Software	Make Software	Unreleased	Unreleased	March 28, 1997
Machi	Chunsoft	Chunsoft	Unreleased	Unreleased	January 22, 1998
Madden NFL 97	Tiburon Entertainment	EA Sports	September 26, 1996	October 16, 1996	Unreleased
Madden NFL 98	Tiburon Entertainment	EA Sports	August 26, 1997	October 1997	Unreleased
Madō Monogatari	Compile	Compile	Unreleased	Unreleased	July 23, 1998
Magic Carpet	Krisalis Software	Electronic Arts^{WW} Electronic Arts Victor^{JP}	March 1996	March 29, 1996	December 6, 1996
Magic Knight Rayearth	Sega	Sega^{JP} Working Designs^{NA}	December 11, 1998	Unreleased	August 25, 1995
Magical Drop	Data East	Data East	Unreleased	Unreleased	December 15, 1995
Magical Drop II	Data East	Sega	Unreleased	Unreleased	September 27, 1996
Magical Drop III Toretate Zōkangō!	Data East	Data East	Unreleased	Unreleased	June 20, 1997
Mahjong Doukyuusei Special	Make Software	Make Software	Unreleased	Unreleased	March 29, 1996
Mahjong Gakuensai	Make Software	Make Software	Unreleased	Unreleased	November 6, 1997
Mahjong Gakuensai DX: Zenjitsu ni Matsuwaru Funsenki	Make Software	Make Software	Unreleased	Unreleased	September 23, 1998
Mahjong Ganryuujima	ASCII	ASCII	Unreleased	Unreleased	March 10, 1995
Mahjong Gokuu Tenjiku	Chatnoir	Electronic Arts Victor	Unreleased	Unreleased	November 22, 1994
Mahjong Hyper Reaction R	Sammy	Sammy	Unreleased	Unreleased	March 8, 1996
Mahjong Kaigan Monogatari: Mahjong Kyou Jidai Sexy Idol Hen	Micronet	Micronet	Unreleased	Unreleased	August 4, 1995
Mahjong Kyou Jidai: Cebu Island '96	Micronet	Micronet	Unreleased	Unreleased	July 19, 1996
Mahjong Kyou Jidai: Cogal Houkago Hen	Micronet	Micronet	Unreleased	Unreleased	January 12, 1996
Mahjong Taikai II Special	Koei	Koei	Unreleased	Unreleased	October 4, 1996
Mahjong Tenshi Angel Lips	Nihon System	Nihon System	Unreleased	Unreleased	March 29, 1996
Mahjong Yon-Shimai: Wakakusa Monogatari	Maboroshi Ware	Naxat Soft	Unreleased	Unreleased	September 27, 1996
Mahō Gakuen Lunar!	Game Arts; Studio Alex	Kadokawa Shoten / Entertainment Software Publishing	Unreleased	Unreleased	November 20, 1997
Mahou no Jansi Poe Poe Poemy	Imagineer	Imagineer	Unreleased	Unreleased	September 29, 1995
Mahō Shōjo Pretty Samy: Heart no Kimochi	NEC Interchannel	NEC Interchannel	Unreleased	Unreleased	January 29, 1998
Mahou Shoujo Pretty Samy: Osorubeshi Shintaisokutei! Kakubakuhatsu 5 Byou Mae!!	NEC Interchannel	NEC Interchannel	Unreleased	Unreleased	August 8, 1997
Mahôtukai ni naru Hôhô	TGL	TGL	Unreleased	Unreleased	August 27, 1998
Mainichi Kawaru Quiz Bangumi Quiz 365	Oz Club	Oz Club	Unreleased	Unreleased	March 15, 1996
The Mansion of Hidden Souls	System Sacom	Sega	December 1995	November 1995	December 2, 1994
Manx TT Super Bike	Tantalus Interactive	Sega	July 29, 1997	March 20, 1997	March 14, 1997
Maria: Kimitachi ga Umareta Wake	Break	Axela	Unreleased	Unreleased	December 11, 1997
Marica: Shinjitsu no Sekai	Feycraft	Victor Interactive Software	Unreleased	Unreleased	June 20, 1997
Marie no Atelier Ver. 1.3: Salburg no Renkinjutsushi	Goo!	Imadio	Unreleased	Unreleased	December 11, 1997
Mario Mushano no Chou Shōgi Juku	King Records	King Records	Unreleased	Unreleased	January 15, 1998
Marvel Super Heroes	Capcom	Capcom^{JP/NA} Virgin Interactive Entertainment^{PAL}	October 2, 1997	January 24, 1998	August 8, 1997
Marvel Super Heroes vs. Street Fighter	Capcom	Capcom	Unreleased	Unreleased	October 22, 1998
Mass Destruction	NMS Software	BMG Interactive^{PAL} ASC Games^{NA} BMG Japan^{JP}	November 14, 1997	March 27, 1997	November 20, 1997
Masters Harukanaru Augusta 3	T&E Soft	T&E Soft	Unreleased	Unreleased	September 22, 1995
Master of Monsters: Neo Generations	SystemSoft	Toshiba EMI	Unreleased	Unreleased	October 25, 1996
Matsukata Hiroki no World Fishing	Tose	MediaQuest	Unreleased	Unreleased	February 2, 1996
Maximum Force	Tantalus Interactive	Midway^{NA} GT Interactive^{PAL}	October 13, 1997	March 1998	Unreleased
MechWarrior 2: Arcade Combat Edition	Quantum Factory	Activision^{WW} Emotion Digital Software^{JP}	April 4, 1997	May 1997	September 25, 1997
Mega Man 8	Capcom	Capcom	March 25, 1997	Unreleased	January 17, 1997
Mega Man X3	Capcom	Capcom^{JP} Virgin Interactive Entertainment^{PAL}	Unreleased	March 1997	April 26, 1996
Mega Man X4	Capcom	Capcom	October 1, 1997	Unreleased	August 1, 1997
MeltyLancer: Ginga Shoujo Keisatsu 2086	Tenky; ALU	Imagineer	Unreleased	Unreleased	December 13, 1996
MeltyLancer Re-inforce	Nextech	Imadio	Unreleased	Unreleased	May 21, 1998
Metal Black	Ving	Ving	Unreleased	Unreleased	May 24, 1996
Metal Fighter Miku	Feycraft	Victor Entertainment	Unreleased	Unreleased	September 29, 1995
Metal Slug	SNK	SNK	Unreleased	Unreleased	April 4, 1997
Mezase Idol Star!! Natsuiro Memories: Mahjong Hen	Shar Rock	Shar Rock	Unreleased	Unreleased	September 27, 1996
Mighty Hits	Altron	Altron^{JP} Sega^{EU}	Unreleased	December 1996	October 18, 1996
Minakata Hakudou Toujou	Thinking Rabbit	Atlus	Unreleased	Unreleased	August 7, 1997
Minami no Shima ni Buta ga Ita: Lucas no Daibouken	Scholar	Scholar / Virgin Interactive Entertainment	Unreleased	Unreleased	October 10, 1996
Minnesota Fats: Pool Legend^{NA} Side Pocket 2: Densetsu no Hustler^{JP}	Data East	Data East	1995	Unreleased	March 31, 1995
Minton Keibu no Sousa File: Doukeshi Satsujin Jiken	Thinking Rabbit; O-TWO inc.	Riverhillsoft	Unreleased	Unreleased	October 30, 1997
Mizubaku Daibōken	Ving	Ving	Unreleased	Unreleased	October 22, 1998
Mizuki Sigeru no Yôkai Zukan Sôsyûhen	Highwaystar	Kodansha	Unreleased	Unreleased	June 25, 1998
Momotarou Douchuuki	Hudson Soft	Hudson Soft	Unreleased	Unreleased	September 25, 1997
Monster Slider	DATT Japan	DATT Japan	Unreleased	Unreleased	March 28, 1997
Moon Cradle	Tose	Pack-In-Video	Unreleased	Unreleased	June 27, 1997
Mortal Kombat II	Probe Entertainment	Acclaim Entertainment	January 23, 1996	February 9, 1996	March 29, 1996
Mortal Kombat Trilogy	Point of View	Midway^{NA} GT Interactive^{PAL}	August 8, 1997	November 14, 1997	Unreleased
Motteke Tamago with Ganbare! Kamonohashi	Naxat Soft	Naxat Soft	Unreleased	Unreleased	July 2, 1998
Mouri Motonari: Chikai no Sanshi	Koei	Koei	Unreleased	Unreleased	October 2, 1997
Mr. Bones	Zono	Sega	October 18, 1996	March 13, 1997	June 27, 1997
Mujintō Monogatari R: Futari no Love Love Island	KSS	KSS	Unreleased	Unreleased	May 28, 1998
Murakosi Seikai no Bakutyô Nihon Rettô	A Wave	Victor Interactive Software	Unreleased	Unreleased	June 18, 1998
My Best Friends: St. Andrew Jogakuen Hen	ISCO	Atlus	Unreleased	Unreleased	March 22, 1996
My Dream: On Air ga Matenakute	Nihon Create	Nihon Create	Unreleased	Unreleased	September 18, 1997
My Fair Lady: Virtual Mahjong II	Micronet	Micronet	Unreleased	Unreleased	December 10, 1998
Myst	Sunsoft	Sunsoft^{JP/EU} Acclaim Entertainment^{NA}	September 1995	September 1995	November 22, 1994
Mystaria: The Realms of Lore^{WW} Riglord Saga^{JP}	Sega; Microcabin	Sega	December 27, 1995	January 26, 1996	July 21, 1995
Nanatsu Kaze no Shima Monogatari	Givro	Enix	Unreleased	Unreleased	November 27, 1997
Nanatsu no Hikan	Koei	Koei	Unreleased	Unreleased	April 5, 1996
NASCAR 98	High Score Entertainment	EA Sports	December 5, 1997	1997	Unreleased
NBA Action	Gray Matter	Sega	June 5, 1996	September 12, 1996	Unreleased
NBA Action 98	Visual Concepts	Sega	October 28, 1997	November 1997	Unreleased
NBA Jam Extreme	Sculptured Software	Acclaim Entertainment	November 26, 1996	December 6, 1996	February 28, 1997
NBA Jam Tournament Edition	Iguana UK	Acclaim Entertainment	November 10, 1995	December 1995	December 1, 1995
NBA Live 97	Realtime Associates	EA Sports	March 28, 1997	April 4, 1997	Unreleased
NBA Live 98	Realtime Associates	EA Sports	December 17, 1997	1997	Unreleased
The Need for Speed^{WW} Over Drivin' GT-R^{JP}	Pioneer Productions	Electronic Arts^{WW} Electronic Arts Victor^{JP}	June 26, 1996	July 5, 1996	December 20, 1996
Nekketsu Oyako	Technosoft	Technosoft	Unreleased	Unreleased	July 21, 1995
Next King: Koi no Sennen Oukoku	Alfa System; Plex; Mars	Bandai	Unreleased	Unreleased	November 20, 1997
NFL '97	GameTek	Sega	November 20, 1996	Unreleased	Unreleased
NFL Quarterback Club '96	Iguana Entertainment	Acclaim Entertainment	October 27, 1995	April 19, 1996	March 29, 1996
NFL Quarterback Club '97	Iguana Entertainment	Acclaim Entertainment	August 29, 1996	August 1996	November 22, 1996
NHL 97	Visual Concepts	EA Sports^{WW} Electronic Arts Victor^{JP}	December 4, 1996	December 6, 1996	July 11, 1997
NHL 98	MBL Research	EA Sports	January 16, 1998	January 23, 1998	Unreleased
NHL All-Star Hockey	Gray Matter	Sega	1995	November 1995	Unreleased
NHL All-Star Hockey 98	Radical Entertainment	Sega	November 24, 1997	January 1998	Unreleased
NHL Powerplay '96	Radical Entertainment	Virgin Interactive Entertainment	July 2, 1996	May 1997	February 7, 1997
Night Striker S	Fill-in-Cafe	Ving	Unreleased	Unreleased	June 14, 1996
Night Warriors: Darkstalkers' Revenge^{WW} Vampire Hunter: Darkstalkers' Revenge^{JP}	Capcom	Capcom^{JP/NA} Virgin Interactive Entertainment^{PAL}	March 29, 1996	November 1996	February 23, 1996
Nightruth: Futatsu Dake no Shinjitsu	Sonnet Computer Entertainment	Lay-Up	Unreleased	Unreleased	July 25, 1997
Nightruth: Maria	Sonnet Computer Entertainment	Sonnet Computer Entertainment	Unreleased	Unreleased	December 20, 1996
Nightruth #01: Yami no Tobira	Sonnet Computer Entertainment	Sonnet Computer Entertainment	Unreleased	Unreleased	August 9, 1996
Nights into Dreams	Sonic Team	Sega	August 20, 1996	September 5, 1996	July 5, 1996
Nihon Pro Mahjong Renmei Kounin Doujou Yaburi	Chatnoir	Naxat Soft	Unreleased	Unreleased	May 30, 1997
Nile Gawa no Yoake	Victor Interactive Software	Pack-In-Video	Unreleased	Unreleased	March 5, 1998
Ninja Jajamaru-kun: Onigiri Ninpouchou Gold	Atelier Double	Jaleco	Unreleased	Unreleased	October 9, 1997
Ninku: Tsuyokina Yatsura no Daigekitotsu!	SIMS	Sega	Unreleased	Unreleased	February 2, 1996
Ninpen Manmaru	TamTam	Enix	Unreleased	Unreleased	December 18, 1997
Nippon Daihyô Team no Kantoku ni Narô! Sekaihatu Soccer RPG	Enix; Sega; Tose	Enix	Unreleased	Unreleased	June 25, 1998
Nobunaga no Yabō Returns	Koei	Koei	Unreleased	Unreleased	March 29, 1996
Nobunaga no Yabō: Sengoku Gun'yūden	Koei	Koei	Unreleased	Unreleased	April 9, 1998
Nobunaga no Yabō Shōseiroku	Koei	Koei	Unreleased	Unreleased	April 2, 1998
Nobunaga no Yabō: Tenshōki	Koei	Koei	Unreleased	Unreleased	September 29, 1995
Nobunaga no Yabō: Tenshōki with Power-Up Kit	Koei	Koei	Unreleased	Unreleased	September 11, 1997
Noël 3	Pioneer LDC	Pioneer LDC	Unreleased	Unreleased	December 10, 1998
Nonomura Byōin no Hitobito	Silky's	ELF	Unreleased	Unreleased	April 26, 1996
Noon	Microcabin	Microcabin	Unreleased	Unreleased	January 29, 1998
Norse by Norse West: The Return of The Lost Vikings^{NA} The Lost Vikings 2: Norse by Norsewest^{PAL}	Beam Software	Interplay Productions	April 14, 1997	May 26, 1997	Unreleased
O-Chan no Oekaki Logic	Sunsoft	Sunsoft	Unreleased	Unreleased	November 17, 1995
Ochige Designer Tsukutte pon!	Ninelives; Quest Corporation	Pack-In-Video	Unreleased	Unreleased	November 20, 1997
Off-World Interceptor Extreme	Crystal Dynamics	Crystal Dynamics^{WW} BMG Victor^{JP}	October 1995	November 1995	November 22, 1995
Ojousama Tokkyuu	MediaWorks	MediaWorks	Unreleased	Unreleased	July 30, 1998
Ojousama wo Nerae!!	ScooP	Crystal Vision	Unreleased	Unreleased	July 23, 1998
Olympic Soccer	Silicon Dreams	U.S. Gold^{WW} Coconuts Japan^{JP}	August 6, 1996	August 1996	August 30, 1996
Omakase! Savers	Japan Media Programming	Sega	Unreleased	Unreleased	February 23, 1996
OoEdo Renaissance	Bits Laboratory	Pack-In-Video	Unreleased	Unreleased	December 18, 1997
Ōsama Game	Societa Daikanyama	Societa Daikanyama	Unreleased	Unreleased	May 28, 1998
Pachinko Hall Shinsou Daikaiten	Nexton	Nexton	Unreleased	Unreleased	February 26, 1998
Pachi-Slot Kanzen Kouryaku Uni-Colle'97	Nihon Syscom	Nihon Syscom	Unreleased	Unreleased	September 18, 1997
P.T.O.: Pacific Theater of Operations II^{NA} Teitoku no Ketsudan II^{JP}	Koei	Koei	November 20, 1996	Unreleased	February 23, 1996
Pandemonium!^{WW} Magical Hoppers^{JP}	Toys for Bob	Crystal Dynamics^{WW} Bandai^{JP}	April 24, 1997	June 12, 1997	April 25, 1997
Paneltia Story: Karen no Daibouken	Tamtam	Shōeisha	Unreleased	Unreleased	February 28, 1997
Panic-chan	Imagineer	Imagineer	Unreleased	Unreleased	August 8, 1997
Panzer Dragoon	Team Andromeda	Sega	May 11, 1995	August 30, 1995	March 10, 1995
Panzer Dragoon II Zwei	Team Andromeda	Sega	April 17, 1996	May 10, 1996	March 22, 1996
Panzer Dragoon Saga	Team Andromeda	Sega	May 5, 1998	April 17, 1998	January 29, 1998
Pappara Paoon	Ecole Software	Ecole Software	Unreleased	Unreleased	November 22, 1995
Pastel Muses	Soft Office	Soft Office	Unreleased	Unreleased	October 23, 1997
PD Ultraman Link	SIMS	Bandai	Unreleased	Unreleased	February 9, 1996
Pebble Beach Golf Links	T&E Soft	Sega	May 11, 1995	August 1995	February 24, 1995
PGA Tour 97	EA Sports	EA Sports^{WW} Electronic Arts Victor^{JP}	November 25, 1996	December 6, 1996	June 20, 1997
Phantasm	Infini Entertainment Technology	Outrigger	Unreleased	Unreleased	August 8, 1997
Photo Genic	Fill-in-Cafe; Zero System	Sunsoft	Unreleased	Unreleased	January 29, 1998
Pia Carrot e Yôkoso!!	KID	KID	Unreleased	Unreleased	March 12, 1998
Pia Carrot e Yôkoso!! 2	Cocktail Soft	NEC Interchannel	Unreleased	Unreleased	October 8, 1998
Pinball Graffiti	Bell	Pack-In-Video^{JP} JVC Musical Industries^{PAL}	Unreleased	1997	July 12, 1996
Planet Joker	IMP	Naxat Soft	Unreleased	Unreleased	March 7, 1997
Pocket Fighter	Capcom	Capcom	Unreleased	Unreleased	July 9, 1998
Policenauts	Konami	Konami	Unreleased	Unreleased	September 13, 1996
PowerSlave^{NA} Exhumed^{PAL} Seireki 1999: Pharaoh no Fukkatsu^{JP}	Lobotomy Software	BMG Interactive^{PAL/JP} Playmates Interactive Entertainment^{NA}	December 31, 1996	September 19, 1996	November 29, 1996
Primal Rage	Probe Entertainment	Time Warner Interactive^{WW} SoftBank Corp.^{JP}	June 14, 1996	August 1996	March 26, 1998
Princess Crown	Atlus	Atlus	Unreleased	Unreleased	December 11, 1997
Princess Maker 2	Gainax	Microcabin	Unreleased	Unreleased	October 27, 1995
Princess Maker: Yumemiru Yōsei	Ninelives	Gainax	Unreleased	Unreleased	June 18, 1998
Princess Quest	AIC Spirits; Increment P Corp.	Increment P Corp.	Unreleased	Unreleased	March 19, 1998
Prisoner of Ice: Jashin Kourin	Infogrames	Xing Entertainment	Unreleased	Unreleased	December 23, 1997
Pro Mahjong Kiwame S	Athena	Athena	Unreleased	Unreleased	January 12, 1996
Pro Pinball: The Web	Cunning Developments	Empire Interactive^{PAL} Interplay Productions^{NA}	October 31, 1996	August 1996	Unreleased
Pro Shinan Mahjong: Tsuwamono	Culture Brain	Culture Brain	Unreleased	Unreleased	July 8, 1999
Pro Yakyū Greatest Nine 97	Sega	Sega	Unreleased	Unreleased	March 28, 1997
Pro Yakyū Greatest Nine 97 Make Miracle	Sega	Sega	Unreleased	Unreleased	September 25, 1997
Pro Yakyū Greatest Nine 98	Sega	Sega	Unreleased	Unreleased	March 26, 1998
Pro Yakyū Greatest Nine 98 Summer Action	Sega	Sega	Unreleased	Unreleased	August 6, 1998
Pro Yakyū Team mo Tsukurou!	Sega	Sega	Unreleased	Unreleased	February 19, 1998
The Psychotron	Merit Studio	GAGA Communications	Unreleased	Unreleased	October 27, 1995
Pu·Li·Ru·La Arcade Gears	Goo!	Xing Entertainment	Unreleased	Unreleased	August 28, 1997
Pup-Breeder	Sai-Mate	Sai-Mate	Unreleased	Unreleased	November 1, 1996
Purikura Daisakusen	Atlus	Atlus	Unreleased	Unreleased	November 15, 1996
Puyo Puyo 2	Compile	Compile	Unreleased	Unreleased	October 27, 1995
Puyo Puyo Sun	Compile	Compile	Unreleased	Unreleased	February 14, 1997
Puyo Puyo Sun for SegaNet	Compile	Compile	Unreleased	Unreleased	September 4, 1997
Puzzle & Action: 2-do Arukoto wa Sand-R	CRI	CRI	Unreleased	Unreleased	April 5, 1996
Puzzle Bobble 3 for SegaNet	Taito	Taito	Unreleased	Unreleased	August 8, 1997
Pyon Pyon Kyaruru no Mahjong Hiyori	Natsu System	Natsume	Unreleased	Unreleased	December 20, 1996
Quake	Lobotomy Software	Sega	December 2, 1997	November 27, 1997	Unreleased
Quantum Gate I: Akumu no Joshou	Success; Fupac	GAGA Communications	Unreleased	Unreleased	September 29, 1995
Quarterback Attack with Mike Ditka	Digital Pictures	Digital Pictures	1995	Unreleased	Unreleased
Quiz Nanairo Dreams: Nijiiro-chō no Kiseki	Capcom	Capcom	Unreleased	Unreleased	June 27, 1997
QuoVadis	Glams	Glams	Unreleased	Unreleased	December 21, 1995
QuoVadis 2: Wakusei Kyoushuu Orphan Rei	Glams	Glams	Unreleased	Unreleased	April 4, 1997
R?MJ: The Mystery Hospital	System Sacom	Bandai	Unreleased	Unreleased	December 18, 1997
Rabbit	Aorn	Electronic Arts Victor	Unreleased	Unreleased	June 27, 1997
Race Drivin'	Time Warner Interactive	Time Warner Interactive	Unreleased	Unreleased	August 4, 1995
Radiant Silvergun	Treasure	Treasure / Entertainment Software Publishing	Unreleased	Unreleased	July 23, 1998
Rampage World Tour	Point of View	Midway^{NA} GT Interactive^{EU}	November 26, 1997	1998	Unreleased
Rampo	System Sacom	Sega	Unreleased	Unreleased	February 24, 1995
Rayman	Ubi Pictures	Ubi Soft	November 1995	November 1995	November 17, 1995
Real Bout Garō Densetsu	SNK	SNK	Unreleased	Unreleased	September 20, 1996
Real Bout Garō Densetsu Special	Yumekobo	SNK	Unreleased	Unreleased	December 23, 1997
Real Mahjong Adventure: Umi e Summer Waltz	SETA	SETA	Unreleased	Unreleased	November 5, 1998
Real Sound: Kaze no Regret	Warp	Warp	Unreleased	Unreleased	July 18, 1997
Refrain Love: Anata ni Aitai	Flight-Plan	Riverhillsoft	Unreleased	Unreleased	November 27, 1997
Resident Evil	Nextech	Capcom^{JP/NA} Sega^{PAL}	October 1, 1997	September 11, 1997	July 25, 1997
Return to Zork	Activision	Emotion Digital Software	Unreleased	Unreleased	February 2, 1996
Revolution X	Rage Software	Acclaim Entertainment	1996	March 29, 1996	April 26, 1996
Rise 2: Resurrection	Mirage Media	Acclaim Entertainment	1996	April 19, 1996	June 28, 1996
Riglord Saga 2	Sega; Microcabin	Sega	Unreleased	Unreleased	November 8, 1996
Riven: The Sequel to Myst	Sunsoft	Enix^{JP} Sega^{EU}	Unreleased	June 5, 1998	April 9, 1998
Road Rash	Buzz Puppet Productions; Advanced Technology Group	Electronic Arts^{WW} Electronic Arts Victor^{JP}	June 26, 1996	July 26, 1996	July 26, 1996
Robo Pit	Altron	Altron^{JP} Kokopeli Digital Studios^{WW}	1996	November 1996	February 16, 1996
Robotica^{NA} Robotica Cybernation Revolt^{PAL} Deadalus^{JP}	Micronet; Genki	Sega^{JP/PAL} Acclaim Entertainment^{NA}	1995	November 1995	March 24, 1995
Romance of the Three Kingdoms IV: Wall of Fire^{NA} Sangokushi IV^{JP}	Koei	Koei	1995	Unreleased	April 28, 1995
Ronde	Multimedia Intelligence Transfer	Atlus	Unreleased	Unreleased	October 30, 1997
Roommate: Ryōko Inoue	Fupac	Datam Polystar	Unreleased	Unreleased	February 14, 1997
Roommate 3: Ryōko Kaze no Kagayaku Asa ni	Vision Works	Datam Polystar	Unreleased	Unreleased	April 29, 1998
Roommate: Ryōko in Summer Vacation	Vision Works	Datam Polystar	Unreleased	Unreleased	September 25, 1997
Roommate W: Futari	NEST	Datam Polystar	Unreleased	Unreleased	January 14, 1999
Rox: 6 = Six	Altron	Altron	Unreleased	Unreleased	October 22, 1998
Ruriiro no Yuki	AIL	KID	Unreleased	Unreleased	December 10, 1998
Ryôko no Oshaberi Room	Datam Polystar; Fupac	Datam Polystar	Unreleased	Unreleased	April 22, 1999
Ryougae Puzzle Game Moujiya	Etona	Virgin Interactive Entertainment	Unreleased	Unreleased	December 20, 1996
Ryuuteki Gosennen: Dragons of China	Imagineer; Office I	Imagineer	Unreleased	Unreleased	May 23, 1997
Sakamoto Ryōma: Ishin Kaikoku	RON	KID	Unreleased	Unreleased	January 29, 1998
Sakura Taisen	Red Company; Sega CS2 R&D	Sega	Unreleased	Unreleased	September 27, 1996
Sakura Taisen 2: Kimi, Shinitamō Koto Nakare	Red Company; Sega CS2 R&D	Sega	Unreleased	Unreleased	April 4, 1998
Sakura Taisen Teigeki Graph	SIMS	Sega / Red Company	Unreleased	Unreleased	December 23, 1998
Sakura Tsuushin: Remaking Memories	Media Gallop	Media Group	Unreleased	Unreleased	October 1, 1998
Salamander Deluxe Pack Plus	Konami Computer Entertainment Tokyo	Konami	Unreleased	Unreleased	June 19, 1997
Samurai Spirits: Amakusa Kourin	SNK	SNK	Unreleased	Unreleased	October 2, 1997
Samurai Spirits: Zankurō Musōken	SIMS	SNK	Unreleased	Unreleased	November 8, 1996
Sangokushi Eiketsuden	Koei	Koei	Unreleased	Unreleased	March 29, 1996
Sangokushi IV with Power-Up Kit	Koei	Koei	Unreleased	Unreleased	September 11, 1997
Sangokushi Kōmeiden	Koei	Koei	Unreleased	Unreleased	March 28, 1997
Sangokushi Returns	Koei	Koei	Unreleased	Unreleased	January 31, 1997
Sangokushi V	Koei	Koei	Unreleased	Unreleased	September 27, 1996
Sankyo Fever Jikki Simulation S	Fill-in-Cafe	TEN Institute	Unreleased	Unreleased	April 4, 1997
Sankyo Fever Jikki Simulation S Vol. 2	TEN Institute	TEN Institute	Unreleased	Unreleased	January 15, 1998
Sankyo Fever Jikki Simulation S Vol. 3	TEN Institute	TEN Institute	Unreleased	Unreleased	November 26, 1998
Saturn Bomberman	Hudson Soft	Hudson Soft^{JP} Sega^{WW}	September 4, 1997	May 1, 1997	July 19, 1996
Saturn Bomberman Fight!!	Eleven	Hudson Soft	Unreleased	Unreleased	December 11, 1997
Saturn Bomberman for SegaNet	Hudson Soft	Hudson Soft	Unreleased	Unreleased	September 27, 1996
Savaki	Cynus	Microcabin	Unreleased	Unreleased	April 16, 1998
Scorcher	Zyrinx	Sega^{WW} Acclaim Entertainment^{JP}	March 1, 1997	May 15, 1997	August 22, 1997
Scud: The Disposable Assassin	Syrox Developments	SegaSoft	March 20, 1997	Unreleased	Unreleased
SD Gundam G Century S	Japan Art Media	Bandai	Unreleased	Unreleased	February 11, 1998
Sea Bass Fishing	Victor Entertainment	Victor Entertainment^{JP} JVC Musical Industries^{PAL}	Unreleased	September 1996	February 23, 1996
Sea Bass Fishing 2	A Wave	Victor Interactive Software	Unreleased	Unreleased	April 25, 1997
Sega Ages After Burner II	Rutubo Games	Sega	Unreleased	Unreleased	September 27, 1996
Sega Ages Columns Arcade Collection	Ancient	Sega	Unreleased	Unreleased	October 30, 1997
Sega Ages Fantasy Zone	Rutubo Games	Sega	Unreleased	Unreleased	February 21, 1997
Sega Ages Galaxy Force II	Appaloosa Interactive	Sega	Unreleased	Unreleased	July 2, 1998
Sega Ages I Love Mickey Mouse: Fushigi no Oshiro Daibouken/I Love Donald Duck: Guruzia Ou no Hihou	Sega	Sega	Unreleased	Unreleased	October 15, 1998
Sega Ages Memorial Selection Vol. 1	Sega	Sega	Unreleased	Unreleased	February 28, 1997
Sega Ages Memorial Selection Vol. 2	Sega	Sega	Unreleased	Unreleased	November 27, 1997
Sega Ages OutRun	Rutubo Games	Sega	Unreleased	Unreleased	September 20, 1996
Sega Ages Phantasy Star Collection	Sega	Sega	Unreleased	Unreleased	April 2, 1998
Sega Ages Power Drift	Sega	Sega	Unreleased	Unreleased	February 26, 1998
Sega Ages Rouka ni Ichidant-R	Sega	Sega	Unreleased	Unreleased	December 27, 1996
Sega Ages Vol. 1 Syukudai ga Tant-R	Sega	Sega	Unreleased	Unreleased	May 24, 1996
Sega Ages Vol. 2 Space Harrier	Rutubo Games	Sega	Unreleased	Unreleased	August 9, 1996
Sega International Victory Goal^{JP}	Sega	Sega	Unreleased	Unreleased	October 27, 1995
Sega Rally Championship	Sega AM3	Sega	November 15, 1995	January 24, 1996	December 29, 1995
Sega Rally Championship Plus	Sega AM3	Sega	Unreleased	Unreleased	September 26, 1996
Sega Saturn de Hakken!! Tamagotchi Park	Ancient	Bandai	Unreleased	Unreleased	January 29, 1998
Sega Touring Car Championship	Sega AM Annex	Sega	November 24, 1997	November 7, 1997	November 27, 1997
Sega Worldwide Soccer 97^{WW} Victory Goal Worldwide Edition^{JP}	Sega	Sega	October 28, 1996	October 17, 1996	November 29, 1996
Sega Worldwide Soccer '98: Club Edition^{PAL} Worldwide Soccer '98^{NA} Sega Worldwide Soccer '98^{JP}	Sega	Sega	November 18, 1997	October 16, 1997	March 5, 1998
Segata Sanshirō Shinken Yūgi	Ecole Software	Sega	Unreleased	Unreleased	October 29, 1998
Seifuku Densetsu Pretty Fighter X	Sol	Imagineer	Unreleased	Unreleased	June 16, 1995
Seikai Risshiden: Yoi Kuni Yoi Seiji	Digitalware	BMG Japan	Unreleased	Unreleased	June 27, 1997
Sengoku Blade	Psikyo	Atlus	Unreleased	Unreleased	November 22, 1996
Senken Kigyôden	Softstar Entertainment	Softstar Entertainment	Unreleased	Unreleased	March 4, 1999
Senkutsu Katsuryuu Taisen Chaos Seed	Neverland Company	Neverland Company / Entertainment Software Publishing	Unreleased	Unreleased	January 29, 1998
Sen Miyako Monogatari: Sono I	Ariadne	CRI	Unreleased	Unreleased	October 27, 1995
Senryaku Shōgi	Electronic Arts Victor	Electronic Arts Victor	Unreleased	Unreleased	November 17, 1995
Sentimental Graffiti	NEC Interchannel	NEC Interchannel	Unreleased	Unreleased	January 22, 1998
Sexy Parodius	Konami Computer Entertainment Tokyo	Konami	Unreleased	Unreleased	November 1, 1996
Shadows of the Tusk	Hudson Soft	Hudson Soft	Unreleased	Unreleased	May 21, 1998
Shanghai: Great Moments	Sunsoft	Sunsoft	Unreleased	Unreleased	November 15, 1996
Shanghai: Triple-Threat	Activision	Sunsoft^{JP} Activision^{NA}	September 1995	Unreleased	February 24, 1995
Shellshock	Core Design	Core Design^{PAL} U.S. Gold^{NA} Electronic Arts Victor^{JP}	June 14, 1996	April 19, 1996	October 25, 1996
She'sn	Gaibrain	KID	Unreleased	Unreleased	November 19, 1998
Sitisei Tôsin Guyferd: Crown Kaimetu Sakusen	Kouyousha	Capcom	Unreleased	Unreleased	November 19, 1998
Shichuu Suimei Pitagraph	Datam Polystar	Datam Polystar	Unreleased	Unreleased	February 23, 1996
Shienryu	Warashi	Warashi	Unreleased	Unreleased	June 27, 1997
Shingata Kururin Pa!	Sky Think System	Sky Think System	Unreleased	Unreleased	August 9, 1996
Shining Force III^{WW} Shining Force III Scenario 1: Oto no Kyoshin^{JP}	Sonic! Software Planning; Camelot Software Planning	Sega	July 31, 1998	June 12, 1998	December 11, 1997
Shining Force III Scenario 2: Nerewareta Miko	Sonic! Software Planning; Camelot Software Planning	Sega	Unreleased	Unreleased	April 29, 1998
Shining Force III Scenario 3: Hyouheki no Jashinguu	Sonic! Software Planning; Camelot Software Planning	Sega	Unreleased	Unreleased	September 23, 1998
Shining the Holy Ark	Sonic! Software Planning; Camelot Software Planning	Sega	July 14, 1997	June 19, 1997	December 20, 1996
Shining Wisdom	Sonic! Software Planning; Camelot Software Planning	Sega^{JP/PAL} Working Designs^{NA}	June 27, 1996	July 11, 1996	August 11, 1995
Shin Kaitei Gunkan: Koutetsu no Kodoku	ASCII	ASCII	Unreleased	Unreleased	April 4, 1997
Shin Megami Tensei: Devil Summoner	Atlus	Atlus	Unreleased	Unreleased	December 25, 1995
Shinobi Legions^{NA} Shin Shinobi Den^{JP} Shinobi X^{PAL}	Sega	Sega^{JP/PAL} Vic Tokai^{NA}	September 1995	October 1995	June 30, 1995
Shinouken	Saurus; System Vision	SNK	Unreleased	Unreleased	April 4, 1997
Shinpi no Sekai El-Hazard	TamTam	Pioneer LDC	Unreleased	Unreleased	August 9, 1996
Shinrei Jusatsushi Tarōmaru	Time Warner Interactive	Time Warner Interactive	Unreleased	Unreleased	January 17, 1997
Shinseiki Evangerion	Sega	Sega	Unreleased	Unreleased	March 1, 1996
Shinseiki Evangerion: 2nd Impression	Sega	Sega	Unreleased	Unreleased	March 7, 1997
Shinseiki Evangerion: Dejitaru Kaado Raiburari	Sega	Sega	Unreleased	Unreleased	September 25, 1997
Shinseiki Evangerion: Eva to Yukaina Nakama-tachi	TamTam	Gainax	Unreleased	Unreleased	November 5, 1998
Shinseiki Evangerion: Kōtetsu no Gārufurendo	Gainax	Sega	Unreleased	Unreleased	March 26, 1998
Shinsetsu Samurai Spirits Bushidō Retsuden	SNK; Asatsu; Fuji Television	SNK	Unreleased	Unreleased	June 27, 1997
Shin Theme Park	Tose	Electronic Arts Victor	Unreleased	Unreleased	April 11, 1997
Shippū Mahō Daisakusen: Kingdom-Grandprix	Raizing	GAGA Communications	Unreleased	Unreleased	June 14, 1996
Shiroki Majo: Mōhitotsu no Eiyū Densetsu	Hudson Soft	Hudson Soft	Unreleased	Unreleased	February 26, 1998
Shockwave Assault	Paradox Development	Electronic Arts	June 26, 1996	July 5, 1996	Unreleased
Shōgi Matsuri	SETA	SETA	Unreleased	Unreleased	September 15, 1995
Shoujo Kakumei Utena: Itsuka Kakumei Sareru Monogatari	Sega	Sega	Unreleased	Unreleased	May 28, 1998
Shouryuu Sangoku Engi	RON	Imagineer	Unreleased	Unreleased	July 19, 1996
Shunsai: Keiba Data Stable	Naxat Soft	Naxat Soft	Unreleased	Unreleased	August 23, 1996
Shusse Mahjong Daisettai	King Records	King Records	Unreleased	Unreleased	December 13, 1996
Shutokō Battle '97	Genki	Imagineer	Unreleased	Unreleased	February 28, 1997
Shutsudou! Minisuka Police	Sada Soft	Sada Soft	Unreleased	Unreleased	September 25, 1997
Side Pocket 3	Data East	Data East	Unreleased	Unreleased	July 18, 1997
Silhouette Mirage	Treasure	Entertainment Software Publishing	Unreleased	Unreleased	September 11, 1997
SimCity 2000	Maxis	Sega^{JP} Maxis^{WW}	October 11, 1995	December 8, 1995	September 29, 1995
Simulation RPG Tsukuru	Pegasus Japan	ASCII	Unreleased	Unreleased	September 17, 1998
Simulation Zoo	C&E	SoftBank Corp.	Unreleased	Unreleased	February 7, 1997
Skeleton Warriors	Neversoft	Playmates Interactive Entertainment	April 16, 1996	September 4, 1996	Unreleased
Skull Fang: Kuuga Gaiden	Aisystem Tokyo	Data East	Unreleased	Unreleased	May 30, 1997
Sky Target	Appaloosa Interactive	Sega	July 1997	June 5, 1997	April 25, 1997
Slam 'N Jam '96 featuring Magic & Kareem	Left Field Productions	Crystal Dynamics^{WW} BMG Victor^{JP}	May 22, 1996	July 1996	August 9, 1996
Slayers Royal	Onion Egg	Kadokawa Shoten / Entertainment Software Publishing	Unreleased	Unreleased	July 25, 1997
Slayers Royal 2	Onion Egg	Kadokawa Shoten / Entertainment Software Publishing	Unreleased	Unreleased	September 3, 1998
Snatcher	Konami Computer Entertainment Tokyo	Konami	Unreleased	Unreleased	March 29, 1996
Sokkō Seitokai: Sonic Council	SIMS	Banpresto	Unreleased	Unreleased	January 29, 1998
Sol Divide	Boom	Atlus	Unreleased	Unreleased	July 2, 1998
Solar Eclipse^{NA} Titan Wars^{PAL/JP}	Crystal Dynamics	Crystal Dynamics^{WW} BMG Victor^{JP}	November 27, 1995	April 12, 1996	April 19, 1996
Solo Crisis	Quintet	Quintet	Unreleased	Unreleased	January 22, 1998
Söldnerschild	Koei	Sega	Unreleased	Unreleased	September 25, 1997
Sonic 3D Blast^{NA} Sonic 3D: Flickies' Island^{PAL/JP}	Traveller's Tales; Sonic Team	Sega	November 20, 1996	February 14, 1997	October 14, 1999
Sonic Jam	Sonic Team	Sega	August 20, 1997	August 28, 1997	June 20, 1997
Sonic R	Traveller's Tales; Sonic Team	Sega	November 18, 1997	November 21, 1997	December 4, 1997
Sonic Wings Special	Video System	MediaQuest	Unreleased	Unreleased	July 5, 1996
Sorvice	Altron	Altron	Unreleased	Unreleased	September 23, 1998
Sotsugyō Crossworld	Sofix	Shogakukan Production	Unreleased	Unreleased	March 28, 1997
Sotsugyō S	Headroom	NEC Interchannel	Unreleased	Unreleased	September 25, 1997
Sotsugyō II Neo Generation	Headroom; Tenky	Riverhillsoft	Unreleased	Unreleased	August 11, 1995
Sotsugyō III Wedding Bell	Westone	Shogakukan Production	Unreleased	Unreleased	April 9, 1998
Sōkū no Tsubasa: Gotha World	Micronet	Micronet	Unreleased	Unreleased	November 6, 1997
Sōkyūgurentai	Raizing	Electronic Arts Victor	Unreleased	Unreleased	February 7, 1997
Sound Novel Tsukūru 2	ASCII	ASCII	Unreleased	Unreleased	December 18, 1997
Sound Qube	Media Entertainment	Human Entertainment	Unreleased	Unreleased	April 2, 1998
Soviet Strike	Tiburon Entertainment	Electronic Arts^{WW} Electronic Arts Victor^{JP}	February 17, 1997	February 21, 1997	September 18, 1997
Space Hulk: Vengeance of the Blood Angels	Krisalis Software	Electronic Arts	1996	September 27, 1996	Unreleased
Space Invaders	Taito	Taito	Unreleased	Unreleased	December 13, 1996
Space Jam	Sculptured Software	Acclaim Entertainment	November 26, 1996	March 14, 1997	February 28, 1997
Spot Goes To Hollywood	Burst Studios	Virgin Interactive Entertainment	January 22, 1997	1997	January 10, 1997
Stakes Winner 2: Saikyou Uma Densetsu	Saurus	SNK	Unreleased	Unreleased	May 2, 1997
Stakes Winner: GI Kanzen Seiha Heno Michi	Saurus	SNK	Unreleased	Unreleased	December 6, 1996
Standby Say You!	Human Entertainment	Human Entertainment	Unreleased	Unreleased	March 20, 1997
The Star Bowling	Yumedia	Yumedia	Unreleased	Unreleased	November 13, 1997
The Star Bowling Vol. 2	Yumedia	Yumedia	Unreleased	Unreleased	January 15, 1998
Starfighter 3000^{PAL/JP} Star Fighter^{NA}	Krisalis Software	Telstar^{PAL} Acclaim Entertainment^{NA} Imagineer^{JP}	September 3, 1996	June 21, 1996	October 25, 1996
SteamGear Mash	Tamsoft	Takara	Unreleased	Unreleased	September 29, 1995
Steam-Heart's	Giga	TGL	Unreleased	Unreleased	September 23, 1998
Steeldom	Technosoft	Technosoft	Unreleased	Unreleased	September 6, 1996
Steep Slope Sliders	Cave	Pack-In-Video^{JP} Sega^{WW}	December 16, 1997	January 16, 1998	October 23, 1997
Stellar Assault SS	SIMS	SIMS	Unreleased	Unreleased	February 26, 1998
Strahl: Himerareshi Nanatsu no Hikari	Media Entertainment	Media Entertainment	Unreleased	Unreleased	November 24, 1995
Street Fighter Alpha: Warriors' Dreams^{WW} Street Fighter Zero^{JP}	Capcom	Capcom^{JP/NA} Virgin Interactive Entertainment^{PAL}	1996	May 22, 1996	January 26, 1996
Street Fighter Alpha 2^{WW} Street Fighter Zero 2^{JP}	Capcom	Capcom^{JP/NA} Virgin Interactive Entertainment^{PAL}	November 1, 1996	November 16, 1996	September 14, 1996
Street Fighter Zero 3	Capcom	Capcom	Unreleased	Unreleased	August 6, 1999
Street Fighter Collection	Capcom	Capcom^{JP/NA} Virgin Interactive Entertainment^{PAL}	December 16, 1997	March 1998	September 18, 1997
Street Fighter II Movie	Capcom	Capcom	Unreleased	Unreleased	March 15, 1996
Street Fighter: The Movie	Capcom	Capcom^{JP} Acclaim Entertainment^{WW}	August 23, 1995	September 1995	August 11, 1995
Street Racer^{PAL} Street Racer Extra^{JP}	Vivid Image	Ubi Soft	Unreleased	November 16, 1996	December 20, 1996
Strikers 1945	Psikyo	Atlus	Unreleased	Unreleased	June 28, 1996
Strikers 1945 II	Kuusou Kagaku	Psikyo	Unreleased	Unreleased	October 22, 1998
Striker '96	Rage Software	Acclaim Entertainment	May 31, 1996	July 1996	August 30, 1996
Suchie-Pai Adventure: Doki Doki Nightmare	Jaleco	Jaleco	Unreleased	Unreleased	February 26, 1998
Sugobenchā: Dragon Master Silk Gaiden	Gimmick House	Datam Polystar	Unreleased	Unreleased	February 19, 1998
Suiko Enbu: Fuunsaiki	Data East	Data East	Unreleased	Unreleased	March 22, 1996
Suikoden: Tendou 108 Sei	Koei	Koei	Unreleased	Unreleased	December 18, 1997
Suikoden: Tenmei no Chikai	Koei	Koei	Unreleased	Unreleased	December 27, 1996
Super Adventure Rockman	Kouyousha	Capcom	Unreleased	Unreleased	June 25, 1998
Super Casino Special	Coconuts Japan	Coconuts Japan	Unreleased	Unreleased	January 24, 1997
Super Puzzle Fighter II Turbo^{WW} Super Puzzle Fighter II X^{JP}	Capcom	Capcom^{JP/NA} Virgin Interactive Entertainment^{PAL}	February 28, 1997	April 1997	December 6, 1996
Super Real Mahjong Graffiti	SETA	SETA	Unreleased	Unreleased	November 24, 1995
Super Real Mahjong P7	SETA	SETA	Unreleased	Unreleased	May 21, 1998
Super Real Mahjong PV	SETA	SETA	Unreleased	Unreleased	May 26, 1995
Super Real Mahjong P VI	SETA	SETA	Unreleased	Unreleased	May 17, 1996
Super Robot Taisen F	Winkysoft	Banpresto	Unreleased	Unreleased	September 25, 1997
Super Robot Taisen F Kanketsuhen	Winkysoft	Banpresto	Unreleased	Unreleased	April 23, 1998
Super Tempo	Aspect; Red Company	MediaQuest	Unreleased	Unreleased	April 29, 1998
Swagman	Core Design	Eidos Interactive	Unreleased	April 1997	Unreleased
Sword & Sorcery	Microcabin	Microcabin	Unreleased	Unreleased	May 31, 1996
Tactical Fighter	TamTam; Dream Japan	Media Rings	Unreleased	Unreleased	October 16, 1997
Tactics Formula	AKI	Sega	Unreleased	Unreleased	October 9, 1997
Tactics Ogre	Riverhillsoft	Riverhillsoft	Unreleased	Unreleased	December 13, 1996
Tadaima Wakusei Kaitakuchuu!	Altron	Altron	Unreleased	Unreleased	November 3, 1995
Taiheiyou no Arashi 2: Shippuu no Moudou	SIMS	Imagineer	Unreleased	Unreleased	June 13, 1997
Taikō Risshiden II	Koei	Koei	Unreleased	Unreleased	November 29, 1996
Taikyoku Shōgi Kiwame II	Log Corporation	Mainichi Communications	Unreleased	Unreleased	November 29, 1996
Taito Chase H.Q. Plus S.C.I.	Taito	Taito	Unreleased	Unreleased	August 9, 1996
Takuramakan: Tonkou Denki	Alfa System	Patra	Unreleased	Unreleased	December 27, 1996
Tama	Time Warner Interactive	Time Warner Interactive	Unreleased	Unreleased	November 22, 1994
Tanjou S: Debut	Access; Headroom; Image Works	NEC Interchannel	Unreleased	Unreleased	June 28, 1996
Tantei Jingūji Saburō: Mikan no Rupo	Data East	Data East	Unreleased	Unreleased	November 29, 1996
Tantei Jingūji Saburō: Yume no Owari ni	Data East	Data East	Unreleased	Unreleased	July 9, 1998
Teitoku no Ketsudan III	Koei	Koei	Unreleased	Unreleased	June 27, 1997
Teitoku no Ketsudan III with Power-Up Kit	Koei	Koei	Unreleased	Unreleased	March 26, 1998
Tempest 2000	High Voltage Software	Interplay Productions	December 20, 1996	March 20, 1997	Unreleased
Tenant Wars	KID	KID	Unreleased	Unreleased	February 11, 1998
Ten Pin Alley	Adrenalin Interactive	ASC Games	October 30, 1997	Unreleased	Unreleased
Tenchi Muyō! Mimiri Onsen: Yukemuri no Tabi	Yumedia	Yumedia	Unreleased	Unreleased	February 9, 1996
Tenchi Muyō!: Rensa Hitsuyō	Access	Pioneer LDC	Unreleased	Unreleased	February 28, 1997
Tenchi Muyō!: Tōkō Muyō - Aniraji Collection	Xing Entertainment	Xing Entertainment	Unreleased	Unreleased	January 17, 1997
Tenchi wo Kurau 2: Sekiheki no Tatakai	Capcom	Capcom	Unreleased	Unreleased	September 6, 1996
Tengai Makyō: Daiyon no Mokushiroku	Hudson Soft; Red Company	Hudson Soft	Unreleased	Unreleased	January 14, 1997
Tenka Seiha	RON	Imagineer	Unreleased	Unreleased	August 8, 1997
Tennis Arena	Smart Dog	Ubi Soft	Unreleased	Unreleased	April 9, 1998
Terra Cresta 3D	Nichibutsu	Nichibutsu	Unreleased	Unreleased	August 8, 1997
Terra Phantastica	Chime	Sega	Unreleased	Unreleased	December 27, 1996
Tetris Plus	Natsume	Jaleco^{JP/NA} JVC Music Europe^{EU}	October 18, 1996	1997	August 30, 1996
Tetris S	Bullet-Proof Software	Bullet-Proof Software	Unreleased	Unreleased	December 27, 1996
Texthoth Ludo: Arcana Senki	Falcon	Pai	Unreleased	Unreleased	December 18, 1997
Theme Park	Krisalis Software	Electronic Arts^{WW} Electronic Arts Victor^{JP}	1995	November 1995	December 22, 1995
Three Dirty Dwarves	Appaloosa Interactive	SegaSoft^{WW} Sega^{JP}	September 27, 1996	April 3, 1997	May 30, 1997
Thunder Force: Gold Pack 1	Technosoft	Technosoft	Unreleased	Unreleased	September 27, 1996
Thunder Force: Gold Pack 2	Technosoft	Technosoft	Unreleased	Unreleased	December 6, 1996
Thunder Force V	Technosoft	Technosoft	Unreleased	Unreleased	July 11, 1997
Thunder Storm & Road Blaster	Ecseco Development	Ecseco Development	Unreleased	Unreleased	October 20, 1995
Tilk: Aoi Umi kara Kita Shoujo	TGL	TGL	Unreleased	Unreleased	December 23, 1997
Time Bokan Series: Bokan to Ippatsu! Doronboo Kanpekiban	Eleven	Banpresto	Unreleased	Unreleased	September 25, 1997
Time Commando	Virtual Studio	Acclaim Entertainment	Unreleased	Unreleased	March 12, 1998
Time Gal & Ninja Hayate	Ecseco Development	Ecseco Development	Unreleased	Unreleased	January 17, 1997
Tokimeki Mahjong Graffiti: Toshishita no Tenshi Tachi	Sonnet Computer Entertainment	Sonnet Computer Entertainment	Unreleased	Unreleased	May 3, 1996
Tokimeki Mahjong Paradise: Koi no Tenpai Beat	Sonnet Computer Entertainment	Sonnet Computer Entertainment	Unreleased	Unreleased	October 20, 1995
Tokimeki Memorial Drama Series Vol. 1: Nijiiro no Seishun	Konami Computer Entertainment Japan	Konami	Unreleased	Unreleased	July 10, 1997
Tokimeki Memorial Drama Series Vol. 2: Irodori no Love Song	Konami Computer Entertainment Japan	Konami	Unreleased	Unreleased	March 26, 1998
Tokimeki Memorial Drama Series Vol. 3: Tabidachi no Uta	Konami Computer Entertainment Japan	Konami	Unreleased	Unreleased	April 1, 1999
Tokimeki Memorial: Forever With You	Konami	Konami	Unreleased	Unreleased	July 19, 1996
Tokimeki Memorial Selection: Fujisaki Shiori	Konami	Konami	Unreleased	Unreleased	March 27, 1997
Tokimeki Memorial Taisen Puzzle-Dama	Konami	Konami	Unreleased	Unreleased	September 27, 1996
Tokimeki Memorial Taisen Tokkae Dama	Konami	Konami	Unreleased	Unreleased	August 7, 1997
Tokusou Kidoutai J SWAT	Japan Media Programming	Banpresto	Unreleased	Unreleased	August 23, 1996
Tokyo Shadow	Taito	Taito	Unreleased	Unreleased	April 25, 1997
Tomb Raider	Core Design	Eidos Interactive^{WW} Victor Interactive Software^{JP}	November 14, 1996	October 24, 1996	January 24, 1997
Top Anglers: Super Fishing Big Fight 2	Geo Factory	Naxat Soft	Unreleased	Unreleased	June 27, 1997
Touge King: The Spirits 2	Cave	Atlus	Unreleased	Unreleased	April 18, 1997
Tour Party: Sotsugyō Ryokô ni Ikô	Japan Media Programming	Takara	Unreleased	Unreleased	April 23, 1998
Touryuu Densetsu: Elan Doreé	Sai-Mate	Kamata and Partners	Unreleased	Unreleased	January 14, 1999
The Tower	OPeNBooK	OPeNBooK	Unreleased	Unreleased	March 1, 1996
Transport Tycoon	MicroProse	Imagineer	Unreleased	Unreleased	November 20, 1997
Trash It	Rage Software	GT Interactive	Unreleased	1997	Unreleased
True Pinball^{WW} Tekkyuu: True Pinball^{JP}	Digital Illusions	Ocean Software^{WW} GAGA Communications^{JP}	October 31, 1996	April 5, 1996	April 5, 1996
Tryrush Deppy	System Supply N-Tech	Nihon Create	Unreleased	Unreleased	November 22, 1996
Tsuukai!! Slot Shooting	Shōeisha	Shōeisha	Unreleased	Unreleased	June 14, 1996
Tunnel B1^{WW} 3D Mission Shooting: Finalist^{JP}	NEON Software	Ocean Software^{PAL} Acclaim Entertainment^{NA} GAGA Communications^{JP}	January 15, 1997	October 16, 1996	August 29, 1997
TurfWind '96: Take Yutaka Kyousouba Ikusei Game	Jaleco	Jaleco	Unreleased	Unreleased	October 4, 1996
Tutankhamen no Nazo: Ankh	Ray Corporation	Ray Corporation	Unreleased	Unreleased	November 20, 1997
Twinkle Star Sprites	ADK	ADK	Unreleased	Unreleased	December 18, 1997
UEFA Euro 96 England	Gremlin Interactive	Sega	Unreleased	May 30, 1996	Unreleased
Ultimate Mortal Kombat 3	Eurocom	Williams Entertainment^{NA} GT Interactive^{PAL}	June 27, 1996	June 1996	Unreleased
Ultraman: Hikari no Kyojin Densetsu	SIMS	Bandai	Unreleased	Unreleased	December 20, 1996
Umanari 1 Furlong Gekijou	Micro Vision	Micro Vision	Unreleased	Unreleased	December 4, 1997
Universal Nuts	Lay-Up	Lay-Up	Unreleased	Unreleased	December 18, 1997
Uno DX	Mitsui & Co.	MediaQuest	Unreleased	Unreleased	January 29, 1998
The Unsolved	Japan Media Programming	Virgin Interactive Entertainment	Unreleased	Unreleased	May 2, 1997
Valora Valley Golf^{WW} The Hyper Golf: Devil's Course^{JP}	T&E Soft	Vic Tokai	December 1995	April 12, 1996	December 15, 1996
Vampire Savior: The Lord of Vampire	Capcom	Capcom	Unreleased	Unreleased	April 16, 1998
Vandal Hearts: Ushinawareta Kodai Bunmei	Konami Computer Entertainment Nagoya	Konami	Unreleased	Unreleased	November 27, 1997
Vatlva	Ancient	JVC	Unreleased	Unreleased	December 6, 1996
Victory Boxing^{PAL} King of Boxing^{JP} Center Ring Boxing^{NA}	Victor Entertainment	Victor Entertainment^{JP} JVC Musical Industries^{WW}	December 1995	December 1995	October 20, 1995
Victory Goal	Sega	Sega	Unreleased	Unreleased	January 20, 1995
Victory Goal '96	Sega	Sega	Unreleased	Unreleased	March 29, 1996
Virtua Call S	Fairytale	KID	Unreleased	Unreleased	October 29, 1998
Virtua Cop	Sega AM2	Sega	November 15, 1995	December 8, 1995	November 24, 1995
Virtua Cop 2	Sega AM2	Sega	November 22, 1996	November 28, 1996	November 22, 1996
Virtua Fighter	Sega AM2	Sega	May 11, 1995	July 8, 1995	November 22, 1994
Virtua Fighter 2	Sega AM2	Sega	November 30, 1995	January 5, 1996	December 1, 1995
Virtua Fighter Kids	Sega AM2	Sega	September 3, 1996	September 26, 1996	July 26, 1996
Virtua Fighter Remix	Sega AM1	Sega	October 2, 1995	October 27, 1995	July 14, 1995
Virtual Casino	Digital Factory	DATT Japan^{JP} Natsume Inc.^{NA}	December 12, 1996	Unreleased	March 15, 1996
Virtual Golf^{EU} Tournament Leader^{JP}	Core Design	Core Design^{EU} Victor Entertainment^{JP}	Unreleased	February 1996	August 23, 1996
Virtual Hydlide	T&E Soft	Sega^{JP/PAL} Atlus^{NA}	September 1995	December 29, 1995	April 28, 1995
Virtual Kyoutei	Nichibutsu	Nichibutsu	Unreleased	Unreleased	December 20, 1996
Virtual Kyoutei 2	Nichibutsu	Nichibutsu	Unreleased	Unreleased	December 4, 1997
Virtual Mahjong	Micronet	Micronet	Unreleased	Unreleased	March 5, 1998
Virtual On: Cyber Troopers	Sega AM3; CRI	Sega	November 8, 1996	January 1997	November 29, 1996
Virtual On: Cyber Troopers for SegaNet	Sega AM3; CRI	Sega	Unreleased	Unreleased	December 31, 1996
Virtual Open Tennis	Imagineer	Imagineer^{JP} Acclaim Entertainment^{WW}	May 31, 1996	June 6, 1996	October 27, 1995
Virtual Volleyball	SIMS	Imagineer	Unreleased	Unreleased	July 21, 1995
Virtua Photo Studio	Transpegasus Limited	Acclaim Entertainment	Unreleased	Unreleased	March 29, 1996
VR Soccer^{NA} Actua Soccer^{JP}	Gremlin Interactive	Naxat Soft^{JP} VR Sports^{NA}	December 20, 1996	Unreleased	October 4, 1996
VR Virtua Racing^{WW} Virtua Racing Sega Saturn^{JP}	Time Warner Interactive	Time Warner Interactive	November 6, 1995	November 1995	December 22, 1995
Virus	Hudson Soft	Hudson Soft	Unreleased	Unreleased	August 22, 1997
Voice Fantasia S: Ushinawareta Voice Power	Pre-Stage; Japan Media Programming	ASK Kodansha	Unreleased	Unreleased	July 25, 1997
Voice Idol Maniacs: Pool Bar Story	Four Winds Software	Data East	Unreleased	Unreleased	April 4, 1997
Wachenröder	TNS	Sega	Unreleased	Unreleased	August 6, 1998
Waialae no Kiseki: Extra 36 Holes	T&E Soft	T&E Soft	Unreleased	Unreleased	February 28, 1997
Waku Waku 7	Sunsoft	Sunsoft	Unreleased	Unreleased	June 20, 1997
Waku Waku Monster	Altron	Altron	Unreleased	Unreleased	July 30, 1998
Waku Waku Puyo Puyo Dungeon	Compile	Compile	Unreleased	Unreleased	April 2, 1998
WanChai Connection	Micronet	Sega	Unreleased	Unreleased	November 22, 1994
Wangan Dead Heat + Real Arrange	Genki	Pack-In-Video	Unreleased	Unreleased	August 30, 1996
Wangan Trial Love	Victor Interactive Software	Pack-In-Video	Unreleased	Unreleased	April 2, 1998
Wara^{2} Wars: Gekitou! Daigundan Battle	Shōeisha	Shōeisha	Unreleased	Unreleased	May 23, 1997
Warcraft II: The Dark Saga	Climax	Electronic Arts^{WW} Electronic Arts Victor^{JP}	August 20, 1997	July 1997	November 27, 1997
Welcome House	Highwaystar	Imagineer	Unreleased	Unreleased	June 13, 1997
Whizz	Flair Software	Konami^{EU} Emotion Digital Software / B-Factory^{JP}	Unreleased	August 1997	August 29, 1997
Williams Arcade's Greatest Hits	Digital Eclipse	Midway	December 23, 1996	Unreleased	Unreleased
Willy Wombat	Westone	Hudson Soft	Unreleased	Unreleased	June 27, 1997
Wing Arms	Bell Corporation	Sega	January 1996	February 1996	September 29, 1995
Winning Post 2	Koei	Koei	Unreleased	Unreleased	March 22, 1996
Winning Post 2: Final '97	Koei	Koei	Unreleased	Unreleased	October 2, 1997
Winning Post 2: Program '96	Koei	Koei	Unreleased	Unreleased	October 4, 1996
Winning Post 3	Koei	Koei	Unreleased	Unreleased	April 2, 1998
Winning Post 3: Program '98	Koei	Koei	Unreleased	Unreleased	December 3, 1998
Winning Post EX^{JP} Winning Post^{NA}	Koei	Koei	March 1996	Unreleased	August 11, 1995
Winter Heat	Data East	Sega	February 18, 1998	February 6, 1998	February 5, 1998
Wipeout	Tantalus Entertainment	Psygnosis^{PAL} Sega^{NA} SoftBank Corp.^{JP}	May 3, 1996	March 29, 1996	July 12, 1996
Wipeout 2097^{PAL} Wipeout XL^{JP}	Tantalus Entertainment; Perfect Entertainment	Psygnosis^{PAL} SoftBank Corp.^{JP}	Unreleased	September 25, 1997	March 5, 1998
With You: Mitsumete Itai	Stack	NEC Interchannel	Unreleased	Unreleased	July 29, 1999
Wizard's Harmony	Arc System Works	Arc System Works	Unreleased	Unreleased	December 29, 1995
Wizard's Harmony 2	Arc System Works	Arc System Works	Unreleased	Unreleased	December 23, 1997
Wizardry: Llylgamyn Saga	Soliton Soft	Locus	Unreleased	Unreleased	November 26, 1998
Wizardry Nemesis	Thunderstone Japan	Shouei System	Unreleased	Unreleased	January 22, 1998
Wizardry VI & VII Complete	Goo!	Data East	Unreleased	Unreleased	May 31, 1996
Wolf Fang SS Kūga 2001	Xing Entertainment	Xing Entertainment	Unreleased	Unreleased	March 28, 1997
Wonder 3 Arcade Gears	MBA International	Xing Entertainment	Unreleased	Unreleased	March 5, 1998
World Advanced Daisenryaku: Sakusen File	Sega	Sega	Unreleased	Unreleased	March 15, 1996
World Cup '98 France: Road to Win	Sega	Sega	Unreleased	Unreleased	June 11, 1998
World Cup Golf: Professional Edition^{WW} Golf In Hyatt Dorado Beach^{JP}	Arc Developments	U.S. Gold^{WW} Soft Vision^{JP}	1996	February 1996	March 29, 1996
World Evolution Soccer	Jack Pot	Asmik	Unreleased	Unreleased	June 27, 1997
World Heroes Perfect	ADK	SNK	Unreleased	Unreleased	August 9, 1996
World League Soccer '98	Silicon Dreams	Sega	Unreleased	June 5, 1998	Unreleased
World Series Baseball	Sega	Sega	November 1995	November 1995	November 17, 1995
World Series Baseball II	Sega	Sega	August 24, 1996	October 10, 1996	October 25, 1996
World Series Baseball '98	Sega	Sega	July 22, 1997	Unreleased	March 28, 1997
Worldwide Soccer: Sega International Victory Goal Edition^{NA} International Victory Goal^{PAL}	Sega	Sega	May 11, 1995	July 8, 1995	Unreleased
Worms	Team17	Ocean Software^{WW} I'MAX^{JP}	June 27, 1996	December 1995	March 14, 1997
WWF In Your House	Sculptured Software	Acclaim Entertainment	November 23, 1996	November 8, 1996	February 21, 1997
WWF WrestleMania: The Arcade Game	Sculptured Software	Acclaim Entertainment	May 30, 1996	June 1996	August 9, 1996
X Japan Virtual Shock 001	i2 Project	Sega	Unreleased	Unreleased	October 20, 1995
X-Men: Children of the Atom	Rutubo Games	Capcom^{JP} Acclaim Entertainment^{WW}	April 3, 1996	April 12, 1996	November 22, 1995
X-Men vs. Street Fighter	Capcom	Capcom	Unreleased	Unreleased	November 27, 1997
The Yakyuuken Special: Konya wa 12-kaisen	Societa Daikanyama	Societa Daikanyama	Unreleased	Unreleased	July 28, 1995
Yellow Brick Road	Synergy, Inc	Acclaim Entertainment	Unreleased	Unreleased	August 30, 1996
Yoshimoto Mahjong Club	Psikyo	Psikyo	Unreleased	Unreleased	December 17, 1998
Yoshimura Shōgi	Konami Computer Entertainment Tokyo	Konami	Unreleased	Unreleased	March 26, 1998
Yumimi Mix Remix	Game Arts	Game Arts	Unreleased	Unreleased	July 28, 1995
YU-NO: Kono Yo no Hate de Koi o Utau Shōjo	ELF	ELF	Unreleased	Unreleased	December 4, 1997
Yuukyuu Gensoukyoku	Starlight Marry	MediaWorks	Unreleased	Unreleased	July 18, 1997
Yuukyuu Gensoukyoku 2nd Album	Starlight Marry	MediaWorks	Unreleased	Unreleased	February 26, 1998
Yuukyuu Gensoukyoku Ensemble	Starlight Marry	MediaWorks	Unreleased	Unreleased	December 10, 1998
Yuukyuu Gensoukyoku Ensemble 2	Starlight Marry	MediaWorks	Unreleased	Unreleased	March 4, 1999
Yuushun Classic Road	Victor Interactive Software	Victor Interactive Software	Unreleased	Unreleased	March 14, 1997
Z	The Bitmap Brothers	GT Interactive	Unreleased	April 1998	Unreleased
Zanma Chouougi Valhollian	DATT Japan	Kamata and Partners	Unreleased	Unreleased	August 6, 1998
Zap! Snowboarding Trix	Atelier Double	Pony Canyon	Unreleased	Unreleased	February 21, 1997
Zap! Snowboarding Trix '98	Atelier Double	Pony Canyon	Unreleased	Unreleased	December 18, 1997
Zenkoku Seifuku Bishōjo Grand Prix Find Love	TamTam; F Creative Factory	Daiki	Unreleased	Unreleased	October 2, 1997
Zen-Nihon Pro Wrestling Featuring Virtua	Scarab	Sega	Unreleased	Unreleased	October 23, 1997
Zero4 Champ DooZy-J Type-R	Media Rings	Media Rings	Unreleased	Unreleased	June 20, 1997
Zero Divide: The Final Conflict	Zoom	Zoom	Unreleased	Unreleased	November 20, 1997
Zoku Gussun Oyoyo	Irem	Banpresto	Unreleased	Unreleased	February 28, 1997
Zoku Hatsukoi Monogatari: Shūgaku Ryokō	Koga Game Factory	Tokuma Shoten Intermedia	Unreleased	Unreleased	December 3, 1998
Zoop	Hookstone	MediaQuest	Unreleased	Unreleased	November 29, 1996
Zork Collection	Shōeisha	Shōeisha	Unreleased	Unreleased	March 12, 1998
Zork I: The Great Underground Empire	Shōeisha	Shōeisha	Unreleased	Unreleased	March 15, 1996

== Non-game software and compilations ==
Title(s)	Developer(s)	Publisher(s)	NA	PAL	JP
Ai Iijima: Good Island Cafe	Inner Brain	Inner Brain	Unreleased	Unreleased	September 27, 1996
Aqua-World: Umi Monogatari	Mizuki	Masudaya	Unreleased	Unreleased	July 12, 1996
Aquazone Desktop Life	9003	9003	Unreleased	Unreleased	July 12, 1996
Aquazone Option Disc Series 1 Angel Fish	OPeNBooK9003	OPeNBooK9003	Unreleased	Unreleased	December 20, 1996
Aquazone Option Disc Series 2 Black Molly	OPeNBooK9003	OPeNBooK9003	Unreleased	Unreleased	December 20, 1996
Aquazone Option Disc Series 3 Blue Emperor	OPeNBooK9003	OPeNBooK9003	Unreleased	Unreleased	December 20, 1996
Aquazone Option Disc Series 4 Clown Loach	OPeNBooK9003	OPeNBooK9003	Unreleased	Unreleased	December 20, 1996
Aquazone Option Disc Series 5 False Rummy-Nose	OPeNBooK9003	OPeNBooK9003	Unreleased	Unreleased	December 20, 1996
Ayrton Senna Personal Talk: Message for the future	Sega	Sega	Unreleased	Unreleased	April 28, 1995
Chisato Moritaka: Watarasebashi/Lala Sunshine	Oracion	Oracion / Sega	Unreleased	Unreleased	September 11, 1997
Clockwork Knight: Pepperouchau no Fukubukuro	Sega	Sega	Unreleased	Unreleased	December 15, 1995
Cubic Gallery	We Net	We Net	Unreleased	Unreleased	May 17, 1996
Daina Airan: Yokoku Hen	Game Arts	Game Arts	Unreleased	Unreleased	December 27, 1996
Daisenryaku Pack	Sega	Sega	Unreleased	Unreleased	December 13, 1996
Derby Analyst	Media Entertainment	Media Entertainment	Unreleased	Unreleased	May 30, 1997
Devil Summoner: Soul Hackers - Akuma Zensho 2	Atlus	Atlus	Unreleased	Unreleased	December 23, 1997
Disc Station Bessatsu: I Miss You. Tanaka Katsumi	Compile	Compile	Unreleased	Unreleased	October 30, 1997
Dream Square Hinagata Akiko	Video System	Video System	Unreleased	Unreleased	February 14, 1997
EMIT Value Set	Koei	Koei	Unreleased	Unreleased	December 15, 1995
EVE Burst Error & Desire Value Pack	C's Ware	Imadio	Unreleased	Unreleased	February 26, 1998
EVE Burst Error & EVE: The Lost One Value Pack	C's Ware	Imadio	Unreleased	Unreleased	July 2, 1998
EVE: The Lost One & Desire Value Pack	C's Ware	Imadio	Unreleased	Unreleased	May 7, 1998
Falcom Classics Collection	Nihon Falcom	JVC	Unreleased	Unreleased	March 4, 1999
Find Love 2: The Prologue	F Creative Factory; Lyceen	Daiki	Unreleased	Unreleased	June 4, 1998
GAME BASIC for SEGASATURN	Bits Laboratory	ASCII	Unreleased	Unreleased	June 25, 1998
Ginga Ojousama Densetsu Yuna: Mika Akitaka Illust Works	Red Company	Hudson Soft	Unreleased	Unreleased	December 27, 1996
Ginga Ojousama Densetsu Yuna: Mika Akitaka Illust Works 2	Red Company	Hudson Soft	Unreleased	Unreleased	December 15, 1997
Hideyoshi Nobunaga Set	Koei	Koei	Unreleased	Unreleased	November 29, 1996
Idol Janshi Suchie-Pai Secret Album	Jaleco	Jaleco	Unreleased	Unreleased	March 18, 1999
Isto é Zico: Zico no Kangaeru Soccer	Mizuki	Mizuki	Unreleased	Unreleased	March 22, 1996
Kamen Rider: Sakusen File 1	Access	Toei Video	Unreleased	Unreleased	November 13, 1997
Kekkon Zenya	Bits Laboratory	Shogakukan Production	Unreleased	Unreleased	October 27, 1995
Kidō Senshi Gundam Gaiden: The Blue Destiny	BEC; Studio Orphee	Bandai	Unreleased	Unreleased	August 29, 1997
Kidō Senshi Gundam: Gihren no Yabō Kôryaku Sireisyo	CRI	Bandai	Unreleased	Unreleased	October 8, 1998
The King of Fighters '96 + '95: Gentei KOF Double Pack	SNK	SNK	Unreleased	Unreleased	December 31, 1996
The King of Fighters Best Collection	SNK	SNK	Unreleased	Unreleased	October 1, 1998
Langrisser Tribute	Career Soft	Masaya	Unreleased	Unreleased	December 23, 1998
Legend of K-1 The Best Collection	Pony Canyon	Pony Canyon	Unreleased	Unreleased	January 24, 1997
Legend of K-1 Grand Prix '96	Pony Canyon	Pony Canyon	Unreleased	Unreleased	April 18, 1997
Lulu	System Sacom	Sega	Unreleased	Unreleased	November 1, 1996
Lupin the 3rd: Chronicles	Spike	Spike	Unreleased	Unreleased	August 8, 1997
Lupin the 3rd: The Master File	Mizuki	Mizuki	Unreleased	Unreleased	March 29, 1996
The Making of Nightruth	Sonnet Computer Entertainment	Sonnet Computer Entertainment	Unreleased	Unreleased	June 28, 1996
Making of Nightruth II: Voice Selection	Sonnet Computer Entertainment	Sonnet Computer Entertainment	Unreleased	Unreleased	November 8, 1996
Media ROMancer Daisuke Asakura	Fun House	Fun House	Unreleased	Unreleased	March 1, 1996
Message Navi	SIMS	SIMS	Unreleased	Unreleased	November 27, 1997
Message Navi Vol. 2	SIMS	SIMS	Unreleased	Unreleased	February 26, 1998
Chisato Moritaka Watarasebashi / Lala Sunshine	Oracion	Sega	Unreleased	Unreleased	September 11, 1997
NetLink Game Pack (Note: Includes a NetLink Custom Web Browser, Sega Rally Championship Plus NetLink Edition, and Virtual On: Cyber Troopers NetLink Edition.)	Sega AM3; CRI	Sega	August 15, 1997	Unreleased	Unreleased
Nightruth Voice Selection: Radio Drama Hen	Sonnet Computer Entertainment	Sonnet Computer Entertainment	Unreleased	Unreleased	March 14, 1997
Okudera Yasuhiko no Sekai o Mezase! Soccer Kids: Nyuumon Hen	Japan Media Programming	Fujitsu Parex	Unreleased	Unreleased	September 27, 1996
Panzer Dragoon I & II	Team Andromeda	Sega	Unreleased	Unreleased	December 13, 1996
Playboy Karaoke Collection: Volume 1	Vic Tokai	Vic Tokai	Unreleased	Unreleased	August 9, 1996
Playboy Karaoke Collection: Volume 2	Vic Tokai	Vic Tokai	Unreleased	Unreleased	August 9, 1996
Private Idol Disc Data-Hen Race Queen F	Sada Soft	Sada Soft	Unreleased	Unreleased	December 27, 1996
Private Idol Disc Data-Hen Race Queen G	Sada Soft	Sada Soft	Unreleased	Unreleased	January 29, 1997
Private Idol Disc Tokubetsu-hen Campaign Girl '97	Sada Soft	Sada Soft	Unreleased	Unreleased	June 20, 1997
Private Idol Disc Tokubetsu-hen CosPlayers	Sada Soft	Sada Soft	Unreleased	Unreleased	November 29, 1996
Private Idol Disc Tokubetsu-hen Kogal Dai-hyakka 100	Sada Soft	Sada Soft	Unreleased	Unreleased	April 25, 1997
Private Idol Disc Vol. 1: Kinoshita Yuu	Sada Soft	Sada Soft	Unreleased	Unreleased	July 26, 1996
Private Idol Disc Vol. 2: Uchiyama Miki	Sada Soft	Sada Soft	Unreleased	Unreleased	August 30, 1996
Private Idol Disc Vol. 3: Ooshima Akemi	Sada Soft	Sada Soft	Unreleased	Unreleased	September 27, 1996
Private Idol Disc Vol. 4: Kuroda Mirei	Sada Soft	Sada Soft	Unreleased	Unreleased	June 27, 1997
Private Idol Disc Vol. 5: Fujisaki Nanako	Sada Soft	Sada Soft	Unreleased	Unreleased	August 8, 1997
Private Idol Disc Vol. 6: Yoshida Satomi	Sada Soft	Sada Soft	Unreleased	Unreleased	September 25, 1997
Private Idol Disc Vol. 7: Asou Kaori	Sada Soft	Sada Soft	Unreleased	Unreleased	November 20, 1997
Private Idol Disc Vol. 8: Furukawa Emiko	Sada Soft	Sada Soft	Unreleased	Unreleased	November 27, 1997
Private Idol Disc Vol. 9: Nagamatsu Keiko	Sada Soft	Sada Soft	Unreleased	Unreleased	December 4, 1997
Private Idol Disc Vol. 10: Masaki Mai	Sada Soft	Sada Soft	Unreleased	Unreleased	December 11, 1997
Private Idol Disc Vol. 11: Hirose Mayumi	Sada Soft	Sada Soft	Unreleased	Unreleased	December 18, 1997
Puzzle Bobble 2X & Space Invaders	Taito	Taito	Unreleased	Unreleased	April 4, 1997
Real Bout Garō Densetsu Best Collection	SNK; Yumekobo	SNK	Unreleased	Unreleased	August 6, 1998
Roommate Complete Box: Ryōko Inoue	Datam Polystar	Datam Polystar	Unreleased	Unreleased	March 16, 2000
Ryouri no Tetsujin: Kitchen Stadium Tour	Scitron & Art	Hakuhodo	Unreleased	Unreleased	February 23, 1996
Sakura Taisen Hanagumi Tsuushin	Sega; Red Company	Sega	Unreleased	Unreleased	February 14, 1997
Sakura Taisen Jouki Radio Show	Sega; Red Company	Sega	Unreleased	Unreleased	November 13, 1997
Samurai Spirits Best Collection	SIMS; SNK	SNK	Unreleased	Unreleased	August 6, 1998
Saturn Music School	Success; Waka Manufacturing	Waka Manufacturing	Unreleased	Unreleased	August 9, 1997
Saturn Music School 2	Success; Waka Manufacturing	Waka Manufacturing	Unreleased	Unreleased	July 30, 1998
Sega Ages Volume 1^{PAL} Sega Ages^{NA}	Sega AM2; Rutubo Games	Sega^{PAL} Spaz^{NA}	November 7, 1997	December 19, 1996	Unreleased
Sekai no Shasou kara I Swiss-hen: Alps Tozantetsudou no Tabi	Fujitsu	Fujitsu	Unreleased	Unreleased	December 6, 1996
Sentimental Graffiti: First Window	Cybelle	NEC Interchannel	Unreleased	Unreleased	April 11, 1997
Shin Megami Tensei: Devil Summoner - Akuma Zensho	Atlus	Atlus	Unreleased	Unreleased	April 26, 1996
Sotsugyō Album	Westone	Shogakukan Production	Unreleased	Unreleased	January 15, 1998
SS Adventure Pack: Nanatsu no Hikan & Myst	Koei; Sunsoft	Koei	Unreleased	Unreleased	March 28, 1997
Special Gift Pack (Note: Includes the games Bishōjo Variety Game: Rapyulus Panic and Tsuukai!! Slot Shooting.)	Shōeisha	Shōeisha	Unreleased	Unreleased	November 8, 1996
Techno Motor	Denshi Media Services	Denshi Media Services	Unreleased	Unreleased	March 26, 1998
Tenchi Muyou! Ryououki Gokuraku CD-ROM for Sega Saturn	Yumedia	Yumedia	Unreleased	Unreleased	September 29, 1995
Ultraman Zukan	Kodansha	Kodansha	Unreleased	Unreleased	September 13, 1996
Ultraman Zukan 2	Kodansha	Kodansha	Unreleased	Unreleased	December 18, 1997
Ultraman Zukan 3	Kodansha	Kodansha	Unreleased	Unreleased	June 18, 1998
Value Set Series: Nobunaga no Yabō: Tenshōki & Nobunaga no Yabō Returns	Koei	Koei	Unreleased	Unreleased	February 21, 1997
Value Set Series: Sangokushi V & Sangokushi Returns	Koei	Koei	Unreleased	Unreleased	February 21, 1997
Virtua Cop Special Pack	Sega AM2	Sega	Unreleased	Unreleased	February 19, 1998
Virtua Fighter CG Portrait Series Vol. 1 Sarah Bryant	Sega AM2	Sega	Unreleased	Unreleased	October 13, 1995
Virtua Fighter CG Portrait Series Vol. 2 Jack Bryant	Sega AM2	Sega	Unreleased	Unreleased	October 13, 1995
Virtua Fighter CG Portrait Series Vol. 3 Akira Yuki	Sega AM2	Sega	Unreleased	Unreleased	November 17, 1995
Virtua Fighter CG Portrait Series Vol. 4 Pai Chan	Sega AM2	Sega	Unreleased	Unreleased	November 17, 1995
Virtua Fighter CG Portrait Series Vol. 5 Wolf Hawkfield	Sega AM2	Sega	Unreleased	Unreleased	December 8, 1995
Virtua Fighter CG Portrait Series Vol. 6 Lau Chan	Sega AM2	Sega	Unreleased	Unreleased	December 8, 1995
Virtua Fighter CG Portrait Series Vol. 7 Shun Di	Sega AM2	Sega	Unreleased	Unreleased	January 26, 1996
Virtua Fighter CG Portrait Series Vol. 8 Lion Rafale	Sega AM2	Sega	Unreleased	Unreleased	January 26, 1996
Virtua Fighter CG Portrait Series Vol. 9 Kage Maru	Sega AM2	Sega	Unreleased	Unreleased	March 1, 1996
Virtua Fighter CG Portrait Series Vol. 10 Jeffry McWild	Sega AM2	Sega	Unreleased	Unreleased	March 1, 1996
Virtua Fighter CG Portrait Series The Final Dural	Sega AM2	Sega	Unreleased	Unreleased	March 1, 1996
Yoshiyuki Sadamoto Illustrations	CSK Research Institute	Gainax	Unreleased	Unreleased	November 27, 1997
Yûkyû Gensôkyoku Hozonban Perpetual Collection	Starlight Marry	MediaWorks	Unreleased	Unreleased	December 7, 2000
Yūkyū no Kobako: Official Collection	Starlight Marry	MediaWorks	Unreleased	Unreleased	December 11, 1997

== See also ==
- List of cancelled Sega Saturn games
