= Masudaya =

Japanese toy manufacturer

Masudaya, also known as Masudaya Modern Toys, is a Japanese toy maker that became known as a leading builder of mechanical and battery operated toys in the post-World War II era. Its longevity may in part be due to its involvement in the early days of the airsoft boom during the early 1980s. The company is known for essentially creating the "skirmishable" airsoft gun. It was first to design airsoft guns for use in combat simulation as opposed to backyard target shooting.

Masudaya normally identifies its toys using the M-T, or Modern Toys logo. Most of the guns it produced, particularly the TradeMark series, are extremely rare. The Detachable series are the most common, followed by the Bolt series. Many sources in the airsoft community in Hong Kong and Japan believe there are only a handful of each version of TradeMark guns still extant. Masudaya guns can be seen packaged either as Masudaya or TradeMark; for example, some version of the Thunderbolt display "TradeMark" on the box and others only "Masudaya." Beyond its airsoft products, Masudaya's robot and space-themed toys have been auctioned by high-profile auction houses.

== Products ==
Masudaya has produced hundreds of toys through the years, many of them vintage wind-up or battery-operated tin toys, in addition to the following Airsoft replicas:

- Assembly Rifle
- SWAT Shotgun
- Minuteman-10 Rifle
- ZAP-20 Rifle
- Recoiler Sniper Rifle

BS Buffalo and Detachable series

- Buffalo SS Rifle (sold under tradeMark sometimes)
- Detachable SS-2
- Detachable SS-2 Briefcase
- Detachable SS-02
- Detachable SS-3
- Detachable SS-3 Briefcase
- Detachable SS-03
- Detachable SS-4
- Detachable SS-4 Briefcase
- Detachable SS-5
- Detachable SS-5 Briefcase
- Detachable SS-100
- Detachable SS-200

Bolt series

- Bolt 888
- Bolt 888 MK2
- Thunderbolt
- Urchin M16

Masudaya also produced a small line of guns under their "TradeMark Air Guns" name. These guns included:

- Luger MS-1
- Walther P38 MS-1
- Magnum MS-1
- Falcon-077
- Falcon GV-078

Handheld LCD games

Early 80s, Masudaya produced several LCD handheld electronic games under the Play&Time brand, including Cat and Mice or Shogun, among others.
