= G-Mode =

Japanese video game company

G-Mode Corporation
- Type: Subsidiary
- Industry: Video games
- Founded: June 14, 2006; 20 years ago (Note: G-Mode Co., Ltd founded on July 27, 2000)
- Headquarters: Tokyo, Japan
- Key people: Keiji Araki (representative director)
- Number of employees: 190
- Parent: Marvelous
- Website: gmodecorp.com

G-Mode Corporation (株式会社ジー・モード, Kabushikigaisha Jī Mōdo) is a Japanese company that specializes in games for Java-compatible mobile phones. The company also licenses content for mobile telecommunications operators, as well as being involved in the original equipment manufacturing of mobile phone games.

== History ==
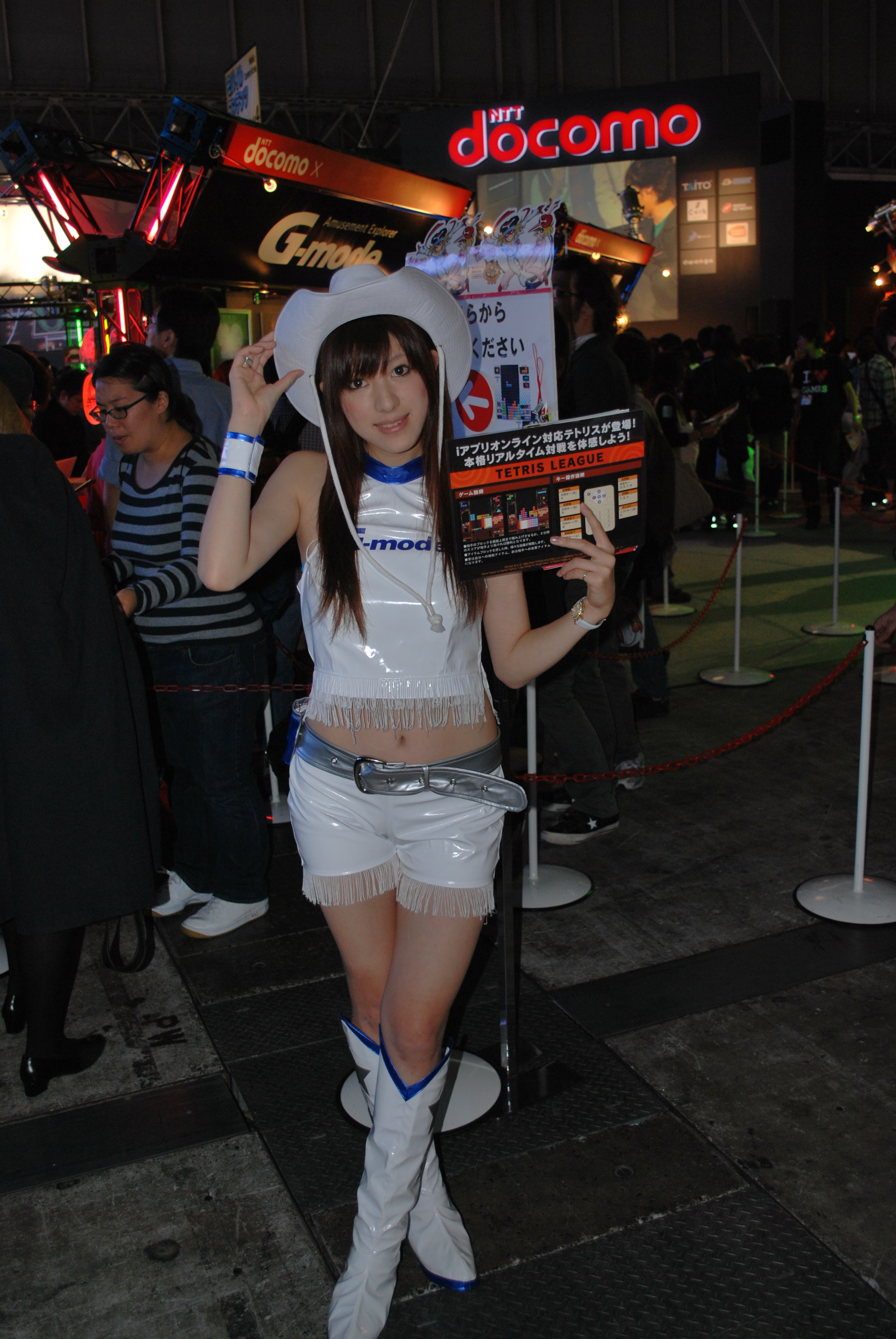
Promotion at the Tokyo Game Show 2008

G-Mode Co., Ltd was founded in July 2000 and merged in March 2014 with ONE-UP Co., Ltd. (a corporation established in 2006) which became G-Mode Corporation. G-Mode is headquartered in Tokyo.

G-Mode saw the potential in mobile gaming and managed to obtain the rights to Tetris in Japan in 2001, and currently uses this license to remain a major player in the mobile entertainment industry in Japan. In 2004, G-Mode acquired the back catalogue of Data East Corporation. In 2005, GungHo Online Entertainment invested in the company. They currently license out these Data East titles on the Wii Virtual Console, Gametap, and Mobile Platform. G-Mode released an official Data East website in December 2008. In 2010, it was revealed that the company would publish several Data East titles on the Zeebo console in Brazil and Mexico. On March 1, 2012, after several years of Wii Virtual Console support, G-Mode delisted all of its PC Engine/TurboGrafix-16 games from the service while continuing with the ones originally released on Nintendo consoles.

== Business ==
G-Mode Co. Ltd. reported earnings results for the fiscal year 2006. For the fiscal year, the company reported consolidated net profit of $440,700, a $1.7 million consolidated recurring profit, and a $31.1 million consolidated revenue. The number of subscribers to official websites for NTT DoCoMo handsets rose to 1.48 million at the end of October 2006, up 34% from the end of March 2006, which mainly contributed to the upward revision. The company revised its earnings guidance for the fiscal year 2007. For the period, the company revises consolidated net profit to $594,000 from a previous forecast of a $169,500 consolidated net loss. Consolidated recurring profit was revised up to $2.8 million from $1.7 million. The consolidated sales revenue was revised up as well to $41.1 million from $39.8 million.

== G-Mode Archives ==
In April 2020, G-Mode announced that several old mobile games from the company made in the 2000s will be re-released on Nintendo Switch through the G-MODE Archives label. Following the success of such re-releases, G-Mode announced G-MODE Archives+, which consists of re-releases of third-party mobile games, starting with Detective Ryosuke Akikawa Case Tan Vol.1 "Masked Illusion Murder Case" by Genki. The G-MODE Archives series debuted on Steam in 2021.

== Data East games rightsholder ==
G-Mode owns the rights to more than 100 Data East titles. The following list mostly includes video games mentioned either on G-Mode's original Data East webpage in 2009 or the current version launched in 2017. In some instances, a game can be absent in both of G-Mode's Data East webpages but still be mentioned here if there's a third-party source proving the company's ownership for it (in such cases the reference will be attached next to the title). Although G-Mode published in 2007 a remake of Data East's Super Famicom title Heracles no Eikō III: Kamigami no Chinmoku for mobile phones, this title is not included in the following list because that license is owned by Paon Corporation.

- Act-Fancer: Cybernetick Hyper Weapon
- B-Wings
- Bad Dudes vs. DragonNinja
- Bloody Wolf / Battle Rangers
- Boogie Wings / The Great Rag Time Show
- BreakThru
- Bump 'n' Jump / Burnin' Rubber
- BurgerTime / Hamburger
- Burger Time Deluxe
- Caveman Games / Caveman Ugh-Lympics
- China Town
- Cobra Command / Thunder Storm (1984 laserdisc game)
- Cobra Command (1988 side-scroller)
- Congo's Caper
- Daikaijyu Deburasu
- Dark Lord
- Dark Seal
- Darwin 4078
- Desert Assault / Desert Storm Gulf War / Thunder Zone
- Double Wings
- Drop Off
- Dunk Dream 95 / Hoops 96
- Edward Randy
- Express Raider / Western Express
- Fighter's History
- Fighter's History Dynamite / Karnov's Revenge
- Fighter's History: Mizoguchi Kiki Ippatsu!!
- Fire Trap
- Gate of Doom / Dark Seal
- Ghostlop
- Golf Club: Birdie Rush
- Gondomania
- Gun Ball
- Heavy Barrel
- High Seas Havoc
- Hippodrome
- Joe & Mac: Caveman Ninja
- Joe & Mac 2: Lost in the Tropics / Joe & Mac 3: Lost in the Tropics
- Joe & Mac Returns
- Kamikaze Cabbie
- Karate Champ
- Last Mission
- Liberation
- Little Magic
- Lock 'n' Chase
- Locked 'N Loaded
- Mad Alien / Mad Rider / Highway Chase
- Magical Drop
- Magical Drop II
- Magical Drop III / Magical Drop Pocket
- Magical Drop F
- Makai Hakkenden Shada
- Manhattan
- Metal Clash
- Midnight Resistance
- Motteke Oh! Dorobou
- Mutant Fighter / Death Brade
- Mysterious Stone
- Night Slashers
- Nitro Ball
- Outlaws of the Lost Dynasty / Suiko Enbu
- Override
- Peter Pepper's Ice Cream Factory
- Pro Bowling
- Pro Soccer
- Pro Tennis
- Psycho-Nics Oscar
- Ring King (Note: Ring King is included in the Data East All Star Collection compilation released in 2017 and officially licensed by G-Mode. But it has been suggested in the past that Bandai Namco Entertainment may be the actual copyright holder of the game. Ring King was originally published in North America by Data East and in Japan by Namco, predecessors of G-Mode and Bandai Namco respectively.)
- Road Blaster / Road Avenger / Turbo Blaster
- Scrum Try
- Shackled
- Shoot Out
- Side Pocket
- Side Pocket 2 / Minnesota Fats: Pool Legend
- Side Pocket 3
- Silent Debuggers
- Sly Spy / Sly Spy: Secret Agent / Secret Agent
- Soccer League - Winner's Cup
- Spinmaster / Miracle Adventure
- SRD: Super Real Darwin
- Street Slam / Dunk Dream / Street Hoop
- Suiko Enbu: Fuunsaiki
- Super Birdie Rush
- Super BurgerTime
- Tattoo Assassins
- Treasure Island
- Trio the Punch
- Tumblepop
- Two Crude / Crude Buster (Two Crude Dudes (MD / GEN port))
- Winning Shot
- Wizard Fire / Dark Seal II
- Wonder Planet
- World Grand-Prix - Pole To Finish
- Zaviga

=== Not owned by G-Mode ===
- Chelnov (purchased by Paon DP)
- Glory of Heracles (purchased by Paon DP)
- Karnov (purchased by Paon DP)
- Metal Max (purchased by Cattle Call, later Kadokawa Games)
- Jake Hunter (purchased by WorkJam, later by Arc System Works)
- RoboCop and RoboCop 2 (Arcade, NES and DOS versions, purchased by D4 Enterprise)
- Rohga: Armor Force (purchased by Paon DP)
- Skull Fang (purchased by Paon DP)
- Vapor Trail: Hyper Offence Formation (purchased by Paon DP)
- Windjammers (purchased by Paon DP)
