= The Cliffhanger: Edward Randy =

1990 video game

- Developer: Data East
- Publisher: Data East
- Producer: Minoru Sano
- Designer: Hiro Nakamura
- Programmers: Hidemi Hamada; Shinji Hirao
- Artists: Chie Kitahara; Fujimi Ōnishi; Hitomi Fujiwara
- Composer: Akira Takemoto
- Platform: Arcade
- Release: WW: November 1990
- Genre: Action
- Modes: Single-player, multiplayer

The Cliffhanger: Edward Randy, also known as simply Edward Randy, (Note: Japanese: エドワード・ランディ, Hepburn: Edowādo Randi) is a 1990 action video game developed and published by Data East for arcades. Set during the 1930s in a European region, where an elderly scientist escapes from a Nazi-like army under the leadership of general "Dark Ogre" after being manipulated for his research on a secret mass destruction weapon, players assume the role of Edward Randy on an adventure to rescue the scientist's granddaughter Charlotte, who holds a prism stone that is a key piece for the enemy. Headed by Terra Diver producer Minoru Sano, the game was created by most of the same team that would later work on several projects at Data East. It was influenced by films such as Indiana Jones as well as manga and anime such as Lupin the Third.

The title was met with mostly positive reception from critics and players alike, earning awards from Gamest magazine, but it did not sell enough units during its run worldwide. Conversions for multiple systems were planned but never released. The rights to the title are currently owned by G-Mode.

== Gameplay ==
Gameplay screenshot

The Cliffhanger: Edward Randy is an action game where players assume the role of Edward Randy across seven stages fighting against Nazi-like soldiers led by the general "Dark Ogre" in order to rescue Charlotte, who holds a prism stone that is key to the enemy's secret mass destruction weapon. Players control Edward using an eight-way joystick and two buttons for attacking and jumping respectively. Edward attacks using a whip in eight directions depending on the direction pressed on the joystick. Edward can also slide on the ground when the jump button is pressed while holding the joystick sideways or diagonally. Pressing the joystick diagonally upwards causes Edward to run, while pressing down on the joystick in the air allows him to stomp enemies on the ground. Edward can also perform a spin-attack by looping their whip left or right on certain objects. There are no lives in the game and Edward's remaining health is directly linked to the number of points gained by players on each stage. Players can revive Edward's health by defeating enemies but points are lost when hit by enemies.

== Synopsis ==
The Cliffhanger: Edward Randy takes place during the 1930s in an unspecified European country. Research on a secret weapon of mass destruction was being conducted in this country under the leadership of a fearsome Nazi-like army general, the "Dark Ogre", but an elderly scientist decides to escape after learning that he was being manipulated by the general. The scientist gives the key piece of his research, a prism stone, to his granddaughter Charlotte as he escapes and the general pursues the prism with the full force of his army. Charlotte takes refuge in the home of Edward Randy, a teenage boy who was preparing for his first date in half a year with his girlfriend Jennifer, as Edward suddenly finds himself in the midst of a huge adventure involving a dangerous plan to destroy the world.

== Development ==
The Cliffhanger: Edward Randy was created by most of the same team that would later work on several projects at Data East, with members of the staff recounting the project's development process and history through various Japanese publications. Its development was helmed by Terra Diver producer Minoru Sano, with Hiro Nakamura acting as designer. Hidemi Hamada and Shinji Hirao served as co-programmer while Chie Kitahara, Fujimi Ōnishi, Hitomi Fujiwara and several other artists were in charge of creating the pixel art. The sound design was handled by Gamadelic members Akira Takemoto, who composed the soundtrack, and Hiroaki Yoshida, who created the sound effects.

The Cliffhanger: Edward Randy was conceived as an experimental action project featuring an Indiana Jones-like character in conjunction with Joe & Mac and a sequel to Karate Champ, with Nakamura stating that Edward Randy was the first project he was in charge and proved difficult to be approved. Nakamura originally wanted to develop a shoot 'em up title, as he was a fan of the genre, however, Data East told him that one was already in production by one of his co-worker, which later became Boogie Wings. Due to lack of experience with fighting games, Nakamura passed over Karate Champ 2 and was left with Edward Randy, as another of his co-workers was assigned to Joe & Mac. During the planning phase, staff members introduced their favorite things into the game design document that read like a sequel to Indiana Jones, however it took time and proved troublesome for the team to implement what they wanted, in addition of balancing issues with the whip attack and its use to move across causing internal issues. Nakamura was told that creating such project was deemed impossible and was nearly scrapped, with one of his co-workers from Boogie Wings questioning Data East over their decision of cancelling Edward Randy at the planning phase. However, Nakamura was told to make a sample and the project became a game once the artist drew some graphics.

When creating The Cliffhanger: Edward Randy's cinematic-style presentation, the team were influenced by films and one staff member stated that no other game at the time captured the cinematic feeling. In addition to Indiana Jones, the game was also influenced by manga and anime such as Lupin the Third, as one of the character designers was a fan of Lupin; Randy's character design took cues from Arsène Lupin III, such as the way he runs bowlegged. Edward Randy also contains parodies or homages to works by Hayao Miyazaki and Buster Keaton. When making the pseudo-3D visuals, one staff member came with the idea of swapping backgrounds on the fly during the flight, while the team were working with rectangular pixels instead of square pixels for sprites, which were not working properly and the graphics looked warped as a result, prompting to manually draw all animations for various objects from scratch. Nakamura claimed Data East wanted a second player character for revenue, which was added by the art staff. Nakamura also claimed that the printed circuit board used for the game contained "five times" the memory size than previous releases from Data East.

The Cliffhanger: Edward Randy lasted a year in development and barely made its deadline, with Nakamura stating he was told by Data East to stop and finish production, with one team member claiming he overworked between two and three days prior to its showcase at the 1991 AM Show. Despite development issues, former Data East members have regarded Edward Randy as the project they had most fun working on.

== Release ==
Edward Randy was released in arcades by Data East across Japan, Europe and North America in November 1990. In North America, it was released under the title Edward Randy, as seen in a Data East USA brochure and RePlay magazine.

In 1991, Elite Systems acquired the license to convert Edward Randy across multiple platforms including the Amiga, Atari ST, Commodore 64 and PC for an early Spring 1992 release, however they were never released. A Sega Saturn conversion was under development by Xing Entertainment and scheduled for a 1997 launch but it was never released. After being impressed with their work on Gauntlet IV, Sega asked M2 if they wanted to develop a Game Gear project, with M2 president Naoki Horii stating in a 2016 interview that the company wanted to port Edward Randy but they were handed with Gunstar Heroes. As of July 2025, it has not received a conversion to conventional home consoles. On July 17, 2025, it was announced that The Cliffhanger: Edward Randy would appear on the Taito Egret II Mini Arcade Collection Part 1, marking the first time the title has received a conversion of any kind.

== Reception ==
Reception

Review scores
| Publication | Score |
|---|---|
| Computer and Video Games | 82% |
| Beep! MegaDrive | 3 stars |

Award
| Publication | Award |
|---|---|
| Gamest Mook (1998) | Grand Prize 6th, Best Action Award 3rd, Best Performance Award 2nd, Best VGM Award 9th |

According to Hiro Nakamura, The Cliffhanger: Edward Randy sold 4,000 arcade units worldwide, including 2,000 units in Japan and 2,000 units overseas. However, it sold below expectations and was a commercial failure. In Japan, Game Machine listed the title on their 1 March 1991 issue as being the fourth most-successful table arcade unit of the month.

Computer and Video Games's Julian Rignall scored the game with an overall 82% rating. Both John Cook and Mike Pattenden of CU Amiga praised the hand-drawn visuals. French magazine Tilt gave it a positive outlook. Zzap!64 praised its visuals, sound design and action. AllGame's Jason Rhoades rated it with a 2 out of 5 stars ranking. Retro Gamer gave it an overall positive retrospective outlook. Former Treasure designer Tetsuhiko "Han" Kikuchi was a fan of the game, naming the characters Edward M. Cognac and Randy M. Green in Guardian Heroes after the former's main protagonist. Hardcore Gaming 101's Kurt Kalata stated that "As unpolished as the action is, Edward Randy is still a must play for anyone infatuated with 2D graphics. It's clearly a title ahead of its time, and it feels a bit like a Treasure game before Treasure truly existed."
