= Sly Spy =

1989 video game

- North American arcade flyer
- Developer: Data East
- Publisher: Data East
- Designers: Makoto Kikuchi; Kazuhiro Takayama, Kenichi Fujimoto, Osapan (hardware)
- Programmers: Tac.H; Umanosuke; Hinsyuku Man
- Artists: Dot Man; Kim; Marukin; Sin; Shinichi Kanamori; Jun; Tomo Adachi; Magurin Warrior
- Composers: Azusa Hara; Hiroaki Yoshida (Arcade); Tim Follin (Amiga); Geoff Follin (Amiga, C64)
- Platforms: Arcade, Amiga, Amstrad CPC, Atari ST, Commodore 64, ZX Spectrum, Switch, Evercade
- Release: 1989
- Genre: Run and gun
- Modes: Single-player, multiplayer

Sly Spy, known in Japan as Secret Agent (シークレット・エージェント, Shīkuretto Ējento) and known in Europe as Sly Spy: Secret Agent, is an arcade video game developed by Data East and published in 1989. Despite not being a licensed James Bond game, Sly Spy contains references to the series.

After Data East became defunct following their bankruptcy in 2003, G-Mode bought the intellectual rights to the arcade game as well as most other Data East games and licenses.

== Plot ==
Sometime during the nineties, the president and his wife attend to a ceremony at the White House in Washington, D.C., greeting and waving to the crowd, when terrorists, armed and dangerous, some of them using jetpacks, come by close. The screen goes red and gunshots can be heard, in what seems to be an assassination attempt against them both.

Hours after the incident, a secret agent (whose code number can be determined by the player at the very start of the game) is informed that a massive wave of terrorists is invading the city by all sides. They belong to "Council for World Domination" (CWD), a secret underground syndicate very reminiscent of SPECTRE from the Bond movies. The invasion of the city is just their first move on their campaign to take over the world.

Assigned with the mission of stopping CWD at all costs, the agent plunges from the jet, fighting enemies mid-air as he parachutes towards the city. His battle will also take him on a bike chase around the highways, through a harbor, a warehouse and even underwater, all this as he rushes to CWD's secret base to stop nuclear missiles from launching and striking cities such as Paris, London and Tokyo.

Should players reach CWD's hideout, they will climb a missile silo, having to fight some of the game's bosses again. If they succeed, they will face the syndicate's unnamed leader. He doesn't jump, attack or does anything else; His only defense is a force field, but this doesn't mean a easy fight, either, since a spike trap slowly descends from above, killing players instantly on a single touch if they don't shoot or kick it fast enough to bust through.

After a tough time, the agent finally busts the field and puts an end to the commander. CWD is done for and their leader is finally history.

Shortly after, the president (who somehow survived the attack at the beginning of the game, although it is not mentioned if the first-lady also made it or not) congratulates the agent for saving the planet, but also mocks him: "You missed a few things. Better go back and get them!"

These "things" reveal to be the president's young daughters, playfully posing with him for a photo as they shower the hero with kisses in retribution, although he doesn't seem to be happy with the occasion overall.

The adventure ends with the hero and his girls driving off to a well-deserved vacation in his Ferrari F40.

== Gameplay ==
Arcade screenshot

Players control a secret agent through eight different stages of varying gamelay. At the start of the game, players shoot enemies horizontally while sky-diving. The second half of the first, third, fifth, sixth and eighth stages are played in a run and gun format similar to Namco's Rolling Thunder and its sequels, but it lacks the ability to jump between the top and bottom floors while grabbing rails. Also, when out of ammo or attacked by a boss with one hit, Sly Spy drops his firearm while the game becomes a beat'em up in 2D platform manner, much like Shinobi. Players can make Sly Spy do three different kicks: high kicks, low kicks and jump kicks. The second stage shows Sly Spy riding on his motorcycle with a built-in machine gun, which makes this stage a combination of run-and-gun and vehicular combat games. The fourth and seventh stages are in marine-based, side-scrolling shooter format. Minor enemies drop several different items when defeated, such as extra ammo, cans of Coca-Cola-esque soda and machine guns. Sometimes, enemies will drop a jetpack on land or a DPV while underwater to make transportation easier.

Enemies also drop parts of the ultimate weapon in the game called the Golden Gun, which functions nearly the same way as the Cobra Gun in Data East's 1988 RoboCop arcade game and the Heavy Barrel energy cannon from the arcade game of the same name. It is also shaped like a rifle instead of a pistol; when the Golden Gun is equipped along with either the motorcycle or a DPV, their built-in firearms will shoot the same energy bolts shot from the Golden Gun itself.

== Ports ==
The game was ported to several home systems. Ocean Software ported it to the Amiga (with completely different background music composed by Tim Follin), Amstrad CPC, Commodore 64, Atari ST and ZX Spectrum in 1990 exclusively in Europe, while Data East released Ocean's Commodore 64 version in North America in 1990.

== Reception ==
Reception

Award
| Publication | Award |
|---|---|
| Sinclair User | SU Classic |

In Japan, Game Machine listed Sly Spy on their August 15, 1989 issue as being the fifth most-successful table arcade unit of the month.

== Legacy ==
Several references from Data East's other arcade games made cameo appearances in Sly Spy. A poster showing Chelnov (a.k.a. Atomic Runner) can be seen at the beginning of Stage 3, the logo for the aforementioned Bad Dudes can be seen at the end of Stage 3, and a poster showing Karnov can be seen at the beginning of Stage 5. In the 1990 film RoboCop 2, officer Duffy gets pushed by RoboCop into a Bad Dudes arcade cabinet, but with Sly Spy built into it. Along with a few other Data East arcade games, they appeared in the film due to licensing and advertising agreements between Orion Pictures, Data East and Ocean Software after the release of two video games based on the RoboCop property.

In 2010, G-Mode and G1M2 added the arcade game to Data East Arcade Classics as Secret Agent.

In 2018, it was released on the Nintendo Switch as part of Johnny Turbo's Arcade.

In 2021, it was released as part of Data East Arcade 1 on the Evercade.
