= SoftAid =

1985 video game compilation

Soft Aid
- Advert showing the cover artwork by David Rowe.
- Publisher: Quicksilva
- Platforms: Commodore 64, ZX Spectrum
- Release: March 1985

SoftAid is a software compilation, released by Quicksilva in March 1985 to support the Famine Relief in Ethiopia. The software was released on cassette for the ZX Spectrum and Commodore 64 home computers. Versions were also planned for the Amstrad CPC and BBC Micro but Rod Cousens, Quicksilva's managing director, was unable to secure enough games from publishers.

An audio recording of the charity single, "Do They Know It's Christmas?" by Band Aid is also featured on one side of the tape.

The tape was unusual in that it was the first time software houses had co-operated to produce a product to support a charity.

The tape was sold in the United Kingdom for £4.99.

== Games included ==
=== ZX Spectrum ===
- Spellbound
- Starbike
- Kokotoni Wilf
- The Pyramid
- Horace Goes Skiing
- Gilligan's Gold
- Ant Attack
- 3D Tank Duel
- Jack and the Beanstalk
- Sorcery

=== Commodore 64 ===
- Gumshoe
- Beamrider
- Star Trader
- Kokotoni Wilf
- China Miner
- Gilligan's Gold
- Fred
- Gyropod
- Falcon Patrol
- Flak

== Reception ==
SoftAid topped the UK software sales charts for seventeen weeks in 1985, setting a record for the longest number of consecutive weeks at number one. The record was eventually broken by RoboCop in 1989.

The compilation raised over £360,000 for the Band Aid Trust and in 1986 CRASH magazine reported that it was probably the highest selling software release ever.

== Legacy ==
SoftAid was followed in 1986 by another ten game compilation, Off The Hook, which was also organised by Rod Cousens who had then moved to Electric Dreams Software. It was released to support the Prince's Trust work on drug abuse rehabilitation with versions available for the Commodore 64 and ZX Spectrum. In 1987, Cousens worked with Gremlin Graphics to produce the Kidsplay compilation. Released for the Amstrad CPC as well as the Commodore 64 and ZX Spectrum, the ten game compilation raised money for the NSPCC and RSSPCC.
