= Joe & Mac 2: Lost in the Tropics =

1994 video game

- North American cover art
- Developer: Data East
- Publishers: JP/NA: Data East; EU: Elite Systems
- Director: Seiichi Ishii
- Producer: Hideo Fukuda
- Designer: Shingo Kuwana
- Programmer: Toshiyuki Ebisawa
- Artist: Yoshihiro Yamamoto
- Composer: Tatsuya Kiuchi
- Series: Joe & Mac
- Platform: Super Nintendo Entertainment System
- Release: JP: February 18, 1994; NA: April 1994; EU: November 1995
- Genre: Platform
- Modes: Single-player, multiplayer

Joe & Mac 2: Lost in the Tropics, (Note: Known in Japan as Caveman Combat 3: The Protagonists Are Joe & Mac Again (戦え原始人3 主役はやっぱり ジョー&マック, Tatakae Genshinjin Surī: Shuyaku wa Yappari Jō to Makku)) known in PAL regions as Joe & Mac 3: Lost in the Tropics, is a 1994 platform video game developed and published by Data East for the Super Nintendo Entertainment System. It was initially released in Japan and North America in 1994, and in Europe by Elite Systems in 1995. It is a sequel to Joe & Mac and a follow-up to Congo's Caper, the second game in the series.

== Gameplay ==
A two-player match against an Elasmosaurus.

The object of the game is to defeat Neanderthals with two caveman ninja heroes along with dinosaurs and huge level bosses. Each player controls either Joe or Mac with limited lives and continues. Players can also choose to fall in love with a girlfriend in their Stone Age village; giving her flowers and meat as presents. Once the player gets married, he gets to father a child. Stone wheels are the official currency in the game and players can replay levels in order to get more stone wheels. An overhead free roam map offers a chance for players to select their level like they were playing a console role-playing game. The action-packed levels are in side view.

Boss enemies include Stegosaurus, Pteranodon, Triceratops, Elasmosaurus, and Tyrannosaurus. After defeating each boss, the player will earn one of the rainbow stones. During the game, friendly creatures such as Pteranodon, Styracosaurus and Plesiosaurus will give the player a ride.

The game features six levels, including a valley, a jungle, a snowy mountain range, a swamp, and a volcano. In the final level, the player must defeat each of the boss enemies a second time before battling Gork. When Gork is defeated, he gains power from the crown and turns into a warthog demon. When Gork is defeated a second time, the player will earn the crown and end the game.

== Re-releases ==
Joe & Mac 2: Lost in the Tropics has been re-released several times since its original incarnation.

In late 2017, it was part of a compilation cartridge by Retro-Bit for the Super NES titled Data East Joe & Mac: Ultimate Caveman Collection which also includes the SNES version of Joe & Mac and Congo's Caper. Like other cartridges that came after the console's lifespan, the compilation was not licensed by Nintendo, but was nonetheless authorized by G-Mode, the copyright holder of the game.

The game was added to the Nintendo Classics service for the Nintendo Switch on September 5, 2019. In 2020, it was released on one of ten cartridges at launch for the Evercade handheld console as part of Data East Collection 1.

The game was included in a compilation called Joe & Mac Retro Collection, released for modern consoles on October 29, 2026.

== Reception ==
Reception

Aggregate score
Aggregator	Score
OpenCritic	53% recommend(Retro Collection) (Note: Based on 17 reviews.)

GamePro gave the game a moderately positive review. In 2011, IGN listed the game as number 61 on their list of the top 100 SNES video games. Total! gave the game an average review, noting its gameplay as bland and easy difficulty. Super Gamer gave the game a review score of 75%. Nintendo Game Zone gave a review score of 89%. They praised the game music and the gameplay style for having unique variations in the levels of the game.
