= Game Preservation Society =

Non-profit organization

The Game Preservation Society (Japanese: ゲーム保存協会, romanized: Gēmu Hozon Kyōkai) is a non-profit organization dedicated to the preservation of Japanese video games on PC and other devices.

In 2021, the Game Preservation Society launched a fundraising effort to purchase as many i-mode mobile games as possible. They were successfully able to download games from publishers such as Sega and G-mode before store fronts closed on November 30th.
