= Skull Fang =

1996 video game

- Advertising flyer
- Developer: Data East
- Publisher: Data East
- Directors: Minoru Sano; Koji Jinbo (Arcade); Toshiyuki Kajiwara (Sega Saturn)
- Producer: Minoru Sano (Sega Saturn)
- Designers: Hironori Kobayashi; Wataru Iida, Ichikawa, Masaou Tomosawa (software); Masao Yahachi, Shingo Mitsui (hardware)
- Artists: Hiroshi Tamawashi; Seiji Sato; Yoshinari Kaiho; Tomoyuki Arakawa (Arcade); Toshimi Inaba, Kouji Ueda, Kouji Iida (Sega Saturn)
- Composers: Hiroaki Yoshida (Arcade); Masaaki Iwasaki (Sega Saturn w Hiroaki Yoshida)
- Series: Kuuga
- Platforms: Arcade, Sega Saturn
- Release: Arcade: NA/JP: 1996; Saturn: JP: May 30, 1997
- Genre: Vertical-scrolling shooter
- Modes: Single-player, multiplayer
- Arcade system: Data East MLC System hardware

Skull Fang (Note: Known in Japan as Skull Fang: Kuuga Gaiden (スカルファング ～空牙外伝～)) is a 1996 vertical-scrolling shooter developed and published in arcades by Data East. Skull Fang is the third and final entry in a loose trilogy of games beginning with 1989's Vapor Trail. It was released for the Sega Saturn in 1997.

== Gameplay ==
Players choose from one of four jets set among the flying aircraft carrier Skull Fang, as well as a pilot to fly the jet and attack the enemy's squadrons and battalions worldwide.

== Release ==
Skull Fang was later ported by both Data East and Aisystem Tokyo to the Sega Saturn in 1997. This port adds several new features, such as a trial mode, a boss rush mode, a tutorial video and an additional speed mode which has two settings rather than five. Occasionally, the sprites suffer from flickering. Some arranged versions of songs from Vapor Trail are also included in the game disc as redbook audio.

On February 26, 1996, Pony Canyon and Scitron Label added the arcade version's background music of Skull Fang with the background music of another Data East MLC System title, Avengers in Galactic Storm, both into an album titled Skull Fang / Avengers in Galactic Storm, which was released exclusively in Japan. This version also includes two exclusive arranged versions of the songs "Skull Fang" (Stage 1 theme) and "Over Boost" (Stage 2 Boss theme). On July 21, 2010, TEAM Entertainment added the background music of the arcade version with the background music of the first two Kuuga games, plus three other Data East shooting games (Darwin 4078, SRD: Super Real Darwin, and Act-Fancer: Cybernetick Hyper Weapon), into one album titled Data East Retro Game Music Collection, which was distributed exclusively in Japan by Sony Music Distribution.

== Reception ==
A Next Generation reviewer, while acknowledging that the chase mode and back and side thrusts are variations in the shooter formula, concluded Skull Fang to be "a shooter in the most generic sense." He scored the arcade version two out of five stars.

In an article on the Saturn port, Sega Saturn Magazine called Skull Fang "a classic example of over hyped nonsense", and explained that "With two players on screen at once, multiple power-ups and even an original arcade mode (requiring you to turn your TV on its side, Raiden-style), Skull Fang begins to sound fairly impressive. However ... appalling slowdown, unimpressive power-ups and nagging pauses during gameplay are all good reasons for Saturn owners to steer well clear."
