= Data East Arcade Classics =

2010 video game

- Developer: G1M2
- Publisher: Majesco
- Platform: Wii
- Release: NA: February 19, 2010
- Genre: Various
- Modes: Single-player, multiplayer

Data East Arcade Classics is a compilation of video games created by Japanese video game company Data East. Developed by American studio G1M2 and published by Majesco, the collection disc was released for the Wii on February 19, 2010.

== Games ==
Data East Arcade Classics consists of the arcade versions of the following 15 arcade games:

- Bad Dudes Vs. DragonNinja (1988)
- Burnin' Rubber (1982)
- BurgerTime (1982)
- Caveman Ninja (1991)
- Express Raider (1986)
- Heavy Barrel (1987)
- Lock 'n' Chase (1981)
- Magical Drop III (1997)
- Peter Pepper's Ice Cream Factory (1984)
- Side Pocket (1986)
- Sly Spy (1989)
- Street Slam (1994)
- SRD: Super Real Darwin (1987)
- Two Crude (1990)
- Wizard Fire (1992)

On top of this, the game features many unlockable bonus content items.

== Reception ==
Reception

Aggregate score
Aggregator	Score
Metacritic	56/100

Review scores
Publication	Score
Game Informer	5/10
GameZone	6/10
IGN	5/10
Nintendo Life	7/10
Nintendo Power	6.5/10

The game received "mixed" reviews according to the review aggregation website Metacritic.
