= Storm Warrior =

1989 video game

- Developer: Elite Systems
- Publisher: Encore (Elite Systems)
- Designer: Chris Coupe (C64)
- Artist: Paul Walker (C64)
- Composers: Mark Cooksey (C64); Mark Crane (Amstrad)
- Platforms: Amstrad CPC; Commodore 64
- Release: 1989
- Genre: Beat 'em up
- Mode: Single player

Storm Warrior is a 1989 beat 'em up video game developed and released by Elite Systems for the Amstrad CPC and Commodore 64 8-bit home computer systems. The game casts the player in the role of a prince on a quest to rid his kingdom of a witch's curse. It is unrelated to the 1984 game Storm Warrior.

== Gameplay ==
In Storm Warrior, the player controls a hero armed with a sword, who may walk and turn, jump into various directions, defend and attack with his sword (high and medium slashes), kick, and roll. The character walks right through a series of screens, fighting defeating various enemies along the way.

== Plot ==
The evil Witch Queen has summoned a terrible thunderstorm that is to last a hundred years, causing torrential rains, floods, tornadoes, hurricanes and other calamities. The heir prince of the kingdom embarks on a dangerous quest to reach the castle from which the Witch Queen exercises control on the elements, so he can kill her and break the spell.

== Development and release ==
The C64 version was made by the same team which did the C64 port of Forgotten Worlds. The Witch Queen was known as "Queen of Darkness" in an early version of the game.

The game was released straight to Elite's Encore budget range on both cassette and disk for the Commodore 64 and Amstrad CPC. Although the back cover labelled one of the screenshots as ZX Spectrum, all screenshots show the C64 version and no version was released for the ZX Spectrum.

== Reception ==
The game was poorly received. The C64 version of the game received the scores of 44% from Computer + Video Games ("Mark Cooksey's music is pleasant, but otherwise the game has few merits"), 64% from Your Commodore ("an average game" and not in a top division of beat-em-up games") and 51% from CU Amiga ("Basically, SW is just a very dull Barbarian clone"). Micromania Segunda Epoca gave it 6/10, recommending the Amstrad version.
