= Grand National (video game) =

1985 video game

- Publisher: Elite Systems
- Platforms: ZX Spectrum, Amiga
- Release: 1985: Spectrum; 1989: Amiga
- Genre: Sports
- Mode: Single-player

Grand National is a 1985 video game for the ZX Spectrum from British publisher Elite Systems. It is based on the horse race of the same name. The goal is to win a race with your chosen horse at Aintree Racecourse while also having a bet on the outcome. An Amiga port was published in 1989.

== Gameplay ==
Spectrum screenshot

Players must adjust their speed and avoid hedges and other competitors. Rapidly alternating between two keys makes the horse run. Another key jumps over fences.

== Reception ==
Reception

Review scores
Publication	Score
Crash	ZX: 79%
Your Spectrum	ZX: 11/15

Reviewing the ZX Spectrum version, Crash complimented the games graphics, thinking it a "vast improvement" over Elite Systems' previous release, The Dukes of Hazzard, but criticised the lack of each way bets and the unintuitive controls. In their column "Joystick Jury" (formatted in the style of Juke Box Jury), the editors of Your Spectrum generally thought the game would be a hit, complementing the graphics and betting mechanics, but with Ross Holman thinking the pace of the action inadequate.

== See also ==
- Olympic Decathlon, 1980 game with similar controls
