= Kamiko =

2017 video game

- Developer: Skipmore
- Publisher: Flyhigh Works
- Platforms: Nintendo Switch; Windows; PlayStation 4; Xbox One
- Release: Switch: JP: April 13, 2017; WW: April 27, 2017; Windows: WW: June 26, 2019; PS4: JP: June 27, 2019; NA: March 19, 2020; EU: April 24, 2020; Xbox One: WW: August 28, 2019
- Genre: Action
- Mode: Single-player

Kamiko is an action game developed by Skipmore and published by Flyhigh Works. The game was first released for the Nintendo Switch in April 2017, and was later ported to Microsoft Windows, PlayStation 4, and Xbox One in 2019. The game received mixed to positive reviews from critics.

== Gameplay ==
Gameplay screenshot, in which Yamato attacks and defeats an enemy.

Kamiko is an action game in which players fight as miko called "kamiko" and battle against demons while solving puzzles to make their way through the stages. There are three miko available to choose from, each of which has a unique fighting style: Yamato, a water miko who fights with a sword; Uzume, an earth miko who uses a bow and arrow, and Hinome, a fire miko who wields a sacred dagger and shield.

After defeating enemies, players earn SP points, which fill up a Special Attack gauge. Players can chain combos together by consecutively defeating enemies, which increases the amount of SP obtained at once. When 50 SP points are obtained, players can trigger a "Special Attack", allowing the player to attack a wide range of enemies in the surrounding area at once.

Each stage has several torii gates which are magically sealed and must be opened by finding switches to unseal them. Afterwards, the player must defeat a boss to clear the stage and move on to the next area.

== Plot ==
Bestowing the chosen player titular character with one of the Imperial Regalia of Japan, the old man sends her on a quest to unseal the gates and fight off the demons. In each level of Kamiko, the player is tasked with releasing the seals on four sealed gates spread throughout the level.

== Development and release ==
In 2016, Flyhigh Works and Skipmore were developing the game Picontier, which was planned for release on Steam. However, Flyhigh Works determined that development would take longer than was expected, and proposed creating a smaller-scale work as a preliminary step. Skipmore also felt it was necessary to obtain more funding to finish development of Picontier. As such, development of Kamiko began in December 2016.

Development proceeded rapidly, as the original goal was to release the game as a launch title for the Nintendo Switch on March 3, 2017. For this reason, the game was designed to be short and easily replayable, following the design philosophy of classic arcade games that revolved around clearing stages quickly. Skipmore drew inspiration from Valkyrie no Densetsu (1989) and Dark Seal (1990). Time attack elements were added as well.

Development was 90% complete by March 2017. However, the game did not meet its original target of releasing as a Switch launch title. The game was first released in Japan on April 13, 2017, with a worldwide release following two weeks later on April 27.

In addition to Yamato and Uzume, Skipmore originally planned to feature the heroine from their Fairune series of RPG games as a secret playable character. However, it was later decided that it would be better to have three playable characters available from the beginning, so the heroine was reworked into an original character, Hinome, and made playable from the start.

In 2019, Flyhigh Works and Skipmore announced that Kamiko would be ported to other platforms. Versions for Microsoft Windows and PlayStation 4 were released in June 2019, with a version for Xbox One following in August.

In June 2020, a limited physical version for the Nintendo Switch was released in Japan by B-Side Games. Two editions, a normal version and a special edition, were made available, which included a copy of the game, a case, original soundtrack, sticker, postcard, and acrylic keychains featuring the main characters.

== Reception ==
Reception

Aggregate score
| Aggregator | Score |
|---|---|
| Metacritic | (NS) 74/100 |

Review scores
| Publication | Score |
|---|---|
| Destructoid | (NS) 8/10 |
| Famitsu | (NS) 30/40 |
| Jeuxvideo.com | (NS) 14/20 |
| Nintendo Life | (NS) 9/10 |
| Nintendo World Report | (NS) 8/10 |
| Pocket Gamer | (NS) 3/5 |

According to review aggregator site Metacritic, Kamiko received "mixed or average" reviews on Switch. According to Circle Entertainment CEO Chris Chau, Kamiko had sold over 110,000 times by July 2017 on the Nintendo Switch. In April 2018, Flyhigh Works announced that the game had sold over 200,000 copies on the Switch. As of June 2019, the title has sold over 250,000 copies on Switch.

Nintendo Life's Morgan Sleeper stated that the game "nails the feeling of general progression" while praising the gameplay as making up for what little the game has to offer. He also enjoyed the fact that the three playable characters lent "an entirely different flow" to the game which "helped extend the replay value of what is otherwise a very brief experience". Nintendo World Report's Daan Koopman called the game's retro aesthetic "lovely" and its flow "grand". He also noted the games "slower moments" that "never really" dragged the game down. Koopman also disliked the shortness of Kamiko, but felt that it "absolutely owns up" to its brief length.
