= Dr. Franken =

1992 video game

Dr. Franken The Adventures of Dr. Franken
- Developers: Elite Systems; MotiveTime (SNES)
- Publishers: Kemco; DTMC (SNES)
- Programmer: Mark Crane
- Artist: David Percival
- Composer: Mark Cooksey
- Platforms: Game Boy, Super NES
- Release: December 1992 (Game Boy); December 1, 1993 (SNES)
- Genres: Platform, Metroidvania
- Mode: Single-player

Dr. Franken is a platform game released in 1992 for the Game Boy and in 1993 for the Super Nintendo Entertainment System by Elite Systems. It was titled The Adventures of Dr. Franken for the SNES in the United States. The game features Franky, a Frankenstein's monster on a mission to collect the scattered body parts of his girlfriend, Bitsy.

A Mega Drive version was planned but never released. Versions for the Nintendo Entertainment System and Game Gear reached prototype stage, but were also not released. A Game Boy sequel, Dr. Franken II, was published in 1993.

== Gameplay ==
The game consists of seven floors (20 stages in various places of the world in the SNES version) where various items and parts of Bitsy (Franky's girlfriend) are hidden. Keys and special items are needed to access additional areas to find more body parts and equipment required to resurrect Bitsy. The Game Boy release of the game uses a password-based saving system to save the player's progress.

== Music ==
The Game Boy and unreleased NES versions of the game use two classical music pieces throughout. The title screen music is Bach's Fugue No. 2 In C Minor BWV 847 (The Well Tempered Clavier in C), and the gameplay music is Beethoven's Moonlight Sonata. The Game Boy and NES versions' music was arranged by Mark Cooksey. He composed the music in C-Lab Notator for the Atari ST.

== Legacy ==
Franky also appeared in the 1993 Game Boy puzzle game Franky, Joe & Dirk: On the Tiles, along with Joe from Joe & Mac and Dirk the Daring from Dragon's Lair. Dr. Franken II is a sequel to the original and was released for the Game Boy in 1997. It was developed by MotiveTime and published by Jaleco. It is a platform game in which the lead character, Franky, must escape the castle in which he is trapped in order to search for pieces of a gold tablet which will help him to stave off debt.
