= Two Crude =

1990 video game

- Arcade flyer
- Developers: Data East (Arcade); ISCO & Opera House (MD/GEN)
- Publisher: Data East
- Producer: Iwao Horita
- Designer: Akira Ohtami
- Programmers: Takaaki Inoue; Sōichi Akiyama
- Composers: Azusa Hara; Hiroaki Yoshida; Tatsuya Kiuchi (Arcade); Hitoshi Sakimoto (MD/GEN)
- Platforms: Arcade, Mega Drive/Genesis, Windows
- Release: February 1990: Arcade; JP: February 1990; HK: March 1990; NA: April 1, 1990; EU: April 1990 Mega Drive/Genesis; JP: February 28, 1992; NA: March 1992; EU: 1992
- Genres: Beat 'em up, platform
- Modes: Single-player, multiplayer

Two Crude, released in Japan as Crude Buster, (Note: Japanese: クルードバスター, Hepburn: Kurūdo Basutā) is a 1990 beat 'em up video game developed and published by Data East for arcades. It was a follow-up to Bad Dudes Vs. DragonNinja (1988). The game was later ported to the Mega Drive/Genesis in 1992. Outside Japan, the port was released under the name Two Crude Dudes.

In the game, players control Biff and Spike, two mercenaries hired by the American government to stop the terrorist organization "Big Valley". Their objective is to retake control of a ruined New York City from Big Valley after a nuclear explosion the group caused.

== Gameplay ==
Players control Biff (player 1) and Spike (player 2) by jumping, dodging and attacking their way through legions of enemies. Because the duo are muscle-bound brawlers, they have the ability to pick up objects well beyond their own weight (e.g. cars and traffic lights) to use as weapons. They can do the same to most enemies as well. While playing co-op, it is also possible for one player to pick up the other to use as a projectile.

Each player has a life bar, which decreases each time they are hit. Some enemies can grab onto the players and drain their life. A player loses a life when his life bar reaches zero. If the hit that finishes a player is an explosion or flame, he slumps to the ground burnt. The life bar can be fully refilled between stages, with a cut scene showing Biff and/or Spike punching a "Power Cola" vending machine causing sodas to fall out which they drink. These vending machines also feature in most stages as replenishment points.

== Ports and related releases ==
The game was later ported to the Mega Drive/Genesis by ISCO/Opera House, but the North American and European versions of them were retitled Two Crude Dudes. The Japanese version of this port kept the Japanese arcade version's title unchanged.

The arcade version was later included in the compilation disc Data East Arcade Classics, along with other Data East arcade games bought by G-Mode after Data East's bankruptcy.

== Reception ==
Reception

Review scores
Publication	Score
Crash	Positive (Arcade)
Computer and Video Games	95% (Arcade)
Sinclair User	94% (Arcade)
Console XS	91% (Mega Drive)
MegaTech	87% (Mega Drive)

In Japan, Game Machine listed Crude Buster on their April 15, 1990 issue as being the seventh most-successful table arcade unit of the month. In Hong Kong, it was the top-grossing conversion kit on the Bondeal arcade charts from March to April 1990.

The arcade game was critically acclaimed upon release. Writing for Computer and Video Games magazine, Julian Rignall called Crude Buster "one of the best beat'em ups I've seen in years" and rated it a 95%. Mark Caswell of Crash magazine called it a fun and humorous beat-'em-up. Sinclair User also noted the game's humor, comparing it to playing an interactive cartoon. They wrote that it was even better than other recent Data East games, including the game's predecessor, Bad Dudes Vs. DragonNinja. The magazine dubbed it a "classic" in terms of style and gameplay.

The Mega Drive version was also well-received. Mega magazine placed the game at #37 in their Top Mega Drive Games of All Time. MegaTech magazine said it was "the first Megadrive beat 'em up that comes close to rivalling Streets of Rage".
