= Hazard Run =

1982 video game

- Publisher: Artworx
- Programmer: Dennis R. Zander
- Platform: Atari 8-bit
- Release: WW: 1982
- Genre: Racing
- Mode: Single-player

Hazard Run is a 1982 racing video game developed by Dennis R. Zander and published by Artworx for Atari 8-bit computers. In 1984, Artworx considered re-publishing the game as a tie-in to the television series The Dukes of Hazzard.

== Gameplay ==
The Gee Lee beginning a river jump

Hazard Run is played from an overhead perspective, with vertically scrolling gameplay. The player, driving the Gee Lee, must escape a crooked sheriff while avoiding hazards such as ducks, fences, rocks, rivers, and trees. The player is given five cars, which act as lives. The player loses a car if an obstacle is hit. The car can be driven on two tires to maneuver through tight areas. There are five courses, known as runs, with each one longer than the previous. The player is required to save up extra gasoline in later levels by driving over gas cans.

The perspective switches to a side view when the Gee Lee approaches a jump over a river. Upon clearing the final river, the pursuing police vehicle lands in the water. Bars from the song "Dixie" play after each river jump, regardless of the outcome.

== Reception ==
Derrick Bang, writing for Softline magazine, wrote that the game's "major problem" was its joystick control scheme. Bang also criticized the "Dixie" music played in each of the game's river sections: "it would be nicer (and preferable psychologically) to hear something different as a reward for making the jump." Bang concluded that the game "is just a bit too primitive for today's market and will be of interest mostly to neophytes and young children."

Ted Salamone of Electronic Games called the game "well conceived" but "poorly executed." Salamone criticized the game's "sloppy play action" and wrote that the graphics "finish in first and last place. Some (the overhead view of a car and trees) are done well, while others (the auto's side view when jumping water) look like a sixth grader's first art project." In 1991, New Atari User gave the game a "mediocre" score of two stars out of four, calling it "Pretty shallow" while also noting its rarity.

== Legacy ==
In 1984, Artworx considered licensing the title of the television series The Dukes of Hazzard in order to re-publish Hazard Run as a tie-in. Artworx later rejected the idea considering the aftermath of the 1983 video game crash, which involved many licensed games receiving a negative reputation for their simple concepts and gameplay. The cost to purchase the license was also deemed too high, considering the small size of the software market at the time. The Dukes of Hazzard was the only title Artworx ever seriously considered licensing.

== See also ==
- The Dukes of Hazzard (video game)
