= Bad Dudes Vs. DragonNinja =

1988 video game

- North American arcade flyer
- Developer: Data East
- Publishers: Data East: Ports; EU: Imagine Software Namco Ocean Software Majesco; BRA: G-mode Co., Ltd.
- Designer: Makoto Kikuchi
- Programmers: Tomotaka Osada; Masaaki Tamura; Nobusuke Sasaki; Naomi Susa; Kenji Takahashi
- Artists: Dot Man; Mix Man; Monsieur Micky; Torba-RR; OK Youichi; Kansaiman; Milky Kikuchi
- Composers: Azusa Hara; Hiroaki Yoshida
- Platforms: Arcade, Amiga, Amstrad CPC, Apple II, Atari ST, Commodore 64, MS-DOS, NES, Nintendo Switch, ZX Spectrum, Zeebo
- Release: April 1988: Arcade; JP: April 1988; NA: May 1988; EU: June 1988 NES; JP: July 14, 1989; NA: August 1989; EU: 1990 Zeebo; SA: July 27, 2012
- Genre: Beat 'em up
- Modes: Single-player, multiplayer (co-operative gameplay)
- Arcade system: Data East MEC-M1

Bad Dudes Vs. DragonNinja, (Note: Japanese: バッド・デュード VSドラゴンニンジャ, Hepburn: Baddo Deyūdo VS DoragonNinja) also known simply as either Bad Dudes (on the American NES port) or DragonNinja (Note: Japanese: ドラゴンニンジャ, Hepburn: DoragonNinja) (in Japan and Europe), is a 1988 beat 'em up video game developed and published by Data East for arcades. It was ported to computer and game console home systems.

In Bad Dudes, the players are tasked with rescuing "President Ronnie" from ninja kidnappers. The game was a commercial success, becoming one of America's top five highest-grossing games in 1988. The arcade version received generally positive reviews from critics, while the home conversions received also a positive critical reception. It has since become widely known for its general premise and introductory cutscene.

== Plot ==
The game is set in Washington, D.C., United States, where President Ronnie (based on 40th President Ronald Reagan) has been abducted by the evil Dragon Ninja. The game begins with the following introduction: "Rampant ninja related crimes these days ... Whitehouse is not the exception". A Secret Service agent speaks to the titular "Bad Dudes", a tough and heroic duo of street-smart brawlers named Blade and Striker: "President Ronnie has been kidnapped by the ninjas. Are you a bad enough dude to rescue Ronnie?"

=== Chapters ===
The Bad Dudes pursue the Dragon Ninja through the streets of downtown New York City, onto a moving big rig truck, through a large storm sewer, through a forest, onto a freight train on an old Southern Pacific line (where the titular character of another Data East arcade game, Chelnov, can be seen being transported in a frozen container in the arcade version), through a cave, and into an underground factory in order to save President Ronnie.

=== Epilogue (US version) ===
After the Bad Dudes defeat the Dragon Ninja, they celebrate by eating hamburgers with President Ronnie. At the very end, President Ronnie is seen holding a burger while standing between the Bad Dudes. Behind them are many security guards, with the White House in the background.

=== Epilogue (Japan version) ===
President Ronnie gives the Bad Dudes a statue of them, as a reward for rescuing and protecting both Washington, D.C., and its leader. The Bad Dudes are seen leaning against a fence on a sidewalk next to their statue.

== Gameplay ==
Arcade gameplay

Up to two players can play simultaneously. The first player controls the character wearing white pants, while the second player character wears green pants. Players start with the ability to do basic punches, kicks, and jumps. Some moves are special like spinning kicks and the ability to charge themselves up with "inner energy" by holding the punch button to throw a powerful long-range attack that hits all opponents in front of the player. Players will also come across several power-ups; some are weapons like knives and nunchakus, some recharge a player's health, and others add a few seconds to the remaining time.

The various types of enemies encountered in the game have their own means of attack. The basic blue-colored ninjas directly charge the player, while some leap with their swords, or throw shuriken and makibishi; there are also acrobatic kunoichi (female ninjas), attack dogs, and people who are on fire. The enemies may be beaten down or avoided. Most enemies can be beaten with only a single hit of any kind, and multiple enemies can be defeated with one hit if they are standing close together.

At the end of each level, one of the super warrior bosses will appear, who needs to be defeated to progress to the next level. The first of them, at the climax of the City stage, is Karnov, who makes a cameo appearance from the Data East game of the same name. Second, at the climax of the Truck stage, is a talon-wielding ninja, Iron Arm. Third, at the climax of the Sewer stage, is Kamui, another ninja master, who creates illusions by copying himself. Fourth, at the climax of the Forest stage, is Animal, a behemoth-of-a-man who is also not a ninja. Fifth, at the climax of the Train stage, is Akaikage, a kusarigama-wielding warrior. Last, at the climax of the Cave stage, is Devil Pole, a bōjutsu-master. Finally, the leader of the Dragon Ninja gang, coincidentally also called Dragon Ninja, appears during the climax in his headquarters, where there is a final showdown on a helicopter. The background music during the fight with him is similar to the main theme in Karnov. (Note: In later levels, another version of him with a different color palette sometimes appears as a minor enemy referred to as Kusamoci Karnov.)

Each boss has his own special attack: Karnov, for example, can breathe fire at the player. Upon the successful completion of each level and after defeating the boss, the dude(s) will strike a "bad" pose and proclaim, "I'm bad!". The shout, and the game's American wordmark logo are both similar to the Michael Jackson song "Bad", released the previous year. In the Japanese version of the game, this quote was originally a battle cry.

== History ==
The game was ported to home systems, including the Apple II, Atari ST, Amiga, Amstrad CPC, Commodore 64, ZX Spectrum, MSX, MS-DOS in 1988. Quicksilver Software developed the Apple II and PC ports with the rest produced by UK-based Ocean Software and published in Europe on their Imagine label as Bad Dudes Vs. DragonNinja. These versions were titled Dragon Ninja in-game, and the "Bad Dudes Vs." was de-emphasised in the cover art, resulting in the game commonly being known by the latter title (including among the European gaming press of the time).

A NES/Famicom port was developed by Data East and published in Japan by Namco as DragonNinja on July 14, 1989. In North America, the same version was released that year by Data East USA simply as Bad Dudes, featuring an illustration by Marc Ericksen.

After Data East became defunct due to their bankruptcy in 2003, G-Mode bought the intellectual rights to the arcade game, as well as most other Data East games, and licensed them globally. The arcade version is also featured, along with several other Data East arcade games, on the Wii title Data East Arcade Classics, produced by Majesco with permission from G-Mode. In 2018, the Nintendo Switch version was released in the Johnny Turbo's Arcade series, featuring a live-action intro. It uses a fanart mockup screenshot, but actually has the original arcade graphics.

The 8-bit versions and the PC version lack the two-player cooperative mode in any form, instead having an alternating two-player mode. The title screen of the Japanese version became different, while the English version is unchanged. The Secret Service agent's quote on the intro screen of the NES version is phrased slightly differently as "The President has been kidnapped by ninjas. Are you a bad enough dude to rescue the President?", while the Famicom counterpart's quote is slightly similar to the international arcade and NES quotes. The reference to President Ronnie (an overt reference to former president of the United States Ronald Reagan) was removed because Nintendo of America did not allow political content in games. In that version, the President bears a resemblance to George H. W. Bush, who was the president of the United States when the NES version was released. The endings of the Japanese and English language versions of the NES port are based on the international arcade version, but the Japanese version does not show the credits and only shows "The End" at the White House scene and lasts a shorter time than the English version. The 8-bit home computer versions lack the intro from either the arcade or the NES versions. The "I'm bad!" speech is only present in the NES version.

== Reception ==
Reception

Review scores
Publication	Score						
Publication	Amiga	Arcade	Atari ST	C64	NES	PC	ZX
ACE		Positive		860		856 (CPC)	792
Crash							46%
Computer and Video Games		Positive			49%	69% (CPC)	
Sinclair User		9/10					
The Games Machine (UK)		Positive	50%	47%		63% (CPC)	61%
Your Sinclair		Positive					7/10
Zzap!64				87%			
Commodore User	73% (1989); 19% (1991)	5/10		84%			
Computer Entertainer					6/8 stars		

Award
Publication	Award
Sinclair User	Beat 'Em Up of 1988

=== Arcade ===
The game was commercially successful in arcades. In Japan, Game Machine listed DragonNinja on their May 15, 1988, issue as being the seventh most-successful table arcade unit of the month. In North America, it was a high-earning arcade game, becoming one of the top five highest-grossing arcade games of 1988. On the UK Coinslot charts, during Summer 1988, Bad Dudes was number two on the monthly arcade video game chart. On Hong Kong's annual Bondeal chart, it was the seventh highest-grossing arcade game of 1988.

The arcade game received generally positive reviews from critics upon release. Sinclair User magazine, in its January 1989 issue, gave it the award for best Beat 'Em Up of 1988.

=== Home ===
In the ZX Spectrum sales charts, it was number two, behind Robocop.

The home conversions received a generally positive to mixed critical reception. Computer Gaming World noted the IBM port was satisfactory and compared it favorably to similar ports of Double Dragon and Renegade, but the Apple II port suffered greatly.

President Ronnie, as he appears in the arcade version of the game, was ranked second in EGM's list of the top ten video game politicians in 2008. In 2010, UGO wrote: "No ninja game retrospective could possibly be complete without some mention of ... Bad Dudes". In 2013, Complex had it top their list of "the video games where you kick ass in the name of America" as the most American game of them all.

== Legacy ==
The game was followed by a spiritual successor in 1991: Two Crude (known in Japan as Crude Buster). A sequel which was supposed to take place 23 years after the first game was unsuccessfully attempted to be financed via Kickstarter by Pinstripe Games in 2012.

The arcade version of the game appears in the 1989 film Parenthood, where the son of Steve Martin's character wonders why the game is so difficult. Martin, grasping for an answer, says, "Well, they're bad dudes. That's why they call the game Bad Dudes". The Bad Dudes logo can be seen at the end of Stage 4 in Sly Spy, another Data East arcade game. In the 1990 film RoboCop 2, Officer Duffy gets pushed by RoboCop into a Bad Dudes Vs. DragonNinja arcade cabinet, but with Sly Spy built into it. (Note: Along with a few other Data East arcade games, they appeared in the film due to licensing and advertising agreements between Orion Pictures, Data East and Ocean Software after the release of two video games based on the RoboCop property.)

The game's introduction, challenging the player to be a "bad enough dude to rescue the President", became a popular Internet meme and is often lampooned on various websites. The 2008 video game Sam & Max Beyond Time and Space spoofs on the Bad Dudes intro in the episode "Chariots of the Dogs". Alternative rock band Lostprophets' first release, The Fake Sound of Progress, includes a track titled "Shinobi vs. Dragon Ninja" in a reference to the video games Shinobi and Bad Dudes vs. DragonNinja. The webcomic The Adventures of Dr. McNinja often references the Bad Dudes, among many other 1980s pop culture touchstones.

In 2018, an updated version of the game was announced for the Intellivision Amico.

In 2023, filmmaker BenDavid Grabinski discussed how he tried to make a film adaptation of the video game.

=== Rereleases ===
Reissues of the game were nonexistent in the two decades that followed its original release. In recent years, however, rereleases of the original arcade version Bad Dudes Vs. DragonNinja and its NES port Bad Dudes have become increasingly common:

- Bad Dudes Vs. DragonNinja is one of the 15 arcade games included in Data East Arcade Classics released in February 2010 for the Wii.
- The arcade version is on the Zeebo Brazilian home console released in 2010.
- The NES version is included in the compilation Retro-Bit Data East All Star Collection, a multi-cart of five Data East games released in 2017 for the Nintendo Entertainment System itself. Another compilation from the same manufacturer called 8 Bit Collection Data East Vol.01, with a similar assortment of titles, was released the following year in Japan for the Retro Duo famiclone and includes the American NES port of Bad Dudes unlike the rest of the Data East games of that regional collection which are all in their Famicom versions.
- The game is part of the dedicated console Super Retro-Cade released in late 2017 and is one of the few titles in the compilation to have both its arcade and NES versions included.
- The arcade version was released in 2018 for the Nintendo Switch as part of Flying Tiger's Johnny Turbo series.
- Since 2018, the retro gaming company My Arcade has released the NES version on different occasions either as a standalone mini-arcade cabinet or as part of a collection of eight Data East games, both as a mini-cabinet and handheld console. The same company also released the arcade version Bad Dudes Vs. DragonNinja in a compilation that included more than 30 Data East games in the form of a mini-arcade cabinet.
- In early 2020, Bad Dudes Vs. DragonNinja along with three other Data East classics were released in an actual arcade cabinet at the cost of $399 by manufacturer Arcade1Up.
- The arcade version and the NES port are each included in their respective collections for the Evercade handheld console.
