= Virtuoso (video game) =

1994 third-person shooter video game

- North American MS-DOS cover art
- Developer: MotiveTime
- Publishers: MS-DOS: NA: Nova Spring; EU: Elite Systems; 3DO: NA: Data East; EU: Elite Systems; JP: Imagineer
- Programmers: Andrew G. Williams; Mat Draper; Peter Wake
- Artists: Andrew Taylor; Russell Phillips; Wayne Edwards
- Composer: Thai Dyed Suicide
- Platforms: MS-DOS, 3DO
- Release: MS-DOS: NA: 1994; EU: 1994; 3DO: NA: 1995; EU: 1995; JP: 1 September 1995
- Genre: Third-person shooter
- Mode: Single-player

Virtuoso (Note: Also known as Virtuoso: Rock & Roll Shooting (Japanese: バーチャル・ソー: ロック そして ロール 射撃, Hepburn: Bācharu sō: Rokkunrōru Satsuei) in Japan on the 3DO) is a third-person shooter video game developed by MotiveTime and originally published by Nova Spring and Elite Systems in North America and Europe, respectively, for MS-DOS in 1994 and then 3DO in 1995.

== Plot ==
MS-DOS screenshot

Virtuoso is a game set in the year 2055 where the player is a rock musician who fights in Virtual Reality.

== Development ==
Virtuoso was produced by the British studio MotiveTime, a branch of Elite Systems. The game was conceived as a "true multimedia product" that marries the gaming and music industries, which the company believed were on "rapidly converging paths," according to an Elite spokesperson. Versions were created for MS-DOS and 3DO while the project was led by Andrew "Andy" Williams. Development began with the game as a 3D action game with "platform overtones" rather than as a third-person shooter. An early interactive camera system was devised that followed behind the player character. Williams claimed that the team had a particular rockstar in mind when considering who to digitize for the main protagonist, but did not reveal who it was. The same anti-aliasing digitization tool had been used in Twisted: The Game Show.

== Release ==
Virtuoso was released for MS-DOS in late 1994 in Europe by Elite and in North America by Nova Spring, an arm of Vic Tokai. The 3DO version was published in 1995 again in Europe by Elite and in North America by Data East. A Japanese release of the 3DO edition was handled by Imagineer on September 1, 1995. A port for the Jaguar CD was in development by Williams Brothers Developments and planned to be published by Telegames. It was originally slated for a spring/summer 1995 release and later planned for a Q2 1995 release. However, Telegames UK president Pete Mortimer stated in an e-mail exchange with website CyberRoach that work on the port and other upcoming games from the company for the Jaguar were suspended after sales of previous titles published by them were not profitable. When asked if he thought Telegames held onto the license for years due to a royalties dispute with Elite, the latter company's Steve Wilcox responded, "I'm sure any terms that may have been discussed would have been 'commercially reasonably'."

== Reception and legacy ==
Reception

Review scores
Publication	Score
Computer and Video Games	70% (PC/3DO)
Electronic Gaming Monthly	4/10 (3DO)
Hyper	15/100 (PC)
Joystick	120/200 (PC)
Next Generation	2/5 (PC)
PC Zone	25/100 (PC)
3DO Magazine	1/5 (3DO)
Electronic Entertainment	3/5 (3DO)
Génération 4	20% (PC)
MAN!AC	35% (3DO)
PC Joker	68% (PC)
PC Player	52/100 (PC)
Pelit	68/100 (PC)
Play Time	15% (PC)
Power Play	35% (PC)
Ultimate Future Games	55% (3DO)
Video Games (DE)	38% (3DO)

Virtuoso received largely negative reviews. Next Generation gave two stars out of five to the MS-DOS version of the game; the magazine was critical of its gameplay and called it a Doom clone without the first person perspective or fun.

Electronic Gaming Monthly's Seanbaby placed it as number 5 in his "20 worst games of all time" feature. The Sydney Morning Herald ranked it number 25 among its "100 worst games ever." Hyper listed it as the fourth worst game ever among 25 titles. PC Gamer called it the 11th worst PC game of all time and listed both the UK and North American covers among the worst box art.
