= Outlaws of the Lost Dynasty =

1995 video game

- Arcade flyer
- Developer: Data East
- Publisher: Data East
- Platforms: Arcade, Sega Saturn, PlayStation
- Release: Arcade: JP: 1995; Sega Saturn: JP: August 25, 1995; NA: October 1, 1995; PlayStation: JP: January 26, 1996
- Genre: Fighting
- Modes: Single-player, multiplayer
- Arcade system: ST-V

Outlaws of the Lost Dynasty, known in Japan as Suiko Enbu (水滸演武), is a 1995 fighting arcade game developed and published by Data East. It was one of the first games developed for Sega's ST-V arcade board.

== Story ==
For generations, people have believed in the Chinese myth known as the Dark Legend. It occurs sometime in the 11th or 12th century when China plunges into a state of total anarchy, when power-hungry warlords rebel against the central government. To regain control over his empire, the emperor devises a cunning plan. He prepares for the ultimate conquest for his most ambitious rivals, a challenge that no warlord is able to resist as the rewards are unimaginable. The victor will be endowed with incredible abilities and possess ultimate power, not to mention unlimited wealth. The triumph is absolute as defeat means death. Thousands of fearless warriors battle among themselves with special fighting abilities.

== Gameplay ==
The game has eleven playable characters and many locations around China to choose from. Each character fights with their own unique weapon while some are unarmed. If the weapon is used to block attacks too often, the character will only be able to fight with their bare hands and lose the weapon for the rest of the round. Fighting moves are classified under low, medium and hard in terms of attack power, in order of increasing amount of damage dealt to an opponent. Each character also has their own special attack to use against the opponent.

== Characters ==
The game takes place in Liangshan Marsh, where 12 of the strongest outlaws out of 108 gather to test their battle skills against each other while the Gods of War watch from above. The characters are inspired by the 108 outlaws from the 14th century Chinese classical novel Water Margin by Shi Naian.

== Ports ==
Data East ported Outlaws of the Lost Dynasty to the Sega Saturn in 1995 and PlayStation in 1996. The North American home version was retitled Dark Legend, while the Japanese title remains unchanged in the Japanese home versions. The Japanese port includes both an Original Mode, the mode that plays just like the arcade version, and a Special Mode, which adds extra moves. There is also a beginner mode that can be accessed by pressing the L or R button at the same time. In 2P Battle mode, Makoto Mizoguchi from the Fighter's History series (also by Data East) can be unlocked. The North American version is an update from the Japanese version and was translated for the American audience; however, most of the Japanese text and voice samples remained. Some of the options were removed, as well as the option demo play. Unlike the Japanese version, this version lacks the Arcade Mode, it defaults to Special Mode instead.

A Japan-exclusive semi-sequel titled Suiko Enbu: Fuunsaiki (水滸演武 風雲再起) was released in 1996 only for the Sega Saturn. Along with Makoto Mizoguchi, another character from the Fighter's History series, Ryo Yeong-mi, was added to the roster.

In 2009, G-Mode ported the PlayStation version of Outlaws of the Lost Dynasty over to the PlayStation 3 and PlayStation Portable in Japan. This port was later released in North America on October 4, 2010 and May 16, 2012 in Europe.

== Reception ==
In Japan, Game Machine listed Outlaws of the Lost Dynasty on their April 15, 1995 issue as being the sixteenth most-successful arcade game of the month.

Reception

Review score
Publication	Score
Famitsu	7/10, 5/10, 6/10, 6/10 (Saturn)

A reviewer for Next Generation gave the Saturn version 2 out of 5 stars, commenting that, "There are a few elements in Dark Legends [sic] that make thorough use of Saturn's power, including a wide variety of colors, smoothly scaling backgrounds, and unusually large fighters. But for the most part, DL is very much like all the 2D fighters preceding it. Though it is possible to have fun playing this game, it would be a mistake to buy a next generation system for a game like Dark Legends." Tommy Glide of GamePro similarly remarked, "Nothing new here: average 2D graphics and adequate fighting earmark Data East's coin-op conversion of Dark Legend." He particularly criticized that the characters lack dramatic reactions to being beaten, though he praised the voice acting and "intensity" of the musical score. Like Next Generation, he found the game to be essentially fun but not worth getting in light of the more distinctive fighting games coming out for the Saturn.
