= The Fidgetts =

1993 video game

- Developer: Game Over Production
- Publishers: Elite Systems, GX Media Co, Jaleco
- Platform: Game Boy
- Release: UK: 1993; JP: 22 April 1994; NA: October 1997
- Genre: Platform
- Mode: Single-player

The Fidgetts is a 1993 video game for the Game Boy developed by Game Over Production and published by Elite Systems. The game was later published by GX Media Co in Japan in 1994 and Jaleco in North America in 1997. The game is a platform video game in which players alternate between two mice, Frankie and Freddie, to navigate mazelike levels to help both reach the end. Upon release, The Fidgetts received average reviews, with praise for its visual design and backgrounds, and criticism of its difficulty and time limits.

== Gameplay ==
Gameplay screenshot

Players assist brothers Frankie and Freddie Fidgett, two mice who are travelling through the city sewers to the docks to board a departing ship with the rest of their family in America. To complete platforming puzzles, players must switch between the two characters pressing the Select button and get both to the end of a level before the time limit runs out. Frankie can jump on top of the other to reach higher spaces, and the other can travel through narrow spaces. Objects such as blocks and springs are found throughout levels, and can be picked up and carried. Between levels, players complete bonus stages featuring Breakout-style puzzles. The game features a password save system to record progress across levels. A two-player mode utilising the Game Link Cable was originally planned, but removed from the game.

== Reception ==
Reception

Review scores
| Publication | Score |
|---|---|
| Famitsu | 5/10, 3/10, 4/10, 4/10 |
| Nintendo Power | 5.2/10 |
| GB Action | 91% |
| Mega Fun | 75% |
| Nintendo Game Zone | 82% |

GB Action commended the graphics of The Fidgetts as "top-notch" and found it easy to control, although felt the timer was "harsh" and the password save system was "annoying", writing that a single failure to complete a stage can automatically end the game. Stating the game's graphics and music were "decent" for the platform, Mega Fun praised the game's originality for not following "the usual jump 'n' run games but actually [offering] something unique". Nintendo Power praised the game's "nicely detailed backgrounds", but found the game difficult due to their "length, time limit and the poor shooting play control", stating the delay in shooting the slingshot made "simple tasks overly difficult". Nintendo Game Zone considered the game's difficulty to be "tortuously tough" due to its time limits.
