= Hoppin' Mad =

1988 video game

- Publisher: Elite Systems
- Platforms: Amstrad CPC, Commodore 64, ZX Spectrum
- Release: 1988
- Genre: Action

Hoppin' Mad is an action game released in 1988 by Elite Systems for the Amstrad CPC, Commodore 64, and ZX Spectrum

The game takes place over 12 levels. On each level, the player has to guide a group of bouncing balls from the right edge of the level to the left edge. The balls are constantly bouncing, and the player can only alter their travel speed (by moving the joystick left or right) or make them bounce higher (by pressing the fire button). The objective of the game is to collect ten balloons; doing so will advance the player to the next level.

Various different dangers appear on the levels, including sharp rocks, venus flytraps, hedgehogs and flying birds. The game starts with four balls, and each time the balls collide with a dangerous object, one ball bursts. If all four balls are burst, the player loses a life.

Elite Systems developed an NES version which was never released.

== Reception ==
Reception

Review scores
Publication	Score
Crash	78%
Computer and Video Games	4/10
Sinclair User	46%
Your Sinclair	8/10
Zzap!64	64%

Hoppin' Mad received varying reception from different platforms by video game critics.
