= Dogs of War (1989 video game) =

- Developer: Elite Systems
- Publisher: Elite Systems
- Programmer: Tim Coupe
- Artist: Chris Sorrell
- Composer: David Whittaker
- Platforms: Atari ST, Amiga
- Release: 1989
- Genre: Run and gun
- Modes: Single-player, multiplayer

Dogs of War is a vertically scrolling run and gun video game developed and published by Elite Systems for the Amiga and Atari ST in 1989. Players assume the role of freelance mercenaries who are sent on international assignments to topple governments and rescue people in danger.

== Gameplay ==
Dogs of War offers a campaign consisting of twelve missions that can be completed in single-player or co-op mode. In each mission, players must complete different objectives, such as rescuing a kidnapped child, retrieving a valuable piece of art, or killing a criminal. They must simultaneously defend against waves of enemies. Missions increase in difficulty as the player progresses through the game. Upon completing missions, players earn money in-game, which can be used to purchase new items and upgrade weapons, allowing them to take down heavy obstacles that appear in later stages. These obstacles include turrets, military jeeps, and tanks. Weapons in the game include pistols, Kalashnikovs, chain guns, grenades, rocket launchers, and a flamethrower. After completing all twelve missions, the players' characters are offered the choice to join either the regular or salvation army.

== Reception ==
Dogs of War received moderate to mixed reviews. Zzap!64 magazine editors Robin and Phil gave the game an overall score of 77%, stating that the game was "hardly innovative... [but] very addictive and (as always) more fun with two players... this is great mindless fun." User-run forums such as Lemon Amiga and Atari Mania gave the game a 7.04 and 7.4/10, respectively.
