= Mark Cooksey =

British musician (born 1966)

Mark Cooksey (born 18 January 1966 in Skegness, Lincolnshire, England) is a British video game musician, best known for his work on the Commodore 64, particularly composing the music for the platform game Ghosts'n Goblins. He was employed by the UK video game developer and publisher Elite Systems.

Since the demise of the Commodore 64, Mark has produced music for the Game Boy (including the Game Boy Color and Game Boy Advance), PC, Super NES and PlayStation. His Game Boy Color work includes the music and sound effects for the 2001 game Commander Keen.
