= Tournament Golf =

1983 video game

- Developer: Avalon Hill
- Publisher: Avalon Hill
- Platforms: Apple II, C64
- Release: 1983
- Genre: Sport

Tournament Golf is a 1983 video game published by Avalon Hill.

== Gameplay ==
Tournament Golf is a game in which players make use of their own skills in a golf simulation.

== Reception ==
Russell Sipe reviewed the game for Computer Gaming World, stating that: "TG is highly recommended for any golfer with a [sic] Apple II."
