= Act-Fancer =

1989 video game

Act-Fancer: Cybernetick Hyper Weapon
- Japanese arcade flyer
- Developer: Data East
- Publisher: Data East
- Designers: J. Yamaguchi; Hiroyuki Iwabe
- Programmers: Hisatada Ohta; Kazunori Ishiguri; Toshiyuki Sakai
- Artists: Torba-RR; Jun Sato; Kinya Aoyama; Masahiko Ujita; Dsyche Minagawa; Modeler K. Yukie Shiraiwa
- Composers: Azusa Hara; Hiroaki Yoshida; Shuji Segawa; Tatsuya Kiuchi
- Platform: Arcade
- Release: 1989
- Genre: Run and gun
- Modes: Single-player, multiplayer

Act-Fancer: Cybernetick Hyper Weapon (Note: Japanese: アクトフェンサー, Hepburn: Akuto Fensā) is a 1989 run and gun video game developed and published by Data East for arcades. Act-Fancer is the third of Data East's 'Evolution Trilogy', following Darwin 4078 and SRD: Super Real Darwin. The two earlier games are vertically scrolling shooters.

== Gameplay ==
Act-Fancer features a cyborg battling against alien creatures, while collecting power-ups to evolve into stronger forms and defeating bosses to advance levels.

== Reception ==
In Japan, Game Machine listed Act-Fancer: Cybernetick Hyper Weapon on their June 15, 1989 issue as being the sixth most-successful table arcade unit of the month.
