= Boogie Wings =

1992 video game

- Developer: Data East
- Publisher: Data East
- Director: Naomi Susa
- Designer: Kazuyuki Kurata
- Programmers: Takuya Haga; Shinji Hirao; Ace Lida
- Artists: Yoshinari Kaiho; Takahide Koizumi; Tomoyuki Arakawa; Masashi Inagaki; Kazumi Minagawa; Makoto Nozu; Fujimi Ōnishi; Smoking Tada; Slow Hand Kurata; Masahiko Ujita; Masanori Oe
- Composers: Tatsuya Kiuchi; Tomoyoshi Sato; Mihoko Ando
- Platform: Arcade
- Release: NA: 1992
- Genre: Scrolling shooter
- Modes: Single-player, multiplayer

Boogie Wings (known in Japan as The Great Ragtime Show (ザ・グレイト・ラグタイムショー)) is a horizontally scrolling shooter developed and published by Data East. It was released as an arcade video game in 1992.

== Gameplay ==
Gameplay screenshot

The game is set around the time of World War I, where the player maneuvers biplanes, automobiles, animals, and various other unidentifiable objects to battle an army of mech-wielding scientists. One of the game's bosses is a giant robot Santa Claus.

The player uses the 8-way joystick to control the biplane's movements, and the 2 buttons to shoot or hook enemies. The biggest characteristic of the player's biplane is the hook attached to its rear section. The hook is also controlled by the joystick, and enemies or objects that come in contact with the hook are dragged along by the plane. Dragged objects cause damage to anything they collide with, and the player can release the objects on the hook by pressing the hook button again. Dragged objects are destroyed when the player releases them from the hook, or if they collide enough times to break apart.

The ship's power gauge increases when the player taps the shot button rapidly, and filling up the gauge causes the plane to shoot a bolt of lightning that covers a large area of the screen. The plane overheats if the player taps the shot button too many times, so this attack must be used sparingly.

The game's graphics are highly detailed, and many of the backgrounds are likened to European towns and cities or World's fair-like scenes. Many of the game's background objects can also be destroyed or dragged around with the hook.

=== Vehicles ===
Though the player's main vehicle is the biplane, they can still continue on foot if their plane is shot down. The player can attack with a handgun while on foot, and can also ride various vehicles found along the way to make the progress easier. The vehicles include various animals such as giraffes, elephants, and horses, pogo sticks, bicycles, motorcycles, jeeps, and several types of robots that can hop and shoot missiles. Though the biplane is by far the most effective unit in terms of game completion, the presence of the ground units adds another layer of amusement to the game.

== Development ==
Rohga: Armor Force was developed and released in Japan by Data East a year prior to Boogie Wings, and the vehicles in Boogie Wings were derived from the gameplay in Rohga: Armor Force, where the player could continue on foot even after their robot was destroyed.
