= The Dukes of Hazzard (video game) =

- Developers: Coleco; Elite Systems (Spectrum)
- Publishers: Coleco; Elite Systems (Spectrum)
- Designers: Lawrence Schick, Jennell Jaquays
- Platforms: ColecoVision; Coleco Adam; ZX Spectrum
- Release: Coleco: WW: 1984; ZX Spectrum: WW: February 23, 1985
- Genre: Racing
- Mode: Single-player

The Dukes of Hazzard is a 1984 racing video game developed and published by Coleco for the ColecoVision game console and Coleco Adam computer. Elite Systems released a different game with the same title for the ZX Spectrum computer on February 23, 1985. Both versions are based on The Dukes of Hazzard television series.

Atari, Inc. previously made two separate attempts to release an Atari 2600 video game based on the series, but both versions failed to materialize.

== Gameplay ==
In the Coleco version, the player controls the General Lee and must drive through Hazzard County. The game's premise concerns Daisy Duke, who has been abducted by Jeremiah Stinge. The player's goal is to catch Stinge, by passing his blue car, while avoiding Boss Hogg. The game ends if the player is stopped by Boss Hogg or if the player wrecks the General Lee. The game requires that the player drive at a perfect speed; driving too slow results in the player being caught by Hogg, while driving too fast can result in a vehicle collision with oncoming traffic. A rear-view mirror provides the player with a way to look out for Hogg. The player must also avoid obstacles such as oil slicks and damaged bridges. The game makes use of the ColecoVision's Expansion Module #2 steering wheel/pedal peripheral, and additionally requires that the player shift gears.

The ZX Spectrum version uses a different premise: Boss Hogg threatens to seize the General Lee as collateral unless Bo Duke and Luke Duke can provide $5,000 owed to him. Bo and Luke enter the Annual Hazzard County Cross Country Road Race, hoping to win the first-place prize of $5,000, but Hogg and the Hazzard County police attempt to halt their efforts. The game is played as a continuously scrolling roadway, with the General Lee travelling from left to right. Controlling the General Lee, the player can change lanes and speed. Enemy vehicles can be avoided or destroyed by the player using dynamite sticks. However, Daisy and her Jeep must not be destroyed. Other enemies include helicopters.

== Development ==
The Coleco version was announced in January 1984, at the Winter Consumer Electronics Show in Las Vegas, Nevada. The Dukes of Hazzard was one of only five games to utilize the ColecoVision's Expansion Module #2. Lawrence Schick worked as a designer on the Coleco version. Jennell Jaquays also worked as a designer on the Coleco version; Jaquays referred to it as one of the games that "didn't do what we had hoped," saying it was "a license we were stuck with and did what we could with it." The ZX Spectrum version was developed to feature nearly 100 different animated frames of the General Lee.

== Reception ==
Jeff Silva of Expandable Computer News, who rated the Coleco version 7 out of 10, praised the sound and graphics, and wrote that the game, "in its simplicity, captures perfectly the one-dimensional themes of the original TV show. It is difficult at first because shifting is much like shifting a manual transmission, so it takes a while to get the hang of it. The rear view mirror on the screen is a great addition." Silva concluded that the game was a "fun, though simple-minded chase through Hazzard County."

Phil Wiswell and Bernie Dekoven of Enter magazine wrote a positive review of the Coleco version: "Believe it or not, this game is good. [...] We were worried that this game would only appeal to Dukes of Hazzard fans, and not be much fun to play. But, in fact, we think you'll like this game whether or not you care for the Duke boys and their TV show. It's a tough driving game that challenges you from start to finish." Wiswell and Dekoven called the game's rear-view mirror "a neat idea, though you don't get to use it enough." Brett Alan Weiss of AllGame wrote that the Coleco version "is not quite on par with more traditional racers from the era such as Turbo, Pole Position or even Pitstop."

Crash magazine rated the ZX Spectrum version 63 percent and praised the graphics but criticized the gameplay. Crash later wrote that "there isn't much, except the General Lee graphics, to connect the game with the TV series." Your Computer rated the ZX Spectrum version three stars and wrote, "The screen display is excellent and the game is rather more playable than some of Elite's previous offerings." Computer and Video Games said that Dukes of Hazzard fans would enjoy the ZX Spectrum version, writing that while it "isn't as spectacular as one of those amazing stunts you see the General Lee perform on TV, it ain't bad either. [...] The graphics are nice and the scrolling pretty smooth." The magazine wrote that the game can become addicting upon getting used to the controls.

Home Computing Weekly, which gave the ZX Spectrum version two stars out of five, called the game "boring", in part because of the inability to change its difficulty settings. The publication noted "the limited graphics are very well-drawn, the sound is simple but effective and machine code ensures a smooth movement of vehicles and scrolling." Three critics for Your Sinclair gave the ZX Spectrum version a negative review, criticizing the controls and poor collision detection, although one reviewer felt that the game had the potential to become a commercial success.

== Cancelled Atari 2600 versions ==
Initially, Atari, Inc. attempted to revamp the graphics of an unreleased Atari 2600 port of their arcade game Stunt Cycle to convert it into a Dukes of Hazzard game. For unknown reasons, Atari abandoned the idea. In November 1982, Atari Age reported about a new video game in development at Atari that would be based on a popular CBS television series, later revealed to be The Dukes of Hazzard, for the Atari 2600.

Mark R. Hahn, the game's sole programmer, had a development team stationed in New York, while the majority of Atari's staff was based in California. Hahn claimed that the California team did not provide much assistance to his team, saying, "There was a lot of competition between the New York and California offices. Nobody from marketing (which was in California) was willing to tell me they didn't like the game. So I did demos of several screens, they said they liked them, and then I got working on game play."

Hahn said the game was still in development in 1983, when Atari, for unknown reasons, chose to have the unfinished game burned onto a large number of ROM chips. Atari abruptly cancelled the game before the chips were to be placed into cartridges and shipped. The game was nearly completed. Atari was not satisfied with the game's graphics, which were lacking in comparison to other games the company was releasing at the time. Hahn only learned of the game's cancellation from the secretary of an Atari VIP, and said, "I had put months of very long days and weekends into the game. I was a bit upset." Atari Age reported the game's cancellation in September 1983.

The game would have had the player control the General Lee, with the goal being to break Daisy out of jail before Boss Hogg can get to her, while also avoiding Sheriff Rosco P. Coltrane and Deputy Enos Strate in their police vehicles. The game contained many glitches and gameplay issues. One of the game's major glitches included Rosco and Enos abruptly ramming the General Lee if it got too close to their vehicles, resulting in the player losing a life.

== See also ==
- Hazard Run
