= Dark Seal =

Data East arcade games

- Japanese arcade flyer
- Developer: Data East
- Publishers: Data East (Arcade); G-Mode (Zeebo); FTEGames (Switch, PS4); Ziggurat Interactive (Windows)
- Directors: Men Taiko (Gate of Doom); Naomi Susa (Wizard Fire)
- Designers: Yoshiyuki Urushibara; Shingo Mitsui & Masao Yahachi (hardware)
- Programmers: Naomi Susa (Gate of Doom); Sōichi Akiyama (Wizard Fire)
- Artists: Shinji Noda; Jun Matsuda; Yoshiyuki Ishibiki (Gate of Doom); Yoshiyuki Ishibiki; Masanori Tokoro; Tomomi Matoba (Wizard Fire)
- Composers: Hiroaki Yoshida; Tatsuya Kiuchi; Kenji Mori (Gate of Doom); Tatsuya Kiuchi; Tomoyoshi Sato; Mihoko Ando (Wizard Fire)
- Platforms: Arcade, Zeebo, Nintendo Switch, PlayStation 4, Microsoft Windows
- Release: 1990/1992: Arcade (Dark Seal); JP: June 28, 1990; NA: July 1990 Arcade (Dark Seal II); JP/NA: 1992; Zeebo; BR: 2010 Switch (Gate of Doom); NA: 15 February 2018 Switch (Wizard Fire); NA: 21 June 2018 PS4 (Gate of Doom); NA: 28 August 2018 Windows (Gate of Doom); WW: 02 March 2021 Windows (Wizard Fire); WW: 24 June 2021 PS4 (Wizard Fire); NA: 27 July 2021
- Genres: Role-playing, beat-'em-up
- Modes: Single-player, multiplayer

Dark Seal (ダークシール) and Dark Seal II (ダークシール II) are isometric role-playing beat-'em-up video games released for arcade by Data East in 1990 and 1992 respectively. The first game was localized in English under the title Gate of Doom and the second one as Wizard Fire.

== Gameplay ==
The players control characters from an isometric perspective and must traverse levels while fighting enemies, avoiding traps, and collecting items as well as spells. The game features two-player cooperative play.

== Ports ==
Like multiple other Data East games, the games were ported to the Zeebo by Onan Games and published by G-Mode in Brazil in 2010. Wizard Fire was also included in the 2010 Wii compilation Data East Arcade Classics by Majesco.

In 2018, FTEGames ported both Gate of Doom and Wizard Fire to the Nintendo Switch's eShop as well as Gate of the Doom to the PlayStation 4 as part of their Johnny Turbo's Arcade series of Data East arcade game ports branded with the character of Johnny Turbo, the Turbo Duo mascot and alter-ego of FTEGames founder Johnny Brandstetter. Ports of both games for Steam, GOG, and Wizard Fire for PS4 were later released in 2021, developed and published by 612 Entertainment and Ziggurat Interactive respectively. FTEGames also lists ports for the Xbox One as under development.

Both Dark Seal and Dark Seal II have been ported to the Evercade system as part of the Data East Arcade 1 collection cartridge.

== Reception ==
In Japan, Game Machine listed Dark Seal on their July 15, 1990 issue as being the most-successful table arcade unit of the month. Game Machine also listed Dark Seal II on their June 15, 1992 issue as being the ninth most-successful table arcade unit of the month.

Both games received positive reviews. Leisure Line magazine reviewed the original game and rated it 10+ out of 10. The sequel was considered a noteworthy improvement overall.

Retrospectively, the original arcade games have been unfavorably compared to the side-scrolling RPG beat-'em-up Dungeons & Dragons: Tower of Doom, which was published by Capcom in 1993.
