= Rohga: Armor Force =

1992 video game

- Arcade flyer
- Developer: Data East
- Publisher: Data East
- Producer: Takaaki Inoue
- Designers: Hironori Kobayashi; Tōru Kikuchi; Copy Suruna
- Programmers: Yasuhiko Nomura; Shinji Hirao; Yasuhiro Matsumoto
- Composers: Hiroaki Yoshida; Akira Takemoto
- Platforms: Arcade, Sega Saturn, PlayStation
- Release: Arcade: JP: February 21, 1992; EU: 1992; PlayStation: JP: May 10, 1996; Sega Saturn: JP: March 28, 1997
- Genre: Run and gun
- Modes: Single-player, multiplayer

Rohga: Armor Force, released in Japan as Wolf Fang (Note: Japanese: ウルフファング 空牙2001, Hepburn: Urufufangu Kuuga 2001), is a 1992 run and gun video game developed and published by Data East for arcades. It is branded as a sequel to Vapor Trail and was itself followed by Skull Fang.

== Plot ==
Two years have passed since the military occupation of New York City in 1999, after which Ragnarok (also known as DAGGER), the organization responsible for the events, disappeared following their airborne destruction. During that time, mech technology became central to military projects worldwide, with major factories located in Oceania. Ragnarok later resurfaced, taking control of military factories and cities in Australia and New Zealand to utilize incomplete mechs.

The USAF and RAAF organize a strike force to reclaim major attacked points in the two countries with the assistance of the best mech operators they can find. Players then assume the role of mech-fighters who aim to liberate Australia or, depending on the player's actions, New Zealand.

== Gameplay ==
Rohga: Armor Force is an unusual scrolling horizontal shooter. Because the players control a mech, the players can hover against slanted walls in the background and occasionally land on higher platforms. Players are set with controls similar to a platformer as they face whichever horizontal direction they choose, can duck, aim their gun upwards at a 45 degree angle, and jump. Players can also move and aim their gun in different directions by holding the firing button down.

Players start along the shores of Australia and proceed to Sydney before being allowed to choose where to go from there. If players continue to explore Australia, then they will have a variety of places to choose from while if they pick New Zealand then they will have even more, different levels to choose from with different settings.

=== Armaments and Weapons ===
As the players control a mech, they have the opportunity to arm the mech with different weapons. There are four types of mechs they can choose from, each one offering different attacks and stage of mobility as they can choose a standard walking mech, a hovering mech, a four-legged mech and a six-wheeled mech. They can even assemble a mech according to armaments and features of their choosing.

Players choose from a similar line-up of weapons from Vapor Trail including the following:

- Vulcan: A rapid-fire, spread-shot auto-cannon.
- Cluster shot: A weapon consisting of green circulating shots that proffer a 'shot-gun effect' type of fire in that it spreads the further it travels.
- Grenade gun: A slow firing, but thoroughly powerful grenade launcher that has the unique ability to destroy most enemy shots.
- Laser gun: A straight firing laser weapon that increases in strength with upgrades, but does not cover a wide range of fire.

Players can also pick-up friendly Oceanic defense force members equipped with semi-automatic rifles and jet packs that mount themselves on the player's mech. Their job is to fire in the player's blind-spots such as from behind and around the mech. Players can hold up to four members at a time, but if hit once by an enemy will lose all of them temporarily.

The player's mech has up to eight points of health that, when completely depleted, forces the player's mech operator to eject safely. While the operator is still armed with the weapon pick-ups the player received, they are reduced to a one-hit kill state.

== Release ==
Wolf Fang: Kuuga 2001 was released in Japanese arcades in 1991. It was released in arcades outside Japan and re-titled Rohga: Armor Force. The arcade versions outside Japan, however, have a number of things cut. There are no story intermissions between the stages and there is no stage selection leading to 4 different endings found on the Japanese version, but the game cycles through all 12 stages like in the Japanese version's expert mode.

The game was released for the PlayStation on May 10, 1996, and to the Sega Saturn on March 28, 1997. Both conversions were developed by Xing Entertainment (famous for the arcade port collection known as Arcade Gears). The console versions have added features such as a new title screen, new introduction, an original redbook audio soundtrack and a staff roll after the endings.

The game was one in numerous acquired by Paon DP after Data East's bankruptcy. In 2010, the game was added to the PlayStation Network to allow users to download to and play either on the PSP or PS3. In 2014, MonkeyPaw Games released it on PSN for Western audiences.

A compilation titled Wolf Fang Skull Fang Saturn Tribute Boosted, which also includes Skull Fang, was developed by City Connection and released in 2025.

Hamster Corporation released the PlayStation version as part of their Console Archives series for the Nintendo Switch 2 and PlayStation 5 in April 2026.

== Reception ==
Reception

Review score
Publication	Score
Famitsu	PS: 22/40

In Japan, Game Machine listed Rohga: Armor Force on their March 15, 1992 issue as being the most-successful table arcade unit of the month.

Japanese gaming magazine Famitsu gave the PlayStation version of the game a score of 22 out of 40.
