= GondoMania =

1987 video game

- Arcade flyer
- Developer: Data East
- Publisher: Data East
- Platform: Arcade
- Release: JP: February 1987; NA: July 1987
- Genre: Multidirectional shooter
- Modes: Single-player, multiplayer

GondoMania, released in Japan as Makyō Senshi (Note: Japanese: 魔境戦士, Hepburn: Makyō Senshi; lit. "Warrior of the Demonic Realm"), is a 1987 multidirectional shooter video game developed and published by Data East for arcades.

== Plot ==
The Gondos, a race of alien beings, steals your significant other and takes them to the planet of thorns. The premise of game is to take down the Gondos though various levels and boss fights. It takes place in a futuristic medieval world and includes dragons and soldiers.

== Gameplay ==
The game was designed for play on a classic arcade console. One button activates the guns, while the other button throws a type of sub-weapon and the joystick allows the player to move in various directions. A rotary joystick allows the player to aim and fire sub-weapons in eight different directions. Similar to other scrolling shooters, GondoMania allows players to progress through ten levels. Enemies in Gondomania drop coins when they are defeated, which allows a player to purchase power-ups. This differs from typical scrolling shooters in that it requires an additional layer of strategy to decide which item to purchase and when as opposed to the typical scrolling shooter where the player receives pre-programmed power-ups.
