= Kokotoni Wilf =

1984 video game

- Publisher: Elite Systems
- Platforms: Amstrad CPC, Commodore 64, ZX Spectrum
- Release: 1984
- Genre: Action-adventure
- Mode: Single-player

Kokotoni Wilf is an action-adventure game released by Elite Systems in 1984 for the Amstrad CPC, Commodore 64, and ZX Spectrum home computers. The game was inspired by Jet Set Willy.

== Gameplay ==
In Kokotoni Wilf, Ulrich the Magician must renew the sleep spell on the lair of dangerous dragons, lest the creatures again awake. To do this he needs the Dragon Amulet, which has been broken into many pieces and scattered across time and space. These pieces must be retrieved and reassembled. Ulrich is too old to undertake the task himself and so has sent his assistant, Kokotoni Wilf, on the mission instead. He has given Wilf magical wings to assist him on his quest.

The game is a 2D flip-screen platformer. The player must guide Kokotoni Wilf through a series of six levels, all set in different historical eras, in search of the pieces of the amulet (which resemble Stars of David). When all the pieces in a level have been collected a timegate will open (a flashing amulet piece) to allow Wilf to travel to the next era. Wilf's journey begins amid dinosaurs in ancient prehistory and ends amid spaceships and robots in the year 2001.

Wilf cannot jump but can fly using his wings. He cannot kill enemies and must evade them instead.

The game was released in conjunction with a competition by Elite Systems. The Magician's purpose in sending Wilf on his mission is only revealed on completion of the game, and the first hundred people to send this information to Elite won a copy of their next game, The Fall Guy, based on the TV series.

== Reception ==
Crash magazine enjoyed the Spectrum version of the game which was described as "a novel looking game which employs well tested routines to make it addictive in play". It was awarded an overall rating of 84%.

Zzap!64 reviewed the budget rerelease of the Commodore 64 version. They thought the game was overly difficult yet was worth a look due to the novelty of the flying and good presentation. It was given a 77% rating.
