= Joe & Mac =

1991 video game

- Japanese arcade flyer
- Developer: Data East (Note: MS-DOS and NES versions developed by Elite Systems; Genesis version developed by Eden Entertainment Software; Amiga and Game Boy versions developed by Motivetime; Zeebo version developed by Onan Games.)
- Publishers: Data East: Super NES, NES; JP/NA: Data East; PAL: Elite Systems MS-DOS; NA: New World Computing; EU: Elite Systems Amiga Elite Systems Genesis Takara Zeebo G-Mode
- Director: Makoto Kikuchi
- Designers: Chiinke; Mitsutoshi Sato; Mya; Osapan
- Artists: Makoto Kawamura; Enomoto; M. Sato; Etsuko T.; Atsushi Kaneko; Chika Shamoto
- Composers: Hiroaki Yoshida; Seiichi Hamada; Takafumi Miura; Yusuke Takahama
- Series: Joe & Mac
- Platforms: Arcade, Super NES, MS-DOS, Amiga, NES, Game Boy, Sega Genesis, Zeebo
- Release: February 1991: Arcade; JP: February 1991; NA: March 1991 Super NES; JP: December 6, 1991; NA: January 1992; PAL: 1992 MS-DOS; NA: 1991; EU: 1991 Amiga; EU: December 1992 NES; NA: December 1992; EU: 1992 Game Boy; NA/UK: April 1993 Genesis; NA: January 1994
- Genre: Platform
- Modes: Single-player, multiplayer

Joe & Mac, (Note: Known in Japan as Joe & Mac: Caveman Combat (Japanese: ジョー&マック 戦え原始人, Hepburn: Jō ando Makku: Tatakae Genshijin)) also known as Caveman Ninja or Caveman Ninja: Joe & Mac, is a 1991 platform video game developed and published by Data East for arcades. It was later ported to the Super Nintendo Entertainment System, MS-DOS, Amiga, Nintendo Entertainment System, Game Boy, Sega Genesis and Zeebo. It was followed by a sequel, Joe & Mac 2: Lost in the Tropics.

== Gameplay ==
Joe fights a Tyrannosaurus in the game's first level using the stone wheel. (Arcade version)

The game stars the green-haired Joe and the blue-haired Mac, cavemen who battle through numerous prehistoric levels using weapons such as boomerangs, bones, fire, flints, electricity, stone wheels, and clubs. The objective of the game is to rescue a group of women who were kidnapped by a rival tribe of cavemen. The game features a health system by which the player loses health over a period of time, apart from during boss battles. A two-player mode is available, and in some versions both characters are capable of damaging each other.

The original arcade version and Amiga, Genesis, MS-DOS and Zeebo ports have the distinction of allowing the player to select between different routes at the end of boss battles. Also, after defeating the final boss, the players can choose between three exits – each one leading to a slightly different ending sequence.

== Ports ==
The game has been ported to various systems, some of which drop the name Caveman Ninja and refer to the game simply as Joe & Mac.

A Super NES version was developed and published by Data East, and was released in Japan on December 6, 1991, followed by North America in January 1992. A version for the NES, developed by Elite Systems and published by Data East, was released in North America in December 1992. A Game Boy version, developed by Motivetime and also published by Data East, was released in North America and the United Kingdom in April 1993. A Sega Genesis version, developed by Eden Entertainment Software and published by Takara, was released in North America in January 1994; this version was published by Tectoy for the Brazilian Mega Drive in early 1994.

The Genesis version is considered a close match to the arcade version. The Super NES version is a reworked game which features an overworld map used to choose the levels (unlike in other versions where all of them have to be played), which were longer, plus some bonus stages (either in the levels or out in the world map). Some of the weapons are missing and can no longer be charged up. The final boss is also different, and there are only two endings. The NES and Game Boy versions lack the option of choosing levels or endings. Both feature variants of the arcade boss.

The Japanese version of the game includes a beginning scene in which cavemen enter a hut and emerge while dragging cavewomen by their hair. The scene was removed from the US release, with Data East stating: "We didn't want kids to see [the Japanese display] and think it was okay".

A compilation of the game and its successors called Joe & Mac Retro Collection was announced by Red Art Games on June 7, 2025, and was released for PlayStation 5, Xbox Series, Nintendo Switch and Windows via Steam on October 29, 2026.

== Reception ==
Reception

Aggregate scores
| Aggregator | Score |
|---|---|
| GameRankings | 75% (Genesis); 65.88% (SNES); 72% (GB) |
| OpenCritic | 53% recommend(Retro Collection) (Note: Based on 17 reviews.) |

Review scores
| Publication | Score |
|---|---|
| AllGame | 3.5/5 (Genesis); 2.5/5 (NES); 2.5/5 (ARC) |
| Amiga Action | 79% (Amiga) |
| Amiga Format | 74% (Amiga) |
| Amiga Power | 22% (Amiga) |
| Electronic Gaming Monthly | 7/10, 8/10, 6/10, 6/10 (SNES) |
| Super Play | 72% (SNES) |
| Total! | 75% (Game Boy) |
| CU Amiga | 78% (Amiga) |
| The One Amiga | 22% (Amiga) |

The One reviewed the arcade version of Caveman Ninja in 1991, calling it "a cutesie 'jumpy-jumpy' game which uses some good graphics and neat comic touches to overcome the unoriginal gameplay", recommending it as being "worth a try".

Skyler Miller of AllGame criticized the NES version for its "unresponsive controls", writing that "jumping and simultaneously throwing your weapon, an important move, is often hard to perform". Miller also wrote that the graphics are average for NES. GamePro wrote that the NES version was colorful but that the graphics "are prehistoric", criticizing the "flat backgrounds and sprites". GamePro also criticized the music, described as "rock-splitting clinks and clanks".

Super Play praised the SNES version for its colorful graphics, but also wrote: "The snag is that there isn't a lot to hold your interest. [...] the appeal starts to flag after a few minutes. The collision detection is annoying as well, tending to give baddies the benefit of the doubt in any clash of heads. I'm afraid this, coupled with the awkward controls, soon saw me adopting a 'couldn't care less' attitude towards the game".

Brett Alan Weiss of AllGame praised the Genesis version's graphics, sound effects and music, but criticized the game's two-player mode. Sega Visions praised the Genesis version's "bright colors and bouncy sounds", but criticized its controls. GamePro, reviewing the Genesis version, noted similarities to the SNES version and praised the "entertaining" two-player mode.

British television program Bad Influence! gave the SNES version 4 out of 5. Tony Dillon of CU Amiga wrote that the game "is a lot of fun to play. Not as complete or polished as Zool, but still a great platform game. Controls are responsive, the graphics are good and the sampled sound is excellent, but I couldn't help feeling that in these times of epic Amiga games, this one is just a little too limited".

Huw Melliar-Smith of Amiga Action reviewed that the animation of the game's enemies "is pretty good. Not spectacular, but good nonetheless. As Joe & Mac are the focus of attention, perhaps a little more effort might have gone into their creation". Melliar-Smith praised the multiplayer option as being superior to single-player mode, and also complimented the sound effects, but called the music repetitive and not creative. Melliar-Smith also criticized the unresponsive controls. Dave Paget of Amiga Format praised its "clear graphics and well-drawn backdrops", but was critical of the linear gameplay.

David Upchurch of The One Amiga called the plot and gameplay "uninspired", also criticizing the graphics (specifically its colour palettes as garrish and sprites appearing in the backgrounds), its unresponsive controls and the game's difficulty, but praised the sound.

Stuart Campbell of Amiga Power criticized the game for using "the kind of options screen that you'd have to be a professional semaphore operator to penetrate. I had to spend almost five minutes reading the manual just to work out how to select which of the two pointlessly-complicated joystick modes I wanted to use [...] and I still haven't quite got to grips with how to toggle the music and sound effects". Campbell also criticized the game's graphics on Amiga, the game's poor control system and its short, tedious levels.

Total! gave the Game Boy version 75%, praising the graphics but criticizing the collision detection. The magazine also criticized the backgrounds, which caused the main character of Joe to blend into the environment, creating confusion regarding his location. Nintendo Power positively wrote about the Game Boy version: "Good graphics and animation rival those of the NES and Super NES versions", but said that the "background blur while walking is severe, making it difficult to see approaching enemies". In 2018, Complex ranked Joe & Mac 69th on their list of "The Best Super Nintendo Games of All Time".

== Legacy ==
The game was followed by various sequels. Joe also appeared in the 1993 Game Boy puzzle game Franky, Joe & Dirk: On the Tiles, along with Franky from Dr. Franken and Dirk the Daring from Dragon's Lair. The Japanese version of the SNES game Congo's Caper was presented as a sequel called Tatakae Genshijin 2: Rookie no Bōken and featured a new protagonist. The title duo would later return in Joe & Mac 2: Lost in the Tropics, which added light role-playing aspects to the series. An arcade sequel titled Joe & Mac Returns eschewed the scrolling action of the original games in favor of gameplay similar to another Data East series, Tumblepop.

Joe and Mac appear in a German Mario comic, titled Super Mario: Verloren in der Zeit.

=== Possible reboot ===
In November 2009, Golgoth Studio announced plans to reboot the Joe & Mac series, following their completion of a Toki remake. No further information was released afterwards and the project has been cancelled as Golgoth Studio closed in 2017.

=== Remake ===
French video game publisher Microids published a remake of the game titled New Joe & Mac – Caveman Ninja. The game was developed by Mr. Nutz Studio and was released for consoles and PC in November 2022.
