= Vapor Trail: Hyper Offence Formation =

1989 video game

Vapor Trail
- North American arcade flyer
- Developer: Data East
- Publishers: Arcade; Data East; Mega Drive / Genesis: JP: Riot; NA: Renovation Products
- Designers: Hironori Kobayashi; Min
- Platforms: Arcade, Mega Drive/Genesis
- Release: Arcade: JP/NA: 1989; Sega Mega Drive: JP: August 2, 1991; NA: October 1991
- Genre: Shoot 'em up
- Modes: Single-player, multiplayer

Vapor Trail: Hyper Offense Formation, known in Japan as Kuuga – Operation Code Vapor Trail (空牙 – Operation Code Vapor Trail) and usually simply referred to as Vapor Trail, is a 1989 shoot 'em up arcade game developed and published by Data East. Vapor Trail was followed by Rohga: Armor Force and Skull Fang.

== Plot ==
In 1999, a terrorist organization known only as DAGGER (Ragnarok in the Japanese release) has occupied the city of New York where they have hacked into military defenses world-wide, established their own military command and gained access to nuclear missile silos. They hold the world hostage in this position and promise to cancel their threats of destroying the Earth only until the world's governments relinquish their power to DAGGER.

A Special Forces Air Unit is called in to attack DAGGER and cripple their strongest defenses and headquarters in New York. Until then, the city remains silent.

== Gameplay ==
The game features 2 players controlling the jet fighters simultaneously for battle across numerous levels. There are 3 types of jets varying from different classes of speeds and firepower. The Silph is the midrange plane with the most balance. While the Valkyrie (modelled after A-10 Thunderbolt II) carries the most firepower, and the Seylen jet is capable of flying as the most agile fighter that its vulcans upgrade can shoot backward. Weapon upgrades are available throughout the game, ranging from homing missiles, ring guns, flame throwers, and many more. Each jet may also activate the shield manually in times of trouble.

=== Weapons ===
Players have a choice between four different standard pick-up weapons: Vulcan – the player's default weapon which fires straight forward, but can flare out to destroy larger groups of enemies depending on the jet selected. Bombs – a straight firing, explosive weapon that retains the same firing pattern for all jets, but increases in launch count (number of times it can be fired at once) when upgraded. Defender – an explosive cluster-shot weapon that encircles the player's jet and remains the same when upgraded, but increases in count much like the Bombs. Missiles – homing missiles that fire from multiple directions of the jet. Similar to the Vulcan, the Missiles fire in different directions depending on the jet that is used.

Every jet is equipped with a roll device that allows them to dodge projectiles and hostiles. The roll must be re-charged after every use. Players also have the choice to pick up the S-Unit, a weapon attachment that empowers the jet's firing no matter what weapon is picked up previously and every jet's S-Unit attack differs from the others. Once the S-Unit is equipped, the player cannot use their previous weapons unless the S-Unit is detonated. Detonating the S-Unit does not harm the player, but it does harm the enemy as the unit will detonate in a large and powerful explosion.

== Mega Drive/Genesis release ==
Vapor Trail was ported in-house by Data East to the Sega Mega Drive/Genesis in 1991. This version was supposed to be published by Data East, but for various reasons this was changed to Telenet Japan which released it in Japan under the Riot label and in the United States through its subsidiary Renovation Products.

The port was very accurate to the arcade counterpart despite much stricter hardware and color limitations. Even the display ratio was maintained during conversion with the addition of the side bars. This port was also featured on the game show Nick Arcade, in the Video Challenge portion of the show. Sound effects from the game were sampled in the Snazin Smith song "Doctor Rhino".

== Reception ==
In Japan, Game Machine listed Vapor Trail on their March 1, 1990 issue as being the second most-successful table arcade unit of the month.

The game was reviewed in 1992 in Dragon #178 by Hartley, Patricia, and Kirk Lesser in "The Role of Computers" column. The reviewers gave the game 3 out of 5 stars.
