= Daikaiju Deburasu =

- Publisher: Data East
- Platform: Family Computer
- Release: JP: December 21, 1990
- Genre: Strategy
- Mode: Single-player

Daikaiju Deburasu (Note: Japanese: 大怪獣デブラス; lit. Giant Monster Flaburas) is a 1990 strategy video game for the Family Computer. The game involves has a kaiju-movie theme, where the player assists the military in guiding a giant egg through a large city and then protecting it from a huge monster that rises from the sea.

The idea of the game developed when Hiromichi Nakamoto of Data East met Haruki Kamiya of Bandai met and developed the idea for the game. It was published by Data East and released on January 21, 1990. While it did not receive an official English release, the game received a partial fan translation in the 1990s and a full translation in 2023.

Reviews in Famicom Tsūshin and Hippon Super! complimented the light-hearted approach to the kaiju genre. Some reviewers found the game might be too difficult for its intended younger audience or that it was hard to strategize moves when movements depended on dice roll.

== Gameplay ==
Daikaiju Deburasu is a single-player strategy video game.

The game has a kaiju-movie theme. It involves the player assisting the military to guide a giant egg through a large city and protecting it from a huge monster that has risen from the sea.

== Development and release ==
Hiromichi Nakamoto of Data East met Haruki Kamiya of Bandai at a game show and became friends. The two agreed to work together on a project which became Daikaiju Deburasu. Most games were created by suggesting ideas and themes they found interesting and then pitching the ideas to their CEOs. For Daikaiju Deburasu, the two even performed a dance which was originally going to be in the game for their CEO.

The game was initially going to be made so that the player could also control the monsters in the game. They opted to make this a secret cheat code in the game, so they could put the code in game magazines later to recoup interest in the game once sales on the title had slowed down.

Daikaiju Deburasu was published by Data East and released in Japan for the Family Computer on December 21, 1990. The game's name "Deburasu" is a pun with "Debu" meaning chubby in Japan. The game did not receive an official release in the West, but received a partial fan translation in the 1990s and a full English fan translation in 2023.

== Release and reception ==
Reception

Review scores
Publication	Score
Famitsu	5/10, 5/10, 7/10, 7/10
Hippon Super!	7/10

Reviewers in Famicom Tsūshin commented on the gameplay, with one saying it lacked strategic depth and may be too difficult for the younger audience the game is aimed at. One reviewer said that throwing dice to move made it too difficult to strategize. One reviewer wrote that it lacked gameplay depth but made up for it with the unique kaiju theme.

Reviewers in Famicom Tsūshin and Hippon Super! complimented the game's light-hearted approach to adapting kaiju film themes to a game. Both publications also complimented the characters with one reviewer in Famicom Tsūshin specifically highlighting the lack of stereotypical characters.

== See also ==
- List of Nintendo Entertainment System games
- Video games in Japan
