= Heavy Barrel =

1987 video game

- US arcade flyer
- Developers: Data East (NES); Quicksilver Software (Apple II, MS-DOS)
- Publisher: Data East
- Designers: Koji Akibayashi; Junichi Watanabe, Kenichi Fujimoto, Hiroyuki Iwabe (hardware)
- Programmers: Men Taiko; Nobusuke Sasaki; Naomi Susa; Satoshi Imamura; Toshinari Ueda
- Artists: Jun Sato; Back Man; Masanori Tokoro; Tomo Adachi; Yoshiyuki Urushibara; Mix Man
- Composers: Azusa Hara; Hiroaki Yoshida
- Platforms: Arcade, Apple II, Nintendo Entertainment System, MS-DOS
- Release: 1987; NES: JP: March 2, 1990
- Genre: Run and gun
- Modes: Single-player, multiplayer

Heavy Barrel (Note: Japanese: ヘビー・バレル, Hepburn: Hebī Bareru) is an overhead run and gun video game released for arcades in 1987 by Data East.

== Gameplay ==
Arcade screenshot

Terrorists have seized the underground control complex of a nuclear missile site, and it is up to the player to infiltrate the base and kill the enemy leader. Players begin armed with a gun with unlimited ammunition and a limited supply of grenades. Improved weapons and grenade powerups are made available within the game, either in plain sight or within crates that must be unlocked using keys. Additionally, crates may contain orbs or one of the six pieces of the Heavy Barrel superweapon. Like SNK's Ikari Warriors, the original arcade version featured 8-way rotary joysticks.

The name of the game is from an in-game weapon. The Heavy Barrel is found in six pieces and is an energy cannon capable of destroying any enemy in the game with a single shot (except the final enemy, and possibly one other boss that may have required two shots). The weapon has a wide arc of fire and can be fired as fast as the player's trigger finger permits, but after thirty seconds its use is exhausted, at which point the bearer reverts to his previous weaponry. The Heavy Barrel is best used to get past tough bosses, and the game only contains enough pieces to allow the weapon to be built three times in a single game. In a two-player game, whoever collects the sixth piece is equipped with the Heavy Barrel.

== Ports ==
Heavy Barrel ports by Quicksilver Software for the Apple II and MS-DOS were released in 1989. The NES port was developed by Data East and released in North America and Japan in 1990. All versions of Heavy Barrel were published by Data East.

In 1989, Heavy Barrel was contracted to be ported to the Commodore 64 by F.A.C.S. (Financial Accounting and Computing Software), a West Bloomfield Township, Michigan company. The graphics engine and much of the gameplay was in place, but the development company folded before the project could be finished.

In February 2010, Majesco published Heavy Barrel for the Wii, as part of Data East Arcade Classics, and for the Zeebo.

== Reception ==
Reception

Review scores
Publication	Score
AllGame	(Arcade) 3.5/5 (NES) 2.5/5
Electronic Gaming Monthly	(NES) 7/10, 7/10, 7/10, 7/10
Famitsu	(NES) 5/10, 6/10, 8/10, 4/10
Video Chums	(Switch) 3/5

In Japan, Game Machine listed Heavy Barrel on their January 15, 1988 issue as being the sixth most-successful table arcade unit of the month. Both Computer and Video Games's Clare Edgeley and ACE's Andy Smith gave an overall positive outlook to the arcade original.
