= Elite Systems =

British video game developer

- Type: Private
- Industry: Computer software Software publishing
- Founded: 1984
- Headquarters: Lichfield, United Kingdom
- Website: www.elite-systems.co.uk

Elite Systems is a British video game developer and publisher established in 1984 as Richard Wilcox Software. It is known for producing home computer conversions of popular arcade games. Elite also published compilations of games on the Hit-Pak label and budget price re-releases on the Encore label.

== History ==
Under the name Richard Wilcox Software, only one title was published: Blue Thunder for the ZX Spectrum, Atari 8-bit computers, and Commodore 64. In August 1984, the group was relaunched as Elite Systems, expanding the team to include graphic designers Rory Green and Jon Harrison; programmers Neil A. Bate, Chris Harvey, Andy Williams and Stephen Lockley; administrators Paul Smith and Pat Maisey; and Wilcox's brother Steve handled sales and marketing. Its first release under the new Elite Systems label was Kokotoni Wilf, which also carried the first of their anti-counterfeiting holograms on the cassette inlay card.

By 1986, the company was developing many home computer licenses of arcade machines. Their Aldridge-based headquarters housed a row of arcade cabinets for games that were being converted. Their hardware had been hacked so the team could analyse the games to ensure an accurate, licensed conversion. Three of their conversions, Commando, Ghosts 'n Goblins and Paperboy, were among the UK's top ten best-selling home video games of 1986.

At the 1986 Golden Joystick Awards, Elite was awarded "Software House of the Year" by Computer and Video Games magazine and received a "Game of the Year" award for Paperboy from the British software industry the following year.

Elite launched its first budget label, £2.99 Classics in July 1986 achieving chart success with re-releases of older titles from other software houses such as Scuba Dive, Full Throttle and Skool Daze. The label was closed before the end of the year when developers took legal action against the company for non-payment of royalties. A new budget label, Encore, was launched in 1988 with its first 5 titles, Airwolf, Bomb Jack, Battleships, Saboteur, and Frank Bruno's Boxing all coming from Elite's back-catalogue.

Elite Systems began creating video games for the NES and Game Boy in the early 1990s through its associated development house MotiveTime.

In 2010, the company began selling versions of classic ZX Spectrum games licensed from the original developers for iOS and Android systems and in January 2014 they announced plans to crowdfund a Spectrum-themed Bluetooth keyboard, the Recreated ZX Spectrum, that would attach to mobile devices. Elite Systems took down the ZX Spectrum: Elite Collection app the following month, due to complaints from authors that they had never been paid royalties. Steve Wilcox responded in a statement on their website where he claimed he was "working towards" making all outstanding payments with 28 days and that the games were being withdrawn from sale in the meantime.

In April 2014, it was reported that Elite Systems had fully repaid the overdue royalties and cancelled the contracts it had with the unpaid developers.

Wired described the finished device, which was styled as an original Spectrum 48k keyboard, as "absolutely gorgeous" but said it was ultimately more of an expensive novelty than an actual Spectrum. In July 2019, Eurogamer reported that many of the orders had yet to be delivered due to a dispute between Elite Systems and their manufacturer, Eurotech.

== List of mobile games ==
- All-new Paperboy - In Development
- Double Dragon II: The Revenge
- R-Type
- Atlantis Quest
- Double Dragon EX
- Paperboy
- Star Warriors
- Alien vs. Predator
- Bomb Jack
- Chuckie Egg

== List of older games ==
- 1942
- 3DC
- 911TS
- A Question of Sport
- Ace
- Ace 2
- Airwolf
- Airwolf 2
- Aquablast
- Battleships
- Batty
- Beyond the Ice Palace
- Blue Thunder
- Bomb Jack
- Bomb Jack II
- Buggy Boy
- Chain Reaction
- Combat Lynx
- Commando
- Complete Onside Soccer
- Deep Strike
- Dirt Racer
- Dogs of War
- Dr. Franken (titled The Adventures of Dr. Franken for the SNES in the United States)
- Dr. Franken II
- Dragon's Lair
- Dragon's Lair: The Legend
- Dukes of Hazzard
- European Championship 1992
- The Fall Guy
- First Strike
- Ford Racing
- Frank Bruno's Boxing
- Ghosts 'n Goblins
- Great Gurianos
- Grand National
- Grand Touring
- Gremlins 2: The New Batch
- Harrier Attack
- Hoppin' Mad
- Ikari Warriors
- Joe & Mac
- Kokotoni Wilf
- Last Battle
- Live And Let Die
- Mighty Bomb Jack
- Mike Read's Computer Pop Quiz
- Nintendo Soccer
- On The Tiles
- Onside Complete Soccer
- Overlander
- Paperboy
- Prince of Persia
- Passing Shot
- Roller Coaster
- Scooby-Doo
- Space Academy
- Space Harrier
- Spitfire
- Storm Warrior
- Strikepoint
- Striker (with Rage Software)
- Supertrux
- Test Drive: Off-Road
- The Fidgetts
- ThunderCats
- Tournament Golf
- Virtuoso
- Wanderer 3D
- World Championship Soccer
- World Cup Striker
