= Darwin 4078 =

1986 video game

- Japanese arcade flyer
- Developer: Data East
- Publishers: Data East (arcade); Hudson Soft (MSX)
- Designer: Tomo Furukawa
- Platforms: Arcade, MSX
- Release: JP: March 1986
- Genre: Scrolling shooter
- Modes: Single-player, multiplayer

Darwin 4078 (Note: Japanese: ダーウィン4078, Hepburn: Dāwin 4078) is a 1986 vertically scrolling shooter video game developed and published by Data East for arcades. It was released only in Japan in March 1986. As the title indicates, Charles Darwin's theory of evolution is incorporated into the gameplay. The game's designer, Tomo Furukawa, would go on to become the vocalist of the band Guniw Tools.

== Gameplay ==
Screenshot of Darwin 4078 (arcade version)

The player controls a spaceship who navigates dimensions and defeats microorganisms. The player is armed with standard ammunition for airborne attacks and a bomb attack for ground enemies. The player can kill microorganisms to earn capsules, which causes the ship to temporarily "evolve" when collected. There are 19 different evolutionary forms which differ in abilities and attack patterns. The player's airborne attacks can be improved indefinitely while their grown attacks receive relatively less enhancement. Failing to collect capsules on time causes the evolutions to wear off, causing the ship to "devolve" level by level over time. Certain evolutions may mutate while being hit by certain enemy projectiles, resulting in powerful forms unavailable through conventional means. A "reverse evolution" form is also available, granting the game's most powerful abilities, such as invincibility and shooting mini versions of itself, with the cost of a tighter time limit.

== Ports & related releases ==
Darwin 4078 was ported to MSX2 in 1987 by Hudson Soft, and bore a similar appearance to the arcade game B-Wings and the NES game Hector '87. A sequel titled SRD: Super Real Darwin (SRDスーパー・リアル・ダーウィン, SRD: Sūpā Riaru Dāwin) (also written as S.R.D.) was released by Data East in 1987, and was ported by Sega on April 8, 1990 for the Sega Mega Drive as Darwin 4081. Act-Fancer: Cybernetick Hyper Weapon (アクトフェンサー, akuto fensā) is not a direct sequel to the game, but bears similarities to Darwin as a side-scrolling action game developed by Data East that uses an evolution system. Darwin 4081 was numbered 4081 because it was the 4th game that used the evolution system after Darwin (4078), S.R.D. (4079), and Act-Fancer (4080). Other similar games include Bio-ship Paladin by UPL and Bermuda Triangle by SNK, which also feature ships that change appearance with power-ups. Hamster Corporation released the game outside Japan for the first time through their Arcade Archives series for the Nintendo Switch and PlayStation 4 in July 2021.

== Reception ==
In Japan, Game Machine listed Darwin 4078 on their April 15, 1986 issue as being the third most-successful table arcade unit of the month.
