= RoboCop (1988 video game) =

- North American arcade flyer
- Developer: Data East (Note: Amiga, Atari ST, Commodore 64, Game Boy, DOS, MSX and ZX Spectrum versions developed by Ocean Software; Apple II version developed by Quicksilver Software; Amstrad CPC version developed by AGC Hamburg; NES version co-developed by Sakata SAS; TRS-80 CoCo version developed by Tandy Corporation.)
- Publishers: Data East: Amiga, Atari ST, C64, CPC, ZX Spectrum; Ocean Software; TRS-80 Coco; Tandy Corporation; Game Boy; NA/EU: Ocean Software; JP: Epic/Sony Records
- Designers: Yoshiyuki Urushibara; Tomo Adachi
- Programmers: Ryōji Minagawa; Mr. Deco Men; Kenji Takahashi; S. Tamura; Masaaki Tamura
- Artists: Tomo Adachi; Asami Kaneko; Mix Man; Yoshinari Kaiho
- Composers: Hiroaki Yoshida; Hitomi Komatsu; Hiroyuki
- Series: RoboCop
- Platform: List: Amstrad CPC, MSX, Commodore 64, arcade, ZX Spectrum, NES, DOS, Apple II, Atari ST, TRS-80 Color Computer, Amiga, Game Boy
- Release: 1988: Amstrad CPC, MSX; EU: 1988 C64; EU: 1988; NA: 1989 Arcade; JP: January 1989; NA: February 1989 ZX Spectrum; UK: 1988 NES; JP: 25 August 1989; NA: December 1989; EU: 25 April 1991 DOS; NA: November 1989 Apple II; NA: December 1989 Atari ST; EU: 1989 TRS-80 CoCo; NA: 1989 Amiga; EU: 1989; NA: November 1989 Game Boy; NA: December 1990; EU: 1990; JP: 1 March 1991
- Genres: Beat 'em up, run and gun, Scrolling shooters
- Modes: Single-player; Multiplayer (not in all versions)
- Arcade system: Data East MEC-M1

RoboCop is a 1988 video game developed and published by Data East for arcades and Ocean Software for home computers, based on the 1987 film of the same name. It was sub-licensed to Data East by Ocean Software, who obtained the game rights from Orion Pictures during the film's script stage. Data East and Ocean Software worked in conjunction with each other to release games for the arcade and home computers respectively for a joint release, with the home computer versions translating the sections that Data East had shown Ocean from an early unfinished build of the game which Ocean then had to expand upon.

The game was a critical and commercial success. The arcade game was the highest-grossing arcade game of 1988 in Hong Kong, and reached number two on Japan's monthly Game Machine arcade charts. On home computers, the game sold over 1 million copies worldwide, and was especially successful in the United Kingdom, where it was the best-selling home computer game of the 1980s.

== Gameplay ==
Arcade screenshot

The gameplay is similar to Data East's arcade game Bad Dudes Vs. DragonNinja, released earlier the same year. Robocop includes elements from both beat 'em up and run and gun video games.

== Release ==
During development of the arcade game in 1988, Ocean worked on bringing the computer version of the property to 8-bit home computers, converting what was made available to them at the time while also adding original content to make it different from the arcade original. This version was produced for the Commodore 64, MSX, ZX Spectrum, TRS-80 Color Computer 3, Amstrad CPC, and MS-DOS, meaning that home computers ended up with two different versions of RoboCop for North American and European audiences.

Ports for the Apple II, Amiga, and Atari ST; ports for DOS, NES, and TRS-80 Color Computer 3 followed in 1989. The Apple II and IBM PC ports were developed by Quicksilver Software, while the Amiga and Atari ST versions were developed directly by Ocean. The NES version was developed primarily by Data East with programming handled by Sakata SAS Co, and Ocean ported and published a version for the Game Boy in 1990. A port of the game for the Atari Jaguar was planned but never released.

== Reception ==
Reception

Review scores
Publication	Score
Crash	92%
Computer and Video Games	95%
Famitsu	5/10, 6/10, 7/10, 4/10 (GB)
Sinclair User	94%
Your Sinclair	8/10
ACE	807/1000
The Games Machine	81%

Awards
Publication	Award
Crash	Crash Smash
Computer and Video Games	Game of the Month

RoboCop was a commercial success in arcades, especially in Hong Kong where it was the highest-grossing arcade game of 1988. In Japan, Game Machine listed RoboCop as the second most successful table arcade unit of January 1989.

On home computers, the game sold over 1 million copies worldwide. It was especially successful in the United Kingdom, where it was the best-selling home computer game of the 1980s. The ZX Spectrum version in particular was the best-selling home video game of 1989. The ZX Spectrum RoboCop was one of the biggest selling games of all time on that platform and remained in the Spectrum software sales charts for over a year and a half; it entered the charts in December 1988 and was still in the top five in February 1991. It also topped the UK all-format full price charts for a record 36 weeks until it was knocked off the number one position by Indiana Jones and the Last Crusade in August 1989.

The arcade game was critically well-received. The ZX Spectrum version also achieved critical acclaim, receiving a CRASH Smash award from CRASH, 94% in Sinclair User and Your Sinclair gave 8.8 out of 10, also placing it at number 94 in the Your Sinclair official top 100. The overall opinion was that it captures the original material, with smooth scrolling and animation, sampled speech and sound effects highlighted.

The readers of YS voted it the 9th best game of all time.

The title theme of the Ocean Software versions (composed by Jonathan Dunn) has become well known for its serene, calm tune, which heavily contrasted the tone of both the actual game and the source material; the version of the theme heard in the Game Boy port was later licensed by European kitchen appliance company Ariston for use in a series of TV adverts. The song was also used as the theme song for Charlie Brooker's documentary How Videogames Changed the World, and was one of Brooker's selections on Desert Island Discs. A cover of the theme was also used as the music for the Internet short Dilbert 3 and was sampled in Lil B's song "In Down Bad" from his mixtape White Flame.
