= SRD: Super Real Darwin =

1987 video game

- Japanese arcade flyer
- Developers: Data East; Sega (Mega Drive)
- Publishers: Data East; Sega (Mega Drive)
- Platforms: Arcade, Mega Drive
- Release: Arcade: JP: 1987; Mega Drive: JP: April 7, 1990
- Genre: Scrolling shooter
- Modes: Single-player, multiplayer

SRD: Super Real Darwin (Note: Japanese: SRDスーパーリアルダーウィン, Hepburn: SRD: Sūpā Riaru Dāwin) is a 1987 vertical scrolling shooter video game developed and published by Data East for arcades. It is the sequel to Data East's 1986 arcade game Darwin 4078.

== Gameplay ==
The player takes control of a small fighter ship capable of mutating into different shapes. The ship's appearance will change with upgraded weapons as the player obtains more power-ups.

== Plot ==
The story starts on the planet Lakya where the technologically advanced inhabitants unwittingly unleash the planet's life force known as Evol. As the released Evol drifts from planet Lakya, it is received by the inhabitants of the nearby planet Cokyo; the people of Cokyo initiate the Shlohe project, a plan to use their captured Evol to develop advanced biologic ships and weapons to invade planet Lakya. The inhabitants of Lakya retaliate against the Cokyo invasion by using their own evolving fighter ships.

== Ports ==
SRD: Super Real Darwin was later ported by Sega for the Sega Mega Drive console in 1990 under the title Darwin 4081 (ダーウィン4081). In 2010, a Wii compilation titled Data East Arcade Classics was released and includes the arcade version of SRD: Super Real Darwin.

== Reception ==
In Japan, Game Machine listed Super Real Darwin on their December 1, 1987 issue as being the third most-successful table arcade unit of the year.
