= Congo's Caper =

1992 video game

- North American box art
- Developer: Data East
- Publisher: Data East
- Composers: Emi Shimizu; Seiji Momoi; Seiji Yamanaka
- Platform: Super Nintendo Entertainment System
- Release: JP: December 18, 1992; NA: May 1993; EU: 1993
- Genre: Platform
- Mode: Single-player

Congo's Caper (Note: Known in Japan as Caveman Combat 2: The Adventures of Rookie (Japanese: 戦え原始人2 ルーキーの冒険, Hepburn: Tatakae Genshijin 2: Rūkī no Bōken)) is a 1992 platform video game developed and published by Data East for the Super Nintendo Entertainment System. A North American version was released in May 1993. It was later released on the Nintendo Switch via the Nintendo Classics service on May 26, 2022.

The game was included along with its predecessor and successor games in a compilation called Joe & Mac Retro Collection, released for modern consoles on October 29, 2026.

== Gameplay ==
The plot of Congo's Caper involves a half-human, half-monkey boy named Congo, who sets out on a quest to rescue his girlfriend after she is abducted by a demon. The player controls Congo. Congo's Caper is played across 35 levels that take place in multiple worlds, including a jungle, a mountain range, a pirate ship, a volcano, and a ghost town. The bosses include the demon, a T-Rex, a ninja, a pirate, a mad scientist, and a vampire. If Congo is hit by an enemy, he reverts to his monkey form. If Congo is hit again, the player loses a life.

== Reception ==
Reception

Aggregate score
Aggregator	Score
OpenCritic	53% recommend(Retro Collection) (Note: Based on 17 reviews.)

Review scores
Publication	Score
GameFan	83.5% (Note: In GameFan's review, four critics scored Congo's Caper differently: 86%, 85%, 81%, and 82%.)
Power Unlimited	80/100

Nintendo Power praised the game's graphics, controls, password feature, and variety of levels, but wrote: "The game doesn't really do anything that Super Mario World and countless other games have done just as well". AllGame rated Congo's Caper three and a half stars out of five. Power Unlimited gave the game a score of 80% writing: "Congo's Caper is a fun, varied platform game. Yet it is not a game that will be remembered by anyone as a seasoning. The controls are too stiff for that, and the levels are too easy for that".
