= List of Data East games =

This is a list of video and pinball games released by Data East.

== Video games ==
=== Arcade ===
- Super Break (1978)
- Space Fighter (1978)
- Super Break 2 (1978)
- Astro Fighter (1979)
- Mad Alien (1980, a.k.a. Mad Rider and Highway Chase)
- Terranean (1980)
- Tomahawk 777 (1980)
- Lock 'n' Chase (1981)
- Tournament Pro Golf (1981, a.k.a. Pro Golf and 18 Hole Pro Golf)
- Treasure Island (1981)
- BurgerTime (1982)
- Bump 'n' Jump (1982)
- Disco No. 1 (1982)
- Angler Dangler a.k.a. Fishing (1982)
- Zoar (1982, a.k.a. Mission X)
- Pro Tennis (1982)
- Bega's Battle (1983, LaserDisc)
- Boomer Rang'r (1983)
- Tag Team Wrestling (1983)
- Pro Bowling (1983)
- Pro Soccer (1983)
- Rootin' Tootin' (1983, a.k.a. La-Pa-Pa)
- Super Doubles Tennis (1983)
- B-Wings (1984)
- Cobra Command (1984, LaserDisc)
- Fighting Ice Hockey (1984)
- Kamikaze Cabbie (1984, a.k.a. Yellow Cab)
- Karate Champ (1984)
- Kung-Fu Master (1984, publisher in US only)
- Liberation (1984, a.k.a. Dual Assault)
- Mysterious Stones (1984)
- Peter Pepper's Ice Cream Factory (1984)
- Scrum Try (1984)
- Zaviga (1984)
- Chanbara (1985)
- Competition Golf (1985)
- Metal Clash (1985)
- Performan (1985)
- Pro Baseball Skill Tryout (1985)
- Ring King (1985)
- Road Blaster (1985)
- Shootout (1985)
- Zero Target (1985)
- BreakThru (1986)
- Darwin 4078 (1986)
- Express Raider (1986, a.k.a. Western Express)
- Fire Trap (1986)
- Last Mission (1986)
- Lock-On (1986, publisher in US only)
- Shackled (1986)
- Side Pocket (1986)
- Zippy Bug (1986)
- Captain Silver (1987)
- Garyo Retsuden (1987)
- GondoMania (1987)
- Heavy Barrel (1987)
- Karnov (1987)
- Oscar: Psycho-Nics (1987)
- Pocket Gal (1987)
- The Real Ghostbusters (1987)
- SRD: Super Real Darwin (1987)
- Wonder Planet (1987)
- Bad Dudes Vs. DragonNinja (1988)
- Birdie Try (1988)
- Bloody Wolf (1988)
- Chelnov (1988)
- Cobra Command (1988)
- RoboCop (1988)
- Stadium Hero (1988)
- Act-Fancer: Cybernetick Hyper Weapon (1989)
- Hippodrome (1989, a.k.a. Fighting Fantasy)
- Midnight Resistance (1989)
- Sly Spy (1989)
- Vapor Trail: Hyper Offence Formation (1989)
- Super Volleyball (1989, publisher in US only)
- Boulder Dash (1990) (not to be confused with the 1985 DECO Cassette System game)
- The Cliffhanger: Edward Randy (1990)
- Gate of Doom (Dark Seal) (1990)
- Super BurgerTime (1990)
- Trio the Punch (1990)
- Batman (1990) (developed by Atari Games and Midway Games)
- Captain America and the Avengers (1991)
- China Town (1991)
- Desert Assault (1991)
- Hop A Tic Tac Toe (1991) (electromechanical)
- Joe & Mac (1991)
- Lemmings (1991, Arcade prototype version)
- Mutant Fighter (1991)
- RoboCop 2 (1991)
- Rohga: Armor Force (1991)
- Tumblepop (1991)
- Two Crude (1991)
- Boogie Wings (1992)
- Diet Go! Go! (1992)
- Dragon Gun (1992)
- Funky Jet (published by Mitchell outside Japan) (1992)
- Nitro Ball (1992)
- Pocket Gal Deluxe (1992)
- Wizard Fire (Dark Seal II) (1992)
- Fighter's History (1993)
- Heavy Smash (1993)
- High Seas Havoc (1993)
- Night Slashers (1993)
- Spinmaster (1993)
- Karnov's Revenge (1994)
- Joe & Mac Returns (1994)
- Locked 'n Loaded (1994)
- Street Slam (1994)
- Tattoo Assassins (1994, unreleased)
- Windjammers (1994)
- Avengers in Galactic Storm (1995)
- Backfire! (1995)
- Dunk Dream 95 (1995, a.k.a. Hoops 96)
- Magical Drop (1995)
- Outlaws of the Lost Dynasty (1995)
- World Cup Volleyball '95 (1995)
- Air Walkers (1996, unreleased)
- Ghostlop (1996, unreleased)
- Janken Game Acchi Muite Hoi! (1996, redemption game)
- Magical Drop II (1996)
- Mausuke no Ojama the World (1996)
- Skull Fang (1996)
- Stadium Hero '96 (1996)
- Magical Drop III (1997)

=== Famicom/Nintendo Entertainment System ===
- B-Wings (1985)
- BurgerTime (1985)
- Bump 'n' Jump (1986)
- Karate Champ (1986)
- Tag Team Pro Wrestling (1986)
- BreakThru (1987)
- Golf Club: Birdie Rush (1987)
- Karnov (1987)
- Kid Niki: Radical Ninja (1987)
- Ring King (1987)
- Santa Claus no Takarabako (1987)
- Side Pocket (1987)
- Tantei Jingūji Saburō: Shinjuku Chūō Kōen Satsujin Jiken (1987)
- Tōjin Makyō Den: Hercules no Eikō (1987)
- Captain Silver (1988)
- Cobra Command (1988)
- Donald Land (1988)
- Pachinko Grand Prix (1988)
- Rampage (1988)
- Soccer League - Winner's Cup (1988)
- Tantei Jingūji Saburō: Kiken na Futari - Zenpen (1988)
- Tantei Jingūji Saburō: Yokohama-kō Renzoku Satsujin Jiken (1988)
- Al Unser Jr.'s Turbo Racing (1989)
- Bad Dudes (1989)
- Hercules no Eikō II: Titan no Metsubō (1989)
- Home Run Night (1989)
- Tantei Jingūji Saburō: Kiken na Futari - Kōhen (1989)
- Caveman Games (1990)
- Daikaijyu Deburasu (1990)
- Dash Galaxy in the Alien Asylum (1990)
- Heavy Barrel (1990)
- Home Run Night '90 (1990)
- Tantei Jingūji Saburō:Toki no Sugiyuku Mama ni... (1990)
- Little Magic (1990)
- Werewolf: The Last Warrior (1990)
- Bo Jackson Baseball (1991)
- Captain America and the Avengers (1991)
- Dark Lord (1991)
- Metal Max (1991)
- Joe & Mac (1992)

=== Game Boy series ===
- Lock 'n' Chase (1990)
- Side Pocket (1990)
- Nail 'n' Scale (1990)
- BurgerTime Deluxe (1991)
- Heracles no Eikō: Ugokidashita Kamigami (1992)
- Tumblepop (1992)
- Joe & Mac (1993)
- Captain America and the Avengers (1994)
- Magical Drop III (2000)

=== Super NES ===
- Joe & Mac (1991)
- Congo's Caper (1992)
- Heracles no Eikō III: Kamigami no Chinmoku (1992)
- Super Birdie Rush (1992)
- ABC Monday Night Football (1993)
- Captain America and the Avengers (1993)
- Dragon's Lair (1993)
- Metal Max 2 (1993)
- Sengoku (1993)
- Shadowrun (1993)
- Side Pocket (1993)
- Fighter's History (1994)
- Heracles no Eikō IV: Kamigami kara no Okurimono (1994)
- Joe & Mac 2: Lost in the Tropics (1994)
- Fighter's History: Mizoguchi Kiki Ippatsu!! (1995)
- Magical Drop (1995)
- Metal Max Returns (1995)
- Motteke Oh! Dorobou (1995)
- Magical Drop II (1996)

=== Amiga ===
- Batman: The Caped Crusader (1988)
- Chamber of the Sci-Mutant Priestess (1989)
- ABC Wide World of Sports Boxing (1991)

=== PC Engine/TurboGrafx-16 ===
- Bloody Wolf (1989)
- Makai Hakkenden Shada (1989)
- Winning Shot (1989)
- Drop Rock Hora Hora (1990)
- Override (1991)
- Silent Debuggers (1991)

=== Master System ===
- Captain Silver (1988)

=== Mega Drive/Genesis ===
- SRD: Super Real Darwin (1990)
- Midnight Resistance (1991)
- Vapor Trail: Hyper Offence Formation (1991)
- Captain America and the Avengers (1992)
- Chelnov (1992)
- Side Pocket (1992)
- Two Crude Dudes (1992)
- Dashin' Desperados (1993)
- High Seas Havoc (1994)
- Joe & Mac (1994)
- Mega Turrican (1994)
- OutRunners (1994)
- Minnesota Fats: Pool Legend (1995)
- Virtua Fighter 2 (1996)

=== Game Gear ===
- Captain America and the Avengers (1993)
- Side Pocket (1994)

=== Mega LD ===
- Strahl (1993)

=== Sega CD ===
- Panic! (1994)

=== Sega Saturn ===
- Dark Legend (1995)
- Magical Drop (1995)
- Minnesota Fats: Pool Legend (1995)
- Strahl (1995)
- Creature Shock (1996)
- Defcon 5 (1996)
- Magical Drop II (1996)
- Skull Fang (1996)
- Suiko Enbu: Fuunsaiki (1996)
- Tantei Jingūji Saburō:Mikan no Report (1996)
- Wizardry: VI and VII Complete (1996)
- Karnov's Revenge (1997)
- Magical Drop III (1997)
- Rohga: Armor Force (1997)
- Side Pocket 3 (1997)
- Voice Idol Maniacs: Pool Bar Story (1997)
- Doukoku Soshite... (1998)
- Doukoku Soshite... Final Edition (1998)
- Tantei Jingūji Saburō:Yume no Owari ni (1998)

=== Dreamcast ===
- Revive... Sosei (1999)
- Zombie Revenge (1999)
- Nettou Golf (2000)

=== Neo Geo AES ===
- Karnov's Revenge (1994)
- Spinmaster (1994)
- Street Slam (1994)
- Windjammers (1994)
- Ghostlop (1996)
- Magical Drop II (1996)
- Magical Drop III (1997)

=== Neo Geo CD ===
- Karnov's Revenge (1994)
- Street Slam (1995)
- Windjammers (1995)
- Magical Drop II (1996)

=== Neo Geo Pocket Color ===
- Magical Drop Pocket (1999)

=== PlayStation ===
- Outlaws of the Lost Dynasty (1995)
- Creature Shock (1996)
- Defcon 5 (1996)
- Rohga: Armor Force (1996)
- Tantei Jingūji Saburō:Mikan no Report (1996)
- Magical Drop III: Yokubari Tokudaigou! (1997)
- Soukyugurentai: Oubushutsugeki (1997)
- Voice Idol Collection: Pool Bar Story (1997)
- Tantei Jingūji Saburō:Yume no Owari ni (1998)
- Side Pocket 3 (1998)
- Magical Drop III (1999)
- Magical Drop F: Daibōken Mo Rakujyanai! (1999)
- Tantei Jingūji Saburō: Early Collection (1999)
- Tantei Jingûji Saburô: Tomoshibi ga kienu ma ni (1999)

=== Wonderswan ===
- Magical Drop for WonderSwan (1999)
- Side Pocket for WonderSwan (1999)

=== Mobile ===
- Caveman Ninja (Joe and Mac) (2021)

== Pinball games ==
Name	Year released	Lead designer(s)	Licensed from	Ref.
Laser War	1987	Joe Kaminkow		
Secret Service	1988			
Torpedo Alley	1988			
Time Machine	1988			
Playboy 35th Anniversary	1989			
Monday Night Football	1989			
RoboCop	1989			
The Phantom of the Opera	1990	Joe Kaminkow and Ed Cebula		
King Kong (Note: Never officially released by Data East)				
Back to the Future the Pinball	1990	Joe Kaminkow and Ed Cebula		
The Simpsons	1990	Joe Kaminkow and Ed Cebula		
Checkpoint	1991	Joe Kaminkow and Ed Cebula		
Teenage Mutant Ninja Turtles	1991	Joe Kaminkow and Ed Cebula		
Batman	1991			
Star Trek	1991	Joe Kaminkow and Ed Cebula		
Joel Silver (Note: Mod of Star trek)				
Hook	1992			
Lethal Weapon 3	1992	Joe Kaminkow and Ed Cebula		
Michael Jordan (Note: Mod of Lethal Weapon 3)				
Aaron Spelling (Note: Mod of Lethal Weapon 3)				
Star Wars	1992	John Borg		
Adventures of Rocky and Bullwinkle and Friends	1993			
Jurassic Park	1993	Ed Cebula, Neil Falconer, and Joe Kaminkow		
Last Action Hero	1993	Lonnie D. Ropp and John Carpenter		
Arnon Milchan (Note: Mod of Last Action Hero)	1993			
Tales from the Crypt	1993			
The Who's Tommy Pinball Wizard	1994	Joe Kaminkow and Ed Cebula		
Richie Rich (Note: Mod of The Who's Tommy Pinball Wizard)				
WWF Royal Rumble	1994	Tim Seckel and Joe Kaminkow		
Guns N’ Roses	1994	Joe Kaminkow and John Borg		
Maverick	1994			
