= Video Challenger =

Home video game console

- Developer: Select Merchandise Inc
- Manufacturer: Takara / Bandai (United Kingdom) / Irwin Toy (Canada) / GiG
- Type: Home video game console
- Generation: Third generation
- Released: 1987
- Media: VHS tape

The Video Challenger (Japanese: ビデオチャレンジャー, Hepburn: Bideocharenjā) is a home video game console that was produced by Takara (now Takara Tomy) in 1987. It uses special VHS tape-based footage that allows players to shoot targets with a ray gun.

== Description ==
The object of each game played using a VHS tape and a ray gun is to determine how many targets are hit at the end of the VHS tape. Takara ended production of the Video Challenger due to the success of the NES and the release of the TurboGrafx-16 and Genesis.

== Hardware ==
It uses only the gun known as the "Challenge Blaster". When the trigger is pulled together the muzzle to the target, combining with the image of the dedicated video software, the score is added.

Target with (usually score, high score, damage) the blinking pattern of three kinds. Score is displayed on the counter installed in the Challenge Blaster. When all targets in one round are successfully hit, player will enter a bonus round, which will double the number of points. Bonus round ends after a certain period of time. If the muzzle is facing the damage pattern in the video without pulling the trigger, the score will be penalized.

== List of titles released ==
- Space Challenge (built-in game)
- Thunder Storm (Data East)
- Road Blaster (Data East)
- Godzilla Challenger 1 and 2
- Sky Wars (Original work by Publisher Select Merchandise Inc.)
- After Burner II (Sega)
- Turtle Challenge (based on the Teenage Mutant Ninja Turtles franchise)

== Other ==
Beginning in October 1987, the Video Challenger was given a cross-promotion through the anime, Transformers: The Headmasters, based on the Transformers toyline, both also produced and manufactured by Takara, respectively. Starting from the episode, "Explosion on Mars!! Maximus Is in Danger", the title sequence was changed to show many of the Decepticons flickering white, which was used to signal them as targets, much like in the actual Video Challenger games. If said Decepticons were shot with the Challenge Blaster, the hits would be recorded as points in the system. Aside from the title sequence change, the Challenge Blaster as well as the game itself can be seen respectively used as an actual weapon and played by the character of Daniel Witwicky.
