= Cobra Command (disambiguation) =

Cobra Command is the fictional nemesis of the G.I. Joe team.

Cobra Command may also refer to:

- Cobra Command (1984 video game), a 1984 interactive movie game
- Cobra Command (1988 video game), a 1988 side-scrolling shoot 'em up
