= Hoshizora Kiseki =

2006 Japanese original video animation

- The Japanese DVD cover of Hoshizora Kiseki

星空キセキ
- Created by: Toshikazu Matsubara
- Original net animation
- Directed by: Akio Watanabe; Toshikazu Matsubara
- Produced by: Kouichirou Itou
- Written by: Kouichirou Itou; Toshikazu Matsubara
- Music by: Jun Abe; Seiji Mutou
- Studio: CoMix Wave Films
- Licensed by: NA: Sentai Filmworks
- Released: June 21, 2006
- Runtime: 28 minutes

Hoshizora Kiseki (星空キセキ; lit. Starry-sky Miracle) is a 27-minute Japanese anime directed by Akio Watanabe and Toshikazu Matsubara, and produced by CoMix Wave Films as an original net animation. It was made available online on June 21, 2006, and then was released on DVD in Japan on August 3, 2006. It was screened at the Waterloo Festival on November 16, 2006. The OVA was released on DVD along with the Coffee Samurai OVA on May 10, 2011, by Section 23 Films. Anime Network shows both Hoshizora Kiseki and Coffee Samurai.

== Plot summary ==
Kozue loves to stargaze and does so regularly. On a trip to view a meteorite, she happens to meet a boy named Ginga. He has a mysterious ability to discover more information about the stars, which he uses to help scientists with astronomical research. Unfortunately, his life is mostly dictated for him, and when carrying out missions, he must always wear a protective suit. Kozue helps Ginga to gradually take control of his life by encouraging him to make his own decisions.

== Characters ==
- Ginga

Voiced by: Kyouko Chikiri

- Kozue

Voiced by: Yumiko Hosono
