= Janken Game Acchi Muite Hoi! =

1996 arcade game

- Developer: Data East
- Publisher: Data East
- Designer: Akio Watanabe (character design)
- Platform: Arcade
- Release: 1996
- Genre: Redemption game
- Mode: Single-player

Janken Game Acchi Muite Hoi! (ジャンケンゲーム あっちむいてホイ！) is a 1996 Japanese redemption arcade game developed by Data East. The game is based on jan ken pon, the Japanese variant of rock paper scissors.

== Gameplay ==
Players compete against up to four opponents: Tama, a cat; Tomomi, a schoolgirl; Maiko, a geisha; and Bunta, a fisherman.

Each round begins with a game of rock paper scissors, followed by a directional challenge known as "acchi muite hoi" (lit. Look over there!), in which the winner points in a direction and the loser attempts to avoid looking in that direction. Players use the two buttons embedded in the cabinet's joystick to select their moves and directions. Choosing not to look or point in any direction slows the pace of the game, while repeatedly winning increases the pace. Players advance to the next opponent after winning a predetermined number of rounds within the time limit. Subsequent rounds become faster with a decreased time limit.

If a player runs out of time after winning at least one round, or beats all four opponents, they are offered a "last chance" game in which they must correctly guess one of two directions. The machine dispenses a prize at the end of gameplay regardless of the outcome, variously described as a card, stickers, or candy.

== Development ==
Janken Game Acchi Muite Hoi! was advertised in the February 15, 1996 issue of the Japanese amusement industry publication Game Machine, as part of the company's lineup for the 1996 AOU Amusement Expo.

The game's characters were designed and animated by Akio Watanabe, who also produced their cutscene animations. In an October 2025 interview with Game*Spark, Watanabe recalled that Tama and Maiko were originally intended to be the principal characters. Maiko was the first character he designed and appeared in the game's early promotional artwork. Watanabe also stated that Tomomi's design was influenced by the work of illustrator Range Murata, particularly his character designs for the Power Instinct series.

Watanabe recalled that the game's backgrounds and background characters were produced by Data East's internal development staff, rather than himself. He also described Tama's appearance as a physical figure on the cabinet as the first three-dimensional realization of one of his original characters.

=== Release ===
According to Watanabe, the game underwent location testing at an arcade in Ikebukuro, Tokyo, where it was available for several days. He recalled playing the completed game twice, once at Data East's headquarters and once during the location test.

Watanabe stated that the game's planned commercial distribution was halted after its prize-dispensing cabinet failed to satisfy applicable regulations. He recalled hearing that a small number of cabinets were subsequently distributed to local inns several years later. As a result, the game never received a conventional commercial release.

== Legacy ==
In September 2025, gameplay footage featuring Tomomi attracted renewed attention after appearing in recommendations to numerous YouTube users.

The renewed attention led Game*Spark to interview Watanabe about the game's development in October 2025. Watanabe expressed surprise that the game had gained recognition decades after its creation, given its limited distribution.
