= Side Pocket 3 =

1997 video game

- Sega Saturn cover art
- Developer: Data East
- Publisher: Data East
- Series: Side Pocket
- Platforms: Sega Saturn; PlayStation
- Release: Sega Saturn: JP: July 18, 1997; Satakore: JP: November 19, 1998; PlayStation: JP: April 16, 1998
- Genre: Cue sports
- Modes: Single-player; Multiplayer

Side Pocket 3 (Japanese: サイドポケット３, Hepburn: Saido Poketto 3) is a Japan-exclusive pocket billiards video game for the Sega Saturn and PlayStation. Like its predecessor, Side Pocket 2, it features a real-life professional pool player. In this case, it is JPBA member, Kyoko Sone. The game is the third and final installment of the Side Pocket series.

== Gameplay ==
Side Pocket 3 (Sega Saturn version), showing an overhead view of the table.

Unlike the previous installments in the Side Pocket series, Side Pocket 3 renders the pool room environment with 3D polygons. In spite of this, the table can still be viewed in a traditional, top-down perspective.

Play modes consist of: story mode, training mode, trick game mode, and versus mode. Game variants include eight ball, nine ball, rotation, 14.1 continuous, bowlliards, cutthroat, carom billiards, poker, pocket game (a homage to the original game), and yotsudama.

== Reception ==
Weekly Famitsu gave the PlayStation version a 25 out of 40, claiming that it was more or less the same as its Sega Saturn counterpart.

Brazilian magazine Ação Games gave the Saturn version an 8 out of 10.

== See also ==
- Side Pocket
