= Akio Watanabe =

Japanese anime filmmaker

- 渡辺 明夫
- Born: July 27, 1969 (age 57); Tokyo, Japan
- Other name: Poyoyon♥Rock
- Occupations: Animator; Character designer
- Employers: Nakamura Production (1986–?); AIC (2 months); Studio Hibari (~1997) Frontwing (2013~present)

Akio Watanabe (渡辺 明夫, Watanabe Akio; born July 27, 1969) is a Japanese animator, illustrator, character designer, supervisor, director, dōjin artist, and a member of the circle Pokopii (ぽこぴー). His pseudonym is Poyoyon♥Rock (ぽよよん♥ろっく). He worked with Akiyuki Shinbo at Shaft. His representative works include key animation for Popotan, and character design for Nurse Witch Komugi, The SoulTaker, and Monogatari.

== Filmography ==
=== Under the name Akio Watanabe ===
Anime

- Etotama (original character design)
- Fireworks (character design)
- Grisaia: Phantom Trigger the Animation (character designer, chief animation director)
- Higurashi When They Cry - Gou and Sotsu (character design)
- Hoshizora Kiseki (director, script, character design, storyboard, animation direction, color design)
- Magical Kanan (character design)
- Monogatari (chief animation director, character design)
- Nurse Witch Komugi (character design)
- Pretty Rhythm: Aurora Dream (original character design)
- Rumble Garanndoll (original character design)
- The SoulTaker (character design)
- Starship Girl Yamamoto Yohko (character design)
- The World God Only Knows (character design)
- Zaregoto (character design)

Video games

- The Fruit of Grisaia (character design)
- L no Kisetsu
- Missing Blue
- With Me Every Time (animation director, character design)
- Janken Game Acchi Muite Hoi! (character design)
- Kantai Collection (character design)

Others

- Hoshiiro Girldrop Anthology (cover art)
- 22/7 (original character design for Yuki Tojo)
- PeroPero☆Teacher (director, character design)

=== Under the name Poyoyon♥Rock ===
Anime

- Djibril – The Devil Angel (episode 2 opening movie)
- Netrun-mon
- Popotan (character design)

Video games

- Akiba's Trip: Undead & Undressed (character design)
- Angels in the Court
- Let's Fish! Hooked On
- Popotan
- To Heart 2 (opening movie)
- Queen's Blade: Spiral Chaos (character design)
- Queen's Gate: Spiral Chaos (character design)

Trading card

- Aquarian Age

Others

- "Akiba Kei SNS 'Filn'" Mascot characters Fil and Fal
- "Moe Loan" Ron-tan (Livedoor Credit)
- Saitama O157 prevention campaign poster
