= LV-ROM =

LaserDisc-based read-only memory format

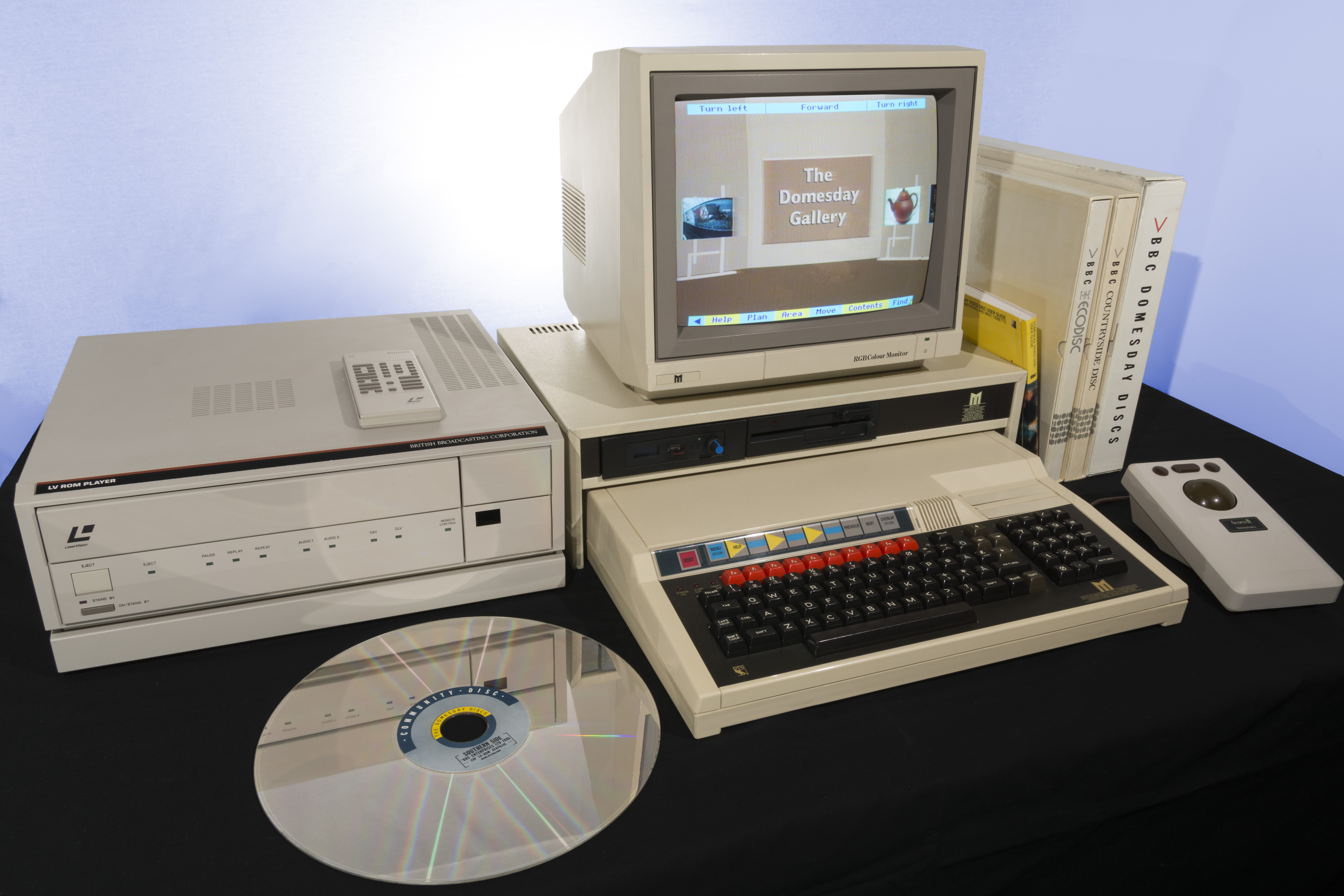
BBC Master computer with a LV-ROM drive and disc

LV-ROM (LaserVision Read-Only Memory) and LD-ROM (LaserDisc Read-Only Memory) are similar but incompatible optical disc formats that combine analog LaserDisc video with digitally encoded computer data. Both were developed to support interactive multimedia by integrating analog video playback with computer-controlled navigation and overlays. While LV-ROM was developed in the 1980s primarily for educational and documentary purposes, LD-ROM was introduced in the 1990s to support video game software for consumer entertainment systems.

== LV-ROM ==
LV-ROM
- Media type: Read-only optical disc
- Encoding: Constant angular velocity; Pulse-width modulation (analog images); Advanced Disc Filing System (data)
- Capacity: 324 MB of data and 54,000 image frames per side
- Read mechanism: Laser diode
- Developed by: Philips · Sony
- Dimensions: 300 mm (11.81 in)
- Usage: Interactive media
- Extended from: LaserDisc
- Extended to: LD-ROM

The LV-ROM format was developed by Philips in the early 1980s. Similar to standard-play LaserDiscs, LV-ROM used constant angular velocity (CAV) playback, with analog video encoded using pulse-width modulation. However, instead of audio, digital data was stored using the Advanced Disc Filing System developed by Acorn Computers. Configured this way, each side of an LV-ROM disc could store up to 324 megabytes of digital data and 54,000 frames of either still images or analog video, equivalent to about 36 minutes at 25 frames per second. Where needed, the digital data could be substituted with analog audio.

The most prominent use of the hybrid video/data LV-ROM format was in the BBC Domesday Project, a major multimedia initiative undertaken between 1984 and 1986 that compiled video interviews, statistical data, images, and maps to create an interactive record of life in the United Kingdom. Discs were accessed using a specially modified BBC Master computer (built by Acorn Computers) connected via a SCSI interface board to a Philips VP415 LaserDisc player, which was developed specifically for the project. This made the Domesday system one of the first non-professional computing platforms to incorporate the emerging SCSI-1 parallel bus standard. Together, these components formed the BBC Master AIV (Acorn Interactive Video) system. A time base corrector inside the player was connected to a reference signal generated by the computer (genlock), allowing the system to overlay computer graphics in real time with the analog video output. Users interacted with the system using a trackball controller.

Following the release of the original Domesday discs, the BBC produced several additional AIV titles for the educational market. Other organizations contributed to the AIV ecosystem as well. Virgin Publishing released North Polar Expedition, which combined video on a LaserDisc with software on a floppy disk. Apple also developed its own LaserDisc-based educational project, the Apple Visual Almanac, which was released in 1989.

== LD-ROM ==
LD-ROM
- Media type: Read-only optical disc
- Encoding: Constant linear velocity
- Capacity: 540 MB and 60 minutes of analog video/audio per side (300 mm disc)
- Read mechanism: Laser diode
- Developed by: Pioneer
- Dimensions: 300 mm (12 in) or 200 mm (8 in)
- Usage: Video games
- Extended from: LV-ROM

The LD-ROM format was developed by Pioneer and introduced in 1993 for use with the LaserActive, a hybrid LaserDisc player, video game console, and CD player. Unlike LV-ROM, which used constant angular velocity for frame-accurate video playback, LD-ROM employed constant linear velocity, like had been done with LaserDisc extended play. LD-ROM discs offered storage capacity reaching up to 540 MB of digital data per side on a typical 300-millimeter (12 in) disc, the same as an early CD-ROM, in addition to 60 minutes of analog video and audio storage, which could be used for cutscenes in full-motion video. A smaller 200 mm (8 in) disc was also available, offering a reduced capacity. The format used a different file system from LV-ROM, and analog video/audio quality was affected by the CLV encoding approach.

The LaserActive system supported video games on the LD-ROM disc, if the system was equipped with the optional expansion modules (PACs) that enabled compatibility with Sega Genesis and TurboGrafx-16 game media.

Variants of LD-ROM include:

- MEGA LD – Used for software compatible with the Mega-CD/Sega CD platform.
- LD-ROM² – Used for software compatible with the PC Engine CD-ROM² platform.
- LD-G – Discs designed for karaoke content, similar to CD+G.

== See also ==
- BBC Domesday Project
- Edutainment
- Optical disc drive
- Pioneer LaserActive
