= High Seas Havoc =

1994 video game

- North American cover art
- Developer: Data East
- Publishers: NA/JP: Data East; PAL: Codemasters
- Designer: Akira Ohtani
- Programmers: Yasuhiro Matsuda; Hiroyasu Fujimaru
- Artists: Mutsunori Sato; Megumi Shinya; Yoichi Kodama
- Composers: Emi Shimizu; Masaaki Iwasaki
- Platforms: Mega Drive/Genesis; Arcade
- Release: NA: January 1994; JP: April 22, 1994; PAL: September 16, 1994
- Genre: Platform
- Mode: Single-player

High Seas Havoc, known in Japan as Captain Lang (キャプテン ラング, Kyaputen Rangu) and in Europe as simply Havoc, is a 1994 platform video game developed and published by Data East for the Sega Mega Drive/Genesis. It was also released in the arcades running on a Sega Mega Drive/Genesis-based arcade cabinet.

== Plot ==
The story is about an anthropomorphic pirate seal named Havoc (Lang in the Japanese version), his young sidekick Tide (Land in the Japanese version), a girl named Bridget, and an evil walrus pirate named Bernardo. Bernardo is looking for Emeralda, a gem with powers that can cause whole armies to be toppled. A map shows where Emeralda is located, and Bernardo is looking for the map. Havoc and Tide discover Bridget unconscious at a beach. When she wakes up in a dwelling, she instructs Havoc to keep her and the map safe. Havoc hides the map in a cliff. After Bernardo's henchmen kidnaps Bridget and Tide, Havoc sets off to rescue them.

== Gameplay ==
Each level apart from the first two and last one have two acts. The Cape Sealph level was removed from the European version.

== Reception ==
Reception

Review scores
Publication	Score
Famitsu	26/40
GamePro	4/5
Mean Machines	64/100

High Seas Havoc received generally positive reviews.

Tony Ponce for Destructoid called the game a rip-off of Sonic the Hedgehog.
