= Nail 'n' Scale =

1990 video game

- North American cover art
- Developer: Bit2
- Publishers: WW: Data East; JP: I'Max
- Platform: Game Boy
- Release: JP: December 13, 1990; NA: April 1992; EU: 1992
- Genre: Puzzle
- Modes: Single-player, multiplayer

Nail 'n' Scale, known as Dragon Tail (ドラゴンテール) in Japan, is a puzzle video game for the Game Boy. A combination of the video game Jump'n Run and various puzzle games, it has a fast-paced side-scrolling gameplay.

== Gameplay ==
Spike using a vertical nail shot

In Nail 'n' Scale, the player controls Spike, a skilled climber. The player works the way through levels of heightening difficulty. In each level, the player uses climbing spikes to navigate through the level to the door at the end of each level. The climbing spikes are also used to break bricks that block the path. There are 51 levels in all, with a boss on every tenth level.

Each boss has his own unique weakness that must be exposed by the player before he can be defeated. While the first boss is not very intimidating, each subsequent one becomes more frightening. Terrifying monsters can be defeated by firing the nail in either a horizontal or a vertical direction. Players can be killed by their own exploding spikes, acquired throughout levels after the first boss. There are several exits on some levels, but only one functions. Only the "true" exit permits access to the next level.

The final boss of the video game is an evil dragon named Lore, who lives in his dragon's lair. Players can continue from where they left off after a "game over", providing that they never turn off their Game Boy.

=== Special items ===
Magical door: Completes the level regardless of the player's location.

White spike: A spike that will not break the brick when jumped on.

Exploding spike: A spike that explodes after a short period of time, destroying the brick it is fired into, provided that the block could be broken normally.

== Reception ==
AllGame rated the game 3 stars out of 5. The gaming magazine Power Play gave it a 61% rating in its March 1991 issue.
