= Road Blaster =

1985 video game

- Japanese arcade flyer
- Developer: Data East: Victor Musical Industries (MSX, X1) Telenet Japan, Wolf Team (Mega-CD) Ecseco Development (Saturn/PS1) Revolutionary Concepts (iOS)
- Publisher: Data East: Wolf Team, Renovation, Sega (Mega-CD) Ecseco Development (Saturn/PS1)
- Directors: Yoshihisa Kishimoto; Kazuyasu Yokō (Sega CD)
- Producers: Joe Asanuma, Masaaki Uno (Sega CD)
- Programmers: Shintaro Kumagai; Takatoshi Kato; Junichi Nabe; Hironobu Mohre & Masa Yoshihara (sound); Shinji Hirachi & Chikaaki Tokuhiro (Sega CD)
- Artists: Hideki Takayama; Yoshinobu Inano; Nobuo Kanuma, Kiyoka Tajima, Masayuki Matsushima, Tadashi Hamada (Sega CD)
- Composers: Michael K. Nakamura; Motoi Sakuraba (Sega CD)
- Platform: Arcade: MSX, Sharp X1, Video Challenger, Sega CD, LaserActive, Saturn, PlayStation, 3DO, VHS, iOS, X68000, Windows, Amiga, CD32
- Release: Data East: Arcade; WW: August 1, 1985 MSX; JP: 1986 Sega CD; JP: December 18, 1992; NA: March 1993; EU: April 1993 LaserActive; JP: January 25, 1995; NA: 1995 Saturn. PlayStation; JP: October 20, 1995 X68000, Windows; JP: May 4, 2009 iOS January 15, 2011
- Genres: Interactive movie, vehicular combat
- Modes: Single-player, multiplayer

Road Blaster (ロードブラスター) is an interactive film game developed by Data East, featuring animation by Toei Animation, originally released in Japan as a LaserDisc-based arcade video game in 1985. The player assumes the role of a vigilante who pursues a biker gang responsible for his wife's death in a modified sports car. The game was ported home formats such as the MSX and Sharp X1 (VHD format), Sega CD (under the title of Road Blaster FX), LaserActive (in Mega-LD format), PlayStation and Saturn (in a compilation with Thunder Storm). The Sega CD and Mega-LD versions were released outside of Japan under titles of Road Avenger and Road Prosecutor.

== Gameplay ==
As with other LaserDisc-based arcade games from the same time, the gameplay consists of on-screen instructions overlaid over pre-recorded full motion video animated footage of high-speed chases and vehicular combat. Played from a first-person perspective, the player controls the crosshair to steer their car toward the correct directions according to the green arrows flashing and beeping beside it, while controlling the gas pedal, brake and booster whenever they light up.

The game has nine stages. Upon successfully completing a level, the player is graded on the reaction time. Different difficulty levels can be selected. In Normal Mode, pop-up icons and audio tones signal when to turn left or right, brake, hit turbo, or hit other cars. In Hard Mode, there are no on-screen icons to guide the player.

== Plot ==
Road Blaster is inspired by revenge thriller films such as Mad Max. In the late 1990s United States, the player assumes the role of a vigilante who drives a customized sports car in order to get revenge on a biker gang responsible for his wife's death on their honeymoon. After recovering from his own injuries, he upgrades his car and goes on a rampage through nine areas. His goal is to seek out the gang's female boss and complete his vengeance.

== Development ==
Road Blaster uses animation provided by the anime studio Toei Animation. It was animated under the guidance of Yoshinobu Inano, who also directed or key-animated such films such as Gundam: Char's Counter Attack, Macross: Do You Remember Love?, and The Transformers: The Movie. It was animated using 15,000 hand-painted cels to produce over 30 minutes of animation. Game director Yoshihisa Kishimoto, who previously worked on Cobra Command, later directed the arcade version of Double Dragon, where the car from Road Blaster can be seen inside the Lee brothers' garage at the start of the game.

The chopper from Cobra Command/Thunder Storm can also be seen at the beginning of Road Blaster.

== Releases ==
Road Blaster was originally released in 1985 as a LaserDisc-based arcade game. Various ports were released throughout history, including versions for the MSX, X1 (both in VHD format), Mega-CD/Sega CD, LaserActive (in Mega LD format), Saturn, PlayStation, and 3DO (prototyped as Turbo Blaster). However, only the Sega CD and Mega LD versions were released outside Japan, under the titles Road Avenger and Road Prosecutor, respectively. In France, Road Avenger was bundled with the Mega-CD II, a promotion that was later credited with contributing to the game's widespread popularity in the country. The titles were possibly changed to avoid confusion with the similarly titled arcade game RoadBlasters by Atari Games, which was ported to the Mega Drive around the same time. Road Blaster was also released for the X68000 and for Windows in 2011, exclusively in Japan. A unofficial Super NES port of the game titled Super Road Blaster was released in 2012, which uses the MSU-1 chip support. Cobra Command and Road Blaster were ported to iOS by Revolutionary Concepts in 2010 and 2011, respectively. In 2018, a port for the Amiga (OCS and AGA) and the CD32 was also released unofficially.

Other variations included one-shot reproductions for VHS cassette players such as Takara's Video Challenger which was a limited interactive port of the Road Blaster arcade game. The Sega Saturn and PlayStation ports were compilations of Road Blaster and another LaserDisc arcade game developed by the same team titled Thunder Storm (known outside Japan as Cobra Command).

== Reception ==
Reception

Aggregate scores
Aggregator	Score
GameRankings	Sega CD: 90%
Metacritic	iOS: 78%

Review scores
Publication	Score
Dragon	Sega CD: 4/5
Famitsu	Mega CD: 32 / 40; Saturn: 25 / 40; PS1: 23 / 40
GameFan	Sega CD: 383 / 400
GamePro	Sega CD: 5 / 5
IGN	iOS: 8 / 10
Electronic Games	Sega CD: 86%
Pocket Gamer	iOS: 7 / 10

Award
Publication	Award
Famitsu	Gold Award

In Japan, Game Machine listed Road Blaster on their January 15, 1986 issue as being the fourteenth most-successful upright/cockpit arcade unit of the month.

Dragon reviewers gave the Sega CD version of the game 4 out of 5 stars in 1993. GameFan noted it has greater interaction compared to Time Gal and Thunderstorm, and praised the "non-stop control of the vehicle," graphics, smooth animation, and "andrenaline rush" experience. GamePro praised the highly detailed animation and stereo CD sound, and called it a "masterpiece" that is "like participating in an intense, action-packed, animated movie."

On release, Famicom Tsūshin scored the Sega Saturn version a 25 out of 40, and the PlayStation version a 23 out of 40. Famitsu would later give the Mega CD version a score of 32 out of 40, while MEGA rated it at 86%. The iOS port was released to generally favourable reviews, including the scores of 8 out of 10 from IGN and 7 out of 10 from Pocket Gamer.

== Legacy ==
A novelization of the game was announced in 2009. The project was officially authorized by G-Mode of Japan (the rights holder to most of Data East's catalog) to be written by Mary Margaret Park.

== See also ==
- List of LaserDisc games
