= Strahl (video game) =

1993 video game

Strahl Triad Stone
- Developer: Data East
- Publishers: Pioneer Productions (Triad Stone); Panasonic (Strahl)
- Platforms: Pioneer LaserActive (Triad Stone); 3DO (Strahl); Saturn (Strahl)
- Release: JP: December 30, 1993 (Sega Mega-LD); JP: December 2, 1994; NA: 1995
- Genre: Action Interactive Movie

Strahl (シュトラール ～秘められし七つの光) is an interactive movie game originally developed by Data East featuring animation by Toei Animation. It was originally intended to be released as a LaserDisc-based arcade game under the title of Chantze's Stone (チャンツェストーン) in 1985, but was shelved. The game would resurface a decade later for the LaserActive's Mega-LD module under the title of Triad Stone (トライアッドストーン) and on the 3DO Interactive Multiplayer and Sega Saturn under its final title.

== Gameplay ==
The gameplay primarily consists of watching an anime movie and pushing buttons as prompted on the screen. Failure to correctly follow a prompt results in a lost life. The player has three lives and two continues, but losing a life sends the player back to the beginning of the level. There are eight levels in all; the player may select which of the first three levels to play first. Completing any of these levels unlocks the next four, but all of the first seven levels must be completed to unlock the final level.

== Plot ==
The player assumes the role of Alex Hawkfield, an ordinary young man living in a small town who finds an old man dying in the street. He takes the old man (actually God in disguise) into his home and takes care of him. As he has proven his kindness, the old man tells him he has the potential to make the world better and become king, and asks him if he would like to try his potential. Alex does not know how to answer, but the old man senses his feelings and, seeing he is ready, sends him on a trial to recover the seven fragments of a mystic stone. Each time Alex recovers a stone fragment leads to the rebirth and invention of various things in his world.

== Version differences ==
The LaserActive and Saturn versions allow the player to choose from three different difficulties; the 3DO version omits this feature. The LaserActive version also includes a scoring system, a language option (English or Japanese), and beeping noises and occasional voice commands (e.g. "Get them off!", "Power up!") accompanying the button prompts, all of which were dropped from later versions of the game. The later versions also add some action sequences, such as a scene in which the hero must fight off a horde of tiny humanoids.

All three versions feature completely different visuals for both the introductory cutscene and stage select.

== Reception ==
The four reviewers of Electronic Gaming Monthly scored the 3DO version a 6.125 out of 10. They praised the animation and imagination of the full motion video but concurred that the stages are much too easy and that the gameplay does nothing to differentiate itself from previous games in the Dragon's Lair genre. One of them summarized that "Strahl is intended for two specific types of people: those who enjoy FMV games and those who like watching Japanimation." GamePro gave it a negative review, criticizing the unoriginal gameplay and visuals and the fact that the different endings are acquired simply by playing the stages in different orders. They concluded that "this anime-inspired CD is too easy and far less humorous than Dragon's Lair, and it won't keep you interested long."

Next Generation reviewed the 3DO version of the game, rating it one star out of five, and stated that "Strahl is a title that's placed squarely in the Dragon's Lair tradition, this time using anime-styled characters and action. We wish there was a better way to say this, but basically, it sucks."
