= Dashin' Desperadoes =

1993 video game

- Box art
- Developer: Data East
- Publisher: Data East
- Designer: Eisuke Tsuzawa
- Composers: Masaaki Iwasaki; Hiroyasu Fujimaru; Manabu Yokoi
- Platform: Sega Genesis
- Release: NA: September 1993
- Genre: Platform
- Modes: Single-player, multiplayer

Dashin' Desperadoes is a platform game by Data East for the Sega Genesis released in 1993. In the game players control one of two cowboys, Will or Rick, who run and negotiate various obstacles to reach the maiden Jenny.

It is the first Genesis game from Data East since Captain America and The Avengers released the year before. Playing the game on Japanese hardware yields an alternate title, Rumble Kids, despite being never released in Japan. In 1993, Data East also released a Neo-Geo exclusive game titled Spinmaster featuring main characters similar to the ones in Dashin' Desperadoes.

== Gameplay ==
In the 1-player game, the cowboy hat wearing hero, Will, races to reach Jenny, the blond-haired maiden who waits at the end of each level. The hero is racing against his blond-haired nemesis, Rick, who also is trying to reach the girl. Through obstacles, hazards, and various creatures, Will and Rick race each other through six different worlds (three levels each) of beaches, jungles, and ancient ruins to reach Jenny. In the finale of each world, Jenny is kidnapped by Rick, who attempts to take her away. The player, as the hero Will, must use all of the weapons in his arsenal to damage Rick's vehicle as it attempts to escape.

In the 2-player game, the second player takes over as Rick, and they both race after Jenny in split screen mode. Whoever arrives first receives a kiss from her. Using bombs, barbells, electricity, and ice, each player must do whatever it takes to reach Jenny first.

== Reviews ==
Reception

Review scores
Publication	Score
Electronic Gaming Monthly	6.5/10
GamePro	4.5/5
