= Minnesota Fats: Pool Legend =

1995 video game

- Developer: Data East
- Publisher: Data East
- Producers: Etsuko Adelman; Akira Otani
- Designer: Akira Otani
- Programmers: Hiroyasu Fujimaru; Yasuhiro Matsuda; Hisatada Ōta
- Writers: Akira Otani; David Hoffman
- Composers: Masaaki Iwasaki; Taihei Sato; Seiji Momoi; Shogo Sakai
- Series: Side Pocket
- Platforms: Sega Genesis; Sega Saturn
- Release: Sega Genesis: NA: May 1995; Sega Saturn: NA: 1995; JP: March 31, 1995
- Genre: Cue sports
- Modes: Single-player, multiplayer

Minnesota Fats: Pool Legend is a 1995 pool (pocket billiards) video game for the Sega Genesis and Sega Saturn. It was also released in Japan for the Saturn under the alternative title Side Pocket 2: Legend of Hustler (Japanese: サイドポケット2 伝説のハスラー, Hepburn: Saido Poketto 2 Densetsu no Hasurā). The game features fictional pool hustler Minnesota Fats. It was released as a sequel to Data East's earlier success Side Pocket.

== Gameplay ==
The objective is to travel through different cities and defeat computer-controlled hustlers. The player can also take on another human player in order to prove his worthiness at the pool table.

The Saturn version of the game largely plays the same as the Genesis version, but includes a training mode, a short documentary on Minnesota Fats, and a completely different plot in the story mode. In the Genesis version, the player takes the role of an unnamed rookie pool player seeking to challenge Minnesota Fats, and cutscenes are computer-animation. In the Saturn version, the player takes the role of Minnesota Fats himself, in his quest to challenge fictional pool hustlers from around the United States; live-action, full-motion videos (FMVs) are used for the cutscenes.

In the story mode of both games, the player plays either eight-ball or nine-ball, whereas in other modes, the player can also choose multiple other game types, including straight pool, rotation and one-pocket.

== Development ==
As was typical of live action FMV in video games, the cutscenes in the Saturn version were shot on a minimal budget. Some of the opponents were portrayed by staff from Data East's marketing department.

== Reception ==
GamePro gave the Genesis version a generally negative review. While they praised the "authentic" sound effects and the story mode, they commented that the overhead view makes the balls look small and flat, all the available music tracks are elevator music, and the controls are imprecise. Next Generation, in contrast, said Minnesota Fats improved upon the already excellent original Side Pocket by adding new modes and the ability to play eight-ball, "the staple of any pool game that was mysteriously absent in the original." They added that the cue-ball shaped cursor is more accurate, the physics are more realistic, and the opponent AI, while prone to making miraculous shots and missing easy ones, provides an overall decent challenge. They deemed it "easily the best pool game for a home system – though it still can't beat a smokey bar", and gave it 3 out of 5 stars. Ação Games gave it 4 out of 5 circles.

On release, Famicom Tsūshin scored the Sega Saturn version of the game at 28 out of 40. GamePro panned the game, calling it "a slow, plodding CD with clumsy controls". They particularly criticized that shots which would be easy to make in real life often don't come off in the game, and that the graphics are restricted to a single view with no close-ups or switchable camera points. The review made some odd errors: it refers to the original Side Pocket as a Sega CD game, and states that the story mode climaxes in a duel with Minnesota Fats (true of the Genesis version, but not the Saturn version). Next Generation also criticized this version in a brief review published over a year after the game, summarizing it as "some poorly written and acted FMV clips of Minnesota Fats around what is nothing more than a top-down, 16-bit pool game". The reviewer scored it 1 out of 5 stars.

== Legacy ==
The game has a sequel called Side Pocket 3.
