= The Who's Tommy Pinball Wizard =

1994 pinball machine

The Who's Tommy Pinball Machine
- A photograph of the pinball machine via WakefieldPinball
- Manufacturer: Data East
- Release date: January 1994
- System: DataEast/Sega Version 3
- Design: Joe Kaminkow, Ed Cebula, Lonnie D. Ropp, Lyman F. Sheats Jr.
- Music: Brian Schmidt
- Sound: Brian Schmidt
- Production run: 4,700

The Who's Tommy Pinball Wizard is a pinball machine based on the rock musical The Who's Tommy, based upon the band's 1969 rock opera album of the same name, which was also adapted into a 1975 motion picture. The machine features twenty-one songs from the musical sung by original Broadway cast members. The game was designed by Joe Kaminkow, Ed Cebula, Lonnie D. Ropp, and Lyman F. Sheats Jr. The backbox of the machine has a dot matrix display with animations by Kurt Andersen and Markus Rothkranz. 4,700 machines were manufactured by Data East in January 1994. There is a large 10" pinball on top of the backbox.

== Gameplay ==
There are three skill shot bonuses possible on the launch of each new ball. Two of which award increasing point values, and the third initiates a multiball if lit. The main game modes of the table are accessed by lighting the entire Union Jack on the playfield’s center. There are 12 mini-games in this mode based on various scenes and scores from the musical. Completing these 12 modes unlocks the "Pinball Wizard" multiball of six balls By lighting the letters to spell T-O-M-M-Y then hitting one of two scoops. Depending on which scoop activates the multiball, the player is given either 3 or 4 balls. This mode has multiple subsequent stages, each awarding greater point values as jackpots.

== Storyline ==
The separate game modes follow the plot of the musical. The musical consists of two acts and a total of twenty scenes, with the highlights of those scenes replicated with dot matrix animations on the backglass of the machine during the twelve Union Jack modes as well as Tommy Mode.

playfield

== Features ==
The music for the machine consists of stage adaptations from the original rock opera Tommy, composed by Pete Townshend of The Who. There are 21 songs total programmed to play throughout gameplay and for various stages and modes. Songs include "Overture", "Captain Walker", "It's a Boy", "Sparks", "Christmas", "See Me Feel Me", "Smash the Mirror", "Fiddle About", "Cousin Kevin", "Sensation", "The Acid Queen", "Pinball Wizard", "Listening To You" and "Sally Simpson". "The Acid Queen" is instrumental only, without the vocals. To launch each ball, the player can use either an automatic launch by pressing a flipper button while a ball is in the alley, or manually via the spring plunger assembly. The machine includes an automated silver disc that rotates to cover the flipper portion of the machine to emulate playing pinball as the title character, who is blind. This mode occurs during each multiball sequence, or for the entire duration of the game by player selection of the Tommy game mode. The owner/operator may program a feature that allows the player to exchange credits for extra ball(s) to continue the game where it left off.

The game includes a video mode where the player controls a plane and attempts to shoot a series of targets.

== Other versions ==
Data East was one of few regular pinball company that manufactured custom pinball games. A single game was made for the film Richie Rich, based on the Tommy pinball machine. Another machine based on Tommy, called Kabuki, was produced for Mr. Nakamura, the head of Namco who was fighting cancer at the time.

Ten pre-production prototypes were also made for promotional use in conjunction with the off-Broadway productions. These prototypes had six pop bumpers while the production version only has three. The game made its debut at the Hard Rock Cafe in Dallas in October 1993 where one of these games fell off the truck and was destroyed. Another was used in the 1993 Macy's Thanksgiving Day Parade, this special machine was rigged for "autoplay" and had no backbox, electronics were cabinet-mounted. Reportedly, these prototypes may have had EM chime units.

== Reception ==
In a review for The Flipside Data East were congratulated for a fantastic game suitable for novices and for experienced players.
