= Side Pocket =

1986 video game

- Arcade flyer
- Developers: Data East: Iguana Entertainment (Super NES); ISCO/Opera House (Game Gear)
- Publishers: Data East; Namco (Famicom): EU: Nintendo (Game Boy); EU: Sega (Mega Drive)
- Composer: List: K. Suzuki (NES version) Yusuke Takahama (Game Boy version) Rick Fox (Super NES version) Emi Shimizu (Genesis version)
- Platforms: Arcade, Sega Genesis, NES, Super NES, Game Boy, Game Gear, WonderSwan
- Release: June 1986: Arcade; JP: June 1986; NA: 1986 NES/Famicom; JP: October 30, 1987; NA: November 1987; EU: May 27, 1992 Game Boy (Side Pocket VS); JP: September 21, 1990; NA: November 1990; EU: 1990 Genesis; NA: August 1992; JP: December 11, 1992; EU: 1992 Super NES; NA: December 1993; JP: March 18, 1994; EU: 1994 Game Gear; NA: 1994 WonderSwan; JP: November 25, 1999 (Side Pocket for WonderSwan)
- Genre: Sports (cue sports)
- Modes: Single-player, multiplayer

Side Pocket (Note: Japanese: サイドポケット, Hepburn: Saido Poketto) is a 1986 billiards video game developed and published by Data East for arcades. It was ported to the Nintendo Entertainment System and Game Boy, while an enhanced remake was later released on the Sega Genesis, Super Nintendo Entertainment System, and Game Gear. The game spawned two sequels, as well as arcade spin-off series titled Pocket Gal.

G-Mode owns the intellectual property rights to the Side Pocket series, and licenses these games globally.

== Gameplay ==
Genesis gameplay showing a lit-up pocket

The primary play mode, called "Pocket Game", is a straight pool-like game set within a limited number of lives; the player must achieve a predetermined score to advance through four or five levels, each with increasing number of balls. The player earns points by pocketing balls, pocketing balls on consecutive shots, and pocketing balls in numerical order. On occasion, a flashing star appear in a pocket, and if the player pockets a ball into that pocket in the same shot, a bonus will be awarded in the form of points, extra lives or a bonus round. One life is lost if the player scratches or fails to pocket a ball in two consecutive turns.

In the two-player mode, the player can choose between Pocket Game or 9-Ball Game. In two-player Pocket Game, the game plays similarly, except the two players take turns and there are no lives; if one player misses or scratches, control of the cue ball simply changes to the other player. In 9-Ball Game, each player has three lives and one life is lost if a player incurs a foul. However, the lives will be restored if the player makes a legal shot on the next turn.

In the Game Boy and Game Gear version, there is also an additional practice mode, which is essentially a single-player version of 9-Ball Game.

A variety of trick shot challenges are also available to the player(s), to earn additional points or extra life, requiring the player pot all balls into select pockets using a single shot. The player may put various spins on the ball, such as left and right english, and perform massés and jump shots.

North American SNES cover art

The Genesis, Super NES and Game Gear versions features a photo-realistic representation of the player characters. The characters are a homage to the 1986 billiards-themed film The Color of Money, with the characters bearing resemblance to Vincent Lauria (played by Tom Cruise) and Fast Eddie (played by Paul Newman), the two main characters from the film.

== Ports and sequels ==
Side Pocket was ported to the Nintendo Entertainment System and Game Boy. The NES version plays almost identical to the arcade version, but the Pocket Game mode features 4 levels and the player starts with 5 lives, as opposed to 2. The NES version also introduce four different rack configuration that become standard in later versions, whereas the arcade version only feature six-ball and nine-ball racks.

The Game Boy version of Side Pocket is a slight modification from the NES version, featuring a smaller playing field (to compensate with Game Boy's screen), new set of soundtrack and a different screen layout. Like in NES version, the Pocket Game mode features 4 levels and the player starts with 5 lives. One unique addition to the Game Boy version is the ability to play single-player nine-ball mode, while in other versions this mode is limited only to two players.

Enhanced remakes of the game were later released for the Sega Genesis, Super Nintendo Entertainment System, and Game Gear. This version features updated contents compared to the original NES and Game Boy versions, including revamped graphics, new soundtrack, and photo-realistic background sceneries during gameplay. The main game modes remain identical to the original, with several alteration on the Pocket Game mode. This mode now features five levels represented as "cities" (Los Angeles, San Francisco, Las Vegas, New York City, and Atlantic City) and the player starts with eight lives. In addition, a new "trick shot" mode is featured, in which the player can try one of the 19 trick shot levels, each with increasing difficulty.

The Game Gear port is a stripped-down version of the Genesis version, which plays more akin to the original rendition, more specifically the NES version. However, most elements from the Genesis/Super NES version are retained, such as the background images (scaled down to 8-bit), some of the soundtracks, and the trick shot levels.

=== Sequels ===
Minnesota Fats: Pool Legend expands greatly upon the original game by adding various pool games (including eight-ball, straight pool, and one-pocket) and the ability to play against computer-controlled opponents.

Side Pocket 3 uses a first-person view, and adds new characters to the game.

== Pocket Gal ==
Pocket Gal arcade video game

Pocket Gal is the arcade adaptation of the NES version of Side Pocket released exclusively for Japan in 1987. Gameplay remains similar to the NES game, although the lesser number of lives makes the game more challenging. It also has different music and sound effects, alongside hidden nudity as rewards for completing certain levels. An English version was also released under the name Pocket Gal 2. There is also another version of the game called Super Pool III which removes the nudity. This version was published by I-Vics in North America.

Pocket Gal Deluxe arcade video game

In 1992, a sequel called Pocket Gal Deluxe was released in Japan and Europe. While the gameplay remains the same, Pocket Gal Deluxe features revamped graphics, more levels and includes a MIDI-based jazz music. Furthermore, Pocket Gal Deluxe also serve as the basis for the Genesis, Super Nintendo Entertainment System, and Game Gear versions of Side Pocket.

== Reception ==
In Japan, Game Machine listed Side Pocket on their August 1, 1986 issue as being the eighth most-successful table arcade unit of the month. It went on to be the eighth highest-grossing table arcade game of 1987 in Japan.

In reviewing the NES version, Computer Gaming World declared it "far and away the best billiards simulation ever published for any system". The features that went beyond realistic pool were especially praised as enhancing the game's play.

Reviewing the Super NES version, GamePro praised the variety of modes, the audio and graphical improvements over the NES version, and the realistic details. They recommended the game "for pool enthusiasts and casual video game pool players alike. There are plenty of great options and genuine pool strategies to keep serious players interested, and yet it's simple enough to play without the manual." They gave the Game Gear version a more mixed review, commenting that the representation of the player's stick as a stream of balls is needlessly cumbersome, and that the graphics and sound are poor. However, they summarized, "Determining the precise angle and power for a shot can be harder than taking a geometry test, but it's definitely more fun." Electronic Gaming Monthly also complained of poor sounds but were more impressed with the graphics, describing them as exceptional for a portable system. They praised the game for its trick shots and generally strategic gameplay and gave it a 6.25 out of 10.

Entertainment Weekly gave the game a B− and wrote: "Insipid electronic lounge sounds are an integral component of Side Pocket (for Genesis), which presents American pool halls as a series of squeaky-clean (no beer stains on the felt here), nonconfrontational venues where your sole objective is to play pool—and not, say, impress your date with how many shots of tequila you can down in five minutes. Embodying this utilitarian approach is the game's hyper-realistic, overhead-angle table display—not as realistic, unfortunately, is its follow-the-dotted-line aiming system, which allows you to hit the cue ball in only about half a dozen places. An extensive trick-shot menu—apparently meant to compensate for this glaring limitation—is intriguing, but completely superfluous."

Italian magazine Consolmania, however, gave the Genesis version 80.

In 1995, Total! ranked the game 70th on their Top 100 SNES Games, writing: "A bit flawed and there are no UK pool rules but in two-player mode this is a real giggle." In 1996, Super Play listed Side Pocket 90th in its Top 100 SNES Games of All Time.
