= Tumblepop =

1991 video game

- Japanese arcade flyer
- Developer: Data East
- Publishers: Arcade: JP: Data East; NA: Leprechaun Inc.; EU: Mitchell Corporation; Game Boy; Data East
- Designer: Makoto Kikuchi
- Programmers: Hidemi Hamada; Kei Ichikawa; Minoru Sano
- Artists: Atsushi Takahashi; Chie Kitahara; Hiroshi Tada
- Composers: Tatsuya Kiuchi; Tomoyoshi Sato; Mihoko Ando
- Platforms: Arcade, Game Boy
- Release: Arcade: JP: November 1991; NA: 1991; EU: 1991; Game Boy: JP: November 20, 1992; NA: March 1993
- Genre: Platform
- Modes: Single-player, multiplayer

Tumblepop (Note: Japanese: タンブルポップ, Hepburn: Tanburupoppu) is a 1991 platform video game developed and published by Data East for arcades. It was released in North America by Leprechaun Inc. and in Europe by Mitchell Corporation. Starring two ghosthunters, players are tasked with travelling across different countries, capturing enemies and throwing them as bouncing ball, jumping on and off platforms to navigate level obstacles while dodging and defeating monsters in order to save the world.

Designed by Makoto Kikuchi, Tumblepop was developed by most of the same team that worked on several projects at Data East. The game was later ported to the Game Boy with several changes or additions from the original version. The game was met with mostly positive reception from critics and players alike, gaining a cult following since its initial release. However, other versions were met with a more mixed response from reviewers.

== Gameplay ==
Arcade version screenshot.

Tumblepop is a platform game reminiscent of Bubble Bobble, Pang, and Snow Bros.. Players assume the role of ghosthunters through ten levels consisting of ten stages set in different parts of the world (Moscow, Egypt, Paris, New York City, Rio de Janeiro, Antarctica, Australia, Japan, Space and Moon), each with a boss at the every tenth stage that must be fought before progressing any further, in an effort to defeat monsters, ghosts, aliens and other oddball characters. Each player can suck enemies into a vacuum cleaner-like devices, but enemies can escape from the player's vacuum and kill their character if they are kept for too long. Once an enemy has been captured into the vacuum, players can spit them back as rolling balls, which will rebound off of walls until eventually shattering against a wall.

Any enemies the tumbling ball rolls into are eliminated and reveal hidden bonus items that are crucial for reaching high scores, such as collectable letters of the alphabet found in randomly appearing bubbles to gradually spell the word "TUMBLEPOP", the progress of which is permanently displayed at the bottom of the screen; the word goes back to default after completion. When completed, players are transported to a bonus level which gives them the opportunity to obtain higher scores and an extra life, although this level is strictly timed. If the player takes too much time to complete a level, an invincible vampire-like beast will try to kill the players, even during a boss encounter.

When players bowl an enemy over, it may drop other items like gems, money or power-ups. Players can also stun enemies with the beam emitted from the vacuum-cleaner. The game hosts cameos of characters from other Data East games such as Karnov, Atomic Runner Chelnov, and Joe & Mac. If a single player is downed, their character is immediately respawned at the location they start at on every stage. Getting hit by enemy fire will result in losing a life, as well as a penalty of decreasing the characters' firepower and speed to his original state and once all lives are lost, the game is over unless the players insert more credits to continue playing.

== Development and release ==
Tumblepop was developed by most of the same team that worked on several projects at Data East, with Makoto Kikuchi serving as its designer. Hidemi Hamada, Kei Ichikawa and Minoru Sano acted as programmers, while several artists like Atsushi Takahashi, Chie Kitahara, Hiroshi Tada and others were responsible for the pixel art. The soundtrack was handled by Gamadelic members Mihoko Ando, Tatsuya Kiuchi and Tomoyoshi Sato.

Tumblepop was first released in November 1991 in Japan by Data East, and later by Leprechaun Inc. in North America and Mitchell Corporation in Europe. A Game Boy version by Data East was first released in Japan on 20 November 1992, and in North America in March 1993. The Game Boy version incorporates a world map that does not resemble Earth; levels are contained in different cities on that map that the player can walk between. If a city proves too difficult, it is also possible to drop out of it and come back later via a password system. Enemies in a given city approximately correspond to those in an area in the arcade version, though there is not necessarily any link between the real world's cities and the game's cities. In addition, this version also incorporates a shop in which players can spend their points to buy power-ups. It has since been re-released on both the Nintendo 3DS' Virtual Console by G-Mode and the AntStream service.

=== Tumblepop: Memories ===
A reimagining called Tumblepop: Memories was announced for the Nintendo Switch, due to release in 2026. It includes a remake of the original main game arcade mode, as well as the original arcade and Game Boy versions.

== Reception ==
Reception

Review scores
Publication	Score
GamePro	(Game Boy) 14/20
Nintendo Life	(Virtual Console) 6/10
Game Zone	(Arcade) 2/5
MeriStation	(Arcade) 7.5/10
Nintendo Gamer	(Virtual Console) 45%
Play Time	(Game Boy) 69%
Total!	(Game Boy) 3+
Zero	(Arcade) 2/5

In Japan, Game Machine listed Tumblepop as the eighth most successful table arcade unit of November 1991. In the February 1992 issue of Japanese publication Micom BASIC Magazine, the game was ranked on the number eight spot in popularity. The arcade original has gained a cult following since its release.

Computer and Video Games's Julian Rignall gave high praise to the visuals, sound and "addictive" gameplay. Both Emmanuel Castro and Bruno Sol of Spanish website Vandal gave it a positive retrospective outlook. Likewise, Juan Garcia of IGN Spain also gave it a positive retrospective outlook.
