= Creature Shock =

1994 video game

- North American MS-DOS cover art
- Developers: Argonaut Software; Interactive Studios (Saturn)
- Publishers: Virgin Interactive Entertainment; Data East (PS1/Saturn)
- Producers: Mark Washbrook; Neil Young
- Programmers: Jonathan Wolff; Lewis Gordon; Mark Johnston
- Artists: Adrian King; Marcus Morgan; Marcus Punter
- Composers: Justin Scharvona; Martin Gwynn Jones
- Platforms: 3DO, CD-i, MS-DOS, PlayStation, Saturn
- Release: December 1994: MS-DOS; NA/EU: December 1994 Saturn; JP: 19 January 1996; NA: 1996 3DO; NA: 19 March 1996 PlayStation; JP: 23 August 1996 CD-i; EU: 1997
- Genres: Dungeon crawler, rail shooter
- Mode: Single-player

Creature Shock is a 1994 sci-fi video game developed by Argonaut Software and published by Virgin Interactive Entertainment for MS-DOS and 3DO. The game was later ported to the CD-i, Sega Saturn and PlayStation video game systems.

The game was one of the first extensive CD-ROM titles and used full-motion video for both cutscene and interactive portions. It is over a gigabyte in size over two discs. Gameplay is divided into two portions: an on-rails shoot 'em up portion in which the player pilots a ship through various pre-rendered environments and an adventure-style first-person action portion where players chose between track-based paths at various nodes.

== Plot ==

Top: Shoot 'em up segment.
Bottom: Rail shooter segment.

In 2123, the UNS Amazon is sent as part of an exploration fleet to various planets to determine new viable locations for settlement as the Earth is destroyed by human activity. En route to Saturn, the Amazon is ensnared by a massive alien being resembling a large asteroid. The protagonist, Commander Jason Barr, is sent to investigate the incident.

He encounters heavy resistance on his way to Saturn, and after fighting through multitudes of alien ships, encounters the UNS Amazon almost completely absorbed by the organic asteroid. As he explores it, he comes into contact with what appears to be Captain Sumoki of the Amazon. However, she morphs into a demonic looking alien and attacks. Upon defeat, it reverts to the appearance of the Captain and Barr takes it back to the Moon base.

The being is examined and determined to be an alien clone. Upon interrogation, it reveals an alien listening base located on Tethys. Barr heads to Tethys to find the base and destroy its communication uplink. Upon his arrival he encounters a probe which proceeds to scan his ship before heading back to the base. Barr chases it through the valleys, where he locates the base. He manages to complete his mission and escape the base before it's destroyed. His ship, however, gets caught in the data beam and he is pulled up through it.

Regaining consciousness, he pilots the ship through several pieces of debris and destroys an awaiting alien ship. His ship is badly damaged in the process and crashes into the alien mothership. With no means of escape, he searches the ship and engages the leader in battle, finally defeating him on the bridge. He then accidentally activates the ship terraforming ability, changing its coordinates from Earth to Mars. With this Mars is transformed into a second Earth, providing humanity a new home.

== Ports ==
In March 1994, Argonaut Software was signed as a third-party developer by Atari Corporation to develop games for the Atari Jaguar platform. A port of Creature Shock for the Atari Jaguar CD was announced at Spring ECTS '94 and SCES '94 as one of the first upcoming titles for the add-on and was also planned to be published by Virgin Interactive Entertainment. The port was first showcased at E3 1995 and was slated for an August/Q3 1995 release, but development on the port was cancelled after the poor reception of a video demo showcased at Autumn ECTS '95 and several delays.

=== Version differences ===
The PC and CD-i versions feature mouse support, and the CD-i version also supports the use of the CD-i light gun. All other versions of the game are compatible with standard controllers only.

The PC and 3DO versions include three FMV exploration levels and two rail shooter levels. The CD-i and PlayStation versions and the Japanese release of the Saturn version contain only the three FMV exploration levels.

Two versions were released for the Saturn: the Japanese release, which is similar to the PlayStation version, and the North American release, which is labeled as a "Special Edition". The Special Edition features slightly enhanced visuals and some options which do not appear in other versions of the game, but its main feature is two exclusive rail shooter levels with polygon graphics. These levels appear in the place of the PC version's two rail shooter levels, but bear no resemblance to them. They have a number of glitches; for instance, level 3 sometimes fails to end when the boss is defeated. Presumably due to space limitations, the Special Edition splits the final level into two levels, one on each disc. Sound disappears at set intervals during cutscenes in both Saturn versions.

== Reception ==
Reception

Review scores
Publication	Score
Computer Gaming World	2.5/5 (DOS)
IGN	2/10 (SAT special edition) (Note: The heading indicates the PlayStation version is being reviewed, but the review refers to a "polygon shooter level", something only found in the Saturn "Special Edition" of the game.)
Next Generation	1/5 (DOS, SAT special edition)

While hailed for its elaborate and beautiful artwork, the gameplay was razed. IGN stated in their 2 out of 10 review, "track-based shooters with lots of prerendered cut-shots are the bane of our existence. Woe to the hapless gamer who actually pays his hard earned money for these dogs. I warn you now: avoid Creature Shock like your life depends on it." Next Generation deemed Creature Shock "positive proof that a good game must consist of more than just flashy graphics and loud sound effects." They judged the game's limited level of interactivity to be utterly backwards, pointing out that the gameplay resembles the 1987 game After Burner.

GamePro gave the 3DO version a negative review, saying that despite the variety of gameplay styles, the gameplay feels routine due to the lack of multiple weapons. He also criticized that the cursor moves too slowly to keep up with enemies even when the player's technique is flawless. Reviewing the Saturn "Special Edition", GamePro called it "a poor man's Cyberia", saying that the game has imaginative visuals but grainy full motion video, a cursor that tends to get lost in the graphics, and a general lack of excitement and fun. Next Generation said in a brief review that it "features great rendered graphics but drags with a low grade, point-and-click shooting interface."
