= Spinmaster =

1993 video game

- Developers: Data East; Onan Games (Zeebo)
- Publisher: SNK: G-Mode (Zeebo)
- Designers: Mitsutoshi Sato; Atsushi.Sir
- Programmers: C. Enomoto; Kenichi Minegishi; Osapan; Mya
- Artists: Hiroki Narisawa; Kazumi Enomoto; Sachiko Moizumi; Yuzuru Tsukahara; Kaori
- Composers: Tomoyoshi Sato; Mihoko Ando
- Platforms: Arcade, Neo Geo AES, Zeebo
- Release: Arcade: WW: December 16, 1993; Neo Geo AES: WW: February 18, 1994; Zeebo: MEX: March 30, 2010; BRA: April 15, 2010
- Genre: Platform
- Modes: Single-player, multiplayer
- Arcade system: Neo Geo MVS

Spinmaster (Note: Also known as Miracle Adventure (Japanese: ミラクルアドベンチャー, Hepburn: Mirakuru Adobenchā) in Japan.) is a 1993 platform video game developed and published by Data East for the Neo Geo arcade and home platforms. It is the first game developed by Data East for the Neo Geo. Its character designs are almost identical to the ones in Data East's Sega Genesis game Dashin' Desperadoes; however, the rest of both games are completely different. Also, Spinmaster's gameplay, artwork style, animations of some characters and the styles of its weapons were heavily inspired by another arcade game by Data East titled Joe & Mac, according to the Japanese Miracle Adventure arcade flyer.

After Data East became defunct due to its bankruptcy in 2003, G-Mode bought the intellectual rights to the Neo Geo game, as well as most other Data East games, and licenses them globally.

The game was later re-released on the Virtual Console in Japan on August 3, 2010, the PAL region on November 12, 2010 and in North America on November 22, 2010. Hamster Corporation re-released the game as part of their ACA Neo Geo series for the PlayStation 4, Xbox One, Nintendo Switch and Windows.

== Gameplay ==
Gameplay screenshot.

Players progress across the side-scrolling levels, jumping to avoid obstacles and reach platforms and defeating enemies with a default yo-yo weapon or projectile weapons obtained from treasure chests. They can also crouch or slide tackle to attack enemies or evade incoming attacks. Quickly tapping the attack button rapid-fires weapons, and holding the attack button charges an alternate fire mode that varies depending on the equipped weapon. There are also limited screen-clearing super attacks that also vary depending on the equipped weapon.

There are five worlds of several stages each, which takes place in Madrid, Egypt, China, South America, and finally Ancient Greece. Each world ends with a boss fight that awards a fragment of a treasure map when defeated. After collecting the full map, players choose one of three locations, each of which are a different ending to the game.

== Plot ==
Many years ago, a large treasure was hidden by a mysterious man on an uncharted island. The man of mystery drew the location of the treasure on a map and hid it deep in the forest of the island. Days turned to weeks, weeks turned to years, and years turned to decades. The man who hid the map disappeared, never to be seen again. During this time, the map became dirty and weathered, eventually tearing into five pieces which were scattered about the corners of the world. One of these pieces wafted its way into the possession of the young treasure seeker named Johnny. Living with his girlfriend Mary and his rugged cowboy partner named Tom, Johnny dreamed of the day when he would some day find the ancient treasure on the hidden island of the mysterious man.

Then one day, the greedy, treasure-seeking mad scientist, Dr. De Playne appeared in Johnny's little town. Seizing Johnny's piece of the treasure map and kidnapping Mary, Dr. De Playne set out to find the treasure and buy up all the toys and candy of the world, plunging the children of earth into a bitter darkness of continuous study and well-balanced meals. Johnny and Tom pursued the mad Dr. De Playne with their yo-yos to save Mary and the world.

== Reception ==
Contemporary reception

Aggregate score
| Aggregator | Score |
|---|---|
| GameRankings | (Neo Geo) 60% |

Review scores
| Publication | Score |
|---|---|
| AllGame | (Neo Geo) 3.5/5 |
| Edge | (Neo Geo) 4 / 10 |
| GameFan | (Neo Geo) 122 / 150 |
| Consoles + | (Neo Geo) 85% |
| Games World | (Neo Geo) 84 / 100 |
| Hobby Consolas | (Neo Geo) 90 / 100 |
| Joypad | (Neo Geo) 65% |
| MAN!AC | (Neo Geo) 72% |
| Megablast | (Neo Geo) 85% |
| Mega Fun | (Neo Geo) 76% |
| Play Time | (Neo Geo) 75% |
| Player One | (Neo Geo) 78% |
| Power Unlimited | (Neo Geo) 80 / 100 |
| Superjuegos | (Neo Geo) 85 / 100 |
| Video Games | (Neo Geo) 73% |

In North America, RePlay reported Spinmaster to be the eleventh most popular arcade game at the time. Play Meter also listed the game to be the fifty-third most popular arcade game at the time. The title garnered mostly positive reception from critics and reviewers alike since its initial release.

=== Retrospective reviews ===
Retrospective assessments

Aggregate score
| Aggregator | Score |
|---|---|
| GameRankings | (Switch) 70% |

Review scores
| Publication | Score |
|---|---|
| IGN | (Wii) 6.0 / 10 |
| Nintendo Life | (Wii) 7/10 (Switch) 7/10 |
| Bonus Stage | (Switch) 8 / 10 |

Spinmaster has been met with mostly positive reception from retrospective reviewers in recent years. In 2014, HobbyConsolas identified it as one of the twenty best games for the Neo Geo AES.
