= Defcon 5 (1995 video game) =

1995 action-adventure video game

- North American MS-DOS box art
- Developer: Millennium Interactive
- Publishers: Psygnosis: PlayStation; PAL: Psygnosis; NA: Data East Saturn; PAL: GT Interactive; NA: Data East MS-DOS; EU: GT Interactive; NA: Vic Tokai (Note: Released under the Nova Spring brand name) 3DO GoldStar LG Electronics
- Platforms: PlayStation, Sega Saturn, MS-DOS, 3DO
- Release: 24 November 1995: PlayStation; PAL/NA: 24 November 1995 Saturn; NA: December 1995; PAL: June 1996 MS-DOS 1995 3DO 1996
- Genres: Action-adventure, first-person shooter
- Mode: Single-player

Defcon 5 is a 1995 action-adventure video game developed by Millennium Interactive for the PlayStation, Sega Saturn, MS-DOS and 3DO. The title refers to the condition used to designate normal peacetime military readiness under the DEFCON system, which is commonly misused in popular fiction to indicate a state of emergency as the highest (DEFCON 1) and lowest (DEFCON 5) levels of preparedness on the scale are conflated. The game was originally announced under the title Incoming.

== Plot ==
The main lobby of the Admin block. Tyron corporate logo can be seen on the right.

As a "cyberneer" working for the fictional Tyron Corporation, the player character is tasked with installing automated defence software at the deep space mining installation MRP-6F, a large compound located around the top of a crater in which mining operations take place. Its purpose is to defend the mining installation from hostile attack. For this purpose the installation houses six powerful defence turrets installed around the crater, as well as a myriad of support systems for power generation and munitions stores for those armaments.

Shortly after the player character's arrival at MRP-6F, the installation is attacked by an unknown enemy force. The player character must face enemy fighters as well as invaders searching the base. The overall goal is to escape the installation with evidence of what has transpired.

Facing an enemy intruder in the munitions storage.

== Gameplay ==
The game is reminiscent of the System Shock series in terms of gameplay. The player must explore the base to find items which is needed to establish a line of defence and ultimately escape the installation. This involves fighting off the invading enemies by deploying the defence turrets effectively and using the installation's computer terminals (called "VOS terminals") to hinder the intruder's advance.

The computer terminals in the game offer an unusually wide range of interaction. Players can use them to remotely control the defence turrets, load ammunition and inspect the turrets for damage and deploy combat droids within the installation's perimeters. Doors can be controlled from the VOS terminals to control access to the installation's different areas. The player can use this capability to lock in enemy forces in parts of the installation.

A view of the VOS terminal GUI.

The game also allows the player to fight the invaders by shooting them, but this is discouraged by the fact that new enemies arrive with each passing wave of attacking ships. Also, destroying an enemy greatly degrades the air quality in the immediate area. The computer might even seal doors to polluted areas, sometimes trapping the player. The player can dissolve the pollution by opening doors to adjacent areas, and the pollution levels can be monitored in the VOS terminal's environmental module.'

Defensive software being modified for improved performance.

The installation consists of two major towers with seven floors each (the administrative and domestic blocks), three hangars, a service level, six turrets and a control room. All these are linked by a subway-train like transportation system named "LIMO". Several elevator systems also connect the different levels. This complex layout enables players to avoid enemies by choosing an alternate route to their destination.

== Reception ==
Reception

Review scores
Publication	Score
Electronic Gaming Monthly	7.5/10. 6.5/10, 7/10, 7.5/10 (SAT)
IGN	7/10 (PS1)
Next Generation	4/5 (PS1)
Play	88% (PS1)
Maximum	2/5 (PS1)
Computer Game Review	47/38/62 (DOS)
Sega Saturn Magazine	67% (SAT)

Reviewing the PlayStation version, Bro' Buzz of GamePro summarised Defcon 5 as "tough, slow, and epic." While he remarked that the first-person shooting is very mundane in both gameplay and graphics, and that the game in general would not appeal to impatient gamers, he highly recommended it to strategy enthusiasts due to its innovative VOS interface, well-animated cinematic sequences, and steep, intelligent challenge. Maximum strenuously objected to the game's intellectual pace, arguing that the game's FMV intro leads the player to expect much more shooting action than the game delivers. IGN gave it a 7/10, praising the suspenseful plot, enjoyable action, and realistic, immersive details put into the gameplay. Next Generation emphatically agreed on all IGN's points, particularly the last, remarking that "What really elevates this above its 'like Doom, but' brethren are the little things, none of which, on their own, are that remarkable, but which, taken together, add up to serious fun."

Reviewing the Saturn version, the four reviewers of Electronic Gaming Monthly criticised the pixelation in the graphics but praised the game's story-driven approach, well-designed controls, and combination of puzzle solving, strategy, and action. Sega Saturn Magazine, however, panned the Saturn version, citing poor graphics, a lack of clear objectives, and an overabundance of time spent walking from one place to another. They concluded "This isn't even a poor rip-off of Doom." GamePro's Johnny Ballgame acknowledged the game's originality but ultimately felt that the slow, intellectual pacing was not enjoyable: "You spend most of the time wandering around empty corridors, and after a while you wish the aliens would board the ship so you'd have something to do."
