= Cobra Command (1984 video game) =

1984 LaserDisc-based arcade game

- Mega-CD box art
- Developers: Data East (arcade); Wolf Team (Mega-CD); Ecseco Development (Saturn/PS1)
- Publishers: Data East (arcade); Wolf Team, Sega (Mega-CD); Ecseco Development (Saturn/PS1)
- Designer: Yoshihisa Kishimoto
- Platforms: Arcade, MSX VHD, Mega-CD/Sega CD, Sharp X1, PlayStation, Sega Saturn, Windows, Sharp X68030
- Release: February 1984: Arcade; JP: February 1984; NA: April 1984 MSX; JP: 1985 Mega-CD/Sega CD; JP: August 28, 1992; NA: October 15, 1992; EU: April 2, 1993 Saturn, PlayStation; JP: 1995
- Genres: Interactive movie, shooter
- Modes: Single-player, multiplayer

Cobra Command, known as Thunder Storm (サンダーストーム) in Japan, is an interactive movie shooter game originally released by Data East in 1984 as a LaserDisc-based arcade game. Released as an arcade conversion kit for Bega's Battle (1983), Cobra Command became one of the more successful laserdisc games in 1984. A Mega-CD port of Cobra Command developed by Wolf Team was released in 1992.

== Plot ==
Terrorists are threatening the free world and have amassed a diabolical force. Only the brave pilot of Cobra Command can vanquish the terrorist threat and save the free world from total destruction. The player assumes the role as pilot of the LX-3 Super Cobra helicopter (fictional, but similar to the Bell AH-1 SuperCobra).

The missions go across the New York City streets, the Statue of Liberty, the Atlantic Ocean, Italy, the Grand Canyon and the enemy's headquarters on Easter Island.

== Gameplay ==
The original arcade version is an interactive movie and shooter game where the player watches scenes as the helicopter flies by the conflict zone. The game screen is represented by the helicopter's cockpit, and the player controls a crosshair that can be moved to aim at the enemy forces. The game features a joystick and two buttons: one machine gun and one missile.

In certain moments, the voice of the pilot's commanding officer helps the player out with completing each mission by firing at enemy forces and dodging both enemy fire and natural surroundings, by pressing the joystick or directional pad in the correct direction and at the right time.

If the pilot makes a mistake, the anime sequence shows the Cobra helicopter blown up and the player loses a life. If all lives are lost, the "Game Over" screen shows the Cobra in smoldering ruins and its pilot is presumably dead from the crash.

== Development ==
Kunio-kun and Double Dragon series creator Yoshihisa Kishimoto designed an entirely new game, Cobra Command, using Data East's Bega's Battle hardware. Kishimoto would work later on Road Blaster/Road Avenger, made with the same arcade technology. As the Double Dragon saga was made after those LaserDisc arcades, we can see the LX3 chopper from Cobra Command/Thunder Storm at the beginning of Double Dragon 2, and at some point in the gameplay of Road Blaster/Road Avenger arcade as a nice homage, made by his creator.

Cobra Command was developed by Data East in co-operation with Toei Animation. It was first published in Japan in 1984 as Thunder Storm, then released later the same year in North America as Cobra Command.

== Reception ==
Reception

Review score
Publication	Score
Electronic Gaming Monthly	8/10, 7/10, 7/10, 7/10 (SCD)

In Japan, Game Machine listed Thunder Storm as the most successful upright/cockpit arcade unit of May 1984. It remained at the top of Japan's upright/cockpit arcade cabinet charts from June to August 1984.

In North America, Cobra Command was released as an arcade conversion kit for the previously unsuccessful Bega's Battle. Cobra Command was more successful, becoming one of the more successful LaserDisc games in 1984. In the United States, Cobra Command topped the Play Meter LaserDisc arcade charts from October to November 1984. However, it was not able to achieve mass appeal due to the LaserDisc market being in decline at the time.

Roger C. Sharpe of Play Meter called the arcade game one of the few "shining lights" in the LaserDisc arcade market of 1984. They said it "brought the technology another small step closer to where it will ultimately go in the future."

Reviewing the Sega CD version in Wizard magazine, Glenn Rubenstein praised the high number of levels and unique interface. He gave the game a B−.

On release, Famicom Tsūshin scored the Sega Saturn version of the game 25 out of 40 and the PlayStation version 23 out of 40.

== Legacy ==
Data East released a second game titled Cobra Command in 1988. Unlike the 1984 version, it is a side-scrolling shoot-'em-up.

The Cobra helicopter has a brief cameo in the garage of the Dragon Brothers as they depart in Double Dragon II: The Revenge.

The original Cobra Command was re-released in Japan for the PlayStation and Sega Saturn in 1995 in a two-in-one compilation with Road Blaster, another FMV game produced by the same team.

In November 2009, Revolutionary Concepts developed and published an enhanced iOS version of the original arcade game.

In April 2010, G-Mode released an official port for Windows and Sharp X68030 computers. This product was only available for the Japanese market.
