= B-Wings =

1984 video game

- North American arcade flyer
- Developer: Data East
- Publisher: Data East
- Designer: Akira Sakuma
- Composer: Azusa Hara (Famicom)
- Platforms: Arcade, Famicom
- Release: Arcade: JP: October 1984; NA: Late 1984; Famicom: JP: June 3, 1986
- Genre: Scrolling shooter
- Modes: Single-player, multiplayer

B-Wings (Ｂウィング, B-Uingu) is an action sci-fi vertical shooter first released as an arcade video game by Data East in 1984. A version was released in 1986 for the Family Computer. It was Data East's first home release for the console. The Family Computer version is notable for its inclusion in many unofficial Famiclone multicarts.

== Gameplay ==
The game consists of 45 levels (30 in the Family Computer version), and no background story or plot is given. The player controls the robotic aircraft FX-1, and collects weapon power-up parts (called a "wing") to progress through the levels and ultimately destroy enemy bosses called "Gobunasu" at every end of the level. The game consists of two different top-view screen levels, where the player can press the second button to descend to the ground whenever they do not have a power-up. The player is unaffected by attacks from airborne units while they are playing on the ground level, but the ship is automatically brought back into the air after a certain period of time. The player can still be hit by attacks from ground units while they are on the ground level, and can also lose their ship by crashing into obstacles. The 8-way joystick controls the player's movements, and one button is used for shooting, and the other is used for descending to the ground (or un-equipping wings). The background image continues infinitely when the player scrolls in the horizontal directions.

Arcade screenshot

The game was remade to the Family Computer in 1986, but many changes were made to power-ups, sound effects, enemy attack patterns, and enemy appearances, making the gameplay considerably different from the arcade version. New additional background music was also included, and it also became possible to rapid-fire shots. Several warps and hidden items were also added, along with an ending screen.

=== Weapons ===
Weapons can be equipped onto the player's ship by collecting power-ups that corresponds to certain weapons. Weapons come in the form of "wings" that attaches to the ship's sides and each has different abilities. The weapon can be ejected by pressing the secondary button before equipping a new one, and may also be damaged by enemy attack. Damaged weapons will disintegrate and eject automatically.

- Wingless: The base form of the ship, firing a single projectile at once.
- Cannon: Fires three projectiles in rapid succession, providing a machine gun effect.
- Wide: Fires five projectiles that spread wider as they travel across the screen. If one shot hits an enemy, all other shots automatically disappear and are fired again.
- Multi: Fires three projectiles that changes direction between four different angles.
- Van: Fires six projectiles (five in the arcade version) that travels radially for an extremely short distance, forming a defensive barrier.
- Side: Fires seven projectiles, three each to the left and right and one forward.
- Anti: Fires four projectiles, two forwards (only one in the arcade version) and two backwards, allowing it to attack enemies coming from behind.
- Ground: Fires two projectiles to the ground platform to attack enemies on the lower level. Only appears in the original arcade version.
- Jump: Fires three projectiles, with one that is able to jump over any obstacle and explode after traveling a certain distance. An enemy or obstacle will only be destroyed if this projectile explodes upon them.
- Hammer: Fires three projectiles in rapid succession and comes equipped with a pair of rotating spherical shields, partially protecting the ship from enemy attacks. Only available in the Famicom version.
- Dyna: Fires a short-range beam that goes through any enemy. Only available in the Famicom version.
- Fire: Fires a jet of flames capable of penetrating enemies and bosses. Only available in the Famicom version.

=== Special weapons ===
In the Family Computer version, there are three additional weapons hidden in several levels, usually underneath obstacles:

- Sterling-Silver: Fires green rings that behave similarly to the Dyna, and it has shield mechanism similar to the Hammer.
- Aurora-Harrier: Fires four helical-shaped beams, each to every directions around the ship.
- Oct-Blaster: Fires eight projectiles around the ship in all directions.

=== Items ===
In the Family Computer version, several items are scattered throughout the levels, usually hidden underneath certain obstacle structures or randomly flying around the screen. Certain items became useless when shot (in which it turns into an umbrella), while others will change its effect:

- Voltage: Allows the player to store spare weapons, which can be used by pausing the game and pressing the "select" button. This can only be used once, but can be stocked up.
- Comet: Teleports the player four levels ahead, skipping any bosses at the cost of extra points.
- Random weapons can be found at intervals throughout a level, which is the most suitable weapon for a certain area. To obtain it, the attached flying pods must be destroyed to release the weapon.
- Letters: A diamond-like object with a letter that changes randomly when shot. Each letter corresponds to a specific weapon when picked up.
- Card Decks: Grants the player an extra life or additional protection for the ship.

== Reception ==
In Japan, Game Machine listed B-Wings on their November 15, 1984 issue as being the most-successful table arcade unit of the month.
