= Laser War =

1987 pinball machine

- Laser War flyer
- Manufacturer: Data East Pinball
- Release date: May 1987
- System: DataEast/Sega Version 1
- Design: Joe Kaminkow
- Programming: Rehman Merchant
- Artwork: Kevin O'Connor, Margaret Hudson
- Music: David Thiel
- Sound: David Thiel
- Production run: 2,569

Laser War is the first pinball machine that was produced by Data East Pinball. It was the first pinball machine to feature digital stereo sound, and is loosely based on Lazer Tag.

Data East had been trying to get a pinball division for 2 years before this machine to sell them through their existing distribution network. The game was first revealed at the 1987 American Coin Machine Exposition (ACME) held in New Orleans from March 20-22, and completed and tested before its release in May 1987.

== Design ==
This is notable as the "first pinball specifically designed for digital stereo", which included a subwoofer. There are separate ROMs for voice and music, and includes advanced speech. The digital speakers are in a chrome enclosure inside the backbox, and are slightly angled to face the player. While David Thiel assisted with some previous machines, this is the first machine that he completed all of the sound and music for. The machine uses a Motorola 6809 processor, and the sound was stored in a 64K ROM.

The backglass shows a laser war in progress, for which a photo shoot was staged.

=== Topper ===
The machine was designed with a topper, but only the first 500 or so machines were issued with one. This is based on the Lyte sound visualizer manufactured by Clyde Industries which displays kaleidoscopic patterns from audio input. This is housed in a trapezoidal case, and uses the unamplified sound from the sound board for its input.

== Layout ==
There is a kickback in the left outlane. There are three groups of three stand-up targets: red on the left side, blue on the right side, and yellow towards the middle. There is a corresponding lock/kickout for each colour, with the red and yellow including a spinner that the ball hits before reaching them. The table has a single ramp, with a wireform return to the right flipper; where this ramp turns a laser-gun turret is located which lights up at various points during a game. The top left of the machine has W-A-R rollovers just above three pop-bumpers.

== Gameplay ==
The table is controlled with two flippers, and has a manual plunger. By hitting all three targets in a colour group the player lights a lock, and after locking two balls, the two ball multiball starts. This can be turned into a three ball multiball by locking these balls again, which enables a jackpot to be collected by hitting the ramp.

In a multiplayer game the game has a "point spread" feature showing difference to other players scores.

== Reception ==
In a review for Play Meter, Roger Sharpe gave the game 3.5/4. He stated that the layout is fair to an average player, yet still challenging for a more skilled player. It was also the cover story for the April 1987 issue of RePlay magazine. The Pinball Trader thought it was a good game, and preferred the artwork on the backglass to that on the playfield.
