= Teenage Mutant Ninja Turtles (pinball) =

1991 pinball game

- Manufacturer: Data East
- Release date: June 1991
- System: DataEast/Sega Version 3
- Model #: 17
- Players: 4 Players
- Design: Joe Kaminkow, Ed Cebula
- Programming: Neil Falconer
- Artwork: Kevin O'Connor, Paul Faris
- Voices: Fred Young
- Production run: 3750

Teenage Mutant Ninja Turtles is a 1991 pinball machine designed by Joe Kaminkow and Ed Cebula. It is based on the comic book characters of the same name, and was preceded by a related TV series and feature film. The game uses the action figures made by Playmates Toys as decoration for the table. A second Teenage Mutant Ninja Turtles pinball machine was released by Stern Pinball in June 2020.

== 1991 Data East version ==
=== Gameplay ===
This machine has the following features:

- 2 ramps
- 3 bumpers
- 3-ball multiball
- Spinning pizza and ramps

=== Reception ===
In Japan, Game Machine listed Teenage Mutant Ninja Turtles on their June 1, 1991 issue as being the second most-successful flipper unit of the year.

Play Meter found it to be an exciting game, with the music and artwork praised. The inconsistency of the players role in the plot was criticized.

== 2020 Stern version ==
Teenage Mutant Ninja Turtles
- Manufacturer: Stern Pinball
- Release date: June 2020
- System: Stern SPIKE™ 2 System
- Players: 4 Players
- Design: John Borg
- Programming: Dwight Sullivan, Dean Grover, Corey Stup, Mike Vinikour
- Artwork: Jeremy Packer (Zombie Yeti)
- Music: Shawn Myers
- Sound: Jerry Thompson
- Voices: Mike Kyzivat, Tom Kyzivat, Marc Silk

=== Overview ===
Stern created three versions; Pro, Premium and Limited Edition.

The Limited Edition model is limited to 500 units and features a numbered plaque, custom-themed backglass, cabinet artwork and art blades as well as a shaker motor and anti-reflection glass.

=== Reception ===
Nudge Pinball found it to be a difficult but beautiful game with a deep gameplay.
