= LaserActive =

Video game console

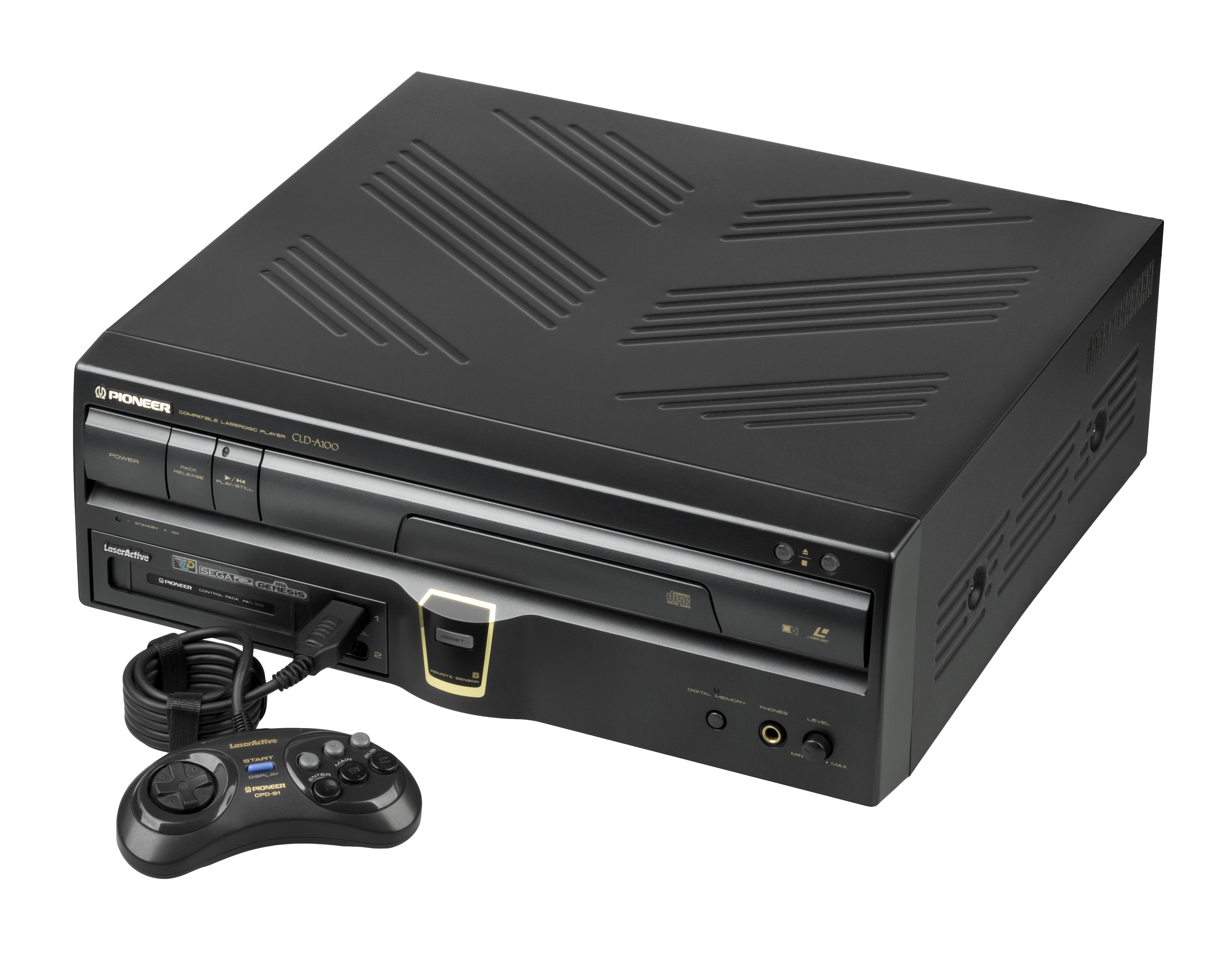
- LaserActive CLD-A100 with the Sega Genesis PAC module installed
- Also known as: NEC LD-ROM² System
- Manufacturer: Pioneer Corporation
- Product family: LaserDisc
- Type: Converged device, home video game console
- Generation: Fourth
- Released: JP: August 20, 1993; NA: September 13, 1993
- Introductory price: ¥89,800 (equivalent to ¥102,220 in 2024); US$970 (equivalent to $2,162 in 2025)
- Discontinued: 1996
- Units sold: est. 10,000
- Media: Native: LaserDisc, CD; With LD-ROM² PAC: LD-ROM (LD‑ROM²), CD-ROM (CD-ROM²), Hucard; With Mega-LD PAC: LD-ROM (Mega‑LD), CD-ROM (Mega-CD/Sega CD), Sega Genesis/Mega Drive cartridges
- Controller input: Sega Genesis 6-Button Controller; Turbografx-16 Controller

The LaserActive (Japanese: レーザーアクティブ, Hepburn: Rēzā Akutibu) is a hybrid LaserDisc player and home video game console released by Pioneer Corporation in 1993. Marketed as a high-end, modular entertainment system, it was designed to combine movies, music, and video games into a single unit. Out of the box, the base unit could natively play standard LaserDiscs and compact discs, but support for video games required optional expansion modules known as PACs. Each PAC enabled compatibility with a specific gaming platform and its media formats.

With the Mega-LD PAC, the system could play exclusive Mega-LD discs (a proprietary LD-ROM format), as well as Sega Genesis/Mega Drive cartridges and Sega CD/Mega-CD discs. With the LD-ROM² PAC, it supported exclusive LD-ROM² discs, along with HuCard cartridges and CD-ROM² discs for the PC Engine/TurboGrafx-16. The LaserActive was the only system capable of playing LD-ROM game discs, which were not cross-compatible between PACs.

Pioneer released LaserActive model CLD-A100 in Japan on August 20, 1993, for ¥89,800 (equivalent to ¥102,220 in 2024), and in North America on September 13, 1993, for US$970 (equivalent to $2,162 in 2025). An NEC-branded version of the player, the LD-ROM² System (model PCE-LD1), launched in December 1993 at the same price and was fully compatible with Pioneer's PAC modules. The LaserActive was discontinued in 1996, with approximately 10,000 units sold.

== Accessories ==
=== PAC modules ===
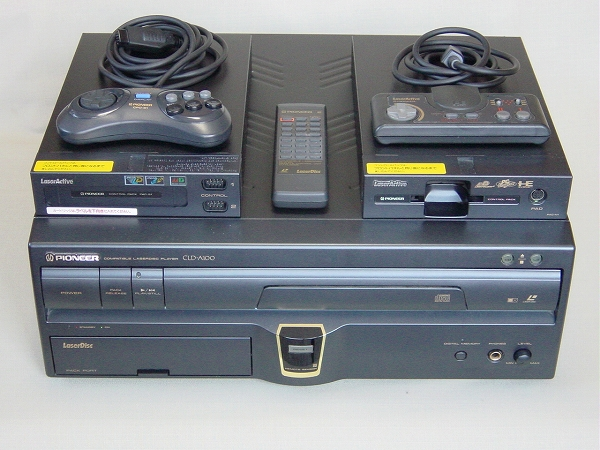
LaserActive CLD-A100 and on top are, from left: Mega-LD PAC with controller, standard 24-button remote, and LD-ROM² PAC with controller

Pioneer released several expansion modules, known as "PACs," which enabled the LaserActive to play software from other platforms and expand its capabilities. In each case, the Japanese model number is listed first, followed by the North American version.

Mega-LD PAC (PAC-S1 / PAC-S10)
Developed with Sega, this PAC enabled support for Mega-LD software as well as standard Genesis cartridges, Sega CD discs, and CD+G discs. It included a LaserActive-branded 6-button Genesis controller (model CPD-S1) and retailed for US$600 (equivalent to $1,337 in 2025). It was the most widely adopted module among LaserActive owners.

LD-ROM² PAC (PAC-N1 / PAC-N10)
Developed with NEC, this PAC added support for LD-ROM² titles, along with HuCard cartridges, CD-ROM² discs, and CD+G discs. The Japanese model could also play Arcade CD-ROM² titles using an Arcade Card Duo. Like the Sega module, it sold for US$600 (equivalent to $1,337 in 2025) and included a branded Turbo Pad (CPD-N1/CPD-N10). NEC also released a version in their branding called the PC Engine PAC (model PCE-LP1). Due to the TurboGrafx-16's limited success in North America, the PAC-N10 is significantly rarer than its Sega counterpart.

Karaoke PAC (PAC-K1)
This PAC enabled playback of the LD-ROM-based LaserKaraoke (LD-G) discs. It featured two microphone inputs with individual volume and tone controls. Retail price was approximately US$350 (equivalent to $780 in 2025).

Computer Interface PAC (PAC-PC1)
This PAC was equipped with an RS-232 port, allowing the CLD-A100 to be controlled with custom computer software. It shipped with a 33-button infrared remote (more advanced than the standard 24-button remote) and program for MS-DOS and Classic Mac OS called LaserActive Program Editor on floppy disk. It includes demo programs for the Tenchi Muyo! LaserDisc series.

=== LaserActive 3-D Goggles ===
The LaserActive 3-D Goggles (model GOL-1) used an active shutter 3D system compatible with several LD-ROM titles, including 3-D Museum (1994), Vajra 2 (1994), Virtual Cameraman 2 (1994), Dr. Paolo no Totteoki Video (1994), Goku (1995), and 3D Virtual Australia (1996), the last official LaserActive release.

The goggles could also display 3D autostereogram images. A separate goggle adapter (model ADP-1) allowed one or two goggles to connect to the CLD-A100.

== Software ==
The LaserActive uses a unique disc format called LD-ROM (LaserDisc Read-Only Memory). Like the LV-ROM format on which it is based, the LD-ROM is an optical disc format that can store analog video, analog audio, and computer files (in a file system) on the same side of a disc. LD-ROMs do not use the same file system as LV-ROMs, however; also, an LD-ROM can store up to 540 megabytes of file data, compared with LV-ROM's 324. An LD-ROM can store up to 60 minutes of analog audio and video alongside the digital file system.

The tables below list 31 software titles released on LD-ROM for the LaserActive; of these, 13 were released only in Japan. 23 of the 31 were made for the Mega LD PAC, and 15 were made for the LD-ROM² PAC. Only a handful of titles were released in both formats.

One additional title listed below, Myst, was never officially released for the LaserActive. Circa 1995, a game developer named Brian Rice (of Brian Rice Inc.) was leading the conversion of Myst to Mega LD. Conversion was almost entirely complete, and the game was to be published by Sunsoft. But, Rice encountered a major problem. Normally, an animated dissolve or wipe effect transitioned the view when the player moved between scenes in the game. Each transition animation had six frames. Yet in some circumstances, the animation did not stop at the sixth frame, but continued to shift the player's view to other scenes in the game. Rice ascribed the runaway animation to a bug in the LaserActive hardware. Development and publication were scrapped.

Another unreleased game, called Steel Driver, is rumored to exist.

The tables below list 32 unique titles for the LaserActive, comprising 22 released games, 9 applications, and one unreleased game.

North American market
| Title | Language options | | LD-ROM² | | Mega LD | |
| Title | Japanese | English | Release date | Catalog number | Release date | Catalog number |
|---|---|---|---|---|---|---|
| 3D Museum | No | Yes | 1994 | PEANU1012 | 1994 | PEASU1012 |
| Don Quixote: A Dream in Seven Crystals | No | Yes | Unavailable as LD-ROM² | | 1994 | PEASU5022 |
| Ghost Rush! | Yes | Yes | Unavailable as LD-ROM² | | 1995 | PEASU1018 |
| Goku | No | Yes | Unavailable as LD-ROM² | | 1995 | PEASU1010 |
| The Great Pyramid | Yes | Yes | Unavailable as LD-ROM² | | 1993 | PEASU5002 |
| Hi-Roller Battle | Yes | Yes | Unavailable as LD-ROM² | | 1993 | PEASU1002 |
| Hyperion | No | Yes | Unavailable as LD-ROM² | | 1994 | PEASU5019 |
| I Will: The Story of London | Yes | Yes | Unavailable as LD-ROM² | | 1993 | PEASU1001 |
| J.B. Harold - Blue Chicago Blues | Yes | Yes | Unavailable as LD-ROM² | | 1995 | PEASU5036 |
| J.B. Harold - Manhattan Requiem | Yes | Yes | 1993 | PEANU5004 | Unavailable as Mega LD | |
| Melon Brains | No | Yes | Unavailable as LD-ROM² | | 1994 | PEASU1011 |
| Myst | No | Yes | Unavailable as LD-ROM² | | Unreleased | |
| Pyramid Patrol | No | Yes | Unavailable as LD-ROM² | | 1993 | PEASU5001 |
| Quiz Econosaurus | Yes | Yes | 1993 | PEANU5001 | Unavailable as Mega LD | |
| Road Prosecutor (Note: Road Prosecutor is the localized title of Road Blaster (aka Road Avenger).) | Yes | Yes | Unavailable as LD-ROM² | | 1995 | PEASU1033 |
| Rocket Coaster | No | Yes | Unavailable as LD-ROM² | | 1993 | PEASU5013 |
| Space Berserker | Yes | No | Unavailable as LD-ROM² | | 1993 | PEASU1003 |
| Triad Stone | Yes | Yes | Unavailable as LD-ROM² | | 1994 | PEASU5014 |
| Vajra | No | Yes | 1993 | PEANU1001 | Unavailable as Mega LD | |

Japanese market
| Title | Language options | | LD-ROM² | | Mega LD | |
| Title | Japanese | English | Release date | Catalog number | Release date | Catalog number |
|---|---|---|---|---|---|---|
| 3D Museum | No | Yes | 25 June 1994 | PEANJ1012 | 25 February 1994 | PEASJ1012 |
| 3D Virtual Australia (Note: Released only in Japan.) | Yes | No | Unavailable as LD-ROM² | | 11 March 1996 | PEASJ5042 |
| Akuma no Shinban (Demon's Judgment) | Yes | No | 20 August 1993 | PEANJ5003 | Unavailable as Mega LD | |
| Angel Mate | Yes | No | 25 October 1993 | PEANJ5002 | Unavailable as Mega LD | |
| Back to the Edo | Yes | No | Unavailable as LD-ROM² | | 22 December 1994 | PEASJ5021 |
| Billusion Collection: Minayo Watanabe | Yes | No | 25 October 1994 | PEANJ5025 | 25 February 1995 | PEASJ5025 |
| Billusion Collection, Vol. 2: Yuko Sakaki | Yes | No | 25 November 1994 | PEANJ5028 | 25 April 1995 | PEASJ5028 |
| Don Quixote: A Dream in Seven Crystals | Yes | No | Unavailable as LD-ROM² | | 22 December 1994 | PEASJ5022 |
| Dora Dora Paradise | Yes | No | 25 March 1994 | PEANJ5005 | Unavailable as Mega LD | |
| Dr. Paolo no Totteoki Video | Yes | No | Unavailable as LD-ROM² | | 25 October 1994 | PEASJ5030 |
| Ghost Rush! | Yes | Yes | Unavailable as LD-ROM² | | 3 December 1994 | PEASJ1018 |
| Goku | Yes | No | 20 October 1995 | PEANJ1032 | 15 June 1995 | PEASJ1010 |
| The Great Pyramid | Yes | Yes | Unavailable as LD-ROM² | | 20 August 1993 | PEASJ5002 |
| Hi-Roller Battle | Yes | Yes | Unavailable as LD-ROM² | | 20 December 1993 | PEASJ1002 |
| Hyperion | No | Yes | Unavailable as LD-ROM² | | 27 May 1994 | PEASJ5019 |
| I Will: The Story of London | Yes | Yes | Unavailable as LD-ROM² | | 20 August 1993 | PEASJ1001 |
| J.B. Harold - Blue Chicago Blues | Yes | Yes | 20 December 1994 | PEANJ5017 | 15 April 1995 | PEASJ5036 |
| J.B. Harold - Manhattan Requiem | Yes | Yes | 25 October 1993 | PEANJ5004 | Unavailable as Mega LD | |
| Melon Brains | Yes | No | 15 December 1994 | PEANJ1031 | 20 September 1994 | PEASJ1011 |
| Pyramid Patrol | No | Yes | Unavailable as LD-ROM² | | 20 August 1993 | PEASJ5001 |
| Quiz Econosaurus | Yes | Yes | 20 August 1993 | PEANJ5001 | Unavailable as Mega LD | |
| Road Blaster | Yes | Yes | Unavailable as LD-ROM² | | 25 January 1995 | PEASJ1033 |
| Rocket Coaster | No | Yes | Unavailable as LD-ROM² | | 20 December 1993 | PEASJ5013 |
| Space Berserker | Yes | No | Unavailable as LD-ROM² | | 25 February 1994 | PEASJ1003 |
| Time Gal | Yes | No | Unavailable as LD-ROM² | | 25 March 1995 | PEASJ5039 |
| Triad Stone | Yes | Yes | Unavailable as LD-ROM² | | 25 March 1994 | PEASJ5014 |
| Vajra | No | Yes | 25 October 1993 | PEANJ1001 | Unavailable as Mega LD | |
| Vajra 2 | No | Yes | 31 October 1994 | PEANJ1016 | Unavailable as Mega LD | |
| Virtual Cameraman | Yes | No | Unavailable as LD-ROM² | | 10 December 1993 | PEASJ5015 |
| Virtual Cameraman 2: Phuket, Thailand / Pickup Compilation | Yes | No | Unavailable as LD-ROM² | | 15 April 1994 | PEASJ5020 |
| Zapping "Satsui" | Yes | Yes | 10 June 1994 | PEANJ5023 | 25 August 1994 | PEASJ5024 |

== Contemporary devices ==
In the early 1990s, a number of consumer electronics manufacturers designed converged devices around CD-ROM technology. At the time, CD-ROM systems were expensive. The LaserActive was one of several multipurpose, multi-format, upmarket home entertainment systems with software stored on optical discs. These systems were premised on early conceptions of multimedia entertainment.

Some comparable systems are the Commodore CDTV, Philips CD-i, 3DO Interactive Multiplayer, and Tandy Video Information System.

== Reception ==
Computer Gaming World in January 1994 stated that although LaserActive was "a better product in many ways" than 3DO, it lacked software and the NEC and Sega control packs were too expensive.

== See also ==
- LD-ROM
- Edutainment
- Multimedia PC
