= Tag Team Wrestling =

1983 video game

- North American arcade flyer
- Developer: Technōs Japan (Note: Apple II, Commodore 64, and IBM PC versions developed by Quicksilver Software; NES version developed by Data East and Sakata SAS.)
- Publishers: Data East: C64, IBM PC; NA: Data East; EU: U.S. Gold NES; JP: Namco; NA: Data East
- Platforms: Arcade, NES, Commodore 64, IBM PC, Apple II
- Release: December 20, 1983: Arcade; JP: December 20, 1983; NA: January 1984 NES; JP: April 2, 1986; NA: October 1986 C64; NA: October 1986; EU: 1987 IBM PC; EU: 1986 Apple II; August 1987
- Genre: Sports (professional wrestling)
- Modes: Single-player, multiplayer

Tag Team Wrestling, known as The Big Pro Wrestling! (Note: Japanese: ザ・ビッグプロレスリング, Hepburn: Za Biggu Puro Resuringu) in Japan, is a 1983 wrestling video game developed by Technōs Japan and published by Data East for arcades. It was later ported to the Nintendo Entertainment System, Commodore 64, IBM PC and Apple II.

Hamster Corporation released the game as part of their Arcade Archives series for the Nintendo Switch and PlayStation 4, as well as their Arcade Archives 2 series for the Nintendo Switch 2, PlayStation 5 and Xbox Series X/S in May 2026.

== Gameplay ==
In the original game, the player controls a professional wrestling tag-team, two identical wrestlers with black hair, orange trunks and brown boots named Sunny and Terry (Jocko and Spike in the U.S. version) who must defeat a couple of masked wrestlers known as the Heel Team (Mad Maulers in the U.S. version): one of them a skinny wrestler with an orange mask and boots and white trunks, the other a fat wrestler in a black mask and tights with white boots. The player's team must continually beat the Heel Team in order to win trophies and maintain gameplay. After the tenth match, the player's team is designated the world champions and must keep playing in order to maintain their title. In the event of the Heel Team winning or tying a match, the game is over.

The player is provided with a joystick and two buttons: a "select" button and an "action/pin" button. The player uses the joystick to move Sunny or Terry around the ring, where they must make contact with the member of the Heel Team (in the first match, the skinny wrestler from the Heel Team starts, then the fat one in the second, and it continues that way from there on in, as does with the player's wrestlers). Upon making contact with the opposing wrestler, the two wrestlers will immediately grapple. The player then releases the opposing wrestler by pulling away, then grappling again, waiting for the "Action" command to flash onscreen. Due to being one of the earliest professional wrestling video games, Tag Team Wrestling has a limited number of wrestling moves and characters. Moves and counters are performed through the use of a real-time, menu-based action-reaction fighting module. After engaging in a grapple with the "Action" command flashing, players quickly scroll through a menu and choose a maneuver to perform.

In the NES version, two professional wrestling tag-teams, the Strong Bads and the Ricky Fighters, battle against each other in tag-team action, or a single player competes in a series of tournaments to win ever larger trophies. Each of the four characters has a unique move that can only be used against one other rival wrestler.

== Ports and related releases ==
Arguably, the most well known port is the Family Computer/Nintendo Entertainment System version created in 1986. The development of this port was a joint venture between Data East (for graphics & sound) and Sakata SAS (for programming). It was published in Japan by Namco as Tag Team Pro Wrestling (タッグチーム プロレスリング) on April 2, 1986. In North America, this version was released on October the same year by Data East for the NES, keeping the Tag Team Wrestling title. This was Data East's first title for the NES and one of the earliest third-party video games for the console in North America.

The arcade game was ported by Quicksilver Software to the Commodore 64 in 1986 and the Apple IIC in 1987, both of which were published by Data East in the United States. Although neither the arcade or NES versions were distributed in Europe, U.S. Gold released ports for the IBM PC in 1986 and the Commodore 64 in 1987. A release for the IBM PC in the United States by Data East was also scheduled for the last quarter of 1988.

== Reception ==
In Japan, Game Machine listed Tag Team Wrestling as the top-grossing new table arcade cabinet of January 1984. It later topped Japan's table arcade game charts in February 1984.

== See also ==
- Strong Bad, a fictional character inspired by the video game
- Mat Mania
