= Star Wars (1992 pinball) =

1992 pinball machine

- Manufacturer: Data East
- Release date: December 1992
- System: DataEast/Sega Version 3
- Design: John Borg
- Programming: Neil Falconer, Lonnie D. Ropp
- Artwork: Markus Rothkranz
- Music: Brian L. Schmidt
- Sound: Brian L. Schmidt
- Production run: 10,400 units

Star Wars is a 1992 pinball machine released by Data East. It is based on the Star Wars original trilogy of films.

== Design and layout ==
John Borg was in the process of creating a layout for a table based on Jurassic Park, but when offered Star Wars by Joe Kamikow adapted the layout, replacing a mechanical dinosaur with the Death Star.

With a production run of 10,400 machines this was Data East's most successful pinball game. It features the voice of Darth Vader, a video mode, and a rotating silver globe representing the Death Star. On the left, above the 4 pop bumpers, is R2-D2 who can rotate and move up and down. The plunger is controlled by a button on a handle which can move up or down.

Voice actor Fred Young recorded all voices for this game except for R2D2 and Princess Leia.

== Gameplay ==
The game begins with a skillshot where the player presses the plunger button to time shooting a fighter shown on the dot matrix display (DMD). The player attempts to start multiball by hitting the Death Star a number of times, or using the plunger handle to open it and hit a ball in it to start a mode where jackpots may be scored.

Other game features include spelling Star Wars with orbit or ramp shots, hitting the Sarlacc pit right scoop, which can also give Jabba the Hutt rewards. The force and dark side awards, and X-wing millions can be awarded from the left scoop. There are also hurry-ups involving C3PO, and the spinning R2D2.

== Reception ==
In a brief review CVG rated the machine at 89%.

An article in The Flipside appreciated the music but found the voices hard to understand. The rule of the ballsaver turning off after two switches are hit was found to be unfair. While rule development had improved over earlier Data East games, the main objective was still to get jackpots in triball (i.e. multiball).

A semi-official update, tweaking and refining the gameplay rules was released 20 years later.
