= Cobra Command (1988 video game) =

1988 video game

- Japanese arcade flyer
- Developer: Data East
- Publisher: Data East
- Director: T. Seki
- Producer: Kohji Sasamoto
- Designers: Akira Otani; Kazuhiro Takayama (hardware)
- Programmer: Kohji Sasamoto
- Artists: Akira Otani; M. Narita; T. Konishi; Satoshi Furukawa
- Composers: Shogo Sakai, Masaaki Iwasaki, Takafumi Miura (NES); Azusa Hara
- Platforms: Arcade, NES, PC
- Release: September 1988: Arcade; November 1988: NES; January 1989: PC
- Genre: Scrolling shooter
- Modes: Single-player, multiplayer

Cobra Command (コブラコマンド) is a horizontally scrolling shooter released as an arcade video game by Data East in 1988. A port was published for the Nintendo Entertainment System later the same year.

== Gameplay ==
Cobra Command is a horizontally scrolling shooter in which the player takes control of a heavily armored helicopter through six stages to destroy enemy tanks, cannons, submarines, and gunboats. There are missions to Sumatra, Java, Borneo, South China Sea, Siam, and the enemy's headquarters.

== Ports ==
North American NES box cover

The NES port of Cobra Command was released the same year as the arcade game. Unlike the arcade game, the NES version does not scroll automatically, and its gameplay is similar to Choplifter as the main goal of each level is to rescue all of the hostages. Also, throughout the game, the player's helicopter can be upgraded by landing in certain areas.

Data East also published a port for home computers by January 1989.

== Reception ==
In Japan, Game Machine listed the game on their October 15, 1988 issue as being the sixth most-successful table arcade unit of the month.

In the United States, the home computer port sold more than 50,000 units by January 1989.
