= Data East =

Japanese video game and electronics company

Data East Corporation
- Native name: データイースト株式会社
- Romanized name: Dēta Īsuto kabushiki gaisha
- Type: Private KK
- Industry: Video games, engineering
- Founded: April 20, 1976: 50 years ago
- Founder: Tetsuo Fukuda
- Defunct: June 25, 2003: 22 years ago
- Fate: Bankruptcy
- Successor: G-Mode
- Headquarters: Suginami, Tokyo, Japan
- Products: List of Data East games
- Total equity: ¥282.5 million (April 2001)
- Subsidiaries: Data East USA, Inc. Data East Pinball Inc.
- Website: dataeast-corp.co.jp/

Data East Corporation (データイースト株式会社, Dēta Īsuto kabushiki gaisha), also abbreviated as DECO, was a Japanese video game, pinball and electronic engineering company. The company was in operation from 1976 to 2003, and released 150 video game titles. At one time, the company had annual sales of 20 billion yen in the United States alone but eventually went bankrupt. Its American subsidiary, Data East USA, was headquartered in San Jose, California. Its main headquarters were located in the Suginami ward of Tokyo.

The majority of Data East's video games, its trademark, and its logo are currently owned by G-Mode, a mobile-focused subsidiary of the video game publisher Marvelous. A small number of Data East video games are owned by other companies, notably Paon DP.

== History ==
Data East was founded on April 20, 1976, by Tokai University alumnus Tetsuo Fukuda. Data East developed and released in July 1977 its first arcade game Jack Lot, a medal game based on Blackjack for business use. This was followed in January 1978 by Super Break which was its first actual video game. More than 15 arcade games were released by Data East in the 1970s.

Data East established its U.S. division in June 1979. In 1980, Data East published Astro Fighter which became its first major arcade game title. While making games, Data East released a series of interchangeable systems compatible with its arcade games, notably the DECO Cassette System which soon became infamous among users due to technical problems. Data East dropped the DECO Cassette by 1985. It was the first interchangeable arcade system board, developed in 1979 and released in 1980, inspiring later arcade conversion systems such as Sega's Convert-a-Game in 1981 and the Nintendo VS. System in 1984. Data East abandoned the DECO Cassette System in favor of dedicated arcade cabinets, bringing Data East greater success over the next several years, starting with the hit title BurgerTime (1982).

In 1981, three staff members of Data East founded Technōs Japan, who then supported Data East for a while before becoming completely independent.

=== Expansion and arcade success ===
In 1983, the company moved its headquarters to a new building in Ogikubo, Suginami, where it stayed for the remainder of its lifespan. In March 1985, Data East Europe was established in London. Data East continued to release arcade video games over the next 15 years following the video game crash of 1983.

Data East distributed three major arcade hits in North America between 1984 and 1985: the fighting game Karate Champ (1984), the beat 'em up title Kung-Fu Master (1984), and the run and gun video game Commando (1985). These three titles catapulted Data East to the forefront of the amusement arcade industry in the mid-1980s. Karate Champ, Kung-Fu Master and Commando were the top three highest-grossing arcade games of 1985 in the United States. Karate Champ was the first successful fighting game, and one of the most influential to modern fighting game standards. Some of Data East's other most famous coin-op arcade games from its 1980s heyday include Heavy Barrel, Bad Dudes Vs. DragonNinja, Sly Spy, RoboCop, Bump 'n' Jump, Trio the Punch, Karnov and Atomic Runner Chelnov.

Data East also purchased licenses to manufacture and sell arcade games created by other companies. Some of its licensed games included Kid Niki: Radical Ninja, Kung-Fu Master and Vigilante, all licensed from Irem, and Commando, licensed from Capcom. It had a brief stint as a Neo Geo arcade licensee in the mid-1990s, starting with Spinmaster and co-published with SNK.

=== Home consoles ===
Following its arcade success, Data East made a successful entry in the home computer game market with a 1985 port of Karate Champ, which became the first home computer game to sell more than 500,000 copies in the United States by January 1989. It became the subject of the litigation Data East USA, Inc. v. Epyx, Inc., in which Data East alleged that the computer game International Karate (1985), published by Epyx, infringed the copyright of Karate Champ.

Data East entered the video game console market in 1986 with the release of B-Wings for the Famicom. (Note: B-Wings was the first console game published by Data East itself. But the company had previously self-developed ports for the Famicom that were sold by Namco, namely BurgerTime and Tag Team Pro Wrestling.) In North America, the subsidiary Data East USA was the first licensee announced for the Nintendo Entertainment System and consequently was one of the four original third-party publishers to release games for the console in late 1986. In Japan, Data East would become a licensee for several home systems over the years, notably the Famicom (1986), PC Engine (1988), Game Boy (1990), Mega Drive (1991), Super NES (1991), Neo Geo (1993), Sega Saturn (1995), PlayStation (1996), WonderSwan (1999) and Neo Geo Pocket Color (1999). Several of Data East's video games series, such as Tantei Jingūji Saburō, Glory of Hercules and Metal Max, were created specifically for home consoles. Data East had a good relationship with Ocean Software to publish titles for the American market throughout the late 1980s and early 1990s, even before Ocean started its own American arm led by Data East boss Ray Musci.

=== Data East Pinball ===
Data East Pinball was formed as a subsidiary of Data East USA, and manufactured pinball machines from 1987 through to 1994. These included innovations such as the first pinball to have stereo sound (Laser War), the first usage of a small dot-matrix display in Checkpoint along with the first usage of a big DMD (192x64) in Maverick. In designing pinball machines it showed a strong preference for using high-profile (but expensive) licensed properties, rather than creating totally original machines, which did not help the financial difficulties the company began experiencing from 1990 on. Some of the properties that Data East licensed for its pinball machines included Guns N' Roses, Star Wars, Back to the Future, Batman, RoboCop, The Simpsons, and Teenage Mutant Ninja Turtles. Data East is the only company that manufactured custom pinball games (e.g., for Aaron Spelling, the movie Richie Rich, or Michael Jordan), though these were basically mods of existing or soon to be released pinball machines (e.g., Lethal Weapon 3).

Amidst plummeting sales across the entire pinball market, Data East chose to exit the pinball business and sold the factory to Sega in 1994. At the time of the buyout by Sega, Data East Pinball was the world's second-largest pinball manufacturer, holding 25 percent of the market. Although all of Data East's pinball games were developed in the United States, several were released in Japan by the parent company.

=== Non-gaming ===
Although video games represented the majority of the company's revenue, Data East had always been involved in engineering. Outside of video games, Data East produced image transmission equipment, data communication adapters for satellite phones from NTT DoCoMo, and developed electrocardiogram equipment for ambulances. According to the company's website, its Datafax product, released in 1983, was the world's first portable fax machine.

=== Bankruptcy ===
By the end of the 1990s, the company's American division, Data East USA, was liquidated. No official announcement of this was made; instead, calls to Data East USA's offices were greeted with a prerecorded message from marketing manager Jay Malpas stating that the company had closed its doors before Christmas 1996. Its final releases were Defcon 5 and Creature Shock: Special Edition. The Japanese parent company itself announced its departure from the arcade industry entirely on December 4, 1997, and had accumulated a debt estimated at 3.3 billion yen. Data East filed for reorganization in 1999 and stopped making video games altogether. All customer support pertaining to video games was halted in March 2000.

For the following three years, Data East sold negative ion generators, continued to develop compatible devices for NTT DoCoMo phones and licensed some of its old video games to other companies. Nonetheless, the company's restructuring efforts were not enough to put back the financial problems brought by the 1990s. Consequently, in April 2003, Data East filed for bankruptcy and was finally declared bankrupt by a Tokyo district court on June 25, 2003. The news was released to the public two weeks later, on July 8.

== Aftermath ==
Most of Data East's video game library was acquired in February 2004 by G-Mode, a Japanese mobile gaming company that is now owned by Marvelous. G-Mode also owns the Data East trademark. Other games are owned by Paon DP instead of G-Mode, notably Karnov, Chelnov, Windjammers, the Glory of Heracles series and the Kuuga trilogy, while the rights to the series Metal Max and Jake Hunter currently are the properties of Kadokawa Games and Arc System Works, respectively. The RoboCop titles related to Data East were acquired by D4 Enterprise in September 2010. The other properties of Data East were transferred to the asset management company of the Fukuda family. The latter sued Nintendo twice during the 2000s for patent infringement, but both cases were dismissed.

Data East's former building in Ogikubo, which was located in an area largely residential, was demolished around 2014 and replaced by an apartment or condominium construction. Founder Tetsuo Fukuda was still active in 2017 as president of a medical company he established in December 2015 at the age of 76.

== See also ==
- List of Data East games
