= Magical Drop (video game) =

1995 video game

- Developer: Data East
- Publisher: Data East
- Designer: Masateru Inagaki
- Artists: Masateru Inagaki; Misaki Tsukada; Yuzuru Tsukahara
- Composer: Hiroaki Yoshida
- Series: Magical Drop
- Platforms: Arcade, Super Famicom, Sega Saturn, PlayStation
- Release: June 1995: Arcade; JP: June 1995; NA: November 1995 Super Famicom; JP: October 20, 1995 Sega Saturn; JP: December 15, 1995 PlayStation; JP: January 13, 1996
- Genre: Puzzle
- Modes: Single-player, multiplayer
- Arcade system: Data East Simple 156

Magical Drop (Note: Japanese: マジカルドロップ, Hepburn: Majikaru Doroppu; known in North America as Chain Reaction) is a 1995 puzzle video game developed and released by Data East in Japanese arcades. It was later ported to Super Famicom, Sega Saturn, and PlayStation. It is the first entry in the Magical Drop series. In the game, the player takes control of one of six characters, battling against computer-controlled opponents before facing the goddess World in a final encounter. The objective is to clear the screen of constantly advancing colored 'drops' via a character placed at the bottom of the playfield, which can grab drops and make them disappear by putting them as a column of three or more drops of the same color. Two players can also participate in a competitive versus mode. It ran on the Data East Simple 156 hardware.

Data East wanted to make a puzzle game due to their casual nature and came across during their research with Moscow Nights (1993), a collection of puzzle games from Russia published by Black Legend for MS-DOS and among them they liked a title programmed by Russ called Drop-Drop (1992), which they found uninteresting to play but enjoyed its basic core mechanic and started thinking ways to make it more interesting. Data East chose Drop-Drop and signed a contract with Russ to produce their own version and the game's graphic designer led development in a direction that would appeal to female players, with the team creating a visual design that could fit its rules by using tarot cards as a motif, serving as basis for Magical Drop. The game proved popular among players due to its design and characters, but both the original arcade release and console versions garnered average reception from critics, some of which reviewed it as an import title. It was followed by Magical Drop II (1996).

== Gameplay ==
Arcade version screenshot

Magical Drop is a puzzle game where the player takes control of one of six characters named after a tarot card, battling against computer-controlled opponents before facing the goddess World in a final encounter. During gameplay, the objective is to clear the screen from a stack of constantly advancing colored 'drops' that descend from the top of the playfield.

Drops can be picked up and dropped by the player's character, which is placed at the bottom of the screen, and they disappear when three or more of the same color are put together on a single column. Chains are formed either when a single drop caused a chain reaction or when more than one group of drops are cleared in quick succession. Forming chains cause the opponent's stack to descend faster. Two players can also participate in a competitive versus mode (one may be a computer opponent). The game is over once a player is defeated when the stack of drops hits the bottom.

== Development ==
Magical Drop was developed by Data East, known for arcade games like Karnov, Bad Dudes Vs. Dragon Ninja, Atomic Runner Chelnov, and Windjammers. It was co-designed by a member under the pseudonym "Tac.H" and Masateru Inagaki, who also acted as one of the game's graphic designers along with Misaki Tsukada, while Yuzuru "Tsukapon!" Tsukahara served as character designer. The soundtrack was scored by Gamadelic member Hiroaki "Maro" Yoshida, known for his work in Data East titles such as Kūga – Operation Code Vapor Trail and Fighter's History. Other members within Data East also collaborated in the game's development. Former Data East staffers recounted the project's creation and history in interviews.

Screenshot of Drop-Drop, a puzzle game featured in Moscow Nights. It served as basis for Magical Drop.

The company wanted to make a puzzle game due to their casual pick-up-and-play nature. During their research, Data East came across with Moscow Nights (1993), a collection of puzzle games from Russia published by Black Legend for MS-DOS. Among the collection, they liked a game titled Drop-Drop (1992), programmed by the Russian company Russ. According to Takashi Kobayashi (then-development section manager at Data East), the game was "amateurish" and uninteresting to play, featuring blocks composed of random objects and lacking a combo system. However, Kobayashi enjoyed its basic core game mechanic and began thinking ways to make it more interesting.

Data East chose Drop-Drop and signed a contract with Russ to start production of their own version, serving as basis for Magical Drop. The game's graphic designer, who was forced into the planning role, led development in a direction that would appeal to female players and the team created a visual design that could fit its rules by using tarot cards as a motif. The project became a different title compared to the original game and Data East subsequently acquired the game's copyright from Russ.

== Release ==
Magical Drop was first released for arcades in Japan by Data East in June 1995, running on the Data East Simple 156 board. On November 17, an album containing music from the game and Dunk Dream '95 was co-published in Japan by Scitron and Pony Canyon, featuring arranged songs composed by Hiroaki Yoshida and other Gamadelic members. An updated version titled Magical Drop Plus 1! (Note: マジカルドロップPLUS1! (Majikaru Doroppu PLUS1!)) was also released in 1995, which adds a solo play mode that challenges players to obtain a high score without having to battle an opponent controlled by the computer. Magical Drop Plus 1! was released in North America by Data East on November of that year as Chain Reaction. This version replaces the character-specific voice acting with a male narrator, while the colored drops were changed into food items and stars.

The game was ported to various platforms including the Super Famicom and Sega Saturn in 1995, followed by a PlayStation version in 1996. The Super Famicom release includes a puzzle mode that challenges players to solve preset puzzles given a limited number of possible moves, while the 32-bit versions contain two new game modes but the original cast was re-imagined with different pre-rendered characters and the artwork was also altered. A trial version of the Super Famicom port was broadcast via Satellaview. Magical Drop Plus 1! also received a port for PlayStation as part of Magical Drop III + Wonderful, which was also released in PAL regions as simply Magical Drop III by Swing! Entertainment, retaining the Plus 1! name as opposed to using Chain Reaction. In 2002, the PlayStation port was re-released by Hamster Corporation as part of the "Major Wave Arcade Hits Series" budget label.

The Super Famicom port was re-released on the Japanese Virtual Console for Wii on May 29, 2007. That same year, the PlayStation version was also re-released for the Japanese PlayStation Store as part of the "Game Archives" line on December 26. The Super Famicom port was included along with other Data East titles on compilations released in Japan and worldwide by publisher Retro-Bit. Chain Reaction has since been re-released on the AntStream service and included as part of the Data East Arcade 1 compilation for Evercade.

== Reception ==
Reception

Review scores
Publication	Score
Famitsu	24/40 (SFC); 25/40 (SS); 25/40 (PS)
Mean Machines Sega	84/100 (SS)
Next Generation	(ARC)
Super Play	85% (SFC)
Total!	90/100 (SFC)
Sega Saturn Magazine (JP)	6.0/10 (SS)

In Japan, Game Machine magazine listed Magical Drop on their September 1, 1995 issue as being the tenth most-popular arcade game for the previous two weeks. Readers of the Japanese Sega Saturn Magazine voted to give the game a 6.4081 out of 10 score, ranking among Sega Saturn games at the number 734 spot in a 2000 public poll. According to the 2016 book, Perfect Guide of Nostalgic Super Famicom, the title succeeded in attracting female players due to its pop design and cute characters. However, both the original arcade release and the console conversions garnered average reception from critics, some of which reviewed it as an import title.

The Japanese Sega Saturn Magazine wrote that the need to line up objects only vertically leaves a feeling of dissatisfaction. They also unfavorably compared the character designs of the Saturn version with the hand-drawn animation of the Super Famicom version. Maximum magazine commented in regards to the Saturn release, stating that it offered a fair amount of entertainment despite its gameplay not offering "anything new or innovative". They ultimately felt that Baku Baku Animal was better. Famitsu's four reviewers found the PlayStation port, aside from its pre-rendered characters, similar content-wise to the Super Famicom port.

Mean Machines Sega's Marcus Hearn and Steve Merrett also reviewed the Saturn port, remarking that the game is addictive and offers numerous options but frustratingly difficult in single-player mode. Both Hearn and Merrett disagreed as to whether it is better or worse than Baku Baku Animal. Next Generation reviewed the original arcade version, writing: "Chain Reaction is proving quite popular in Japan, despite the fact that this kind of game has been around now for at least five years". They concluded that "it's not brilliant nor innovative, certainly not new, but it's fun and as addictive as sex after lunch... in a jester suit". Super Play's Andy Smith called the game very enjoyable and recommended the Super Famicom version to competitive players. Total!'s Sean Atkins also reviewed the Super Famicom port, praising its audiovisual presentation, gameplay, and longevity. expressing that it was better than Tetris Blast.

Reviewing the Plus 1! update in the PlayStation release of Magical Drop III, Mega Fun's Ralph Karels found it to be an entertaining title, citing its high addictive factor. Peter Willington of Pocket Gamer reviewed the PlayStation Network re-release on PSP, calling it "excellent" but was critical of the overall audiovisual presentation, and noted the lack of English translation and its difficulty. Hardcore Gamer's Chris Shive regarded the game and Magical Drop II as the most enjoyable titles in the Data East Classic Collection for Super Nintendo.

== Legacy ==
Magical Drop spawned several sequels and spin-offs (including Magical Drop II and Magical Drop III which both released for Neo Geo and co-published with SNK). The series' intellectual rights were bought and are currently owned by G-mode, along with several other franchises and titles by Data East. In 2007, an unofficial Amstrad CPC conversion developed by Oscar Sanchez was made available online for free. UTV Ignition Entertainment published a follow-up, Magical Drop V, developed by Golgoth Studio and released in 2012 for PC, featuring characters and their gameplay mechanics from the cancelled Neo Geo game Ghostlop. Another follow-up, Magical Drop VI, was announced to be in development by Highball Games and Storm Trident for Nintendo Switch in 2022 by publisher Forever Entertainment.
