= Ghostlop =

Cancelled video game

- Developer: Data East
- Publisher: Data East
- Producer: Koji Jinbo
- Designers: Tony Taka; Yuzuru Tsukahara
- Programmers: Kenichi Minegishi; Osapan; Sandy Hirokun
- Artists: Endo Chang; Kazuto Lee; Kenichi Maruyama
- Composers: Hiroaki Yoshida; Masaaki Iwasaki; Shinichi Yamazaki
- Platforms: Arcade; Neo Geo AES; Neo Geo CD
- Release: Unreleased
- Genre: Puzzle
- Modes: Single-player, multiplayer
- Arcade system: Neo Geo MVS

Ghostlop (Note: Japanese: ゴーストロップ, Hepburn: Gōsutoroppu) is an unreleased puzzle video game developed and published by Data East for the Neo Geo arcade and home platforms. In the game, players assume the role of ghosthunters Bruce and McCoy from the Data Ghost agency to evict mischievous ghosts across multiple locations. Its gameplay mainly consists of puzzle mixed with Breakout-style action elements using a main two-button configuration.

Headed by Nitro Ball director Koji Jinbo, Ghostlop was created by most of the same team that previously worked on several projects at Data East for the Neo Geo platforms and who would later go on to work at Kaneko on Cyvern: The Dragon Weapons before the former company declared bankruptcy in 2003. The game was first given a location test in 1996 and despite being previewed across few video game magazines, in addition of being showcased to attendees at trade shows, it was ultimately shelved by Data East for unknown reasons.

Despite Ghostlop never being officially released to the public, a ROM image of the complete game was leaked online by homebrew developer Neobitz, allowing for it to be played. As of 2009, the rights to the title are currently owned by G-Mode. Its characters and gameplay mechanics would later reappear in Magical Drop V.

== Gameplay ==
Gameplay screenshot from the released beta build

Ghostlop is a falling block puzzle game reminiscent of Drop Off and Puzzle Bobble, where players take control of ghost hunters Bruce (P1) and McCoy (P2) with the main objective of evicting as many ghosts as possible from the playfield with a single ball by using the walls and/or their respective character to ricochet the ball back at the ghosts to eliminate them before the timer runs out and the current round ends. Failing in catching the ball from rebound after touching the floor results in a stack of random colored ghosts rapidly descending from the top and once all the ghosts reach the bottom, the game is over as a result unless players insert more credits into the arcade machine to continue playing. The game offers a single-player campaign mode where one player assume the role of either Bruce or McCoy to hunt and evict mischievous ghosts across multiple locations, as well as a versus mode where players compete for the highest score.

A unique feature of the game is how ghosts are evicted. Similar to Silhouette Mirage and Ikaruga's polarity mechanism, players can switch their ball between red and blue colors in order to evict ghosts of the same respective color by pressing either A or B buttons. There are also three additional types of ghosts: bomb ghosts capable of detaching others caught within their blast radius, skull ghosts that take two hits to evict as well as electric ghosts, which act as dynamite that erases all the ghosts from the playfield. Similar to Puyo Puyo's chain mechanism, players are able to attack the rival playfield by performing a chain reaction with a disappearing ghost that cause a group of ghosts to fall off and spawn in the rival area.

== Development ==
Ghostlop was created by most of the same team that previously worked on several projects at Data East for the Neo Geo platforms such as Spinmaster, Windjammers, Karnov's Revenge, Street Slam and the Magical Drop franchise, after which a group of employees would later go on to work at Kaneko on Cyvern: The Dragon Weapons before the former company declared bankruptcy in 2003. Its development was helmed by Nitro Ball director Koji Jinbo as producer, with Yuzuru Tsukahara serving as the project's sole designer. Programmers Kenichi Minegishi, Osapan, Sandy Hirokun and Sho Chang wrote the game's software. Endo Chang and several artists were in charge of creating the pixel art, while Tony Taka acted as character designer. The sound was handled by Gamadelic members Hiroaki Yoshida, Masaaki Iwasaki and Shinichi Yamazaki, while character voice work was done by Lynn Harris and Ward Sexton, the latter of which is credited erroneously as Word E. Sexton.

== History ==
Ghostlop was first showcased by SNK (who planned to release the game outside Japan) to the public at trade shows such as the Amusement & Music Operators Association Show (AMOA) and Amusement Machine Show, in addition of being playable during location tests in 1996, where it was reportedly met with a less than enthusiastic response from players. The game was also previewed on Electronic Gaming Monthly and Neo Geo Freak. SNK briefly considered re-releasing the title in 2001 but the idea was scrapped and was ultimately shelved for unknown reasons, leading Data East in notifying Japanese audiences about the cancelled launch via email, but several possible factors have been given as to why it was never published. In January 2002, emulated screenshots from a prototype cartridge surfaced online, indicating that the ROM image of the game was preserved but not made widely available to public.

=== Release ===
In February 2003, a MVS prototype cartridge of Ghostlop was acquired by video game collector Billy Pitt from an Ohio-based arcade operator, who received it via SNK. Although its production number during development remained unknown and was generally believed to be assigned with the number 128, it was later revealed to be officially assigned with the number 228 instead on April of the same year. Around the same time period, a ROM image of the complete game was leaked online by homebrew developer Neobitz.

=== Legacy ===
After Data East declared bankruptcy in 2003, the rights to Ghostlop were acquired and are currently owned by G-Mode as of 2009. Although its release was cancelled, the characters later reappeared in Magical Drop V, using gameplay from the former title instead of traditional Magical Drop mechanics.
