= Magical Drop II =

1996 video game

- Developer: Data East
- Publishers: JP: Data East; NA: SNK (ARC); Sega (SS)
- Designer: Shungo Katagiri
- Artists: Asami Kaneko; Hiroshi Hachiya; Mayu Sato
- Composers: Hiroaki Yoshida; Masaaki Iwasaki; Shogo Sakai
- Series: Magical Drop
- Platforms: Arcade, Neo Geo AES, Neo Geo CD, Super Famicom, Sega Saturn
- Release: March 21, 1996: Arcade; JP: March 21, 1996; NA: May 1996 Neo Geo AES; JP: April 19, 1996 Neo Geo CD; JP: May 24, 1996 Super Famicom; JP: September 20, 1996 Saturn; JP: September 27, 1996
- Genre: Puzzle
- Modes: Single-player, multiplayer
- Arcade system: Neo Geo MVS

Magical Drop II (Note: Japanese: マジカルドロップ 2, Hepburn: Majikaru Doroppu 2) (sometimes known as Magical Drop 2) is a 1996 puzzle video game developed and published by Data East for the Neo Geo arcade and home platforms. It was later ported to Neo Geo CD, Super Famicom, and Sega Saturn. It is the second entry in the Magical Drop series. In the game, the player takes control of one of several characters, battling against computer-controlled opponents before facing the villainous Empress in a final encounter. Gameplay is similar to its predecessor Magical Drop (1995), albeit with improvements; the objective is to clear the screen of constantly advancing colored 'drops' via a character placed at the bottom of the playfield, which can grab drops and make them disappear by putting them as a column of three or more drops of the same color. Two players can also participate in a competitive versus mode.

Prior to Magical Drop II, Data East had previously developed a number of Neo Geo titles such as titles such as Spinmaster, Windjammers, Street Slam, and Karnov's Revenge. Iwao Horita and Naomi Susa acted as co-supervisors, with Shungo Katagiri serving as the game's sole planner, while the soundtrack was scored by Gamadelic. The game proved popular among players but both the original arcade release and console versions garnered average reception from critics, some of which reviewed it as an import title. The title has since been re-released on compilations and through download services for various consoles. It was followed by Magical Drop III (1997).

== Gameplay ==
Gameplay screenshot showcasing a match between Chariot and Star

Like its predecessor, Magical Drop II is a puzzle game where the player takes control of one of several characters named after a tarot card, battling against computer-controlled opponents before facing the villainous Empress in a final encounter. Gameplay is similar to the first entry albeit with improvements; the objective is to clear the screen from a stack of constantly advancing colored 'drops' that descend from the top of the playfield. Drops can be picked up and dropped by the player's character, which is placed at the bottom of the screen, and they disappear when three or more of the same color are put together on a single column. Chains are formed either when a single drop caused a chain reaction or when more than one group of drops are cleared in quick succession. Forming chains cause the opponent's stack to descend faster.

One notable gameplay change is that normal drops and "special" drops can now be matched together, unlike the first game where they were considered completely separate. The single-player mode, now known as "Puzzle" mode, was also changed to add more rows to the player's playfield. New to the series are rainbow pieces, which can become special drops when they are incorporated into the playfield. The Japanese version contains a third mode named "Hirameki" that offers preset puzzles for the player to solve. The difficulty levels now correspond to a chosen character as well. Two players can also participate in a competitive versus mode (one may be a computer opponent). The game is over once a player is defeated when the stack of drops hits the bottom.

== Development and release ==
Magical Drop II was developed by Data East, which had previously created a number of Neo Geo titles such as Spinmaster, Windjammers, Street Slam, and Karnov's Revenge, with Iwao Horita and Naomi Susa acting as co-supervisors. Shungo Katagiri and a staffer under the pseudonym "Tac.H" served as the game's sole planner and programmer respectively. Asami "Asamin" Kaneko, Hiroshi Hachiya, Mayu Sato, Rie Sakurai, and Shōji Takeuchi were responsible for the artwork. The soundtrack was scored by Gamadelic members Hiroaki "Maro" Yoshida, Masaaki "Koremasa" Iwasaki, and Shogo Sakai.

Magical Drop II was first released for the Neo Geo arcade system (MVS) in Japan by Data East on March 21, 1996, and later in North America by SNK in May. There are differences between the original Japanese release and English localization, such as the removal of "Flash" game mode and "Expert" difficulty in single-player mode, as well as voice acting. The game was then published in Japan for the Neo Geo home system (AES) on April 19, and later for Neo Geo CD on May 24. On June 21, an album containing music from the game was co-published in Japan by Scitron and Pony Canyon. It was ported to the Super Famicom and Sega Saturn. The Super Famicom and Saturn versions add short conversations between the characters in cutscenes, while the Super Famicom version also allows players to adjust the characters' parameters, among other differences.

Magical Drop II was first re-released on the Wii's Virtual Console on May 25, 2010, in Japan, then in North America on November 29, and later in Europe on December 3. In 2017, the Super Famicom port was included along with other Data East titles on compilations released in Japan and worldwide by publisher Retro-Bit, featuring an English translation by the group Aeon Genesis. Hamster Corporation re-released the game as part of their ACA Neo Geo series for the PlayStation 4, Xbox One, Nintendo Switch, Windows, Android and iOS. This re-release includes additional scoring modes, screen filter options, and difficulty settings. It was also later released for PC on May 25, 2018. An unreleased English localization of the Super Famicom version was added to the Nintendo Classics service in 2021.

== Reception ==
Reception

Review scores
| Publication | Score |
|---|---|
| AllGame | (NG) |
| Famitsu | 25/40 (SS) |
| M! Games | 70% (NG) |
| Next Generation | (NG) |
| Saturn Fan | 7.3/10 (SS) |
| Sega Saturn Magazine (JP) | 5.66/10 (SS) |

In Japan, Game Machine magazine listed Magical Drop II as the fifth most popular arcade game for the last two weeks of April 1996. Japanese publication Micom BASIC Magazine ranked the Neo Geo version seventh in popularity in its July 1996 issue. Readers of the Japanese Sega Saturn Magazine voted to give the game a 8.1735 out of 10 score, ranking among Sega Saturn games at the number 339 spot in a 2000 public poll. Both the original arcade release and the console conversions garnered average reception from critics, some of which reviewed it as an import title.

Reviewing the Neo Geo AES version, MAN!AC's Andreas Knauf wrote that it was an ordinary puzzle game in the vein of Columns, finding its concept simple but mature. Next Generation also reviewed the Neo Geo AES version, saying that it becomes monotonous after a while but is overall solid and reasonably addictive. They found the game's most distinctive quality was its accelerated pace, remarking that "you don't have to be as precise as [in] some puzzle games, but there is no time to think, just time to do". Saturn Fan's two critics reviewed the Saturn version, finding it to be more of an action title than a puzzle one, citing its fast-pacing and difficult but addictive approach. AllGame's Kyle Knight reviewed the Neo Geo AES release as well, giving positive remarks to the cheerful visuals, audio, and frantic but strategic gameplay.

=== Retrospective coverage ===
Retrospective commentary for Magical Drop II has been mostly favorable. Reviewing the re-release on the Wii's Virtual Console, Nintendo Life's Corbie Dillard wrote that "Magical Drop II might not be the most original puzzler idea ever crafted, but it is certainly one of the most intense." Dillard commended its addictive gameplay design and colorful presentation, but found the lack of music variety to be an issue. IGN's Lucas M. Thomas also reviewed the Virtual Console re-release and felt that the home version "betrays its arcade origins", citing the minimal presentation, very few options, and difficulty. Nevertheless, Thomas highlighted its head-to-head multiplayer. MAN!AC's Thomas Nickel reviewed the Virtual Console re-release as well and regarded it as a fun puzzle game, noting the characters' cute design and animations, and two-player mode.

Analysing the Arcade Archives re-release on Nintendo Switch, Morgan Sleeper of Nintendo Life lauded the inclusion of both Japanese and International versions, as well as the additional modes and online rankings, stating that "Magical Drop II is a fantastic, fast-paced puzzle game that feels right at home on the Switch, and an easy recommendation for any puzzle game fan." Hardcore Gamer's Chris Shive regarded the game and the original Magical Drop as the most enjoyable titles in the Data East Classic Collection for Super Nintendo. Writing for Nintendo Life, Kurt Kalata reviewed the previously unreleased Super Nintendo localization on the Nintendo Classics service, regarding it to be an "excellent" conversion of the Neo Geo original but felt that it is made redundant by the follow-up Magical Drop III.
