= Magical Drop F: Daibōken Mo Rakujyanai! =

1999 video game

- Developers: Data East, Sakata SAS
- Publisher: Data East
- Director: Masayuki Yoroki
- Producer: Hiromichi Nakamoto
- Designer: Tatsumi Sugiura
- Programmers: Keiichi Hinata; Motohiro Umeki; Tsuyoshi Takahashi
- Composers: Hiroaki Yoshida; Masaaki Iwasaki; Tatsuya Kiuchi; Yoko Kawashima
- Series: Magical Drop
- Platform: PlayStation
- Release: JP: October 21, 1999
- Genres: Puzzle, role-playing
- Modes: Single-player, multiplayer

Magical Drop F: Daibōken Mo Rakujyanai! (Note: Japanese: マジカルドロップF・大冒険もラクじゃない!, Hepburn: Majikaru Doroppu F: Daibōken Mo Rakujyanai!; lit "Magical Drop F: The Great Adventure is Not Easy!") is a 1999 puzzle video game by Data East for the PlayStation. It is the fourth entry in the Magical Drop series. In the game, the player takes control of one of several characters and battle against opponents. Gameplay is similar to previous entries but with the addition of a role-playing (RPG) mode; the player controls Justice on a journey to find seven Magical Drops scattered across the land, traveling villages and challenging characters in battles to obtain items and power-ups.

The game was directed by Masayuki Yoroki and produced by Hiromichi Nakamoto, with Tatsumi Sugiura acting as planner. Daibōken Mo Rakujyanai! garnered generally favorable reception from critics, most of which reviewed it as an import title. Its music and updated aesthetics were later used in Magical Drop for WonderSwan (1999), released for the WonderSwan. It was followed by Magical Drop V (2012).

== Gameplay ==
Gameplay screenshot.

Magical Drop F: Daibōken Mo Rakujyanai! is a puzzle game where the player takes control of one of several characters named after a tarot card, battling against computer-controlled opponents. Gameplay is similar to previous entries in the Magical Drop series; the objective is to clear the screen from a stack of constantly advancing colored 'drops' that descend from the top of the playfield. Drops can be picked up and dropped by the player's character, which is placed at the bottom of the screen, and they disappear when three or more of the same color are put together on a single column. Chains are formed either when a single drop caused a chain reaction or when more than one group of drops are cleared in quick succession. Forming chains cause the opponent's stack to descend faster.

One notable addition is the introduction of character-specific special power-up items, of which there are three that gives the players unique abilities during gameplay. The game replaces adventure mode from Magical Drop III with a role-playing (RPG) mode; the player controls Justice on a journey to find seven Magical Drops scattered across the land, traveling villages and challenging characters in battles to obtain items and power-ups. The game is over once a player is defeated when the stack of drops hits the bottom.

== Development and release ==
Magical Drop F: Daibōken Mo Rakujyanai! was directed by Masayuki Yoroki and produced by Hiromichi Nakamoto. Tatsumi Sugiura served as planner, while Keiichi Hinata, Motohiro Umeki, and Tsuyoshi Takahashi acted as co-programmers. Character designs were handled by an artist known under the pseudonym "Cocco" while several companies, including Japanese animation studio J.C.Staff, collaborated on the game's development by providing artwork and cutscenes. The soundtrack was scored by Gamadelic members Hiroaki "Maro" Yoshida, Masaaki "Koremasa" Iwasaki, Tatsuya "-K-" Kiuchi, and Yoko Kawashima. Magical Drop F: Daibōken Mo Rakujyanai! was co-developed by Sakata SAS, a video game subsidiary of Japanese software developer SAS established in 1985, which had previously worked for Data East on a number of projects across multiple platforms such as the Tantei Jingūji Saburō series.

Magical Drop F: Daibōken Mo Rakujyanai! was released for the PlayStation in Japan by Data East on October 21, 1999. On April 26, 2001, Daibōken Mo Rakujyanai! was re-released by Hamster Corporation as part of their "Major Wave" series of budget titles. In 2008, the game was re-released on PlayStation Network in Japan. In 2010, the title was rated by the ESRB, implying a future international re-rerelease. That same year, the game was distributed via PlayStation Network in North America by MonkeyPaw Games on October 5.

== Reception ==
Reception

Review scores
Publication	Score
Destructoid	8.5/10 (PSN)
GameSpot	7.5/10
PlayStation Illustrated	76% (PSN)
PlayStation LifeStyle	8/10 (PSN)

Magical Drop F: Daibōken Mo Rakujyanai! garnered generally favorable reception from critics, most of which reviewed it as an import title. GameSpot's Christian Nutt commented that the gameplay was simpler but less frantic compared to Magical Drop III, noting the removal of special drops. Nutt also found the RPG-style adventure mode very original for a puzzle game, praising the detailed and rich visuals in this mode, but criticized its short length and inability to save progress. PlayStation LifeStyle's Corey Schwanz reviewed the PlayStation Network re-release, highlighting its addictive puzzle mechanics and "beautiful" artstyle. Although the language barrier in the role-playing single-player mode was seen as a negative aspect, Schwanz wrote that "Magical Drop F is proof-positive that even if you can't read anything in the game's language, it can still be a blast to play."

Destructoid's Dale North concurred with Schwanz regarding the language barrier in the role-playing adventure mode, while noting the revamped gameplay and more serious artstyle for characters. North summarized his review of the PSN re-release by stating "It's not near as fancy or complex as the fantastic and flash animated opening movie would lead you to believe, but it is cute and worth checking out." PlayStation Illustrated's Matt Paddock also analyzed the PSN re-release, commending the audiovisual presentation and its simple but humorous gameplay, but ultimately felt mixed about the difficulty curve and mechanics.
