= G-Mode Archives =

- Genre: Various
- Publisher: G-Mode
- Platforms: Nintendo Switch, Windows
- First release: April 16, 2020

G-Mode Archives is a series of re-releases of older mobile games for the Nintendo Switch console as well as Windows PCs on Steam. The term "G-Mode Archives" on its own refers to titles that are developed or published by G-Mode, whereas G-Mode Archives+ refers to third-party releases. The series debuted on the Switch on April 16, 2020, and first appeared on Windows on April 21, 2021.

The games released as part of the G-Mode Archives series are Java-based games. They were originally developed with J2ME, BREW, or in DoJa for Japanese feature phones. The games in the latter category were originally released for the service i-mode, which required a monthly fee to be paid in order to play. They cover a wide variety of genres such as JRPGs, puzzle games, simulation games, and sports titles.

== List of G-Mode Archives releases ==
The following is the list of G-Mode Archives titles.

Currently, 60 games are available:

Titles in the G-Mode Archives series
	Title	Developer	Original release	G-Mode Archives Release date			G-Mode Archives Platforms	
#	Title	Developer	Original release	JP	NA	PAL	NS	PC
1	Flyhight Cloudia	G-Mode	2004	April 16, 2020 ^{NS} April 21, 2021 ^{PC}	Unreleased	Unreleased	Yes	Yes
2	Ai to Roudou no Hibi	G-Mode; Mobile & Game Studio	2005	April 23, 2020 ^{NS}	Unreleased	Unreleased	Yes	No
3	Kururin Cafe	G-Mode	2010	April 30, 2020 ^{NS}	Unreleased	Unreleased	Yes	No
4	Beach Volleyball Shizuku	Mobile & Game Studio	2007	May 7, 2020 ^{NS}	Unreleased	Unreleased	Yes	No
5	Sukeboooman	G-Mode	2006	June 4, 2020 ^{NS}	Unreleased	Unreleased	Yes	No
6	Shijou Saikyou Miyamoto Julia	Magical Company	2008	June 25, 2020 ^{NS}	Unreleased	Unreleased	Yes	No
7	Love Love Knuckle	Mobile & Game Studio	2006	July 2, 2020 ^{NS}	Unreleased	Unreleased	Yes	No
8	Pucchin Puzzle	Mobile & Game Studio	2010	July 16, 2020 ^{NS}	Unreleased	Unreleased	Yes	No
9	Flyhight Cloudia II	G-Mode	2004	July 30, 2020 ^{NS} May 24, 2021 ^{PC}	Unreleased	Unreleased	Yes	Yes
10	Omohide Series Omatsuri Dukushi	Seekz	2009	August 6, 2020 ^{NS}	Unreleased	Unreleased	Yes	No
11	Senbazuru	Seekz	2006	August 6, 2020 ^{NS}	Unreleased	Unreleased	Yes	No
12	Night Hike	Seekz	2007	August 20, 2020 ^{NS}	Unreleased	Unreleased	Yes	No
13	Rinji Shuuden	Seekz	2011	August 27, 2020 ^{NS}	Unreleased	Unreleased	Yes	No
14	Mystia	Game Studio	2002	September 3, 2020 ^{NS}	Unreleased	Unreleased	Yes	No
15	Churashima Kurashi	Seekz	2009	September 10, 2020 ^{NS} August 9, 2021 ^{PC}	Unreleased	Unreleased	Yes	Yes
16	Beach Volleyball Shizuku 2: Hishou Hen	Mobile & Game Studio	2008	September 17, 2020 ^{NS}	Unreleased	Unreleased	Yes	No
17	Flyhight Cloudia III	G-Mode	2007	September 24, 2020 ^{NS} June 28, 2021 ^{PC}	Unreleased	Unreleased	Yes	Yes
18	Hero Must Die	Pyramid	2007	October 1, 2020 ^{NS}	Unreleased	Unreleased	Yes	No
19	Magical Drop DX	Matrix Software	2004	October 8, 2020 ^{NS} August 23, 2021 ^{PC}	Unreleased	Unreleased	Yes	Yes
20	Magical Fantasia	Matrix Software	2004	October 15, 2020 ^{NS} August 3, 2021 ^{PC}	Unreleased	Unreleased	Yes	No
21	Ueno Paradise	Matrix Software	2003	October 22, 2020 ^{NS}	Unreleased	Unreleased	Yes	No
22	Hercules no Eikou III: Kamigami no Chinmoku	Data East	2008	October 29, 2020 ^{NS}	Unreleased	Unreleased	Yes	No
23	Keitai Shoujo	Seekz	2005	November 19, 2020 ^{NS}	Unreleased	Unreleased	Yes	No
24	Sangokushi Nendaiki DX	Mobile & Game Studio	2005	December 3, 2020 ^{NS}	Unreleased	Unreleased	Yes	No
25	Topolon	G-Mode	2002	December 10, 2020 ^{NS}	January 14, 2021 ^{NS}	January 14, 2021 ^{NS}	Yes	No
26	Ore no Sentai Oranger	Matrix Software	2005	December 24, 2020 ^{NS}	Unreleased	Unreleased	Yes	No
27	Ninja Gakko	G-Mode	2007	January 14, 2021 ^{NS}	Unreleased	Unreleased	Yes	No
28	Sepas Channel	Seekz	2008	January 21, 2021 ^{NS} July 26, 2021 ^{PC}	Unreleased	Unreleased	Yes	Yes
29	Zanac	Compile	2005	January 28, 2021 ^{NS}	January 28, 2021 ^{NS}	January 28, 2021 ^{NS}	Yes	No
30	Sorcerian	Mobile & Game Studio	2007	February 18, 2021 ^{NS}	Unreleased	Unreleased	Yes	No
31	Irekae IQ Crossword DX	G-Mode	2009	February 25, 2021 ^{NS}	Unreleased	Unreleased	Yes	No
32	Maou Company	G-Mode	2006	March 4, 2021 ^{NS}	Unreleased	Unreleased	Yes	No
33	Tetris Diamond	G-Mode	2007	April 1, 2021 ^{NS}	Unreleased	Unreleased	Yes	No
34	Majoukko Princess	G-Mode	2007	April 15, 2021 ^{NS}	Unreleased	Unreleased	Yes	No
35	Magical Fantasista II	Matrix Software	2005	July 1, 2021 ^{NS}	Unreleased	Unreleased	Yes	No
36	Beach Volley Girl Shizuku 3: Sekai Taikai-hen	Mobile & Game Studio	2009	July 21, 2021 ^{NS}	Unreleased	Unreleased	Yes	No
37	Moe Slot ☆ Beach no Shizuku	Mobile & Game Studio	2009	July 21, 2021 ^{NS}	Unreleased	Unreleased	Yes	No
38	Mystia 2	Mobile & Game Studio	2005	September 16, 2021 ^{NS}	Unreleased	Unreleased	Yes	No
39	Flyhight Cloudia IV: Eien no Kizuna	G-Mode	2009	September 23, 2021 ^{PC} September 23, 2021 ^{NS}	Unreleased	Unreleased	Yes	Yes
40	Kamura: Kamigami to Chigiri Shisha	G-Mode	2009	January 13, 2022 ^{NS}	Unreleased	Unreleased	Yes	No
41	Izumi Jiken File Vol. 1: Shiosai-hen	G-Mode	2002	February 3, 2022 ^{NS}	Unreleased	Unreleased	Yes	No
42	Izumi Jiken File Vol. 2: Tasogare-hen	G-Mode	2003	May 26, 2022 ^{NS}	Unreleased	Unreleased	Yes	No
43	Izumi Jiken File Vol. 3: Yuyado	G-Mode	2004	October 13, 2022 ^{NS}	Unreleased	Unreleased	Yes	No
44	Dragon x Dragon: Complete Version	Seekz	2003	March 8, 2023 ^{NS}	Unreleased	Unreleased	Yes	No
45	Churaumi Monogatari	G-Mode	2011	March 16, 2023 ^{NS}	Unreleased	Unreleased	Yes	No
46	Kētai Shōjo: Koi + Hime - Koi ni Ochita Shinderera Hime	Seekz	2008	March 23, 2023 ^{NS}	Unreleased	Unreleased	Yes	No
47	12GEMs	Seekz	2005	April 6, 2023 ^{NS}	Unreleased	Unreleased	Yes	No
48	Dragon x Dragon 2	Seekz	2003	July 13, 2023 ^{NS}	Unreleased	Unreleased	Yes	No
49	Gregory Horror Show	Seekz	2004	October 26, 2023 ^{NS}	Unreleased	Unreleased	Yes	Yes
50	Midnight Horror School	Seekz	2005	October 26, 2023 ^{NS}	Unreleased	Unreleased	Yes	Yes
51	Trio the Punch	G-Mode	2006	November 22, 2023 ^{NS}	Unreleased	Unreleased	Yes	No
52	BurgerTime	G-Mode	2006	November 29, 2023 ^{NS}	Unreleased	Unreleased	Yes	No
53	Daienkai Bucho	G-Mode	2010	December 7, 2023 ^{NS}	Unreleased	Unreleased	Yes	No
54	Magical Fantasista 3	Matrix Software	2007	February 20, 2025 ^{NS}	Unreleased	Unreleased	Yes	No
55	Side Pocket	G-Mode	2005	May 8, 2025 ^{NS}	Unreleased	Unreleased	Yes	No
56	Mystia 3	Mobile & Game Studio	2006	June 5, 2025 ^{NS}	Unreleased	Unreleased	Yes	No
57	Pyonpyon Athletics (includes Vol.1, Vol.2, and Expert versions)	G-Mode	2001	July 3, 2025 ^{NS}	Unreleased	Unreleased	Yes	No
58	Geki-dan Musume Akane & Aoi	G-Mode	2009	October 16, 2025 ^{NS}	Unreleased	Unreleased	Yes	No
59	Kira☆Kira	G-Mode	2004	November 6, 2025 ^{NS}	Unreleased	Unreleased	Yes	No
60	Tōkyō Maboroshi Kitan: Shi ni Aisa Reta Shōnen	G-Mode	2008	December 23, 2025 ^{NS}	Unreleased	Unreleased	Yes	No

== List of G-Mode Archives+ releases ==
The following is the list of G-Mode Archives+ titles.

Currently, 80 games are available:

Titles in the G-Mode Archives+ series
Title	Developer	Original release	G-Mode Archives+ Release date			G-Mode Archives+ Platforms	
Title	Developer	Original release	JP	NA	PAL	NS	PC
Tantei Kibukawa Ryousuke Jiken-tan Vol. 1: Kamen Gensou Satsujin Jiken	Genki	2002	March 18, 2021 ^{NS} March 9, 2023 ^{PC}	Unreleased	Unreleased	Yes	Yes
Tantei Kibukawa Ryousuke Jiken-tan Vol. 2: Kairoukan Satsujin Jiken	Genki	2003	April 8, 2021 ^{NS} March 9, 2023 ^{PC}	Unreleased	Unreleased	Yes	Yes
City Connection Rocket	Studio Runba	2004	April 28, 2021 ^{NS}	Unreleased	Unreleased	Yes	Yes
Tantei Kibukawa Ryousuke Jiken-tan Vol. 3: Shisha no Rakuen	Genki	2003	May 6, 2021 ^{NS} March 9, 2023 ^{PC}	Unreleased	Unreleased	Yes	Yes
DoDonPachi DaiOuJou DX	Cave	2005	May 20, 2021 ^{NS} November 15, 2021 ^{PC}	Unreleased	Unreleased	Yes	Yes
Maou ga Ochiruhi	Jaleco	2005	May 27, 2021 ^{NS}	Unreleased	Unreleased	Yes	No
Burari Sekai Untei	ONEUPGAMES	2008	June 3, 2021 ^{NS}	Unreleased	Unreleased	Yes	No
Ninja Jajamaru-kun: Ranbu	Jaleco	2003	June 17, 2021 ^{NS}	Unreleased	Unreleased	Yes	No
Tantei Kibukawa Ryousuke Jiken-tan Vol. 4: Shirasagi ni Aka no Hane	Genki	2004	June 24, 2021 ^{NS} March 9, 2023 ^{PC}	Unreleased	Unreleased	Yes	Yes
Danmaku Kentei Shiken DaiOuJou-hen	Cave	2005	July 8, 2021 ^{NS} January 19, 2022 ^{PC}	Unreleased	Unreleased	Yes	Yes
Tantei Kibukawa Ryousuke Jiken-tan Vol. 5: Kurai Hako no Ue	Genki	2004	July 29, 2021 ^{NS} March 9, 2023 ^{PC}	Unreleased	Unreleased	Yes	Yes
Ketsui: Kizuna Jigoku-tachi DX	Cave	2004	August 5, 2021 ^{NS}	Unreleased	Unreleased	Yes	No
Tantei Kibukawa Ryousuke Jiken-tan Vol. 6: Tsuikou Saku Jiken	Genki	2004	August 11, 2021 ^{NS} March 9, 2023 ^{PC}	Unreleased	Unreleased	Yes	Yes
Tondemo Nishibuuki 2: Paris Butal Rally	ONEUPGAMES	2004	August 19, 2021 ^{NS}	Unreleased	Unreleased	Yes	No
Danmaku Kentei Shiken Ketsui-hen	Cave	2006	September 30, 2021 ^{NS}	Unreleased	Unreleased	Yes	No
Tantei Kibukawa Ryousuke Jiken-tan Vol. 7: Otonari Keiji no Sousa Memo	Genki	2004	October 7, 2021 ^{NS} March 9, 2023 ^{PC}	Unreleased	Unreleased	Yes	Yes
Momoko 1200%	Jaleco	2006	October 21, 2021 ^{NS}	Unreleased	Unreleased	Yes	No
Tantei Kibukawa Ryousuke Jiken-tan Vol. 8: Kamen Gen-ei Satsujin Jiken	Genki	2005	November 4, 2021 ^{NS} March 9, 2023 ^{PC}	Unreleased	Unreleased	Yes	Yes
Idol Janshi Suchie-Pai: Milky no Yabou	Jaleco	2006	December 23, 2021 ^{NS}	Unreleased	Unreleased	Yes	No
Tantei Kibukawa Ryousuke Jiken-tan Vol. 9: Samidare wa Nibiiro no Shirabe	Genki	2005	December 24, 2021 ^{NS} March 9, 2023 ^{PC}	Unreleased	Unreleased	Yes	Yes
Mikuni Field Combat	Jaleco	2007	March 17, 2022 ^{NS}	Unreleased	Unreleased	Yes	No
Tantei Kibukawa Ryousuke Jiken-tan Vol. 10: Eigou-kai Jiken	Genki	2006	April 28, 2021 ^{NS} March 9, 2023 ^{PC}	Unreleased	Unreleased	Yes	Yes
Megami Tensei Gaiden: Shinyaku Last Bible	BBMF	2008	July 14, 2022 ^{NS} December 13, 2022 ^{PC}	Unreleased	Unreleased	Yes	Yes
Megami Tensei Gaiden: Shinyaku Last Bible II: Hajimari no Fukuin	BBMF	2009	September 29, 2022 ^{NS} December 13, 2022 ^{PC}	Unreleased	Unreleased	Yes	Yes
Megami Tensei Gaiden: Shinyaku Last Bible III: Mugen no Eiyuu	Menue	2010	November 24, 2022 ^{NS} December 13, 2022 ^{PC}	Unreleased	Unreleased	Yes	Yes
Tantei Kibukawa Ryousuke Jiken-tan Vol. 11: Ane no Kabe	Genki	2007	April 16, 2023 ^{NS} May 9, 2023 ^{PC}	Unreleased	Unreleased	Yes	Yes
Psycho Mystery Series Vol. 1: Three - Mitsu no Kioku	Genki	2005	May 11, 2023 ^{NS}	Unreleased	Unreleased	Yes	No
Tōdō Ryūnosuke Tantei Nikki Vol. 1: Kohakuiro no Yuigon	Althi	2003	May 18, 2023 ^{NS}	Unreleased	Unreleased	Yes	No
Tantei Kibukawa Ryōsuke Jikentan Vol. 12: Nakanai Irainin	Genki	2007	June 1, 2023 ^{NS, PC} March 9, 2023 ^{PC}	Unreleased	Unreleased	Yes	Yes
Game Tengoku: The Game Paradise!	Jaleco	2007	June 15, 2023 ^{NS}	Unreleased	Unreleased	Yes	No
Psycho Mystery Series Vol. 2: Angel Cry	Genki	2005	June 22, 2023 ^{NS}	Unreleased	Unreleased	Yes	No
Idol Janshi Suchie-Pai	Jaleco	2004	July 6, 2023 ^{NS}	Unreleased	Unreleased	Yes	No
Psycho Mystery Series Vol. 3: Sin - Tsumi	Genki	2005	July 27, 2023 ^{NS}	Unreleased	Unreleased	Yes	No
Moero!! Pro Yakyū	Jaleco	2005	August 3, 2023 ^{NS}	Unreleased	Unreleased	Yes	No
Tōdō Ryūnosuke Tantei Nikki Vol. 2: Ōgon no Rashinban	Althi	2005	August 18, 2023 ^{NS}	Unreleased	Unreleased	Yes	No
Momoko no Kasei Bowling: La Mars Cup	Jaleco	2006	September 7, 2023 ^{NS}	Unreleased	Unreleased	Yes	No
Megami Ibunroku Persona: Ikū no Tō-hen	Brizo Interactive	2006	September 14, 2023 ^{NS} September 29, 2023 ^{PC}	Unreleased	Unreleased	Yes	Yes
Psycho Mystery Series Vol. 4: Innocent Noise	Genki	2005	September 28, 2023 ^{NS}	Unreleased	Unreleased	Yes	No
Tōdō Ryūnosuke Tantei Nikki Vol. 3: Ruri-iro no Suiren: Gosairyū Densetsu Renzoku Satsujin Jiken	Althi	2005	October 5, 2023 ^{NS}	Unreleased	Unreleased	Yes	No
Psycho Mystery Series Vol. 5: Cold Rain	Genki	2005	November 2, 2023 ^{NS}	Unreleased	Unreleased	Yes	No
Majin Tensei: Blind Thinker	BBMF	2007	November 16, 2023 ^{NS, PC}	Unreleased	Unreleased	Yes	Yes
Tantei Kibukawa Ryōsuke Jikentan Vol. 13: Tasogare wa Ruri no Tsuioku	Genki	2009	December 21, 2023 ^{NS, PC}	Unreleased	Unreleased	Yes	Yes
Tōdō Ryūnosuke Tantei Nikki Vol. 4: Aen no Kōfune - Sōma-tei Renzoku Satsujin Jiken	Althi	2005	January 18, 2024 ^{NS}	Unreleased	Unreleased	Yes	No
Jaleco Super Tennis ~ Heroine's Cup ~	Jaleco	2007	January 25, 2024 ^{NS}	Unreleased	Unreleased	Yes	No
Psycho Mystery Series Vol. 6: Bloody Tears	Genki	2006	February 8, 2024 ^{NS}	Unreleased	Unreleased	Yes	No
Tantei Kibukawa Ryōsuke Jikentan Vol. 14: Rasen no Hitsugi Satsujin Kiken	Genki	2010	March 7, 2024 ^{NS, PC}	Unreleased	Unreleased	Yes	Yes
Aegis: The First Mission	Atlus & BBMF	2007	June 6, 2024 ^{NS, PC}	Unreleased	Unreleased	Yes	Yes
Kawa no Nushi Tsuri 2	Marvelous	2009	July 4, 2024 ^{NS}	Unreleased	Unreleased	Yes	No
Argus DX	Jaleco	2003	July 18, 2024 ^{NS}	Unreleased	Unreleased	Yes	No
Tantei Kibukawa Ryōsuke Jikentan Vol. 15: Oumagadoki no Kyoushikyoku	Genki	2010	August 9, 2024 ^{NS, PC}	Unreleased	Unreleased	Yes	Yes
Bokujou Monogatari Mobile: Life & Love (For Boy and For Girl are both included)	Marvelous	2007	September 5, 2024 ^{NS, PC}	Unreleased	Unreleased	Yes	Yes
Utakata no Sora	Althi	2008	October 3, 2024 ^{NS}	Unreleased	Unreleased	Yes	No
Tōdō Ryūnosuke Tantei Nikki Vol. 5: Kamezō Shuzō Satsujin Jiken	Althi	2006	October 17, 2024 ^{NS}	Unreleased	Unreleased	Yes	No
Spica Adventure	Taito	2003	December 5, 2024 ^{NS}	Unreleased	Unreleased	Yes	No
Psycho Mystery Series Vol. 7: Yokohama Bokushikan Satsujin Jiken	Genki	2006	January 9, 2025 ^{NS}	Unreleased	Unreleased	Yes	No
Tantei Kibukawa Ryōsuke Jikentan Vol. 16: Awayuki wa hi no Kanashimi	Genki	2011	January 23, 2025 ^{NS} January 28, 2025 ^{PC}	Unreleased	Unreleased	Yes	Yes
Tōdō Ryūnosuke Tantei Nikki Vol. 6: Zakuro no Tenkyō - Kisshō Chūshūsai Renzoku Satsujin Jiken	Althi	2006	March 6, 2025 ^{NS}	Unreleased	Unreleased	Yes	No
Bokujō Monogatari: Mobile Life (For Boy and For Girl are both included)	Marvelous	2005	March 29, 2025 ^{NS, PC}	Unreleased	Unreleased	Yes	Yes
Armored Core: Mobile Mission	FromSoftware	2004	April 16, 2025 ^{NS} April 30, 2025 ^{PC}	Unreleased	Unreleased	Yes	Yes
Shin Megami Tensei 20XX	Atlus & BBMF	2004	April 24, 2025 ^{NS, PC}	Unreleased	Unreleased	Yes	Yes
Psycho Mystery Series Vol. 8: Izanami no hanamuko	Genki	2006	May 22, 2025 ^{NS}	Unreleased	Unreleased	Yes	No
Armored Core: Mobile 2	FromSoftware	2005	June 19, 2025 ^{NS, PC}	Unreleased	Unreleased	Yes	Yes
Maou ga Ochiruhi II	Jaleco	2008	July 17, 2025 ^{NS}	Unreleased	Unreleased	Yes	No
Tantei Kibukawa Ryōsuke Jikentan Vol. 17: Midōmaru-tei Jiken	Genki	2011	August 7, 2025 ^{NS} August 20, 2025 ^{PC}	Unreleased	Unreleased	Yes	Yes
Exerion DX	Jaleco	2002	August 21, 2025 ^{NS}	Unreleased	Unreleased	Yes	No
Shin Megami Tensei: Tokyo Requiem	BBMF	2007	August 29, 2025 ^{NS}	Unreleased	Unreleased	Yes	Yes
Stella Deus: Shikkoku no Seirei	BBMF	2006	September 4, 2025 ^{NS} September 18, 2025 ^{PC}	Unreleased	Unreleased	Yes	Yes
Tōdō Ryūnosuke Tantei Nikki Vol. 7: Nibiiro no Tenbin - Onidzuka-tei Renzoku Satsujin Jiken	Althi	2007	October 2, 2025 ^{NS}	Unreleased	Unreleased	Yes	No
Psycho Mystery Series Vol. 9: Chain - Hakuba no Kishi Rensa Satsujin Jiken	Genki	2006	October 9, 2025 ^{NS}	Unreleased	Unreleased	Yes	No
Stella Deus: Renkinjutsu no Jikan	Atlus & BBMF	2007	November 20, 2025 ^{NS} December 3, 2025 ^{PC}	Unreleased	Unreleased	Yes	Yes
Mugen-mai-sō: Monstre Waltz	HOPEMOON	2007	December 22, 2025 ^{NS} February 13, 2026^{PC}	Unreleased	Unreleased	Yes	Yes
Armored Core: Mobile 3	FromSoftware	2007	January 22, 2026 ^{NS, PC}	Unreleased	Unreleased	Yes	Yes
Flash Motor Karen	HOPEMOON	2008	February 5, 2026 ^{NS, PC}	Unreleased	Unreleased	Yes	Yes
Keiji J.B. Harold no Jikenbō Vol. 1: Murder Club	Althi	2004	February 19, 2026 ^{NS}	Unreleased	Unreleased	Yes	No
Digital Devil Saga: Avatar Tuner - A's TEST Server Kanzen-ban	Atlus & BBMF	2006	April 16, 2026 ^{NS, PC}	Unreleased	Unreleased	Yes	Yes
Xenosaga: Pied Piper	BNEI	2004	April 30, 2026 ^{NS, PC}	Unreleased	Unreleased	Yes	Yes
Namco Chronicle	BNEI	2011	May 28, 2026 ^{NS, PC}	Unreleased	Unreleased	Yes	Yes
Tōdō Ryūnosuke Tantei Nikki Vol. 8: Sumire-sei no Torikago - Ningyō Yashiki Renzoku Satsujin Jiken	Althi	2008	June 4, 2026 ^{NS}	Unreleased	Unreleased	Yes	No
Pac-Man	BNEI	2001	June 18, 2026 ^{NS, PC}	Unreleased	Unreleased	Yes	Yes
