= Megami Ibunroku Persona: Ikū no Tō-hen =

2006 video game

- Title screen
- Developer: Bbmf
- Publishers: Bbmf (mobile); G-Mode (Switch, Windows)
- Series: Persona
- Platforms: Mobile phones; Nintendo Switch; Windows
- Release: Mobile phones: JP: December 1, 2006; Nintendo Switch: JP: September 14, 2023; Windows: JP: September 29, 2023
- Genre: Role-playing
- Mode: Single-player

Megami Ibunroku Persona: Ikū no Tō-hen (Note: Megami Ibunroku Persona: Ikū no Tō-hen (Japanese: 女神異聞録ペルソナ 異空の塔編; "Alternate Tale of the Goddess: Persona — Otherworldly Tower Chapter")) is a 2006 role-playing video game developed and published by Bbmf. It is a spin-off from Atlus's 1996 game Revelations: Persona, and part of the Persona series, itself a part of the larger Megami Tensei series. It was originally released for Japanese feature phones in December 2006 and was re-released by G-Mode as part of their G-Mode Archives+ line for Nintendo Switch and Windows in September 2023.

The game has the player fight demons in a turn-based combat system while exploring a dungeon in a first-person perspective. It is set during the events of the 1996 game, and follows its cast of Persona-users as they become stranded between worlds and try to return to their own. The developers designed Ikū no Tō-hen as a side story, and introduced new mechanics such as a randomly generated dungeon to make the game interesting for players who have already played Revelations: Persona. The game was well received for its mysterious atmosphere and the replay value brought by its randomly generated dungeon.

== Gameplay ==
The player uses the party members' Persona abilities to fight demons in a turn-based combat system.

Megami Ibunroku Persona: Ikū no Tō-hen is a role-playing video game, and plays similarly to Revelations: Persona. Through a first-person perspective, the player navigates a randomly generated dungeon that shifts each they enter, with the goal of finding a way out. The player encounters demons throughout, which they fight in a turn-based combat system using weapons and their Persona abilities; if the entire party falls in combat, they lose all their items and money.

As an alternative to fighting, the player can negotiate with the demons to acquire spell cards: by fusing several of these, they can create new Personas for the party, enabling new abilities in battle. The player can also improve the party by equipping them with weapons and armor, which they can take to a refinery to improve through the use of gems found in the dungeon.

== Premise ==
Ikū no Tō-hen is set during the story of Revelations: Persona, and follows a group of St. Hermelin High School students in the town of Mikage, who have the power to fight by summoning Personas – a representation of their hidden inner selves. It begins after the group's battle in the local SEBEC building, when the out-of-control DEVA System transports them to a place between worlds where demons roam. Igor, the facilitator of fusion in the Velvet Room, instructs them to climb a tower to return to their own world.

== Development and release ==
Ikū no Tō-hen was developed by Bbmf, who created it as a side story based on Revelations: Persona, with many returning mechanics, while introducing some new ones and including a new story to make the game feel worthwhile to those who have already played the original. One such new mechanic was how the player's party loses their money and items upon defeat, to add a sense of tension to the play experience; another was the randomly generated dungeon, to allow for endless exploration.

Bbmf released the game in Japan for various feature phones starting on December 1, 2006, simultaneously with their game Stella Deus: Raven Spirits and their mobile phone port of Digital Devil Story: Megami Tensei II. Later that month, it became the first larger role-playing game to be released through the Megaten Alpha mobile game distribution service.

After being unavailable for years, Ikū no Tō-hen was re-released by G-Mode for Nintendo Switch and Windows on September 14 and September 19, 2023, respectively, as part of their G-Mode Archives+ series. Like with other releases in the line, the intent was to retain the game as it was, with the same gameplay and presentation as the mobile phone version, including its square screen. G-Mode's release does not add any new language options on top of Japanese; games news site Siliconera found it likely that it, like G-Mode's other Megami Tensei re-releases, would remain Japanese-only. GamesRadar+ considered this understandable due to the game's obscurity, but expressed hope that the wider availability of the PC version could open the door to an English fan translation.

== Reception ==
Ikū no Tō-hen was well received: Dengeki Online called it a great role-playing game, and Famitsu considered it a fun game that breathes new life into its returning characters, that improves on Revelations: Persona with good replay value due to the randomly generated dungeon, and not something Megami Tensei fans would want to miss. Inside Games liked its atmosphere for its darker and more mysterious tone compared to later Persona games, instead being more similar to the Shin Megami Tensei series. Retrospectively, Mynavi News and Inside Games both called it a nostalgic role-playing game, and the former reported on positive player response to the G-Mode release.
