= Magical Drop III =

1997 video game

- Developer: Data East (Note: Ported to Game Boy Color by Conspiracy Entertainment, Zeebo by Onan Games)
- Publishers: Data East: JP: Data East; NA: SNK (ARC) PlayStation; JP: Data East; EU: Swing! Entertainment Neo Geo Pocket Color; JP: Data East; NA/EU: SNK Game Boy Color; EU: Swing! Entertainment; NA: Conspiracy Entertainment (Note: Released under the Classified Games banner) MediaKite Distribution (Windows) G-Mode (Zeebo)
- Producer: Naomi Susa
- Designer: Shungo Katagiri
- Programmer: M. Saiki
- Artists: Hiroshi Hachiya; Hitomi Hashimoto; Itokku Seta; Kumiko Oka
- Composers: Hiroaki Yoshida; Masaaki Iwasaki; Shinichi Yamazaki; Tatsuya Kiuchi
- Series: Magical Drop
- Platform: Arcade: Neo Geo AES, Sega Saturn, PlayStation, Neo Geo Pocket Color, Game Boy Color, Microsoft Windows, Zeebo
- Release: February 25, 1997: Arcade; JP: February 25, 1997; NA: March 1997 Neo Geo AES; JP: April 25, 1997 Sega Saturn; JP: June 20, 1997 PlayStation; JP: October 30, 1997; EU: July 23, 2000 Neo Geo Pocket Color; JP: June 24, 1999; NA: December 5, 1999; EU: March 4, 2000 Game Boy Color; EU: August 25, 2000; NA: October 18, 2000 Windows; JP: December 22, 2000 Zeebo; BRA: April 22, 2010
- Genre: Puzzle
- Modes: Single-player, multiplayer
- Arcade system: Neo Geo MVS

Magical Drop III (Note: Japanese: マジカルドロップ 3, Hepburn: Majikaru Doroppu 3) is a 1997 puzzle video game developed and published by Data East for the Neo Geo arcade and home platforms. It was later ported to Sega Saturn, PlayStation, Neo Geo Pocket Color, Game Boy Color, Windows, and Zeebo. It is the third entry in the Magical Drop series and the final entry released in arcades, as well as Data East's final arcade game before their withdrawal from the coin-op industry. In the game, the player takes control of one of several characters, battling against computer-controlled opponents. Gameplay is similar to previous entries albeit with further additions; the objective is to clear the screen of constantly advancing colored 'drops' via a character placed at the bottom of the playfield, which can grab drops and make them disappear by putting drops as a column of three or more of the same color. The player can also participate in a board-style adventure mode, while two players can play against each other in a competitive versus mode.

Magical Drop III was produced by Naomi Susa, with Shungo Katagiri acting as the game's planner, while the soundtrack was scored by Gamadelic. It proved popular among players, with the Saturn and PlayStation versions selling over 10,392 and 8,286 copies in their first week on the Japanese market respectively, garnering favorable reception from critics and retrospective reviewers. The game has since been re-released through download services for various consoles and on compilations. It was followed by Magical Drop F: Daibōken Mo Rakujyanai! (1999).

== Gameplay ==
Gameplay screenshot showcasing a match between World and Justice.

Like its predecessors, Magical Drop III is a puzzle game where the player takes control of one of several characters named after a tarot card, battling against computer-controlled opponents. Gameplay is similar to Magical Drop (1995) and Magical Drop II (1996), albeit with further additions; the objective is to clear the screen from a stack of constantly advancing colored 'drops' that descend from the top of the playfield. Drops can be picked up and dropped by the player's character, which is placed at the bottom of the screen, and they disappear when three or more of the same color are put together on a single column. Chains are formed either when a single drop caused a chain reaction or when more than one group of drops are cleared in quick succession. Forming chains cause the opponent's stack to descend faster.

One notable gameplay addition is the introduction of a third button, which allows players to add rows to their field at any time. It is also possible to grab normal and special pieces at the same time. Two players can also participate in a competitive versus mode (one may be a computer opponent), featuring attack patterns that sends lines to the opponent in non-even rows that vary by character. An adventure mode called "Magical Journey" is also introduced, which is a board game that challenges players to reach Empress before computer-controlled rivals by participating in minigames. The game is over once a player is defeated when the stack of drops hits the bottom.

=== Characters ===
The original cast from Magical Drop and Magical Drop II returns. In addition, the game adds representatives for the remaining tarot major arcana cards, as well as introducing a "daughter" Strength character that more closely resembles the traditional depiction of Strength.

- Fool
- Magician
- High Priestess
- Chariot
- Devil
- Star
- World
- Justice
- Father Strength
- Empress
- Black Pierrot
- Emperor
- Hierophant
- Lovers
- Daughter Strength
- Death
- Temperance
- Sun
- Judgement
- Hermit
- Moon
- Hanged Man
- Tower
- Wheel of Fortune

== Development ==
Magical Drop III was developed by Data East, which had previously worked on Magical Drop II (1996) for Neo Geo. It was produced by Naomi Susa, with Shungo Katagiri acting as the game's planner. M. Saki, as well as two staffer under the pseudonyms "Tac.H" and "Poconyan", served as the game's programmers. Hiroshi Hachiya, Hitomi Hashimoto, Itokku Seta, Kumiko Oka, N. Ishizuka, Rie Sakurai, Seigo Nishiwaki, Shōji Takeuchi, Tomoyuki Arakawa, and Yoshinari Kaiho were responsible for the artwork. The soundtrack was scored by Gamadelic members Hiroaki "Maro" Yoshida, Masaaki "Koremasa" Iwasaki, Shinichi "Sin" Yamazaki, and Tatsuya "nmRtk" Kiuchi. The development team recounted the project's creation and history in interviews.

== Release ==
Magical Drop III was first released for the Neo Geo arcade system (MVS) in Japan by Data East on February 25, 1997, and later in North America by SNK on March. There are differences between the original Japanese version and English release, such as the removal of Japanese voice acting and rival opponents in adventure mode, among other changes. On March 21, an album containing music from the game was co-published in Japan by Scitron and Pony Canyon. It was also published in Japan for the Neo Geo home system (AES) on April 25. On June 20, the game was first ported to the Sega Saturn under the subtitle Toretate Zoukangou!. (Note: とれたて増刊号！ (Toretate Zōkangō!)) A North American localization under the title Magical Drop was showcased at E3 1997 and planned to be released by Koei, but was never released. The Saturn version changes the speed and various other aspects of gameplay. On October 30, the game was then ported to PlayStation under the subtitle Yokubari Tokudaigou!, (Note: よくばり特大号！ (Yokubari Tokudaigō!)) which allows the player to choose between the Saturn's re-balanced version and a version more faithful to the original arcade iteration. In 1998, the Saturn version was re-released as part of the "Sakatore" budget line.

A second PlayStation version titled Magical Drop III + Wonderful was first released in Japan on February 25, 1999, featuring the re-balanced gameplay from Yokubari Tokudaigou! and includes a port of Magical Drop Plus 1!. The game was also ported to the Neo Geo Pocket Color as Magical Drop Pocket, first being released in Japan by Data East on June 24, then by SNK in North America on December 5 and later in Europe on March 4, 2000. On July 23, Magical Drop III + Wonderful was released in PAL regions by Swing! Entertainment as simply Magical Drop III. The game was ported by Conspiracy Entertainment to Game Boy Color as simply Magical Drop as well, first released in Europe by Swing! Entertainment on August 25 and later in North America by Classified Games on October 18. The GBC version does not include a CPU mode, and thus players only gain access to the full character roster by playing two-player mode. On December 22, a Microsoft Windows port based on Toretate Zoukangou! was released only in Japan by MediaKite Distribution. In 2001, Magical Drop III + Wonderful was re-released by Taito as a budget title.

Magical Drop III has since been re-released through various digital distribution platforms, such as the subscription service GameTap. In 2009, the first PlayStation version (Yokubari Tokudaigou!) was re-released on PlayStation Network in Japan. In 2010, it was included as part of Data East Arcade Classics for Wii. On April 22, the game was ported by Onan Games to Zeebo and distributed in Brazil by G-Mode. The game was also re-released for the Wii's Virtual Console first in Japan on July 6, then in North America on December 27, and later in Europe on January 14, 2011. In 2018, Hamster Corporation re-released the game for Nintendo Switch, PlayStation 4, and Xbox One as part of their ACA Neo Geo series. It was re-released on the AntStream service as well.

== Reception ==
Reception

Review scores
| Publication | Score | | | |
| Publication | Arcade | GBC | PS | Saturn |
|---|---|---|---|---|
| AllGame | 3.5/5 stars | 3.5/5 stars | N/A | N/A |
| Famitsu | N/A | N/A | N/A | 25/40 |
| GamesMaster | N/A | 75% | N/A | N/A |
| IGN | N/A | 5.0/10 | N/A | N/A |
| Jeuxvideo.com | N/A | 12/20 | N/A | N/A |
| M! Games | N/A | N/A | 68% | N/A |
| Mega Fun | N/A | 66% | 67% | N/A |
| Player One | 85% | N/A | N/A | N/A |
| Video Games (DE) | N/A | 3/5 stars | 59% | N/A |
| big.N | N/A | 3/5 stars | N/A | N/A |
| Dengeki PlayStation | N/A | N/A | 90/100, 80/100 | N/A |
| Fun Generation | N/A | N/A | 74% | N/A |
| Neo Geo Freak | 15/20 | N/A | N/A | N/A |
| Pocket Magazine | N/A | 3/5 | N/A | N/A |
| Saturn Fan | N/A | N/A | N/A | 8.0/10 |
| Sega Saturn Magazine (JP) | N/A | N/A | N/A | 8.0/10 |

In Japan, Game Machine listed Magical Drop III on their April 1, 1997 issue as being the third most-popular arcade game for the previous two weeks. The game garnered favorable reception from critics. Readers of the Japanese Sega Saturn Magazine voted to give the game a 9.0414 out of 10 score, ranking among Sega Saturn games at the number 68 spot in a 2000 public poll. According to Famitsu, the Saturn and PlayStation versions sold over 10,392 and 8,286 copies in their first week on the Japanese market respectively.

GamePro's Johnny Ballgame and Major Mike stated "it's just as addictive as Magical Drop II". Saturn Fan's five critics found the game highly addictive, regarding it as the most strategic entry in the series. Player One's Christophe Delpierre and François Daniel commented that "Magical Drop 3 offers a great alternative for Puzzle Bobble fans." AllGame's Kyle Knight labelled it as one of the best puzzle games on Neo Geo, praising the upgraded audiovisual presentation, new characters, addictive gameplay, and responsive controls.

Reviewing the Game Boy Color version, German publication Fun Color noted its overall simplicity and wrote that "Magical Drop is a cool alternative to the usual Tetris stuff." Jeuxvideo.com's Lucas also reviewed the GBC version, commending the colorful visuals, endearing characters, controls, and music. big.N's Florian Seidel reviewed the GBC port as well, commending the game's idea and Game Boy Printer support, but criticized the lack of additional modes. Video Games' Christian Daxer reviewed the Wonderful re-release on PlayStation, recommending Magical Drop III over Magical Drop Plus 1!, citing its story and two-player versus modes.

An editor for Video Games agreed with Seidel when reviewing the GBC conversion, noting that there are only two game modes, but ultimately found it to be a "good average" title. IGN's Craig Harris also reviewed the GBC port, highlighting its versus mode when using a link cable, but compared its graphical presentation unfavorably to the Neo Geo Pocket Color version. Harris wrote "Tetris it isn't, but Magical Drop has its own merits as a puzzle game that makes it fun to play." The Italian edition of GamesMaster reviewed both the NGPC and GBC versions, finding them to be "bizarre" but fun and enjoyable titles. Fun Generation's Simon Krätschmer gave the Wonderful re-release on PlayStation an overall average outlook.

Reviewing the Wonderful re-release on PlayStation, MAN!AC's Ulrich Steppberger felt that the gameplay of Magical Drop III was chaotic, while finding Magical Drop Plus 1! graphically outdated but commended its inclusion. Mega Fun's Henry Ernst analyzed the Game Boy Color port, concluding "All in all an average title with good, GBC-typical graphics. Fans of this game genre should definitely get their money's worth and be busy for a while due to the enormous potential for addiction." Pocket Magazine's Benoît B. echoed similar thoughts as Seidel and Video Games regarding the lack of additional game modes when comparing the NGPC version with the GBC port. Benoît also found the story mode incomplete and the music "tiresome". In contrasts to other reviewers, Jay Semerad of AllGame gave the GBC conversion a positive outlook, highlighting its visuals, frantic two-player mode, and replay value.

=== Retrospective coverage ===
Retrospective commentary for Magical Drop III has been equally favorable. Reviewing the re-release on the Wii's Virtual Console, Nintendo Life's Corbie Dillard lauded its single-player and multiplayer component, refined gameplay, visuals, soundtrack, and game modes. In a retrospective outlook of the NGPC port, Hardcore Gamer's Steve Hannley regarded it as a faithful conversion, highlighting the game's speed and framerate, but saw its condensed playfield, English translation, and lack of additional modes as negative points. Reviewing the Arcade Archives re-release on Nintendo Switch, Nintendo World Report's Donald Theriault commended its easy-to-learn gameplay, various game modes, and control options, but criticized its frustrating board mode and forgettable music. Dave Frear of Nintendo Life disagreed with Theriault when analyzing the ACA re-release on Switch, giving it a highly positive outlook.
