= Topolon =

2002 video game

- Developer: G-Mode
- Publisher: G-Mode
- Platforms: Mobile phone (J2ME), web browser, Nintendo Switch
- Release: Mobile phones: JP: May 15, 2002; NA: 2006; EU: 2006; Web browsers: WW: August 3, 2006; Nintendo Switch: JP: December 10, 2020; NA: January 14, 2021; EU: January 7, 2021
- Genre: Puzzle
- Mode: Single-player

Topolon (Note: Japanese: トポロン, Hepburn: Toporon) is a puzzle video game developed and published by Japanese studio G-Mode for mobile phones in 2002. Over the years, the game was released on many different mobile platforms in many countries. A version for Nintendo Switch was released in 2020 as a part of the G-Mode Archives series.

The objective of the game is to clear the playing field from multiplying particles by moving the cursor and clicking on them before the energy runs out.

Topolon was well received by critics with praise focused on its innovative and unique gameplay. The game won "Best Puzzle Game" and "Mobile Game of the Year" at GameSpot and Wireless Gaming Review's the Wireless Gaming Awards 2005.

== Gameplay ==
Screenshot of Topolon: three nodes are infected with Nuruons (purple) and one with a Megaon (red)

According to the game's tutorial, the player must protect the nano circuit Topolon from electronic viruses called Nuruons that emerge in the circuit's nodes.

The game presents the player with a grid that consists of nodes connected to each other by electric wires. The player controls a probe that can be moved between the nodes and used to tap the nodes. When a node with a Nuruon is tapped, the virus multiplies and the new viruses escape to adjacent nodes. Tapping nodes adjacent to the nodes infected with Nuruons draws the viruses to those nodes. Nuruons disappear from the field if crash each other. Every node tapping and every Nuruon multiplication draws the energy from the circuit. The objective of the game is to clear the grid from viruses before the energy runs out.

Nuruons can evolve into Megaons, more advanced forms that can't be affected by tapping. They disappear only when hit by Nuruons several times.

== Release ==
Topolon was developed and released by G-Mode for Japanese mobile phones on May 15, 2002, for SoftBank's S!Appli network service. Later, it was released for other Japanese services such as EZweb and i-Mode. A Flash version of the game was made available at GungHo Online Entertainment's web gaming portal GungHo Games on August 3, 2006, as one of its launch titles. An updated version of Topolon with enhanced graphics was released in Europe and North America by an Irish company Upstart Games the same year.

The original version of the game was digitally released on Nintendo Switch on December 10, 2020, in Japan as part of the G-Mode Archives series. This version was released in Europe on January 7, 2021; and in North America on January 14, 2021.

== Reception ==
Reception

Review scores
Publication	Score
GameSpot	8.5/10
IGN	8.9/10
Pocket Gamer	3.5/5

Topolon earned critical acclaim. Jeff Gerstmann of GameSpot praised the game and said that it successfully imitates the aesthetic of early arcade games like Qix. He concluded that the game "has roughly everything you'd want from a mobile puzzler". This is one of the best puzzlers you'll play all year. Levi Buchanan reviewed Topolon for IGN and stated that "this is one of the best puzzlers you'll play all year". Dean Mortlock of Pocket Gamer called Topolon's gameplay unique and addictive.
