= Magical Drop V =

2012 video game

- Developer: Golgoth Studio
- Publisher: UTV Ignition Entertainment
- Composer: Sam Cheboub
- Series: Magical Drop
- Platform: Microsoft Windows
- Release: WW: November 15, 2012
- Genre: Puzzle
- Modes: Single-player, multiplayer

Magical Drop V is a 2012 puzzle video game developed by Golgoth Studio and published by UTV Ignition Entertainment for Microsoft Windows. It is the sixth entry in the Magical Drop series, preceding Magical Drop Touch (2009) for iOS and Android platforms. In the game, the player takes control of one of several characters, battling against computer-controlled opponents. The objective is to clear the screen of constantly advancing colored 'drops' via a character placed at the bottom of the playfield, which can grab drops and make them disappear by putting them as a column of three or more drops of the same color. Characters and mechanics from the cancelled Data East game Ghostlop (1996) are also introduced. Two or more players can participate in local and online multiplayer modes.

Magical Drop V garnered generally unfavorable reception from reviewers; Some felt divided regarding the audio and inclusion of elements from Ghostlop, while criticism was geared towards the numerous technical issues, lack of series-staple features and mechanics, poor English translation, and weak visual presentation. Versions for Xbox Live Arcade and PlayStation Network were announced, but ultimately never materialized. In 2020, the game was delisted for purchase from Steam. It was followed by Magical Drop VI in 2023.

== Gameplay ==
Screenshot of a multiplayer match, showcasing gameplay of Bruce from the unreleased game Ghostlop

Magical Drop V is a puzzle game similar to previous entries in the Magical Drop series, where the player takes control of one of several characters named after a tarot card, battling against computer-controlled opponents. The objective is to clear the screen from a stack of constantly advancing colored 'drops' that descend from the top of the playfield. Drops can be picked up and dropped by the player's character, which is placed at the bottom of the screen, and they disappear when three or more of the same color are put together on a single column. Chains are formed either when a single drop caused a chain reaction or when more than one group of drops are cleared in quick succession. Forming chains cause the opponent's stack to descend faster. The game features a much smaller selection of characters, omits items, and removes P"uzzle" mode, but it adds new online gameplay modes. Characters from the cancelled Data East puzzle game Ghostlop (1996) are introduced; these three characters use Ghostlop gameplay instead of the series' traditional mechanics. The game is over once a player is defeated when the stack of drops hits the bottom.

== Development and release ==
Magical Drop V was first unveiled at E3 2011 by publisher UTV Ignition Entertainment and slated for a late 2011 release. Ignition Entertainment struck a deal with G-Mode, a Japanese company which owns various franchises and titles by Data East, to make the game. It was created by Golgoth Studio, an independent French game developer responsible for the enhanced remake of Toki (2019), with Sam Cheboub being responsible for the game's soundtrack. In January 2012, an Xbox Live Arcade (XBLA) version was also announced and the game was then planned for a summer launch. However, it missed the summer release but Golgoth Studio later clarified that Ignition approved an internal beta and they were nearing a mastered version. To promote the launch, Golgoth Studio released the game's soundtrack online for free via their official website and SoundCloud on October of that year. The game was released for Microsoft Windows via Steam on November 15, while the XBLA version was delayed to 2013. Neither the XBLA version and a planned PlayStation Network version ever materialized. In July 2020, the game was later made unavailable to purchase from Steam.

== Reception ==
Reception

Review scores
Publication	Score
Destructoid	4.5/10
Gamekult	2.5/5 stars
Joystiq	2.5/5 stars
PCActu	4.5/10
ZTGD	3.9/10

Magical Drop V garnered generally unfavorable reviews from critics. Destructoid's Allistair Pinsof found the game below average, citing the lack of puzzle and adventure mode from previous entries, dull story mode, graphical department, lackluster design, technical issues, and poor English translation. Pinsof also found the addition of Bruce from the unreleased Ghostlop (1996) as an "odd compromise". Gamekult's Valentin Lormeau commended the gameplay, music, and introduction of characters and mechanics from Ghostlop. Nevertheless, Lormeau ultimately regarded it as an "unpleasant experience", criticizing its rushed nature, numerous bugs, and online multiplayer. A reviewer writing for PCActu expressed disappointment towards the game's weak visuals, playability, repetitive audio, as well as the lack of puzzle mode, but highlighted the multiplayer as its strongest point.

Drew Leachman of ZTGD gave positive remarks to the game's simple concept and soundtrack, but lambasted its sluggish controls, inconsistent AI, lag during online matches, and poor translation. Joystiq's Heidi Kemps concurred with Pinsof and echoed similar thoughts regarding the Engrish translation, numerous glitches, lack of series-staple features, and disparate playstyle of Bruce from Ghostlop compared to other character. Rice Digital's Pete Davison felt that Magical Drop V failed to live up to the rest of the Magical Drop series, noting its lack of polish and bugs, among other issues. Davison also saw the incorporation of elements from Ghostlop to be an interesting but "ill-advised" feature.
