= Aegis: The First Mission =

2007 video game

- Title screen
- Developer: Bbmf
- Publishers: Bbmf (mobile); G-Mode (Switch, Windows)
- Series: Persona
- Engine: Unity (Switch, Windows)
- Platforms: Mobile phones; Nintendo Switch; Windows
- Release: Mobile phones: JP: October 29, 2007; Switch, Windows: JP: June 6, 2024
- Genre: Action role-playing
- Mode: Single-player

Aegis: The First Mission (Note: Japanese: アイギス THE FIRST MISSION, Hepburn: Aigisu Za Fāsuto Misshon) is a 2007 action role-playing video game developed and published by Bbmf. It is a prequel to Atlus's 2006 game Persona 3, and part of the Persona series, itself a part of the larger Megami Tensei series. It was originally released for Japanese feature phones in October 2007, after which it became unavailable for years and was considered lost, until G-Mode's re-release for Nintendo Switch and Windows as part of their G-Mode Archives+ line in June 2024.

The story takes place ten years prior to the events of Persona 3, and follows the humanoid robot Aigis (Note: The character's name is spelled "Aegis" in Japan, and "Aigis" in the West.) as she battles enemies during an incident at the Kirijo Ergonomics Research Laboratory on the Japanese island Yakushima. The game was well received for its action gameplay, story, and visuals, particularly for the aesthetics of the environments.

== Gameplay ==
As the robot Aigis, the player fights enemies using weapons and her persona Palladion.

Aegis: The First Mission is an action role-playing game in which players take the role of the humanoid robot Aigis, who can run and jump in 3D, and battle enemies while exploring the research laboratory, nature scenes on the island of Yakushima, and dungeons. They have access to three weapon types: a gun, a grenade launcher, and a drill for melee combat. These can be upgraded by visiting the research laboratory, increasing the amount of damage they deal and adding new functions, such as letting the player shoot bullets in a wider spread. The player can also buy armor and other items in the laboratory, and can find new foot equipment in treasure chests throughout the game.

In addition to using weapons, the player can spend soul points (SP) to use Aigis's persona Palladion to activate offensive and supportive skills; this is at times necessary, as some enemies are immune to her weapons. Defeating enemies earns the player money and experience points, raising Aigis's level; (Note: See Famitsu, RPGFan, Inside, and Siliconera.) as her level goes up, Palladion learns more skills.

== Premise ==
Aegis: The First Mission is set on the Japanese island Yakushima over six days in May 1999, ten years prior to the events of Persona 3. It follows the humanoid robot Aigis's early life during an incident at the Kirijo Ergonomics Research Laboratory, together with her trainer Sota Aizawa (相沢 総太, Aizawa Sōta) and the chief scientist Yu Kimijima (君嶋 夕, Kimijima Yū).

== Development and release ==
Aegis: The First Mission was developed and published by Bbmf for Japanese feature phones starting on October 29, 2007, through the mobile game distribution service Megaten Alpha. After the original feature phone release, the game became unavailable; video game preservationists tried to find phones from the time with the game still installed, but were unsuccessful. It was considered lost until 2024, when G-Mode announced their plans to publish it for Nintendo Switch and Windows as the 100th game in their G-Mode Archives+ line of mobile game re-releases, having received many requests for it from fans. G-Mode's version was re-built in the game engine Unity, rather than using emulation, and was published on June 6, 2024, as Persona 3 Aegis: The First Mission. (Note: ペルソナ3 アイギス THE FIRST MISSION, Perusona Surī Aigisu Za Fāsuto Misshon)

== Reception ==
Reception

Review score
Publication	Score
RPGFan	80/100

Aegis: The First Mission was well received by critics, who recommended it to Persona 3 players. RPGFan liked the action gameplay, saying that it exceeded their expectations and had responsive and smooth controls for a mobile game, although found the weapons unbalanced, describing the drill and grenade launcher as useless. They found the story fun and the characters likeable but flat, with Kimijima as the one exception: they considered her well-developed, and enjoyed the story thread of her dealing with questions about existence and the value of life, while the other characters primarily existed to support her development, wishing that Aigis had been more integral to the story.

The game's art direction and graphics were well received: Dengeki Online liked the game's "beautiful" 3D world, and RPGFan considered it aesthetically impressive, with character models on around the same level as the 1997 game Final Fantasy VII, and scenic environments such as nature areas and psychedelic dungeons.
