= Windjammers 2 =

2022 video game

- Developer: Dotemu
- Publisher: Dotemu
- Producers: Christian Cortez; Alban Ligouzat
- Designer: Jordi Ascensio
- Programmer: Kévin Delbrayelle
- Artist: Simon Périn
- Composers: Seiichi Hamada; Hiroaki Yoshida; Harumi Fujita; Sylvain Hellio
- Platforms: Nintendo Switch; PlayStation 4; Stadia; Windows; Xbox One
- Release: January 20, 2022
- Genre: Sports
- Modes: Single-player, multiplayer

Windjammers 2 is a 2022 sports video game developed and published by Dotemu. It is the sequel to the 1994 Neo Geo game Windjammers, co-produced by Data East and SNK. Windjammers 2 was released for Nintendo Switch, PlayStation 4, Stadia, Windows, and Xbox One on January 20, 2022. It received generally positive reviews from critics, who praised the visuals, new content and gameplay mechanics.

== Gameplay ==
In Windjammers 2, players must try to throw a flying disc into theirs opponent's goal while protecting their own.

Windjammers 2 is a sports game played from a top-down perspective, in which players must try to throw a flying disc into their opponent's goal while protecting their own. Players can earn 3 or 5 points by landing the disc into their opponent's goal in the yellow or red zones respectively, but if they fail to catch the disc before it hits the ground, this is called a "Miss" and the opponent gets 2 or 4 points depending on the arena. Players win a set by achieving a certain number of points (by default 15) or by having more points than their opponent after a certain amount of time (by default 90 seconds; unlike most timed sports, time does not stop after a score). In the event of a tie, the set counts for both players. Players win a match by winning a certain number of sets (by default 2).

Players can choose from a total of 13 playable characters. Besides all six characters from the original Windjammers, the initial version of Windjammers 2 contains four all-new characters, namely Jao Raposa of Brazil, Max Hurricane of Canada, Sammy Ho of China, and Sophie De Lys of France. There is also a secret playable character called Disc Man, who can be selected by performing a particular trick while at the character selection screen. Two additional characters, Anna Szalinski of Poland and the cyborg Jamma GX03, were added as part of a free update, bringing the total to 13. Each character has their own attributes. For instance, some characters have more steady control than others at the cost of speed. Each character also has their own EX Move, which is a special power can be that activated for gameplay advantages. Players can compete on 10 different courts, including all six courts from Windjammers, which feature different goal zones and gameplay properties. Both single-player and local multiplayer modes are featured. The game includes an "Arcade Mode", where multiple matches are played through championships. Windjammers 2 launched with cross-platform play between the Windows and Xbox One versions, later expanded to all systems following an update in October 2023.

== Development ==
Dotemu, the game's developer and publisher, approached Paon DP, the intellectual property owner for Windjammers, a chance to develop a port to the original game and develop a brand new game in the series. In order to be faithful to the original game, Kevin Delbrayelle, who had retro-engineered the first game during the production of its port, returned to lead the sequel's technical development. Similar to Wonder Boy: The Dragon's Trap and Streets of Rage 4, the game features hand-drawn 2D animation visuals. The game's pre-production started in late 2017 and the title was officially announced during a Nintendo Direct held in August 2018.

The game was planned for a 2019 release on Nintendo Switch and Windows, but got delayed to early 2020. In December 2020, Dotemu confirmed that the game was delayed again to 2021. Over the course of its development, versions for PlayStation 4, Stadia, and Xbox One were also added. The game was released on January 20, 2022. A version for Amazon Luna was made available on November 4, 2022.

A free update in October 2023 added two additional characters, a training mode, and reworked online functionality, including cross-platform play on all systems, a spectator mode, and online lobby support.

== Reception ==
Reception

Aggregate score
Aggregator	Score
Metacritic	NS: 78/100; PC: 79/100; PS4: 74/100; XONE: 80/100

Review scores
Publication	Score
Destructoid	7.5/10
Game Informer	6.75/10
GameSpot	7/10
Hardcore Gamer	4/5
IGN	8/10
Nintendo Life	9/10
PC Gamer (US)	70/100
Shacknews	8/10
The Guardian	4/5

Windjammers 2 received "generally favorable" reviews from critics for most platforms, according to review aggregator Metacritic; the PlayStation 4 version received "mixed or average" reviews.

Eurogamer gave the title a positive review, praising how faithful the gameplay was to the original: "Indeed, this is a more conservative thing than Streets of Rage 4, in part by necessity - the fundamentals are precisely the same, and beneath the glossy new visuals the movement of each character and the arc of the discus exactly the same on an old Astro City as they are playing on an OLED Switch". Nintendo Life liked the new visuals, saying that they were a "match for the artistic overhaul we saw in Streets of Rage 4". TouchArcade disliked the introduction of the game's mechanic, stating: "Newcomers are going to have to be patient as they learn the ropes, because the game frankly does a miserable job of teaching its mechanics. There's no training mode, and the CPU opponent is quite aggressive for a beginner even on easy difficulty". IGN appreciated how every move had a "logical counter" to it, with the reviewer saying: "I never felt like I was the victim of unfair tactics or an exploit of some kind".

PCMag liked how the different playstyles of each character led to interesting match-ups, giving an example of "Do you counter Brazil's super-speedster, J. Raposa, with another swift-footed character, or do you go with a powerhouse like Germany's musclebound K. Wessel?". Destructoid praised the hand-drawn 2D art, but criticized the control scheme, writing" "My issue with playing Windjammers 2 was that the throw button is also the dash button, and you're almost always dashing to intercept the saucer. Asking me to take my finger off the dash button was a tricky proposition since I felt like my momentum was best maintained with just the throw and lob". Game Informer praised the game's controls, depth, presentation, and soundtrack, but heavily criticized the lack of substantial content beyond the main portion of the game and the lack of a good in-game tutorial. GameSpot praised the fun gameplay, increased depth, and online play while criticizing the lack of accessibility and low amount of content on offer. PC Gamer found the characters and pacing to be appealing but criticized the game's punishing difficulty. Shacknews similarly lauded the mix new and returning content, smooth gameplay, visual style, soundtrack, netcode, options, and performance, while taking issue with the arcade difficulty, lack of balancing, and lack of accessibility.
