= Stella Deus: The Gate of Eternity =

2004 video game

- North American cover art
- Developer: Atlus Additional work by: Pinegrow Designer 7 (programming)
- Publishers: JP: Atlus; NA: Atlus; EU: 505 Games
- Director: Akiyasu Yamamoto
- Producers: Yoshinao Shimada; Ryo Miyazaki
- Artist: Shigenori Soejima
- Writer: Goro Azuno
- Composers: Hitoshi Sakimoto; Masaharu Iwata
- Platform: PlayStation 2
- Release: JP: October 28, 2004; NA: April 26, 2005; PAL: March 17, 2006
- Genre: Tactical role-playing
- Mode: Single-player

Stella Deus: The Gate of Eternity is a 2004 tactical role-playing game co-developed by Atlus and Pinegrow for the PlayStation 2. It was published in Japan and North America by Atlus, and in Europe by 505 Games. The gameplay, which is similar to that of Hoshigami: Ruining Blue Earth, has the player controlling six characters through story-driven tactical missions, revolving around positioning, assigned equipment, and the special skills of individual characters. The story focuses on Spero, a young man who is caught in the middle of a growing conflict between various religious factions, which in turn are being spurred by the advance of the Miasma, a force that will destroy all life.

The game began production in 2002. The game's story was supervised by fantasy writer Ryo Mizuno, and focused on themes of religious conflict. The character designs and art direction were handled by Shigenori Soejima, who came onto the game after previously doing supporting work on the Persona series. Many parts of the artistic design revolve around realistic depictions of the world's setting, clothing and weapons. The game's music was written by Hitoshi Sakimoto and Masaharu Iwata, and its theme songs and vocals were performed by Japanese singer Reiko Ariga.

== Gameplay ==
Screenshot of combat in Stella Deus during the player's turn. Shown are the standard character HUD, character turn order, and the positions of player and enemy units on the map.

Stella Deus is a story-driven tactical role-playing game in which the player controls a group of characters both picked up during the course of the story and in side events. The world is navigated using an overworld map using point-to-point navigation, with a date system showing the length of time it takes to get to a selected location. Alongside the story missions, Towns can be visited, in which characters can customize and create new weapons and armor, sell existing equipment in exchange for money, and shop for items such as healing potions. In camps set up on a journey, characters can swap out weapons and armor, equip items such as healing potions and beneficial charms for future battles. Special items used in character leveling can also be crafted by the player. Alongside story-based missions, there is a special dungeon called the Catacomb of Trials, where characters can battle and gain experience levels, raising their general statistics. The number of available levels in the Catacomb increases as players progress through the game. Each character has a specific character class, which they keep throughout the game and continue to level up as they gain experience points (XP). Higher amounts of XP are awarded for executing special abilities. Along with swordsmen and archers, there are alchemists (mages), priests (healers), and units who fight using most things from axes to fists.

Most battles are triggered based on story events, and are completed when the stated object has been accomplished by the player, be it defeating all enemies, defeating a boss, or performing a specific task. At the end of each battle, the players gain a summary of their performance and spoils gained. The game uses the turn-based Replaceable Action Position battle system, much of which was carried over from the battle system used in Hoshigami: Ruining Blue Earth. Players navigate the field across a grid-based map, which can include obstacles such as bodies of water and high structures. Character positioning within the environment can be used to their advantage, such as an archer gaining higher accuracy when at a high point in the level. Character actions are arranged in a set order, and each character's weapon dictates their attack range. Each time a character performs an action, they gain experience points and additional Skill Points (SP) that can be used to purchase supplies or raise individual character stats. Three types of Skills can be equipped for characters: Action Skills, a special attack that player execute for a certain number of Magic Points (MP); Support Skills, which grant passive abilities such as scaling higher obstacles; and Zone Skills, which grant passive abilities to both the equipped character and those in close proximity to them.

Alongside Action Skills, two or more characters in conjunction trigger unique special moves called Team Attacks. The amount of damage done depends on how many characters took part in the action. Team attacks also increase the rewards gained at the end of battles. Characters' actions are governed by their stored Action Points (AP): a character's turn begins when their AP meter is at 100. A character's actions can continue until the meter reaches 0, meaning that they can move and attack multiple times within their turn. The amount of AP used with each action depends on the weight of the armor the character is wearing.

== Plot ==
=== Setting ===
Stella Deus takes place in a world called Solum, which is slowly being swallowed by "Miasma", a mist-like substance that destroys all life it touches. Against this creeping apocalypse, several groups have developed responses. The Aeque Church, led by High Priestess Lumena, believes that the Miasma is God's will, sent to bring the world to an end, not with a bang, but a whimper. A warlord, Dignus, has taken to ravaging the countryside with his armies, imposing the law of the jungle: he who will not fight for his life does not to deserve to live. And finally, an alchemist named Viser is using Dignus's patronage to hunt the world's Spirits (polygonal creatures whose nature is unknown), draining their life-force to fuel his alchemic inventions, which he is sure will save the world. His friend and deputy, Spero, is the game's protagonist. Spero must make his way through this muddy political situation and see if he can save Solum.

=== Characters ===
Stella Deus has a total of 21 recruitable characters. Each has their own skill sets, armament and abilities, and can be sent through a "Rank Up" process to raise stats, change class (along a linear progression) and unlock new abilities.

- Spero: the main character; dual-wields katanas. Though his world-view is not especially complex, it is he who leads the quest to open the Gate of Eternity, as each of the other characters in the party is loyal primarily to him, and is generally busy keeping everyone motivated and calming hostilities.
- Linea: the other main character; a shaman who fights with a bow and offensive magic. The game's epilogue reveals a budding romance between her and Spero.
- Avis: prince and heir-apparent to the kingdom of Fortuna. Dignus destroyed Fortuna, and Avis has sworn revenge. Wields a longsword.
- Lumena: the High Priestess of the Aeque. Though pacifistic and highly spiritual, she is an implacable foe when roused, and has an array of healing magics and a staff.
- Grey: Grey's passive abilities allow him to walk farther in one turn than most other characters, and his spear allows him to strike two enemies at the same time. Grey is flippant and prone to speaking before he thinks, often leading to bickering with Adara.
- Adara: an alchemist who lost an arm in an experiment by the wicked alchemist Malkar; her mechanical replacement from Viser, an "argyrion", doubles as her battle weapon. She is one of only two magic-users with an emphasis on attack spells. Outside of battle, Adara is kind-hearted and upbeat, but ashamed of her prosthetic arm.
- Gallant: a taciturn man, Gallant is an axe-wielder. He is later revealed to be, like Linea, a member of the Anima people, though he does not share her affinity with Spirits.
- Prier: an eleven-year-old girl and Lumena's most faithful attendant, she is sent along with the party early in the game; though she insists on Aeque doctrine at first, Spero eventually teaches her not to passively wait for a peaceful end.

=== Story ===
Spero's two best friends and companions in the hunt for Spirits are Adara, a woman who lost her arm and had it replaced by an alchemic limb, an "argyrion", and Grey, a free-wheeling jokester who rags on Adara constantly. Early in the game, they meet Linea, a member of the nearly-extinct Anima culture, and a shaman: she can talk to Spirits. She informs them that the constant death of Spirits is what is bringing on the Miasma, and that the only way to save Solum is to open the "Gate of Eternity", which will bring a fresh crop of Spirits in and push the Miasma back. Spero agrees to help her with her quest, which involves securing the aid of four elemental Summon Spirits before opening the actual Gate.

Their primary resistance comes from Lord Dignus and his lieutenants (including Viser), but allies also arrive in the form of Avis, the last heir of a kingdom Dignus destroyed, and Lumena's lover; he leads the official resistance against Dignus, along with Linea's Anima clan, and eventually brings Lumena's Meridies faction into the fold. However, the Nox faction of the Aeque becomes a major thorn in Spero's side, as its leader, Nebula, is dedicated to bringing about Solum's destruction by summoning God himself: Dies Irae, the God of Destruction. Spero must stop Nebula and Dignus both to cement the victory begun with the opening of the Gate.

== Development ==
Initial preparation for Stella Deus's development began in the second half of 2002, when the project was first proposed to the developer and publisher. After initial approval, a twelve-person team was set up to create a test version in November of that year. By December, the test build was completed and the team was given permission to begin full development. The initial proposal was then fleshed out into an entire game, including the scenario and gameplay basics. Once these had been finalized, production began in earnest. The game's Beta version was completed in early 2004. Between then and the game's release, the team worked hard to finish and debug the game. The development was handled by Atlus and external studio Pinegrow, which included staff from earlier Japanese tactical RPG Hoshigami. Some programming work was outsourced to company Designer 7. Among the staff were Atlus director Akiyasu Yamamoto, and scenario supervisor Ryo Mizuno, author of the Record of Lodoss War fantasy novel series. The story Yamamoto's earlier work as a debugger for Atlus proved useful during the final stages of development. The gameplay was described by Pinegrow staff as an improved version of the battle system used in Hoshigami. The game's story revolved around religions conflict, focusing on the Aeque faith, Dignus' attempts to undermine it, and the main cast's position between the two factions. While described as a spiritual successor to Hoshigami, Atlus said that it was not a sequel to it, instead being its own game.

The character designs were done by Shigenori Soejima, who had previously worked at Atlus with Kazuma Kaneko on Atlus' Persona series. While he had heard rumors about the project, his assignment to the project came out of the blue when the game's director asked him if there was an available illustrator for the game. Soejima managed to get the post, which was his first as a lead character designer as well as art director. One of his major problems was that he had yet to refine his own drawing style. Describing himself as initially "at a loss", much of his memory of the experience is dominated by finding his chosen style rather than specific character designs. To get the feel he needed, he used brushes as opposed to cel-shaded drawing he used in later projects. The characters' metallic clothing and contrasting colors of items was influenced by The Lord of the Rings, while some characters and the environmental textures were inspired by the films of Hayao Miyazaki. The cutscenes used cel-shaded animation, and were created by Japanese studio Kamikaze Douga. Character sprites and status images used high-resolution artwork. The game's setting was in a vast desert, so this needed to be taken into account with environment and character designs. Not only did the developers need to provide places of interest to players, but Soejima needed to create realistic clothes for characters. For instance, there was a lack of classic armor in the game as the hot desert climate would have made it impractical. There was also a concern over whether the swords in the world were made using casting or forging, which would affect their design and other aesthetic elements. While creating the atmosphere, the developers tried to stay away from standard fantasy tropes. The artwork for the game was produced by artist group Kusanagi, who had also worked on Xenogears and Final Fantasy IX.

For its release in North America, Atlus' USA branch took up localization and publishing duties. As part of its release, it was re-dubbed Stella Deus: The Gate of Eternity, and featured full English voice acting for its cast. The story's heavy religious themes raised concerns that it would be censored for the west, but Atlus stated that it would keep the game intact, as they "[sought] to give gamers the same experience that Japanese gamers would have". Its North American release was announced in December 2004. The English voice recording was done by Elastic Media Corporation. For its release in Europe, the game was published by 505 Games. After release, two mobile titles based on the game were published in Japan by Atlus and mobile company Bbmf in September 2006 and January 2007 respectively: Stella Deus: Raven Spirits, a mobile version of Stella Deus featuring a separate story, and Stella Deus: Time of Alchemy, a sequel to both Stella Deus and Raven Spirits.

=== Audio ===
The sound design was one of the areas where Yamamoto was initially unsatisfied, making multiple changes with his staff during the development run-up to the game's Beta version. The soundtrack was composed and arranged by Hitoshi Sakimoto and Masaharu Iwata. It was the first time the two had worked together since their work on Final Fantasy Tactics: Sakimoto tried his hand at more serious dramatic music, while Iwata used more symphonic material than in previous works. The game's vocals and its ending theme "Holy Spirit" were performed by Reiko Ariga, credited under her stage name "Arigarei". The lyrics were written by Yukiko Mitsui. "Holy Spirit" was the first in-game vocal theme Sakimoto has written.

== Reception ==
Reception

Aggregate scores
Aggregator	Score
GameRankings	74% (44 reviews)
Metacritic	75/100 (31 reviews)

Review scores
Publication	Score
1Up.com	C+
Famitsu	31/40
GameSpot	7.5/10
GameSpy	4/5
IGN	7.7/10
RPGamer	1.5/5
RPGFan	83%

Stella Deus: The Gate of Eternity received mostly positive reviews from critics. At Metacritic, the game received an average score of 75, based on 31 reviews.
