= Street Slam =

1994 video game

- North American arcade flyer
- Developers: Data East; Onan Games (Zeebo)
- Publisher: Data East: SNK (AES/CD) G-Mode (Zeebo)
- Producer: Iwao Horita
- Designer: Atsushi Kaneko
- Programmers: Kenichi Minegishi; Mitsutoshi Sato; Mya
- Artists: Endo Chang; Hiroki Narisawa; Sachiko Moizumi; Tony Taka
- Composer: Tatsuya Kiuchi
- Series: Dunk Dream
- Platforms: Arcade, Neo Geo AES, Neo Geo CD, Zeebo
- Release: Arcade: WW: December 8, 1994; Neo Geo AES: WW: December 9, 1994; Neo Geo CD: JP/EU: January 20, 1995; Zeebo: BRA: April 16, 2010
- Genre: Sports
- Modes: Single-player, multiplayer
- Arcade system: Neo Geo MVS

Street Slam, released in Japan as Dunk Dream (Note: Japanese: ダンクドリーム, Hepburn: Danku Dorīmu) and in Europe as Street Hoop, is a 1994 basketball video game developed and published by Data East for the Neo Geo arcade and home platforms. The game features three-on-three basketball match-ups with a variety of different teams. Street Slam is the only basketball game released on the Neo Geo.

A sequel to the game, known as Dunk Dream '95 in Japan, Hoops '96 in Europe, and simply Hoops in North America, was released in 1995. In 2010, the original game was released for the Wii on the Virtual Console, as well as part of the compilation Data East Arcade Classics. Hamster Corporation re-released the game as part of their ACA Neo Geo series for the PlayStation 4, Xbox One, Nintendo Switch and Windows.

== Gameplay ==
Screenshot taken in the pre-rotating cylinder era

In the US version of the game, the player can choose a three-player team from a selection of ten city-based teams in the United States. In the European and Japanese versions of the game, the cities are replaced with countries around the world. The selection screens, player skin colours and costumes also change between the versions.

The teams have 18 points in several characteristics (dunk, 3pts, speed, and defense), and 8pts max for each. Every team has its own strengths and weaknesses. For example, New York (USA in the JP/EU version) is good in dunks and bad in 3-pointers. On the other hand, Philadelphia (Taiwan in JP/EU version) is good in 3-pointers and bad in dunks.

== Reception ==
Contemporary reception

Aggregate score
Aggregator	Score
GameRankings	(Neo Geo) 80%

Review scores
Publication	Score
AllGame	(Neo Geo) 3/5
Famitsu	(Neo Geo) 25 / 40
Next Generation	(Neo Geo CD) 2/5
Consoles +	(Neo Geo CD) 78%
GamesMaster	(Neo Geo) 76%
Games World	(Neo Geo CD) 69 / 100
Hobby Consolas	(Neo Geo CD) 88 / 100
MAN!AC	(Neo Geo) 77%
Mega Fun	(Neo Geo) 61%
Micromanía	(Neo Geo CD) 83 / 100
Play Time	(Neo Geo) 60%
Superjuegos	(Neo Geo CD) 90 / 100
Ultimate Future Games	(Neo Geo CD) 45%
Video Games	(Neo Geo) 80%

In Japan, Game Machine listed Street Slam as the eighteenth most popular arcade game of February 1995. In North America, RePlay reported the game to be the third most popular arcade game at the time. According to Famitsu, the Neo Geo CD version sold over 4,873 copies in its first week of release.

Upon release, Famitsu scored the Neo Geo version of the game a 25 out of 40. Next Generation reviewed the Neo Geo version of the game, rating it two stars out of five.

=== Retrospective reviews ===
Retrospective assessments

Aggregate score
Aggregator	Score
GameRankings	(Switch) 70%

Review scores
Publication	Score
IGN	(Wii) 8.0 / 10
Nintendo Life	(Wii) 8 / 10 (Switch) 7 / 10

Street Slam has been met with equally positive reception from retrospective reviewers in recent years.
