= Windjammers (video game) =

1994 video game

- Developer: Data East
- Publisher: Data East: SNK (AES/CD)
- Producer: Takaaki Inoue
- Designer: Tomo Adachi
- Programmers: Takaaki Inoue; Wataru Iida
- Artists: Makoto Nozu; Masateru Inagaki; Masayuki Inoshita; Galactus Mina; Yoshiyuki Urushibara; Hiroshi Tamawashi; Tomoyuki Arakawa
- Composers: Seiichi Hamada; Tomoyoshi Sato
- Series: Windjammers
- Platforms: Arcade, Neo Geo AES, Neo Geo CD, PlayStation 4, PlayStation Vita, Nintendo Switch
- Release: 17 February 1994: Arcade; WW: 17 February 1994 Neo Geo AES; WW: 8 April 1994 Neo Geo CD; JP: 20 January 1995; NA: October 1996 PlayStation 4, PlayStation Vita; WW: 29 August 2017 Nintendo Switch; WW: 23 October 2018 iiRcade; WW: 26 February 2021
- Genre: Sports
- Modes: Single-player, multiplayer
- Arcade system: Neo Geo MVS

Windjammers (Note: Known as Flying Power Disc (Japanese: フライング・パワー・ディスク, Hepburn: Furaingu Pawā Disuku) in Japan.) is a sports arcade game released by Data East for the Neo Geo arcade system in 1994. The game mechanics are essentially the same as Pong or air hockey, where players continuously shoot a flying disc at the goal zone of the opponent attempting to score. The game can be played against the computer or in a 2 player versus. Dotemu ported the game to PlayStation 4 and PlayStation Vita in August 2017, Nintendo Switch in October 2018, and iiRcade in February 2021. Dotemu would later develop and publish a sequel, Windjammers 2, which was released on PlayStation 4, Xbox One, Nintendo Switch, PC and Google Stadia on January 20, 2022.

== Gameplay ==
Gameplay screenshot.

Players choose from one of six playable characters, each with their own unique speed/power ratings and special throws. Players maneuver around their respective sides of the court in any of the eight cardinal directions (allowing for almost fluid movement in any direction). They must act as the defense and offense of their side, blocking the disc from entering the goal zone, and throwing the disc back to the opponent's side in an attempt to score. Players throw the disc back and forth (with the speed of the disc generally increasing with each throw) until one of them scores a point, which causes the disc to be reset by the referee, who throws it to the player who was scored on so that they can serve. There are yellow goal zones, worth three points when hit by the disc, and red goal zones, worth five points. In addition, failing to catch the disc while it is in the air (described below) is considered a "Miss" and gives two points to the opponent. Each of the six court types varies in the size and positioning of the goal zones.

While the opponent holds the disc, the player acts defensively by trying to grab the disc and therefore stopping it from entering their goal zone. In order to stop the disc, the player simply needs to make contact with it, by either walking into it or diving for it with a button press (which is done at almost all times due to the high speeds of the disc). Sometimes, the disc may be launched into the air, due to the opponent, the net, barriers, or sometimes bouncing off the player's back, in which a target will appear on the court showing the landing spot of the disc, which can be caught by standing on said target.

While the player holds the disc, they act offensively by trying to throw it into the goal zone of the opponent. The player cannot move while holding the disc, and cannot hold it for more than a few seconds. The player points with the joystick in the desired direction to throw the disc and presses the primary button. The player can throw it either directly at the opponent's goal zone or attempt to bounce the disc off the walls, or barriers (if in a court that contains them).

When playing against computer opponents, the player plays one match against each character (with the next character's difficulty increasing each time) until all are defeated, thus winning the game. When playing 2-player versus, one match is played between the two players. A match consists of 3 sets that last 30 seconds by default and up to 99 seconds on the arcade version (with the timer not stopping when a point is scored, unlike most sports). A set ends when either a player reaches 12 points (in which case that player wins the set) or 30 seconds have elapsed (after which the player with the most point wins the set). If the set ends in a tie, a set win is given to both players. A match is won by winning two sets, but if players tie in both of the first two sets (giving each of them two wins), the game enters a sudden death round in which the first player to score in any way wins the match.

=== Characters ===
The game features six playable characters, each of which has different statistics and a unique special move.

Characters	Playstyle	Special Move
(Italy) Loris Biaggi	Balanced	Thunder Loop
(Spain) Jordi Costa	Balanced	Rocket Diagonal
(United Kingdom) Steve Miller (Note: Replaced by "Beeho Yoo" from South Korea in European release)	Speed	Sideburner
(Japan) Hiromi Mita	Speed	Fire Snake
(United States) Gary Scott	Power	Missile Throw
(Germany) Klaus Wessel	Power	Blitzkrieg

== Ports ==
On June 22, 2010, the game was released on the Wii Virtual Console in Japan. Following the bankruptcy of Data East, the intellectual rights for this game were acquired by Paon DP, a company which hiring some of ex-Data East employees and also having developed some of Neo Geo Pocket Color titles for SNK (such as SNK Gals' Fighters). It was delisted from the Virtual Console on December 24, 2013, making it the only delisted Neo-Geo game for the Virtual Console.

A port of the game with online multiplayer support was released by DotEmu for PlayStation 4 and PlayStation Vita on August 29, 2017, with a Nintendo Switch version on October 23, 2018.

== Reception ==
Contemporary reception

Review scores
Publication	Score
Edge	(Neo Geo) 5 / 10
Famitsu	(Neo Geo) 28 / 40
Consoles +	(Neo Geo) 75%
Games World	(Neo Geo) 72% (Neo Geo CD) 73%
Hobby Consolas	(Neo Geo CD) 89%
Joypad	(Neo Geo) 74%
MAN!AC	(Neo Geo) 75%
Megablast	(Neo Geo) 62%
Mega Fun	(Neo Geo) 82%
Micromanía	(Neo Geo CD) 80%
Neo Geo Freak	(Arcade) 10 / 20
Play Time	(Neo Geo) 83%
Player One	(Neo Geo) 79%
Superjuegos	(Neo Geo) 87%
Ultimate Future Games	(Neo Geo CD) 73%
Video Games	(Neo Geo) 71%

In North America, the April 1994 issue of RePlay reported Windjammers to be the fourteenth most-popular arcade game at the time. The July 1994 issue of Play Meter later listed it as the nineteenth most-popular arcade game at the time.

In Japan, Game Machine listed Windjammers on their May 1, 1994 issue as being the twenty-second most-successful table arcade unit of the month, outperforming titles such as Samurai Shodown. According to Famitsu, the Neo Geo CD version sold over 4,307 copies in its first week on the market.

=== Retrospective reviews ===
Retrospective assessments

Aggregate score
Aggregator	Score
GameRankings	(Switch) 81.78% (PS4) 78.94%

Review scores
Publication	Score
AllGame	(Arcade) 4/5 (Neo Geo) 4/5
Jeuxvideo.com	(Neo Geo) 17 / 20 (PS4/PSV) 14 / 20
Nintendo Life	(Switch) 8/10
MAN!AC	(PS4) 75%
Video Chums	(PS4) 7 / 10

Video game website Giant Bomb began regularly playing the game on camera in 2013, eventually giving it their "Old Game of the Year" award. The same website later classified the game as a runner-up for "2017's Old Game of the Year" at the Game of the Year 2017 Awards.

In 2014, HobbyConsolas identified Windjammers as one of the twenty best games for the Neo Geo AES.

The game has also enjoyed a resurgence in popularity thanks to a growing competitive scene. In 2018, it appeared at the Evolution Championship Series (EVO) annual fighting game championships in Las Vegas as a side tournament.
