= Magical Drop =

- Arcade title screen of Magical Drop, the first game in the series
- Genre: Puzzle
- Developers: Data East; Conspiracy Entertainment (GBC); Forever Entertainment
- Publishers: Data East; SNK (Neo Geo, Neo Geo CD, Pocket Color); Classified Games (GBC)
- First release: Magical Drop; 1995
- Latest release: Magical Drop VI; 2023

Magical Drop (マジカルドロップ, Majikaru Doroppu), sometimes referred to in Japanese as MagiDro (マジドロ, MajiDoro), is a series of puzzle video games first released in the arcade, and later primarily for several platforms such as the Neo Geo Arcade, Super Famicom, Sega Saturn, PlayStation, Bandai WonderSwan, GBC and Neo Geo Pocket Color, most of which were published by Data East.

== Gameplay ==
A stack of random colored bubbles descend from the top, and a player is defeated when a bubble hits the bottom. Bubbles can be picked up and dropped by the player's clown at the bottom, and are destroyed when three or more of the same color are put together on a single column. Chains are formed either when a single drop caused a chain reaction, or when more than one group of bubbles is destroyed in quick succession. The game is normally played with two players (one may be a computer opponent), and chains cause the opponent's stack to descend faster.

There are 24 characters, all but the Black Pierrot being named after a tarot card (although the Strength card has been represented by two characters throughout the series). Different characters have different attack patterns. The columns of the opponent's stack will descend at different rates relative to each other depending on the character chosen. This causes a disjunction of colors that may make it more difficult for the other player to clear their stack. For example, with the character Devil, all the columns will descend at the same rate, whereas with Sun, the middle columns will descend faster than the others.

== History ==
Magical Drop is based on a game called Drop-Drop created by Russ Ltd, a Russian company.

In 1995, Data East released the first game in the series as a coin-operated version of this game titled Magical Drop (known in North America as Chain Reaction). Despite the arcade game being released worldwide while using the English title in North America and Europe, Data East gave the official English names of its successors the same names as their Japanese counterparts, while the home versions of the first game were never released outside Japan. The series became better known for its Neo Geo sequels, Magical Drop II and Magical Drop III, due to the popularity of the Neo Geo platform. The last games in the series released in the United States were Magical Drop Pocket for the Neo Geo Pocket Color in 1999 and Magical Drop for the Game Boy Color in 2000.

G-mode bought and currently now owns the intellectual rights to the Magical Drop franchise along with several other of Data East's franchises and titles. While Data East declared bankruptcy in 2003, other publishers have re-released the PlayStation titles Magical Drop 3 + Wonderful and Magical Drop F. Magical Drop II and Magical Drop III are also available on the subscription service GameTap. In 2007, the Super Famicom version of the first Magical Drop title was released in Japan on the Virtual Console for the Wii by G-mode. In 2009, versions of Magical Drop for Android phones and iPhone were released in May and September, respectively.

Magical Drop II was released on the Virtual Console by G-mode in May 25, 2010. The same year, Magical Drop III was included as part of Data East Arcade Classics and released on the Virtual Console in Japan on July 6. UTV Ignition Entertainment published a new sequel, Magical Drop V. Handled by the French developer Golgoth Studio, the game was released for PC on November 15, 2012. Another sequel by Forever Entertainment was released on Nintendo Switch in winter 2022.

== Characters ==
=== Introduced in Magical Drop ===
- Fool: A little man wearing a purple robe. He is always seen carrying a cat with him, which happens to share the same mannerisms as him. In the sequel, it is revealed in his ending that there are, in fact, two Fools, and they are brothers.
- Magician: A young man with a narcissistic streak. While seeming mature, he has an absurd sense of humor.
- High Priestess: A scholarly young lady who spends most of her time reading books.
- Chariot: A hot-blooded knight who has no fear and never backs down from danger.
- Devil: A mischievous young boy with demonic traits such as horns and dragon wings.
- Star: A girl who carries two jugs of water. While cheerful, she can also turn into a crybaby.
- World: A goddess-like woman with three eyes and a ribbon covering parts of her body. She debuted in the original game as the final opponent and was not playable until the sequel.

=== Introduced in Magical Drop II ===
- Justice: A teenage girl with a strong sense of justice, true to her namesake.
- Strength: A muscular man who wears iron knuckles. He is sometimes referred to as Father Strength.
- Empress: A villainous woman who wears a dominatrix outfit, though she was originally a kind and gentle woman. She debuted in the game as the final opponent.
- Black Pierrot: An evil jester-like demon who acts as the game's secret boss. He was responsible for the corruption of Empress.

=== Introduced in Magical Drop III ===
- Emperor
- Hierophant
- Lovers
- Young Strength
- Death
- Temperance
- Sun
- Judgement
- Hermit
- Moon
- Hanged Man
- Tower
- Wheel of Fortune

== Games ==
=== Magical Drop Touch ===
The fifth game was developed by Data East staff and published by G-mode and released on October 20, 2009 for the iOS and Android platform. The game was specifically designed to make use of touch screen and respond to screen tilting and incorporates only six characters from the first two games. The game was discontinued in March 2012.

== Reception ==
In Japan, Game Machine listed Magical Drop on their September 1, 1995 issue as being the tenth most-successful arcade game of the month. A review of the arcade version of the original game in Next Generation stated: "Chain Reaction is proving quite popular in Japan, despite the fact that this kind of game has been around now for at least five years". The reviewer scored the game two out of five stars, concluding that "it's not brilliant nor innovative, certainly not new, but it's fun and as addictive as sex after lunch... in a jester suit". Mean Machines gave the Saturn version an 84 out of 100, with the reviewers remarking that the game is addictive and offers numerous options, but is frustratingly difficult in single-player mode. They disagreed as to whether it is better or worse than its competitor Baku Baku Animal.

In Japan, Game Machine listed Magical Drop II on their May 1, 1996 issue as being the fifth most-successful arcade game of the month. Next Generation gave the Neo Geo AES version of Magical Drop II three out of five stars, saying that it becomes monotonous after a while, but is overall solid and reasonably addictive. He found the game's most distinctive quality was its accelerated pace, remarking that "you don't have to be as precise as [in] some puzzle games, but there is no time to think, just time to do". Reviewing the Nintendo Switch release, Nintendo Life called it "a true classic, and a must-play for puzzle game fans". Similarly to Next Generation, the reviewer said that the game is defined by how it rewards fast reflexes rather than strategy, particularly noting that there is no need to plan out combos as in most games of its type, a variation which he found "nothing short of exhilarating". Additionally praising the colorful atmosphere and presentation, catchy music, engaging multiplayer, and ideal use of the Joy-Con controller, he gave it 8 out of 10 stars.

In Japan, Game Machine listed Magical Drop III on their April 1, 1997 issue as being the third most-successful arcade game of the month.

Engadget and Destructoid gave Magical Drop V mixed-to-negative reviews, citing numerous glitches, lack of series-staple features and mechanics, and an incredibly poor translation.
